= Stevie Nicks discography =

Cataloging of published recordings by Stevie Nicks

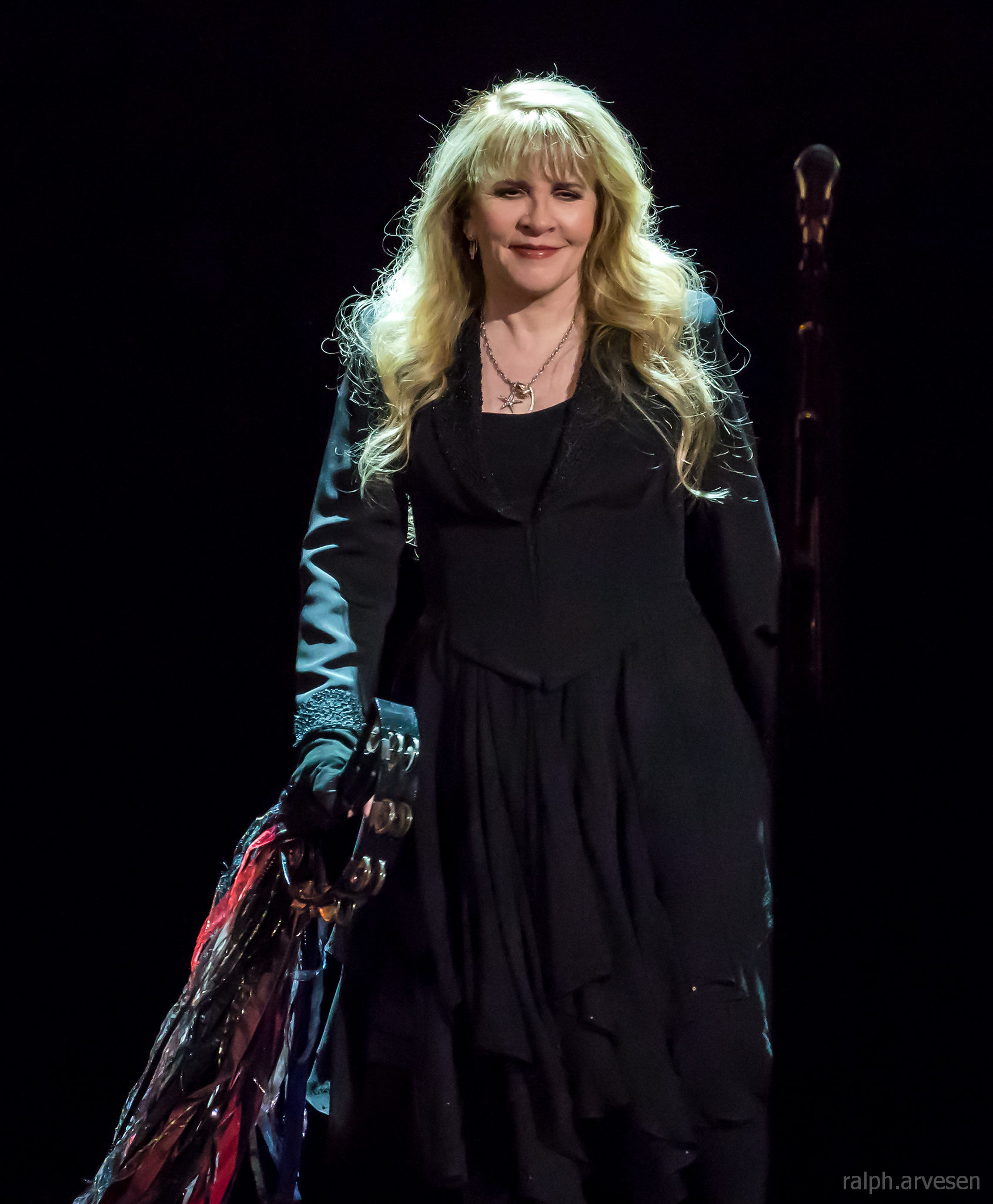
- Nicks performing in 2017
- Studio albums: 8
- Extended plays: 1
- Live albums: 3
- Compilation albums: 4
- Singles: 38
- Video albums: 7
- Music videos: 26
- Guest appearances: 26
- Box Sets: 3

This is the solo discography of the American singer-songwriter Stevie Nicks.

Although Nicks had released an album in 1973 as part of the duo Buckingham Nicks, and been a prominent member of Fleetwood Mac since 1975, she did not begin her solo career until 1981. Her debut album, Bella Donna, reached number one on the US Billboard 200 album chart and is also her best-selling album in the US. Six of her eight studio albums reached the US top ten.

== Albums ==
=== Studio albums ===
Title	Details	Peak chart positions								Sales	Certifications (sales threshold)
Title	Details	US	US Rock	AUS	CAN	GER	NZ	SWE	UK	Sales	Certifications (sales threshold)
Bella Donna	Released: July 27, 1981; Label: Modern	1	1	1	2	—	7	14	11	AUS: 100,000	RIAA: 4× Platinum; BPI: Silver; MC: 2× Platinum; RMNZ: Gold
The Wild Heart	Released: June 10, 1983; Label: Modern	5	—	8	7	25	17	19	28		RIAA: 2× Platinum; BPI: Silver; MC: Platinum
Rock a Little	Released: November 18, 1985; Label: Modern	12	—	5	11	23	25	14	30	AUS: 100,000	RIAA: Platinum; BPI: Gold
The Other Side of the Mirror	Released: May 30, 1989; Label: Modern	10	—	8	13	14	14	8	3	AUS: 100,000	RIAA: Platinum; BPI: Gold
Street Angel	Released: May 23, 1994; Label: Modern	45	—	43	—	67	—	30	16		RIAA: Gold
Trouble in Shangri-La	Released: May 1, 2001; Label: Reprise	5	—	70	29	44	33	—	43	US: 663,000	RIAA: Gold
In Your Dreams	Released: May 3, 2011; Label: Reprise	6	3	24	22	37	35	39	14	US: 199,000	
24 Karat Gold: Songs from the Vault	Released: October 7, 2014; Label: Reprise	7	3	16	29	69	40	—	14		
"—" denotes the album did not chart.

=== Live albums ===
Title	Details	Peak chart positions		Sales
Title	Details	US	US Rock	Sales
The Soundstage Sessions	Released: March 31, 2009; Label: Reprise/WEA	47	15	US: 46,000
Live in Concert: The 24 Karat Gold Tour	Released: October 20, 2020; Label: BMG Rights Management	—	35	
Bella Donna: Live 1981	Released: April 22, 2023; Label: Rhino, Modern, Atco	126	21	

=== Compilation albums ===
Title	Details	Peak chart positions						Sales	Certifications
Title	Details	US	AUS	CAN	NZ	SWE	UK	Sales	Certifications
Timespace: The Best of Stevie Nicks	Released: September 3, 1991; Label: Modern	30	13	38	1	37	15	US: 1,543,000	RIAA: Platinum; ARIA: Platinum; BPI: Gold; RMNZ: Platinum
Enchanted (3-disc box set)	Released: April 28, 1998; Label: Atlantic	85	—	—	—	—	—	US: 172,000	RIAA: Gold
The Divine Stevie Nicks	Released: November, 2000 (Europe only); Label: EMI Plus	—	—	—	—	—	—		
Crystal Visions – The Very Best of Stevie Nicks	Released: March 27, 2007; Label: Reprise/WEA	21	44	37	—	—	—	US: 348,000	ARIA: Gold; BPI: Gold
Rarities 1981 - 1983 (EP)	Released: April 22, 2017; Label: ATCO Records	—	—	—	—	—	—		
Stand Back: 1981–2017 (single-disc and three-disc box set)	Released: March 29, 2019; Label: Atlantic	— (Note: Stand Back: 1981–2017 reached No. 51 on the Top Album Sales chart.)	—	—	—	—	—		BPI: Silver
Complete Studio Albums and Rarities (16-disc vinyl and 10-disc CD box set)	Released: July 24, 2023; Label: Rhino	— (Note: The Complete Studio Albums and Rarities reached No. 23 on the Top Album Sales chart.)	—	—	—	—	— (Note: The Complete Studio Albums and Rarities reached No. 58 on the UK Official Albums Sales Chart, and 54 on the UK Physical Albums Sales Chart.)		
"—" denotes the album did not chart or was not certified

== Singles ==
Year	Single	Peak chart positions										Certifications	Album
Year	Single	US	US Rock	US A/C	AUS	CAN	GER	IRL	NLD	NZ	UK	Certifications	Album
1981	"Stop Draggin' My Heart Around" (with Tom Petty and the Heartbreakers)	3	2	—	10	5	—	—	43	11	50	MC: Gold; RMNZ: Platinum	Bella Donna
1981	"Leather and Lace" (with Don Henley)	6	26	10	68	12	—	—	—	50	—	MC: Platinum; RMNZ: Platinum	Bella Donna
1982	"Edge of Seventeen"	11	4	—	—	11	—	—	—	—	86*	BPI: 2× Platinum; MC: 3× Platinum; RMNZ: 4× Platinum	Bella Donna
1982	"After the Glitter Fades"	32	—	36	—	—	—	—	—	—	—		Bella Donna
1983	"Stand Back"	5	2	—	20	13	32	—	29	—	—		The Wild Heart
1983	"Enchanted" [airplay]	—	12	—	—	—	—	—	—	—	—		The Wild Heart
1983	"I Will Run to You" [airplay] (with Tom Petty and the Heartbreakers)	—	35	—	—	—	—	—	—	—	—		The Wild Heart
1983	"Nothing Ever Changes" [airplay]	—	19	—	—	—	—	—	—	—	—		The Wild Heart
1983	"If Anyone Falls"	14	8	—	—	—	—	—	—	—	—		The Wild Heart
1983	"Nightbird" (with Sandy Stewart)	33	32	39	—	—	—	—	—	—	—		The Wild Heart
1984	"Violet and Blue" [airplay]	—	19	—	—	—	—	—	—	—	—		The Wild Heart
1985	"Talk to Me"	4	1	14	22	10	28	—	—	45	68		Rock a Little
1986	"I Can't Wait"	16	6	—	20	43	58	29	—	39	54		Rock a Little
1986	"Has Anyone Ever Written Anything for You?"	60	—	31	—	92	—	—	—	—	84		Rock a Little
1986	"Imperial Hotel"	—	—	—	99	—	—	—	—	—	—		Rock a Little
1989	"Rooms on Fire"	16	1	16	23	9	46	17	20	12	16	RMNZ: Platinum	The Other Side of the Mirror
1989	"Long Way to Go"	—	11	—	65	—	60	—	—	—	60		The Other Side of the Mirror
1989	"Two Kinds of Love" (with Bruce Hornsby)	—	—	—	—	—	—	—	—	—	—		The Other Side of the Mirror
1989	"Whole Lotta Trouble"	—	—	—	—	—	—	22	—	—	62		The Other Side of the Mirror
1991	"Sometimes It's a Bitch"	56	7	—	18	20	55	—	—	39	40		Timespace: The Best of Stevie Nicks
1991	"Love's a Hard Game to Play"	—	—	—	—	—	—	—	—	—	—		Timespace: The Best of Stevie Nicks
1991	"I Can't Wait" [re-issue]	—	—	—	—	—	—	—	—	—	47		Timespace: The Best of Stevie Nicks
1994	"Maybe Love Will Change Your Mind"	57	36	17	—	8	—	—	—	—	42		Street Angel
1994	"Blue Denim"	—	—	—	—	69	—	—	—	—	—		Street Angel
1998	"If You Ever Did Believe"	—	—	—	—	—	—	—	—	—	—		Practical Magic: Music from the Motion Picture
1998	"Reconsider Me"	—	—	—	—	—	—	—	—	—	—		The Enchanted Works of Stevie Nicks
2001	"Every Day" [US promo]	—	—	17	—	—	—	—	—	—	—		Trouble in Shangri-La
2001	"Planets of the Universe"	—	—	—	—	—	—	—	—	—	—		Trouble in Shangri-La
2001	"Sorcerer" [US promo]	—	—	21	—	—	—	—	—	—	—		Trouble in Shangri-La
2007	"Rock and Roll"	—	—	—	—	—	—	—	—	—	—		Crystal Visions – The Very Best of Stevie Nicks
2007	"Landslide" (with the Melbourne Symphony Orchestra)	—	—	—	—	—	—	—	—	—	—		Crystal Visions – The Very Best of Stevie Nicks
2007	"Stand Back" [re-issue]	—	—	—	—	—	—	—	—	—	—		Crystal Visions – The Very Best of Stevie Nicks
2009	"Crash Into Me"	—	—	—	—	—	—	—	—	—	—		The Soundstage Sessions
2011	"Secret Love"	—	—	20	—	—	—	—	—	—	—		In Your Dreams
2011	"For What It's Worth"	—	—	25	—	—	—	—	—	—	—		In Your Dreams
2014	"The Dealer"	—	—	—	—	—	—	—	—	—	—		24 Karat Gold: Songs from the Vault
2014	"Lady"	—	—	—	—	—	—	—	—	—	—		24 Karat Gold: Songs from the Vault
2014	"Starshine"	—	—	—	—	—	—	—	—	—	—		24 Karat Gold: Songs from the Vault
2014	"24 Karat Gold"	—	—	—	—	—	—	—	—	—	—		24 Karat Gold: Songs from the Vault
2020	"Show Them the Way"	—	—	—	—	—	—	—	—	—	—		Non-album single
2022	"For What It's Worth" (Buffalo Springfield cover)	—	—	—	—	—	—	—	—	—	—		Complete Studio Albums & Rarities
2024	"The Lighthouse"	—	—	—	—	—	—	—	—	—	—		Non-album single
"—" denotes the single failed to chart or wasn't released

* "Edge of Seventeen" never charted when originally released in the UK in 1982, but charted from downloads in the UK in 2021.

=== Guest appearances ===
Year	Single	US	US Rock	US A/C	AUS	CAN	GER	ITA	UK	Certifications	Album
1977	"Only the Lucky" (with Walter Egan)	82	—	—	—	—	—	—	—		Fundamental Roll
1978	"Whenever I Call You "Friend"" (with Kenny Loggins)	5	—	9	26	3	—	—	—		Nightwatch
1979	"Midnight Wind" (with John Stewart)	28	—	—	97	20	—	—	—		Bombs Away Dream Babies
1979	"Lost Her in the Sun" (with John Stewart)	34	—	—	—	—	—	—	—		Bombs Away Dream Babies
1983	"Smiling Islands" (with Robbie Patton)	52	—	16	—	—	—	—	—		Orders From Headquarters
1985	"Needles and Pins" (with Tom Petty and the Heartbreakers)	37	17	—	—	85	—	—	—		Pack Up the Plantation: Live!
1992	"Desireé" (with Rick Vito)	—	32	—	—	—	—	—	—		King of Hearts
1993	"Secret" (with Robin Zander)	—	—	—	—	—	—	—	—		Robin Zander
1996	"Twisted" (with Lindsey Buckingham)	—	—	—	—	43	—	—	—		Twister: Music from the Motion Picture Soundtrack
2002	"C'mon, C'mon" (with Sheryl Crow)	—	36	—	—	—	—	—	—		C'mon, C'mon
2002	"You're Not The One" (with Sheryl Crow)	—	—	—	—	—	—	—	—		C'mon, C'mon
2004	"Santa Claus Is Coming to Town" (with Chris Isaak)	—	—	25	—	—	—	—	—		Christmas
2006	"Dreams" (with Deep Dish)	—	—	—	27	—	—	39	14		George Is On
2013	"You Can't Fix This" (with Foo Fighters)	—	—	—	—	47	—	—	—		Sound City: Real to Reel
2014	"Golden" (with Lady Antebellum)	—	—	—	—	—	—	—	—		Golden
2015	"It Don't Matter to the Sun" (with Don Henley)	—	—	—	—	—	—	—	—		Cass County
2016	"Southern Accents" (with Charles Kelley)	—	—	—	—	—	—	—	—		The Driver
2017	"Beautiful People Beautiful Problems" (with Lana Del Rey)	—	29	—	—	—	—	—	—		Lust for Life
2018	"Borrowed" (with LeAnn Rimes)	—	—	—	—	—	—	—	—		Stand Back 1981-2017
2019	"Prove You Wrong" (with Sheryl Crow and Maren Morris)	—	—	—	—	—	—	—	—		Threads
2020	"Edge of Midnight" (with Miley Cyrus)	—	—	—	—	—	—	—	—	RMNZ: Gold	Plastic Hearts
2021	"Remedy" (with Maroon 5)	—	—	—	—	—	—	—	—		Jordi
2021	"Stolen Car" (with Elton John)	—	—	—	—	—	—	—	—		The Lockdown Sessions
2023	"Oil" (with Gorillaz)	—	—	—	—	—	—	—	—		Cracker Island
2023	"What Has Rock and Roll Ever Done for You" (with Dolly Parton & Waddy Wachtel)	—	—	—	—	—	—	—	—		Rockstar
2024	"Maybe This Christmas" (with Jason Kelce)	—	—	—	—	—	—	—	—		A Philly Special Christmas Party
	"—" denotes the single failed to chart or wasn't released										

== Soundtrack and compilation appearances ==
Year	Song	Album	Additional information
1981	"Blue Lamp"	Heavy Metal	Recorded during the Bella Donna sessions.
1982	"Sleeping Angel"	Fast Times at Ridgemont High	
1984	"Violet and Blue"	Against All Odds	
1986	"Battle of the Dragon"	American Anthem	
1987	"Silent Night"	A Very Special Christmas	Cover of Franz Xaver Gruber & Joseph Mohr song
1995	"Somebody Stand by Me"	Boys on the Side	Written by Sheryl Crow
1996	"Twisted" (with Lindsey Buckingham)	Twister	
1996	"Free Fallin'"	Party of Five	Remake of Tom Petty song
1998	"Crystal"	Practical Magic	Remake of the Buckingham Nicks / Fleetwood Mac song
1998	"If You Ever Did Believe"	Practical Magic	
1998	"At Last"	Stormy Weather	live version Mack Gordon and Harry Warren song
2001	"Touched by an Angel"	Sweet November	
2011	"Not Fade Away"	Listen to Me: Buddy Holly	Remake of the Crickets song, written by Buddy Holly
2017	"Your Hand I Will Never Let It Go"	The Book of Henry	Written by Ryan Miller
2022	"Cotton Candy Land" (with Chris Isaak)	Elvis	Remake of Elvis Presley track written by Ruth Bachelor and Bob Roberts
2026	"Doing the Best That I Can"	The Hunger Games: Sunrise on the Reaping	

== Videography ==
=== Home video albums ===
- 1982 - White Wing Dove - Stevie Nicks in Concert (Bella Donna Tour, 1981) LD/VHS
- 1986 - I Can't Wait - The Music Video Collection (6 videos, 1981–86) LD/VHS
- 1987 - Live at Red Rocks (Rock a Little Tour, 1986) LD/VHS/DVD/DD
- 2007 - Crystal Visions – The Very Best of Stevie Nicks (Deluxe edition 13 music video collection, 1981–2001) CD+DVD
- 2008 - Soundstage: Stevie Nicks Live (Broadcast, 2007) (Sears-exclusive Blu-ray 2008, Live in Chicago DVD 2009, DD 2014)
- 2013 - Stevie Nicks: In Your Dreams (Album making-of documentary, 2012) DVD/DD
- 2017 - Live 1983 US Festival (Broadcast, 1983) Streaming
- 2020 - Live In Concert - The 24 Karat Gold Tour (Filmed 2017) 2xCD+DVD/Blu-ray/DD

=== Music promo videos ===
- 1981 - "Stop Draggin' My Heart Around" (with Tom Petty)
- 1981 - "Insider" (Tom Petty and the Heartbreakers)
- 1981 - "Leather and Lace" (live)
- 1981 - "Edge of Seventeen"
- 1982 - "Edge of Seventeen" (live)
- 1983 - "Stand Back" (Scarlett version)
- 1983 - "Stand Back" (release version)
- 1983 - "If Anyone Falls"
- 1985 - "Talk to Me"
- 1986 - "I Can't Wait"
- 1989 - "Rooms on Fire"
- 1989 - "Whole Lotta Trouble" (live)
- 1991 - "Sometimes It's A Bitch"
- 1994 - "Blue Denim"
- 1998 - "If You Ever Did Believe" (Practical Magic soundtrack)
- 2001 - "Every Day"
- 2001 - "Sorcerer" (with Sheryl Crow)
- 2006 - “Dreams” (Deep Dish Remix)
- 2011 - "Cheaper Than Free" (featuring Dave Stewart)
- 2011 - "Secret Love"
- 2011 - "For What It's Worth"
- 2011 - "Moonlight (A Vampire's Dream)"
- 2014 - "Lady"
- 2015 - "Blue Water”
- 2020 - "Show Them The Way"
- 2020 - "Show Them The Way" (Piano version)
- 2024 - "The Lighthouse"
