= Linus Loves =

Scottish dance music group

- Origin: Glasgow, Scotland
- Genres: House, electronic, synthpop
- Years active: 2003–present
- Labels: Breastfed Recordings (2003–present)
- Members: Duncan Reid
- Past members: Kevin McKay
- Website: myspace.com/linuslovesbreastfed

Linus Loves is the alias of Scottish dance music remixer/producer Duncan Reid and, until 2005, a duo consisting of himself and Kevin McKay. Reid and McKay co-founded Breastfed Recordings together in 2002 with Myles MacInnes, known as Mylo. McKay left the outfit in 2005, and Reid has continued using the moniker until the present day.

The outfit is best known for their 2003 hit single "Stand Back", with vocals by Sam Obernik. It is a cover version of the 1983 Stevie Nicks' song. The track peaked at number 31 on the UK Singles Chart in November 2003.

Reid has since become an in-demand remixer working on songs for various artists including Britney Spears, Kelis, Mika, Jamiroquai and Scissor Sisters.

== Discography ==
=== Albums ===
- Stage Invader (2006)

=== Extended plays ===
- The Victoria Principle EP (2005)

=== Singles ===
List of singles, with selected chart positions
Title	Year	Peak chart positions	
Title	Year	UK	AUS
"The Terrace"	2003	90	—
"Stand Back" (featuring Sam Obernik)	2003	31	73
"Night Music"	2004	—	—

=== Selected remixes ===
- Scissor Sisters – "I Don't Feel Like Dancin'" (2006)
- Jamelia – "Something About You" (2006)
- Justin Timberlake – "SexyBack" (2006)
- Groove Armada featuring Mutya Buena – "Song 4 Mutya (Out of Control)" (2007)
- The Killers – "Read My Mind" (2007)
- Kelis – "Lil Star" (2007)
- Mika – "Grace Kelly" (2007)
- Yoko Ono – "No, No, No" (2008)
- Alphabeat – "Fascination" (2008)
- Ladyhawke – "Dusk Till Dawn" (2008)
- Britney Spears – "Circus" (2009)
- Pixie Lott – "Mama Do (Uh Oh, Uh Oh)" (2009)
- Jamiroquai – "Blue Skies" (2010)
- Britney Spears – "Hold It Against Me" (2011)
- Theophilus London – "Wine and Chocolates" (2012)
