= Crystal Visions – The Very Best of Stevie Nicks =

Crystal Visions... The Very Best of Stevie Nicks

Greatest hits album by Stevie Nicks
- Released: March 27, 2007
- Recorded: 1976–2006
- Genre: Rock
- Length: 78:21
- Label: Reprise
- Producer: Jimmy Iovine; Tom Petty; Gordon Perry; Fleetwood Mac; Ken Caillat; Richard Dashut; Sheryl Crow; John Shanks; Rick Nowels; Rupert Hine; Deep Dish; Stevie Nicks; Waddy Wachtel

Stevie Nicks chronology
Trouble in Shangri-La (2001)	Crystal Visions... The Very Best of Stevie Nicks (2007)	The Soundstage Sessions (2009)

Professional ratings
Review scores
Source	Rating
AllMusic	4.5/5 stars
Uncut	3/5 stars

Crystal Visions... The Very Best of Stevie Nicks is a compilation album released by the American singer-songwriter and Fleetwood Mac vocalist Stevie Nicks. It features songs from her solo career, as well as her career with Fleetwood Mac. It includes her hit singles, a dance remix, and one new track, a live version of Led Zeppelin's "Rock and Roll". Three singles were culled from the album: "Rock and Roll", "Landslide", and a remixed version of "Stand Back". There are two versions of this album, one with just the audio CD and another version with an included DVD featuring all of Nicks' music videos with audio commentary from Nicks, as well as rare footage from the Bella Donna recording sessions. The album debuted and peaked at No. 21 in the United States selling 33,944 copies in its first week. The album spent a total of 12 weeks on the Billboard 200 chart, and had sold 348,000 copies as of February 2011. The album is certified gold in Australia and the United Kingdom.

The title refers to a lyric from "Dreams".

== Track listing ==
No.	Title	Writer(s)	Length
1.	"Edge of Seventeen"	Stevie Nicks	5:29
2.	"I Can't Wait"	Nicks; Rick Nowels; Eric Pressly	4:35
3.	"Sorcerer"	Nicks	4:54
4.	"If Anyone Falls"	Nicks; Sandy Stewart	4:07
5.	"Stop Draggin' My Heart Around" (with Tom Petty and the Heartbreakers)	Tom Petty; Mike Campbell	4:02
6.	"Silver Springs" (with Fleetwood Mac)	Nicks	4:45
7.	"Dreams" (Deep Dish Club Mix – Radio edit)	Nicks	3:46
8.	"Rhiannon" (Live)	Nicks	7:01
9.	"Rooms on Fire"	Nicks; Nowels	4:34
10.	"Talk to Me"	Chas Sandford	4:10
11.	"Landslide" (Live with the Melbourne Symphony Orchestra)	Nicks	4:14
12.	"Stand Back"	Nicks	4:48
13.	"Planets of the Universe"	Nicks	4:45
14.	"Rock and Roll" (Live)	Jimmy Page; Robert Plant; John Paul Jones; John Bonham	4:03
15.	"Leather and Lace" (with Don Henley)	Nicks	3:54
16.	"Edge of Seventeen" (Live with the Melbourne Symphony Orchestra)	Nicks	9:14
Total length:			78:21

Deluxe edition DVD
No.	Title	Writer(s)	Length
1.	"Stop Draggin' My Heart Around" (Duet with Tom Petty)		4:05
2.	"Edge of Seventeen" (Live)		8:27
3.	"Stand Back" (Scarlett version)		4:18
4.	"Stand Back"		4:48
5.	"If Anyone Falls"		4:07
6.	"Talk to Me"		4:10
7.	"I Can't Wait"		4:15
8.	"Rooms on Fire"		4:34
9.	"Whole Lotta Trouble" (Live)	Nicks; Campbell	4:33
10.	"Sometimes It's a Bitch"	Jon Bon Jovi; Billy Falcon	4:39
11.	"Blue Denim"	Nicks; Campbell	4:13
12.	"Every Day"	John Shanks; Damon Johnson	3:40
13.	"Sorcerer"		4:50
Total length:			60:15

Deluxe iTunes edition
No.	Title	Length
17.	"Stand Back" (Live)	5:45
18.	"Stand Back (Scarlett version)" (Music video with commentary)	4:18
19.	"Edge of Seventeen (Live)" (Music video with commentary)	8:27
Total length:		96:45

== Charts ==
Chart	Peak
Australian Albums Chart	44
Canadian Albums Chart	37
US Billboard 200	21

== Certifications ==
Region	Certification	Certified units/sales
Australia (ARIA)	Gold	35,000^{^}
United Kingdom (BPI)	Gold	100,000^{‡}
^{^} Shipments figures based on certification alone.^{‡} Sales+streaming figures based on certification alone.
