= Timespace: The Best of Stevie Nicks =

Greatest hits album by Stevie Nicks
- Released: September 3, 1991
- Recorded: 1980–1991
- Genre: Rock
- Length: 63:58
- Labels: Modern (US); Atlantic (Canada); EMI (UK)
- Producers: Danny Kortchmar; Jon Bon Jovi; Jimmy Iovine; Tom Petty; Chris Lord-Alge; Rupert Hine; Chas Sandford; Bret Michaels; Rick Nowels; Mike Campbell; Stevie Nicks

Stevie Nicks chronology
| The Other Side of the Mirror (1989) | Timespace: The Best of Stevie Nicks (1991) | Street Angel (1994) |

Singles from Timespace: The Best of Stevie Nicks
- 1. "Sometimes It's a Bitch" Released: August 12, 1991; 2. "Love’s a Hard Game to Play" Released: September 1991; 3. "I Can't Wait (reissue)" Released: October 1991

Timespace: The Best of Stevie Nicks is the first greatest hits album by American singer-songwriter Stevie Nicks. It was released on September 3, 1991, via Modern and Atlantic Records in the U.S. and EMI internationally. The album features many of her hit singles from her solo career. Included in the track list are three new songs: "Sometimes It's a Bitch"–co-written by Jon Bon Jovi, "Love's a Hard Game to Play"–co-written by Bret Michaels, and "Desert Angel", which Nicks wrote for the soldiers serving in the Gulf War. The album's booklet contains notes written by Nicks herself about each song.

The album debuted and peaked at number 30 on the US Billboard 200, Nicks' lowest charting album at the time, but it remained on the chart for nearly six months and, as of February 2011, the album had sold over 1.5 million copies in the United States. The album was certified Platinum by the Recording Industry Association of America (RIAA) in 1997. The album also achieved a Gold certification by the British Phonographic Industry (BPI) for shipping 100,000 copies in the United Kingdom and was Nicks' third top 20 album there. The album spent four weeks at number one in New Zealand.

The Fleetwood Mac song "Silver Springs" (written by Nicks) was originally intended to be in the compilation, but Mick Fleetwood, the band's drummer and leader, would not allow Nicks to release the song because of his plans to release it on a forthcoming Fleetwood Mac box set. This led to a dispute, resulting in Nicks leaving Fleetwood Mac for several years.

== Content ==
Timespace features ten of Nicks' previous singles from her solo career, along with the album cut "Beauty and the Beast" from The Wild Heart (1983). Most of the previously released singles included have been remixed by Chris Lord-Alge for the album.

Three new singles were recorded for Timespace specifically. The opening track to the album, "Sometimes It's a Bitch", was written by Jon Bon Jovi and Billy Falcon. Nicks initially did not want to record the track due to the inclusion of the word 'bitch' but had a change of heart once she realized that "he dreamed about what the notorious Stevie Nicks had been like...and what it had all done to her...the indulgences, the lifestyle." "Love's a Hard Game to Play", the second newly recorded track, was written by Bret Michaels of Poison and Pat Schunk. She described how Michaels had brought back her "laughter" that she thought she had lost, and how she hoped he would stay her "friend for a long time". The third and final newly recorded song, "Desert Angel", was only included on CD editions of Timespace and was written by Nicks and Mike Campbell. She reflected on how she wanted to write a letter to the soldiers serving in the Gulf War and how "we had lived through it, we had prayed, and my song would make at least all of us...never forget this war."

== Critical reception ==
Professional ratings
Review scores
| Source | Rating |
|---|---|
| AllMusic | 4.5/5 stars |
| Christgau's Consumer Guide | (1-star Honorable Mention) |
| The Encyclopedia of Popular Music | 3/5 stars |
| The New Rolling Stone Album Guide | 4/5 stars |

Timespace received a positive reception from music critics, praising the previous material and defining it as a "splendid representation" of her solo career. The new tracks, meanwhile, received mixed reviews. Chuck Campbell of Denver Rocky Mountain News compared the three new songs as "comparatively awful against these illustrious hits."

== Personnel for new tracks ==
Taken from the Timespace: The Best of Stevie Nicks booklet.

"Sometimes It's a Bitch"

- Benmont Tench – organ
- Robbie Buchanan – synthesizer programming
- Waddy Wachtel – electric guitar
- Danny Kortchmar – electric guitar
- Tico Torres – drums
- Randy Jackson – bass
- Jon Bon Jovi – acoustic guitar
- Sharon Celani – background vocals
- Lori Perry Nicks – background vocals

"Love's a Hard Game to Play"

- Pat Schunk – acoustic and electric guitar, bass, keyboards
- Denny Fongheiser – drums
- Bret Michaels – 12 string guitar, additional vocals
- Sharon Celani – background vocals
- Lori Perry Nicks – background vocals
- Roger Love – background vocals
- Dave Harte – tambourine

"Desert Angel"

- Michael Campbell – guitar, bass, keyboards
- Benmont Tench – organ, piano
- Sharon Celani – background vocals
- Lori Perry Nicks – background vocals

== Track listing ==
Timespace: The Best of Stevie Nicks track listing
| No. | Title | Writer(s) | Original Album | Length |
|---|---|---|---|---|
| 1. | "Sometimes It's a Bitch" | Jon Bon Jovi; Billy Falcon | Previously unreleased | 4:38 |
| 2. | "Stop Draggin' My Heart Around" (Duet with Tom Petty and the Heartbreakers, Chris Lord-Alge Remix) | Tom Petty; Mike Campbell | Bella Donna | 4:04 |
| 3. | "Whole Lotta Trouble" (Tom Lord-Alge Remix) | Nicks; Campbell | The Other Side of the Mirror | 4:31 |
| 4. | "Talk to Me" | Chas Sandford | Rock a Little | 4:12 |
| 5. | "Stand Back" (Chris Lord-Alge Remix) | Nicks | The Wild Heart | 4:57 |
| 6. | "Beauty and the Beast" | Nicks | The Wild Heart | 6:04 |
| 7. | "If Anyone Falls" (Chris Lord-Alge Remix) | Nicks; Sandy Stewart | The Wild Heart | 4:08 |
| 8. | "Rooms on Fire" (Chris Lord-Alge Remix) | Nicks; Rick Nowels | The Other Side of the Mirror | 4:40 |
| 9. | "Love's a Hard Game to Play" | Bret Michaels; Pat Schunk | Previously unreleased | 5:03 |
| 10. | "Edge of Seventeen" (Chris Lord-Alge Remix) | Nicks | Bella Donna | 5:27 |
| 11. | "Leather and Lace" (Duet with Don Henley, Chris Lord-Alge Remix) | Nicks | Bella Donna | 3:49 |
| 12. | "I Can't Wait" | Nicks; Nowels; Eric Pressly | Rock a Little | 4:37 |
| 13. | "Has Anyone Ever Written Anything for You?" (Chris Lord-Alge Remix) | Nicks | Rock a Little | 4:39 |
| 14. | "Desert Angel" (CD bonus track – not on vinyl and cassette) | Nicks; Campbell | Previously unreleased | 5:21 |
| Total length: | | | | 63:58 |

== Charts ==
=== Weekly charts ===
Weekly chart performance for Timespace: The Best of Stevie Nicks
| Chart (1991) | Peak position |
|---|---|
| Australian Albums (ARIA) | 13 |
| Canada Top Albums/CDs (RPM) | 25 |
| Dutch Albums (Album Top 100) | 61 |
| European Albums (Music & Media) | 25 |
| German Albums (Offizielle Top 100) | 29 |
| Irish Albums (IFPI) | 6 |
| New Zealand Albums (RMNZ) | 1 |
| Swedish Albums (Sverigetopplistan) | 37 |
| UK Albums (Official Charts) | 15 |
| US Billboard 200 | 30 |

=== Year-end charts ===
Year-end chart performance for Timespace: The Best of Stevie Nicks
| Chart (1991) | Position |
|---|---|
| New Zealand Albums (RMNZ) | 13 |

== Certifications ==
| Region | Certification | Certified units/sales |
|---|---|---|
| Australia (ARIA) | Platinum | 70,000^{^} |
| New Zealand (RMNZ) | Platinum | 15,000^{^} |
| United Kingdom (BPI) | Gold | 100,000^{^} |
| United States (RIAA) | Platinum | 1,000,000^{^} |
^{^} Shipments figures based on certification alone.
