= Beauty and the Beast (Stevie Nicks song) =

Song by Stevie Nicks

from the album The Wild Heart
- A-side: "Whole Lotta Trouble (released in 1989)"
- Released: 1983
- Recorded: 1983
- Genre: Soft rock
- Length: 6:02
- Label: Modern
- Songwriter(s): Stevie Nicks
- Producer(s): Jimmy Iovine

"Beauty and the Beast" is a song by the American singer-songwriter Stevie Nicks. It is the final track on her second album The Wild Heart, released in 1983. It was later released in a live version from Nicks 1986 Rock a Little tour as a B-side to the UK single "Whole Lotta Trouble" in October 1989. It also appears on two compilations: Timespace – The Best of Stevie Nicks, released in 1991, and the boxset, Enchanted, released in 1998. A new studio version appears on her album, The Soundstage Sessions, released in 2009.

== Inspiration and interpretations ==
The song receives its titles and initial inspiration from French filmmaker Jean Cocteau's 1946 film Beauty and the Beast, one of Stevie Nicks' favorite classic films. Nicks explains the importance of the song to her, both during live performances and in various interviews, as one that encompasses her whole life and represents how everyone is either a beauty or a beast, usually both On its re-release in Timespace – The Best of Stevie Nicks (1991), she dedicates the song to Vincent and Catherine, of the late 80's television show, "Beauty and the Beast."

== Studio session ==
"Beauty and the Beast" was recorded during a single three-hour session in Gordon Perry's recording studio. It is recorded with a full string orchestra and grand piano. During the recording session, Stevie Nicks and her back-up vocalists wore long black gowns and served champagne to the visiting musicians.

== Personnel (1983 studio version) ==
Main performers

- Stevie Nicks – vocals
- Roy Bittan – piano
- Sharon Celani – backup vocals
- Lori Perry – backup vocals

String section

- Paul Buckmaster – arranger & conductor
- Bianco – harp
- Jesse Levine – viola
- Julien Barber – viola
- Theodore Israel – viola
- Harry Zaratzian – viola
- Jesse Levy – cello
- Frederick Zlotkin – cello
- Seymour Barab – cello
- Jon Abramowitz – cello
- Marvin Morgenstern – violin
- Herbert Sorkin – violin
- John Pintavalle – violin
- Max Ellen – violin
- Regis Eandiorio – violin
- Harry Glickman – violin
- Peter Dimitriades – violin
- Paul Winter – violin
- Matthew Raimondi – violin
- Harry Cykman – violin
- Raymond Kunicki – violin
- Lewis Eley – violin
- Ruth Waterman – violin
- Paul Gershman – violin

== Personnel (2009 studio version) ==
Main performers

- Stevie Nicks – vocals, producer
- Sharon Celani – backup vocals
- Lori Nicks – backup vocals
- Jana Anderson – backup vocals

String section

- Eric Roth – conductor
- Janice MacDonald – flute
- Deb Stevenson – oboe
- Greg Flint – horn
- Christine Worthing – horn
- Guillaume Combet – violin
- Jennifer Cappelli – violin
- Carmen Llop-Kassinger – violin
- Christine Keiko Abe – violin
- Carol Cook – viola
- Jocelyn Davis-Beck – cello
- Eddie Bayers – drums
- Michael Rhodes – bass
- Joe Thomas – keyboards

== Live performance ==
During her 2006 and 2007 tours, Stevie Nicks performed "Beauty and the Beast" as her encore. For this number, she changed into a black dress and styled her hair into an up-do to resemble Belle from the 1946 film. Footage from the film played in the background as well while she performed. Due to issues obtain copyrights for the 1946 film, a performance of the song was cut from the final edit of her 2009 Live in Chicago DVD. Instead, a new studio version recorded in Nashville in January 2008 appears on the accompanying album, The Soundstage Sessions.
