= Landslide (Fleetwood Mac song) =

1975 song by Fleetwood Mac

Song by Fleetwood Mac

from the album Fleetwood Mac
- Released: July 1975
- Recorded: 1975
- Genre: Folk rock
- Length: 3:19
- Label: Reprise
- Songwriter: Stevie Nicks
- Producers: Fleetwood Mac; Keith Olsen

Audio sample
- file; help

"Landslide" is a song by the British-American rock band Fleetwood Mac, written by Stevie Nicks, first featured on the band's 1975 album Fleetwood Mac. A live version from the reunion album The Dance was released as a single in 1998, climbing to No. 51 on the US Billboard Hot 100 chart and No. 10 on the Adult Contemporary chart in 1998.

The original studio recording appears on the compilation albums 25 Years – The Chain (1992), The Very Best of Fleetwood Mac (2002), and 50 Years – Don't Stop (2018). "Landslide" was certified Gold in October 2009 for sales of over 500,000 copies in the United States. According to Nielsen Soundscan, "Landslide" sold 2,093,186 copies in the United States as of 2017.

Rolling Stone ranked the song 163rd among their 500 Greatest Songs of All Time in 2021. The original studio version debuted at No. 41 on the US Billboard Hot 100 in January 2026 following its inclusion on the series finale of the Netflix series Stranger Things.

== Composition and recording ==
Stevie Nicks has said that she wrote "Landslide" while contemplating either going back to school or continuing on professionally with guitarist Lindsey Buckingham. At the time, Nicks was financially supporting both herself and Buckingham by taking up jobs as both a waitress and a cleaning lady. Following the release of their debut album Buckingham Nicks, they had been dropped from their recording contract by Polydor Records before they could release a follow-up. Nicks wrote the song while visiting Aspen, Colorado, sitting in someone's living room "looking out at the Rocky Mountains pondering the avalanche of everything that had come crashing down on us ... at that moment, my life truly felt like a landslide in many ways."

On the studio recording of "Landslide", Buckingham played a Martin D-18 acoustic guitar using a Travis picking technique with the thumb alternating between bass notes. He described the part as a "three against four pattern that crosses the bar line and gives the chorus another level of lift." In 2007, Buckingham told The Austin Chronicle that the song addressed some of the interpersonal issues between him and Nicks. He thought that the song possessed a "nice" guitar solo and also maintained that "Landslide" was not a "signature guitar piece". In a different interview, Buckingham discussed how he bristled at the notion that "Landslide" was associated with country music.

'Landslide' is a great song, but I don't want anyone to get the funny idea about Fleetwood Mac and country. Somebody at our label was talking about how we should broaden our audience, and they started talking about putting us on Country Music Television. I had to say, 'Whoa! Stop right there.' There's a certain kind of profile you want to put out there. And that isn't it.

— Lindsey Buckingham

== Live performances and release ==
"Landslide" (live)

Single by Fleetwood Mac

from the album The Dance
- Released: January 1998
- Recorded: 23 May 1997
- Length: 4:27
- Label: Reprise
- Songwriter: Stevie Nicks
- Producers: Lindsey Buckingham; Elliot Scheiner

Fleetwood Mac singles chronology
"Silver Springs" (live) (1997)	"Landslide" (live) (1998)	"Peacekeeper" (2003)

"Landslide" is one of Fleetwood Mac's most frequently performed during tours. Nicks has sung it on every Fleetwood Mac tour since joining the band, with the exception of the Shake the Cage Tour, and has performed it on all of her own solo tours from 2005's Two Voices Tour onwards. A live performance of "Landslide" recorded on 27 June 1980 at the London Wembley Arena was included on Live. For early live performances of "Landslide", Buckingham played the song on an Ovation guitar with a built-in pickup. Other live recordings of "Landslide" also appear on Live in Boston (2004), Crystal Visions – The Very Best of Stevie Nicks (2007) (with the Melbourne Symphony Orchestra), The Soundstage Sessions (2009), Soundstage (2004) and the Live in Chicago DVD (2009).

"Landslide" was never issued as a single until the band released a live version from Fleetwood Mac's 1997 album The Dance. Radio & Records reported that this version of "Landslide" was serviced to hot adult contemporary radio stations in its 16 January 1998 publication. "Landslide" debuted at number 59 on the US Billboard Hot 100 for the week dated 18 July 1998, becoming the band's second entry on the chart during the 1990s after "Save Me", which was released eight years prior. "Landslide" eventually peaked at number 51; it became their last single to chart on the Billboard Hot 100 until 2003, when "Peacekeeper" debuted at number 93. "Landslide" also reached the top 30 on both the US and Canadian adult contemporary charts.

Following the song's inclusion on the season finale of "Stranger Things", an American television series that aired on Netflix, the studio version of "Landslide" entered the charts in several countries. It received 7 million streams, 800,000 radio impressions, and 1,000 downloads in the United States from 2–8 January 2026, which was sufficient for a debut of No. 41 on the Billboard Hot 100, making it the first time the band appeared on the chart since 2020 when "Dreams" re-entered the listing after being featured in a TikTok video. In the United Kingdom, "Landslide" debuted at No. 20 on the Official Singles Chart, making it the band's first new entry on the chart since 2009, when "The Chain" entered at No. 94.

Nicks performed "Landslide" at the Metropolitan Museum of Art in a duet with Sabrina Carpenter for the Met Gala on 4 May 2026.

== Reception ==
In a contemporary review, Rolling Stone wrote that Nicks seemed "lost and out of place" on "Landslide" and that her voice sounded "callow and mannered".

In his review of the Fleetwood Mac album, Ben Edmonds of Phonograph Record said that "Landslide" demonstrated Nicks' versatility as a songwriter.

Retrospective reviews have been more positive, with publications such as The Guardian and Paste ranking "Landslide" among the band's best work. AllMusic described "Landslide" as a traditional song "built on a very simple (and very effective) country-folk-inspired chord progression".

== Personnel ==
- Stevie Nicks – vocals
- Lindsey Buckingham – guitars

== Charts ==
=== Weekly charts ===
1998 weekly chart performance for "Landslide"
Chart (1998)	Peak position
Canada Adult Contemporary (RPM)	21
US Billboard Hot 100	51
US Adult Contemporary (Billboard)	10
US Adult Pop Airplay (Billboard)	26

2020 weekly chart performance for "Landslide"
Chart (2020)	Peak position
Australia (ARIA)	115
US Hot Rock & Alternative Songs (Billboard)	13

2021 weekly chart performance for "Landslide"
Chart (2021)	Peak position
US Rock Digital Songs (Billboard)	5

2025–2026 weekly chart performance for "Landslide"
Chart (2025–2026)	Peak position
Australia On Replay Singles (ARIA)	16
Canada Hot 100 (Billboard)	33
Global 200 (Billboard)	123
Ireland (IRMA)	11
Netherlands (Single Top 100)	94
Norway (IFPI Norge)	86
Sweden (Sverigetopplistan)	63
UK Singles (Official Charts)	20
US Billboard Hot 100	41
US Hot Rock & Alternative Songs (Billboard)	7

=== Year-end charts ===
Year-end chart performance for "Landslide"
Chart (1998)	Position
US Adult Contemporary (Billboard)	25
US Adult Top 40 (Billboard)	57

== Certifications ==
Certifications and sales for "Landslide"
Region	Certification	Certified units/sales
Denmark (IFPI Danmark)	Gold	45,000^{‡}
France (SNEP)	Gold	100,000^{‡}
New Zealand (RMNZ)	7× Platinum	210,000^{‡}
Spain (Promusicae)	Gold	30,000^{‡}
United Kingdom (BPI)	3× Platinum	1,800,000^{‡}
United States (RIAA)	Gold	2,093,186
^{‡} Sales+streaming figures based on certification alone.

== Cover versions ==
=== The Smashing Pumpkins ===
"Landslide"

Song by the Smashing Pumpkins

from the album Pisces Iscariot
- Released: October 4, 1994
- Length: 3:10
- Label: Virgin
- Songwriter: Stevie Nicks
- Producers: Billy Corgan, Ted de Bono

Music video
- "Landslide" on YouTube

Alternative rock band the Smashing Pumpkins recorded an acoustic arrangement of the song that was featured as the B-side to their 1994 single "Disarm" and later on their B-side collection Pisces Iscariot.

The group's arrangement went on to be one of the rock band's most-beloved tracks and even had the approval of Nicks herself. As she told fans during a 1998 online chat with SonicNet, "There's nothing more pleasing to a songwriter than [someone else] doing one of their songs. ['Landslide'] also led me to being friends with Billy Corgan and the possibility that we'll work together," she said of the Smashing Pumpkins frontman. "Over this song, there's been this incredible connection ... he reached out ... I believe that my poetry is really meant for everyone, no matter what age."

The new version was a hit, making it to the top three on the Modern Rock Tracks chart in the United States that year and No. 30 on the US Airplay charts. The song was also featured on the US version of their 2001 greatest hits album Rotten Apples. It was later used in the TV show Alias on season 1 in the 2002 episode "Page 47".

==== Charts ====
Weekly chart performance for "Landslide"
Chart (1994)	Peak position
Canada Top Singles (RPM)	47
US Radio Songs (Billboard)	30
US Alternative Airplay (Billboard)	3

=== Dixie Chicks ===
"Landslide"

Single by Dixie Chicks

from the album Home
- Released: August 26, 2002
- Genre: Country
- Length: 3:50
- Label: Open Wide; Monument; Columbia
- Songwriter: Stevie Nicks
- Producers: Dixie Chicks; Lloyd Maines

Dixie Chicks singles chronology
"Long Time Gone" (2002)	"Landslide" (2002)	"Travelin' Soldier" (2002)

Music video
- "Landslide" on YouTube

American country music group Dixie Chicks released a cover of "Landslide" on August 26, 2002, as the second single from their 2002 album, Home. Lead singer Natalie Maines said she was attracted to the song because she was then the same age that Nicks was when she first performed it. The band performed the song with Nicks at VH1 Divas Las Vegas in 2002.

This version, featuring the band's two- and three-part harmonies, reached the top 10 on the US Billboard Hot 100 and the Billboard Hot Country Songs chart. On the Billboard Adult Contemporary chart, it is the band's only number-one single. After Maines publicly criticised President George W. Bush and the imminent Allied invasion of Iraq, triggering a backlash, it fell to number 43 on the Billboard Hot 100 in one week and left the chart a week later.

Outside the United States, "Landslide" reached number two in Canada and became the band's only top-10 hit in Australia, where it reached number six. It was certified double platinum by the Recording Industry Association of America (RIAA) and triple platinum by the Australian Recording Industry Association (ARIA).

==== Track listings ====
US and Canadian CD single

1. "Landslide" (album version) – 3:49
2. "Landslide" (the Sheryl Crow remix) – 3:47

Australian CD single

1. "Landslide" (the Sheryl Crow remix)
2. "Landslide"
3. "Landslide" (live from the Kodak Theater)
4. "Landslide" (video version)

European maxi-CD single

1. "Landslide" (album version) – 3:49
2. "Long Time Gone" – 4:08
3. "Landslide" (the Sheryl Crow remix) – 3:47
4. "Landslide" (the Sheryl Crow remix—video) – 3:45

UK CD single

1. "Landslide" (the Sheryl Crow remix) – 3:47
2. "Landslide" (album version) – 3:49
3. "Landslide" (live from the Kodak Theater) – 4:07
4. "Landslide" (the Sheryl Crow remix—video version) – 3:45

==== Charts ====
===== Weekly charts =====
Weekly chart performance for "Landslide"
Chart (2002–2003)	Peak position
Australia (ARIA)	6
Canada (Nielsen SoundScan)	2
Ireland (IRMA)	46
New Zealand (Recorded Music NZ)	27
Scottish Singles Sales (Official Charts)	59
UK Singles (Official Charts)	55
US Billboard Hot 100	7
US Adult Contemporary (Billboard)	1
US Adult Pop Airplay (Billboard)	2
US Hot Country Songs (Billboard)	2
US Pop Airplay (Billboard)	13

===== Year-end charts =====
2002 year-end chart performance for "Landslide"
Chart (2002)	Position
Canada (Nielsen SoundScan)	34
US Hot Country Singles & Tracks (Billboard)	48

2003 year-end chart performance for "Landslide"
Chart (2003)	Position
Australia (ARIA)	42
US Billboard Hot 100	35
US Adult Contemporary (Billboard)	17
US Adult Top 40 (Billboard)	19
US Hot Country Singles & Tracks (Billboard)	66
US Mainstream Top 40 (Billboard)	70

==== Certifications ====
Certifications and sales for "Landslide"
Region	Certification	Certified units/sales
Australia (ARIA)	3× Platinum	210,000^{‡}
New Zealand (RMNZ)	2× Platinum	60,000^{‡}
United Kingdom (BPI)	Silver	200,000^{‡}
United States (RIAA)	2× Platinum	2,000,000^{‡}
^{‡} Sales+streaming figures based on certification alone.

==== Release history ====
Release dates and formats for "Landslide"
Region	Date	Format(s)	Label(s)	Ref.
United States	26 August 2002	Country radio	Open Wide; Monument; Columbia	
United States	28 October 2002	Adult contemporary; hot AC; triple A radio	Open Wide; Monument; Columbia	
United States	18 November 2002	Contemporary hit radio	Open Wide; Monument; Columbia	
Australia	24 March 2003	CD	Open Wide; Monument; Columbia	
United Kingdom	7 April 2003	CD	Columbia	

=== Glee version ===
In 2011, the cast of Fox Broadcasting Company's musical television program, Glee, performed the song in season 2, episode 15, "Sexy". Gwyneth Paltrow, Naya Rivera, and Heather Morris are featured on vocals for this version. Stevie Nicks attended the filming of the song and stated that it was a "beautiful mix" of the original and the Chicks version.

=== Other cover versions ===
- Anohni recorded the song for the tribute album Just Tell Me That You Want Me: A Tribute to Fleetwood Mac.
- Harry Styles performed this song with Nicks during his show at the Troubadour in May 2017.
- The Japanese House recorded a cover of this song for Spotify Singles, released 26 July 2017.
- Parodied by Lucy Lawless (in character as Stevie Nicks) in a 17 October 1998 season 24 episode of Saturday Night Live.
- On 12 March 2019, Australian pop singer Conrad Sewell recorded a cover of the song for Australian bank Westpac, in a campaign designed to target families dealing with separation and the resulting financial consequences. Branding in Asia described the rendition as "powerful", while The Music Network's Jake Challenor praised Sewell's performance as "soulful and emotionally charged".
- Gus Dapperton released a cover in 2022 to mark his signing to Warner Brothers Records.
- Brittany Snow (as Bobby-Lynne Parker) and Scott Mescudi (as Jackson Hollis) performed a cover in the Ti West period slasher film X (2022), which is set in 1979, four years after the original song had been released.

== See also ==
- List of Billboard Adult Contemporary number ones of 2003
