= Silver Springs (song) =

1976 song by Fleetwood Mac

Song by Fleetwood Mac

from the album Rumours
- A-side: "Go Your Own Way"
- Released: 20 December 1976
- Recorded: February 1976 – December 1976
- Studio: Record Plant (Sausalito), Wally Heider Studios
- Length: 4:29 (B-side); 4:47 (2004 remastered)
- Label: Warner Bros.; Reprise
- Songwriter: Stevie Nicks
- Producers: Fleetwood Mac; Ken Caillat; Richard Dashut

Audio
- "Silver Springs" on YouTube

"Silver Springs" (live)

Single by Fleetwood Mac

from the album The Dance
- Released: 22 July 1997
- Recorded: 23 May 1997
- Venue: Warner Brothers Studios (Burbank, California)
- Length: 5:41
- Label: Reprise
- Songwriter: Stevie Nicks
- Producers: Lindsey Buckingham; Elliot Scheiner

Fleetwood Mac singles chronology
"I Do" (1995)	"Silver Springs" (live) (1997)	"The Chain" (live) (1997)

Music video
- "Silver Springs" (live) on YouTube

"Silver Springs" is a song written by Stevie Nicks and performed by British-American band Fleetwood Mac. It was originally intended for the band's 1977 album Rumours but became a B-side to the single "Go Your Own Way" instead. The subject of the song is the breakup of the romantic relationship between Nicks and Fleetwood Mac guitarist and vocalist Lindsey Buckingham.

Conflicts over "Silver Springs" led Nicks to leave Fleetwood Mac in 1991; she later re-joined the band in 1997. The song appeared on Fleetwood Mac's 1992 box set, 25 Years – The Chain. A live version of "Silver Springs" was released as a single from the band's 1997 album The Dance; this version of the song was nominated for the Grammy Award for Best Pop Performance by a Duo or Group with Vocals in 1998. "Silver Springs" appeared on a remastered edition of Rumours in 2004; on Nicks's 2007 compilation album, Crystal Visions – The Very Best of Stevie Nicks; and on the physical release of 50 Years – Don't Stop in 2018.

== Composition and recording ==
Written by Stevie Nicks, "Silver Springs" describes the end of her romantic relationship with guitarist Lindsey Buckingham. She said:

I wrote "Silver Springs" about Lindsey. And we were in Maryland somewhere driving under a freeway sign that said Silver Springs [sic]. And I loved the name… Silver Springs sounded like a pretty fabulous place to me. And 'You could be my silver springs' – that's just a whole symbolic thing of what you could have been to me. (Note: Silver Spring, Maryland does not have a plural "s".)

The band recorded the basic tracks for "Silver Springs" at the Record Plant in Sausalito on 11 February 1976 with drums, bass guitar, electric guitar, a Fender Rhodes electric piano, and a scratch vocal. Producer Ken Caillat has said this version had "a much harder feel" than the final mix. Two days later, the band recorded 19 more takes, but none were deemed satisfactory. On the 14th, the band played the song to a click track to keep time. Christine McVie switched from the Fender Rhodes to a grand piano, which was in an isolation room to prevent audio spill from the drums. Buckingham's guitars were fed through a guitar amplifier in one room and a Leslie speaker in another. Nicks sang her vocals into a directional microphone in a siphoned-off section of the studio with sound baffles on the walls. Take eight was deemed satisfactory and used for overdubs.

Further work was conducted at Wally Heider Studios, where Buckingham redid his guitar part. Caillat applied reverb tape delay to the instrument and picked up the upper frequencies of the Stratocaster's guitar strings with a Lavalier microphone; in Caillat's estimation, this gave the guitar a "delicate, glasslike, music box-type sound." During the song's mixing, Caillat applied EQ to the bass drum to remove certain frequencies that resulted in a "nasty popping sound when it was turned up too loud."

== Omission from Rumours and Timespace ==
"Silver Springs" was intended to be released on the album Rumours. However, due to its length and relatively slow tempo, the song was excluded from Rumours over Nicks's strenuous and repeated objections. In his book Making Rumours, Caillat described "Silver Springs" as "gorgeous", "powerful", and "a masterpiece". He added, "there was only one problem: I knew the song was too long to fit on the album." Caillat offered Nicks the option of replacing "Gold Dust Woman", another of her slower compositions, with "Silver Springs", but the idea was not pursued. "Silver Springs" was released in late 1976 as the B-side of the "Go Your Own Way" single, a Buckingham-written song about his breakup with Nicks. In a 1997 documentary on the making of Rumours, engineer and co-producer Richard Dashut called it "the best song that never made it to a record album".

Years later, after Fleetwood Mac's 1990 Behind the Mask Tour, Nicks left the group over a dispute with Mick Fleetwood: the drummer would not allow her to release "Silver Springs" on her 1991 album Timespace – The Best of Stevie Nicks because he planned to include it on a forthcoming Fleetwood Mac box set. Fleetwood felt that "Silver Springs" was in high demand for inclusion on a Fleetwood Mac release as its only other appearance had been as the B-side to "Go Your Own Way". "Silver Springs" subsequently appeared on the 1992 box set 25 Years – The Chain.

== Release as a live single ==
In 1997, Nicks rejoined Fleetwood Mac with Buckingham. A live version of "Silver Springs" appeared on The Dance, a 1997 Fleetwood Mac reunion album which–according to Nicks–was recorded "for posterity". The Dance was recorded across three performances at Warner Bros. Studios. "I never thought that 'Silver Springs' would ever be performed onstage [again]," Nicks reflected during a 1997 MTV interview. "My beautiful song just disappeared [20 years ago]. For it to come back around like this has really been special to me."

The live concert footage for "Silver Springs" used in The Dance was filmed on a sound stage in Burbank, California, on Friday 23 May 1997 before an invited audience of 400. Fred Schruers of Rolling Stone observed this performance, noting the following:

Nicks, who had shown a good deal of power the previous night, was clearly going for the whole enchilada this time. "Time has cast a spell on you, but you won't forget me/I know I could have loved you, but you would not let me," chanted all three singers as Nicks gathered herself, then gripped the microphone and turned toward her ex-lover with every semblance of smoldering anger and hurt: "You'll never get away from the sound of the woman that loved you."

By the time Nicks was virtually shouting, "Was I just a fool?" and "Give me just a chance," Buckingham was peering sideways as he sang his part, eyes guarded behind whatever masking his guitar and microphone stand could afford him.

Nicks said that rehearsals of "Silver Springs" did not resemble the rendition that ultimately appeared on the video version of The Dance. She described the other performances as "good", but felt that they would have been insufficient in cementing the song's legacy:

In six weeks of rehearsal, it was never like that. Only on Friday night did we let it go into something deeper. When we went on Friday, I knew we'd bring it out in case it was the last thing we'd ever do. The other shows were really, really good, but they weren't the show I wanted to leave behind. This show was. I wanted people to stand back and really watch and understand what (the relationship) was.

The live version of "Silver Springs" was released as a radio single in the United States on 22 July 1997, and it was physically issued in the Netherlands the same year. Radio & Records reported in early August that it was the most added song on Adult Alternative, Hot Adult Contemporary and Adult Contemporary stations, including 51 adds in the latter category. According to Broadcast Data Systems, the song garnered 3.8 million audience impressions from its release on 22 July through the middle of August. "Silver Springs" appeared on several charts, including the US Billboard Hot 100 Airplay chart (number 41), the Canadian RPM 100 Hit Tracks chart (number 38), and the Dutch Single Top 100 (number 96).

In 1998, the track was nominated for a Grammy Award for Best Pop Performance by a Duo or Group with Vocals.

== Inclusion on later releases ==
On a remastered edition of Rumours released in 2004, "Silver Springs" was included (as a previously unreleased, slightly longer 4:47 version) between "Songbird" and "The Chain". "We always loved her," remarked musician Danielle Haim. "But when we heard 'Silver Springs' – a song that didn't make Rumours and landed on one of the box sets – we fell in love all over again."

"Silver Springs" also appeared on Nicks's compilation Crystal Visions – The Very Best of Stevie Nicks in 2007. Nicks wrote in the liner notes that the song was intended as a gift for her mother Barbara, who later referred to it as her "rainy day song". Nicks said that the exclusion of the song from Rumours was a source of anger for many years. Nicks was particularly upset that "Silver Springs" initially generated little money for her mother, who was gifted publishing rights for the song in the 1970s. Two months after the release of The Dance, her mother received a royalty check of $50,000 from the song's inclusion on that album. At the insistence of her mother, Nicks included the song on Crystal Visions. Nicks stated that "having that song on this package makes her a part of this."

== Critical reception ==
Rolling Stone wrote that "Nicks' tender yet vengeful post-mortem on her breakup with Buckingham [became] an emotional lightning rod. The song would have behind-the-scenes repercussions for decades to come – nearly leading to the breakup of the band."

In its review of the live recording from The Dance, Billboard said that Nicks was at her "glorious, quirky best here, giving her words a poignant, worldly vibe." Jonathan Rush, a program director from WNOK, expressed skepticism that the live recording would perform well commercially, saying that the song "doesn't jump off the radio like we'd like it to." He nonetheless found the concept of releasing a reworked and unearthed song to be intriguing.

Lauren Boisvert of American Songwriter described Nicks's 1997 performance of "Silver Springs" as "one of the greatest live performances in the history of music". Amanda Petrusich of Pitchfork wrote that the song epitomised "the story of how Buckingham and Nicks lost each other" more than any other song before the release of Tusk. She also highlighted the dynamics between Nicks and Buckingham for live performances of the song and described Nicks' voice as "feral" during the "was I just a fool?" lyric. The Guardian and Paste ranked the song number six and number two, respectively, on their lists of the 30 greatest Fleetwood Mac songs.

== Personnel ==
- Stevie Nicks – vocals
- Lindsey Buckingham – guitar, backing vocals
- Christine McVie – keyboards, piano, backing vocals
- John McVie – bass guitar
- Mick Fleetwood – drums, percussion

== Charts ==
=== Weekly charts ===
Chart (1997)	Peak position
Canada Top Singles (RPM)	38
Canada Adult Contemporary (RPM)	18
Netherlands (Single Top 100)	96
US Radio Songs (Billboard)	41
US Adult Alternative Airplay (Billboard)	16
US Adult Contemporary (Billboard)	5
US Adult Pop Airplay (Billboard)	22
US Pop Airplay (Billboard)	39
US Adult Alternative Tracks (Radio & Records)	14
US Adult Contemporary (Radio & Records)	4
US CHR/Pop (Radio & Records)	33
US Hot AC (Radio & Records)	14
US Rock (Radio & Records)	38

Chart (2025–2026)	Peak position
Ireland (IRMA)	52
Sweden (Sverigetopplistan)	95
US Hot Rock & Alternative Songs (Billboard)	13

=== Year-end charts ===
Chart (1997)	Position
Canada Adult Contemporary (RPM)	68
US Adult Contemporary (Billboard)	32
US Adult Alternative Tracks (Radio & Records)	62
US Adult Contemporary (Radio & Records)	28
US Hot AC (Radio & Records)	49

Chart (1998)	Position
US Adult Top 40 (Billboard)	97

== Certifications ==
Region	Certification	Certified units/sales
New Zealand (RMNZ)	3× Platinum	90,000^{‡}
United Kingdom (BPI)	Platinum	600,000^{‡}
^{‡} Sales+streaming figures based on certification alone.
