= Stand Back =

1983 single by Stevie Nicks

Single by Stevie Nicks

from the album The Wild Heart
- B-side: "Garbo"
- Released: May 19, 1983
- Recorded: February 1983
- Studio: Studio 55 (Los Angeles, California)
- Genre: New wave; synth-rock; electropop
- Length: 4:48 (LP version); 4:18 (single edit)
- Label: Modern
- Songwriter: Stevie Nicks
- Producer: Jimmy Iovine

Stevie Nicks singles chronology
"After the Glitter Fades" (1982)	"Stand Back" (1983)	"If Anyone Falls" (1983)

"Stand Back" is a song by American singer-songwriter Stevie Nicks from her second solo studio album The Wild Heart (1983). The song was released as the lead single from the album in May 1983 and reached number five on the Billboard Hot 100 and number two on the Top Mainstream Rock Tracks chart in August of that year. "Stand Back" has been a staple in Nicks' live shows since its pre-album debut at the 1983 US Festival, and it has also been included in the Fleetwood Mac tour set lists since 1987.

In the United Kingdom, the single was Nicks' first 12-inch release, featuring a different glossy picture sleeve and the inclusion of a third track, "Wild Heart". A 12-inch promotional single was also released to United States radio stations in 1983, featuring a full-colour sleeve, but playing the standard album version (in mono and stereo) on both sides.

== Background and composition ==
Nicks has often told the story of how she wrote "Stand Back". She wrote it on the day of her marriage to Kim Anderson on January 29, 1983. The newlyweds were driving up to San Ysidro Ranch in Santa Barbara when Prince's song "Little Red Corvette" came on the radio. Nicks started humming along to the melody, especially inspired by the lush synthesizers on the song. The couple retrieved a tape recorder and Nicks recorded the demo in the honeymoon suite that night. Later, when Nicks went into the studio to record the song, she called Prince and told him the story of how she wrote the song to his melody. On the night of February 8, 1983, Prince came to the studio and played synthesizers on it, although his contribution is uncredited on the album. He and Nicks did agree however to split the publishing royalties on the song 50-50. Then, she says, "he just got up and left as if the whole thing happened in a dream."

Synth player Dave Bluefield, who also programmed the song's rhythm on a DMX drum machine, said that he played the main chords on the song using an Oberheim OB-Xa synthesizer and Prince did the "8th note up beats" in the upper octaves during the choruses (first heard at the 0:54 mark - supposedly played with just two fingers). It's possible that Prince played other synth parts that didn't make the final mix.

Prince, however, remarked a different story in regards to the song's drum programming and creation: "When I got there, her and Jimmy Iovine couldn't figure out how to work the drum machine...because people were using live drums at that point...so I went down there and programmed it for them and pretty much played most of the song there in about twenty or thirty minutes".

There were two mixes made of the song: the generally more well-known album version (4:48) and the edited single version (4:18). Differences between the two are somewhat subtle, but the single version tends to have more of a "collapsed" or "mono" sound to it and the electronic drum programs are mixed rather dry and flattened, especially in the song's intro bars; whereas the drum tracks on the album version are accentuated by a generous amount of reverb effect and harder compression. Acoustic drums were given a more backseat role on "Stand Back". There is a further "polished" version of the track, with crisper percussion and louder foreground synth, featured on Nicks' 1991 compilation album Timespace: The Best of Stevie Nicks, remixed by Chris Lord-Alge with a run time of 4:59.

“Stand Back” is performed in the key of B minor with a tempo of 116 beats per minute in common time. The song follows a chord progression of A/G – G – D/A – A – D/A – G/B – Bm – A/B – D/A – G/A – A, and Nicks’ vocals span from A_{3} to B_{4}.

== B-side ==
"Garbo", the B-side to "Stand Back", is a song referencing Greta Garbo. Another song, partially inspired by Garbo, called "Greta", appears on the 1994 album Street Angel.

The lyrics from the third verse of "Vogue", by Madonna, coincidentally mention the same first three people — Garbo, Marlene Dietrich and Marilyn Monroe (with the second and third names flipped) as that which is depicted in the lyrics of "Garbo".

== Reception ==
Billboard commented that Nicks' "quirky, stylized singing and moody lyrics" on "Stand Back" were "set to a crisp dance beat, complete with synthesizers and pulsing bass line." Cash Box said that the song represented "both familiar and challenging listening," and combined Nicks' traditional "vamp posture" with dance music.

== Music videos ==
Two music videos were filmed for the single. The first, which was never aired and is referred to as the "Scarlett Version", was a lavish production directed by Brian Grant and features Nicks in a Gone with the Wind type scenario. Upon seeing the completed video, Nicks rejected it as, according to Grant, she felt she looked fat. This version can now be found (with Nicks' commentary) on the DVD supplement of her 2007 collection Crystal Visions – The Very Best of Stevie Nicks.

As an alternative, a second video was made on a much lower budget than the original. Directed by choreographer Jeffrey Hornaday, it features Nicks performing the song behind a microphone in a spotlight-filled room surrounded by glass walls and mirrors, interspersed with shots of choreographed dance sequences. This was the version aired on television and was also included on Nicks' 1986 video compilation I Can't Wait - The Video Collection as well as the aforementioned Crystal Visions compilation DVD.

== Live performances ==
Nicks performed the song as the musical guest on the December 10, 1983 Saturday Night Live episode, with Liberty DeVitto of Billy Joel fame on drums and Marilyn Martin singing backup.

One live performance of the song in Nicks' solo shows is captured in the 2009 CD release The Soundstage Sessions, where Nicks chose the track as the opening number to her show, rather than placing it toward the climactic end of the setlist as per previous tours.

Nicks performed the song on January 30, 2025 at Kia Forum in Inglewood, California for FireAid to help with relief efforts for the January 2025 Southern California wildfires.

Nicks performed the song on the August 25, 2026 episode of Jimmy Kimmel Live.

=== Performances with Fleetwood Mac ===
Nicks began performing "Stand Back" with Fleetwood Mac on the band's 1987 tour. It is included on the Fleetwood Mac live concert video Tango in the Night (recorded in December 1987) and a (slightly extended) audio version from the same show is included in the 4-disc boxed set 25 Years – The Chain. Since then, the song has been performed on every Fleetwood Mac tour (with the exception of the On with the Show Tour) Nicks has been a part of, including the Behind the Mask tour in 1990, The Dance reunion tour in 1997, the Say You Will tour in 2003 (it is featured in the 2004 CD/DVD set Fleetwood Mac: Live in Boston), the 2009 Unleashed Tour, as well as the band's 2013 world tour.

== Legacy ==
Notable artists who performed cover versions of the song include Sky Ferreira and Rod Stewart. Additionally, the song was sampled in the song "No Way to Hide" by German techno band Scooter, which was featured on their 2012 album "Music for a Big Night Out".

== Personnel ==
- Stevie Nicks – vocals
- Sharon Celani – background vocals
- Lori Perry-Nicks – background vocals
- Waddy Wachtel – guitar
- David Williams – guitar
- Steve Lukather – guitar
- Sandy Stewart – synthesizer (possibly credit only)
- Prince - Oberheim OB-8, Roland Jupiter-8 and Oberheim OB-X synthesizers, Oberheim DMX programming
- David Bluefield – Oberheim OB-Xa synthesizer and Oberheim DMX programming
- Marvin Caruso – drums
- Russ Kunkel – drum overdubs
- Bobbye Hall – percussion
- Ian Wallace – percussion

== Charts ==
=== Weekly charts ===
Weekly chart performance for "Stand Back"
Chart (1983–1984)	Peak position
Australia (Kent Music Report)	20
Canada Retail Singles (The Record)	17
Canada Top Singles (RPM)	13
Netherlands (Single Top 100)	29
US Billboard Hot 100	5
US Dance Club Play (Billboard)	12
US Rock Top Tracks (Billboard)	2
US Cash Box Top 100	9
US AOR/Hot Tracks (Radio & Records)	2
US Contemporary Hit Radio (Radio & Records)	2
West Germany (GfK)	32

=== Year-end charts ===
Year-end chart performance for "Stand Back"
Chart (1983)	Position
US Billboard Hot 100	44
US Cash Box Top 100	55
US AOR/Hot Tracks (Radio & Records)	21
US Contemporary Hit Radio (Radio & Records)	27

== Linus Loves version ==
"Stand Back"

Single by Linus Loves featuring Sam Obernik
- Released: November 3, 2003
- Length: 3:22
- Label: Data; Ministry of Sound
- Songwriters: Stevie Nicks; Prince Nelson
- Producers: Linus Loves; Brian Warner; Myles MacInnes

Linus Loves singles chronology
"The Terrace" (2003)	"Stand Back" (2003)	"Night Music" (2004)

In November 2003, Scottish electronic music duo Linus Loves released a cover of "Stand Back" with vocals by Sam Obernik. For this version, Prince was given a writing credit. "Stand Back" reached No. 31 on the UK Singles Chart and No. 73 on the Australian ARIA Singles Chart.

=== Track listings ===
UK CD single

1. "Stand Back" (radio edit)
2. "Stand Back" (vocal club mix)
3. "Stand Back" (instrumental mix)
4. "Stand Back" (video)

UK 12-inch single

A1. "Stand Back" (vocal club mix)
B1. "Stand Back" (Archigram's Summer remix)
B2. "Stand Back" (Mylo's Pastel Bronco remix)

Australian CD single

1. "Stand Back" (radio edit)
2. "Stand Back" (vocal club mix)
3. "Stand Back" (Archigram's Summer remix)
4. "Stand Back" (Mylo's Pastel Bronco remix)
5. "Stand Back" (Linus Loves Friday's Child mix)
6. "Stand Back" (instrumental)

=== Charts ===
Weekly chart performance for "Stand Back" (Linus Loves version)
Chart (2003–2004)	Peak position
Australia (ARIA)	73
Australian Dance (ARIA)	8
CIS Airplay (TopHit)	174
Russia Airplay (TopHit)	165
Ukraine Airplay (TopHit)	84
UK Singles (Official Charts)	31
UK Dance (Official Charts)	14

=== Release history ===
Release dates and formats for "Stand Back" (Linus Loves version)
Region	Date	Format(s)	Label(s)	Ref.
Australia	November 3, 2003	CD	Data; Ministry of Sound	
United Kingdom	November 10, 2003	12-inch vinyl; CD	Data; Ministry of Sound	

== Crystal Visions version ==
"Stand Back – Remixes"

Single by Stevie Nicks

from the album Crystal Visions – The Very Best of Stevie Nicks
- Released: May 29, 2007
- Label: Reprise
- Producer: Jimmy Iovine

Stevie Nicks singles chronology
"Planets of the Universe" (2001)	"Stand Back – Remixes" (2007)	"Crash Into Me" (2009)

The song was remixed and released again as a single on August 28, 2007, to promote Nicks' compilation album Crystal Visions – The Very Best of Stevie Nicks. This time the single went to number two on the US Billboard Dance Club Songs chart and number one on the Billboard Dance Singles Sales chart.

Track listing and formats
No.	Title	Length
1.	"Stand Back" (Tracy Takes You Home Mix)	11:26
2.	"Stand Back" (Tracy Takes You Home Dub)	11:34
3.	"Stand Back" (Tracy Takes You Home Mixshow)	6:53
4.	"Stand Back" (Ralphi's Beefy Retro Mix)	11:12
5.	"Stand Back" (Ralphi's Beefy Retro Edit)	7:30
6.	"Stand Back" (Morgan Page Vox)	7:02
7.	"Stand Back" (Morgan Page Dub)	7:01

=== Charts ===
Weekly chart performance for "Stand Back" (Crystal Visions version)
Chart (2007)	Peak position
US Dance Club Songs (Billboard)	2

=== Year-end charts ===
Year-end chart performance for "Stand Back" (Crystal Visions version)
Chart (2007)	Position
US Dance Club Songs (Billboard)	35

== Notes and references ==
- Timespace – The Best of Stevie Nicks, liner notes
- Crystal Visions – The Very Best of Stevie Nicks, liner notes and commentary
