= The Soundstage Sessions =

Live album by Stevie Nicks
- Released: March 31, 2009
- Recorded: Oct. 2007–2008
- Venues: Grainger, Chicago
- Studios: Ocean Way, Nashville
- Genre: Rock
- Length: 54:25
- Label: Reprise
- Producers: Joe Thomas; Stevie Nicks; Waddy Wachtel

Stevie Nicks chronology
| Crystal Visions – The Very Best of Stevie Nicks (2007) | The Soundstage Sessions (2009) | In Your Dreams (2011) |

The Soundstage Sessions: Live in Chicago
- CD/DVD Deluxe Edition

The Soundstage Sessions is a live album released by American singer-songwriter and Fleetwood Mac vocalist Stevie Nicks. Although it is the first live album of Nicks' solo career, it was produced to sound like a studio album.

== Album information ==
The Soundstage Sessions was recorded in October 2007 before an intimate audience at WTTW's Grainger Studio in Chicago, with the set list containing 18 songs. In early 2008, Nicks went to Ocean Way Studio in Nashville with director/producer Joe Thomas to add "Nashville strings" and additional vocals to the songs that were to go on the CD. Nicks wanted the CD to sound perfect, and when asked about the project has said "I am as proud of this as anything I’ve ever done in my entire career." The album reached #47 on the Billboard 200 with sales of 13,052 and as of February 2011, the album has sold 46,000 copies.

A cover of Dave Matthews' "Crash Into Me" was released as the lead single.

== Track listing ==
| No. | Title | Writer(s) | Length |
|---|---|---|---|
| 1. | "Stand Back" | Nicks | 4:40 |
| 2. | "Crash into Me" | Dave Matthews | 5:33 |
| 3. | "Sara" | Nicks | 6:56 |
| 4. | "If Anyone Falls" | Nicks, Sandy Stewart | 4:07 |
| 5. | "Landslide" (Orchestra Version) | Nicks | 4:20 |
| 6. | "How Still My Love" | Nicks | 7:34 |
| 7. | "Circle Dance" (Duet with Vanessa Carlton) | Bonnie Raitt | 4:14 |
| 8. | "Fall from Grace" | Nicks | 4:35 |
| 9. | "Sorcerer" | Nicks | 5:00 |
| 10. | "Beauty and the Beast" | Nicks | 7:14 |
| Total length: | | | 54:25 |

Amazon MP3 edition
| No. | Title | Writer(s) | Length |
|---|---|---|---|
| 11. | "Enchanted" (Live concert mix) | Nicks | 3:14 |
| Total length: | | | 57:39 |

Deluxe iTunes edition
| No. | Title | Writer(s) | Length |
|---|---|---|---|
| 11. | "Gold Dust Woman" (Live concert mix) | Nicks | 10:07 |
| 12. | "Edge of Seventeen" (Live concert mix) | Nicks | 12:33 |
| Total length: | | | 77:05 |

== Deluxe edition ==
Reprise Records released a Deluxe Edition exclusively through the Warner Bros. Records Store, which is called The Soundstage Sessions: Live in Chicago. The Deluxe Edition is a CD/DVD set, and includes new cover art, a lithograph of Nicks, and free mp3 downloads of "Rhiannon" and "The One".

== DVD and Blu-ray editions ==
The DVD edition of this performance was released by Reprise Records as Live in Chicago. The Blu-ray edition of this performance has been available exclusively at Sears since December 1, 2008 and features a total of 16 tracks in high-definition. It does not include the performances of Dreams or the orchestral version of Landslide, both of which are included on the DVD edition.

== Personnel ==
- Stevie Nicks – vocals, tambourine
- Vanessa Carlton – vocals, solo verse on "Circle Dance"
- Sharon Celani – backing vocals
- Lori Nicks – backing vocals
- Jana Anderson – backing vocals
- Waddy Wachtel – guitar, backing vocals
- Ricky Peterson – keyboards
- Lenny Castro – percussion
- Darrell Smith – keyboards
- Carlos Rios – guitar
- Al Ortiz – bass
- Jimmy Paxson – drums

Orchestra

- Eric Roth – conductor
- Janice MacDonald – flute
- Deb Stevenson – oboe
- Greg Flint – horn
- Christine Worthing – horn
- Guillaume Combet – violin
- Jennifer Cappelli – violin
- Carmen Llop-Kassinger – violin
- Christine Keiko Abe – violin
- Carol Cook – viola
- Jocelyn Davis-Beck – cello
- Eddie Bayers – drums
- Michael Rhodes – bass
- Joe Thomas – keyboards

== Charts ==
| Chart (2009) | Peak position |
|---|---|
| US Billboard 200 | 47 |
| US Billboard Top Current Rock Albums | 15 |
| US Billboard Top Digital Albums | 55 |
| US Billboard Top Internet Albums | 5 |
