= Sometimes It's a Bitch =

1991 single by Stevie Nicks

Single by Stevie Nicks

from the album Timespace: The Best of Stevie Nicks
- B-side: "Desert Angel"; "Battle of the Dragons"
- Released: August 12, 1991
- Genre: Pop rock
- Length: 4:38
- Label: Atlantic; EMI; Modern
- Songwriters: Jon Bon Jovi; Billy Falcon
- Producers: Danny Kortchmar; Jon Bon Jovi

Stevie Nicks singles chronology
| "Whole Lotta Trouble" (1989) | "Sometimes It's a Bitch" (1991) | "Love’s a Hard Game to Play" (1991) |

"Sometimes It's a Bitch" is a song by American singer Stevie Nicks, written by Billy Falcon and Jon Bon Jovi, who also produced the track alongside Danny Kortchmar. It was the first single released from Nicks' compilation album Timespace: The Best of Stevie Nicks (1991). The single peaked at number 56 on the US Billboard Hot 100 and reached the top 20 in Australia and Canada. A music video for the song was filmed, featuring clips of Nicks from 1981 to 1991.

The B-side "Desert Angel" was also taken from the compilation, while the song "Battle of the Dragons" had previously featured on the soundtrack for the film American Anthem.

== Writing and recording ==
In the liner notes for Timespace: The Best of Stevie Nicks, Nicks commented that she initially did not understand what Jon Bon Jovi, the song's primary writer, was trying to say with the track. However, over the following two weeks, she realized that, "Jon, without knowing it, had sort of taken a time machine back eighteen years and watched my life, the good parts...and the bad." She spoke that Bon Jovi "dreamed about what the notorious Stevie Nicks had been like...and what it had all done to her...the indulgences, the lifestyle."

== Critical reception ==
Billboard positively commented that although not written by Nicks, "this introspective rocker sounds as if it was penned by the rock poetess herself." Alex Henderson and Bryan Devaney of Cash Box described the track as "a slick yet edgy pop-rock single." Kent Zimmerman for Gavin Report responded favorably to "Sometimes It's a Bitch", writing that although Nicks did not co-write the track, "she gives the song an excellent reading."

== Track listings ==
- 7-inch and cassette single
1. "Sometimes It's a Bitch" – 4:37
2. "Desert Angel" – 5:21
- 12-inch and CD single
1. "Sometimes It's a Bitch" – 4:36
2. "Desert Angel" – 5:20
3. "Battle of the Dragons" – 5:11

== Personnel ==
Personnel are taken from the Timespace liner notes.

- Benmont Tench – organ
- Robbie Buchanan – synthesizer programming
- Waddy Wachtel – electric guitar
- Danny Kortchmar – electric guitar
- Tico Torres – drums
- Randy Jackson – bass
- Jon Bon Jovi – acoustic guitar
- Sharon Celani – background vocals
- Lori Perry Nicks – background vocals

== Charts ==
=== Weekly charts ===
Weekly chart performance for "Sometimes It's a Bitch"
| Chart (1991) | Peak position |
|---|---|
| Australia (ARIA) | 18 |
| Canada Top Singles (RPM) | 20 |
| European Hot 100 Singles (Music & Media) | 93 |
| European Hit Radio (Music & Media) | 36 |
| Germany (GfK) | 55 |
| New Zealand (Recorded Music NZ) | 39 |
| UK Singles (Official Charts) | 40 |
| UK Airplay (Music Week) | 12 |
| US Billboard Hot 100 | 56 |
| US Mainstream Rock (Billboard) | 7 |
| US Cash Box Top 100 | 43 |
| US Album Tracks (Gavin Report) | 4 |
| US Top 40 (Gavin Report) | 31 |
| US AOR Tracks (Radio & Records) | 6 |

=== Year-end charts ===
Year-end chart performance for "Sometimes It's a Bitch"
| Chart (1991) | Position |
|---|---|
| US AOR Tracks (Radio & Records) | 90 |

== Release history ==
Release dates and formats for "Sometimes It's a Bitch"
| Region | Date | Format(s) | Label(s) | Ref. |
|---|---|---|---|---|
| United Kingdom | August 12, 1991 | 7-inch vinyl; CD; cassette | EMI; Modern | |
| Japan | September 27, 1991 | Mini-album | EMI | |
| Australia | September 30, 1991 | CD | EMI | |
| Australia | October 21, 1991 | Cassette | EMI | |
