= The Lighthouse (Stevie Nicks song) =

Single by Stevie Nicks
- Written: September 6, 2022
- Released: September 27, 2024
- Recorded: 2024
- Genre: Rock
- Length: 4:51
- Label: Warner Records
- Songwriters: Stevie Nicks; Magnus Birgersson; Vincent Villuis
- Producers: Stevie Nicks; Sheryl Crow; Dave Cobb

Stevie Nicks singles chronology
| "For What It's Worth" (2022) | "The Lighthouse" (2024) |

"The Lighthouse" is a song by American singer-songwriter Stevie Nicks, released on September 27, 2024. Written by Nicks, Magnus Birgersson and Vincent Villuis, and produced by Nicks, Sheryl Crow and Dave Cobb, the song was pressed as a white vinyl 7" single.

Nicks promoted the song with performances on Saturday Night Live and Jimmy Kimmel Live.

== Background ==
Nicks based the lyrics on a poem she wrote and posted on social media titled "Get It Back" in September 2022. In a post on her Instagram account, Nicks wrote that she had watched a news broadcast a few months after the overturning of Roe v. Wade by the Supreme Court of the United States about the implications of the court decision. She then wrote song the next morning on September 6, 2022 and recorded a demo later in the evening.

Nicks stating that she wrote it to "stand up for the women of the United States and their daughters and granddaughters".

== Chart performance ==
| Chart (2024) | Peak position |
|---|---|
| UK Singles Downloads (Official Charts) | 48 |
| UK Singles Sales (OCC) | 48 |
| US Digital Song Sales (Billboard) | 17 |
| US Rock Digital Songs (Billboard) | 2 |
