= Whole Lotta Trouble =

1989 single by Stevie Nicks

Single by Stevie Nicks

from the album The Other Side of the Mirror
- B-side: "Ghosts"
- Released: October 30, 1989
- Length: 4:58
- Label: Modern; EMI
- Songwriters: Stevie Nicks; Mike Campbell
- Producer: Rupert Hine

Stevie Nicks singles chronology
"Two Kinds of Love" (1989)	"Whole Lotta Trouble" (1989)	"Sometimes It's a Bitch" (1991)

"Whole Lotta Trouble" is a song by American singer-songwriter Stevie Nicks. The song was written by Nicks and Tom Petty and the Heartbreakers guitarist Mike Campbell and produced by Rupert Hine. It was released on October 30, 1989, as the fourth and final single from Nicks' fourth studio album The Other Side of the Mirror (1989). Although it failed to enter the Billboard Hot 100, it peaked at No. 62 on the UK Singles Chart and No. 22 on the Irish Singles Chart. The song was nominated for the Grammy Award for Best Rock Vocal Performance, Female in 1990.

The song developed from an unreleased song by Nicks called "I Call You Missing" recorded in 1984. This track was recorded again during the Street Angel recording sessions, but it was never released.

== Reception ==
Pan-European magazine Music & Media reviewed "Whole Lotta Trouble" as "a dark-edged, basic rock song with an inspired vocal performance by the normally reserved Nicks."

== Track listings and formats ==
UK 7-inch and cassette single

1. "Whole Lotta Trouble" – 4:58
2. "Edge of Seventeen" – 5:28

UK 12-inch single

1. "Whole Lotta Trouble"
2. "Edge of Seventeen"
3. "Beauty and the Beast" (Live)

UK CD single

1. "Whole Lotta Trouble" – 4:56
2. "Beauty and the Beast" (Live) – 6:23
3. "Rooms on Fire" – 4:35

US 7-inch and cassette single

1. "Whole Lotta Trouble" – 4:26
2. "Ghosts" – 4:50

== Personnel ==
Taken from The Other Side of the Mirror liner notes.

- Jerry Marotta – drums
- Tony Levin – stick bass
- Mike Campbell, Waddy Wachtel, Jamie West-Oram – guitars
- Mike Campbell – slide acoustic guitar
- Rupert Hine – keyboards
- The L.A. Horns, Jerry Hey, Gary Grant, Mark Russo, Larry Williams – brass
- Stevie Nicks, Rupert Hine – percussion
- Lori Perry-Nicks, Sharon Celani – backing vocals

== Charts ==
Chart (1989)	Peak position
Ireland (IRMA)	22
UK Singles (Official Charts)	62
