= Stevie Nicks =

American singer-songwriter (born 1948)

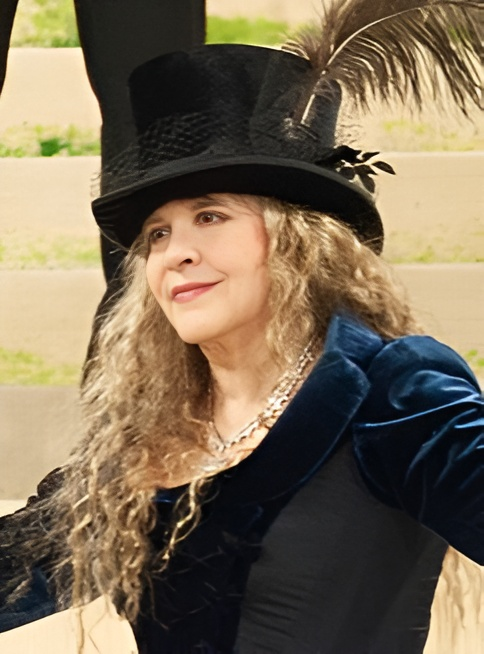
- Nicks at the 2026 Met Gala

Background information
- Born: Stephanie Lynn Nicks; May 26, 1948 (age 78); Phoenix, Arizona, U.S.
- Genres: Rock; pop; blues; folk
- Occupations: Singer; songwriter
- Instruments: Vocals; tambourine
- Works: Solo; Fleetwood Mac
- Years active: 1967–present
- Labels: Atlantic; Modern; Reprise; WEA; Warner Bros.
- Formerly of: Fleetwood Mac; Fritz; Buckingham Nicks; Sound City Players
- Spouse: Kim Anderson (m. 1983; div. 1983)
- Partners: Lindsey Buckingham (1972–1976); Don Henley (1977–1978); Mick Fleetwood (1977–1979); Joe Walsh (1983–1986)

Stephanie Lynn Nicks (born May 26, 1948) is an American singer-songwriter, known for her work with the band Fleetwood Mac. Nicks is also known for her solo career, with a career spanning over five decades. Nicks is widely considered to be one of the greatest female rock singers and one of the most influential musical artists of all time.

After starting her career as a duo with her then-boyfriend Lindsey Buckingham, releasing the album Buckingham Nicks to little success, the pair joined Fleetwood Mac in 1975, helping the band to become one of the best-selling music acts of all time with over 120 million records sold worldwide. Rumours, the band's second album with Nicks, became one of the best-selling albums worldwide, being certified 21× platinum in the US. In 1981, while remaining a member of Fleetwood Mac, Nicks began her solo career, releasing the studio album Bella Donna, which topped the Billboard 200 and has reached multiplatinum status. She has released eight studio albums as a solo artist and seven with Fleetwood Mac, selling a certified total of 65 million copies in the US alone.

After the release of her first solo album, Rolling Stone named her the "Reigning Queen of Rock and Roll". Nicks was named one of the 100 Greatest Songwriters of All Time and one of the 100 Greatest Singers of All Time by Rolling Stone. Her Fleetwood Mac songs "Landslide", "Rhiannon", and "Dreams", with the last being the band's only number one hit in the U.S., together with her solo hit "Edge of Seventeen", have all been included in Rolling Stone's list of the 500 Greatest Songs of All Time. Nicks is the first woman to have been inducted twice into the Rock and Roll Hall of Fame; she was inducted as a member of Fleetwood Mac in 1998 and was inducted as a solo artist in 2019.

Nicks has garnered eight Grammy Award nominations and two American Music Award nominations as a solo artist. She has won numerous awards with Fleetwood Mac, including a Grammy Award for Album of the Year in 1978 for Rumours. The albums Fleetwood Mac, Rumours, and Bella Donna have been included in the "Greatest of All Time Billboard 200 Albums" chart by Billboard. Rumours was also rated the seventh-greatest album of all time in Rolling Stone's list of the "500 Greatest Albums of All Time", as well as the fourth-greatest album by female acts.

== Life and career ==
=== 1948–1971: Early life and career beginnings ===
Stephanie Lynn "Stevie" Nicks was born at Good Samaritan Hospital in Phoenix, Arizona to Barbara (1927–2011) and Jess Nicks. Nicks is of German, English, Welsh, and Irish ancestry.

Nicks had a younger brother, Christopher (1953–2026). Her grandfather, Aaron Jess "A.J." Nicks Sr., taught Nicks to sing duets with him by the time she was four years old. Nicks's mother was protective, keeping her at home "more than most people" and fostered in her daughter a love of fairy tales.

As a toddler, Stephanie could only pronounce her name as "tee-dee", which led to her nickname of "Stevie".

I listened to lots of Top 40 R&B radio. I loved the Shirelles and Martha Reeves and the Vandellas; stuff like "Remember (Walking in the Sand)" by The Shangri-Las... [My grandfather] bought me a truckload of records when I was in the fifth grade. There must have been 150 singles: country, rockabilly, some Everly Brothers, a song called "Party Doll" that went, "Come along and be my party doll/And I'll make love to you."

— Nicks on the music of her youth

Her father's frequent relocation as a vice president of Greyhound had the family living in Phoenix, Albuquerque, El Paso, Salt Lake City, Los Angeles, and San Francisco. With the Goya guitar that she received for her 16th birthday, Nicks wrote her first song, titled "I've Loved and I've Lost, and I'm Sad but Not Blue". She spent her adolescence playing records constantly and lived in her "own little musical world".

While attending Arcadia High School in Arcadia, California, she joined her first band, the Changing Times, a folk rock band focused on vocal harmonies.

Nicks met her future musical and romantic partner, Lindsey Buckingham, during her senior year at Menlo-Atherton High School in Atherton, California. When she saw Buckingham playing "California Dreamin'" at the Young Life club, she joined him in harmony. She recalled, "I thought he was darling." Buckingham was in psychedelic rock band Fritz, but two of its musicians were leaving for college. He asked Nicks, in mid-1967, to replace the lead singer. Fritz later opened for Jimi Hendrix and Janis Joplin from 1968 until 1970. Nicks credits both artists with inspiring her stage intensity and performance.

Nicks and Buckingham attended San José State University, where Nicks majored in speech communication and planned to become an English teacher. With her father's blessing, she dropped out of college to pursue a musical career with Buckingham.

=== 1972–1978: Buckingham Nicks and Fleetwood Mac ===
After Fritz disbanded in 1972, Nicks and Buckingham continued to write as a duo, recording demo tapes at night in Daly City, California, on a one-inch, four-track Ampex tape machine Buckingham kept at the coffee-roasting plant belonging to his father. They secured a deal with Polydor Records, and the eponymous Buckingham Nicks was released in 1973. The album was not a commercial success and Polydor dropped the pair.

With no money coming in from their album, and Buckingham contracting mononucleosis shortly thereafter, Nicks began working multiple jobs. She waited tables and cleaned producer Keith Olsen's house, where Nicks and Buckingham lived for a time before moving in with producer Richard Dashut. She soon started using cocaine. "We were told that it was recreational and that it was not dangerous," Nicks told Chris Isaak in 2009.

While living with Dashut, Buckingham landed a guitar role with the Everly Brothers 1972 tour. Nicks stayed behind working on songwriting herself. During this time, Nicks wrote "Rhiannon" after seeing the name in the novel Triad by Mary Leader. (Five years later, a fan sent her the Mabinogion novels of Evangeline Walton that featured the legendary character Rhiannon, and Nicks later bought the film rights to Walton's work in the hopes of bringing the epic to the screen.) She also wrote "Landslide", inspired by the scenery of Aspen and her slowly deteriorating relationship with Buckingham.

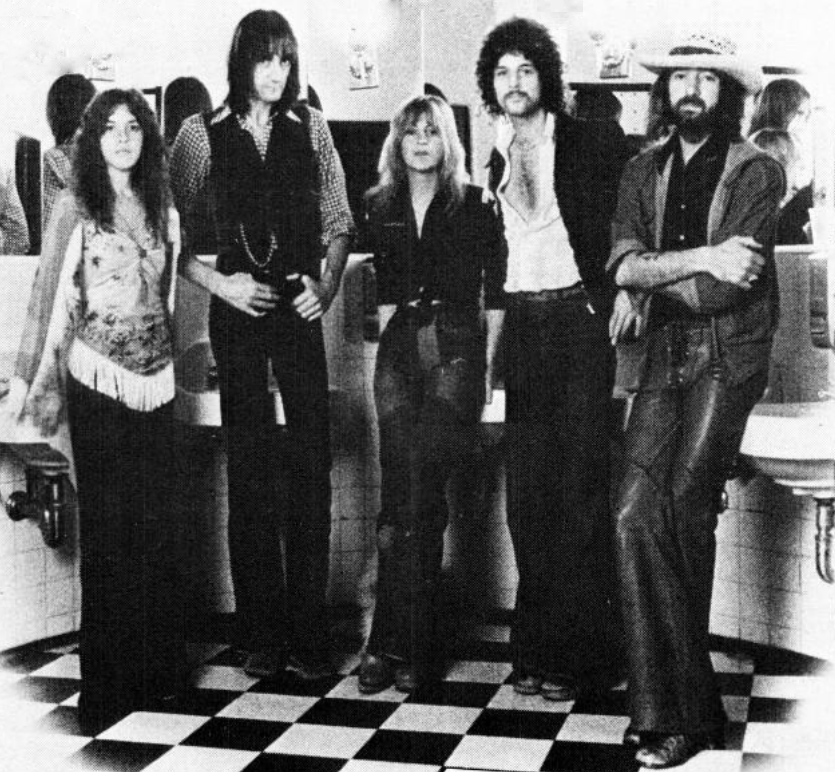
Nicks (far left) with Fleetwood Mac in 1975, several months after joining

In late 1974, Keith Olsen played the Buckingham Nicks track "Frozen Love" for drummer Mick Fleetwood, who had come to Sound City in California in search of a recording studio. Fleetwood remembered Buckingham's guitar work when guitarist Bob Welch departed to pursue a solo career. On December 31, 1974, Fleetwood called Buckingham, inviting him to join the band. Buckingham refused, insisting that Nicks and he were "a package deal" and that he would not join without her. The group decided that incorporating the pair would improve Fleetwood Mac. The first rehearsals confirmed this feeling, with the harmonies of the newcomers adding a pop accessibility to the band's former style of blues-based rock.

In 1975, Fleetwood Mac achieved worldwide success with the album Fleetwood Mac. Nicks's "Rhiannon" was voted one of The 500 Greatest Songs of All Time by Rolling Stone. Her live performances of the song throughout the decade began to take on a theatrical intensity which differs from how the song plays on the album. The song built to a climax in which Nicks's vocals were so impassioned that Mick Fleetwood declared, "her 'Rhiannon' in those days was like an exorcism." "Landslide" became another hit from the album, with three million airplays.

Becoming aware of her image as a performer, Nicks worked with clothing designer Margi Kent to develop a unique onstage look. Her costumes had a bohemian style that featured flowing skirts, shawls, and platform boots.

While Nicks and Buckingham achieved professional success with Fleetwood Mac, their personal relationship was eroding. Nicks ended the relationship. Fleetwood Mac began recording their follow-up album, Rumours, in early 1976 and continued until late in the year. Also, Nicks and Buckingham sang back-up on Warren Zevon's eponymous second album.

Among Nicks's contributions to Rumours was "Dreams", which became the band's only Billboard Hot 100 number-one hit single. Nicks had also written and recorded the song "Silver Springs", but it was not included on the album because the early versions of the song ran too long, and the band did not want too many slow songs on the album. Studio engineer and co-producer Ken Caillat said that Nicks was very unhappy to find that the band had decided against her song "Silver Springs", which he said was beautifully crafted, and carried some of the band's best guitar work. The song was replaced by another Nicks composition, I Don't Want to Know, which still gave her three tracks on the album. "Silver Springs", written about her romantic relationship with Buckingham, was released as a B-side of the "Go Your Own Way" single—Buckingham's equally critical song about Nicks. Copies of the single eventually became collector's items among fans of Fleetwood Mac. "Silver Springs" was included on the four-disc Fleetwood Mac retrospective 25 Years – The Chain in 1992.

Nicks in 1977

Rumours, Fleetwood Mac's second album after the incorporation of Nicks and Buckingham, was the best-selling album of 1977, and as of 2017, had sold over 45 million copies worldwide, making it one of the best-selling albums of all time. The album remained at number one on the American albums chart for 31 weeks and reached number one in other countries. The album won the Grammy Award for Album of the Year in 1978. It produced four U.S. Billboard Hot 100 top ten singles, including Nicks's "Dreams".

In November 1977, after a New Zealand concert on the Rumours Tour, Nicks and Fleetwood secretly began an affair. Fleetwood was married to Jenny Boyd. "Never in a million years could you have told me that would happen," Nicks has stated. "Everybody was angry because Mick was married to a wonderful girl and had two wonderful children. I was horrified. I loved these people. I loved his family. So, it couldn't possibly work out. And it didn't. I just couldn't." Nicks ended the affair soon after it began. She has stated that had the affair progressed, it "would have been the end of Fleetwood Mac". By October 1978, Mick Fleetwood left Boyd for Nicks's friend Sara Recor.

=== 1979–1982: Tusk and Mirage ===
After the success of the Rumours album and tour in 1977 to 1978, Fleetwood Mac began recording their third album with Nicks and Buckingham, Tusk, in the spring of 1978. By this time, Nicks had amassed a large backlog of songs that she had been unable to record with Fleetwood Mac because of the constraint of having to accommodate three songwriters on each album. Tusk was released on October 19, 1979. Mirage was recorded in late 1981 and early 1982.

=== Backup vocals and duets ===
While working on Tusk, Nicks sang backup on virtually every track of Not Shy, recorded by musician Walter Egan, a friend of both Nicks and Buckingham's. "Magnet and Steel", inspired by Nicks, prominently featured her backup vocals and became a hit single on the Billboard Hot 100 chart during the summer of 1978. Lindsey Buckingham also produced the album, playing guitar and providing backing vocals on some of the tracks. Nicks recorded the hit duets "Whenever I Call You Friend" with Kenny Loggins in 1978, and "Gold" with John Stewart in 1979. During 1981, Nicks made occasional guest appearances with Tom Petty and the Heartbreakers on their Hard Promises tour.

=== Solo career ===
Nicks wrote and recorded demonstrations for a solo project during Tusk sessions in 1979 and the Tusk world tour of 1979–80. Nicks, Danny Goldberg, and Paul Fishkin founded Modern Records to record and release Nicks's material.

Nicks's first solo album, Bella Donna, was released on July 27, 1981, to critical and commercial acclaim, reaching number one on the Billboard 200 chart, with four singles making the Billboard Hot 100, and Rolling Stone deeming her "the Reigning Queen of Rock and Roll".

The day that Bella Donna reached number one on the Billboard 200, Nicks was told that her friend Robin Anderson had leukemia. Anderson was pregnant at the time and given only three months to live. She gave birth to a son, appointing Nicks as the child's godmother. "I never got to enjoy Bella Donna at all because my friend was dying. Something went out that day; something left." Following Robin's death in 1982, Nicks married Robin's widower, Kim Anderson, believing that Robin would want her to care for the baby. "We were all in such insane grief, just completely deranged," she told the Telegraph in 2007. They divorced three months later.

Bella Donna introduced Nicks's permanent back-up singers, Sharon Celani and Lori Perry (now Nicks after marrying Stevie's brother Christopher), who have contributed vocals to all of Nicks's solo albums since then. In November 1981, Nicks embarked on her White Winged Dove tour, which she had to cut short to record Mirage.

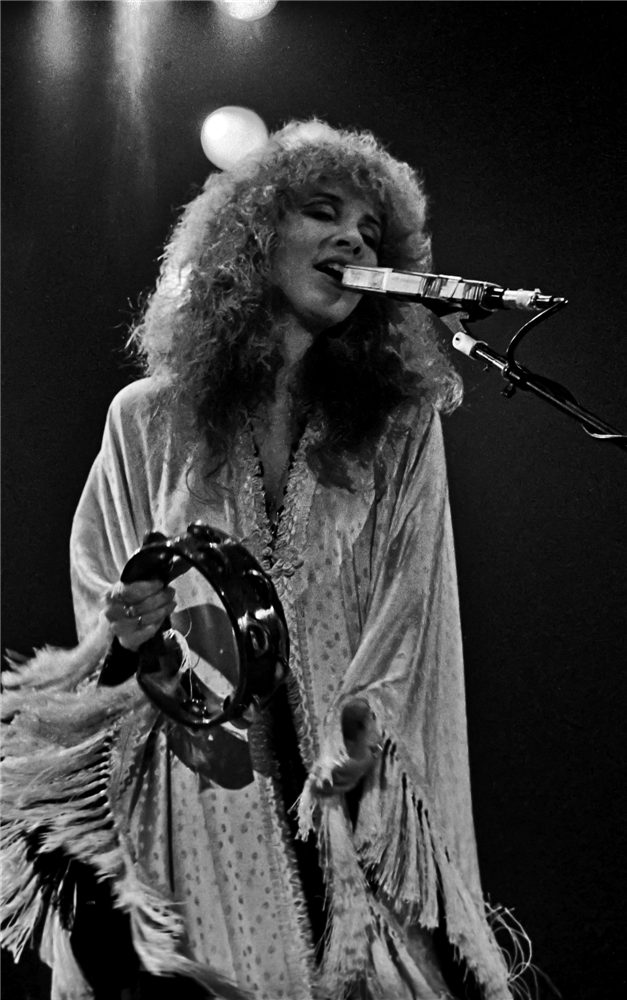
Nicks performing in 1980

Nicks released her second solo album, The Wild Heart, on June 10, 1983. The album went double platinum, reached number five on the Billboard 200 albums chart, and featured three hit singles. It also introduced songwriter and performer Sandy Stewart as co-writer and vocalist.

Nicks performed at the second US Festival at Glen Helen Regional Park in San Bernardino, California, and later toured the U.S. from June 1983 to November 1983. Nicks appeared on Saturday Night Live in December 1983, performing "Stand Back" and "Nightbird".

Following the tour for The Wild Heart, Nicks commenced work on her third solo album. Originally titled Mirror Mirror, Nicks recorded songs for the album during 1984. However, Nicks was unhappy with the album, and opted to record a new batch of songs in 1985. Rock a Little, as it was retitled, was released November 18, 1985, to commercial success, supported by three successful singles. Nicks toured for Rock a Little until October 1986, and performed with Bob Dylan and Tom Petty and the Heartbreakers during their tour in Australia.

The tour marked a turning point in Nicks's life. The January before the tour was to begin, a plastic surgeon warned her of severe health problems if she did not stop using cocaine. "I said, 'What do you think about my nose?'", she recalled on The Chris Isaak Hour in 2009. "And he said, 'Well, I think the next time you do a hit of cocaine, you could drop dead.'" At the end of the Australian tour, Nicks checked herself into the Betty Ford Center for 30 days to overcome her cocaine addiction. Recalling the early deaths of Janis Joplin and Jimi Hendrix, she would later tell an interviewer:

I saw... how they went down, and so there was a part of me that said 'I want to go down with them also', and another part of me that said, 'isn't it too bad that Jimi Hendrix isn't still here... isn't it really very sad that Janis Joplin is not still here'... that's the sad part, is... that there would be no more work from Jimi Hendrix, that there would be no more work from Janis Joplin... I think that I would be very sad if some 25-year-old lady rock-and-roll singer in ten years said, 'I wish Stevie Nicks had just thought about it a little more careful, and been around to maybe do another, you know, Complete Works of Stevie Nicks... that's kind of what stopped me and made me really look at the world through clear eyes.

Later that year, on the advice of friends concerned that she might relapse, she visited a psychiatrist, who prescribed the sedative Klonopin to help her remain free from cocaine.

=== 1987–1990: Tango in the Night, The Other Side of the Mirror, and Behind the Mask ===
In late 1985, Fleetwood Mac began work on Tango in the Night, but due to her promotional schedule for the Rock a Little album and subsequent tour, Nicks was mostly unavailable to work on the album with the band except for a few weeks following her stay at the Betty Ford Center in 1986 (which was the inspiration for the song "Welcome to the Room...Sara"). She sent the band demonstrations of her songs to work on in her absence. The album was released in April 1987 and became the band's second-highest selling album, behind Rumours.

Creative differences and unresolved personal issues within the band led Buckingham to quit the group right before their world tour. According to bassist John McVie, a "physically ugly" confrontation between Nicks and Buckingham ensued when Nicks angrily challenged Buckingham's decision to leave the band.

The band embarked on the Shake the Cage tour in September 1987, with Buckingham replaced by Rick Vito and Billy Burnette. The tour was suspended while Nicks suffered from myalgic encephalomyelitis/chronic fatigue syndrome and developed an addiction to Klonopin, though it resumed in 1988. Tango in the Night met with commercial success and was followed by Fleetwood Mac's Greatest Hits album in November 1988.

Also in 1988, Nicks began work on a fourth solo album with English record producer Rupert Hine. The Other Side of the Mirror was released on May 11, 1989, to commercial success. Nicks became romantically involved with Hine.

Nicks toured the U.S. and Europe from August to November 1989. She later said she had "no memory of this tour" because of her increasing dependency on Klonopin, prescribed in ever increasing amounts by a psychiatrist between 1987 and 1994, in an attempt to keep Nicks from regressing to her former abuse of cocaine.

In 1989, Nicks set to work with Fleetwood Mac on Behind the Mask, released in 1990 to moderate commercial success in the U.S. In the UK, however, the album entered the chart at number one and was certified platinum. The band went on a world tour to promote the album, on the last night of which Buckingham and Nicks reunited on stage to perform "Landslide". After the tour concluded, Nicks left the group over a dispute with Mick Fleetwood, who would not allow her to release the 1977 track "Silver Springs" on her album Timespace: The Best of Stevie Nicks, because of his plans to save it for release on a forthcoming Fleetwood Mac box set. Fleetwood knew that the song would be valuable as a selling point for the box set, since over the years, it had gained interest among the band's fans.

=== 1991–1996: Timespace and Street Angel ===
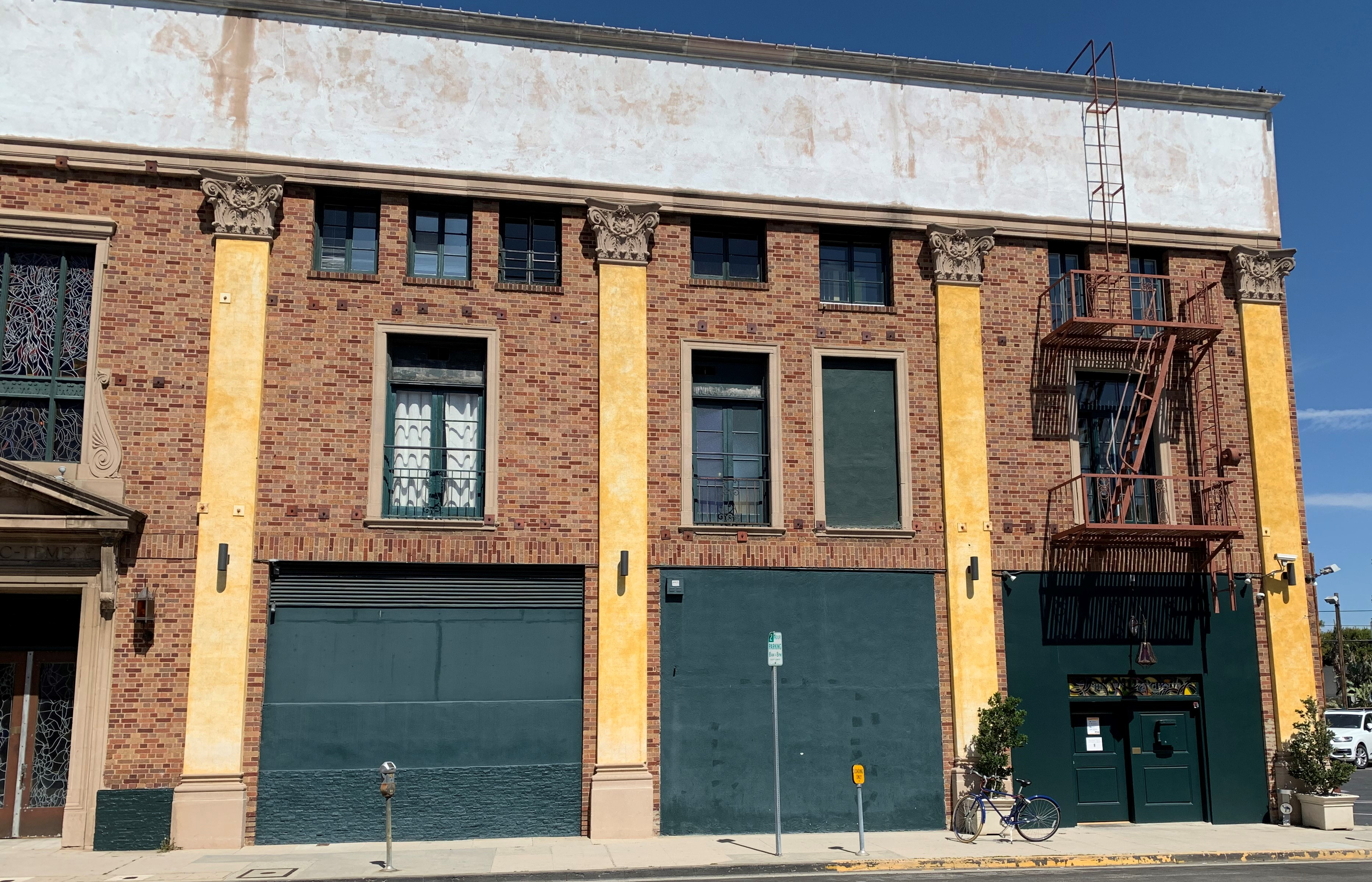
The Village Recording Studio in Los Angeles, where Nicks recorded several of her solo works throughout the 1980s and 90s

On the 10th anniversary of her solo career debut, Nicks released Timespace: The Best of Stevie Nicks on September 3, 1991. The following year, Fleetwood Mac also released a four-disc box set, 25 Years – The Chain, which included "Silver Springs".

During the 1992 U.S. presidential campaign, Bill Clinton used the Fleetwood Mac hit "Don't Stop" as his campaign theme song, and Nicks rejoined the classic Rumours lineup of the band (including Buckingham) to perform the song at Clinton's 1993 inaugural gala. No plans for an official reunion were made at that time. Nicks was criticized for her weight gain.

Following her successful detox, Nicks released her fifth solo album, Street Angel, recorded during 1992 and 1993 using material written mostly in previous years. Released on May 23, 1994, Street Angel was poorly received, reaching number 45 on the Billboard Top 200. Nicks has since expressed major disappointment with the album, claiming that a lot of its production work took place during her second stint in rehabilitation, meaning she had little or no say over the final product.

Despite a three-month tour in support of the album, Nicks was crushed by the focus on her weight and the poor reception of the album.

In 1996, Nicks reunited with Lindsey Buckingham and contributed the duet "Twisted" to the Twister movie soundtrack, while in 1996, the Sheryl Crow-penned "Somebody Stand by Me" featured on the Boys on the Side soundtrack, and Nicks also remade Tom Petty's "Free Fallin'" for Fox's TV hit Party of Five.

=== 1997–2001: The Dance, Enchanted, and Trouble in Shangri-La ===
In 1996, Lindsey Buckingham, working on a planned solo album, enlisted the help of Mick Fleetwood and John McVie, which eventually led to a reunion of the entire band. A newly invigorated Nicks joined Fleetwood Mac for The Dance, a highly successful 1997 tour that coincided with the 20th anniversary of the release of Rumours. Prior to the tour, Nicks started work with a voice coach, to lend her voice more control and protect it from the stress of lengthy touring schedules. She also went on a diet and started jogging to lose weight.

The band's live CD The Dance was released to commercial and critical acclaim. The Dance earned the group several Grammy nominations, including a nomination for the Grammy Award for Best Pop Performance by a Duo or Group with Vocals for their live performance of "Silver Springs". In 1998, Nicks joined the group for its induction into the Rock and Roll Hall of Fame. That same year, Fleetwood Mac was awarded the Outstanding Contribution at the BRIT Awards.

Nicks put work on a new solo album on hold when she was approached by Warner Music to release a solo career-spanning box set, to finish her contract with Atlantic Records in the U.S. After the culmination of the Fleetwood Mac reunion tour, Nicks settled down in Los Angeles and Phoenix with close friends and colleagues to devise a track list for this three-disc collection.

The box set Enchanted was released to acclaim on April 28, 1998, with liner notes from Nicks, as well as exclusive rare photographs, and pages from her journals. Nicks supported the box set with a successful U.S. tour. In 1998, Nicks contributed to the Practical Magic soundtrack and performed in Don Henley's benefit concert for the Walden Woods Project.

Nicks had begun writing actively for Trouble in Shangri-La in 1994 and 1995, as she came out of her Klonopin dependency. According to her, friend and former musical partner Tom Petty was responsible for convincing her to write music again when he rebuffed her request that he write a song with her. She resumed recording songs for the Trouble in Shangri-La album with Sheryl Crow, who produced and performed on several tracks. When a scheduling conflict forced Crow to drop out of the project, Nicks first approached R&B producer Dallas Austin, but these sessions have never surfaced. Nicks finally called on John Shanks to produce the remainder of the album, with additional contributions from David Kahne, Rick Nowels, Pierre Marchand, and Jeff Trott. Artists Natalie Maines, Sarah McLachlan, and Macy Gray contributed to some of the tracks.

Released May 1, 2001, Trouble in Shangri-La restored Nicks's solo career to critical and commercial success. "Planets of the Universe" was nominated for a Grammy Award for Best Female Rock Vocal Performance, and Nicks was named VH1's "Artist of the Month" for May 2001. Nicks was named one of People magazine's 50 Most Beautiful People, was featured in a well-received Behind the Music episode, and performed an episode of the VH1 Storytellers Concert Program. Nicks made several television appearances in support of the album and performed at the 2001 Radio Music Awards.

Nicks supported the album with a successful tour, although some shows were canceled or postponed because of her bout with acute bronchitis. Shows were also canceled because of the September 11 attacks in the U.S.

=== 2002–2009: Say You Will, Crystal Visions, and Soundstage Sessions ===
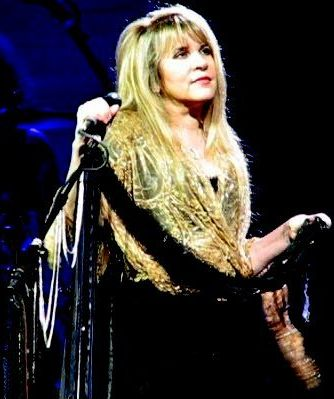
Nicks in June 2008

In 2001, Fleetwood Mac began work on a new studio album, though this time without Christine McVie, leaving Nicks as the sole woman in the band for the first time. After the end of her solo tour, Nicks convened with the other members of the band for recording a new album, Say You Will, which was released in April 2003 and met with commercial success, but mixed reviews. Nicks joined the group to support the album with the Say You Will Tour, which lasted until September 2004.

She subsequently stated in interviews that she was not happy with the album or world tour that followed, citing production disputes with Buckingham as a core factor, as well as the absence of fellow female band member Christine McVie. A documentary of the making of the album, Destiny Rules, was released on DVD in 2004 and chronicles the sometimes-turbulent relationships between band members, especially Buckingham and Nicks, during that time in the studio.

After a few months' respite from the Say You Will tour, Nicks did a four-night stint in May 2005 at Caesars Palace in Las Vegas, and then did 10 shows with Don Henley dubbed the Two Voices tour. During the summer of 2005, Nicks continued doing solo shows (Gold Dust tour) with pop singer Vanessa Carlton as the opening act, playing over 20 dates nationwide.

On March 27, 2007, Reprise Records released Crystal Visions – The Very Best of Stevie Nicks in the U.S. The album debuted at number 21 on the Billboard 200 albums chart.

The compilation includes her hit singles, a dance remix, and one new track, a live version of Led Zeppelin's "Rock and Roll". Two versions of this album were made, one with just the audio CD and a deluxe version that includes a DVD featuring all of Nicks's music videos with audio commentary from Nicks herself, as well as rare footage from the Bella Donna recording sessions.

A tour with Chris Isaak, opening in Concord, California, on May 17, 2007, supported the release.

Reprise Records initially released two radio-only promotions, the live version of "Landslide" with the Melbourne Symphony Orchestra and "Rock and Roll". Both tracks failed to garner much airplay and made no impact on the charts. Reprise Records released "Stand Back" (issued with club mixes) on May 29, 2007. "Stand Back", which peaked at number five on the pop singles chart in 1983 and number two on the Billboard Club chart. Nicks previously reached number one on this chart, with "Planets of the Universe" (from Trouble in Shangri-La) in 2001. The remix single of "Stand Back" debuted on the Billboard Hot Singles Sales chart on September 15, 2007, at number 10, peaking at number four the following week. It also debuted on the Billboard Hot Dance Singles Sales chart at number three, later peaking at number one.

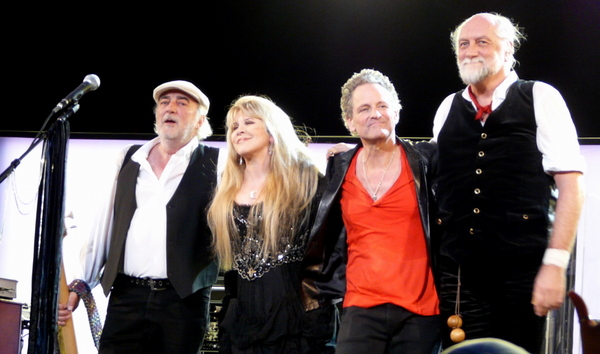
From left to right: John McVie, Nicks, Lindsey Buckingham, and Mick Fleetwood of Fleetwood Mac in 2009

In late 2008, Fleetwood Mac announced that the band would tour in 2009, beginning in March. As per the 2003–2004 tour, Christine McVie would not be featured in the lineup. The tour was branded as a 'greatest hits' show titled "Unleashed", although they played album tracks such as "Storms" and "I Know I'm Not Wrong".

On March 31, 2009, Nicks released the album, The Soundstage Sessions, via Reprise Records. The album debuted at number 47 on the Billboard 200 albums chart. The first single from the album, "Crash into Me", was released as a digital download, along with "Landslide" (orchestra version) as a B-side, on March 17, 2009.

=== 2010–2013: In Your Dreams and Extended Play tour ===
After completing the Unleashed tour with Fleetwood Mac, Nicks began work on her first solo album in a decade with David A. Stewart, a musician and record producer best known for being one half of the duo Eurythmics.

Nicks performed in a series of shows in August 2010 ("it's not really a tour", she said). They did not contain any of her new music, because she did not want it to end up on YouTube. The Santa Barbara show benefited a young girl she had met through the Make-a-Wish Foundation in Los Angeles with rhabdomyosarcoma, a rare cancer.

On January 13, 2011, Reprise announced Nicks's upcoming album In Your Dreams would be released on May 3, and the lead single, "Secret Love", would be released on February 8. Reprise provided a free download of the single to fans who ordered the album via certain websites. Nicks originally wrote "Secret Love" in 1976 and recorded a demo of it for Fleetwood Mac's 1977 album, Rumours. It did not make the final cut for the album. The demo version had been circulating among fans for many years prior to its inclusion on In Your Dreams. Nicks promoted the song with a video directed by Dave Stewart. Nicks's goddaughter Kelly appears in the video wearing a vintage dress that Nicks wore on stage in 1976. According to Nicks, Kelly portrays the young Nicks blending with the soul of Nicks's 62-year-old self. On the U.S. Billboard charts, "Secret Love" was a modest hit on the Adult Contemporary Singles chart, peaking at number 20, and at number 25 on the Triple-A Singles chart. Another song on the album, "For What It's Worth", features Nicks's niece in the video. The song reached number 25 on the Billboard Adult Contemporary chart in September 2011. A documentary film was made for the album, directed by Stewart. The documentary was critically acclaimed, and Nicks appeared at many film festivals to support the documentary.

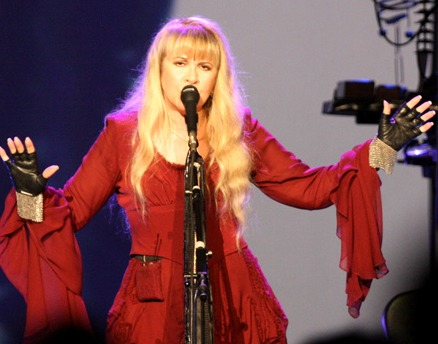
Nicks performing with Dave Stewart in November 2011

Nicks promoted the album with appearances on various television shows, including The Tonight Show with Jay Leno, The X Factor, The Talk, Good Morning America, The Ellen DeGeneres Show, The Oprah Winfrey Show, and Dancing with the Stars.

In Your Dreams was well received by music critics. Rolling Stone commented, "It's not just her first album in 10 years, it's her finest collection of songs since the Eighties". The album debuted at number six on the Billboard 200, giving Nicks her fifth top-10 album on that chart, with 52,000 copies sold in the first week. Elsewhere, the album has made numerous top-50 debuts, including number 24 on the Australian ARIA chart, number 22 in Canada, and number 14 in the UK.

The same day that Nicks's new album was released, Fox Network broadcast the Glee episode (Season 2, Episode 19) "Rumours" that featured six songs from Fleetwood Mac's 1977 album, including Nicks's song "Dreams" (the band's only number-one song on the U.S. charts). The show sparked renewed interest in the band and its most commercially successful album, and Rumours re-entered the Billboard 200 chart at number 11, the same week that In Your Dreams debuted at number six. Nicks was quoted by Billboard saying that her new album was "my own little Rumours".

Nicks contributed a cover of Buddy Holly's "Not Fade Away" for the tribute album Listen to Me: Buddy Holly, released in September 2011.

On March 29, 2012, Nicks made a guest appearance as herself on the NBC sitcom Up All Night. The show featured an excerpt of the 1981 track "Sleeping Angel", as well as new duets with both Maya Rudolph and Christina Applegate of "Whenever I Call You Friend" and "Edge of Seventeen".

On December 14, 2012, Nicks was announced to be featured on an original track done in collaboration with Dave Grohl for his Sound City soundtrack, alongside other artists.

In 2013, Fleetwood Mac toured again as a four-piece band throughout North America and Europe. On April 30, the band released their first new studio material since 2003's Say You Will via digital download on iTunes with the four-track EP, Extended Play containing three new songs and one new song from the Buckingham Nicks sessions ("Without You").

On December 3, 2013, Nicks released the In Your Dreams documentary film on DVD. The DVD debuted at number seven on the Billboard Top Music Video sales chart and number 29 on the UK Music Video Top 40 chart.

=== 2014–present: 24 Karat Gold: Songs from the Vault and future endeavors ===
In 2014, Nicks appeared on the third season of television series American Horror Story, Coven, in a role she reprised in the eighth season, American Horror Story: Apocalypse. She played a fictional version of herself, portraying a "white witch" with supernatural powers in three episodes. On the show, she performed the songs "Rhiannon", "Has Anyone Ever Written Anything for You?", "Seven Wonders", and "Gypsy".

"I said 'That's perfect,'" she told Us magazine in response to the show's music request. "Because that's exactly how I like to affect people. I want people to put my songs on because they are unhappy and need a boost to dance around their apartment a little and feel good. That's why I write. 'Of course, you can use my music. Take it!'" In May 2014, Nicks was honored with a BMI Icon Award. In July 2014, it was announced that Nicks would join The Voice as the adviser for Adam Levine's team.

In September 2014, Nicks released her eighth studio album, 24 Karat Gold: Songs from the Vault, which reached number seven on the Billboard 200. She also began a North American tour with Fleetwood Mac, now reunited with Christine McVie, the On with the Show tour. The tour began in September 2014 and concluded in November 2015.

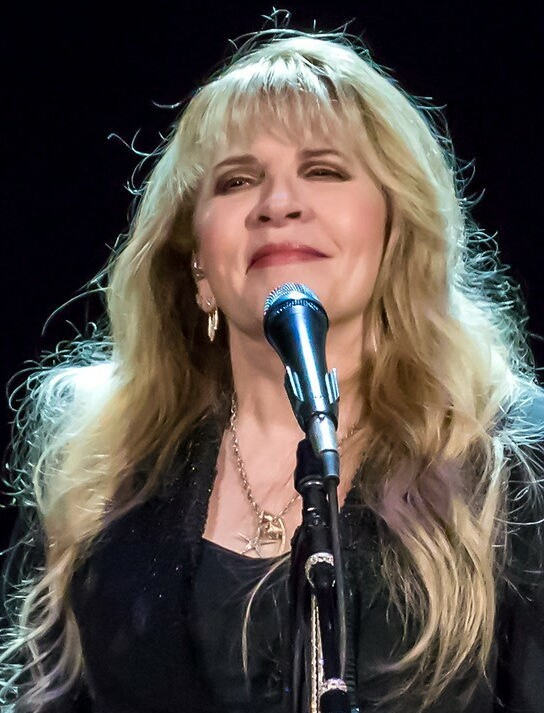
Nicks performing in 2017

In May 2015, Nicks reissued Crystal Visions – The Very Best of Stevie Nicks on "crystal clear" transparent double vinyl. The vinyl came with a vinyl messenger bag and a limited-edition lithograph. Throughout 2016 and 2017, Nicks toured with The Pretenders on the 24 Karat Gold Tour.

On April 26, 2017, Pitchfork revealed that Nicks would be featured on a track from American singer Lana Del Rey's fifth studio album, Lust for Life, which was released on July 21, 2017. The song is titled "Beautiful People Beautiful Problems".

On July 9, 2017, Nicks performed at the British Summer Time festival in Hyde Park in London, supporting Tom Petty and the Heartbreakers. She later performed "Stop Draggin' My Heart Around" with Petty as part of the Heartbreakers' set, in what would turn out to be their final performance of the song together before Tom Petty's death in October 2017.

In April 2018, Lindsey Buckingham was fired from Fleetwood Mac, following disagreements with Nicks and Mick Fleetwood. Nicks helped recruit his replacements, Mike Campbell of Tom Petty and the Heartbreakers and Neil Finn of Crowded House. This reworked lineup embarked on a world tour entitled An Evening with Fleetwood Mac in 2018–2019.

In April 2019, Nicks was inducted into the Rock and Roll Hall of Fame. She became the first woman to be inducted twice, once as a member of Fleetwood Mac and once as a solo artist.

In September 2020, Nicks released a live album and concert film, with recordings from the 24 Karat Gold Tour (2016–2017), directed by Joe Thomas. On October 9, 2020, Nicks released her first new music in six years. The official video accompanying the track "Show Them the Way" was directed by Cameron Crowe. In December 2020, music publishing company Primary Wave bought an 80% stake of Nicks's song catalog. The Wall Street Journal valued the deal at US$100 million.

On May 27, 2021, Stevie Nicks was one of the headliners of the 2021 Shaky Knees Music Festival in Atlanta, Georgia. In August 2021, Nicks canceled her five planned 2021 solo appearances due to concern about catching COVID-19.

Nicks appeared on the track "Oil" on the 2023 Gorillaz album Cracker Island.

Nicks sang "What Has Rock and Roll Ever Done for You" with Dolly Parton on her Rockstar album in 2023.

On September 27, 2024, Nicks released a new song called "The Lighthouse". Nicks wrote the song with Magnus Birgersson and Vincent Villuis to promote women's rights. Nicks appeared as a featured vocalist on a cover of Ron Sexsmith's "Maybe This Christmas" on the charity Christmas album A Philly Special Christmas Party, released on November 22, 2024.

Nicks performed at the 2026 Met Gala, performing "Landslide" in a duet with Sabrina Carpenter. In August 2026, Nicks performed at the first ever Daisy Chain Fields Festival, where she performed "Landslide" in a duet with festival founder and headliner Olivia Rodrigo.

== Artistry ==
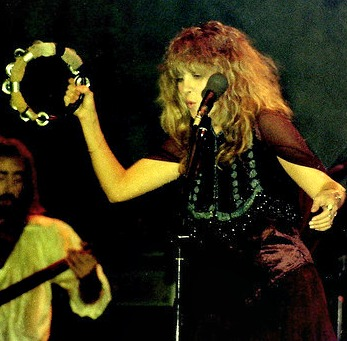
Nicks performing in 1977

At 5 feet 1 inch (1.55 m) tall, Nicks has stated she felt "a little ridiculous" standing next to Mick Fleetwood, who is 6 feet 6 inches (1.98 m). For this reason, she developed a penchant for 6-inch (15 cm) platform boots. "Even when platforms went completely out of style, I kept wearing them because I didn't want to go back to being 5 feet 3 inches (1.60 m) in heels", she told Allure in 1995. Over the years, Nicks has developed a style which she calls her "uniform", consisting of flowing diaphanous clothing, boots and shawls.

Nicks's music encompasses the pop and blues sounds of Fleetwood Mac, while her debut solo album Bella Donna (1981) cemented her status as one of the biggest stars in rock music. Nicks has said that her vocal style and performance antics evolved from female singers such as Grace Slick and Janis Joplin. She admitted inspiration when she saw Joplin perform live (and opened for her with her first band Fritz) shortly before Joplin's death. Nicks owns a strand of Joplin's stage beads. She also commented that she once saw a woman in her audience dressed in dripping chiffon with a Gibson Girl hairstyle and big boots, and Nicks knew she wanted something similar. She took the look and made it her own. Nicks possesses a contralto vocal range, and her voice has been described as "gruff" and "feathery". Over the years, she has decorated her microphone stand with roses, ribbons, chiffon, crystal beads, scarves, and small stuffed toys.

=== Style ===
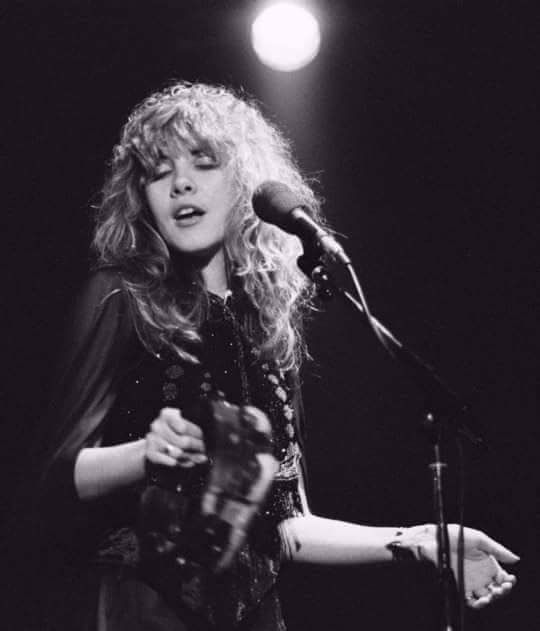
Nicks performing c. 1980. She can be seen wearing a flowing black dress and shawls while playing a tambourine, both of which became some of her defining traits.

Nicks's style has remained the same throughout her years in the spotlight and even "at 60 she is still working the gossamer tunics and shawls that have influenced two generations of Stevie acolytes and given her performances the feel of a Wiccan ritual," writes New York Times reporter Ruth La Ferla.

In the late '70s, Nicks began receiving threatening mail accusing her of witchcraft. Nicks told the Los Angeles Times in 2013, "In the beginning of my career, the whole idea that some wacky, creepy people were writing, 'You're a witch, you're a witch!' was so arresting. And there I am like, 'No, I'm not! I just wear black because it makes me look thinner, you idiots.'" The witch rumors frightened Nicks so much that she gave up black for a period of time (roughly 1978 to 1982), instead opting to wear colors such as apricot and seafoam green. Nicks later stated that she felt ugly in the new colors, ultimately gave up, and went back to black in 1983. That same year, when asked what she thought about people who still believed the rumor, Nicks said, "I don't like it all and I wish people would stop thinking about that, because I spent thousands of dollars on beautiful black clothes and had to stop wearing them for a long time, because a lot of people scared me."

== Legacy ==
Many artists have cited Nicks as a source of influence and musical inspiration. These include Beyoncé and Destiny's Child, Courtney Love, Michelle Branch, Belinda Carlisle, the Chicks (formerly known as Dixie Chicks), Mary J. Blige, Sheryl Crow, Nadia Ali, Florence Welch, Taylor Swift, Vanessa Carlton, Delta Goodrem, and Lorde. Australian singer Darren Hayes cited Nicks as one his favorite musicians during his teenage years, while Eminem's mother Debbie Nelson mentioned in her book My Son Marshall, My Son Eminem that her son loved the song "Rhiannon".

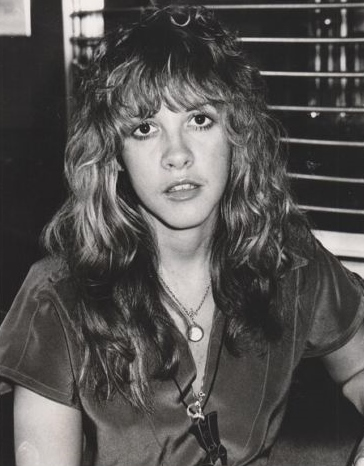
Nicks in 1977

"I met her after my first Grammys in '95. One of the great things about Stevie is that she doesn't disappoint you. I was really nervous, but she's such a warm person. I felt like I'd known her forever… Another great thing about Stevie is that she's going to continue to make great music. I remember sitting with her in a hotel room in Atlanta and she pulled out her journals. She writes all the time. She showed me stuff and, before you knew it, it was a great song. That's so unique and hugely inspiring. There aren't many artists like that." – Sheryl Crow

The Dixie Chicks covered "Landslide", which became a top ten hit (number one on the Adult Contemporary chart) and number one on the Country chart. This cover earned Nicks a BMI Songwriters Award in 2003 when it won Song of the Year (the award is given to the songwriter of the track, regardless of the performer). According to BMI, "Landslide" also earned Nicks the 35th Robert J. Burton Award as "Most Performed Country Song of the Year". This distinction is given to the song tallying the most feature U.S. broadcast performances during the eligibility period. Included on the Dixie Chicks' platinum Monument album Home, "Landslide" was a Country, Adult Top 40, Hot 100 and AC Billboard charts smash. Alternative rock band the Smashing Pumpkins made an acoustic cover of the song that was featured on their 1994 B-side collection Pisces Iscariot.

Other successful covers have included the Corrs' "Dreams" and Courtney Love's band Hole with "Gold Dust Woman". "Edge of Seventeen" was sampled on Destiny's Child's 2001 number one single "Bootylicious". Nicks appeared in the video for "Bootylicious" and, in an episode of MTV's Making the Video that featured it, she expressed her admiration for the song and the group. American actress and singer Lindsay Lohan covered "Edge of Seventeen" on her second studio album A Little More Personal (Raw) (2005). Deep Dish fulfilled their "dreams" of working with Nicks in 2005 when Nicks offered to rerecord vocals on a remix of her number-one song, "Dreams". The Deep Dish version reached number two on the Billboard Hot Dance Airplay chart, and provided Nicks with her third UK top forty hit. Nicks provided additional vocals on Vanessa Carlton's 2007 album, Heroes and Thieves.

On January 31, 2010, Nicks performed with Taylor Swift at the 52nd Annual Grammy Awards. Swift, who describes Nicks as one of her childhood heroes, introduced her to the audience with, "It's a fairy tale and an honor to share the stage with Stevie Nicks." In 2024, Swift referenced Nicks in the song "Clara Bow", from her eleventh studio album The Tortured Poets Department: "You look like Stevie Nicks in '75, the hair and lips." Nicks contributed a poem to the album's liner notes.

In October 2018, Nicks was one of fifteen artists to be nominated for induction to the Rock and Roll Hall of Fame. On December 13, 2018, she was announced as one of seven inductees to the Rock and Roll Hall of Fame class of 2019, making her the first woman to be inducted twice to the hall.

== Philanthropy ==
Nicks has started a charity foundation titled Stevie Nicks's Band of Soldiers, which is used for the benefit of wounded military personnel.

In late 2004, Nicks began visiting Army and Navy medical centers in Washington, DC. While visiting wounded service men and women, she became determined to find an object she could leave with the soldiers that would raise their spirits, motivate, and give them something to look forward to each day. She eventually decided to purchase hundreds of iPod Nanos, load them with music, artists, and playlists she would hand select, and autograph them:

I call it a soldier's iPod. It has all the crazy stuff that I listen to, and my collections I've been making since the 1970s for going on the road, when I'm sick ... or the couple of times in my life that I have really been down, music is what always dances me out of bed.

— Stevie Nicks, The Arizona Republic.

She now regularly delivers these tokens of her appreciation, bringing her closest friends, such as Mick Fleetwood, along to share the experience:

So, as Mick [Fleetwood] and I went from room to room delivering their tiny iPod, they told us their stories. Mick became his tall, loving, father figure, English self, taking in every word they said, remaining calm (at least on the outside) inspiring them. We floated from room to room down through the halls of the two hospitals over a three-day period. We gave out all our iPods. Right before I left for DC, Steven Tyler and Joe Perry dug into their pockets and came up with $10,000 for me. In my eyes they went from the coolest rock stars to generous great men; as my press agent Liz Rosenberg said, every returning wounded soldier should be given an iPod. It will be an integral part of their recovery.

— Stevie Nicks

== Personal life ==
=== Health ===
Nicks developed a severe addiction to Klonopin. She, who is 5 feet 1 inch (1.55 m), had gained weight, peaking at 175 lb (79.4 kg). "Klonopin was worse than the cocaine," she has said. "I lost those 8 years of my life. I didn't write, and I had gained so much weight."

In late 1993, while Nicks held a baby shower at her house, she tripped over a box, passed out, and cut her forehead near a fireplace. "I'm one of those people who doesn't injure themselves. I was horrified to see that blood. I hadn't had enough wine. I knew it was the Klonopin," she said. Realizing that she needed help, Nicks endured a painful 47-day detoxification in a hospital. Disgusted by the criticism she received during the Street Angel tour for being overweight, she vowed to never set foot on a stage again unless she slimmed down.

=== Relationships and family ===
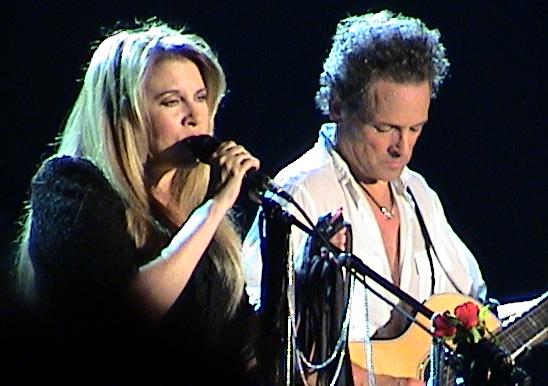
Nicks and former boyfriend Lindsey Buckingham in 2003

Nicks was romantically linked to Lindsey Buckingham from 1972 to 1976. She was linked to Mick Fleetwood in 1978, Eagles drummer/vocalist Don Henley during the late 1970s, and briefly to Eagles songwriter JD Souther. In 1979, Nicks had an abortion after becoming pregnant by Henley. She was involved with Jimmy Iovine, who produced Bella Donna, during 1980–81, and with Eagles and James Gang guitarist Joe Walsh during 1983–1986, to whom she referred in 2007 as one of her greatest loves, but the couple could not sustain the relationship because of mutual drug abuse. Nicks toured with Walsh in 1984 and wrote "Has Anyone Ever Written Anything for You?" about Walsh's deceased daughter.

Nicks's only marriage was to Kim Anderson, the widower of her best friend Robin Anderson. They married in 1983 soon after Robin Anderson died of leukemia while the Bella Donna album was on the top of the charts. Nicks later explained of the marriage, "I was determined to take care of [Robin's] baby, so I said to Kim, 'I don't know, I guess we should just get married.'" Nicks and Anderson divorced after only three months: "And so we got married three months after she died, and it was a terrible, terrible mistake. We didn't get married because we were in love, we got married because we were grieving and it was the only way that we could feel like we were doing anything."

Years after the divorce, she reunited with her step-son when he was a teenager, putting him through college, and has maintained contact with him ever since. In 2020, Nicks said in an interview for The Guardian that his daughter, named Robin after his late mother, calls Nicks "Grandma Stevie".

Nicks has said that she consciously chose not to have children of her own, due to her demanding career and desire to follow her art wherever it should take her: "My mission maybe wasn't to be a mom and a wife; maybe my particular mission was to write songs to make moms and wives feel better."

Of her niece, godchildren, step-son, and extended family she says: "I have lots of kids. It's much more fun to be the crazy auntie than it is to be the mom, anyway."

Nicks has maintained a journal nearly every day since her tenure in Fleetwood Mac began. She has said, "I like to tell all my fairy goddaughters and my niece that when I'm gone they can sit on the floor and go through all these journals, and they can walk through my life, and they can smell the gardenia perfume on the pages. They can have it in their hands, who I was."

Regarding a book based on her life, she has said, "I wouldn't write a book unless I could really tell the truth, and say all the people are in it are represented right ... If I'm gonna talk about all the people in my life, I need to be old enough and so do they, that nobody's gonna care ... I would never write a book about the bad parts. I would mostly revel in the fantastic parts, of which there were so many."

Her brother, Christopher Nicks, died September 4, 2026, after a brief battle with cancer.

=== Residences ===
Until July 2007, Nicks lived in Paradise Valley, Arizona, a suburb of Phoenix, in a home she had built in 1981 and shared with her brother, his wife and their daughter. She announced in mid-2007 that her Paradise Valley home would be put up for sale, citing her aspirations to "downsize" and focus more on her charity work, and that in the previous year she had only "spent about two weeks there". The house was put on the market for a reported $3.8 million and later sold for $3 million. She owns an oceanside home in Santa Monica, California.

=== Religion ===
In 1998, she said, "I think there is definitely a God. I think there was definitely an angel with me all the way through the bad times. Somebody keeping me safe. I feel very spiritual now. I really believe that God makes my music good and makes me able to deliver it...there has to be some outside help–this can't all be happening on its own." She told Billboard that same year, "I am religious...I believe there’ve been angels with me constantly through these last 20 years, or I wouldn't be alive. I pray a lot. In the last few years I’ve asked for things from God, and he's given them to me. And there were things I thought were going to kill me, and he fixed them."

Nicks became an ordained minister with the Universal Life Church and officiated at the wedding of Deer Tick singer John McCauley and singer-songwriter Vanessa Carlton on December 27, 2013.

== Discography ==
=== Studio albums ===
- Bella Donna (1981)
- The Wild Heart (1983)
- Rock a Little (1985)
- The Other Side of the Mirror (1989)
- Street Angel (1994)
- Trouble in Shangri-La (2001)
- In Your Dreams (2011)
- 24 Karat Gold: Songs from the Vault (2014)

=== With Lindsey Buckingham ===
- Buckingham Nicks (1973)

=== With Fleetwood Mac ===
- Fleetwood Mac (1975)
- Rumours (1977)
- Tusk (1979)
- Mirage (1982)
- Tango in the Night (1987)
- Behind the Mask (1990)
- Say You Will (2003)

== Filmography ==
Title	Year	Role	Notes
Destiny Rules (with Fleetwood Mac)	2003	Herself	DVD Documentary
Rock Legends: Platinum Weird	2006	Herself	Television film
Up All Night	2012	Herself	Episode: "Letting Go"
Stevie Nicks: In Your Dreams	2013	Herself	Documentary; also director and executive director
American Horror Story: Coven	2014	Herself	Episodes: "The Magical Delights of Stevie Nicks" and "The Seven Wonders"
The Voice	2014	Herself	Mentor for Team Adam (season 7)
American Horror Story: Apocalypse	2018	Herself	Episode: "Boy Wonder"
24 Karat Gold: The Concert	2020	Herself	Concert film

== Tours ==
Solo tours

- White Winged Dove (Bella Donna) Tour: 1981
- The Wild Heart Tour: 1983
- Rock a Little Tour: 1986
- The Other Side of the Mirror Tour: 1989
- Whole Lotta Trouble (Timespace) Tour: 1991
- Street Angel Tour: 1994
- Enchanted Tour: 1998
- Holiday Millennium Tour: 1999–2000
- Trouble in Shangri-La Tour: 2001
- Two Voices Tour (with Don Henley): 2005
- Gold Dust Tour (on select dates with Vanessa Carlton or John Farnham): 2005–06
- Highway Companion Tour (with Tom Petty and the Heartbreakers): 2006
- Crystal Visions Tour: 2007–08
- Soundstage Sessions Tour: 2008
- Heart & Soul Tour (with Rod Stewart): 2011–12
- In Your Dreams Tour: 2011–12
- 24 Karat Gold Tour: 2016–17
- Live in Concert: 2022–25

In October 2005, Nicks attended the Melbourne Cup Week in Australia, and one of the horse-racing stakes was named after her: The Stevie Nicks Plate. She used this opportunity to launch her promotion of an Australian/New Zealand extension to her Gold Dust tour in February and March 2006. Nicks toured in Australia and New Zealand with popular Australian performer John Farnham. She also appeared in concert with Tom Petty in June near Manassas, Virginia, and at the Bonnaroo Music Festival that same month.

In 2006, Nicks performed with Tom Petty and the Heartbreakers for the first leg of their tour in the summer, and later in the year returned as a guest performer for a number of songs on the tour celebrating Petty's 30th anniversary since his debut album. Tom Petty's Homecoming Concert in Gainesville, Florida, which contained performances with Stevie Nicks, was filmed for PBS Soundstage as well as DVD release for March 2007. Nicks was also the featured performer for Bette Midler's benefit function, Hulaween, in October 2006.

In 2008, Nicks embarked on the Soundstage Sessions tour in the U.S. A video recording of one concert date was released in 2009: Live in Chicago. Vanessa Carlton performed as a guest artist.

Rod Stewart and Nicks co-headlined the Heart & Soul Tour. Launched March 20, 2011, in Fort Lauderdale, Florida, the tour united the two singers for a series of arena concerts throughout North America – with performances in New York, Toronto, Los Angeles, Philadelphia, Chicago, Detroit, Tampa, Montreal, and more.

A solo tour for In Your Dreams began on August 9, 2011, in Denver, Colorado. Nicks announced on her July 27 appearance on America's Got Talent that Michael Grimm would be going on tour with her. She then continued on an Australian and New Zealand leg of the tour accompanied by Dave Stewart until December 2011.

Nicks joined Rod Stewart in the summer of 2012 for another leg of the Heart & Soul Tour, and resumed the In Your Dreams tour in June 2012. In 2023, she and Billy Joel performed a series of concerts across the United States, beginning with SoFi Stadium outside Los Angeles on March 10. This was in conjunction with a solo tour. In early 2024, she announced a European leg to the tour, starting in Dublin, Ireland on July 3.

Touring band 2012

- Sharon Celani – backing vocals (1981–present)
- Waddy Wachtel – lead guitar, musical direction (1981–86, 2001–present)
- Lori Nicks – backing vocals (1981–89, 1996, 2007–present)
- Carlos Rios – rhythm guitar (1989–present)
- Al Ortiz – bass (2001–present)
- Jimmy Paxson – drums (2005–present)
- Darrell Smith – keyboards (2005–present)
- Brett Tuggle – keyboards, rhythm guitar (1998–2006, 2012)

== Awards and nominations ==
=== Grammy Awards ===
Solo

Nicks has been nominated for eight Grammy Awards as a solo artist, holding the record for most nominations for Best Female Rock Vocal Performance without a win.

Year	Category	Recording	Result
1982	Best Rock Vocal Performance By a Duo or Group	"Stop Draggin' My Heart Around" (with Tom Petty and the Heartbreakers)	Nominated
1982	Best Female Rock Vocal Performance	"Edge of Seventeen"	Nominated
1984	Best Female Rock Vocal Performance	"Stand Back"	Nominated
1985	Best Album of Original Score written for a Motion Picture or Television Special	Against All Odds (with Various Artists)	Nominated
1987	Best Female Rock Vocal Performance	"Talk to Me"	Nominated
1988	Best Performance Music Video	Stevie Nicks: Live at Red Rocks	Nominated
1991	Best Female Rock Vocal Performance	"Whole Lotta Trouble"	Nominated
2002	Best Female Rock Vocal Performance	"Planets of the Universe"	Nominated

With Fleetwood Mac

Nicks has been nominated for six Grammy Awards as a member of Fleetwood Mac, winning the 1978 Grammy Award for Album of the Year for Rumours, and received the 2003 Grammy Hall of Fame Award.

Year	Category	Recording	Result
1978	Album of the Year	Rumours	Won
1978	Best Pop Performance By a Duo or Group	Rumours	Nominated
1978	Best Arrangement of Voices	"Go Your Own Way"	Nominated
1998	Best Pop Vocal Album	The Dance	Nominated
1998	Best Pop Performance By a Duo or Group	"Silver Springs"	Nominated
1998	Best Rock Performance By a Duo or Group	"The Chain"	Nominated
2003	Grammy Hall of Fame Award	Fleetwood Mac	Won

== See also ==
- List of American Grammy Award winners and nominees
- List of artists who reached number one on the U.S. dance chart
- List of number-one dance hits (United States)
