= Chillout 2003/The Ultimate Chillout =

Compilation album by various artists
- Released: March 11, 2003
- Genre: Chill-out
- Length: 72:19
- Label: Nettwerk

The Ultimate Chillout chronology
Chillout 2002/The Ultimate Chillout (2002)	Chillout 2003/The Ultimate Chillout (2003)	Chillout 04/The Ultimate Chillout (2003)

Professional ratings
Review scores
Source	Rating
AllMusic	2.5/5 stars

Chillout 2003/The Ultimate Chillout is a compilation album released by Nettwerk. It is the third from The Ultimate Chillout franchise.

== Track listing ==
Adapted from AllMusic and the album's official liner notes.

No.	Title	Writer(s)	Performer	Length
1.	"Love"		Delerium and Zoë Johnston	3:57
2.	"Olivia Newton Christ"		LHB	4:53
3.	"In This World"	Moby	Moby	3:58
4.	"Love Can Damage Your Health"	Fabrice Dumont; Stephan Haeri; Angel McCluskey	Télépopmusik	4:11
5.	"Fine Day" (Frakker Mix)		Kirsty Hawkshaw	6:05
6.	"Wavy Gravy"		Sasha	6:38
7.	"Hear You Now" (Grand Chillas Mix)	Frank Tomiczek	Hooligan	5:49
8.	"Black" (William Orbit Mix)	Sarah McLachlan	Sarah McLachlan	4:28
9.	"Lean on Me" (featuring Colein) (Solarstone's Afterhours Remix)	Linda Duggan; Elliot Jones; Nick Woolfson	Sounds from the Ground	7:35
10.	"Tears from the Moon" (featuring Sinéad O'Connor) (Carmen Rizzo Chillout Mix)		Conjure One	4:33
11.	"My Culture" (featuring Maxi Jazz and Robbie Williams)	Duncan Bridgeman; Jamie Catto; Maxi Jazz; Williams	1 Giant Leap	5:26
12.	"North Pole Transmission"		FC Kahuna	4:51
13.	"The 15th" (featuring Lizzy Yoder)	Colin Newman	Fischerspooner	3:56
14.	"Your Silent Face"	New Order	New Order	5:59
Total length:				72:19
