= Hello (Poe album) =

Studio album by Poe
- Released: October 10, 1995
- Recorded: 1994–1995
- Studios: RJ Rice (Detroit); Eldorado (Los Angeles); Ocean Way (Los Angeles); 49 Windows & Pro-Tools System (Los Angeles); Sonora (Los Angeles); Po-Go Palace (Hollywood)
- Genres: Alternative rock; trip hop; R&B
- Length: 41:24
- Labels: Modern; Atlantic
- Producers: RJ Rice; Jeffrey Connor; Dave Jerden; Poe

Poe chronology
Hello (1995)	Haunted (2000)

Singles from Hello
- 1. "Angry Johnny" Released: 1995; 2. "Hello" Released: October 1996; 3. "Trigger Happy Jack" Released: 1996

Professional ratings
Review scores
Source	Rating
AllMusic	4/5 stars
The Encyclopedia of Popular Music	3/5 stars
Music Central Online	3/5 stars
MusicHound Rock	2.5/5 stars

Hello is the debut album by the American singer-songwriter Poe. It was released in 1995 on Modern Records.

== Background ==
Aside from the Detroit studio of album producer RJ Rice, the recording of Hello took place at a variety of studios in Los Angeles.

The first music video for the album was for the single "Angry Johnny"; it featured Poe on the skeletal frame of a bed looking forlorn whilst destroying a variety of effects one might associate with romance (like roses or a box of chocolates). The song's rage-filled lyrics quickly found her being lumped into the "angry female rocker" category, and the video was heavily played on MTV's Alternative Nation. The second single, "Hello", did not fare as well, until a remix version was released two years after the album's initial release. At least one other track (Junkie) was remixed as well, since the 1999 CD-quality download of 'Hello' contains a version of 'Junkie' with more instrument layers (horns and warbly guitar) that is 6 seconds shorter than the 3:06 original.

Hello was certified gold by the Recording Industry Association of America on November 20, 1996.

== Critical reception ==
Trouser Press wrote that "Poe has enough personality to keep the pleasant and occasionally intriguing album her own, but not enough to make it a strong statement." MusicHound Rock: The Essential Album Guide called the album "a mess of over-personal, overproduced folk songs," aside from "Trigger Happy Jack" and "Angry Johnny." Tulsa World wrote that Poe "rips and rocks, but she doesn't kick out the jams at the expense of the songcraft." Glen Ballard in an interview on Spotify's Landmark series quoted "Around the time, I was making this record Jagged Little Pill, I heard some tracks by an artist named Poe. I heard a couple of these things and it really blew my mind. As much as anything, the Poe record, "Hello", was probably the biggest influence I had at that time, honestly, because it was a brilliant record that had jazz influence, hip hop, electronic, rock. It was a hybrid of the first degree."

== Track listing ==
All lyrics are written by Poe.

No.	Title	Writer(s)	Length
1.	"Hello"	Poe; Ronnie Estelle	4:31
2.	"Trigger Happy Jack (Drive By a Go-Go)"	Poe; Jeffrey Connor	3:36
3.	"Choking the Cherry"	Poe; Connor	3:34
4.	"That Day"	Poe; Cameron Stone	2:41
5.	"Angry Johnny"	Poe; Ralph James Rice	4:18
6.	"Dolphin"	Poe; Sean Uberoi Kelly	3:47
7.	"Another World"	Poe; Rice	3:20
8.	"Fingertips"	Poe; Rice; James Yancey	4:21
9.	"Beautiful Girl"	Poe; Alex Blanc; Eric Garcia	3:42
10.	"Junkie"	Poe; Rice	3:06
11.	"Fly Away"	Poe	4:34

Sample credits

- "Fingertips" contains a vocal sample from "Like a Lover" as performed by Sérgio Mendes and Brasil '66.

== Personnel ==
Credits adapted from CD liner notes.

Musicians

- Poe – vocals (all tracks), piano (11), programming (8), additional programming (7)
- Richard Barrow – flute (11)
- Alex Blanc – guitar (9)
- Jon Brooks – drums (3)
- Lionel Cole – programming (2, 8)
- Jeffrey Connor – bass guitar (2, 3, 5, 9), bass programming (1), guitar (3)
- Ronnie Estelle – programming (1)
- Amp Fiddler – keyboards (8)
- Eric Garcia – guitar (9), keyboards (9)
- Karl Givens – trumpet (8)
- Joey Grossman – guitar (5)
- Sean Uberoi Kelly – bass (6), guitar (6), programming (6)
- Dean Pleasants – guitar (2)
- RJ Rice – keyboards (7), programming (5, 7, 10)
- Matt Sorum – drums (2, 9)
- Cameron Stone – cello (4)
- Jeffery L. Walker Jr. – keyboards (6), additional keyboards (8), keyboard programming (5), additional programming (10)
- Tony Wilson – guitar (1, 3)
- Jay Dee – programming (8)

Technical

- Poe – production (3, 4, 9, 11), co-production (1, 2, 6, 7), editing, mixing (3, 4, 11)
- Jeffrey Connor – production (3), co-production (2)
- Dave Jerden – executive production, production (2), engineering (1, 8), mixing (1, 2, 8)
- RJ Rice – production (1, 5–8, 10), engineering (1, 5, 6, 8, 10), mixing (5, 6, 10)
- Richard Barrow – engineering (4, 11)
- James Beaty – engineering assistance (8)
- Alex Blanc – editing, engineering (3)
- Brian Carlstrom – engineering (1)
- Annette Cisceros – engineering assistance (1, 8)
- Amanda Cruz – engineering assistance (5, 6, 8, 10, production coordination
- Eric Garcia – editing, engineering (3), mixing (9)
- Steve Klein – engineering (2, 8), mixing (2, 8)
- Eddy Schreyer – mastering
- Slam – engineering assistance (5, 6, 8, 10)

Design

- Beau Barton – art direction, design, cover photography
- Thomas Bricker – art direction, design, additional photography
- Amanda Cruz – photography
- Marty Levin – back cover photography
- Poe – lyric collages

== Chart positions ==
Chart (1996)	Peak position
US Billboard 200	71
US Top Heatseekers Albums (Billboard)	4

Singles – Billboard (US)

Year	Single	Chart	Peak position
1995	Trigger Happy Jack (Drive by a Go-Go)	Modern Rock Tracks	27
1996	Angry Johnny	Modern Rock Tracks	7
1996	Hello	Modern Rock Tracks	13
1997	Hello (Remixes)	Hot Dance Music/Club Play	1

== Certifications ==
Region	Certification	Certified units/sales
United States (RIAA)	Gold	626,000
^{^} Shipments figures based on certification alone.
