= List of number-one hits of 1994 (Italy) =

This is a list of the number-one hits of 1994 on Italian Hit Parade Singles Chart.

Issue date	Song	Artist
January 1	"Penso positivo"	Jovanotti
January 8	"Penso positivo"	Jovanotti
January 15	"Penso positivo"	Jovanotti
January 22	"Penso positivo"	Jovanotti
January 29	"All for Love"	Bryan Adams & Sting & Rod Stewart
February 5	"The Rhythm of the Night"	Corona
February 12	"The Rhythm of the Night"	Corona
February 19	"The Rhythm of the Night"	Corona
February 26	"The Rhythm of the Night"	Corona
March 5	"The Rhythm of the Night"	Corona
March 12	"The Rhythm of the Night"	Corona
March 19	"The Rhythm of the Night"	Corona
March 26	"The Rhythm of the Night"	Corona
April 2	"Serenata rap"	Jovanotti
April 9	"Serenata rap"	Jovanotti
April 16	"Serenata rap"	Jovanotti
April 23	"Streets of Philadelphia"	Bruce Springsteen
April 30	"Streets of Philadelphia"	Bruce Springsteen
May 7	"I'll Remember"	Madonna
May 14	"Streets of Philadelphia"	Bruce Springsteen
May 21	"Eins, Zwei, Polizei"	Mo-Do
May 28	"Eins, Zwei, Polizei"	Mo-Do
June 4	"Change"	Molella
June 11	"Change"	Molella
June 18	"Il cielo"	Fiorello & Caterina
June 25	"Il cielo"	Fiorello & Caterina
July 2	"Sweet Dreams"	La Bouche
July 9	"Sweet Dreams"	La Bouche
July 16	"Sweet Dreams"	La Bouche
July 23	"Sweet Dreams"	La Bouche
July 30	"Il cielo"	Fiorello & Caterina
August 6	"The Rhythm Is Magic"	Marie-Claire D'Ubaldo
August 13	"The Rhythm Is Magic"	Marie-Claire D'Ubaldo
August 20	"The Rhythm Is Magic"	Marie-Claire D'Ubaldo
August 27	"The Rhythm Is Magic"	Marie-Claire D'Ubaldo
September 3	"7 Seconds"	Youssou N'Dour & Neneh Cherry
September 10	"7 Seconds"	Youssou N'Dour & Neneh Cherry
September 17	"7 Seconds"	Youssou N'Dour & Neneh Cherry
September 24	"7 Seconds"	Youssou N'Dour & Neneh Cherry
October 1	"7 Seconds"	Youssou N'Dour & Neneh Cherry
October 8	"7 Seconds"	Youssou N'Dour & Neneh Cherry
October 15	"7 Seconds"	Youssou N'Dour & Neneh Cherry
October 22	"7 Seconds"	Youssou N'Dour & Neneh Cherry
October 29	"7 Seconds"	Youssou N'Dour & Neneh Cherry
November 5	"Saturday Night"	Whigfield
November 12	"Short Dick Man"	20 Fingers
November 19	"The Mountain of King"	Digital Boy & Asia
November 26	"The Mountain of King"	Digital Boy & Asia
December 3	"The Mountain of King"	Digital Boy & Asia
December 10	"It's a Rainy Day"	Ice MC
December 17	"Stay With Me"	Da Blitz
December 24	"Strange Love"	Kina
December 31	"Strange Love"	Kina
