= Conjure One (album) =

2002 studio album by Conjure One

Studio album by Conjure One
- Released: September 17, 2002
- Recorded: 1997–2001
- Studios: Warehouse Studios, Vancouver · Armoury Studios, Vancouver · Poe's house, Los Angeles · Stanford Street Studios, Santa Monica · Capitol Studios, Los Angeles · The Farm, Dublin · Mushroom Studios, Vancouver · Westlake Audio, Los Angeles · Hipposonic Studios, Vancouver · The Computer Hell Cabin, Amsterdam · The Dairy, London
- Genres: Worldbeat, electronica, ambient
- Length: 54:37
- Label: Nettwerk
- Producer: Rhys Fulber

Conjure One chronology
Conjure One (2002)	Extraordinary Ways (2005)

Singles from Conjure One
- 1. "Redemption" Released: 2001; 2. "Sleep" Released: 2002; 3. "Tears from the Moon" Released: 2002; 4. "Center of the Sun" Released: 2003

Professional ratings
Review scores
Source	Rating
AllMusic	4.5/5 stars
Chain D.L.K.	Favorable
Exclaim!	Favorable

Conjure One is the self-titled debut album by Canadian electronic music project Conjure One, headed by Rhys Fulber. It was released on September 17, 2002, through Nettwerk.

== Background ==
Being a long-time collaborator of Canadian musician Bill Leeb in the bands Front Line Assembly and Delerium, Fulber had a worldwide hit with the single "Silence" in 1999 with the latter. According to their own figures, Nettwerk sold 1 million copies of the album Karma from which the single was taken. Backed by the success, Fulber decided to release solo material. "Once you have a big song, people listen to what you have to say," he said to Billboard and expressed satisfaction with the label's backing: "Nettwerk was very supportive and has been very patient with me."

== Production ==
Due to other production and remixing responsibilities it took Fulber three years to finish the album. About his approach to writing the album he said, "I like the concept of pop music. It's more challenging to write songs than to write ambient music."

== Release ==
The song "Center of the Sun" is featured in the 2003 American superhero film X2. The song "Sleep" was sampled by Clams Casino (musician) and used in the A$AP Rocky track "Demons".

== Track listing ==
No.	Title	Writer(s)	Length
1.	"Damascus"	Rhys Fulber, Chemda Khalili	2:02
2.	"Center of the Sun"	Fulber, Poe	5:00
3.	"Tears from the Moon"	Rick Nowels, Billy Steinberg, Kyoko Baertsoen	4:17
4.	"Tidal Pool"	Fulber	6:50
5.	"Manic Star"	Fulber, Steinberg, Marie-Claire D'Ubaldo	5:23
6.	"Redemption"	Fulber, Khalili	6:59
7.	"Years"	Fulber, Chris Elliott	6:21
8.	"Make a Wish"	Fulber, Poe	4:32
9.	"Pandora"	Fulber	5:02
10.	"Sleep"	Steinberg, Nowels, D'Ubaldo	5:00
11.	"Premonition (Reprise)"	Fulber, Elliott	3:02

Canadian single and two CD edition bonus tracks
No.	Title	Length
12.	"Sleep (Serenity Remix)"	5:34
13.	"Premonition"	5:44

Canadian and US two CD edition CD 2 bonus tracks
No.	Title	Length
1.	"Tears from the Moon (Hybrid Twisted on the Terrace Mix)"	9:51
2.	"Redemption (Max Graham Dead Sea Mix)"	11:14
3.	"Sleep (Ian Van Dahl Mix)"	8:06
4.	"Tears from the Moon (Robbie Rivera Mix)"	5:44

European two CD edition CD 2 bonus tracks
No.	Title	Length
1.	"Tears from the Moon (Hybrid Twisted on the Terrace Mix)"	9:51
2.	"Redemption (Max Graham Dead Sea Mix)"	11:14
3.	"Sleep (Ian Van Dahl Mix)"	8:06
4.	"Tears from the Moon (Tiësto in Search of Sunrise Remix)"	8:13
5.	"Sleep (Solarstone Afterhours Mix)"	6:52

== Personnel ==
=== Conjure One ===
- Rhys Fulber – programming, production

=== Additional musicians ===
- Chemda – vocals (1, 4, 6), sampled vocals (7)
- Jamie Muhoberac – additional keyboard (1, 3)
- Poe – vocals (2, 8), recording (2, 8)
- Junkie XL – additional programming (2, 5, 8, 10), additional production (4, 10), mixing (4, 6, 10), additional keyboard (4), recording (8), guitar (8)
- Jeff Martin – acoustic guitar (2, 9), esraj (6), bowed guitar (6), vocals (11)
- Sinéad O'Connor – vocals (3)
- Rick Nowels – keyboard (3), chamberlin (3), acoustic guitar (3), electric guitar (3), production (3)
- Ralph Morrison – violin (3)
- Carmen Rizzo – mixing (1, 5, 7–9), additional programming (3, 5, 7, 9), digital editing
- Tim Pierce – additional guitar (3)
- Curt Bisquera – additional percussion (3)
- Ashwin Sood – live drums (4–6), live percussion (4, 6, 9)
- Marie-Claire D'Ubaldo – vocals (5, 10)
- Chris Elliott – string arrangement (5, 7, 9–11), grand piano (5, 8–11), piano (7), conducting
- Joanna Stevens – additional vocals (5, 11)
- Mel Garside – additional vocals (9)
- Sean Ashby – steel guitar (10)
- Vancouver Symphony Orchestra – strings performance

=== Technical personnel ===
- Mike Plotnikoff – recording (1, 2, 4–6, 8–11), mixing (11)
- Greg Reely – mixing (2)
- Brian Reeves – mixing (3)
- Randy Wine – recording (3)
- Chris Garcia – recording (3)
- Blair Calibaba – recording (4–6, 8, 9)
- Mike Landolt – recording (5, 10)
- Graeme Stewart – recording (9)
- Paul Silveira – digital editing
- Greg Collins – digital editing
- Alex Aligizakis – digital editing
- Zack Blackstone – assistant engineering
- Charlie Thiebaud – assistant engineering
- Ted Jensen – mastering
- Olaf Heine – photography
- John Rummen – sleeve design
- Mike Goldwater – front cover photo

== Charts ==
=== Singles ===
==== Sleep ====
Chart (2002)	Peak position
US Dance Club Songs (Billboard)	14

Chart (2003)	Peak position
Belgium (Ultratop 50 Wallonia)	12
UK Singles (Official Charts)	42

==== Tears from the Moon ====
Chart (2003)	Peak position
Netherlands (Single Top 100)	91
US Dance Club Songs (Billboard)	3

==== Center of the Sun ====
Chart (2003)	Peak position
UK Singles (Official Charts)	83
US Dance Club Songs (Billboard)	3
