= Hello (Poe song) =

Single by Poe

from the album Hello
- Released: October 1996
- Genre: Trip hop; pop rock
- Label: Modern
- Songwriter(s): Poe, Ronald L Estill
- Producer(s): RJ Rice; Poe (co-producer)

Poe singles chronology
"Angry Johnny" (1995)	"Hello" (1996)	"Trigger Happy Jack (Drive By a Go-Go)" (1996)

"Hello" is the second single released by singer-songwriter Poe. When first released, the single was a moderate success but fared much better on the charts when a remix of the song was introduced. The music video, which featured a The Cabinet of Doctor Caligari theme was co-directed by her brother, Mark Z. Danielewski.

== Track listing ==
=== Original release ===
1. "Hello" (Band Version) 4:13
2. "Hello" (Radio Edit) 4:00
3. "Hello" (Album Version) 4:30

=== Remix release ===
1. "Hello" (E-Smoove Funk Mix) 6:24
2. "Hello" (Modern Mix) 5:17
3. "Hello" (Generator Mix) 8:54
4. "Hello" (Generator Beat Down) 5:39
5. "Hello" (Edge Factor Mix) 7:58
6. "Hello" (Edge Factor Dub) 7:45
7. "Hello" (Nevins' Electronica Mix) 5:13
8. "Hello" (Tribal Dub) 8:46

== Charts ==
Chart (1996)	Peak position
U.S. Modern Rock Tracks	13
U.S. Hot Dance Club Play	1

== See also ==
- List of number-one dance singles of 1997 (U.S.)
