= Kuruption! =

Studio album by Kurupt
- Released: October 6, 1998
- Recorded: July 1997–July 1998
- Genres: West Coast hip hop; East Coast hip hop
- Length: 123:50
- Labels: Antra; A&M
- Producers: Kurupt (also exec.); Dr. Dre; Daz Dillinger; DeVante Swing; Warren G; Battlecat; Soopafly; Studio Ton; Twin; Dave Hall; D-Moet; Easy Mo Bee; Med; RJ Rice; Stevie J; Storm

Kurupt chronology
Kuruption! (1998)	Tha Streetz Iz a Mutha (1999)

Singles from Kuruption!
- 1. "We Can Freak It" Released: August 1998; 2. "Ask Yourself a Question" Released: 1998

Kuruption! is the debut studio album by American rapper Kurupt. It was released on Antra Records, a label formed after Kurupt left Death Row Records. It was released as a double album and distributed by A&M Records. Originally scheduled for release on September 1, 1998, with the album cover even announcing that date, the album was pushed back to October 6, 1998.

== Production ==
Kurupt was the executive producer of the album. It features guest appearances from numerous rappers from both the East Coast and West Coast, including Daz Dillinger, Noreaga, Tray Deee, Roscoe, and Dr. Dre. Disc one is labeled as "West Coast" and disc two is labeled as "East Coast".

== Critical reception ==
Professional ratings
Review scores
Source	Rating
AllMusic	2.5/5 stars
The Indianapolis Star	2/4 stars
Los Angeles Times	2.5/4 stars
Rolling Stone	3.5/5 stars
The Source	3.5/5 stars
USA Today	2.5/4 stars
Vibe	(critical)

The Indianapolis Star noted that "the 'West Coast' disc is airy, sometimes sunny, with crews riding through California streets in search of women and cash." Rolling Stone concluded that "Kurupt's urgent flow, derived from his idol Rakim, unifies the two discs, but Kuruption, like virtually all two-CD sets, could easily have been pared down to one."

== Commercial performance ==
It peaked at No. 8 on the Billboard 200 on October 24, 1998, and sold 82,000 copies in its first week.

== Track listing ==
Disc One: West Coast
No.	Title	Producer(s)	Length
1.	"This One's for U"	Studio Ton	5:02
2.	"Make Some Noize" (featuring Daz Dillinger)	Soopafly	5:14
3.	"Put That on Something" (featuring Freeze)	DeVante Swing	5:18
4.	"Play My Cards" (featuring Blaqthoven)	DJ Battlecat	4:30
5.	"We Can Freak It" (featuring Baby S and Andre Wilson)	DJ Battlecat	4:10
6.	"Fresh" (featuring Daz Dillinger)	Daz Dillinger	5:01
7.	"C-Walk" (featuring Tray Deee and Slip Capone)	Daz Dillinger	5:12
8.	"Ho's a Housewife" (featuring Fuss and Paul)	Kurupt	5:20
9.	"Can't Let That Slide" (featuring Roscoe)	Twin	6:48
10.	"That's Gangsta"	Warren G	3:30
11.	"Another Day" (featuring Gonzoe and Slip Capone)	DJ Battlecat	4:48
12.	"Ask Yourself a Question" (featuring Dr. Dre)	Dr. Dre	4:47
Total length:			59:40

Disc Two: East Coast
No.	Title	Producer(s)	Length
1.	"It's a Set Up"	D-Moet	7:40
2.	"Light Shit Up" (featuring Buckshot)	Easy Mo Bee	4:46
3.	"Game"	D-Moet	6:07
4.	"Gimmewhutchagot" (featuring Barshawn)	Med	6:15
5.	"If You See Me" (featuring Mr. Short Khop, Baby S, El-Drex and Trigga)	Storm	6:16
6.	"The Life" (featuring El-Drex)	D-Moet	5:36
7.	"No Feelings" (featuring Slop and Patacico)	D-Moet	4:39
8.	"It's Time" (featuring Deadly Venoms)	Storm	5:27
9.	"I Wanna..." (featuring Ralki Royale, Snake, Floyd and Drea)	DeVante Swing	8:38
10.	"Who Do U Be" (featuring Shelene)	RJ Rice; Dave "Jam" Hall	3:35
11.	"We Can Freak It" (East Coast Remix) (featuring Noreaga and Stevie J)	Stevie J	5:11
Total length:			64:10

== Charts ==
=== Weekly charts ===
Chart (1998)	Peak position
US Billboard 200	8
US Top R&B/Hip-Hop Albums (Billboard)	4

=== Year-end charts ===
Chart (1998)	Position
US Top R&B/Hip-Hop Albums (Billboard)	98
