= KATG =

KATG may refer to:

- KATG (FM), a radio station (88.1 FM) licensed Elkhart, Texas, United States
- Keith and The Girl, comedy podcast
- Kool & the Gang, American band
