= Chillout 04/The Ultimate Chillout =

Compilation album by various artists
- Released: September 30, 2003
- Length: 74:44
- Label: Nettwerk

The Ultimate Chillout chronology
Chillout 2003/The Ultimate Chillout (2003)	Chillout 04/The Ultimate Chillout (2003)	Chillout 05/The Ultimate Chillout (2004)

Chillout 04/The Ultimate Chillout is a compilation album released by Nettwerk. It is the fourth from The Ultimate Chillout franchise.

Professional ratings
Review scores
Source	Rating
AllMusic	2.5/5 stars

== Track listing ==
Adapted from AllMusic and the album's official liner notes.

No.	Title	Writer(s)	Performer	Length
1.	"As the Rush Comes" (Gabriel & Dresden Chillout Mix)	Motorcycle Boy	Motorcycle Boy	6:21
2.	"Everything in Its Right Place"	Colin Greenwood; Jonny Greenwood; Ed O'Brien; Phil Selway; Thom Yorke	Radiohead	4:04
3.	"The Great Escape" (Carmen Rizzo Mix)	BT; Caroline Lavelle	BT	5:18
4.	"Butterfly Caught" (Paul Daley Mix)	Neil Davidge; Robert "3D" del Naha	Massive Attack	5:49
5.	"Rabbit in Your Headlights" (3D Mix/Reverse Light)	DJ Shadow; Thom Yorke	Unkle	7:26
6.	"Provider" (Zero 7 Mix)	Chad Hugo; Pharrell Williams	N.E.R.D	7:23
7.	"Magic" (featuring Julee Cruise)		Delerium	4:33
8.	"One Too Many Mornings"	Tom Rowlands; Ed Simons	The Chemical Brothers	4:08
9.	"Center of the Sun" (Solarstone's Chilled Out Remix)	Rhys Fulber	Conjure One	6:09
10.	"Snow Patrol" (Pt. 2)		Alpinestars	5:26
11.	"At the End" (Sat & Lee Howler Reprise)	Melanie Moser	iiO	3:45
12.	"Misti Blu"		Amillionsons	3:40
13.	"Weak Become Heros" (Röyksopp's Memory Lane Mix)		The Streets	6:54
14.	"It's in Our Hands" (Arcade Mix)	Björk	Björk	3:48
Total length:				74:44

== Charts ==
Chart (2003)	Peak position
US Top Dance/Electronic Albums (Billboard)	21
