= Extraordinary Ways =

Studio album by Conjure One
- Released: August 30, 2005
- Recorded: 2005
- Genre: Electronica
- Length: 54:13
- Label: Nettwerk
- Producer: Rhys Fulber

Conjure One chronology
Conjure One (2002)	Extraordinary Ways (2005)	Exilarch (2010)

Singles from Extraordinary Ways
- 1. "Extraordinary Way" Released: August 30, 2005; 2. "Face the Music" Released: 2006

Professional ratings
Review scores
Source	Rating
AllMusic	3.5/5 stars
Exclaim!	(moderate)
Hybrid	(favourable)
PopMatters	5/10
SLUG	(favourable)

Extraordinary Ways is an album by Canadian electronic music project Conjure One. Released in August 2005, it was the second album for the project headed by Rhys Fulber.

== Release and promotion ==
The album has been released with the Copy Control protection system in some regions.

ACIDplanet.com released the complete multitracks to "Face the Music" in a remix competition that ran from December 2005 through January 2006. The winning remix by Erick Muise received inclusion on the promo release of the "Face the Music" single.

== Track listing ==
All music is composed by Rhys Fulber except where noted.

No.	Title	Lyrics	Length
1.	"Endless Dream"	Poe	4:30
2.	"Face the Music"	Peter Wright, Tiff Lacey	4:35
3.	"Pilgrimage"		6:48
4.	"One Word"	Poe	4:40
5.	"I Believe" (Buzzcocks cover, music by Pete Shelley)	Shelley	6:07
6.	"Beyond Being"		7:07
7.	"Extraordinary Way" (music by Chris Elliott, Fulber)	Poe	4:40
8.	"Dying Light" (music by Fulber, Joanna Stevens)		6:45
9.	"Forever Lost"	Nick Holmes	4:46
10.	"Into the Escape"		4:15

== Personnel ==
=== Conjure One ===
- Rhys Fulber – programming, vocals (5, 6), production

=== Additional musicians ===
- Poe – vocals (1, 4, 7)
- Tiff Lacey – vocals (2)
- Joanna Stevens – vocals (3, 8)
- Leah Randi – vocals (6)
- Chemda – vocals (9, 10)

== Charts ==
=== Album ===
Chart (2005)	Peak position
US Top Dance Albums (Billboard)	18

=== Singles ===
==== Extraordinay Way ====
Chart (2005)	Peak position
US Dance Club Songs (Billboard)	4

==== Face the Music ====
Chart (2006)	Peak position
US Dance Club Songs (Billboard)	2
