= Angry Johnny =

Single by Poe

from the album Hello
- Released: 1996
- Genre: Alternative rock; trip hop
- Length: 4:18
- Label: Modern
- Songwriters: Poe, Ralph James Rice, Felix Cavaliere
- Producer: RJ Rice

Poe singles chronology
"Angry Johnny" (1996)	"Hello" (1996)

"Angry Johnny" is the debut single by Poe, released in 1996 from her debut album Hello. The song received heavy radio airplay, and an accompanying music video was shown frequently on MTV.

== Background ==
Despite its success and positive critical reviews, "Angry Johnny" was the only commercial single released in Australia; however, a variety of promotional singles were released across the world. "Angry Johnny" was also included on the 1996 album Big Shiny Tunes.

== Composition ==
"Angry Johnny" has a slow rhythm and, like much of Hello, incorporates layered vocal tracks. The single was produced by Matt Sorum.

A "Full Band Version" of the song was also released, which was more acoustic than the album version and heavily featured cello.

== Critical reception ==
Billboard praised the single, particularly the "fun and clever sexual euphemisms" of the lyrics.

== Chart performance ==
"Angry Johnny" peaked at #7 on the Billboard Modern Rock Tracks chart.

== In popular culture ==
A two-second clip of "Angry Johnny" was included in the endpapers of the US hardcover version of Mark Z. Danielewski's novel House of Leaves, in the form of hexadecimal numbers that, when compiled in a hex editor, could be turned into an AIFF audio file.

== Australian CD single track listing ==
Length: 12 min 51 sec

Track	Title	Length
01	Angry Johnny	04:16
02	Dolphin	03:55
03	Angry Johnny (Band Version)

=== Personnel ===
1. Lyrics: Poe. Production: RJ Rice.
2. Lyrics: Poe. Production: RJ Rice & Poe (co-producer).

== Charts ==
Chart (1995–1996)	Peak position
US Billboard Modern Rock Tracks	7
