= Trigger Happy Jack (Drive By a Go-Go) =

"Trigger Happy Jack (Drive by a Go-Go)"

Single by Poe

from the album Hello
- Released: September 1995
- Genre: Alternative rock; trip hop
- Label: Modern
- Songwriter(s): Poe, Jeffrey Connor
- Producer(s): Dave Jerden; Poe (co-producer); Jeffrey Connor (co-producer)

Poe singles chronology
"Hello" (1996)	"Trigger Happy Jack (Drive by a Go-Go)" (1995)	"Today" (1998)

"Trigger Happy Jack" is a single from the debut album of Poe. The single peaked at 17 on the alternative charts and earned a gold record. It was serviced to radio in September 1995. It peaked at 27 on the Billboard Modern Rock Tracks chart The video was quite popular featuring Matt Sorum from Guns N' Roses on drums, co-writer Jeffrey Connor on bass and featured Poe harassing a small man that she keeps in a jar.

== Tracks ==
1. Psycho Demolition Mix 7:50
2. Only Poe Mix 3:35
3. Drive By Remix 3:46
4. Instrumental 3:47
5. Original Album Version 3:35
6. Padre Fear 3:25
7. Acoustic Version 3:40
8. Radio Edit 3:47
