= Holoscenic =

Studio album by Conjure One
- Released: November 20, 2015
- Recorded: Surplus Sound, Los Angeles
- Genre: Electronica, chill out, downtempo
- Length: 68:00
- Label: Armada
- Producer: Rhys Fulber

Conjure One chronology
Exilarch (2010)	Holoscenic (2015)

Singles from Holoscenic
- 1. "Under the Gun" Released: March 25, 2013; 2. "Still Holding On" Released: September 2013; 3. "Ghost" Released: November 2016

Professional ratings
Review scores
Source	Rating
Release	8/10
The Spill Magazine	8/10

Holoscenic is the fourth studio album released by Canadian producer Rhys Fulber as Conjure One, the first album for Armada Music. The album was initially released as a worldwide digital download on November 20, 2015.

== Overview ==
Two singles were separately released, four months apart from each other, prior to the launch of the album. First out in April 2013 was the song "Under the Gun" featuring vocals by Leigh Nash, which also featured a remix by Rank 1 and the first music video for Conjure One, shot in Iowa and Tennessee. The second single, "Still Holding On" (released in September 2013), featured vocals by Aruna and remixes by Arisen Flame, Clinton Van Sciver, Mike Shiver and well as a chillout mix by Aruna and Rhys Fulber.

About the album, Fulber said, "I had been thinking about the concept of the Holocene epoch for a while - the ruins of civilization that a decaying society leaves behind to be once again consumed by nature. The word itself is a bit dry and one day the word play just came together and was written down to be rediscovered a couple years later as this album took shape. It then seemed like the perfect title for this collection of songs, and directly inspired the artwork which perfectly conveys the feeling of the music."

== Track listing ==
No.	Title	Writer(s)	Length
1.	"Kill the Fear""	Rhys Fulber, Peter Wright	06:11
2.	"Miscreant"	Fulber, Chris Elliott	06:00
3.	"Under the Gun"	Fulber, Leigh Nash	05:34
4.	"All That You Leave Behind"	Fulber	08:17
5.	"Only Sky"	Fulber, Victoria Horn, Christian Burns	05:24
6.	"Serac"	Fulber	05:59
7.	"Still Holding On"	Fulber, Aruna	06:15
8.	"Ghost"	Fulber, Kerli, Horn	05:23
9.	"The Garden"	Fulber	06:19
10.	"Brave for Me"	Fulber, Jessica Bennett	06:36
11.	"Oceanic"	Fulber, Mimi Page	05:10

== Personnel ==
=== Conjure One ===
- Rhys Fulber – production, mixing, programming

=== Additional musicians ===
- Hannah Ray – vocals (1)
- Deniz Reno – vocals (2)
- Chris Elliott – string arrangement (2)
- Leigh Nash – vocals (3)
- Emerson Swinford – guitar (3)
- Stevie Blacke – strings (3, 7), string arrangement (3, 7)
- Leah Randi – vocals (4)
- Christian Burns – vocals (5)
- Matt Lange – guitar (5, 10, 11), additional programming (1, 8, 11)
- Aruna – vocals (7)
- Kristy Thirsk – vocals (8)
- Joel Shearer – guitar (8)
- Kerli – backing vocals (8)
- Jeza – vocals (10)
- Mimi Page – vocals (11)

=== Technical personnel ===
- Greg Reely – mastering, mixing (1, 3, 8)
- Michał Karcz – cover art, design
- John Rummen – Conjure One logo

== Charts ==
Chart (2015)	Peak position
US Top Dance/Electronic Albums (Billboard)	14
