= List of number-one singles of 1996 (Spain) =

This is a list of Spanish PROMUSICAE Top 20 Singles number-ones of 1996.

Issue date	Song	Artist
1 January	"Die reise"	Fraktal 2
8 January	"Ex-p-cial"	EX-3
15 January	"Jesus to a Child"	George Michael
22 January	"Jesus to a Child"	George Michael
29 January	"Jesus to a Child"	George Michael
5 February	"Jesus to a Child"	George Michael
12 February	"Jesus to a Child"	George Michael
19 February	"Children"	Robert Miles
26 February	"Children"	Robert Miles
4 March	"Falling into You"	Céline Dion
11 March	"Children"	Robert Miles
18 March	"Jesus to a Child"	George Michael
25 March	"How Deep Is Your Love"	Take That
1 April	"Jesus to a Child"	George Michael
8 April	"La cosa mas bella"	Eros Ramazzotti
15 April	"La cosa mas bella"	Eros Ramazzotti
22 April	"Fastlove"	George Michael
29 April	"Fastlove"	George Michael
6 May	"Fastlove"	George Michael
13 May	"Fastlove"	George Michael
20 May	"Danza de los limones"	Juan Antonio canta
27 May	"Danza de los limones"	Juan Antonio canta
3 June	"Danza de los limones"	Juan Antonio canta
10 June	"Danza de los limones"	Juan Antonio canta
17 June	"Danza de los limones"	Juan Antonio canta
24 June	"Mueve, mueve"	Sandy & Papo
1 July	"Seven Days and One Week"	B.B.E.
8 July	"Forever Love"	Gary Barlow
15 July	"Forever Love"	Gary Barlow
22 July	"Forever Love"	Gary Barlow
29 July	"Freedom"	Robbie Williams
5 August	"Freedom"	Robbie Williams
12 August	"Freedom"	Robbie Williams
19 August	"Spinning the Wheel"	George Michael
26 August	"Spinning the Wheel"	George Michael
2 September	"Spinning the Wheel"	George Michael
9 September	"A comer a casa"	Los DelTonos
16 September	"A comer a casa"	Los DelTonos
23 September	"Stranger in Moscow"	Michael Jackson
30 September	"Stranger in Moscow"	Michael Jackson
7 October	"Stranger in Moscow"	Michael Jackson
14 October	"Stranger in Moscow"	Michael Jackson
21 October	"Stranger in Moscow"	Michael Jackson
28 October	"Zero"	The Smashing Pumpkins
4 November	"Zero"	The Smashing Pumpkins
11 November	"Zero"	The Smashing Pumpkins
18 November	"Child"	Mark Owen
25 November	"Child"	Mark Owen
2 December	"Child"	Mark Owen
9 December	"Macarena Christmas"	Los del Rio
16 December	"Macarena Christmas"	Los del Rio
23 December	"Child"	Mark Owen
30 December	"Child"	Mark Owen

== Records for the Year ==
- Longest running number-one of the year - George Michael "Jesus to a Child" (7 non-consecutive weeks)
- Artists with most number ones - George Michael (3)

== See also ==
- 1996 in music
- List of number-one hits (Spain)
