= Haunted (Poe album) =

Studio album by Poe
- Released: October 31, 2000
- Recorded: 1998–2000
- Studios: Extasy North (Los Angeles); Cello (Hollywood)
- Genres: Alternative rock; trip hop; electronica; pop rock; experimental rock
- Length: 68:47
- Labels: Atlantic; FEI
- Producers: Poe; Olle Romo; Matt Wilder; Matt Wallace; Mike Urban

Poe chronology
Hello (1995)	Haunted (2000)

Singles from Haunted
- 1. "Control" Released: 1998; 2. "Walk the Walk" Released: 2000; 3. " Hey Pretty" Released: 2001

Haunted is the second studio album by American singer-songwriter Poe, released in 2000 after a five-year hiatus from her debut album Hello in 1995. The self-produced album was created as a tribute to her father, and counterpart to her brother Mark Z. Danielewski's novel House of Leaves.

In April 2019, eOne Music released Haunted on vinyl for the first time as an exclusive through Books-A-Million.

== Overview ==
The album features samples of audio cassettes made by Poe's father, film director Tad Danielewski. The cassettes, containing audio from Tad to Poe and her brother Mark from as far back as their births, were found by Poe and Mark after their father died. Thus, the album is usually interpreted as a real woman (Poe) singing tributes to her deceased father (who sings back) while telling the story of a group of fictional characters (from House of Leaves).

== History ==
Haunted found Poe combining traditional pop notions with electronic, dance and hard rock music. The album was a critical success. The song "Hey Pretty" was released as a promotional single, but Poe's vocals had been replaced with a chapter reading from her brother. It reached No. 13 on Billboard's US Modern Rock chart. "Wild" was planned as a third single, garnering some radio play in the Chicago area after a promotional edit was released. The single was never released commercially but featured a shorter radio mix in addition to an acoustic/rock version of the song.

== Reception ==
Professional ratings
Aggregate scores
Source	Rating
Metacritic	76/100
Review scores
Source	Rating
AllMusic	4/5 stars
The Encyclopedia of Popular Music	4/5 stars
Entertainment Weekly	B
Los Angeles Times	3/4 stars
Maxim	3/5 stars
NME	6/10
Orange County Register	A−
Q	3/5 stars
Rolling Stone	2/5 stars
Wall of Sound	85/100

Haunted received generally positive reviews. On Metacritic, the album has a score of 76 out of 100, indicating "generally favorable reviews".

MacKenzie Wilson of AllMusic gave the album a positive review, writing "Haunted is in its own class of twisted intelligence and beauty." In another positive review, PopMatters's Eden Miller wrote "Few musicians are on the same level as Poe in terms of her bravery exposing and expressing her own personal fears. While it's a bit obvious to say it, Haunted will haunt you." In another positive review, Jason Mandell of LA Weekly wrote "Those without patience for such abstractions (brief though they may be) may find Haunted tiresome. The rest of us can rejoice in its originality and thank our lucky stars that Poe had the confidence and imagination to make it."

In a mixed review, Rolling Stone's Neva Chonin wrote "Unfortunately, Haunted reverberates with tired samples, rehashed echo effects and beats so plodding they could stop a metronome." Q also gave the album a mixed review, writing "The mood is too heavy for far too long, but some good songs and more cohesive, melodic structures augur well for this damaged daughter's future."

== Track listing ==
No.	Title	Writer(s)	Length
1.	"Exploration B"	Poe	1:10
2.	"Haunted"	Mike Elizondo, John O'Brien, Poe	5:20
3.	"Control"	Daris Adkins, Poe, Toby Skard	6:03
4.	"Terrible Thought"	Elizondo, O'Brien, Poe	4:41
5.	"Walk the Walk"	O'Brien, Poe	4:50
6.	"Terrified Heart"	Poe	0:52
7.	"Wild"	Elizondo, O'Brien, Poe	9:00
8.	"5&1/2 Minute Hallway"	Josh Clayton-Felt, Poe	3:33
9.	"Not a Virgin"	Elizondo, Poe, Matt Wilder	3:42
10.	"Hey Pretty"	Kenneth Burgomaster, Poe	3:45
11.	"Dear Johnny"	Poe	0:50
12.	"Could've Gone Mad"	Adkins, Poe	5:21
13.	"Lemon Meringue"	O'Brien, Poe, Wilder	3:22
14.	"Spanish Doll"	Adkins, Poe	4:52
15.	"House of Leaves"	Poe	1:48
16.	"Amazed"	O'Brien, Poe	6:23
17.	"If You Were Here"	Heitor Pereira	3:15
Total length:			68:47

Haunted – 2001 reissue (bonus track)
No.	Title	Writer(s)	Length
18.	"Hey Pretty (Drive-By 2001 Mix)"	Kenneth Burgomaster, Mark Z. Danielewski, Poe	3:47
Total length:			72:34

== Personnel ==
- Poe – vocals
- Daris Adkins – guitar
- Charlie Bisharat – violin
- Kenneth Burgomaster – keyboards
- David Campbell – viola
- Larry Corbett – cello
- Mark Z. Danielewski – vocals
- Mike Elizondo – bass guitar
- Brandon Fields – saxophone
- Josh Freese – drums
- Gary Grant – trumpet
- Jerry Hey – trumpet
- Trevor Lawrence Jr. – drums
- Priscilla Loeb – vocals
- Jamie Muhoberac – keyboards
- John O'Brien – fiddle
- Melissa Rogers – vocals
- Samantha Rogers – vocals
- Madison Rubeli – vocals
- Bill Reichenbach – trombone
- Michael Urbano – drums
- Joey Waronker – drums

== Production ==
- Producers: Poe, Olle Romo, Matt Wilder, Matt Wallace, Mike Urban
- Engineers: Kirk Fyvie, Phil Kaffel, Chad Bamford, Danger Jay
- Mixing: Paul Leary, Olle Romo, David Thoener, Danger Jay
- Programming: Poe, John O'Brien, Olle Romo, Danger Jay
- Arranger: David Campbell

== Charts ==
Album – Billboard (US)

Year	Chart	Peak position
2000	The Billboard 200	115

Singles – Billboard (US)

Year	Single	Chart	Peak position
2001	"Hey Pretty"	Adult Top 40	30
2001	"Hey Pretty"	Modern Rock Tracks	13

== In other media ==
An early version of the song "Control" was featured in the 1998 PlayStation third-person shooter video game Apocalypse.

The album's title track was used in the ending credits to the film Book of Shadows: Blair Witch 2 (2000).

Haunted was also referred to in the 2002 film Panic Room. In a conversation between Meg Altman, (played by Jodie Foster) and a real estate agent, she asks, "Ever read any Poe?", to which the response is, "No, but I loved her last album!".

The song "Haunted" was also featured at the end of the second episode of the video game Alan Wake (2010).
