= I'll Remember =

1994 single by Madonna

Single by Madonna

from the album With Honors: Music from the Motion Picture
- B-side: "Secret Garden"
- Released: March 8, 1994
- Genre: Pop; downtempo
- Length: 4:23
- Label: Maverick; Sire; Warner Bros.
- Songwriters: Madonna; Patrick Leonard; Richard Page
- Producers: Madonna; Patrick Leonard

Madonna singles chronology
"Bye Bye Baby" (1993)	"I'll Remember" (1994)	"Secret" (1994)

Music video
- "I'll Remember" on YouTube

"I'll Remember" is a song by American singer Madonna for the 1994 film With Honors. It was released by Maverick and Warner Bros. Records on March 8, 1994, as the lead single from the film's soundtrack album. It was a radical change in image and style for Madonna, who had received huge backlash due to the release of her book Sex, the studio album Erotica and the film Body of Evidence. Warner Bros. decided to release the song for the film after noting most of her previous soundtrack singles had achieved commercial success. It utilizes a synthesized keyboard arrangement to bring about a continuously reverberating heartbeat sound. Madonna's voice is supported by backing vocals.

Music critics praised the song, hailing it as one of her best works. It was nominated for Best Song Written Specifically for a Motion Picture or for Television at the 37th Grammy Awards and Best Original Song at the 52nd Golden Globe Awards. "I'll Remember" was also a commercial success, peaking at number two on the Billboard Hot 100 and becoming her fourth number-one hit on the Adult Contemporary chart. It also topped the singles charts in Canada and Italy. The music video of "I'll Remember", directed by Alek Keshishian, portrayed Madonna singing the song in a stylized recording studio. Her look and style were compared to the imagery of the music video of previous single "Rain". "I'll Remember" did not appear on any Madonna studio album, but was later included in the ballads collection Something to Remember (1995).

== Background ==
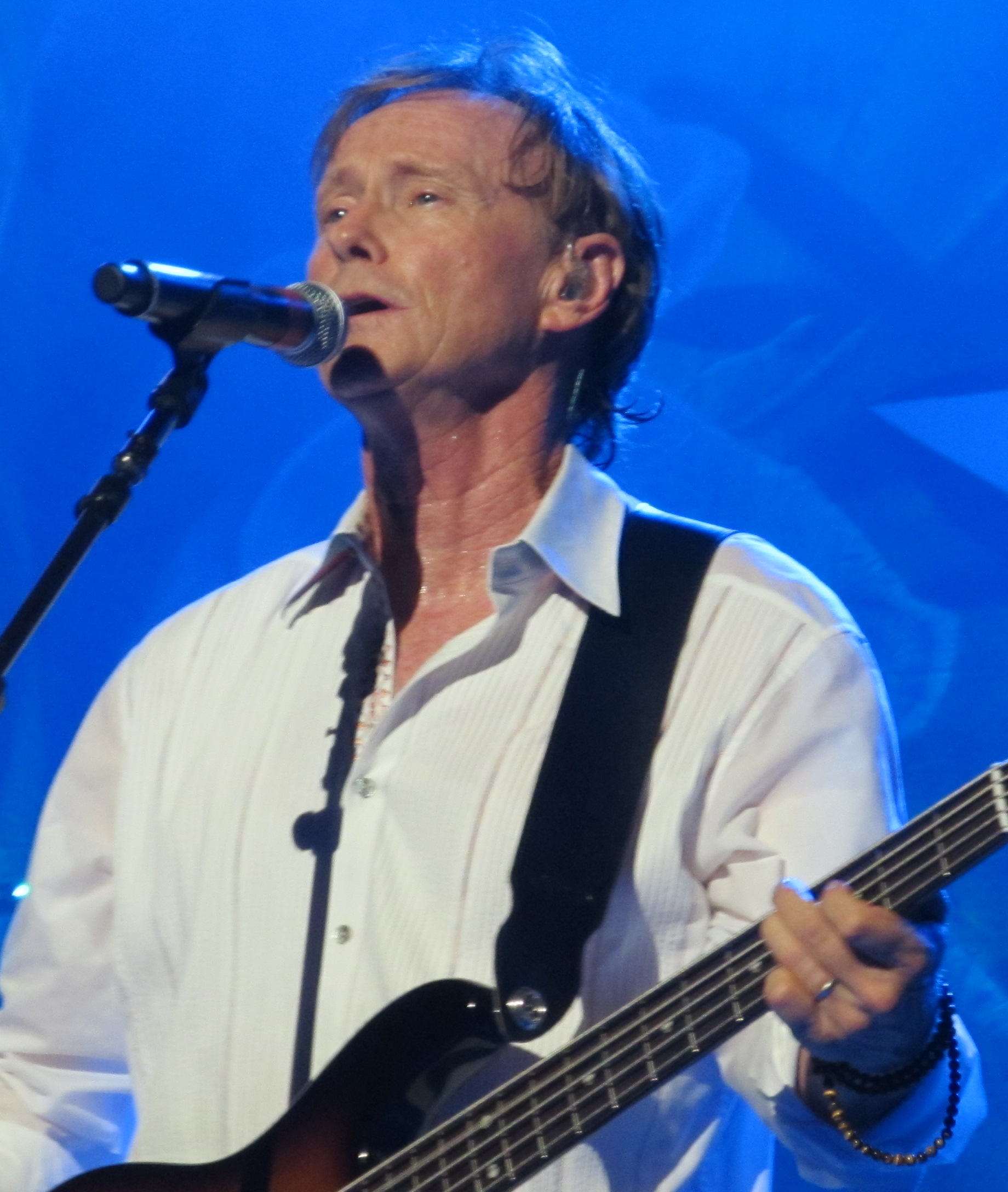
Richard Page co-wrote the song.

The year 1992 saw the release of the book Sex by Madonna. However, the book, which contained explicit sexual imagery and pictures of voyeuristic fantasies, was negatively accepted by the critics as well as some of her fans. Madonna's fifth studio album Erotica and the film Body of Evidence were released at the same time; both failed to garner critical and commercial acclaim. Hence she decided to re-invent her image, to connect with her fans and repair the damage that her provocative image had caused to her career. "I'll Remember" was one of the songs that was developed for this purpose. The ballad was initially a collaboration between musician Richard Page and Patrick Leonard, before Madonna reworked the track for Alek Keshishian's film With Honors (1994). According to Page, "Madonna was brought in... she changed all my lyrics for the better. She really did a great job."

Produced by Madonna and Leonard, "I'll Remember" was released as the lead single from the soundtrack album of With Honors. Madonna's own label, Maverick, was charged with the task of putting together the soundtrack album. They decided to include "I'll Remember", after noticing that all of her soundtrack releases have been commercially successful.

== Composition ==
"I'll Remember"
A 26 second sample of "I'll Remember". Madonna sings the chorus of the song which is backed by vocals and a steadily reverberating keyboard bringing about the effect of heartbeat.

According to author Rikky Rooksby, the song is written in the style of Album-oriented rock (AOR) by bands like Boston or Foreigner. It is slowed down from the tempo of rock songs and utilizes a steadily reverberating synth keyboard to bring on the effect of a heartbeat. "I'll Remember" has characteristics of late Seventies song apart from the arrangement and the low bass. Madonna sings in a low-key voice which is almost overshadowed by the synth arrangement. Lyrically the song talks about Madonna looking back on a good love affair. According to Alex Balk from The Awl, the lyrics were inspirational, especially the line "I learned to let go of the illusion that we can possess", which is answered by Madonna herself that "I remember, happiness".

The song starts with a C major chord sequence and is used on the flattened seventh key of the sequence. But the actual key of the song is D major. It is set in a time signature of common time with a moderate tempo of 120 beats per minute. Madonna's voice spans from F♯_{3} to G_{4}. A much stronger arrangement of drums are used in the second verse. The chorus uses the chord sequence of D–G–Bm–A while the first two lines of each verse uses the chord progression of C–D–C–D_{7}–C–D–Bm–A. During the intermediate line "I learned to let go of the illusion that we can possess", the structure changes to D/F♯–Bm–G–D–A–G–A. Backing vocals are used on the later choruses for support with the strings, cascading down to a minor arrangement before the third one. The song ends with fading out and devoid of any musical climax.

A number of remixes were issued alongside the regular version. The maxi-single had four different versions, three being those of "I'll Remember" and the fourth being a live version of the Erotica track, "Why's It So Hard", performed on The Girlie Show World Tour. According to Jose F. Promis from AllMusic, "the mixes of [the song] were conjured by William Orbit, giving each version an ethereal, spacey, and very mellow feel". The "Guerilla Beach" mix was different from the original version, making it more adult contemporary oriented, while the "Orbit Remix" remained similar to the actual version.

== Critical response ==
Author Christopher Feldman in his book, Billboard Book of Number 2 Singles, described the song as a "tender ballad." Billboard music editor Timothy White called the song as lilting and one of Madonna's classics in his book Music to My Ears: The Billboard Essays : Portraits of Popular Music in the '90s. He also complimented the song for talking about a dead relationship. Larry Flick stated that it finds Madonna "inside an easy-paced pop chugger that is etched with slightly Caribbean percussion. Subdued synth pulses frame Madonna's pensive performance." Troy J. Augusto from Cash Box named it Pick of the Week, saying that "this tender, down-tempo stroll that will serve to re-introduce the ambitious one to her old friends at top 40 radio—folks who, based on some of her recent, questionable material, might have wondered if the girl’s best work was well behind her. Actually, the sky’s the limit with this smoothly textured, deliberately paced song (produced by Patrick Leonard and Madonna) that will perform well in all hit and adult formats. After a number of stinkers, it’s nice to hear her return to her greatest strength, the moody power ballad."

Author Rikky Rooksby noted the song as one of Madonna's biggest ever singles and a stronger cut. Pan-European magazine Music & Media commented that she "becomes more ambient with every release", adding that this song "further cements this impression." James Hamilton from Music Week's RM Dance Update deemed it a "sweetly warbled quovery slow roller". John Kilgo from The Network Forty said that the song is "compared as a half-beat faster than the earlier Madonna smash, 'Live To Tell', the production grooves while the lyrics are ballad-like." Terry Staunton from NME declared it as "a flat ballad about fond memories of days gone by." Sal Cinquemani from Slant Magazine praised it as a "soundtrack gem". Pete Stanton from Smash Hits gave it three out of five, viewing it as "a slow, uneventful, but quite charming tune." Author J. Randy Taraborrelli in his biography of Madonna called the song a beautiful one. According to him, "it sounds like a flick theme too, equipped with smart chords and big emotion. It is reminiscent of another movie theme of Madonna's, 'Live to Tell' (1986)." Music critique Peter Buckley noted that the song was atmospheric and one of Madonna's best works, showing her ability to stay in touch with and adapt to musical developments.

"I'll Remember" earned nominations for Best Song Written Specifically for a Motion Picture or for Television at the 37th Grammy Awards and Best Original Song at the 52nd Golden Globe Awards. Robbie Daw from Idolator listed it as one of "Madonna’s 10 Best Songs That Radio Forgot", saying that "Madge has lost many friends and lovers over the years, but here she turns lemons into lemonade by cherishing the good times and learning from 'the way that you changed me'." Journalist Matthew Rettenmund listed the "Guerilla Beach" remix of the song at number nine on his list of "The 25 Best Madonna Remixes", describing it as "spacey" and believing it to be "markedly superior to the lovely but unassuming original". In 2014, Graham Greymore from Queerty listed "I'll Remember" as one of the "12 Most Underrated Madonna Songs Of All Time". While ranking Madonna's singles, in honor of her 60th birthday, The Guardian's Jude Rogers placed "I'll Remember" at number 42, praising its "atmospheric" verses.

== Chart performance ==
In the United States, the song debuted at number 35 on the Hot 100 chart for the Billboard issue dated April 2, 1994, and it sold 12,000 units in the first week. After eight weeks, the song reached a peak of number two on the chart on May 28, 1994 behind "I Swear" by All-4-One. It stayed there for four weeks. The song became the fifth single by Madonna to peak at the number two position and tied her with Elvis Presley for the most number two songs on the Hot 100. However, this record was broken by Madonna in 1998, when her single "Frozen" peaked at two. The song topped the Adult Contemporary chart for four consecutive weeks, becoming Madonna's fourth number-one for this chart following "Live to Tell", "La Isla Bonita", and "Cherish". The single spent a total of 26 weeks on the Billboard Hot 100 and was certified gold by the Recording Industry Association of America (RIAA) on June 14, 1994. It was one of the best-selling singles of 1994, having sold 500,000 copies within that year.

In Canada, the song debuted at 52 on the RPM 100 Hit Tracks chart. After seven weeks it reached the top of the chart for the RPM issue dated May 16, 1994. The song was present on the chart for 24 weeks, and was ranked at number two on the year-end RPM chart for 1994. In the United Kingdom it debuted at ten on the chart and reached seven the next week. It was present for a total of eight weeks on the chart. According to the Official Charts Company, "I'll Remember" has sold 100,090 copies in the United Kingdom, as of August 2008. Across Europe, the song became a top 40 hit in Belgium, France and Netherlands. The song reached the top-twenty in Iceland and Switzerland, and the top-ten in Australia, Ireland and Sweden. It peaked just outside the top 40 in Germany.

== Music video ==
Madonna sporting black, cropped hair and wearing a large necklace, sings the song in a recording studio. Her look in the video was compared with the look in the clip for "Rain".

The accompanying music video for "I'll Remember" was directed by Alek Keshishian, who had previously directed the live performance versions of "Like a Virgin" (1984) and "Holiday" (1983) from the Truth or Dare documentary and also the music video of her single "This Used to Be My Playground" (1992). The video featured production credits by Diane Greenwalt, editing by Patrick Sheffield and photography by Stephen Ramsey. According to Jerry Ryan from creative production team Steele,

"I'll Remember" had multiple projection screen fills and classic theatre atmospherics (like smoke haze and the flickering light beams from a projection booth) added. The theatre walls and ceiling had digital enhancements. A sound booth was completely created from scratch to accompany a crane shot down to Madonna. All the movie inserts were treated to appear to be within the theater and all Madonna's close ups and medium shots were individually treated for facial beauty enhancements.

The video features Madonna in a stylized recording studio singing the song with back up singers. The video was compared to the music video of Madonna's single "Rain" (1993). Her look in the video consists of blue-black icy hair, bright blue eyes and a long dark dress with a beaded necklace around her neck. Madonna's face was mainly shot above her head, with her face looking up just ahead of the camera focus. Sometimes she looks to a video screen behind her which plays the scenes from the film, as if to take inspiration for her singing. Other times she is accompanied by her back-up singers, mainly during the chorus, and sometimes she sings alone.

The music video ends with a shot of Madonna watching herself recording the song. In this last scene she is dressed in a long black coat and holds a cigarette in her hand. Scholars noted that this last shot clearly illustrates the gender paradox of Madonna, because as she watches her female form singing the song, she herself is dressed in an androgynous way, holding a cigarette, which is associated as one of the symbolic forms of male supremacy. Feminist writer Martha Leslie Allen lauded the video, as well as Madonna, "for breaking free of the conventional portrayal of women yet again, and displaying their duality." The video can be found on Madonna's 2009 compilation, Celebration: The Video Collection.

== Track listings and formats ==
- US CD single and 7-inch vinyl; UK cassette single and 7-inch vinyl
1. "I'll Remember (Theme from With Honors)" – 4:19
2. "Secret Garden" – 5:32
- US CD maxi-single
1. "I'll Remember (Theme from With Honors)" – 4:20
2. "I'll Remember (Theme from With Honors)" (Guerilla Beach Mix) – 6:18
3. "Why's It So Hard" (live from the Girlie Show)* – 5:12
4. "I'll Remember (Theme from With Honors)" (Orbit remix) – 4:19
- UK CD single
1. "I'll Remember (Theme from With Honors)" – 4:19
2. "I'll Remember (Theme from With Honors)" (Orbit remix) – 4:19
3. "I'll Remember (Theme from With Honors)" (Guerilla Beach mix) – 6:18
4. "Why's It So Hard" (live from the Girlie Show)* – 5:12
- UK 12-inch single
1. "I'll Remember (Theme from With Honors)" (Guerilla Beach mix) – 6:10
2. "I'll Remember (Theme from With Honors)" (Guerilla Groove mix) – 6:07
3. "I'll Remember (Theme from With Honors)" – 4:22
4. "I'll Remember (Theme from With Honors)" (Orbit alternative remix) – 4:30
- International digital EP (2024)
1. "I'll Remember (Theme from With Honors)" – 4:20
2. "I'll Remember" (Guerilla Beach mix) – 6:18
3. "I'll Remember" (Guerilla Groove mix) – 6:03
4. "Why's It So Hard" (live from the Girlie Show)* – 5:12
5. "I'll Remember" (Orbit remix) – 4:18
6. "I'll Remember" (Orbit alternative remix) – 4:30
- *Recorded live at Sydney Cricket Ground, November 19, 1993

== Credits and personnel ==
Credits are adapted from "I'll Remember" 7-inch vinyl single liner notes.

- Madonna – songwriter, vocals
- Patrick Leonard – songwriter, drums, keyboard, production
- Richard Page – songwriter
- Dean Parks – acoustic guitar
- Jimmy Johnson - fretless bass
- Suzie Katayama – cello

== Charts ==
=== Weekly charts ===
Weekly chart performance for "I'll Remember"
Chart (1994)	Peak position
Australia (ARIA)	7
Belgium (Ultratop 50 Flanders)	32
Canada Top Singles (RPM)	1
Canada Adult Contemporary (RPM)	1
Canada Retail Singles (The Record)	13
Canada Contemporary Hit Radio (The Record)	1
Europe (European Hot 100)	15
Europe (European AC Radio)	4
Europe (European Hit Radio)	3
Finland (Suomen virallinen lista)	5
France (SNEP)	40
Germany (GfK)	49
Iceland (Íslenski Listinn Topp 40)	20
Ireland (IRMA)	10
Israel (Israeli Singles Chart)	5
Italy (Musica e dischi)	1
Netherlands (Dutch Top 40)	34
Netherlands (Single Top 100)	28
New Zealand (Recorded Music NZ)	37
Scottish Singles Sales (Official Charts)	12
Sweden (Sverigetopplistan)	9
Switzerland (Schweizer Hitparade)	17
UK Singles (Official Charts)	7
UK Airplay (Music Week)	7
US Billboard Hot 100	2
US Adult Contemporary (Billboard)	1
US Dance Singles Sales (Billboard)	30
US Pop Airplay (Billboard)	2
US Rhythmic Airplay (Billboard)	14
US Cash Box Top 100	2

=== Weekly charts ===
Weekly chart performance for "I'll Remember"
Chart (2024)	Peak position
UK Singles Download (OCC)	92

=== Year-end charts ===
Year-end chart performance for "I'll Remember"
Chart (1994)	Position
Australia (ARIA)	41
Brazil (Brazilian Radio Airplay)	76
Canada Top Singles (RPM)	2
Canada Adult Contemporary (RPM)	27
Europe (Eurochart Hot 100)	82
Europe (European Hit Radio)	37
Italy (Musica e dischi)	4
Netherlands (Dutch Top 40)	273
Sweden (Topplistan)	66
UK Singles (OCC)	92
US Billboard Hot 100	13
US Adult Contemporary (Billboard)	11
US Cash Box Top 100	17

== Certifications and sales ==
Certifications and sales for "I'll Remember"
Region	Certification	Certified units/sales
Australia (ARIA)	Gold	35,000^{^}
United Kingdom	—	100,090
United States (RIAA)	Gold	500,000
Summaries
Worldwide	—	1,000,000
^{^} Shipments figures based on certification alone.

== Release history ==
Release dates and formats for "I'll Remember"
Region	Date	Format(s)	Label(s)	Ref.
United States	March 8, 1994	7-inch vinyl; 12-inch vinyl; CD; cassette	Maverick; Sire; Warner Bros.	
United Kingdom	March 21, 1994	7-inch vinyl; 12-inch vinyl; CD; cassette	Maverick; Sire; Warner Bros.	
Japan	March 25, 1994	Mini-CD	Maverick; Sire; Warner Bros.	

== See also ==
- List of number-one singles of 1994 (Canada)
- List of number-one hits of 1994 (Italy)
- 1994 (U.S.)

== Bibliography ==
- Bego, Mark (2000). Madonna: Blonde Ambition. Cooper Square Press. ISBN 978-0-8154-1051-5.
- Buckley, Peter (2003). The Rough Guide to Rock. Rough Guides. ISBN 1-84353-105-4.
- Clerk, Carol (2002). Madonnastyle. Omnibus Press. ISBN 0-7119-8874-9.
- Cross, Mary (2007). Madonna: A Biography. Greenwood Publishing Group. ISBN 978-0-313-33811-3.
- Feldman, Christopher (2000). Billboard Book of Number 2 Singles. Watson-Guptill. ISBN 0-8230-7695-4.
- Rooksby, Rikky (2004). The Complete Guide to the Music of Madonna. Omnibus Press. ISBN 0-7119-9883-3.
- Ryan, Gavin (2011). Australia's Music Charts 1988–2010. Mt. Martha, VIC, Australia: Moonlight Publishing.
- Taraborrelli, Randy J. (2002). Madonna: An Intimate Biography. Simon & Schuster. ISBN 0-7432-2880-4.
- White, Timothy (1997). Music to My Ears: The Billboard Essays : Portraits of Popular Music in the '90s. An Owl Book. H. Holt. ISBN 0-8050-5596-7.
