= We Can Freak It =

Single by Kurupt

from the album Kuruption!
- Released: August 1998
- Recorded: 1997–1998
- Genre: West Coast hip-hop; G-funk
- Length: 4:10
- Label: Antra; A&M
- Songwriters: Kurupt; Baby S; Battlecat; The Wilson Brothers
- Producer: Battlecat

Kurupt singles chronology
"We Can Freak It" (1998)	"Girls All Pause" (1999)

Music video
- "We Can Freak It" on YouTube

"We Can Freak It" is the debut single by American hip hop recording artist Kurupt, featuring vocals from American singers Baby S and Andre Wilson (of the Wilson Brothers). It was released as the single of his debut studio album Kuruption!, with the record labels Antra Records and A&M Records. The song was produced by Battlecat.

== Music video ==
The music video was released in August 1998 and it features cameos by Ice-T, Warren G, Snoop Dogg, Dresta, and WC.

== Track listing ==
- CD single
1. We Can Freak It (Clean Radio Edit) — 4:00
2. We Can Freak It (Bud'da Clean Radio Remix) (Remix Bud'da) — 4:00
3. We Can Freak It (LP Instrumental) — 4:19
4. We Can Freak It (Bud'da Remix Instrumental) (Remix Bud'da) — 4:20
5. We Can Freak It (Acappella) — 4:20

== Charts ==
=== Weekly charts ===
Chart (1998)	Peak position
US Bubbling Under Hot 100 (Billboard)	19
US Hot R&B/Hip-Hop Songs (Billboard)	89
US R&B/Hip-Hop Airplay (Billboard)	47
US Rhythmic Airplay (Billboard)	20
