= Falling into You (song) =

1994 song by Marie-Claire D'Ubaldo, covered by Céline Dion

"Falling into You" is a song by Argentine singer Marie-Claire D'Ubaldo from her 1994 album Marie-Claire D'Ubaldo. A Spanish-language version, "Y Caigo Un Poco Más", was also issued in 1994 on her album Alma de Barro. In 1996, the song was covered by Canadian singer Celine Dion and released as the first single from her album Falling into You.

== Celine Dion version ==
"Falling into You"

Single by Celine Dion

from the album Falling into You
- B-side: "I Don't Know"
- Released: 19 February 1996
- Studio: Mandeville; Track Recording; Westlake Audio & Ocean Way
- Genre: Pop
- Length: 4:18
- Label: Columbia; Epic
- Songwriters: Billy Steinberg; Rick Nowels; Marie-Claire D'Ubaldo
- Producers: Rick Nowels; Billy Steinberg

Celine Dion singles chronology
| "To Love You More" (1995) | "Falling into You" (1996) | "Because You Loved Me" (1996) |

Music video
- "Falling into You" on YouTube

Canadian singer Celine Dion recorded "Falling into You" for her fourth English-language album, Falling into You (1996). It includes backing vocals by co-writer Marie-Claire D'Ubaldo and was issued as the first single in Europe, Australia, and New Zealand in February 1996 by Columbia Records and Epic Records. In other markets, "Because You Loved Me" served as the lead single instead.

"Falling into You" reached number one in Spain and Greece, and became a top ten hit in Norway (number eight) and the UK (number ten). The single has sold 200,000 copies in the UK. The song has appeared on several of Dion's compilations, including the Australian edition of All the Way... A Decade of Song (1999), The Collector's Series, Volume One (2000), and European editions of My Love: Essential Collection (2008). Dion performed it during her Falling into You: Around the World tour in 1996–97 and on her Celine Dion Live 2018 tour.

=== Background ===
Rick Nowels initially offered the song to Belinda Carlisle for her album A Woman & a Man (1996). Although Carlisle recorded a demo, the track was rejected by her then‑manager Miles Copeland III. Nowels later played Carlisle's demo for Dion, which led to the song being considered for her album.

In her authorized biography Celine Dion: For Keeps, Dion recalled that she was initially dissatisfied with the first recording of "Falling into You". She felt that the arrangement was too forceful and that her vocal delivery did not reflect the subtlety she believed the song required. Although the production team and those around her were content with the result, Dion expressed her concerns to René Angélil, who encouraged her to articulate the changes she envisioned. After discussing her ideas with the director and engineer, the song was re-recorded with a gentler approach that aligned more closely with her interpretation. Dion later described the experience as an important moment in her artistic development, noting that the song worked well on the album but was not suited to large live performances because of its delicate character.

=== Critical reception ===
AllMusic senior editor Stephen Thomas Erlewine named "Falling into You" as one of the standouts on the album. Caroline Sullivan from The Guardian wrote that "only the autumnal 'Falling into You' and the hint-of-reggae (really) 'Make You Happy' diverge from the mainstream". Pan-European magazine Music & Media described the track as "a slow lullaby of a ballad, punctuated in the intro and outtro by Spanish guitars, martial sounding drum rolls and a 'Careless Whisper' type sax riff". A reviewer from Music Week awarded it five out of five, calling it "a restrained, angelically sung ballad, quite possibly Dion's most beautiful yet". In a retrospective review, Pip Ellwood-Hughes from Entertainment Focus described it as "gorgeous". Christopher Smith from TalkAboutPopMusic wrote that it is "sultry and schmoozy with only a hint of saxophone in the latter stages that add to the mood and sexiness of this down-tempo pop-ballad".

=== Music video ===
The music video for the song was directed by British director Nigel Dick and filmed between 18–19 January 1996 in Gorbio, France. It premiered in February 1996. The narrative is set in a small village, where Dion portrays a woman who is part of a group of circus performers. She receives flowers delivered by a young boy, evidently sent by a man, with a card reading "Bonne chance (Good luck)". Holding the bouquet, she begins to sing before sitting at a dressing table, where a clown helps her put on a long-haired wig. In the evening, the circus performs before a crowd. Various acts appear while Dion stands against a stone wall, singing with a visibly somber expression. A fire artist then takes the stage, and Dion assists him by handing him torches during his act. In one moment, she offers him a torch, but he chooses another instead. Dion later runs off into the night and drives away. The video concludes with her driving along a winding mountainside road in daylight, where she meets a motorcyclist who appears to be waiting for her. They embrace before the video ends. It was uploaded to YouTube in 2011 and had more than 11,700,000 views by August 2020. In March 2021, the video was remastered in HD to mark the 25th anniversary of the album's release.

=== Formats and track listing ===
- European CD and UK cassette single
1. "Falling into You" – 4:18
2. "I Don't Know" – 4:38
- French CD single
1. "Falling into You" – 4:18
2. "Le ballet" – 4:23
- Australian cassette and CD single; European 12-inch and CD single; UK CD single #1
1. "Falling into You" – 4:18
2. "I Don't Know" – 4:38
3. "Le ballet" – 4:23
- UK CD single #2
1. "Falling into You" – 4:17
2. "If That's What It Takes" – 4:09
3. "The Colour of My Love" – 3:23

=== Personnel ===
- Celine Dion – vocals
- Rick Nowels – composer, producer, gut string guitar, keyboards
- Billy Steinberg – composer, producer
- Marie-Claire D'Ubaldo – composer, backing vocals
- David Boruff – saxophone
- Sheila E. – percussion
- Steve MacMillan – mixing
- Jamie Muhoberac – keyboards
- Steve Farris – cavaquinho
- Pete Lorimer – drum programming
- Chris Garcia – drum programming
- Charlie Clouser – drum programming
- Curt Bisquera – drums
- Paul Bushnell – bass
- Maria Vidal – backing vocals
- Paul Buckmaster – conductor, arrangements

=== Charts ===
==== Weekly charts ====
Weekly chart performance
| Chart (1996) | Peak position |
|---|---|
| Australia (ARIA) | 12 |
| Austria (Ö3 Austria Top 40) | 28 |
| Belgium (Ultratop 50 Flanders) | 20 |
| Belgium (Ultratop 50 Wallonia) | 11 |
| Estonia (Eesti Top 20) | 10 |
| Europe (Eurochart Hot 100) | 11 |
| Europe (European AC Radio) | 3 |
| Europe (European Hit Radio) | 5 |
| France (SNEP) | 11 |
| Germany (GfK) | 71 |
| Hungary (Single Top 40) | 10 |
| Hungary (Rádiós Top 40) | 6 |
| Iceland (Íslenski Listinn Topp 40) | 20 |
| Ireland (IRMA) | 15 |
| Israel (Israeli Singles Chart) | 6 |
| Italy (Musica e dischi) | 19 |
| Italy Airplay (Music & Media) | 10 |
| Netherlands (Dutch Top 40) | 21 |
| Netherlands (Single Top 100) | 18 |
| New Zealand (Recorded Music NZ) | 21 |
| Norway (VG-lista) | 8 |
| Poland (ZPAV Airplay) | 6 |
| Scottish Singles Sales (Official Charts) | 15 |
| Spain (AFYVE) | 1 |
| Sweden (Sverigetopplistan) | 44 |
| Switzerland (Schweizer Hitparade) | 19 |
| UK Singles (Official Charts) | 10 |
| UK Airplay (Music Week) | 5 |

==== Year-end charts ====
Year-end chart performance
| Chart (1996) | Position |
|---|---|
| Australia (ARIA) | 98 |
| Belgium (Ultratop 50 Wallonia) | 67 |
| Europe (Eurochart Hot 100) | 78 |
| Europe (European Hit Radio) | 27 |
| France (SNEP) | 92 |
| Netherlands (Dutch Top 40) | 165 |
| UK Singles (OCC) | 81 |
| UK Airplay (Music Week) | 49 |

=== Certifications ===
Certifications
| Region | Certification | Certified units/sales |
|---|---|---|
| United Kingdom (BPI) | Silver | 200,000^{‡} |
^{‡} Sales+streaming figures based on certification alone.

=== Release history ===
Release history
| Region | Date | Format | Label | Ref. |
|---|---|---|---|---|
| United Kingdom | 19 February 1996 | Cassette; CD #1 | Epic | |
| United Kingdom | 26 February 1996 | CD #2 | Epic | |

== See also ==
- List of number-one singles of 1996 (Spain)
- List of UK top-ten singles in 1996
