= Conjure One =

Canadian electronic music project

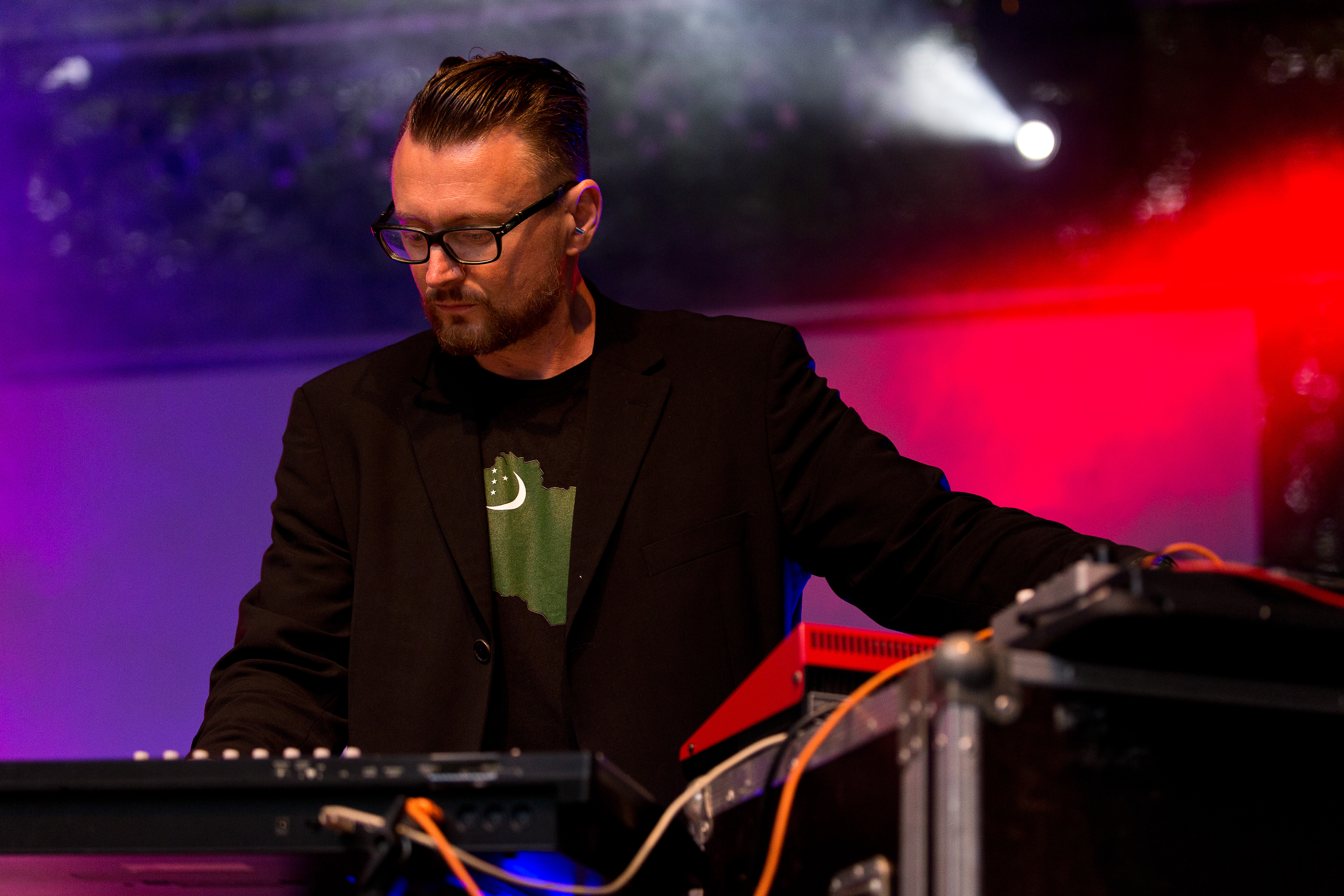
- Rhys Fulber in 2015

Background information
- Origin: Vancouver, British Columbia and Amsterdam
- Genres: Electronic; ambient; trip hop; pop; trance
- Years active: 1997–present
- Labels: Nettwerk, Armada
- Members: Rhys Fulber
- Website: conjureone.com

Conjure One is a Canadian electronic music project, headed by Rhys Fulber, better known as a member of Front Line Assembly and Delerium.

== History ==
After performing with Front Line Assembly at the 1996 Roskilde Festival, Fulber left the band to pursue a solo career. He set up a studio in Amsterdam; the influence of life there, and traveling to the Eastern Mediterranean, gave him the idea of an ethnic ambient project. Soon after, a debut album was announced, though Fulber's work as a producer and remixer eventually pushed its release to September 2002.

The resulting album, Conjure One, was a fusion of the electronic characteristics of Fulber's previous work—keyboard-based, with rhythmic dance beats—and the influences of Middle Eastern music, which inspired ambient melodies more reminiscent of Delerium.

A number of songs were more pop-oriented and featured guest vocalists, primarily Poe and Chemda, the latter singing entirely in Arabic. Marie-Claire D'Ubaldo, Sinéad O'Connor and Jeff Martin of The Tea Party were also featured.

After returning to Front Line Assembly and Delerium, in 2005 Fulber released a second album entitled Extraordinary Ways. This album utilized much more contemporary sounds, including much greater prominence given to guitars and trip hop beats. Vocalists included Tiff Lacey, Poe (credited as "Jane"), Chemda, Joanna Stevens, and Fulber himself (covering a song by the punk band Buzzcocks).

In 2007, Sandra Cretu covered "Sleep" as a bonus track on her single "The Way I Am".

2012 saw Fulber sign to Dutch dance label, Armada Music, and work began on what became the Holoscenic album.

== Discography ==
=== Albums ===
- Conjure One (Nettwerk, 2002)
- Extraordinary Ways (Nettwerk, 2005)
- Exilarch (Nettwerk, 2010)
- Holoscenic (Armada Music, 2015)
- Innovation Zero (Black Hole Recordings, 2022)

=== Singles ===
- "Redemption" (featuring Chemda) Promo Only (2001)
- "Sleep" (featuring Marie-Claire D'Ubaldo) (2002) – UK #42
- "Tears from the Moon" (featuring Sinéad O'Connor) (2003)
- "Center of the Sun" (featuring Poe) (2003)
- "Extraordinary Way" (featuring Poe) (2005)
- "Face the Music" (featuring Tiff Lacey) (2006)
- "I Dream in Colour" (featuring Leah Randi) (2010)
- "Like Ice" (featuring Jaren Cerf) (2011)
- "Under the Gun" (featuring Leigh Nash) (2013)
- "Still Holding On" (featuring Aruna) (2013)
- "Ghost" (featuring Kristy Thirsk) (2016)
- "Animals" (featuring Jaren) (2021)
- "Wolves at the Door" (featuring JEZA) (2022)
- "Wheels Come Off" (featuring JEZA) (2022)
- "I Don't Want To Go There" (featuring Jaren) (2023)

=== Collaborations ===
- Christian Burns – "Then There Were None" (from the album Simple Modern Answers) (2013)

=== Remixes ===
- P.O.D. – "Youth of the Nation" (Conjure One Remix) (2001)
- Alice Cooper – "I Never Cry" (Conjure One Remix) (2003)
- Collide – "Tempted" (Conjure One Mix) (2004)
- The Crüxshadows – "Dragonfly" (Conjure One Remix) (2005)
- The Realm – "Lost in Space" (Conjure One Remix) (2014)
- Mully and Shvman with Rily Shay – "Stranded" (Conjure One Remix) (2021)

== See also ==
- List of ambient music artists
