= Exilarch (album) =

Studio album by Conjure One
- Released: October 19, 2010
- Studio: Surplus Sound, Los Angeles · British Grove Studios, London
- Genre: Electronica, ethnic electronica, downtempo
- Length: 59:47
- Label: Nettwerk
- Producer: Rhys Fulber

Conjure One chronology
Extraordinary Ways (2005)	Exilarch (2010)	Holoscenic (2015)

Singles from Exilarch
- 1. "I Dream in Colour" Released: June 29, 2010; 2. "Like Ice" Released: April 12, 2011

Professional ratings
Review scores
Source	Rating
Release	8/10
Sputnikmusic	3.5/5 stars

Exilarch is the third album by Conjure One, a project of Canadian electronic musician and producer Rhys Fulber. The album was initially released as a worldwide digital download on October 19, 2010, while the physical release was made available in the US on November 9, 2010. The CD was eventually also released in UK and Europe on April 15, 2011.

== Release and promotion ==
The album spawned two singles ahead of its release. First out was the 7 track remix EP "I Dream in Colour", released on June 29, 2010. The second single, "Like Ice", was initially released for streaming only through Conjure One's official Myspace, but was later released as the album's second 7 track remix EP on April 12, 2011.

== Track listing ==
No.	Title	Length
1.	"Like Ice"	06:04
2.	"Places That Don't Exist"	06:02
3.	"Zephyr"	04:58
4.	"Nargis"	05:59
5.	"Nomadic Code"	08:50
6.	"The Distance"	03:55
7.	"I Dream in Colour"	06:33
8.	"Existential Exile"	05:51
9.	"Run for Cover"	06:25
10.	"Oligarch"	05:10

UK/European edition bonus track
No.	Title	Length
8.	"Demon Inside" (Bonus track shifts all following tracks by one position.)	05:14
Total length:		65:01

== Personnel ==
=== Conjure One ===
- Rhys Fulber – production, mixing, programming

=== Additional musicians ===
- Jaren Cerf – vocals (1, 3, 6)
- Leah Randi – vocals (7, 8), bass guitar, additional backing vocals
- Azam Ali – vocals (4)
- Free Dominguez – vocals (9)
- Jamie Muhoberac – additional keyboard
- Emerson Swinford – guitar
- Chris Elliott – strings arrangement (7, 11)
- Wired Strings – strings (7, 11)
- Mark Jowett – cello (1)
- Daniel Myer – additional drum loop (11)

=== Technical personnel ===
- Greg Reely – multitrack mastering (1), additional engineering (1), mixing (1), technical support
- Craig Waddell – mastering
- Frank Verschuuren – technical support
- Rick Smith – technical support
- Jaroslaw Baran – technical support
- Michał Karcz – cover art, design
- John Rummen – Conjure One logo
