= Safeway Goya =

American singer

- Birth name: Fred de Ráfols
- Also known as: Safeway; Safeway Goya
- Genres: New wave, dance-rock, art punk, experimental rock, pop rock
- Occupation(s): Musician, academic
- Instrument: Vocals
- Years active: 1980–1985
- Labels: Capitol Records, EMI

Safeway Goya was the stage name for Fred de Ráfols while lead singer of The Nobodys, an American new wave band from Los Angeles, California (not to be confused with the punk band of the same name from Colorado Springs, Colorado) best known for the 1984 album No Guarantees and its eponymous single.

"No Guarantees"
Audio sample from the album No Guarantees

== Career ==
Goya, of Spanish descent, chose the pen name "Safeway Goya" taken from the Safeway grocery store and the famous Spanish painter, Francisco Goya to reflect both his American and Spanish sides.

Goya and his brother, guitarist and keyboardist Alex Blanc, originally started their musical careers in Davis, California, in the early 1970s under the group name Squid. They also built a small recording studio in their mother's home on Anza Avenue. Appropriately, it was named Anza Studios and Silversleeves Productions. Anza Records produced a 45-RPM single in 1975 "Rain or Shine" / "Kick Up A Storm" that was engineered by Anthony Della Rosa.

Goya and Blanc independently wrote, produced and released a single, "Sex is a Bottomless Pit" on their self-founded label Whatever Records, and were subsequently signed to Capitol Records and EMI International, leading to a worldwide release of the album No Guarantees on August 8, 1984. Goya produced the album and wrote the songs with Blanc. The album featured Timex Burke on drums, Eric Garcia on bass and Ken Ypparila on keyboards. The album's tracks included "No Guarantees", "I Scratch", "They Didn't Offer Me You", "Just One Of Your Legs", "What Can I Do", "I Am Helpless Without My Computers", "Drops Of Water", "The Gang On Fortune Hill", and "I Don't Mind". The first single release, "No Guarantees", was accompanied by a video, shot in Amsterdam, Berlin, and Los Angeles. It was used in Michael Apted's 1984 movie Firstborn, starring Peter Weller and Teri Garr, and in episode 27, "Buddies", of the television series Miami Vice in 1985. In early 2023, the album was added to various streaming services, marking its first rerelease since 1984.

Fred de Ráfols was also an Academic at Johns Hopkins University. He now lives in Reno, Nevada and is a professor of Spanish at the University of Nevada, Reno.
