= Hey Pretty =

2000 song performed by Poe

Single by Poe

from the album Haunted
- Released: 2000
- Genre: Pop rock; alternative rock
- Length: 3:45
- Label: Atlantic Records
- Songwriters: Kenneth Burgomaster, Poe, Matthew Lawrence Wilder
- Producer: Poe

Poe singles chronology
"Control" (1998)	"Hey Pretty" (2000)

"Hey Pretty" is a song by singer-songwriter Poe. The song in its original version, on her 2000 album Haunted, was a sultry pop rant of a woman seeking sexual satisfaction by any means necessary. It was remade with most of her vocals eliminated and replaced with a reading by her brother, author Mark Z. Danielewski, from his hit book House of Leaves. This new version became a moderate radio hit.

Getting "Hey Pretty" on the radio was a challenge in 2001 as alternative radio was playing few female-led acts in the post-Lilith Fair backlash. In an interview with MTV, Poe explained the way in which the Drive-By Remix came about: "Radio was not interested. I called a few program directors, and they [said], 'We really love the record, but we're just not playing women.' This one [program director] in Portland, Oregon [94.7 KNRK's Mark Hamilton], said, 'My station is basically in the same boat. Do some crazy mix that you think will fit this format, and I'll play it once.' I go home, and I'm like, 'They're not playing women? Fine, I've got a brother.' So I called my brother, and I'm like, 'You gotta come over and read a piece of your book in this song.'... (The DJ) played it and got inundated with phone calls. By the end of the week he had played it 25 times, which wouldn't have meant all that much because it's a small station in Portland. But the next week, KROQ in Los Angeles had it. ..."

There are at least two different versions. One ends with the line, "Dark Languages Rarely Survive," followed by a woman saying, "Das nicht zu Hause sein" twice. This is German for "Not being at home", a recurring phrase in the book House of Leaves.

The second ending has that line followed by Poe coming back in with the chorus. The video, directed by Matthew Rolston, features erotic imagery of a scantily-dressed Poe washing, driving, and lounging on a vintage car along with a look-alike model with a similar build, hair, and identical outfit. The car scenes are interlaced with shots of Mark Danielewski performing the spoken-word portions of the song, as well as footage of Poe and her look-alike mud wrestling. The song was featured on the soundtrack to the MTV original series Spyder Games.

In January 2009 Ford began using the original version of the song in television commercials.

== Tracks ==
1. "Hey Pretty" – 3:53
2. "Hey Pretty" (Drive-By 2001 Mix) – 3:46

== Charts ==
Billboard (United States)

Chart (2001)	Peak position
Adult Top 40	30
Modern Rock Tracks	13
