= Chillout 2002/The Ultimate Chillout =

Compilation album by various artists
- Released: May 7, 2002
- Genre: Chill-out
- Length: 74:45
- Label: Nettwerk

The Ultimate Chillout chronology
Chillout 2001: V.1 (2001)	Chillout 2002/The Ultimate Chillout (2002)	Chillout 2003/The Ultimate Chillout (2003)

Chillout 2002/The Ultimate Chillout is a compilation album released by Nettwerk. It was released on May 7, 2002.

== Critical reception ==
Professional ratings
Review scores
Source	Rating
AllMusic	3/5 stars

Billboard considered it a good compilation for those "in need of some post-club musical excursions".

== Track listing ==
Adapted from AllMusic and the album's official liner notes.

No.	Title	Writer(s)	Performer	Length
1.	"Here with Me" (Rollo's Chilln' with the Family Mix)	Dido Armstrong; Pascal Angel Gabriel; Paul Statham	Dido	5:15
2.	"Trouble"	Guy Berryman; Jonny Buckland; Will Champion; Chris Martin	Coldplay	4:29
3.	"Street Spirit (Fade Out)"	Colin Greenwood; Jonny Greenwood; Ed O'Brien; Phil Selway; Thom Yorke	Radiohead	4:11
4.	"Angel" (Dusted Mix)	Sarah McLachlan	Sarah McLachlan	5:28
5.	"Teardrop" (Mad Professor Mazaruni Vocal Mix)	Elizabeth Fraser; Grantley Marshall; Mushroom; Robert "3D" del Naha	Massive Attack	6:05
6.	"Hayling"	John Collyer	FC Kahuna	6:47
7.	"Destiny"	Henry Binns; Sam Hardaker	Zero 7	5:37
8.	"Swollen"	Zoë Johnston; Simon Mills; Nail Tolliday	Bent	7:23
9.	"Not 17" (Attica Blues Mix)	Nicola Hitchcock	Mandalay	3:44
10.	"Intensify" (Blind Faith Remix)	Ally Kennen; Nick Warren; Jody Wisternoff	Way Out West	6:38
11.	"Shame" (Bent Mix)	BT	BT	7:44
12.	"Edge of the Ocean" (Duotone Mix)	Ivy	Ivy	4:13
13.	"Silence" (Michael Woods Remix)	Rhys Fulber; Bill Leeb; McLachlan	Delerium	7:11
Total length:				74:45

== Charts ==
Chart (2002)	Peak position
US Top Dance/Electronic Albums (Billboard)	23
