= Marie-Claire D'Ubaldo =

Argentine singer

Marie Claire D'Ubaldo (born January 17, 1961) is an Argentine singer/musician and a prolific songwriter; she has appeared as a guest vocalist on many albums. She had her biggest success with her 1994 European hit single "The Rhythm Is Magic" as well as "Falling Into You" which was covered by Celine Dion, who also named her album after the single. Dion's album has sold well in excess of 30 million albums worldwide.

== Biography ==
Marie Claire D'Ubaldo released her debut album, Marie Claire in Japan (only) in 1990. Her follow-up Spanish language album, Alma de Barro, was released in 1994, and the English Language version, Marie Claire D'Ubaldo, was released internationally in the same year. Her biggest personal hit was "The Rhythm Is Magic"; it went to number 1 in Italy for 5 weeks in the summer – was the 4th most air played single of the year – and was used in the soundtrack to the Italian film Il Ciclone. The song and album did very well in Italy, Japan, Latin America, Hispanic North America, Austria, Finland, Norway, and Russia. Other songs featured on the album were written with Rick Nowels (Belinda Carlisle/Stevie Nicks), Billy Steinberg (Eternal Flame/True Colours/Like a Virgin etc.), and Tony Moore (ex-Cutting Crew)

Marie Claire was signed by creative executive, Dave Massey, to a songwriting agreement at leading independent music publisher, Hit & Run Music Publishing in 1993 (see Billboard photo). D'Ubaldo was a rare instance of a UK based publisher signing a Latin-influenced artist / songwriter. Massey's meeting with Annie Rosebery (then at Elektra in London), who was interested in signing Marie Claire, led to the collaboration with Nowels and Steinberg.

At the beginning of 1995, Polydor had closed its US office and Davitt Sigerson, who had signed Marie Claire to the label, had left. According to Tony Moore (ex-Cutting Crew and songwriter / musician and friend of Marie Claire's), 'nobody at Polygram was serious about supporting the album or recording a new one and didn't see "Falling Into You" as a hit, they dropped her'.

Marie Claire is best known for her singles "The Rhythm Is Magic" and "Falling Into You" which was written and originally performed by Marie Claire, but later covered by Celine Dion; the single was to become the title track for Celine's album. The original backing track recorded by Marie-Claire, along with her own backing vocals, is the version used by Dion. This version was used in the film 'Terminal Velocity'.

During the late 1990s and early millennium, Marie Claire often performed live in London at The Kashmir Klub and The Bedford, performing the tracks she had written for herself and other artists. In 2002, Marie Claire did the vocals for two songs on the self-titled debut album by Conjure One, Manic Star and Sleep

== Discography ==
=== Albums ===
- Marie Claire (1990) (Japanese only release)

Label: Teichiku Japan

1. "Highway" 3:42 (A.Friedman/M.Bell)
2. "Changing Faces" 5:16 (L.Taylor / D.Inoue / M.Calire / K.Harada)
3. "The Night Is Always Right" 3:31 (M.Millington / A.Friedman)
4. "Time" 4:58 (M.Millington / A.Friedman / M.Claire)
5. "Burning Rivers" 4:04 (M.Claire / M. Millington / A.Friedman)
6. "I Can Never Believe (What You Say)" 5:01 (M.Millington / A.Friedman / M.Claire)
7. "Going Home" 4:10 (S.Tatler / M.Claire / K.Harada)
8. "Nothing Left to Hide" 4:38 (M.Millington / A.Friedman)
9. "Touch" 3:08 (A.Friedman / M.Millington / S.Rahmatallah)
- Alma De Barro (1994)

Label: Polygram

1. "La Magia Del Ritmo" (The Rhythm Is Magic)
2. "Los Ojos De Mi Padre (Volveras)" (My Fathers Eyes)
3. "Y Caigo Un Poco Mas" (Falling Into you)
4. "Nocturna"
5. "Heroes De Papel"
6. "Hay Un Carnaval" (Carnival In Heaven)
7. "Tanger"
8. "Voces"
9. "Alma De Barro"
10. "A Woman's Love"
11. "Donde Estan"
12. "Venteveo"
13. "The Rhythm Is Magic"
- Marie Claire D’Ubaldo (1994)

Label: Polydor

This is the English-language version of Alma De Barro; whilst both albums share some of the same songs, both have exclusive new tracks, thus both are essential for fans.

1. "The Rhythm Is Magic"
2. "My Father's Eyes"
3. "Falling Into You"
4. "Rachel"
5. "Only Human"
6. "Carnival In Heaven"
7. "Burning Rivers"
8. "No Turning Back"
9. "Alma De Barro"
10. "Woman's Love"
11. "Outside"
12. "Venteveo"

Credits

- Personnel includes:
  - Marie Claire D'Ubaldo (vocals, Spanish guitar, 12-string guitar, percussion, programming);
  - John Themis (Spanish guitar, saz);
  - Tony Moore (Spanish guitar, keyboards, electric bass, programming, background vocals);
  - Andy Reynolds (keyboards, programming);
  - Andrew Smith (guitar);
  - Rick Nowels (guitar, keyboards);
  - Steve Farris (cavaquinho);
  - Mauricio Venegas (charango, sikus, rainstick, cha cha);
  - Sid Page (violin);
  - John Thirkle (strings);
  - Phil Smith (strings, soprano saxophone);
  - Peter Thomas (strings, trombone);
  - David Boruff (saxophone);
  - Paul Spong (trumpet);
  - Neil Sidwell (trombone);
  - Richard Kottle Bushnell, John Thompson (bass);
  - Martin "Frosty" Beedle (drums);
  - Sheila E (percussion).
- Producers:
  - Phil Chapman, Frank Musker, Richard Darbyshire (tracks 1, 6, 13);
  - Rick Nowels, Billy Steinberg (tracks 2–3);
  - Marie Claire D'Ubaldo (tracks 4, 7, 9, 11, 12);
  - Davitt Sigerson (track 5);
  - John Themis (track 8);
  - Desmond Child (track 10).
- Engineers:
  - Phil Chapman (tracks 1, 6, 8, 13);
  - Steve MacMillan (tracks 2–3);
  - Norman Goodman (tracks 4, 7, 9, 11, 12);
  - John Beverly Jones, Brian Malouf (track 5);
  - Matthew Gruber (track 10).
- All songs written or co-written by Marie Claire D'Ubaldo except "A Woman's Love" (Desmond Child).
- Songwriting & Duets, Pt. 1 (2009)

Label: Edel

This album has only been released in Italy (to date) in December 2009, on the back of the success of the re-recorded 2009 version of Rhythm is Magic (duet with Lola Ponce).

1. "1 Il segreto sta nel ritmo (duet With Lola Ponce)"
2. "2 Blue Boy (duet With Laura Critchley)"
3. "3 Sueños (duet With Gerardina Trovato)"
4. "4 Roses of Violence"
5. "5 Lay Down Your Arms"
6. "6 Only One World (with Federico Poggipollini)"
7. "7 Don't Suffer"
8. "8 The Rhythm Is Magic 2010 (duet With Dr Feelx)"

=== Singles ===
- Time - Japanese only release by TEICHIKU Japan, TEDP-2.

Track Listing:

1. "Time"
2. "The Night Is Always Right"
- The Rhythm Is Magic
1. The Rhythm Is Magic (Album Version) (4:01)
2. The Rhythm Is Magic (Tee Club Mix) (4:47)
3. The Rhythm Is Magic (Tee Rubber Mix) (7:13)
4. The Rhythm Is Magic (Spanish Radio) (3:49)
- My Fathers Eyes
1. My Fathers Eyes(Remix) 3:52
2. My Fathers Eyes 4:46
3. Nocturna 3:55
4. The Rhythm Is Magic (Tee Radio Mix) 4:06
- Sleep by Conjure One with Marie Claire as guest vocalist

Label "Netwerkk"

1. Sleep (Ian Van Dahl Remix) (Edit)
2. Tears From The Moon (Hybrid Twisted On The Terrace Mix V2)
3. Tears From The Moon (Robbie Rivera Mix)

The 12" edition contains the following remixes.

1. Sleep (Mixed by Max Graham)
2. Sleep (Ian Van Dahl Remix)
3. Sleep (Angel Alanis and Smitty Mix)

== Videos ==
- "Los Ojos De Mi Padre" ("My Fathers Eyes") English and Spanish versions Directed by Dani Jacobs Filmed in Buenos Aires.

You can watch Marie Claire's promo videos at the following links:

1. The Rhythm Is Magic
2. La Magia del Ritmo
3. Los Ojos De Mi Padre
4. Blue Boy ft.Laura Critchley

== Guest appearances ==
1. "Falling Into You" by Celine Dion - Marie Claire on backing vocals
2. "Manic Star" on the album Conjure One by Conjure One
3. "Sleep" on Conjure One by Conjure One
4. "Y Dale Algeria A Mi Corazon" with Union (from "World In Union - The Official Album of the Rugby World Cup"
5. "Blue boy feat. Laura Critchley"from album Songwriting and duets" label: 1st POP ITALY

== Recorded tracks co-written by D'Ubaldo ==
In addition to her own recordings, D'Ubaldo has co-written the following tracks, recorded by other artists:

1. "Falling into You" by Celine Dion
2. "I Have Always Loved You" by Enrique Iglesias
3. "I Have Always Loved You" by No Mercy
4. "A Prayer For Everyone" by Belinda Carlisle
5. "The Consequences Of Falling" by k.d. lang
6. "One & One" by Robert Miles featuring Maria Nayler
7. "Intimacy" by The Corrs
8. "Casino Royale" by Sandra (alternative version of 'Sleep With Me' by Edyta Górniak)
9. "Sleep With Me" by Edyta Górniak
10. "Above The Clouds" by Amber
11. "Yes" by Amber
12. "Fearless" by Claire Johnston
13. "He'll Come Home" by Rita Kleinstein (aka 'My Father's Eyes')
14. "Carnival In Heaven" by Malandra Burrows
15. "Slave To My Feelings" by Pure Sugar
16. "Love You Senseless" by Pure Sugar
17. "Amor" by Lola Ponce
18. "Rozmowa z aniolem" (When I Fell) by Magda Femme
19. "Human Traffic" by OdD

== Published / copyrighted tracks co-written by D'Ubaldo ==
1. "69 Floors Above The Street"
2. "Afterglow"
3. "Al oido"
4. "Am i mad"
5. "Among the many wonders of the..."
6. "Another girl"
7. "Better late than never"
8. "Butterfly"
9. "Clementina"
10. "Coming from the heart"
11. "Confessions"
12. "Cry when the night is so old"
13. "Devil made me do it"
14. "Don’t suffer"
15. "El Viajero Fiel"
16. "Esmerelda"
17. "Even when you cried"
18. "For you once upon a time"
19. "Free the spirit"
20. "Give me one more dance"
21. "Half"
22. "Heart of you"
23. "Heaven help this heart of mine"
24. "How long before"
25. "I don’t know"
26. "I Feel You"
27. "I release you"
28. "In the land of the blind"
29. "Inside my universe"
30. "Jackpot"
31. "Kiss so light"
32. "Lay down your arms"
33. "Learn to fly"
34. "Let it go"
35. "Listen to the rain"
36. "Love is breaking my heart"
37. "Loving me loving you"
38. "Lunatic"
39. "Mankind"
40. "Mas y mas"
41. "Maybe i was mistaken"
42. "Mi Heroe"
43. "Moment"
44. "Mother Russia"
45. "Muses Released"
46. "My Own"
47. "Mystery of Life"
48. "Nao Posso"
49. "No Words"
50. "Nothing"
51. "Nuestra Illusion"
52. "On The Surface"
53. "One Flew West Love Has Strange"
54. "Once Last Dream"
55. "Once More Dance"
56. "Once More For The Dreamers"
57. "Only One World"
58. "Only Thing I Want"
59. "Too Late To Say Goodnight"
60. "Totally Insane"
61. "Under The Feet"
62. "Recuerdo"
63. "Salvation"
64. "Si"
65. "Silent Lullaby"
66. "So Little Time"
67. "Soy"
68. "Taking My Life Back"
69. "Talk About love"
70. "Tan Solo Una Vez Mas"
71. "Tangier Amended"
72. "There’s A Tiny Door"
73. "Totally Insane"
74. "Tout Est Dit"
75. "Voice"
76. "Void"
77. "We Drove Wild"
78. "We’re One And The Same"
79. "When I Fell"
80. "When You Smile"
81. "You Can Never Get Enough"
