= The Rhythm Is Magic =

Single by Marie-Claire D'Ubaldo

from the album Alma De Barro/Marie Claire D'Ubaldo
- Released: 1994
- Studio: A Major Studios
- Genre: Latin-pop; house
- Length: 4:01 (album version); 4:10 (Tee radio mix)
- Label: Polydor
- Songwriters: Frank Musker; Marie-Claire D'Ubaldo; Richard Darbyshire
- Producers: Frank Musker; Phil Chapman; Richard Darbyshire

Marie-Claire D'Ubaldo singles chronology
"Time" (1990)	"The Rhythm Is Magic" (1994)	"My Father's Eyes" (1994)

"The Rhythm Is Magic" is a song by Argentine London-based singer-songwriter Marie-Claire D'Ubaldo, released in 1994 by Polydor Records as the first single from the singer's second album, Alma De Barro/Marie-Claire D'Ubaldo (1994). The song is written by D'Ubaldo with Frank Musker and Richard Darbyshire, who also produced it with Phil Chapman. It is her most successful release and was a number-one hit in Italy for four weeks and a top-10 hit in Austria. It became the fourth most air played single of the year in Italy and was also used on the soundtrack to the 1996 Italian film Il Ciclone. D'Ubaldo also released the song in Spanish as "La Magia Del Ritmo".

== Critical reception ==
After the album release, Paul Verna and Marilyn A. Gillen from Billboard magazine stated that the "sweet-voiced singer/songwriter contains enough hit singles", like "La Magia Del Ritmo", "to at least cause a stir at progressive AC/pop outlets." Upon the single release, Music & Media wrote, "Analogue to Miami Sound Machine's mix of Cuban music with pop, D'Ubaldo executes the flamenco flavour. One sunbeam is enough to get radio behind this magic rhythm, like Radio Regenbogen/Mannheim music director Martin Schwebel does. 'The song is an interesting cross between Gloria Estefan's 'The Rhythm Is Gonna Get You' and Gipsy Kings stuff, and therefore an obvious candidate for the summertime playlist.'"

Music & Media editor Machgiel Bakker commented, "A cheerful Caribbean-tinged record is invading airwaves by an artist whose name is as exotic as the sound of the music she produces—Marie Claire D'Ubaldo. Signed to the US arm of Polydor, D'Ubaldo's single 'The Rhythm Is Magic' is shaping up to become the summer hit of 1994. Backed by an enormous amount of Italian airplay, the record is now gradually making impact in the GSA market, Benelux, Sweden and Denmark and is EHR Chartbound this week." Alan Jones from Music Week gave it three out of five, writing, "An odd flamenco-inflected song which was co-written by the singer with veterans Frank Musker and Richard Darbyshire. A Top 30 club record, so chances are it'll be a hit for the stunning Argentinian."

== Track listing ==
- 12-inch, Italy (1994)

A1. "The Rhythm Is Magic" (Party Time Mix) — 5:10
A2. "The Rhythm Is Magic" (Radio Mix) — 3:45
B1. "The Rhythm Is Magic" (Dance Authority Mix) — 5:10

- 12-inch, UK (1994)

A1. "The Rhythm Is Magic" (Tee Club Mix) — 4:40
A2. "The Rhythm Is Magic" (Album Version) — 4:01
B1. "The Rhythm Is Magic" (Tee Rubber Mix) — 7:13
B2. "The Rhythm Is Magic" (Spanish Radio) — 3:46

- 12-inch vinyl, Italy (1994)

A1. "The Rhythm Is Magic" (Tee Club Mix) — 4:40
A2. "The Rhythm Is Magic" (Album Version) — 4:01
B1. "The Rhythm Is Magic" (Tee Rubber Mix) — 7:13
B2. "The Rhythm Is Magic" (Spanish Radio) — 3:46

- CD single, Europe (1994)
1. "The Rhythm Is Magic" (Album Version) — 4:01
2. "The Rhythm Is Magic" (Tee Radio Mix) — 4:10
- CD single, Spain (1994)
1. "The Rhythm Is Magic" (Album Version) — 4:10
2. "The Rhythm Is Magic" (Tee Radio Mix) — 4:10
- CD single, UK (1994)
1. "The Rhythm Is Magic" (Album Version) — 4:01
2. "The Rhythm Is Magic" (Tee Club Mix) — 4:40
3. "The Rhythm Is Magic" (Tee Rubber Mix) — 7:13
4. "The Rhythm Is Magic" (Spanish Radio Version) — 3:46
- CD maxi-single, Europe (1994)
1. "The Rhythm Is Magic" (Album Version) — 4:01
2. "The Rhythm Is Magic" (Tee Club Mix) — 4:47
3. "The Rhythm Is Magic" (Tee Rubber Mix) — 7:13
4. "The Rhythm Is Magic" (Spanish Radio Version) — 3:49
- CD maxi-single, Japan (1994)
1. "The Rhythm Is Magic" (Album Version) — 4:03
2. "The Rhythm Is Magic" (Tee Radio Mix) — 4:42
3. "The Rhythm Is Magic" (Tee Rubber Mix) — 7:16
4. "The Rhythm Is Magic" (Spanish Radio Version) — 3:47
- Cassette single, Europe (1994)

A. "The Rhythm Is Magic" (Album Version) — 4:01
B. "The Rhythm Is Magic" (Tee Radio Mix) — 4:10

== Charts ==
=== Weekly charts ===
Chart (1994)	Peak position
Austria (Ö3 Austria Top 40)	7
Europe (Eurochart Hot 100)	72
Europe (European AC Radio)	18
Europe (European Dance Radio)	2
Europe (European Hit Radio)	39
Greece (Pop + Rock)	9
Iceland (Íslenski Listinn Topp 40)	30
Italy (Musica e dischi)	1
Netherlands (Dutch Top 40 Tipparade)	2
Netherlands (Single Top 100)	43
UK Singles (OCC)	81
UK Club Chart (Music Week)	29

=== Year-end charts ===
Chart (1994)	Rank
Italy (Musica e dischi)	10

Chart (1995)	Rank
Latvia (Latvijas Top 50)	233
