= Poe (singer) =

American singer-songwriter

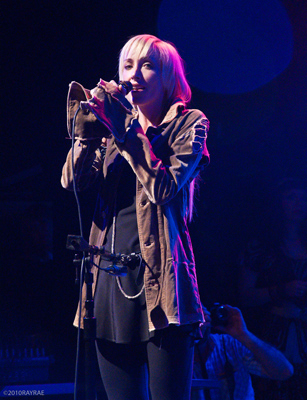
- Poe at The El Rey Theatre Los Angeles, California, 2010 (photo by Ray Rae)

Background information
- Also known as: Poe; OfficialPoe; Official Poe; Poe Official; Ms Poe; Realpoe; POE Grooves
- Born: Anne Decatur Danielewski; March 23, 1968 (age 58); New York City, New York, United States
- Genres: Alternative rock; pop rock; electronic; trip hop; R&B
- Occupations: Musician; songwriter
- Instruments: Vocals; piano; guitar
- Years active: 1995–present
- Labels: Modern/Atlantic; POE/Repoezessed Records

Poe (born Anne Decatur Danielewski /ˈdæniəlɛfski/; March 23, 1968) is an American singer, songwriter, and record producer. Poe's musical style is a blend of rock, jazz, electronica, folk, and hip-hop elements combined with intimate lyrical compositions. Many of Poe's songs have been featured in films and on television. Poe first hit the modern rock charts in 1995.

Some of her early charting singles included "Angry Johnny", "Trigger Happy Jack", "Hello", and "Hey Pretty". Videos for these singles had heavy rotation on MTV. Poe spent six years with Atlantic Records and is currently on her own label, Repoezessed Music Records.

Poe's involvement with her online community of fans via her website and the fan sites that supported her early in her career predated modern social networking platforms and were among the first of their kind. Atlantic Records' Senior Vice President of New Media, Nikki Sleight, referred to Poe's online power and one-on-one communication with thousands attending her concerts as "unheard of and pretty phenomenal" in Sleight's 1997 interview with Web Magazine.

In 2004, she co-founded the digital innovations agency Signature Creative Inc with John Gheur.

In September 2014, Poe received the title of UNICEF Goodwill Ambassador due to her invitation by Yoko Ono to participate in a UNICEF campaign and her donated performance. The campaign launched a world version of John Lennon's classic song "Imagine" featuring dozens of musical artists from around the world. Poe joined others singing in the music video that included a video clip of John Lennon that spearheads a global campaign by UNICEF to celebrate the 25th anniversary of the Convention on the Rights of the Child.

== Early life ==
Born in New York City, Poe is the daughter of Polish film director Tad Z. Danielewski and his wife Priscilla Decatur Machold. Poe and her brother, novelist Mark Z. Danielewski, lived in six different countries before she turned eight. Her father's film directing took the family to Africa, India, Spain, Switzerland, England, and the United States. When Poe was 12, her father moved his family to Provo, Utah to join the Arts faculty at Brigham Young University. Poe attended junior high school and some of high school in Provo. When Poe's parents divorced, Poe, then 16, left home and moved to New York City where she lived in a squat on the lower east side of Manhattan while attempting to connect with her estranged mother. Poe continued submitting schoolwork to her high school in Utah and eventually graduated. She pursued her undergraduate studies at Princeton University, where she organized her first band.

== Early career ==
Poe began experimenting with musical samplers and sequencers as a teenager. Noteworthy are her early collaborations with J Dilla of Slum Village. Poe's musical influences ranged "from Black Flag to Bob Dylan -- from Billie Holiday to Tribe Called Quest" according to music writer Stephen Grecco.

Poe was signed to Modern/Atlantic Records in 1994 on the strength of the demos she made with J Dilla and RJ Rice in RJ's living room in Detroit.

On January 28, 1996, The New York Times named Poe, along with Alanis Morissette, among the defining voices of the current "movement in music" which featured "angry" female artists who were "...articulate, sexually explicit, both lover and fighter...(women who) reject self-pity and refuse to define themselves purely in terms of their connection to men." In September 1996, Glamour published a picture of Poe, with a snarl on her face and wearing a tee-shirt on which she had written the words, "Happy-Well-Adjusted Female." In the accompanying interview, Poe says "I don't think 'Angry' really sums it up at all!" In the November 14, 1996, issue of Rolling Stone, Poe's album, "Hello," attained a position on the Reader's Top Ten Chart. and in August 1997, Esquire named Poe, along with Gwen Stefani, Lil' Kim, and Sarah McLachlan among the top five "Women Who Rock Our World".

Poe began her first major tour in January 1996, as the opening act for Lenny Kravitz. She and her touring band (Daris Adkins on Guitar, Dan Marfisi "Jones" on Drums, Toby Skard on bass, and Cameron Stone on cello) then continued touring extensively as headliners and at festivals until 1999, when she stopped to begin pre-production on her second album for Atlantic. Pollstar Magazine reported in 1998 that Poe had performed for approximately 600 shows in a two-year time period.

=== Hello ===
Poe's first album, Hello, was released in 1995. Musically, the album was described as a sample-rich amalgam of hip-hop, rock, and jazz. Lyrically, the album was filled with literary allusions, film nods, comic book references, and psychological irony. The CD was critically acclaimed. Hits Magazine called "Hello" an "over-the-top PoMo masterpiece." In an interview on Spotify's Landmark series discussing the making of Alanis Morissette's Jagged Little Pill, Glen Ballard quoted "Hello was probably the biggest influence I had at that time, honestly, because it was a brilliant record that had jazz influence, hip hop, electronic, rock. It was a hybrid of the first degree."

Not long after the album's release, Poe's single, "Trigger Happy Jack (Drive By a Go-Go)" broke into the top 20 of the Billboard Alternative and Modern Rock chart. "Trigger Happy Jack" was produced by Dave Jerden (Jane's Addiction, Alice in Chains) and Jeffrey Connor and featured Matt Sorum (of Guns N' Roses) on drums and Dean Pleasants (of Suicidal Tendencies) on guitar.

Poe met Jeffrey Connor towards the completion of the record as a session bassist she hired for additional overdubs on "Hello". Connor had given Poe a track he started writing after working with her. Poe heard the demo and passed it to Jerden who immediately gave the track the green light and had Connor come in to produce. Connor brought in Sorum and Pleasants for what was to become "Trigger Happy Jack". It featured the lyric "You can't talk to a psycho like a normal human being". The song's video went into high rotation on MTV and introduced Poe to the mainstream. Also in 1997, Atlantic released a maxi CD and 12-inch vinyl single of "Trigger Happy Jack" which included "The Drive By Remix" and "The Psycho Demolition Mix" by Steve Lyon, an instrumental version of the song, and a "Poe Only" Mix. Another single, "Angry Johnny", broke into the top 10 of Billboard's Modern Rock chart, and also enjoyed heavy rotation on radio. The song's video received high rotation on MTV. The song featured the line, "I wanna blow you...(pause) away." A promotional maxi-single of the song was released to radio but was never available commercially. This single included a "Band Mix" produced by Poe and Matt Sorum that received heavy rotation on radio. There was another remix done by the Spanish producer Jesus N. Gomez.

In August 1997, Atlantic released a maxi-single of the song "Hello" that included six remixes of the song ("Hello: E-Smoove Funk Mix" by E-Smoove/ "Hello: Modern Mix" by Edge Factor/ "Hello: Nevins Electronica Mix" by Jason Nevins/ "Hello: The Generator Mix by E-Smoove/ "Hello: The Edge Factor Mix" by, Edge Factor, and "Hello: Trial Dub Mix" by Edge Factor.)

On September 13, 1997, "Hello" hit number one on the Billboard Hot Dance chart. The video for this song also enjoyed heavy rotation on MTV.

On November 20, 1997, the RIAA awarded Hello gold certification.

=== Haunted ===
Poe's second album, Haunted, was released in October 2000. The album, produced by Poe and Olle Romo was inspired by Poe's discovery of a box of audio tapes that contained recordings of her late father's voice. Listening to those tapes for the first time proved so difficult for Poe that she was hesitant to use them in her music. She was quoted in the Los Angeles Times, "I took these tapes home, and I couldn't listen to them. It was too hard, so I kept finding ways to avoid it. They were sitting on my coffee table next to a boombox for quite some time." Poe was quoted in the New York Daily News about when she finally listened to the tapes, "It was clear how the next few years of my life would be spent."

Haunted was embraced by the press. The Los Angeles Times wrote that "The wait for Poe's follow up to her debut album has paid off with rich, sophisticated, songs of depth and emotional intensity." They instructed audiences to "Think of Haunted as the equivalent of Pink Floyd's The Wall." They added that "Poe's version is more succinct, darker in parts, but just as accessible." The New York Daily News wrote, "Samples of Poe's late father's voice and heartfelt musings weave in and out of the songs on Haunted, providing a narrative structure inside which Poe attempts to put her father's ghost to rest." AllMusic wrote that "(Poe's) original compositions have the makings for a new music revolution alongside the likes of Radiohead's Kid A". Elle magazine credited Poe with "...defining the future of pop". Maxim magazine called Haunted, "The best mindf**k you'll get all year." The publication Indiana Statesman described Haunted as "one of the most influential and innovative albums of this decade," further claiming that "...this digitally produced album far outshines any studio album produced thus far."

The first single from Haunted, "Hey Pretty", hit the top 20 on the Billboard Modern Rock chart at a time when female musicians and singers in the format rarely got airtime. At the end of 2000, the only two women in the Billboard top 100 year-end Modern Rock Chart were Gwen Stefani and Poe. MTV put the "Hey Pretty" video into heavy rotation, and in July 2001, Poe was invited to be the opening act for Depeche Mode's Exciter Tour.

Haunted was also referred to in the 2002 film Panic Room. In a conversation between Jodie Foster's character, Meg Altman, and the agent selling the home containing the Panic Room, Sarah Altman (Meg's daughter, played by Kristen Stewart) asks "Ever read any Poe?", to which the response given is "No, but I loved her last album!"

Also in 2000, Atlantic released a promotional CD single of the song, "Haunted", which included a remix by Grammy-winning producer/musician Chris Vrenna (Nine Inch Nails, Marilyn Manson).

=== With Mark Danielewski ===
Poe's brother, Mark Z. Danielewski, is a best-selling novelist, and as young children Mark and Poe formed a creative relationship wherein Poe would read and edit the pages her brother wrote. In 1997, Poe sent a manuscript of her brother's first novel House of Leaves to Warren Frazier, who was a college friend of hers and who had become an agent at John Hawkins Literary Agency in New York. Warren agreed to represent Mark and eventually secured a publishing deal for Mark at Pantheon Books. In 2000, Pantheon published House of Leaves, releasing it to coincide with the release of Poe's second album Haunted. Poe invited Mark to do a spoken word passage in her "Drive By 2001" remix of the song "Hey Pretty" and also invited him to perform this passage in both her video and live show opening for Depeche Mode. Of his sister's support, Mark recounts how he once in a moment of rage tore the handwritten manuscript of a story called "Redwood" into tiny pieces and threw it into a dumpster. Poe rescued the pieces from the dumpster and taped the entire manuscript back together. It took her two weeks.

In October-November 2000, Poe performed a tour of Borders with her brother. Their set included Mark reading passages from House of Leaves and Poe singing songs that share themes with the book. House of Leaves made the New York Times Best Seller list in April 2000.

=== Effect of AOL–Time Warner merger ===
With Haunted climbing the charts, Atlantic Records announced that it had renewed Poe's contract for three more albums. It renewed its agreement with the boutique label, Modern/FEI Records (Fishkin Entertainment, Inc.) through which Poe was signed to Atlantic. Atlantic also committed to releasing and distributing Haunted internationally and serviced the album globally. Shortly thereafter, it printed promo copies of "Wild", the second single from Haunted, which included a remix by Static Revenger. Copies of that single were never sent to radio.

A merger of Time Warner, the parent company of Atlantic, and AOL was approved by the FCC in January 2001. AOL Time Warner was under close scrutiny to show positive results almost immediately after the merger. With a softening of the economy after the FCC approval, it began close review of all relationships with third-party production houses, such as Modern Records.

In November 2001, six weeks after renewing Poe's contract, Billboard Magazine announced that Atlantic was severing ties with Modern/FEI records.

The result was that Poe was dropped from Atlantic's roster of artists. Poe's manager and Modern/FEI label head Paul Fishkin stated that "Poe was stunned to be let go as Atlantic had just picked up its option on her next three albums and had already printed promo CDs of her next single 'Wild' and sent them to radio." Val Azzoli, then President of Atlantic, said to Billboard Magazine of dropping Poe, "Poe must be feeling pretty bruised right about now," adding that Atlantic had simply made a business decision. The article points out that it was a strange decision in light of the fact that, "according to SoundScan, Haunted had sold 250,000 copies and the album's first single, 'Hey Pretty', had only come out two months prior." Spinner reflected ten years later on the business decision and its impact stating, "With a gold record under her belt, a critically-acclaimed second album, a new hit single, strong sales, and an arena tour opening for Depeche Mode, Poe was well-established as an important influence. And then, poof—she disappeared."

== Hiatus and later career (2001–present) ==
In 2002, a story in the August issue of LA Weekly shed some light on the action of Atlantic to drop their rapidly rising artist with commitments and creative work underway. Poe had been signed to Atlantic in 1995 through Stevie Nicks' record label Modern Records. Amid the complex merger of Time Warner with AOL in 2000, it came to light that, in spite of the fact that Atlantic was responsible for providing all funding, marketing, publicity, radio promotion, tour support and distribution for the Poe project, Modern/FEI (not Atlantic) in its 1982 distribution deal with Atlantic, was awarded ownership of the masters of all Poe recordings. What this meant for Atlantic was that, by renewing Poe's contract, Atlantic had committed sizable resources to a project in which it would have a financial participation, but not an equity stake in Poe's past, present or future catalogue.

In November 2000, Atlantic/AOL Time Warner first chose to drop Modern/FEI, and as a result were contractually obligated to pay Modern/FEI an undisclosed amount of money, and effectively release themselves from any further fiduciary responsibilities to Modern/ FEI and/or Poe. This resulted in a pay-off for Modern/FEI and prematurely ended all printing, distribution, marketing, and promotion of Poe's second album Haunted. In exchange for these monies, Modern/FEI's agreed to give Atlantic a two-year grace period during which Modern/FEI agreed not to do anything commercially with any of Poe's master recordings, enabling Atlantic to sell off their stock of already produced copies of Haunted. As a result, Haunted received no further promotional support and the album faded from the market place.

In 2004, Modern/ FEI sold the Poe Masters for Hello and Haunted to Sheridan Square Music who merged in 2005 with V2 Records, which cataloged the Poe masters under a sub-label called IndieBlu. IndieBlu and Sheridan Square Music were acquired by Entertainment One in 2009.

In 2001, as Haunted was climbing the charts, Poe turned to a friend of her fiancé's father, Robert M. Edsel for legal advice. He advised her to retain the services of his firm's legal counsel, David Helfant on a professional basis. Edsel and Helfant told Poe that she could expect a settlement from FEI or Atlantic within a few months, and advised her to sever her relationship with her management firm and her accounting firm in order to avoid sharing a portion of her settlement. Poe understood that Edsel took over her business management, who over a year lent Poe $200,000 for living costs, professional expenses and repayment of debts, with a signed promissory note which indicated that if there was a default her current and future works would be eligible to be used for repayment. A settlement with Atlantic was never obtained, Poe's new management through Edsel and colleagues did not secure paying work, and the loan was defaulted upon. Consequently, Poe sued on the grounds that she had been represented by an unlicensed agency and therefore the agreement was void. Edsel kept Poe tied up in court, unable to release new music or perform professionally for a few years. What music Poe did release during that time was generally done under the pseudonym "Jane." Ultimately, the case was found in Poe's favour, voiding the contract but obliging her to repay the portion of the loan that was not used to pay for Edsel and colleagues’ services.

Poe was able to perform for charitable events during this period, and she collaborated on film soundtracks and continued to compose and write. Her previously released songs were also licensed for use in films and commercials.

=== Alan Wake II soundtrack, This Road ===
On September 12, 2012, Poe posted a one-minute song and video on a new mobile platform called PTCH; however, no announcement was made about an official release date. The video features a split narrative told across different frames on a single screen. The song, which repeats the line "And some say that it loops forever this road that I lose you on every time", was titled "September 30, 1955". The video later appeared on her YouTube channel.

Poe returned to the stage in 2014 for five shows at The Sayers Club in Los Angeles, during which she previewed a new song, "Not Jane".

Fashion designer Tom Ford showcased his 2015 Autumn/Winter women's wear collection to the beat of Poe's "Hey Pretty".

On October 1, 2018, Poe posted several cryptic teasers to her Instagram, suggesting new music was in the works. Among these posts was a short video of her gazing to the side and repeating the line "Once upon a time, there was a little boy who lived in a remote region of the earth, and from the day that he was born, until he turned twelve, he'd only ever heard one story, about a little boy, who lived in a remote region of the earth."

Five years later on October 17, 2023, Poe would post a one-minute long video to her YouTube channel, titled "This Window", and also opened her online store, linked from her official website. On October 19, she announced through another video titled "In the Dark Place", that she would be releasing a new song with Sam Lake, titled "This Road (AW)", on October 27, 2023, for the Alan Wake II video game. The song appeared on the game's official soundtrack, although separated into four tracks: "This Mirror is a Trap", "The Dark Chamber", "Falling Apart", and "The Beginning".

In a press release the week after the release of Alan Wake II and "This Road", Sam Lake reflected on the creative journey together with Poe, saying, "At some points we were so closely in sync that it got a bit scary. She was amazing to work with, a musical genius. A brilliant, brilliant artist. I feel the song perfectly captures all aspects of the world of the Dark Place where Alan Wake is trapped. In the disturbing dream-reality taking the shape of New York City, the song has in part the hazy, smoky, feel of a Film Noir nightclub, the aching longing the novelist Alan Wake feels toward Alice, his wife, as he tries to escape the nightmare and get back to her, the paranoid feel of being lost and having forgotten something vital. It’s all of this and more. It’s beautiful."

On October 1, 2024, Poe once again posted a cryptic teaser video to her YouTube channel, titled "I", in which she appears saying, "I went missing in 2001. I barely noticed, but you knew. You could feel it. My symptoms were abstract, most notable among them was my ability to utilize the word." On October 17, a limited edition 12" single of "This Road" became available for pre-order on Poe's online store, and was later released on October 31 with a new track, "6 Deep Breaths" as the B-side.

On December 13, 2024, Poe held a surprise private concert for fans in Los Angeles, where she performed "This Road" for the first time.

On December 5, 2025, Poe continued to tease new material with another cryptic YouTube video, titled "It Wasn't There", featuring Poe with her eyes shifting and multiplying, reciting a monologue of "not long after I went missing, the (static) came, they took a really really long time, examining me, measuring me, naming me. They had names for parts of me that I didn't even know existed. They measured those meticulously, and drew... conclusions. But there was one part of me that troubled them deeply. They didn't examine it. They didn't measure it. They didn't name it. They said it wasn't there." Another similar video was posted on April 7, 2026, titled "Not Feeling Anything". Poe appears examining her right hand, which slowly de-materializes, while her eyes track a moving circle across the screen. She says "It's not so bad, (reversed audio), but it's weird, not feeling anything."

== Charitable work ==
Poe is a supporter of the David Lynch Foundation, a charity which teaches Transcendental Meditation to children in underprivileged school districts. Poe has played at numerous fundraisers for the foundation, including a show with Donovan at the El Rey Theatre. She performed again for the foundation, along with Ellen DeGeneres and Russell Brand, at their Gala Fundraiser at the Los Angeles County Museum of Art on December 3, 2011.

To benefit UNICEF, Poe joined with a group of other notable music artists and celebrities recording their versions of John Lennon's song "Imagine" in 2014. This was at the invitation of Yoko Ono who gave permission for the use of Lennon's song for a musical collage, which became the launch of UNICEF's global campaign to celebrate the 25th anniversary of the Convention on the Rights of the Child. Poe received the title of UNICEF Goodwill Ambassador for her participation. She was joined by 56 performers in the "Imagine" video including will.i.am, Katy Perry, Nicole Scherzinger, David Guetta, Hugh Jackman, Yoko Ono, Angélique Kidjo, Craig David, Danny O'Donoghue, Mari Malek, Australian singer Cody Simpson and actors David Arquette, Eric Christian Olsen, Seth Green, Dianna Agron, Courteney Cox and Idris Elba, among others. Each artist's version forms part of a new remix by David Guetta that released on New Year's Eve 2014 with an app to enable individuals to record and add themselves to the video. Poe is at the time mark 2:46 on "Imagine" (UNICEF: World Version) published online by Universal Music India. The music video spotlights the 28 million children globally who have been driven from their homes due to conflict. World leaders received a preview of the video in September 2014 at the United Nations Summit on Migrants and Refugees in the UN General Hall. The World Version officially launched by UNICEF on September 23, 2016, with people from more than 140 countries.

== Discography ==
=== Studio albums ===
Year	Album details	Peak chart positions		Sales	Certifications (sales threshold)
Year	Album details	US	US Heat	Sales	Certifications (sales threshold)
1995	Hello: Release date: October 10, 1995; Label: Modern Records	71	4	US: 626,000	US: Gold
2000	Haunted: Release date: October 31, 2000; Label: Atlantic Records	115	—	US: 250,000	
"—" denotes releases that did not chart

=== Singles ===
Year	Title	Peak chart positions			Album
Year	Title	^{US Mod Rock}	^{US Dance}	^{US Adult Top 40}	Album
1995	"Angry Johnny"	7	—	—	Hello
1995	"Trigger Happy Jack (Drive By a Go-Go)"	27	—	—	Hello
1996	"Hello"	13	1	—	Hello
1998	"Today"	—	—	—	Great Expectations soundtrack
1998	"Rise and Shine"	—	—	—	Non-album single
1998	"Control"	—	—	—	Haunted
2000	"Walk the Walk"	—	—	—	Haunted
2001	"Hey Pretty"	13	—	30	Haunted
2001	"Wild"	—	—	—	Haunted
2024	"This Road"	—	—	—	Non-album single
"—" denotes releases that did not chart

=== Music videos ===
==== As lead artist ====
Year	Song	Director
1995	"Trigger Happy Jack (Drive By a Go-Go)"	Paul Andresen
1995	"Angry Johnny"	Paul Andresen
1996	"Hello"	Paul Andresen / Mark Z. Danielewski
2000	"Hey Pretty"	Matthew Rolston

==== Guest appearances ====
Year	Title	Artist	Ref.
2014	"Imagine" (UNICEF: World version)	Various	

== Poe remixes ==
- "Trigger Happy Jack (Drive By a Go Go)" 12 inch vinyl and CD Maxi Single,
1. Trigger Happy Jack: The Drive By Remix" by Steve Lyon
2. Trigger Happy Jack: The Psycho Demolition Mix" by Steve Lyon
3. Trigger Happy Jack: Instrumental" LP mix
4. Trigger Happy Jack: Poe Only" LP Mix.
- "Angry Johnny" Promo CD Single,
1. "Angry Johnny: The Band Mix."
- "Hello" Promo CD Single,
1. "Hello: Band Mix,"
2. "Hello" 12 " Vinyl and CD Maxi Single,
3. "Hello: E-Smoove Funk Mix" by, E-Smoove,
4. "Hello: Modern Mix" by, Edge Factor,
5. "Hello: Nevins Electronica Mix" by Jason Nevins,
6. "Hello: The Generator Mix by E-Smoove,
7. "Hello: The Edge Factor Mix" by, Edge Factor,
8. "Hello: Trial Dub Mix" by, Edge Factor.
- "Haunted" Promo CD Single,
1. "Haunted: The Chris Vrenna Mix."
- "Rise and Shine" CD Single with Gwen Stefani and Levar Halter,
1. "Rise and Shine: Gospel Mix,"
2. "Rise and Shine: Acoustic Mix,"
3. "Rise and Shine: All Levar."

== Additional professional projects ==
=== Video games ===
In October 1998, Poe appeared with actor Bruce Willis in the PlayStation video game Apocalypse. Poe plays Bruce Willis's ex-girlfriend, Mary Magdelene, who had been turned into the evil Plague—one of the Horsemen of Apocalypse. Clips of Poe performing on stage also play on screens in the game's environment. Poe also contributed an early version of the song "Control" to the soundtrack of Apocalypse.

In May 2010, Poe's song "Haunted" appeared in the ending of Episode 2 in the Remedy Entertainment game Alan Wake.

Poe's newest song in over a decade, "This Road", credited to her and Sam Lake, appears in Alan Wake 2.

=== Conjure One projects ===
In 2002, Poe co-wrote and performed "Center of the Sun" and "Make a Wish" for Conjure One's self-titled release on Nettwerk Records. "Center of the Sun" was featured in the film X-Men 2. A Special Edition 12-inch vinyl record and a CD single of the song were released in 2003, with remixes by Pete Lorimer – 29 Palms Remix, Junkie XL Remix, and Solarstone's Chilled-Out Remix.

In 2005, Poe co-wrote and performed "Endless Dream", "Extraordinary Way" and "One Word" for Conjure One's second album entitled Extraordinary Ways. On the original packaging, Poe was credited with the pseudonym "Jane" due to her legal limitations during that period. Also in 2005, a CD single and 12-inch vinyl records were released of "Extraordinary Way", which included remixes by Antillas and Low End Specialists.

=== Soundtracks and film work ===
1998

- Poe contributed the song "Today" to the soundtrack for the film Great Expectations. The album went Gold later that year.

1999

- Poe collaborated with Danny Elfman, contributing vocals to his score for the film Anywhere but Here. She contributed the song "Strange Wind" (co-written with Danny Elfman) to the film's soundtrack.
- Poe contributed her song "Hello" to serve as end title in the film Stir of Echoes.
- Poe contributed a cover of the Oklahoma! show tune "I Cain't Say No" to the soundtrack of the film Welcome to Woop Woop.

2000

- Poe performed a stylized dance choreography to her version of "Our Lips Are Sealed" (re-imagined as "My Lips Are Sealed") in the film Gossip.
- Poe's song "Haunted" was licensed for use as the end title of Book of Shadows: Blair Witch 2.

2002

- Poe's song "Center of the Sun" was licensed for use in the film X-Men 2. Credits are listed as Anne Danielewski, writer, and Poe, performer.

2008

- Poe provided backing vocals for the soundtrack of Repo! The Genetic Opera, notably in the songs "Legal Assassin", "We Started this Op'ra Shit!" (as the singing voice for the character of 'Single Mom') and "Things You See In a Graveyard".

2009

- Poe's song "Hey Pretty" was licensed for use in a Ford television commercial. The commercial aired during the Super Bowl and was aired repeatedly during American Idol (Season 8).

2010

- Poe's song "Haunted" was used in the video game Alan Wake.

2011

- Poe collaborated again with Danny Elfman on the score he wrote for Real Steel original motion picture score. Her vocals are featured in the songs "Why We're Here" and "Parkway Motel".

2014

- Poe's song "Hey Pretty" was featured by fashion designer Tom Ford while showcasing his 2015 Autumn/Winter women's wear collection at London Fashion Week on September 15, 2014, and at his premiere fashion show on the west coast on February 20, 2015, in Los Angeles.

2023

- Poe's song "This Road" was used in the video game Alan Wake 2.

2024

- Poe's song "6 Deep Breaths" was used in the Lake House DLC for Alan Wake 2.
