= Leah Randi =

American singer

- Born: Leah Rose Randi; September 11, 1970 (age 55); Los Angeles, California
- Genres: Alternative rock
- Occupations: Musician (bassist, singer)
- Instruments: Bass guitar, vocals
- Years active: 1995-present

Leah Rose Randi is an American bassist and vocalist. She has recorded or performed live with bands including Abandoned Pools, Front Line Assembly, Paradise Lost, Delerium, Conjure One and Pink.

== Background ==
Born Leah Rose Randi on September 11, 1970, in Los Angeles, she is the daughter of the musician Don Randi and Norma Waterman.

== Career ==
Randi has performed on Saturday Night Live, The Tonight Show and The Ellen DeGeneres Show as part of Pink's band, playing bass on songs such as "God Is a DJ". She also appeared in the music videos "The Remedy" and "Monster" by Abandoned Pools and "Last To Know" and "Try This Live" by Pink. Her vocal work on Front Line Assembly's 2004 album Civilization has been singled out for praise.

In May 2010, she joined fellow musicians Slash, Ace Frehley and Charlotte Caffey and Kathy Valentine of The Go-Go's, among other artists, for a performance benefiting the MusiCares Musicians Assistance Program.

== Discography ==
- Chris Poland – Rare Trax (2000)
- Abandoned Pools – Humanistic (2001)
- Delerium – Chimera (2003)
- Front Line Assembly – Civilization (2004)
- L'Âme Immortelle – Gezeiten (2004)
- Paradise Lost – Forever After (2005)
- Pink – Try This Live (DVD) (2005)
- Conjure One – Extraordinary Ways (2005)
- Delerium – Nuages du Monde (2006)
- Serena Ryder – If Your Memory Serves You Well (2007)
- Fauxliage – Fauxliage (2007)
- Paradise Lost – In Requiem (2007)
- Conjure One – Exilarch (2010)
- Delerium – Mythologie (2016)
