= Alex Blanc =

- Origin: Los Angeles, California, USA
- Genres: New wave, post-punk, dance-rock, art punk, experimental rock, pop rock
- Years active: 1980–1985
- Labels: Capitol Records, EMI

Alex Blanc was the stage name for Alex de Rafols while a member of The Nobodys, an American musical group based in Los Angeles in the 1980s. Having created the group with his brother, singer/songwriter Safeway Goya, the group independently wrote, produced and released a single, "Sex is a Bottomless Pit" on their self-founded label Whatever Records, and were subsequently signed to Capitol Records and EMI International, leading to a worldwide release of the album No Guarantees on August 8, 1984.

The first single release, "No Guarantees", was accompanied by a video, shot in Amsterdam, Berlin, and Los Angeles. It was used in Michael Apted's 1984 movie Firstborn, starring Peter Weller and Teri Garr, and in episode 27, "Buddies", of the television series Miami Vice.

"No Guarantees"
Audio sample from the album The Nobodys: No Guarantees
