= R. J.'s Latest Arrival =

American R&B and soul band

RJ's Latest Arrival
- Origin: Detroit, Michigan, United States
- Genres: R&B, soul
- Years active: 1979–1990, 2023-
- Labels: Buddah, Atlantic, EMI Manhattan
- Past members: R. J. Rice; DeDe Leitta; Craig Lane; Paul Munro; Dean DiPierro; Paris Reese; Rudy "Famous" Maldonado; Ericko Nelson; Robin Marie

R. J.'s Latest Arrival is an American R&B, dance, and soul music band from Detroit, Michigan, United States, who formed in the late 1970s and reached the peak of their popularity in the mid-1980s. They released their debut self-titled debut album in 1979. In 1984, they scored one of their first big hits with "Shackles," featured on their Harmony album. Drummer Rudy "Famous" Maldonado left the band during The Shackles Tour in 1984, although he was featured in the video for the follow-up single, "Harmony." The group scored their biggest hit single in 1988 with "Off The Hook (With Your Love)." They scored other moderate hits on the US Billboard R&B chart throughout the 1980s. The group later became more based in traditional R&B and soul music, but broke up in 1990. The group reunited in 2023 for a new song called One Step at a Time featuring Slum Village.

Rice went on to form Barak Records, an independent hip-hop record label based in Detroit. The label's most notable acts were Slum Village and SMD. Rice also produced the majority of the album Hello by singer-songwriter Poe, including the first single "Angry Johnny". Rice also produced Taja Sevelle's 1997 album, Toys of Vanity.

Paul Michael Munro continued in the entertainment business creating the entertainment/record company Zycron Media and Zycron Records, creating, producing and hosting the Hotspots television show airing on NBC and CBS affiliates.

== Partial discography ==
=== Albums ===
- R.J.'s Latest Arrival (1979)
- R.J.'s Latest Arrival [second self-titled album] (1982)
- Harmony (1984)
- R.J.'s Latest Arrival [third self-titled album] (1985)
- Hold On (1986)
- Truly Yours (1988)
- Tangled in Love (1989)
- Advise Me to Puddy Snacks: The Best of RJ's Latest Arrival (1996)
- One Step at a Time feat. Slum Village [Single] (2023)
