= Tears from the Moon =

Single by Conjure One featuring Sinéad O'Connor
- Released: 2002
- Studio: Stanford Street Studios (Santa Monica, CA)
- Genre: Trance; progressive house
- Length: 4:18
- Label: Nettwerk
- Songwriters: Kyoto Peggy Baertsoen; Rick Nowels; Billy Steinberg
- Producer: Dominic Rennie

Audio
- "Tears From The Moon" on YouTube

"Tears from the Moon" is a music single by Canadian electronic music project Conjure One featuring vocals from Irish singer-songwriter Sinéad O'Connor. The song hit number one at World Dance/Trance Top 20 Singles and World Soundtracks/OST Top 20 Singles.

It was originally written by Kyoko Peggy Baertsoen, Rick Nowels and Billy Steinberg. Baertsoen was a member of the Belgian group Lunascape and the song was originally featured on their release Reflecting Seyelence.

Along with being featured in the "Charmed: The Final Chapter" soundtrack to the show Charmed, one of its remixes was featured in the Lara Croft: Tomb Raider – The Cradle of Life soundtrack.

On 17 August 2022, the anamé remix was released.

== Notable remixes ==
- Tiësto In Search of Sunrise Remix (8:13)
- Robbie Rivera Mix (8:44)
- Carmen Rizzo Stateside West Chill Out Mix (6:09)
- Hybrid Twisted On The Terrace Mix (9:51)
- Hybrid Twisted On The Terrace Mix V.2 (7:40)
- Billy Gillies Extended Remix (5:42)
- anamé Remix (4:51)
- anamé Extended Mix (8:44)
