= Keith and The Girl =

Comedy podcast

- KATG Show logo with a split between hosts representing the end of their romantic relationship.
- Genre: comedy

Cast and voices
- Hosted by: Keith Malley and Chemda

Publication
- Original release: March 8, 2005
- Updates: on-air weekdays

Keith and The Girl, abbreviated as KATG, is a comedy podcast that began on March 7, 2005. It is hosted by Keith Malley and Chemda Khalili in Queens, New York. The hosts are known for interacting with their audience live via chat rooms, web cam and phone calls. In the show, Malley and Khalili discuss their lives and current events in humorous and unrestrained fashion. The show's tagline is "Keith and his ex-girlfriend talk shit".

== Acceptance ==
In June 2008, the show had over 50,000 listeners and in excess of 1 million monthly downloads. It has also received multiple blogosphere podcast-specific awards. The show boasts over 40,000 website forum members.

== Show features ==
Some of the regular features of Keith and The Girl include inviting guests to co-host shows; live shows (using a Shoutcast feed); and the self-explanatory, Strange News.

== Recurring themes ==
"Bear vs Beer"
Keith Malley discusses his unusual accent.

Some frequent general topics of the show include: "New York stories:" happenings in New York City (includes stories from Malley's early life working as a waiter after arriving from Somerset, Pennsylvania); "HUAR" (Humans United Against Robots): news and discussions of advancing robot technologies and their implications

=== Keith and The Girl TV & VIP ===
Keith and The Girl TV began in late November 2007. It is a branch off of the original format of an hour to an hour and a half of talk and is focused more on short 3–5 minute comedy skits that usually feature a topic or guest of the previous week's show or news. Topics have included internet phenomena such as 2 Girls 1 Cup and the Cinnamon Challenge, to the inner workings of the main KATG show. Like the show it was inspired by, KATG–TV frequently ranks within the top 5 on Podcast Alley. The show has since been merged into the main KATG feed and then further merged into the VIP paywall.

In September 2011, Keith and The Girl launched KATG VIP, a paid subscription program that opened up episodes from the back catalog as well as brand new, exclusive forms of content.

== Awards ==
- Podcasting Hall of Fame inductees 2018
- Blogger's Choice Awards 2008 – Best Video Blogger (Winner)
- Podcast Awards 2007 – Peoples Choice (Winner)
- Podcast Awards 2007 – Best Mature Podcast (Winner)
- Blogger's Choice Awards 2007 – Best Podcast (Winner)

== Books ==
What Do We Do Now? Keith and The Girl’s Smart Answers To Your Stupid Relationship Questions is Keith and The Girl's relationship book, which was released on March 9, 2010.

In 2014, Keith and The Girl released The Ultimate Podcasting Guide as a "how-to" for starting and succeeding in podcasting.

== Keith Malley ==
Malley (born April 15, 1974), in addition to the podcast, does stand-up comedy once a year. Malley appeared in the independent film, She's Crushed (2009).

=== Malley comedy discography ===
- Coming of Age (2004)
- Children's Party Songs (2005)
- Happy to Serve You (2006)
- Point / Counterpoint (2007)
- Sue Everybody (2008)
- Culture Shock (2009)
- Can You Imagine? (2010)
- Stay Inside (2011)
- State of the Union (2012)
- Good Clean Fun: The Very Best of Keith Malley (2013)
- God Made Me: The Very Worst of Keith Malley, Vol. 1 (2014)
- God Made Me: The Very Worst of Keith Malley, Vol. 2 (2015)
- A Future to Believe In (2016)
- AWAKE (2017)
- Drip Drip (2018)
- I'm Dating Your Mom (2019)
- Nice Try, Tricksters (2023)

=== Twentieth Century Fox Film Corporation v. Keith Malley ===
Anticipating a future Simpsons movie, in 1999 Malley registered "TheSimpsonsMovie.com" as an act of cybersquatting. In 2007, the year of The Simpsons Movie's release, Malley rejected a $300(U.S.) offer by Twentieth Century Fox for the domain name. Twentieth Century Fox took its complaint to the World Intellectual Property Organization, and subsequently paid Malley an undisclosed amount for the domain name.
