= Modern Records (1980) =

Defunct American record label cofounded by Stevie Nicks

- Founded: 1980
- Founder: Stevie Nicks; Danny Goldberg; Paul Fishkin
- Defunct: 1999
- Status: Inactive
- Distributor(s): Atlantic; WEA; EMI
- Genre: Rock; pop
- Location: Los Angeles, California
- Official website: Modern Records album discography from BSN Pubs.

Modern Records was a record label founded in 1980 by Stevie Nicks, Danny Goldberg, and Paul Fishkin. Its logo clearly stated the founding year to avoid confusion with the earlier Modern Records. The label had a distribution deal with Atlantic Records in the United States (also had international distribution with WEA and EMI) and Nicks was the biggest artist on the label, with other artists such as Joey Wilson, Venice, Sandy Stewart, Poe, and Natalie Cole also having records released on the label. Modern Records folded in 1999. The record label was born out of necessity due to Warner Brothers refusing to sign Nicks as a solo act.

== Notable signed artists ==
- Stevie Nicks
- Rick Vito
- Sandy Stewart
- Joey Wilson
- Jah Malla
- Poe
- Natalie Cole
- Venice
