= Cat Dancer =

Studio album by Sandy Stewart
- Released: 1984
- Length: 38:27
- Label: Modern
- Producer: Beau Hill; Gordon Perry; Jimmy Iovine

Cat Dancer is the debut and only solo album by American singer-songwriter and musician Sandy Stewart, which was released by Modern in 1984.

Cat Dancer failed to reach the Billboard 200, but reached number eight on the Bubbling Under the Top LPs chart. "Saddest Victory" was released as the album's only single.

The album received a CD release by Wounded Bird Records in 2009.

== Background ==
Speaking of the album, Stewart told The Spokesman-Review in 1984, "The album is so depressing, like 'Oh God, he left me; oh God, I don't have a boyfriend.' I think that's because I tend to write more when I'm depressed. All my songs tend to sound too sad, and I'm very happy right now."

"I Pretend" is a duet with Stevie Nicks, who also provided backing vocals on "Cat Dancers" and "Get My Way". Stewart and Nicks first collaborated on Nicks' 1983 solo album The Wild Heart. On Nicks' album, Stewart provided keyboards, piano and backing vocals across six tracks. She also co-wrote three tracks, including the US hit singles "If Anyone Falls" and "Nightbird", the latter being a duet between Nicks and Stewart.

== Critical reception ==
Professional ratings
Review scores
Source	Rating
AllMusic	3/5 stars
The Philadelphia Inquirer	3/5 stars
Red Deer Advocate	2.5/4 stars

On its release, Jim Bohen of the Daily Record wrote, "As you might expect, Stewart shares plenty with Nicks stylistically. Not only is her singing similar, but her writing tends toward dark romantic ballads with intensely personal, diary-like lyrics. But Cat Dancer gradually reveals plenty of personality of its own." He praised the instrumentation for "sound[ing] satisfyingly full and dynamic" and noted that Hill and Munday contribute "plenty of electric backbone". Jack Lloyd of The Philadelphia Inquirer stated, "Stewart's edge is that she writes some good songs, most of which fall into the love-lost category, which gets to be a drag over the long haul. The voice is adequate, though, if not spectacular, and the tunes are a notch or two above average."

Akiko Mary Mitsui of The Boston Globe commented, "Stewart's songs retell tales of broken hearts, but pleasant melodic arrangements and varying guitar power save the songs from sounding repetitious. All in all, an impressive first release from a promising pop singer." Greg Kennedy of the Red Deer Advocate wrote, "Sandy's middle-of-the-road rock is enjoyable, but hardly good enough backing for her earthy, sometimes sultry voice. Cat Dancer, while a pleasant, inoffensive LP, only whets the appetite for Sandy's next album."

== Track listing ==
All tracks are written by Sandy Stewart except where noted

No.	Title	Writer(s)	Length
1.	"Cat Dancers"	Stewart, Beau Hill	4:50
2.	"Get My Way"		4:06
3.	"Think of Me"		4:28
4.	"Living End"	Stewart, Hill	3:50
5.	"Saddest Victory"		4:10
6.	"Not Like the Others"		4:22
7.	"I Pretend"		3:42
8.	"Mind Over Matter"		4:04
9.	"Leave It All Behind"	Stewart, David Munday, Amanda Blue, Lyn Robinson	4:44

== Personnel ==
- Sandy Stewart – lead vocals (all tracks), backing vocals (tracks 1–3, 5–9), keyboards (all tracks), drum synth (track 2), guitar (track 4)
- David Munday – guitar (all tracks), marimba (track 2), backing vocals (track 2), keyboards (tracks 3, 9)
- Beau Hill – synth bass (tracks 1–6, 9), keyboard solo (track 1), backing vocals (tracks 1, 5, 7), drum synth (tracks 2–3), keyboards (tracks 3–4, 8), guitar (track 4), synth chimes (track 5), synth percussion (track 6)
- Roger Tausz – bass guitar (tracks 6–9)
- Stevie Nicks – backing vocals (tracks 1–2, 7), lead vocals (track 7)
- Amanda Blue – backing vocals (tracks 3, 8–9)
- Lori Perry – backing vocals (track 6)
- Michael Spencer – drums (tracks 1, 6–9)
- Parker Bradfield Smith – percussion (tracks 1, 8), congas (track 2), drums (track 4), drum synth (track 4)
- Bobbye Hall – percussion (track 3)
- Anton Fig – drums (track 5)
- Dave Bluefield – DMX programming (track 3)
- Jimmy Iovine – motif (track 5)

Production

- Beau Hill – producer (all tracks), engineer (all tracks), mixing (all tracks)
- Gordon Perry – producer (tracks 1–4, 6–9)
- Jimmy Iovine – producer (track 5), executive producer
- Shelly Yakus – engineer (tracks 3, 5), assistant mixer (all tracks)
- Don Smith, Thom Cassetta – additional engineering
- Robin Lain, Dennis Sagar, Gary Lubow – assistant mixers
- Jim Faraci – assistant mixer, recording assistant
- Crif Smiuf – assistant mixer, recording assistant
- Tom Gondolf – additional engineering, recording assistant
- Ray Leonard, Rubin Ayala, Tom Cook, Mitch Gibson, Bill Wade, Roger Tausz, Stuart Furusho, Bobby Gerber – recording assistants
- Greg Fulginiti – mastering
- Herbert Worthington III – photography, art direction

== Charts ==
Chart (1984)	Peak position
US Bubbling Under the Top LPs (Billboard)	8
