= 24 Karat Gold Tour =

2016–17 concert tour by Stevie Nicks

- Tour by Stevie Nicks
- Associated album: 24 Karat Gold: Songs from the Vault
- Start date: October 25, 2016
- End date: November 24, 2017
- Legs: 4
- No. of shows: 55 in North America; 1 in Europe; 11 in Oceania; 67 in total

Stevie Nicks concert chronology
- In Your Dreams Tour (2011–12); 24 Karat Gold Tour (2016–17); ...

The 24 Karat Gold Tour was the seventeenth concert tour by American singer-songwriter and Fleetwood Mac vocalist Stevie Nicks. The tour was joined by special guest The Pretenders and it was launched in support of Nicks' 2014 studio album 24 Karat Gold: Songs from the Vault. The tour officially began on October 25, 2016 in Phoenix, Arizona at the Talking Stick Resort Arena, and it concluded on November 24, 2017 in Dunedin at the Forsyth Barr Stadium, lasting over one year.

== Background ==
On September 6, 2016, Nicks announced a leg of 27 shows in North American with The Pretenders in support of her 2014 studio album, 24 Karat Gold: Songs from the Vault. Due to demand more dates were gradually added, including an entire second North America leg which was announced on December 5, 2016 that extended the tour into 2017. In 2017 Nicks also performed at various festivals in North America and appeared at British Summer Time in London, which was the sole European date of the tour. On August 10, 2017, Nicks announced a last leg of shows with The Pretenders in Australia and New Zealand. The final leg took place in November 2017 and concluded with a show at Forsyth Barr Stadium.

In July 2020, rumors began to spread about a possible concert video release after an official 24 Karat Gold Tour film screening event was posted online before being quickly deleted by cinema sites, possibly awaiting official announcement from Nicks' team. The listing read: "A concert performance by the woman with one of the most recognizable voices in music history. Stevie's string of hits songs as a solo artist and as a part of rock legends Fleetwood Mac has provided the soundtrack of our lives. Filmed over the last two shows of her solo tour including hits Edge of Seventeen, Rhiannon & Landslide and including cinema exclusive content of Stevie discussing personal moments with Tom Petty, Prince. (Subtitles: English, German, French, Italian) The event comes with the full support of the Stevie Nicks and the Fleetwood Mac teams and record labels." It is further speculated that film screenings were ultimately cancelled due to the ongoing COVID-19 pandemic. Shows in March 2017 were also professionally filmed and recorded according to concert-goers.

On September 10, 2020, it was announced that a live album of the 24 Karat Gold tour is to be released on vinyl, exclusively through Barnes & Noble on November 20, 2020.

== Set list ==
This set list is representative of the show on October 25, 2016, in Phoenix, Arizona. It does not represent all shows throughout the tour.

1. "Gold and Braid"
2. "If Anyone Falls"
3. "Stop Draggin' My Heart Around"
4. "Belle Fleur"
5. "Outside the Rain"
6. "Dreams"
7. "Wild Heart"
8. "Bella Donna"
9. "Annabel Lee"
10. "Enchanted"
11. "New Orleans"
12. "Starshine"
13. "Moonlight (A Vampire's Dream)"
14. "Stand Back"
15. "Crying in the Night"
16. "If You Were My Love"
17. "Gold Dust Woman"
18. "Edge of Seventeen"
  Encore
19. "Rhiannon"
20. "Leather and Lace"

Notes

- At multiple shows, Chrissie Hynde of The Pretenders joined Nicks to perform "Stop Draggin' My Heart Around".
- Starting on November 19, 2016, "Gypsy" was added to the tour's set list after "Belle Fleur".
- Starting on November 29, 2016, "Landslide" was added to the tour's set list as the final song, replacing "Leather and Lace".
- "Dreams" and "Outside the Rain" were not performed from November 19, 2016 to November 2, 2017, except on July 7, 2017.
- "Annabel Lee" was only performed at the first five shows of the tour.

== Shows ==
List of concerts showing date, city, country, venue, opening act, tickets sold, number of available tickets and amount of gross revenue
| Date | City | Country | Venue | Opening act(s) | Attendance | Revenue |
North America
| October 25, 2016 | Phoenix | United States | Talking Stick Resort Arena | The Pretenders | —N/a | —N/a |
| October 27, 2016 | Denver | United States | Pepsi Center | The Pretenders | —N/a | —N/a |
| October 29, 2016 | Houston | United States | Toyota Center | The Pretenders | 8,440 / 9,306 (91%) | $970,641 |
| October 30, 2016 | Dallas | United States | American Airlines Center | The Pretenders | 10,299 / 10,299 (100%) | $1,930,988 |
| November 2, 2016 | Tampa | United States | Amalie Arena | The Pretenders | 7,930 / 9,379 (85%) | $823,927 |
| November 4, 2016 | Sunrise | United States | BB&T Center | The Pretenders | 7,724 / 8,856 (87%) | $752,946 |
| November 6, 2016 | Atlanta | United States | Philips Arena | The Pretenders | —N/a | —N/a |
| November 7, 2016 | Nashville | United States | Bridgestone Arena | The Pretenders | 12,300 / 12,300 (100%) | $939,129 |
| November 10, 2016 | Charlotte | United States | Spectrum Center | The Pretenders | 8,152 / 8,152 (100%) | $1,597,260 |
| November 12, 2016 | Columbia | United States | Colonial Life Arena | The Pretenders | 9,121 / 11,347 (80%) | $791,848 |
| November 14, 2016 | Washington, D.C. | United States | Capital One Arena | The Pretenders | 7,678 / 11,872 (65%) | $836,038 |
| November 15, 2016 | Boston | United States | TD Garden | The Pretenders | 10,396 / 12,176 (85%) | $1,117,205 |
| November 19, 2016 | Bethlehem | United States | Sands Bethlehem Event Center | The Pretenders | —N/a | —N/a |
| November 20, 2016 | Philadelphia | United States | Wells Fargo Center | The Pretenders | 11,304 / 12,773 (88%) | $1,119,543 |
| November 23, 2016 | Grand Rapids | United States | Van Andel Arena | The Pretenders | 9,982 / 9,982 (100%) | $772,272 |
| November 25, 2016 | Uncasville | United States | Mohegan Sun Arena | The Pretenders | 7,431 / 7,431 (100%) | $627,559 |
| November 27, 2016 | Auburn Hills | United States | The Palace of Auburn Hills | The Pretenders | 7,809 / 10,015 (78%) | $687,845 |
| November 29, 2016 | Toronto | Canada | Air Canada Centre | The Pretenders | 10,202 / 10,202 (100%) | $848,227 |
| December 1, 2016 | New York City | United States | Madison Square Garden | The Pretenders | 15,167 / 15,167 (100%) | $1,575,376 |
| December 3, 2016 | Chicago | United States | United Center | The Pretenders | 14,338 / 14,338 (100%) | $1,324,954 |
| December 5, 2016 | Lincoln | United States | Pinnacle Bank Arena | The Pretenders | —N/a | —N/a |
| December 6, 2016 | Saint Paul | United States | Xcel Energy Center | The Pretenders | 9,600 / 15,661 (61%) | $895,786 |
| December 9, 2016 | Vancouver | Canada | Rogers Arena | The Pretenders | —N/a | —N/a |
| December 11, 2016 | Seattle | United States | KeyArena | The Pretenders | 12,115 / 15,224 (80%) | $1,035,099 |
| December 13, 2016 | Sacramento | United States | Golden 1 Center | The Pretenders | 10,363 / 10,819 (96%) | $1,017,250 |
| December 14, 2016 | San Jose | United States | SAP Center | The Pretenders | 9,350 / 9,792 (95%) | $987,368 |
| December 17, 2016 | Las Vegas | United States | Park Theater | The Pretenders | 5,040 / 5,040 (100%) | $792,903 |
| December 18, 2016 | Inglewood | United States | The Forum | The Pretenders | 14,210 / 14,210 (100%) | $1,379,531 |
| February 23, 2017 | Reno | United States | Reno Events Center | The Pretenders | 6,700/ 6,700 (100%) | $672,550 |
| February 25, 2017 | Salt Lake City | United States | Vivint Smart Home Arena | The Pretenders | 10,860 / 10,860 (100%) | $928,315 |
| February 28, 2017 | Portland | United States | Moda Center | The Pretenders | 8,720 / 9,932 (88%) | $873,708 |
| March 2, 2017 | San Diego | United States | Viejas Arena | The Pretenders | 8,511 / 8,996 (95%) | $954,032 |
| March 6, 2017 | Tulsa | United States | BOK Center | The Pretenders | 7,269 / 8,793 (83%) | $671,485 |
| March 8, 2017 | Memphis | United States | FedExForum | The Pretenders | 6,390 / 8,334 (77%) | $626,954 |
| March 10, 2017 | Bossier City | United States | CenturyLink Center | The Pretenders | 6,976 / 8,173 (85%) | $671,024 |
| March 12, 2017 | Austin | United States | Frank Erwin Center | The Pretenders | 10,378 / 10,378 (100%) | $1,121,091 |
| March 15, 2017 | New Orleans | United States | Smoothie King Center | The Pretenders | 12,072 / 12,288 (98%) | $1,096,670 |
| March 17, 2017 | Columbus | United States | Nationwide Arena | The Pretenders | 12,160 / 12,425 (98%) | $1,208,178 |
| March 19, 2017 | Raleigh | United States | PNC Arena | The Pretenders | 8,624 / 9,076 (95%) | $772,668 |
| March 21, 2017 | Orlando | United States | Amway Center | The Pretenders | 7,585 / 7,821 (97%) | $748,056 |
| March 23, 2017 | Jacksonville | United States | Jacksonville Veterans Memorial Arena | The Pretenders | 9,171 / 9,912 (93%) | $907,665 |
| March 25, 2017 | Charlottesville | United States | John Paul Jones Arena | The Pretenders | 7,854 / 8,716 (90%) | $805,029 |
| March 26, 2017 | Baltimore | United States | Royal Farms Arena | The Pretenders | 7,526 / 8,900 (85%) | $679,115 |
| March 29, 2017 | Indianapolis | United States | Bankers Life Fieldhouse | The Pretenders | 8,283 / 9,166 (90%) | $764,745 |
| March 31, 2017 | Pittsburgh | United States | PPG Paints Arena | The Pretenders | 13,516 / 13,799 (98%) | $1,133,242 |
| April 2, 2017 | Newark | United States | Prudential Center | The Pretenders | 9,924 / 10,462 (95%) | $997,737 |
| April 5, 2017 | Manchester | United States | SNHU Arena | The Pretenders | 8,121 / 8,847 (92%) | $813,792 |
| April 6, 2017 | Uniondale | United States | Nassau Veterans Memorial Coliseum | The Pretenders | 7,780 / 8,287 (94%) | $843,645 |
Europe
| July 9, 2017 (Note: The show on July 9, 2017 in London was part of British Summer Time.) | London | United Kingdom | Hyde Park | —N/a | —N/a | —N/a |
North America
| August 23, 2017 | Green Bay | United States | Resch Center | Vanessa Carlton | 5,841 / 5,841 (100%) | $644,795 |
| August 25, 2017 (Note: The show on August 25, 2017 in Falcon Heights was part of the Minnesota State Fair.) | Falcon Heights | United States | Minnesota State Fair Grandstand | Vanessa Carlton | —N/a | —N/a |
| September 9, 2017 (Note: The shows on September 9 and 10, 2017 in Highland Park were part of the Ravinia Festival.) | Highland Park | United States | The Pavilion | —N/a | —N/a | —N/a |
| September 10, 2017 | Highland Park | United States | The Pavilion | —N/a | —N/a | —N/a |
| September 13, 2017 | St. Charles | United States | Family Arena | Vanessa Carlton | —N/a | —N/a |
| September 15, 2017 | Youngstown | United States | Covelli Centre | Vanessa Carlton | 5,837 / 6,438 (91%) | $548,096 |
| September 24, 2017 (Note: The show on September 24, 2017 in Louisville was part of the Bourbon and Beyond Festival.) | Louisville | United States | Louisville Champions Park | —N/a | —N/a | —N/a |
Oceania
| November 2, 2017 | Perth | Australia | Perth Arena | The Pretenders | 9,402 / 9,402 (100%) | $908,583 |
| November 4, 2017 | Adelaide | Australia | Botanic Park | The Pretenders | —N/a | —N/a |
| November 7, 2017 | Sydney | Australia | ICC Sydney Theatre | The Pretenders | 13,798 / 13,798 (100%) | $1,194,260 |
| November 8, 2017 | Sydney | Australia | ICC Sydney Theatre | The Pretenders | 13,798 / 13,798 (100%) | $1,194,260 |
| November 11, 2017 | Hunter Valley | Australia | Bimbadgen Estate | The Pretenders; Ali Barter | —N/a | —N/a |
| November 12, 2017 | Mount Cotton | Australia | Sirromet Wines | The Pretenders; Ali Barter | —N/a | —N/a |
| November 16, 2017 | Melbourne | Australia | Rod Laver Arena | The Pretenders | 8,925 / 8,925 (100%) | $940,090 |
| November 18, 2017 | Yarra Valley | Australia | Rochford Wines | The Pretenders; Ali Barter | —N/a | —N/a |
| November 20, 2017 | Auckland | New Zealand | Spark Arena | The Pretenders | —N/a | —N/a |
| November 21, 2017 | Auckland | New Zealand | Spark Arena | The Pretenders | —N/a | —N/a |
| November 24, 2017 | Dunedin | New Zealand | Forsyth Barr Stadium | The Pretenders | —N/a | —N/a |
| Total | | | | | — | — |

== Personnel ==
- Stevie Nicks – vocals, tambourine
- Waddy Wachtel – guitars, musical director, backup vocals
- Ricky Peterson – hammond organ
- Scott Crago – drums
- Drew Hester – drums
- Darrell Smith – grand piano
- Al Ortiz – bass
- Carlos Rios – guitars
- Marilyn "Minnie" Martin – backup vocals
- Sharon Celani – backup vocals
