= Once Bitten =

Once Bitten may refer to:

== Music ==
- Once Bitten (Annabel Lamb album) (1983)
- Once Bitten (The Snakes album) (1998)
- Once Bitten (Great White album)
- "Once Bitten, Twice Shy", an Ian Hunter song from the 1975 album Ian Hunter, later covered by Great White
- "Once bitten twice shy", a Vesta Williams song from the 1986 debut album Vesta

== Film and TV ==
- Once Bitten (1932 film), a 1932 British comedy film starring Richard Cooper
- Once Bitten (1985 film), a 1985 American horror comedy film starring Jim Carrey
- Once Bitten Soundtrack, the soundtrack released to go along with the 1985 film Once Bitten
- "Once Bitten" (SpongeBob SquarePants), a 2006 episode of the cartoon series SpongeBob SquarePants
- "Once Bitten" (Archer), a 2013 episode of the cartoon series Archer
- Once Bitten (Family Guy), an episode of Family Guy
- "Once Bitten, Twice Shy" (Ninjago: Masters of Spinjitzu), an episode of Ninjago: Masters of Spinjitzu

== Literature ==
- Once Bitten, Twice Shy, a novel in the Jaz Parks series by Jennifer Rardin.

== Theatre ==
- Once Bitten, English title of Le Procès Veauradieux, an 1875 farce by Alfred Hennequin and Alfred Delacour
