= Dancing with the Stars (Australian TV series) season 6 =

Dancing with the Stars
- Season 6
- Hosted by: Daryl Somers; Sonia Kruger
- Judges: Todd McKenney; Paul Mercurio; Helen Richey; Mark Wilson
- Celebrity winner: Kate Ceberano
- Professional winner: John Paul Collins
- No. of episodes: 10

Release
- Original network: Seven Network
- Original release: 20 February – 1 May 2007

Season chronology
- ← Previous; Season 5 Next → Season 7

The sixth season of the Australian Dancing with the Stars premiered on 20 February 2007. Daryl Somers and Sonia Kruger returned as hosts, while Todd McKenney, Paul Mercurio, Helen Richey, and Mark Wilson returned as judges.

Singer Kate Ceberano and John-Paul Collins were announced as the winners on 1 May 2007, while radio personality Fifi Box and Paul Green finished in second place.

== Couples ==
This season featured ten celebrity contestants.

Celebrity	Notability	Professional partner	Status
Wendell Sailor	NRL player	Linda De Nicola	Eliminated 1st on 27 February 2007
Kimberley Davies	Neighbours actress	Paul Zaidman	Eliminated 2nd on 6 March 2007
Naomi Robson	Former Today Tonight presenter	Steven Grace	Eliminated 3rd on 13 March 2007
Todd Woodbridge	Tennis player	Emily Reilly	Eliminated 4th on 20 March 2007
Tatiana Grigorieva	Olympic pole vaulter	Brendan Humphreys	Eliminated 5th on 27 March 2007
David Graham	Big Brother Australia 2006 housemate	Eliza Campagna	Eliminated 6th on 10 April 2007
Jamie Durie	Television gardener & garden designer	Amanda Garner	Eliminated 7th on 17 April 2007
Tim Campbell	Home and Away actor	Natalie Lowe	Eliminated 8th on 24 April 2007
Fifi Box	Radio personality	Paul Green	Runners-up on 1 May 2007
Kate Ceberano	Singer & actress	John-Paul Collins	Winners on 1 May 2007

== Scoring chart ==
The highest score each week is indicated in bold green with a dagger (†), while the lowest score each week is indicated in italicized red with a double-dagger (‡).

Color key:

Winners
Runners-up
Bottom two
Eliminated

Dancing with the Stars (season 6) - Weekly scores
Couple	Pl.	Week										
Couple	Pl.	1 (Note: The couples were scored on a 50-point scale due to the presence of a guest judge.)	2	1+2	3	4	5	6	7	8	9	10
Kate & John-Paul	1st	29	**46**†	75	32	**36**†	30	30+30=60	34 (Note: This couple was in the bottom two, but was not eliminated.)	35+35=**70**†	39+34=**73**†	36+37+40=113‡ (Note: This couple finished in first place.)
Fifi & Paul G.	2nd	31	37	68	34	31	32	30+31=61	35	33+35=68	28+33=61‡	38+38+38=**114**† (Note: This couple finished in second place.)
Tim & Natalie	3rd	**41**†	43	**84**†	34	32	**35**†	39+34=**73**†	33	36+34=**70**†	37+35=72 (Note: This couple was eliminated.)	
Jamie & Amanda	4th	32	29	61	31	24	31	25+34=59	**36**†	32+32=64‡		
David & Eliza	5th	18‡	27	45‡	19‡	18‡	10‡	4+22=26‡	24‡			
Tatiana & Brendan	6th	39	35	74	30	33	26	28+26=54				
Todd & Emily	7th	39	35	74	**35**†	28	27					
Naomi & Steven	8th	26	29	55	21	21						
Kimberley & Paul Z.	9th	29	29	58	29							
Wendell & Linda	10th	30	25‡	55								

== Weekly scores ==
Unless indicated otherwise, individual judges scores in the chart below (given in parentheses) are listed in this order from left to right: Todd McKenney, Helen Richey, Paul Mercurio, Mark Wilson.

=== Week 1 ===
Individual judges scores in the chart below (given in parentheses) are listed in this order from left to right: Todd, Helen, Paul, Mark, Bruno.

Bruno Tonioli appeared as a guest judge.

Couples performed either the cha-cha-cha or the quickstep. Couples are listed in the order they performed.

Couple	Scores	Dance	Music
Wendell & Linda	30 (6, 6, 6, 6, 6)	Cha-cha-cha	"Rock This Party (Everybody Dance Now)" — Bob Sinclar
Tatiana & Brendan	39 (8, 8, 7, 8, 8)	Quickstep	"It Don't Mean a Thing (If It Ain't Got That Swing)" — Joe Loss
David & Eliza	18 (2, 4, 4, 4, 4)	Cha-cha-cha	"Summer Rain" — Slinkee Minx
Tim & Natalie	41 (8, 8, 8, 8, 9)	Quickstep	"Happy Feet" — from Shall We Dance?
Kimberley & Paul	29 (5, 5, 6, 6, 7)	Cha-cha-cha	"I Need to Know" — Marc Anthony
Todd & Emily	39 (8, 7, 8, 8, 8)	Quickstep	"The Lady Is a Tramp" — Shirley Bassey
Kate & John-Paul	29 (6, 6, 6, 5, 6)	Quickstep	"Lust for Life" — Iggy Pop
Fifi & Paul	31 (7, 6, 6, 6, 6)	Cha-cha-cha	"Walkin' on the Sun" — Smash Mouth
Naomi & Steven	26 (5, 5, 5, 5, 6)	Quickstep	"In the Mood" — from Swing!
Jamie & Amanda	32 (6, 6, 6, 7, 7)	Cha-cha-cha	"Need You Tonight" — INXS

=== Week 2 ===
Bruno Tonioli appeared as a guest judge.

Couples performed either the jive or the tango. Couples are listed in the order they performed.

Couple	Scores	Dance	Music	Result
Todd & Emily	35 (8, 7, 6, 7, 7)	Jive	"Great Balls of Fire" — Jerry Lee Lewis	Safe
Kimberley & Paul	29 (5, 6, 5, 6, 7)	Tango	"Olympic Gold Tango" — Casa Musica	Bottom two
Tim & Natalie	43 (9, 8, 8, 9, 9)	Jive	"Land of a Thousand Dances" — Wilson Pickett	Safe
Wendell & Linda	25 (5, 5, 6, 4, 5)	Tango	"Electric Tango" — Bajofondo Tango Club	Eliminated
Naomi & Steven	29 (5, 6, 6, 6, 6)	Jive	"Candyman" — Christina Aguilera	Safe
Fifi & Paul	37 (8, 8, 5, 8, 8)	Tango	"Theme from Mission: Impossible" — Chemical Brothers	Safe
Tatiana & Brendan	35 (7, 7, 7, 7, 7)	Jive	"Smiley Faces" — Gnarls Barkley	Safe
Jamie & Amanda	29 (7, 5, 4, 5, 8)	Tango	"History Repeating" — Propellerheads, feat. Shirley Bassey	Safe
David & Eliza	27 (5, 5, 5, 6, 6)	Tango	"Please Mister Brown"—Alma Cogan	Safe
Kate & John-Paul	46 (10, 9, 9, 9, 9)	Jive	"Joker & the Thief" — Wolfmother	Safe

=== Week 3 ===
Couples performed either the foxtrot or the salsa. Couples are listed in the order they performed.

Couple	Scores	Dance	Music	Result
David & Eliza	19 (3, 5, 5, 6)	Salsa	"Conga" — Miami Sound Machine	Safe
Tatiana & Brendan	30 (8, 7, 8, 7)	Foxtrot	"Temptation" — Diana Krall	Bottom two
Kimberley & Paul	29 (7, 7, 7, 8)	Salsa	"Miami" — Will Smith	Eliminated
Tim & Natalie	34 (8, 9, 8, 9)	Foxtrot	"On Broadway" — Bobby Darin	Safe
Jamie & Amanda	31 (9, 7, 7, 8)	Salsa	"Blood on the Dance Floor" — Michael Jackson	Safe
Kate & John-Paul	32 (8, 8, 9, 7)	Foxtrot	"Minnie the Moocher" — Big Bad Voodoo Daddy	Safe
Naomi & Steven	21 (3, 6, 6, 6)	Foxtrot	"L-O-V-E" — Nat King Cole	Safe
Fifi & Paul	34 (9, 8, 8, 9)	Salsa	"Hips Don't Lie" — Shakira	Safe
Todd & Emily	35 (8, 9, 9, 9)	Foxtrot	"Let Me Entertain You" — Debbie Gibson	Safe

=== Week 4 ===
Couples performed either the paso doble or the waltz. Couples are listed in the order they performed.

Couple	Scores	Dance	Music	Result
Tim & Natalie	32 (7, 8, 8, 9)	Paso doble	"España cañí" — Erich Kunzel	Safe
David & Eliza	18 (3, 5, 5, 5)	Waltz	"The Last Waltz" — Engelbert Humperdinck	Safe
Naomi & Steven	21 (5, 6, 5, 5)	Paso doble	"Carnaval de Paris" — Dario G	Eliminated
Todd & Emily	28 (6, 7, 7, 8)	Paso doble	"Ronda" — D. Badke	Safe
Fifi & Paul	31 (7, 8, 8, 8)	Waltz	"Could I Have This Dance" — Anne Murray	Safe
Tatiana & Brendan	33 (8, 8, 9, 8)	Paso doble	"Malagueña" — Ernesto Lecuona	Safe
Jamie & Amanda	24 (6, 6, 6, 6)	Waltz	"Kiss from a Rose" — Seal	Bottom two
Kate & John-Paul	36 (9, 9, 9, 9)	Paso doble	"Teahouse" — from The Matrix Reloaded	Safe

=== Week 5 ===
Couples performed either the rumba or the samba. Couples are listed in the order they performed.

Couple	Scores	Dance	Music	Result
Tatiana & Brendan	26 (6, 7, 6, 7)	Samba	"Déjà Vu" — Beyoncé	Safe
Tim & Natalie	35 (8, 9, 9, 9)	Rumba	"Eternal Flame" — The Bangles	Safe
Todd & Emily	27 (7, 7, 6, 7)	Samba	"The Coffee Song" — Frank Sinatra	Eliminated
David & Eliza	10 (1, 3, 2, 4)	Samba	"I'm Alive" — Celine Dion	Bottom two
Kate & John-Paul	30 (8, 7, 7, 8)	Rumba	"Sexual Healing" — Marvin Gaye	Safe
Fifi & Paul	32 (8, 8, 8, 8)	Samba	"Jeannie" — Hugo Montenegro	Safe
Jamie & Amanda	31 (8, 7, 8, 8)	Rumba	"You Raise Me Up" — Josh Groban	Safe

=== Week 6 ===
David Graham & Eliza Campagna were given the lowest possible score of 4/40 for their paso doble, which judge Mark Wilson called a "crapo doble". Todd McKenney remarked, "I only gave him a '1' because I didn't have a '0'".

Each couple performed one new routine, and then all couples participated in one of two group disco routines for individual points. Couples are listed in the order they performed.

Couple	Scores	Dance	Music	Result
David & Eliza	4 (1, 1, 1, 1)	Paso doble	"The Battle" & "Theme from Gladiator" — from Gladiator	Bottom two
Kate & John-Paul	30 (7, 7, 8, 8)	Waltz	"Hallelujah" — Leonard Cohen	Safe
Jamie & Amanda	25 (7, 6, 6, 6)	Quickstep	"Cabaret" — from Cabaret	Safe
Tim & Natalie	39 (10, 9, 10, 10)	Tango	"Allegretto" — Bond	Safe
Fifi & Paul	31 (8, 8, 7, 8)	Foxtrot	"I Just Want to Make Love to You" — Etta James	Safe
Tatiana & Brendan	28 (7, 7, 7, 7)	Cha-cha-cha	"Fever" — Tito Puente	Eliminated
David & Eliza	22 (4, 4, 6, 8)	Group; Disco	"Don't Stop 'Til You Get Enough" — Michael Jackson	
Jamie & Amanda	34 (8, 9, 8, 9)	Group; Disco	"Don't Stop 'Til You Get Enough" — Michael Jackson	
Tim & Natalie	34 (8, 9, 8, 9)	Group; Disco	"Don't Stop 'Til You Get Enough" — Michael Jackson	
Fifi & Paul	30 (7, 8, 7, 8)	Group; Disco	"Disco Inferno" — The Trammps	
Kate & John-Paul	30 (8, 8, 7, 7)	Group; Disco	"Disco Inferno" — The Trammps	
Tatiana & Brendan	26 (5, 7, 7, 7)	Group; Disco	"Disco Inferno" — The Trammps	

=== Week 7 ===
Before the elimination, but after the bottom two had been announced, David made the offer to withdraw from the competition to allow Kate to continue; he was eliminated naturally so is not considered a withdrawal.

Couples are listed in the order they performed.

Couple	Scores	Dance	Music	Result
Fifi & Paul	35 (9, 9, 8, 9)	Jive	"Rock Around The Clock" - Bill Haley	Safe
Jamie & Amanda	36 (9, 9, 9, 9)	Samba	"Hot Hot Hot" - Buster Poindexter	Safe
Kate & John-Paul	34 (9, 8, 8, 9)	Cha-cha-cha	"Pash" — Kate Ceberano	Bottom two
David & Eliza	24 (5, 6, 6, 7)	Quickstep	"Steppin' Out with My Baby" — Tony Bennett	Eliminated
Tim & Natalie	33 (7, 9, 8, 9)	Salsa	"Vehicle" — The Ides of March	Safe

=== Week 8 ===
Musical guests: Dannii Minogue

Each couple performed one new routine, and then all couples participated in a group Viennese waltz for individual points. Couples are listed in the order they performed.

Couple	Scores	Dance	Music	Result
Tim & Natalie	36 (9, 9, 9, 9)	Cha-cha-cha		Bottom two
Kate & John-Paul	35 (8, 9, 9, 9)	Tango		Safe
Jamie & Amanda	32 (8, 8, 8, 8)	Foxtrot		Eliminated
Fifi & Paul	30 (7, 7, 8, 8)	Paso doble		Safe
Tim & Natalie	34 (9, 8, 9, 8)	Group; Viennese waltz		
Kate & John-Paul	35 (9, 8, 9, 9)	Group; Viennese waltz		
Jamie & Amanda	29 (8, 7, 8, 6)	Group; Viennese waltz		
Fifi & Paul	30 (8, 7, 8, 7)	Group; Viennese waltz		

=== Week 9 ===
Couple	Scores	Dance	Music	Result
Kate & John-Paul	39 (10, 9, 10, 10)	Samba	Drop It On Me - Ricky Martin	Safe
Kate & John-Paul	34 (9, 8, 9, 8)	Argentine tango		Safe
Tim & Natalie	37 (10, 9, 9, 9)	Argentine tango		Eliminated
Tim & Natalie	35 (7, 10, 9, 9)	Waltz	You Light Up My Life - Debby Boone	Eliminated
Fifi & Paul	28 (7, 7, 7, 7)	Quickstep	Cheek To Cheek - Frank Sinatra	Bottom two
Fifi & Paul	33 (8, 9, 9, 7)	Argentine tango		Bottom two

=== Week 10 ===
Couple	Scores	Dance	Music	Result
Kate & John-Paul	36 (9, 9, 9, 9)	Salsa		Winners
Kate & John-Paul	37 (9, 9, 10, 9)	Jive	"Joker & the Thief" — Wolfmother	Winners
Kate & John-Paul	40 (10, 10, 10, 10)	Freestyle	West Side Story medley	Winners
Fifi & Paul	38 (9, 9, 10, 10)	Rumba	"Take My Breath Away" - Berlin	Runners-up
Fifi & Paul	38 (10, 9, 9, 10)	Salsa	"Hips Don't Lie" — Shakira	Runners-up
Fifi & Paul	38 (10, 10, 9, 9)	Freestyle	Michael Jackson medley	Runners-up

== Dance chart ==
- Week 1: Cha-cha-cha or quickstep
- Week 2: Jive or tango
- Week 3: Foxtrot or salsa
- Week 4: Paso doble or waltz
- Week 5: Rumba or samba
- Week 6: One unlearned dance & group disco
- Week 7: One unlearned dance
- Week 8: One unlearned dance & group Viennese waltz
- Week 9: One unlearned dance & Argentine tango
- Week 10: Two favourite dances of the season & freestyle

Dancing with the Stars (season 6) - Dance chart
Couple	Week														
Couple	1	2	3	4	5	6		7	8		9		10		
Kate & John-Paul	Quickstep	Jive	Foxtrot	Paso doble	Rumba	Waltz	Group; Disco	Cha-cha-cha	Tango	Group; Viennese waltz	Samba	Argentine tango	Salsa	Jive	Freestyle
Fifi & Paul G.	Cha-cha-cha	Tango	Salsa	Waltz	Samba	Foxtrot	Group; Disco	Jive	Paso doble	Group; Viennese waltz	Quickstep	Argentine tango	Rumba	Salsa	Freestyle
Tim & Natalie	Quickstep	Jive	Foxtrot	Paso doble	Rumba	Tango	Group; Disco	Salsa	Cha-cha-cha	Group; Viennese waltz	Argentine tango	Waltz			
Jamie & Amanda	Cha-cha-cha	Tango	Salsa	Waltz	Rumba	Quickstep	Group; Disco	Samba	Foxtrot	Group; Viennese waltz					
David & Eliza	Cha-cha-cha	Tango	Salsa	Waltz	Samba	Paso doble	Group; Disco	Quickstep							
Tatiana & Brendan	Quickstep	Jive	Foxtrot	Paso doble	Samba	Cha-cha-cha	Group; Disco								
Todd & Emily	Quickstep	Jive	Foxtrot	Paso doble	Samba										
Naomi & Steven	Quickstep	Jive	Foxtrot	Paso doble											
Kimberley & Paul Z.	Cha-cha-cha	Tango	Salsa												
Wendell & Linda	Cha-cha-cha	Tango													

Preceded by Dancing with the Stars (Australian season 5)	Dancing with the Stars (Australian version); Season 6	Succeeded by Dancing with the Stars (Australian season 7)
