= Electric Dreams =

Electric Dreams may refer to:

== Music ==
- Electric Dreams (Dan Lacksman album), 2013
- Electric Dreams (John McLaughlin with The One Truth Band album), 1979
- Electric Dreams (Slinkee Minx album), 2007
- Electric Dreams (soundtrack), from the 1984 film of the same name
- Electric Dreams, 2017 opera by Matthew Shlomowitz
- "Electric Dream", a 2021 song by Pixey

== Film and TV ==
- Electric Dreams (film), a 1984 film directed by Steven Barron
- Electric Dreams (2009 TV series), a 2009 UK documentary series
- Electric Dreams (2017 TV series), a 2017 TV series based on the works of Philip K. Dick

== Other uses ==
- Electric Dreams Software, a UK video game publisher

== See also ==
- Electronic Dream (2011 album) debut album of AraabMuzik
- "Together in Electric Dreams", a 1984 song by Philip Oakey and Giorgio Moroder
