= Blue Yonder (album) =

Studio album by Blue Yonder
- Released: 1987
- Length: 42:55
- Label: Atlantic
- Producer: John Brand, Arif Mardin

Blue Yonder is the debut and sole studio album by American duo Blue Yonder, released by Atlantic in 1987.

Two singles were released from the album: "Windsong" and "House of Love". "House of Love" was also recorded by American singer Maria Vidal for her 1987 self-titled debut album.

== Critical reception ==
Upon its release, Billboard praised Stewart's "intriguing vocals" for being "the chief asset of this debut album". They felt "Windsong" "might cut a radio groove" but added the album's "moody songs generally lack necessary momentum for chart longevity". Cash Box praised the album's "powerful collection of good, honest songs" and added, "Stewart's vocals exhibit a passion that places her in a league with Annie Lennox and Chrissie Hynde." Gary Graff of the Detroit Free Press described the album as "well-done, albeit same-sounding pop". Music & Media picked Blue Yonder as one of their "albums of the week" on February 21, 1987.

== Track listing ==
All tracks are written by Sandy Stewart and David Munday except where noted.

No.	Title	Writer(s)	Length
1.	"Windsong"		4:11
2.	"House of Love"	Stewart	4:59
3.	"When Grace Is Falling"		4:39
4.	"In the Rain"	Stewart	3:36
5.	"Still I Love"	Stewart, Munday, Never	5:07
6.	"The Long Haul"		4:49
7.	"Something for the Pain"		5:09
8.	"Indigo"		5:38
9.	"Secret Miracle"		4:47
Total length:			42:55

== Personnel ==
Blue Yonder

- Sandy Stewart – vocals, piano, synth, keyboards, percussion
- David Munday – vocals, guitar, bass guitar, synth, piano, keyboards, percussion

Additional musicians

- Philippe Saisse – keyboards (tracks 1–2), programming (tracks 1–2), additional arrangements (tracks 1–2)
- Kip Winger – bass guitar (tracks 1–2)
- David Rosenberg – drums (tracks 1–2)
- David Ruffy – drums (tracks 3, 5, 7–9)
- Chuck Sabo – percussion (tracks 1, 6), drums (track 6)
- Anthony Thistlethwaite – saxophone (tracks 3, 8)
- Roddy Lorimer – trumpet (track 5)
- Tim Saunders – tenor sax (track 5)
- Simon Clarke – alto sax (track 5)
- Tessa Niles, Linda Taylor, Ruby James – additional backing vocals (tracks 2, 7)
- Steve Hogarth – backing vocals (track 6), additional backing vocals (track 9)
- Graeme Pleeth – additional keyboards (track 8)
- Max Edie – additional backing vocals (track 9)

Production

- John Brand – producer (all tracks), engineer (all tracks), mixing (all tracks)
- Arif Mardin – producer (tracks 1–2), mixing (tracks 1–2)
- Clive Martin – engineer (all tracks), mixing (all tracks)
- Philippe Saisse – associate producer
- Felix Kendall, Eddie Garcia, Tony Harris, Sandy McLelland, Gerrard Johnson – additional engineering
- James Cassidy, Fiona Death, Jim Mark, Jon – assistant engineers

Other

- Laurence Dunmore – design
- Russell Young – photography
