= Paramind =

Brainstorming software program

ParaMind Brainstorming Software
- Industry: Software
- Founded: 1980s
- Products: Brainstorming software programs

ParaMind Brainstorming Software is one of many brainstorming software programs and was the first of the generative programs that went beyond random word combination.

ParaMind was mentioned in the book, "The Age of Spiritual Machines", by Ray Kurzweil. ParaMind was also noted in Creative Problem Solving for Managers: Developing Skills for Decision Making And Innovation, by Tony Proctor, Ideate with June A Valladares by June A. Valladares and Root Cause Analysis: Simplified Tools and Techniques, Second Edition by Bjorn Andersen and Tom Fagerhaug.

In Guide to Writing Empirical Papers, Theses, and Dissertations author G. David Garson states,

"It works by generating new text from your writing, thereby expanding on any idea based on one of hundreds of built-in related word chains, to which the writer can add. As such, it goes beyond common 'writer's helper' software that may ask the writer questions related to his or her subject, flow charting that writer's concepts or generating random word combinations that provide idea variations typed in by the author. In ParaMind, a single sentence or paragraph can be expanded and permuted into up to 100 pages of related statements. In simple 'merge' mode, ParaMind operates as a sort of thesaurus, suggesting substitutes for words the writer highlights in text. However, in 'large merge' mode, many pages of new, reworded relationships are generated, providing feedback on hundreds of new relationships and associations relevant to the concepts contained in the author's original text."

The Exhaustion of the Interaction of Words: Brainstorming with the ParaMind Brainstorming Program, by R.S. Pearson is devoted to ParaMind. It discusses an experimental linguistic theory that has philosophical overtones.

ParaMind was the first brainstorming program for Microsoft Windows in 1992. The company released a more advanced Professional Version in 2002. The company produced databases for Science and Law/Business that can be added to any version after 3.0. 64-bit versions are available for Windows 7 and Windows 8, as well as current Macintosh and Linux operating systems.

== Sources ==
- Proctor, Tony: Creative Problem Solving for Managers: Developing Skills for Decision Making And Innovation, Routledge. Exeter 2005. ISBN 978-0-415-34542-2
- Pearson, R.S.: The Exhaustion of the Interaction of Words: Brainstorming with the ParaMind Brainstorming Program, Telical Books. Seattle 2007. ISBN 978-0-9748139-0-5
- Valladares, June A.: Ideate with June A Valladares, Sage Publications. Stamford 2005. ISBN 0-7619-3271-2
- Andersen, Bjorn: Root Cause Analysis: Simplified Tools and Techniques, ASQ Quality Press. Milwaukee 2006. ISBN 0-87389-692-0

== In music ==
- Bon Iver, 29 #Strafford APTS (on album 22, A Million)
