= Gordon Perry =

Gordon Perry may refer to:

- Gordon Perry (producer) (born 1947), record producer
- Gordie Perry (1903–2003), football player in the Canadian Football League
- Gordon Perry (wheelchair athlete), British wheelchair athlete
