= Wild Heart (Stevie Nicks song) =

Song by Stevie Nicks

from the album The Wild Heart
- Released: 1983
- Recorded: 1983
- Genre: Rock
- Length: 6:08
- Label: Modern
- Songwriter: Stevie Nicks
- Producers: Jimmy Iovine; Gordon Perry

"Wild Heart" is a 1983 song by the American singer-songwriter Stevie Nicks. It is the opening track from her second solo album, The Wild Heart.

== Background ==
In an interview with Jim Ladd in 1983, Nicks said of the song, "The song the Wild Heart is kind of an abstract song, that was written in Long Island, New York. I mean at the same time that Enchanted was written. A long, long time ago, right at the same time that Bella Donna came out."

== Album version ==
Nicks wrote the music of "Wild Heart" for the album version of the song and received full writing credits for the song. She made several changes to the lyrics of the song, such as an introduction dedicated to her then recently deceased friend, Robin Anderson. When Nicks played the song to her friend Tom Petty he said it was "epic". The song is over six minutes long.

== Rolling Stone photo shoot ==
A now-famous video of Nicks singing an early version of this song at a Rolling Stone photo shoot surfaced in 2008 on YouTube, attracting over a million views. This early version shows Nicks singing the lyrics of "Wild Heart" over an early demo of "Can't Go Back" called "Suma's Walk".

== Personnel ==
- Stevie Nicks – lead vocals
- Lori Perry-Nicks – harmony vocals
- Sharon Celani – backing vocals
- Sandy Stewart – synthesizer
- David Munday – guitar
- Roger Tausz – bass guitar
- Brad Smith – drums, percussion
- Dean Parks – guitar

== Other sources ==
- Timespace – The Best of Stevie Nicks, liner notes
- Crystal Visions – The Very Best of Stevie Nicks, liner notes and commentary
