= 22, A Million =

Studio album by Bon Iver
- Released: September 30, 2016
- Recorded: 2012–2016
- Studio: April Base (Eau Claire)
- Genres: Folktronica; art pop; electronic
- Length: 34:10
- Label: Jagjaguwar
- Producers: April Base; Justin Vernon; Chris Messina

Bon Iver chronology
iTunes Session (2012)	22, A Million (2016)	I, I (2019)

Singles from 22, A Million
- 1. "22 (Over Soon)" / "10 dEAThbREasT" Released: August 15, 2016; 2. "33 'God'" Released: August 29, 2016

22, A Million is the third studio album by American indie folk band Bon Iver, released on September 30, 2016. Recorded in lead member Justin Vernon's April Base studio in Eau Claire, Wisconsin, the album marks a major shift in the band's sound and incorporates elements of electronic music. Most of the lyricism concerns Bon Iver's rise in popularity and how Vernon's relationship with the world has changed as a result.

22, A Million first premiered at Vernon's Eaux Claires Music Festival, and upon release the album debuted at number 2 on the Billboard 200, receiving widespread acclaim from critics who praised its original sound and colorful lyricism. Several publications, including Pitchfork, Rolling Stone and The Guardian, listed 22, A Million as one of the best albums of 2016. It also received nominations for Best Alternative Music Album and Best Recording Package at the 2017 Grammy Awards. In 2019, Pitchfork and Rolling Stone included it in their list of best albums of the decade, at number 91 and 47, respectively.

== Background ==
22, A Million is composed of songs written and produced from 2012 to 2016. It makes extensive use of samples, synths and brass instruments. Many of the sounds on the record were created and manipulated using a Teenage Engineering OP-1 synthesizer, along with a harmonizer dubbed "The Messina", designed for the band by engineer and producer Chris Messina.

== Critical reception ==
Professional ratings
Aggregate scores
Source	Rating
AnyDecentMusic?	8.5/10
Metacritic	87/100
Review scores
Source	Rating
AllMusic	4/5 stars
The A.V. Club	B+
The Daily Telegraph	4/5 stars
Entertainment Weekly	B
The Guardian	4/5 stars
The Independent	5/5 stars
NME	4/5
Pitchfork	9.0/10
Q	4/5 stars
Rolling Stone	4/5 stars

22, A Million received acclaim from critics, garnering a score of 87 out of 100 on Metacritic, signifying "universal acclaim" based on 41 critic reviews. Writing for Pretty Much Amazing, Peter Tabakis praised the album in his review, giving it an A, and remarking, "Not since Kid A has an album so superb pushed away and pulled closer its audience, simultaneously and with such aplomb." In his review for Rolling Stone, Will Hermes opined, "Vernon remains an oblique lyricist, but the knottiness can be compelling." It gave it four stars out of five. Paul Bridgewater of The Line of Best Fit awarded the record full marks, writing that "22, A Million captures personal crisis and resolution better than any album this century". Writing for No Depression, John Amen commented that 22, A Million "integrates the high points of Bon Iver's first three recordings ... his most focused and ambitious permutation to date."

=== Accolades ===
Critical accolades received by 22, A Million
Publication	Accolade	Year	Rank	Ref.
Mojo	The 50 Best Albums of 2016	2016	16	
NME	NME's Albums of the Year 2016	2016	50	
NPR	Best 50 Albums of 2016	2016	5	
Paste	The 50 Best Albums of 2016	2016	9	
Pitchfork	The 50 Best Albums of 2016	2016	12	
Pitchfork	The 20 Best Rock Albums of 2016	2016	—N/a	
Pitchfork	The 200 Best Albums of the 2010s	2019	91	
The Quietus	Albums of the Year 2016	2016	88	
Rolling Stone	50 Best Albums of 2016	2016	22	
Rolling Stone	The 100 Best Albums of the 2010s	2019	47	
Rough Trade	Albums of the Year	2016	51	
The Skinny	Top 50 Albums of 2016	2016	3	
Stereogum	The 50 Best Albums of 2016	2016	15	
Variance	50 Best Albums of 2016	2016	5	

== Commercial performance ==
22, A Million debuted at number two on the Billboard 200 with 71,000 units, of which 58,000 were traditional album sales. It was the highest-selling album of the week.

== Track listing ==
No.	Title	Writer(s)	Alternate title	Length
1.	"22 Over Soon"	Justin Vernon	22 (OVER S∞∞N)	2:48
2.	"10 Death Breast"	Vernon; Ben Lester; BJ Burton	10 d E A T h b R E a s T ⊠ ⊠	2:24
3.	"715 Creeks" (recorded on "The Messina")	Vernon	715 - CRΣΣKS	2:12
4.	"33 'God' "	Vernon	33 "GOD"	3:33
5.	"29 Strafford Apts"	Vernon; Burton	29 #Strafford APTS	4:05
6.	"666 Upside Down Cross"	Vernon	666 ʇ	4:12
7.	"21 Moon Water"	Vernon; Sean Carey	21 M♢♢N WATER	3:08
8.	"8 Circle"	Vernon; Ryan Olson; Burton; Michael Lewis (additional lyrics)	8 (circle)	5:09
9.	"45"	Vernon; Lewis	____45_____	2:46
10.	"00000 Million" (recorded on "The Jannette")	Vernon; Lewis		3:53
Total length:				34:10

Sample credits

- "22 Over Soon" contains a sample of "How I Got Over", as written by Clara Ward and performed by Mahalia Jackson.
- "10 Death Breast" contains a sample of "Wild Heart", as written and performed by Stevie Nicks.
- "33 'God'" contains samples of "Dsharpg", as written and performed by Sharon Van Etten, "Morning", as written by Willis S. Graham and performed by Jim Ed Brown, "Iron Sky", as written by Paolo Nutini and Dani Castelar and performed by Paolo Nutini, and "All Rendered Truth", as written and performed by Lonnie Holley.
- "666 Upside Down Cross" contains a sample of "Standing in the Need of Prayer", as written by Dave Kingsby and performed by The Supreme Jubilees.
- "21 Moon Water" contains samples of "A Lover's Concerto", as written by Denny Randell and Sandy Linzer, and performed by The Toys.
- "00000 Million" contains a sample of "Abacus" as written and performed by Fionn Regan.

== Personnel ==
Credits are adapted from the album's liner notes.

Bon Iver

- Justin Vernon ("Maker") – performer, OP-1, "gritar", Prophet, bass, drums, M1, "The Messina"
- Sean Carey – drums (6, 8), percussion (6), DX-7 (7)
- Andy Fitzpatrick – "The 22000" (2, 7, 8), OP-1 (6)
- Matt McCaughan – metal drum (6), drums (8)

Additional musicians

- Andrew Broder – "programming V3" (6), "audible programming" (9)
- James Buckley – bass (6)
- BJ Burton ("Noble Black Eagle") – performer, "programming C1 C2" (6), "saxophone man" (7), programming (8)
- Elise Carey – voice (7)
- Andra Chumas ("Mother Nourishment") – performer
- Brad Cook ("Wings") – performer
- Trever Hagen – prepared trumpet (4)
- Michael Lewis ("The Oracle") – performer, saxophone (1, 6–8), "saxophone man" (7), "The Messina" (9)
- Chris Messina ("Maker's Maker") – performer
- Cherie Minske ("Rookie") – performer
- Rob Moose ("The Whisperer") – performer, violin arrangement (1), viola arrangement (1), saxophone arrangement (2, 5, 6, 8)
- Michael Vincent Vognar Noyce – voice (8)
- Ryan Olson ("Scream Defense") – performer, MIDI capture piano (1), sampler (7), field recorder (7)
- Mike Perry ("Neighbor") – performer
- Chris Rosenau – electric guitar (4), acoustic guitar (4)
- Camilla Staveley-Taylor ("Trust Ear") – performer, voice (7)
- Jessica Staveley-Taylor – voice (7)
- Colin Stetson – saxophone (8)
- Joe "Squints" Westerlund – bowed cymbals (4)
- "Jack" ("The Prospector") – performer
- "Drew" ("Keys Grip") – performer
- "Sad Sax of Shit":
  - Al Falaschi – performer, saxophone (1, 2, 4–6, 8)
  - Christopher Thomas – performer, saxophone (1, 2, 4–6, 8)
  - Clay Lyons – performer, saxophone (1, 2, 4–6, 8)
  - Clay Pufahl – performer, saxophone (1, 2, 4–6, 8)
  - David Laurenzi – performer, saxophone (1, 2, 4–6, 8)
  - Mark Henderson – performer, saxophone (1, 2, 4–6, 8)
  - Matt Douglas – performer, saxophone (1, 2, 4–6, 8)
  - Michael Lewis – performer, saxophone (1, 2, 4–6, 8)
  - Nelson Devereaux – performer, saxophone (1, 2, 4–6, 8)
  - Peterson Ross – performer, saxophone (1, 2, 4–6, 8)
  - Scott Fuitz – performer, saxophone (1, 2, 4–6, 8)
  - Anthony Barba – performer, saxophone (1, 2, 4–6, 8)

Production

- April Base – producer
- Zach Hanson – mixing
- Huntley Miller – mastering

Artwork

- Eric Timothy Carlson – art

== Charts ==
=== Weekly charts ===
Weekly chart performance for 22, A Million
Chart (2016)	Peak position
Australian Albums (ARIA)	2
Austrian Albums (Ö3 Austria)	8
Belgian Albums (Ultratop Flanders)	2
Belgian Albums (Ultratop Wallonia)	22
Canadian Albums (Billboard)	1
Danish Albums (Hitlisten)	3
Dutch Albums (Album Top 100)	8
Finnish Albums (Suomen virallinen lista)	19
French Albums (SNEP)	31
German Albums (Offizielle Top 100)	7
Irish Albums (IRMA)	2
Italian Albums (FIMI)	9
New Zealand Albums (RMNZ)	1
Norwegian Albums (VG-lista)	3
Portuguese Albums (AFP)	10
Scottish Albums (Official Charts)	1
Spanish Albums (Promusicae)	17
Swedish Albums (Sverigetopplistan)	2
Swiss Albums (Schweizer Hitparade)	4
UK Albums (Official Charts)	2
US Billboard 200	2
US Americana/Folk Albums (Billboard)	1
US Top Alternative Albums (Billboard)	1
US Top Rock Albums (Billboard)	1
US Independent Albums (Billboard)	1
US Indie Store Album Sales (Billboard)	1

=== Year-end charts ===
Year-end chart performance for 22, A Million
Chart (2016)	Position
Belgian Albums (Ultratop Flanders)	57
US Top Rock Albums (Billboard)	37

== Certifications ==
Certifications for 22, A Million
Region	Certification	Certified units/sales
Denmark (IFPI Danmark)	Gold	10,000^{‡}
United Kingdom (BPI)	Gold	100,000^{‡}
^{‡} Sales+streaming figures based on certification alone.
