= If Anyone Falls =

Single by Stevie Nicks

from the album The Wild Heart
- B-side: "Wild Heart"
- Released: September 3, 1983
- Recorded: 1983
- Genre: Rock
- Length: 4:07
- Label: Modern
- Songwriters: Stevie Nicks; Sandy Stewart
- Producer: Jimmy Iovine

Stevie Nicks singles chronology
"Stand Back" (1983)	"If Anyone Falls" (1983)	"Nightbird" (1983)

"If Anyone Falls" is a song by American singer-songwriter Stevie Nicks. It was the second single from her second solo studio album The Wild Heart (1983). The song peaked at number 14 on the US Billboard Hot 100 and reached number eight on the Billboard Mainstream Rock chart.

== Background ==
The song is based on an instrumental synthesizer track called "The Last American," written by singer-songwriter Sandy Stewart. Dallas studio owner and producer Gordon Perry sent the track to Nicks. "The next thing I know, I’m on the phone and Gordon’s saying, 'You can’t have it back. They want to use it on Stevie's next album," Stewart told Record magazine in 1984.

== Critical reception ==
Reviewing the song for Music Week Tony Jasper commented on Nicks vocals, saying that she "rides along attractively with some vocal fire, but even multi-tracked, the full potential is not realised." Cash Box said that the song "manages to be familiar and sure-footed without being predictable."

== Personnel ==
- Stevie Nicks – vocals
- Waddy Wachtel – guitar
- Sandy Stewart – synthesizer
- Bob Glaub – bass
- Roy Bittan – synthesizer, piano
- Russ Kunkel – drum overdubs
- Bobbye Hall – percussion
- Sharon Celani – background vocals
- Lori Perry-Nicks – background vocals
- Carolyn Brooks – background vocals

== Charts ==
=== Weekly charts ===
Weekly chart performance for "If Anyone Falls"
Chart (1983)	Peak position
US Billboard Hot 100	14
US Top Rock Tracks (Billboard)	8
US Cash Box Top 100	15
US AOR/Hot Tracks (Radio & Records)	12
US Contemporary Hit Radio (Radio & Records)	9

=== Year-end charts ===
Year-end chart performance for "If Anyone Falls"
Chart (1983)	Position
US Cash Box Top 100	98
US AOR/Hot Tracks (Radio & Records)	83
US Contemporary Hit Radio (Radio & Records)	80

== Notes ==
- Timespace – The Best of Stevie Nicks, liner notes
- Crystal Visions – The Very Best of Stevie Nicks, liner notes and commentary
