= Alex Karbouris discography =

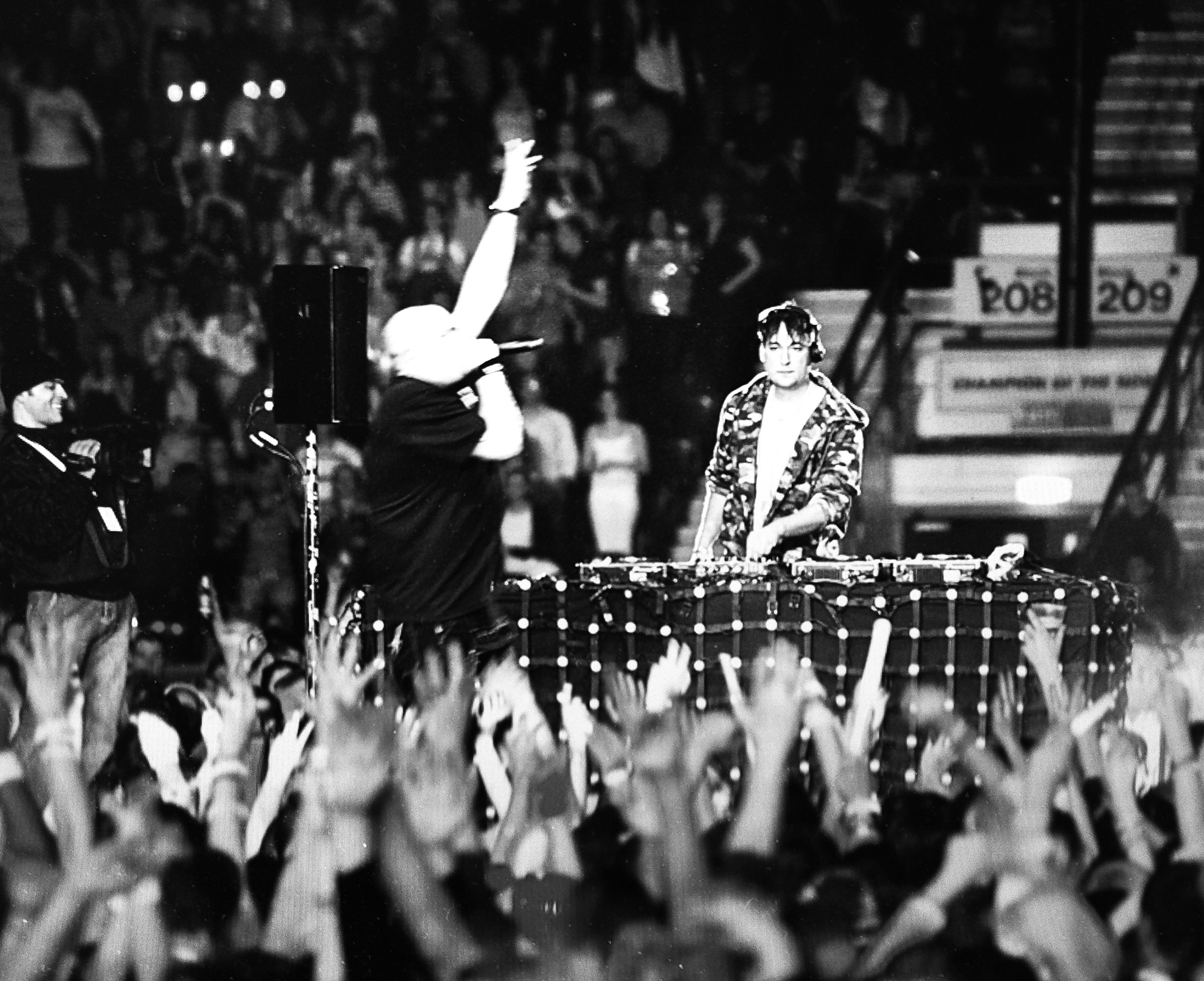
- Alex K performing at Clubland Live MEN Arena, UK
- Studio albums: 2
- Compilation albums: 16

The discography of Alex Karbouris, an Australian DJ/Producer, consists of 16 compilation albums, 96 singles and a number of other remix & production appearances.

== Albums ==
=== Compilation Albums ===
Title	Year	Peak chart positions			
Title	Year	AUS	NZ	UK	US
Kickin' Hard 1	1998	2	—	—	—
Kickin' Hard 2	2000	2	—	—	—
Kickin' Hard 3	2001	1	—	—	—
Kickin' Hard 4	2002	2	—	—	—
Kickin' Hard 5	2003	1	—	—	—
Kickin' Hard 6	2004	2	—	—	—
North Vs South	2004	—	—	—	—
Ultimate NRG 1	2006	—	—	1	—
Klubbed vol. 1	2006	10	—	—	—
Ultimate NRG 2	2007	—	—	1	—
Klubbed vol. 2	2007	3	—	—	—
Ultimate NRG 3	2008	—	—	1	—
Ultimate NRG 4	2009	8	—	2	—
Ultimate NRG Megamix	2010	—	—	2	—
Ultimate NRG 5	2011	3	—	2	—
Kickin Hard 11	2011	—	—	—	—
Alex K - Past 2 Present	2012	17	—	—	—
Maximum NRG	2013	8	—	—	—
Alex K - Unreleased	2014	3	—	—	—
"—" denotes album that did not chart or was not released

== Singles ==
1998

- Alex K - Pussywhipped
- Alex K - U Got It
- Alex K - Passion
- Alex K - Kick it

1999

- Alex K - Shake it up
- Alex K & Jorjie Jay - Rock my world
- Alex K - Pump it up
- Alex K - Cream of sum young guy
- Alex K & Supafly - Got to be love

2000

- Alex K - Weppa
- Alex K - Don't u want my love
- Alex K - Go!
- Alex K & Amen UK - I cant wait
- Alex K & Amen UK - Angel in my heart
- Alex K & Amen UK - Garden of eden
- Alex K feat Pamela - Kickin in the beat
- Alex K feat Pamela - Cmon
- Alex K - Rub a dub dub

2001

- Alex K - Phatt Attack
- Alex K - Go!
- Alex K - Ill be there
- Alex K - On the floor 2001
- Alex K - Let the fiddler play

2002

- Alex K - Tha Beat Pounds
- Alex K & Dee - One Summer
- Alex K - Tell me
- Alex K - Instant Momentum
- Europa - Follow the sun
- Klubkillaz - One for ya

2003

- Alex K - Here comes the bass
- Europa - Fear no evil
- Club Enforcer - Tutti Frutti
- Club Enforcer - Throw your hands
- Club Enforcer - Beat of the year
- Club Enforcer - Rock tha house
- Plus 8 - Rippin it up
- DJ S - Djs gonna rock tha house
- Alex K vs Ehab Tawfiq - Allah Aliek Ya Sidi

2004

- Alex K - The raid
- Alex K feat Cover Girls - Attitude
- Plus 8 - Go DJ
- Alex K - Pussywhipped 2004
- Alex K & Wilz - Dab Ke
- Alex K feat Mia - Right here waiting
- Alex K feat Mia - My angel
- Alex K - Pussy pussy

2005

- Alex K feat Ellewood - Small town boy
- Club Enforcer - Here to chill
- Bandito - Rock rite

2006

- AK Project - Forever
- Amen vs Alex K - Happiness
- AK Project - Come with me
- Sublime - The Rain
- Alex K - Piece of heaven
- Bounce Mafia - Shake that ass
- Porn kings v Klubbed DJs - Amour (Are you ready)
- DJ Sasher - This is no game
- Klubsound - Touch me
- Alex K & Re-Con - Stab Em
- Doje Vamo - 38000 ft
- Klubbed - Firefly
- Klubbers Guide - Pop to this
- Alex K - Faith

2007

- Breeze & Lost Witness - Rise Again
- Alex K v Kuta - Let there be passion
- Alex K - Long way from home
- Superstar DJs - Meet her at the love parade
- Alex K - DJ
- Alex K - My time

2008

- Bassfreakerz - Now your gone
- Club Enforcer - Get up everybody
- Club Enforcer - Royal Flush
- Beat Trippa - Insomnia
- Dinky Allstars - Faith
- Bassfreakerz - Cry for you

2009

- Alex K - If you were mine
- Alex K & Don da da v Pacjam - Lover that you are
- Bad boy - Forever
- Alex K - When the rain begins to fall
- X Rated - On the floor
- Alex K - Another chance
- Alex K - If i don't have you
- Bassfreazerz - Zombie Nation
- Klubbed Djs - Love come down
- XNRG ft Alex K - Riverside
- Alex K ft Taline - Can you feel it

2010

- Alex K - Running
- Phonikal - Sunshine
- Alex K & Wilz - Lost connection (Yo Dj!)
- Alex K & Wilz - Run to me
- Alex K - Raining down
- Alex K - Hooked

2011

- Alex K - Fly
- Alex K - The Calling
- Alex K - Beachball

== Music videos ==
- "If you were mine"
- "Angel in my heart"
