= Maria Vidal (album) =

Studio album by Maria Vidal
- Released: 1987
- Length: 41:38
- Label: A&M
- Producer: Rick Nowels; Maria Vidal; Robbie Seidman; Desmond Child; Jimmy Iovine; Jimmy Bralower; Chas Sandford

Maria Vidal chronology
Maria Vidal (1987)	Living in Radical Radiance (2009)

Maria Vidal is the debut studio album by American singer Maria Vidal, released by A&M in 1987.

The album's first single was "House of Love". The song was written by Sandy Stewart and originally recorded by Blue Yonder, the name of her duo with David Munday. Blue Yonder's version was released earlier in 1987 as the second single from their self-titled debut album. The second and final single "Do Me Right" was written and produced by Desmond Child. The song's music video was directed by David Fincher and achieved medium rotation on MTV.

== Critical reception ==
Professional ratings
Review scores
Source	Rating
AllMusic	3/5 stars
The Philadelphia Inquirer	3/4 stars

On its release, Billboard commented, "Strong-voiced dance-oriented thrush makes a potent album debut with upbeat material." They added that tracks such as "The Real Feel", "Do Me Right" and "House of Love" "harbinger well for radio and club acceptance". Jack Lloyd, writing for The Philadelphia Inquirer, felt that Vidal displays "an abundance of talent" on the album and added that she "demonstrat[es] that she can handle a rocker as well as a ballad". He noted "several strong numbers" but was critical of the various producers involved which he felt resulted in "a lack of cohesion".

Hugh Wyatt of the Daily News noted the presence of various musicians and producers on the album who "all contribute well to the background and instrumentation", but believed that the music receives "its biggest boost" from the "mellow, lyrical and assertive vocalese" of Vidal. He felt Vidal was inspired by Laura Nyro and Diana Ross and added, "Vidal's most appealing asset is that she can create a genuine rock feeling while propelling a scintillating dance beat." Music & Media praised the album as "good, sophisticated stuff" and picked "The Real Feel", "Soul Love" and "I Am a Girl in Spain" as the highlights. They noted that the influences "vary from Joni Mitchell to Stevie Nicks" and added that the producers involved "is like a Who's Who of top studio technicians". In a retrospective review, Alex Henderson of AllMusic described Maria Vidal as a "solid pop/rock effort" which "didn't do nearly as well as it should have". He recommended the album to "fans of 1980s pop/rock if they're able to track down a copy".

== Track listing ==
No.	Title	Writer(s)	Length
1.	"Bridges of Innocence"	Maria Vidal, Robbie Seidman	4:36
2.	"The Real Feel"	Rick Nowels, Ellen Shipley	3:29
3.	"Do Me Right"	Desmond Child	3:47
4.	"I Am a Girl in Spain"	Vidal, Seidman	5:19
5.	"House of Love"	Sandy Stewart	4:23
6.	"Angel (In the Sway of Those Summer Nights)"	Vidal, Seidman	4:34
7.	"Soul Love"	Nowels, Seidman	3:56
8.	"Sleep Won't Come"	Vidal, Seidman	2:35
9.	"Make Believe"	Chas Sandford, James Haymer	3:47
10.	"Life on the Train"	Vidal, Seidman	5:12

== Personnel ==
Credits are adapted from the LP album sleeve notes.

- Maria Vidal – vocals (1–10), backing vocals (1–6, 8–10)
- Diana Grasselli – backing vocals (2, 5)
- Alex Brown – backing vocals (2)
- Katrina Perkins – backing vocals (2)
- The Spinners – backing vocals (7)
- Joe Chambers – backing vocals (10)
- Willie Chambers – backing vocals (10)
- Charles Judge – synthesizer (1–2, 4–6, 10), programmer (1–2, 4–6, 10), additional keyboards (3)
- Robbie Seidman – additional keyboards (1, 4, 6, 10), backing vocals (4, 8, 10)
- Desmond Child – keyboards (3), backing vocals (3)
- Jeff Bova – synthesizers (7)
- Michael Landau – guitars (1–2, 4, 6, 10)
- Rick Nowels – acoustic guitar (1, 6), keyboards (2), bass (2), backing vocals (2, 5)
- Marty Walsh – guitars (2)
- John Putnam – guitars (3), bass (3)
- Bruce Kulick – additional guitars (3)
- James Harrah – guitars (5)
- Dean Parks – guitars (7)
- John McCurry – guitars (7)
- Dweezil Zappa – guitars (8)
- Larry Klein – bass (4)
- Neil Jason – bass (7)
- Patrick O'Hearn – bass (10)
- Russ Kunkel – drums (7)
- Paulinho da Costa – percussion (4, 10)
- Frank Vilardi – drum programming (3)
- Dave Ervin – drum programming (3)
- Jimmy Bralower – drum programming (7)
- Chas Sandford – all instruments (9)

Production

- Rick Nowels – producer (1–2, 4–6, 10)
- Maria Vidal – producer (1, 4–6, 8, 10)
- Robbie Seidman – producer (1, 4, 6, 8, 10)
- Desmond Child – producer (3)
- Jimmy Iovine – producer (7), executive producer
- Jimmy Bralower – producer (7)
- Chas Sandford – producer (9), mixing engineer (9)
- Brian Malouf – engineer (1, 4, 6, 10)
- John Kovarek – engineer (2)
- Stacy Baird – engineer (5, 8), additional engineering
- Rob Jacobs – engineer (5), additional engineering
- Dan Nash – engineer (5), additional engineering
- Malcolm Pollack – engineer (7)
- Roey Shamir – engineer (7)
- Thom Panunzio – engineer (7)
- Robert de la Garza – engineer (10), additional engineering
- Tom Banghart – assistant engineer (5)
- Mark McKenna, Robert Feist – additional engineering
- Brian McGee – mixing engineer (1, 4, 8, 10)
- Steve MacMillan – mixing engineer (2, 6)
- Scott Litt – mixing engineer (3)
- Paul Lani – mixing engineer (5)
- Matthew Kasha – mixing engineer (7)
- Gary McGachon – mixing engineer (9)
- Jay Healy – assistant mixing engineer (1, 4)
- Michael Ross – assistant mixing engineer (2, 6, 10)
- Marc de Sisto – assistant mixing engineer (3), additional engineering
- Carey Butler – assistant mixing engineer (5, 7)
- Stan Katayama – assistant mixing engineer (8)
- Jay Willis – mastering
- Shelly Yakus – mastering

Other

- Chuck Beeson – art direction
- Melanie Nissen – art direction, design
- Greg Gorman – photography
