= Way of Life (Slinkee Minx song) =

Single by Slinkee Minx

from the album Electric Dreams
- Released: 9 June 2007
- Genre: Dance
- Label: Central Station
- Songwriter(s): T Dudfield, A Love

Slinkee Minx singles chronology
"Someday" (2005)	"Way of Life" (2007)	"Send Me an Angel" (2007)

"Way of Life" is Slinkee Minx's fourth single and was released on 9 June 2007 through Australian record label Central Station Records. The single peaked at #13 on the Finnish Singles Chart, #60 Aria Physical Charts (Australia) and #21 on the Aria Dance Charts (Australia).

== Track listing ==
1. "Way of Life" (Radio Edit) – 3:39
2. "Way of Life" (KC Baker Radio Edit) – 3:18
3. "Way of Life" – 4:30
4. "Way of Life" (KC Baker Club Mix) – 6:46
5. "Way of Life" (Acoustic) – 3:33
