= Maria Vidal =

American singer (born 1960)

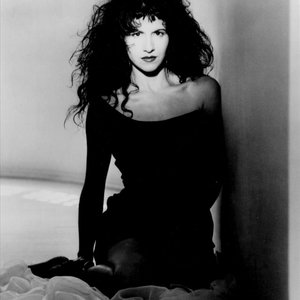
- Vidal in 1987

Background information
- Born: Maria Elena Vidal; August 1, 1960 (age 66); Miami, Florida, U.S.
- Genres: Dance-pop; alternative rock
- Occupation: Singer
- Years active: 1979–present
- Labels: Capitol; EMI America; A&M; Charisma
- Formerly of: Desmond Child & Rouge

Maria Elena Vidal (born August 1, 1960) is an American singer-songwriter. Her single "Body Rock" reached No. 8 on the US Dance Charts, No. 48 on the Hot 100, No. 5 on the Springbok Charts in South Africa, and No. 11 in the UK, and charted on various other international charts. It was the theme song to the film Body Rock in 1984.

== Early life ==
Vidal was born to parents of Hispanic heritage. Sometime later, she met Desmond Child and the two began writing songs and started a music career. Despite these, she still worked at a diner for extra income. Due to her slight physical resemblance to actress and photographer Gina Lollobrigida, her co-workers, as well as the diner's owner and manager, nicknamed her Gina.

== Career ==
=== Early career (1977–1980) ===
Vidal was a founding member of the New York City-based band Desmond Child & Rouge. They released two well-received albums in 1979 and 1980 for Capitol Records. They toured the country and were the musical guests on Saturday Night Live. Their iconic hit "Our Love Is Insane" was their own particular blend of rock and disco. The band is known for their inclusion on the soundtrack to The Warriors in 1979, with the song "Last of an Ancient Breed".

Vidal, as a member of Rouge along with Diana Grasselli and Myriam Valle, was asked by Paul Shaffer (the band's keyboardist), to sing on a live comedy album that he was the musical director on for Gilda Radner. While making the album, Radner and producer Lorne Michaels decided instead to turn it into a Broadway show: Gilda Radner – Live From New York opened at the Winter Garden Theater in the summer of 1979. Rouge performed as musicians as well as a variety of characters on stage. They toured Boston and Chicago, where the performances were made into the film Gilda Live directed by Mike Nichols.

=== Solo career ===
When the band parted ways, her first solo endeavor was an album with EMI, where she worked with producer John "Jellybean" Benitez. While working on the album, she was asked to sing the theme song for the 1984 film Body Rock, produced by Phil Ramone. It became an international hit, peaking at number No. 26 in Australia. Vidal toured around the world promoting it.

She appeared in the 1985 horror comedy film Once Bitten as a member of a high school band, and contributed two songs to the Once Bitten soundtrack.

Jimmy Iovine then signed Vidal as a solo artist to A&M Records after hearing her demo of "Do Me Right", which had been written and produced for her by Desmond. It became the first single off her 1987 self-titled debut solo album and was very popular internationally, especially in South America. The music video was directed by David Fincher.

In 1991, she sang a duet with Desmond Child on the Burt Bacharach/Desmond Child penned power ballad "Obsession". At the time, Vidal was making her third solo album with British-owned Charisma Records, but the album was never released.

As a singer, songwriter and producer, Vidal has contributed to many other artists' music.

Vidal contributed backup vocals to Kiss's Paul Stanley's solo album, Stevie Nicks' single "I Can't Wait" as well as a few other tracks from Nicks' solo album "Rock a Little", and was a featured vocalist for The Smithereens' single "A Girl Like You". She appears on many of Belinda Carlisle's solo albums, including the 1989 album "Runaway Horses". Other highlights include vocals for artists such as: Aerosmith, Seal, Celine Dion, Toto, Bette Midler and Cher. Vidal also appears on albums from Cat Stevens, and, most recently, Lana Del Rey.

As a songwriter, Vidal wrote the hit single "Summer Rain" for Belinda Carlisle, which was covered in 2004 by Slinkee Minx, as well as the title song to Carlisle's album "A Woman and a Man". The song "Angel", which she co-wrote (from her 1987 solo album), was also recorded by Exposé on their 1992 self-titled album. Vidal has written songs with Desmond Child, Billy Steinberg, and Rick Nowels, including Ace of Base single "Every Time it Rains" and Belinda Carlisle's "California."

As a studio vocal arranger and producer, Vidal has worked with a myriad of artists. Vidal's credits include Carrie Underwood and the other finalists on American Idol season 4.

In May 2009, Vidal announced the release of her album Living in Radical Radiance.

== Personal life ==
Vidal has a son with her husband Rick Nowels.

== Discography ==
=== Albums ===
- Maria Vidal (1987)
- Living in Radical Radiance (2009)

=== Singles ===
- 1979: "Our Love Is Insane" (as part of Desmond Child & Rouge)
- 1984: "Body Rock" – UK No. 11, AUS No. 26, US No. 48
- 1985: "Hands Off"
- 1986: "Just One Kiss"
- 1987: "Do Me Right"
- 1988: "Make Believe"
- 1991: "Obsession" (with Desmond Child)
- 2008: "Green" (non-album single)
