= Once Bitten (soundtrack) =

Once Bitten Soundtrack

Soundtrack album by Various Artists
- Released: 1985
- Length: 45:06
- Producer: MCA Records

The Once Bitten Soundtrack is a soundtrack album to Howard Storm's 1985 comedy horror film Once Bitten. It was released in 1985; the same year the movie was released. It was released on LP and Cassette Tape, and later remastered and released on CD.

The title song Once Bitten was written by Billy Steinberg and Tom Kelly as well as the Boston-based electronic rock band, 3-Speed featuring its frontwoman, Linda Chase. 3-Speed also performed that song title.

== Track listing ==
1. "Once Bitten" - 3-Speed
2. "The Picture" - Hubert Kah
3. "Face To Face" - Real Life
4. "People Living In Shadows" - Private Domain
5. "Blue Night Shadow" - Two Of Us
6. "Alive Or Dead" - Gifthorse
7. "Hands Off" - Maria Vidal
8. "Stop Talking About Us" - 3-Speed
9. "You're On My Mind" - Kevin McKnely
10. "Makes Me Crazy" - Moses Tyson Jr.
11. "Just One Kiss" - Maria Vidal
12. "Once Bitten (Main Title Theme)" - John Du Prez

=== Remastered version ===
1. "Once Bitten (Main Title Theme)" - John Du Prez
2. "Once Bitten" - 3-Speed
3. "The Picture" (Album Version) - Hubert Kah
4. "Face to Face" - Real Life
5. "People Living in Shadows" - Private Domain
6. "Blue Night Shadow" - Two of Us
7. "Alive or Dead" - Gifthorse
8. "Once Bitten (Parisian)" - John Du Prez
9. "Hands Off" - Maria Vidal
10. "Stop Talking About Us" - 3-Speed
11. "You're On My Mind" - Kevin McKnely
12. "Makes Me Crazy" - Moses Tyson Jr.
13. "Just One Kiss" - Maria Vidal
14. "Once Bitten (Rockin')" - John Du Prez
15. "Angel 07 (English Version)" - Hubert Kah
16. "Angel 07" - Hubert Kah
17. "Face to Face (Extended Mix)" - Real Life
18. "Just One Kiss" - Rick Springfield
19. "The Picture (Soundtrack Version)" - Hubert Kah
