= Electric Dreams (Slinkee Minx album) =

2007 Slinkee Minx album

Studio album by Slinkee Minx
- Released: 28 July 2007
- Genre: Dance; dance-pop; house
- Label: Central Station

Slinkee Minx chronology
Electric Dreams (2007)	Best (2008)

Electric Dreams is the debut album from the Australian all-female dance/house trio Slinkee Minx which was released on 28 July 2007. It is a two-disc album with 23 songs. All four of their hit singles are featured on the album, including "Summer Rain", "Closer", "Someday" and "Way of Life".

== Track listing ==
CD 1

No.	Title	Length
1.	"Summer Rain"	4:14
2.	"Falling Free"	4:13
3.	"Way of Life"	4:28
4.	"Every Little Thing"	4:16
5.	"Send Me An Angel"	4:19
6.	"Closer"	3:49
7.	"Hold Me"	4:22
8.	"Nu Love"	3:15
9.	"Think You're All That"	3:58
10.	"You Turn Me On"	3:52
11.	"Someday"	3:59
12.	"Dance Everybody"	3:59

CD 2

No.	Title	Length
1.	"Way of Life (Studio B Remix)"	7:35
2.	"Summer Rain (Zander Club Mix)"	7:11
3.	"Summer Rain (Alex K Klubbed Up Mix)"	6:08
4.	"Every Little Thing (mrTimothy Club Mix)"	7:23
5.	"Every Little Thing (mrTimothy Dub Mix)"	7:23
6.	"Careless Whisper (Radio Edit) (cover)"	4:09
7.	"U Could Be"	4:03
8.	"Feel the Vibe (Mike Felks Mix)"	7:42
9.	"Someday (Moustache D-Day Mix)"	7:04
10.	"Closer (Mike Felkes Club Mix)"	6:34
11.	"Someday Part II"	4:10

== Personnel ==
- Annemarie Failla
- Michelle Palmer
- Belinda Tartaglia
