= Howard Storm (director) =

American actor and director (1931–2026)

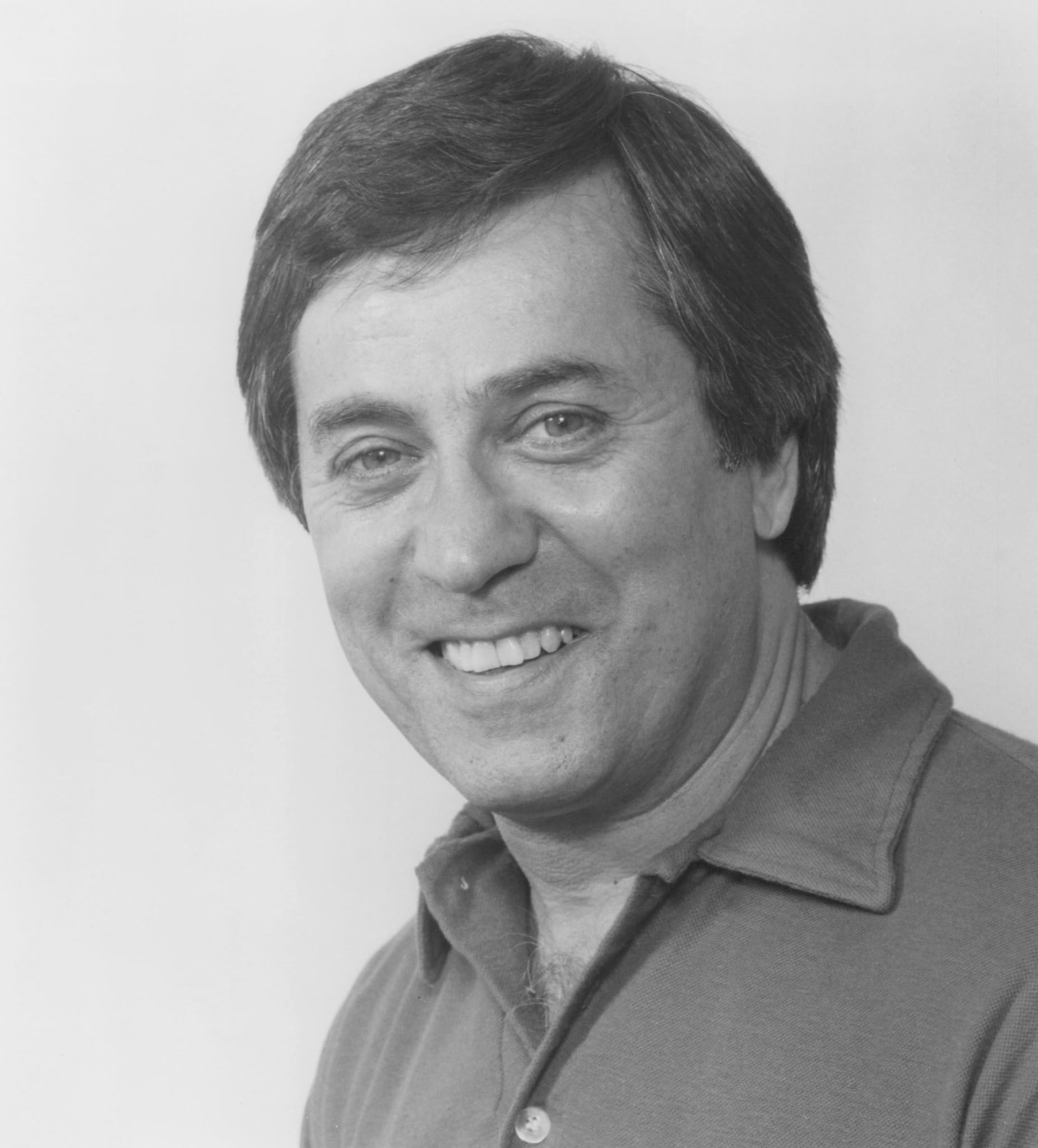
- Storm in 1985
- Born: Howard Sobel; December 11, 1931; New York City, U.S.
- Died: May 26, 2026 (aged 94); Beverly Hills, California, U.S.
- Occupations: Actor; director
- Years active: 1959–2026

Howard Sobel (December 11, 1931 – May 26, 2026), known professionally as Howard Storm, was an American actor and director.

== Career ==
Early in Storm's career he was a stand-up comedian. He traveled with Andy Williams as his comedian, performed in Las Vegas, and appeared 14 times on The Merv Griffin Show. His father was a comedian in burlesque. He also worked as a writer, teaming with attorney Paul Lichtman to write scripts for programs including The Partridge Family and Bob Newhart's program.

Storm's acting credits include The New Dick Van Dyke Show, Rhoda, and Sanford and Son, among other television series.

In 1975, he began his directing career, directing episodes of Laverne & Shirley, Busting Loose, Joanie Loves Chachi, Mork & Mindy, Taxi, The Redd Foxx Show, Full House, ALF, and Head of the Class, among other series. He was also Woody Allen's assistant/collaborator on Bananas and Everything You Always Wanted to Know About Sex* (*But Were Afraid to Ask).

In 1985, Storm directed his only feature film, Once Bitten, starring Lauren Hutton and Jim Carrey. In 2010, he made a small guest appearance in the film Valentine's Day.

== Death ==
Storm died at his home in Beverly Hills, California, on May 26, 2026, at the age of 94.
