= Slinkee Minx =

Australian dance act

- Origin: Melbourne, Australia
- Genres: Dance, dance-pop
- Years active: 2001–present
- Labels: Central Station, Dinky, AATW, Ultra Records, LNG, Xelon, Universal Music TV, Independent Artist
- Members: Annemarie Failla; Michelle Palmer
- Past members: Belinda Tartaglia (2001–2010)
- Website: Official website

Slinkee Minx (also known as Slinky Minx) are a dance act from Melbourne, Australia, who formed in 2001 and are best known for their 2004 cover of Belinda Carlisle's "Summer Rain", which debuted at No. 5 on the Australian ARIA Music Charts and No 1. on the DMC World Hard House Chart.

Slinkee Minx tracks have featured on over 100 compilation and dance albums across the globe. Of note, Slinkee Minx have featured on multiple Clubland compilation releases in the UK. Clubland are a series of compilation albums released by Universal Music TV, AATW.

The band released their debut album Electric Dreams in 2007 which contained the dance and mainstream chart hits "Summer Rain", "Closer", "Way of Life" and "Someday".

== Biography ==
=== 2001–2004: Early years ===
Annemare Failla, Michelle Palmer and Belinda Tartaglia made up the original Slinkee Minx lineup. The trio have similar backgrounds, all three were singing and dancing from a young age. Annemarie and Belinda met at a young age in primary school and from the age of 15 the two girls started writing and performing together. Annemarie and Michelle met working as editors of two highly successful online magazines. Michelle Palmer joined with Annemarie and Belinda in 2001 to form Slinkee Minx.

Musically in their early career Slinkee Minx stated they were influenced by artists such as Stevie Wonder, Jamiroquai, Modjo, George Michael, Kylie Minogue, Rogue Traders and Moloko.

The girls released a number of songs (as featuring artists, not credited) between 2001 and 2004 which featured on Compilation albums.

=== 2004–2009: Electric Dreams ===
Their first officially released single in 2004 "Summer Rain" reached #5 in the Aria Singles Chart, spent 14 weeks in the Aria top 40 charts including 5 weeks in the top 10 and spent 11 weeks at number one in the Australian ARIA Dance charts. In a 2004 interview with Zebra Magazine, Slinkee Minx stated that they decided to remake "Summer Rain" as it was an "old time favorite" song they all enjoyed.

"Summer Rain" was the 51st most broadcast song on Radio in Australia, was the 61st highest selling Australian single in 2004 and was the #1 highest selling dance single by any Australian Artist in 2004.

In an interview with "Sydney Unleashed", Slinkee Minx stated that after years of trying to get a break in the music industry they started sending their tracks out to various radio music directors and management companies and eventually Austereo began playing the track "Summer Rain".

"Summer Rain" was also accredited gold status by the Australian Recording Industry Association (ARIA) in 2004.

Their second single "Closer" was also a Top 10 ARIA Chart Dance hit and Top 40 Australian ARIA Music Chart Hit.

"Summer Rain", "Way of Life" and "Closer/Careless Whisper" were released in the US, UK, Asia and Europe across more than 50 countries. DJ Alex K remixes of Summer Rain appeared on multiple global club charts, dance charts and on various Compilation releases in the UK and Europe.

Slinkee Minx also performed at the 20th Anniversary SAFM Sky Show in Adelaide in front of approximately 150,000 people along with Guy Sebastian, one of the largest open-air concerts held in Australia in 2005.

Their third single "Someday" was also released in September 2005. In support of the release of "Someday" (which debuted at No. 9 on the ARIA Dance Charts and No. 55 on the ARIA Charts), the Slinkee Minx show toured in September and October 2005.

"Way of Life" released in June 2007 reached No. 13 on the Finnish Music Charts and No. 60 on the Australian Aria Physical Charts.

Their debut album, Electric Dreams, was released in July 2007, three years after the release of "Summer Rain". Described by Who Magazine as "wall to wall nightclub fairy-floss", the Album four years in the making contains 23 tracks over two discs. The Blurb stated that "A more apt title for Electric Dreams would have been ‘Electro House Orgasm’ - because that's just what it is".

Collaborating with some of the most prominent music writers and producers in Australia, the album features tracks written, co-written and produced by artists such as Josh G. Abrahams ("Falling Free", "Think You're All That"), Andy Love and Mr Timothy ("Way of Life"), Amba Shepherd ("Nu Love"), BJ Caruana ("You Turn Me On"), Danny Simcic ("Send Me An Angel") and Ivan Gough ("Someday", "Someday Part II").

In an interview with The Star Observer in 2007, Annemarie Failla stated that "Dance is something that comes naturally to us. We like different genres of music but for some reason writing dance tracks seems to come quite naturally to us." The Star Observer also noted that Slinkee Minx are often referred to as one of the "hardest-working female groups" in the industry.

Slinkee Minx performed in November 2007 at the first Fluffy Festival in Brisbane alongside acts such as Mr Timothy, Ricki-Lee, Potbelleez, TV Rock, Seany B and Vandalism.

The fifth and final single from the "Electric Dreams" album "Send me an Angel" was released in November 2007 under the Central Station Records label then re-released in February 2009 under the Xelon Records Label.

In November 2008, the closure of Central Station Records (owned by Destra) coincided with their release of the Album Best into Asian market. The album, Best, was released in early November 2008 in Asia and contains 15 tracks from the Slinkee Minx back catalog. Slinkee Minx signed with Xelon Entertainment in 2009.

==== UK and Europe ====
Continuing to gain respect in the dance scene in Europe and the UK, Slinkee Minx were noted as one of the most successful Australian Dance exports in the '00's, with tracks appearing on major dance compilation releases such as Clubland, Wild, Dinky and NRG/Kicking Hard.

"Summer Rain" also reached No 1. on the DMC World Hard House Chart, No. 3 on the UK Mainstream Charts, No. 14 on the Swedish dance charts and No. 25 on the Finnish dance charts.

"Way of Life" reached No. 13 on the Finnish Music Charts in 2007.

"Summer Rain" was featured on the successful Clubland 6 (UK Compilation Charts #2, Platinum Certification (Album)), Clubland 7 (UK Compilation Charts #1, Gold Certification (Album)) and Clubland Classixs (UK Compilation Charts #1, Silver Certification (Album)) compilation albums.

=== 2010–present: Single releases ===
Since 2010 Slinkee Minx have appeared regularly as feature artists on compilation albums including releases from Skitz Mix, Ultimate NRG and Clubland, which include remixes of releases from their back catalogue and other songs with Slinkee Minx appearing as featured artists.

In April 2010 in an interview with the Territorian News, Slinkee Minx announced that they had become a duo, with Belinda Tartaglia departing the group.

In the UK, Clubland Smashed, which includes the track "Luvstruck / Summer Rain" by Dancing DJs vs Slinkee Minx, reached number one on the UK Dance Albums Chart in 2010.

Slinkee Minx released their first single in three years, "Lift Me Up", on 9 October 2015, with the forthcoming EP New World due for release in 2016.

"Lift Me Up" was produced by James Ash from the Rogue Traders.

In an interview with Melbourne radio station Joy FM, the duo confirmed that they had spent the last few years in the studio writing and recording for their forthcoming EP release along with collaborating on a number of side music projects, working with some of Australiaís top dance producers.

The Slinkee Minx version of "Summer Rain" is known to have at least 25 remixes since it was released in 2004. "Summer Rain" continues to chart across the globe, with the Alex K remix of the Slinkee Minx song recently reaching #54 on the iTunes UK Fitness & Workout Songs Charts in October 2015.

In 2015 the UK's "Itcher Magazine" rated Slinkee Minx as one of the "Best Australian Girl Bands", describing their music as "Stunning vocals cascading over layers of electronic wizardry".

In January 2016 Slinkee Minx performed live for the first time in four years at the Midsumma Festival in Melbourne, Australia.

In September 2016, Slinkee Minx released a remake of Summer Rain, titled "Summer Rain 2016". In 2016 and 2017, Slinkee Minx released a number of remix packages including "Lift Me Up remixes" and the EP "Summer Rain (17 Remixes)", which reached #25 on the Australian iTunes Dance Album Charts in July 2017. "Summer Rain" was also featured on the compilation CD "Music Wars – 40 Years of Central Station Records". The book with the same name covers the story of Central Station Records and its role in Australia's electronic dance music scene from the '70s to present. The single "Another Time" was also released later in 2017. In 2020 Slinkee Minx released the single "Another Time"

2023 has seen the release of two songs including "We Can Make It" and their latest release "I Can Feel U" in November 2023.

=== Philanthropy ===
Since 2004 Slinkee Minx have supported various causes including the RCH Good Friday Appeal (performance and appearance 2005), Rainbow Alliance for Asia (performance 2005), UnitingCare's Gift Appeal Launch (2005), Haven Foundation (performance 2005), JOY FM/AIDS Day Benefit Concert (performance 2006), Young Variety (performance 2007), JOY FM/World AIDS Day Concert (performance 2007), World Vision Charity Concert (performance 2007), Variety Gold Coast Annual Ball (performance 2008), the Bushfire Appeal Benefit Concert (2009), The Alannah & Madeline Foundation's 'Purple Nights' Event (performance), HelpOut Tsunami Benefit Concert (performance), Reach Foundation Ball (performance) and the Lighthouse Foundation Gala Dinner (performance).

== Discography ==
=== Albums ===
Title	Year
Electric Dreams	2007
Best (Asian release)	2008

=== Singles ===
List of singles, with selected peak chart positions
Title	Year	Peak chart positions	Certifications	Album
Title	Year	AUS	Certifications	Album
"Summer Rain"	2004	5	ARIA: Gold	Electric Dreams
"Closer"	2004	39		Electric Dreams
"Someday"	2005	55		Electric Dreams
"Way of Life"	2007	60		Electric Dreams
"Send Me an Angel"	2007	—		Electric Dreams
"Lift Me Up"	2015	—		Non-album singles
"Summer Rain 2016"	2016	—		Non-album singles
"Another Night (Reloaded)" (featuring Slinkee Minx)	2016	—		Non-album singles
"Summer Rain '17" (Remixes)	2017	—		Non-album singles
"Another Time"	2017	—		Non-album singles
"Another Time" (Serbsican Summer '20 Remix)	2020	—		Non-album singles
"We Can Make It"	2023	—		Non-album singles
"I Can Feel U"	2023	—		Non-album singles

=== Compilation appearances ===
Year	Title	Album
2004	"Summer Rain (Alex K Remix)"	Clubland 6
2004	"Summer Rain"	Floorfillers II
2004	"Someday (NRGize Mix)"	Dinky 100th Edition
2005	"Summer Rain (Alex K Remix)"	Clubland 7
2005	Closer	Wild Nights 4
2005	"Closer" / "Summer Rain (KCB Remix)"	Wild Summer 2005
2005	"Careless Whisper"	Dream Dance 2005
2006	"Summer Rain (Alex K Mix)"	Ultimate NRG
2006	"Someday (Nrgize Mix)"	Kickin' Hard 8
2006	"Someday"	Wild Summer 2006
2007	"Summer Rain"	Video Hits – 20 Years of Australian Hits
2008	"Summer Rain (Alex K Mix)"	Ultimate NRG 3
2008	"Send Me an Angel (Weaver Mix)"	Ultimate Hardcore III
2008	"Summer Rain (Alex K Mix)"	Clubland Classix (The Album Of Your Life)
2008	"Summer Rain (Zander Edit)"	Dinky NRG Anthems
2008	"Way of Life (Studio B Mix)"	Electronic Kingdom 10
2009	"Summer Rain (Alex K Remix)"	Ultimate NRG Megamix
2010	"Luvstruck" / "Summer Rain" (with Dancing DJS / Friday Night Posse)	Clubland Smashed
2010	"Summer Rain"	100% Hits: 20th Anniversary Collection
2010	"Summer Rain (Radio Edit)"	101 Floorfillers
2012	"Summer Rain (Alex K Radio Edit)"	Ultimate Clubland - A Decade in Dance
2012	"Feel the Vibe (Mike Felks remix)"	E! House
2012	"Turn It Up (Beatz Junkies extended mix)" (Digital Punks featuring Slinkee Minx)	My House Is Your House Volume 5
2014	"Summer Rain (Alex K Radio Edit)"	Clubland Bounce
2014	"Summer Rain (Alex K Remix Edit)"	NRG Workout
2016	"Another Night" (Platinum DJs featuring Slinkee Minx)	Skitzmix 51
2016	"Summer Rain (Alex K Remix Edit)"	100% Clubland
2016	"Summer Rain (Alex K Remix Edit)"	Ultimate NRG - Best of 1996-2016 (Mixed by Alex K)
2017	"Summer Rain"	Music Wars: 40 Years of Central Station Records

== Television appearances / DVD releases ==
Television / DVD releases / Film clips
Year	Title	Role	Notes
2004-	"Summer Rain" film clip	Performance	Various TV and DVDs
2004-	"Closer" film clip	Performance	Various TV and DVDs
2005	Good Morning Australia	Live performance	Channel 10, Aus
2005	Mornings with Kerrie-Anne	Live performance	Channel 9, Aus
2005	Good Friday Appeal Channel 7	Live performance/guest appearance	Channel 7, VIC, Aus
2005	Now Vision 2005 - Volume 1	Filmclip - "Summer Rain" - clip 4	EMI Music, Aus
2005	Hits for Kids 2005	Filmclip - "Summer Rain"	Sony Music/Universal Music, Aus
2006	30 Years of Central Station Records: The History of Dance Music in Australia	Filmclip - "Summer Rain"	Various, Aus
2006	Floorfillers (EMI)	Filmclip - "Summer Rain"	Various, Aus
2006	SkitzMix 24	Filmclip - "Summer Rain"	Various, Aus
2007	Mornings with Kerri-Anne	Live performance	Channel 9, Aus
2007	Today Show	Live performance/guest appearance	Channel 9, Aus
2007	The Scene TV	Performance, "Way of Life"	Channel 9, Aus
2007-	"Send Me an Angel" film clip	Performance	Various TV and DVDs
2007-	Groovedelicious	Segment - as themselves	Channel 9, Aus
2008	Q View, Bent TV	Appearance	Channel 31, Aus
2017	"Lift Me Up"	Film clip	Various, Aus
