= Alex Karbouris =

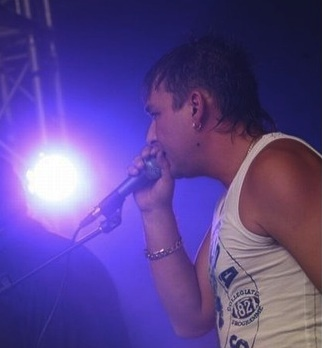
- Alex K live @ Klubbed 2011, Sydney, Australia

Background information
- Born: Alexander Karbouris; 29 November 1979 (age 46); Sydney
- Genres: NRG, pop, house
- Occupations: Songwriter, singer, producer, DJ
- Years active: 1996–present
- Labels: UMTV, All Around the World, Central Station Records, Hit After Hit
- Website: alexkmusic.com

Alex Karbouris, known professionally as Alex K, is an Australian music producer, singer, songwriter and DJ. He is known for being one of the pioneers of the music genre 'NRG', and his Ultimate NRG and Kickin Hard compilations. He has sold over 600,000 albums worldwide, and has remixed and written for over 200 artists across the globe. Karbouris is one of Australia's highest selling hard dance exports.

== Biography ==
=== 1996–2004: Early life and career ===
Originally beginning his career in 1994 at community radio station 99.3FM, he joined Australian radio station, Wild FM, and was responsible for numerous megamixes that featured on the Wild CD compilations. He signed with Central Station Records in 1998, and released the first of many compilations titled Kickin Hard, under the alias 'Alex K'.

=== 2004–2011: Ultimate NRG ===
Karbouris moved from his hometown Sydney, Australia to Liverpool, UK in 2004, and signed a record deal with Universal/AATW. Despite the 'NRG' scene being viewed in the wider industry as a regional phenomena, largely assumed to be confined to the North West, Ultimate NRG 1, 2, 3, 4, 5 and Ultimate NRG Megamix all achieved gold status in the UK, with over 600,000 sales. Karbouris has had several chart hits with his productions, including "If you were mine", "Rise Again", and "Moving too fast". He has written and worked with many writers and producers, and had writing credits alongside Annie Lennox with his track "Angel in my heart".

His song "My Time", was featured and looped in the freeway chase scene of the movie Hancock in 2008.

He has remixed numerous mainstream and underground artists, including the Black Eyed Peas, Rihanna, Snoop Dogg, Lady Gaga, Nicole Scherzinger, Slinkee Minx and David Guetta.

== Personal life ==
His grandfather was Lee Gallagher, who formed the GTV-9 Showband and featured on the Graham Kennedy Show. His auntie is Greek actress Marilena Karbouri, most known from the series Xehase Me. Karbouris currently resides in Sydney, Australia, but tours Europe frequently.

== Discography ==
Title	Year	Peak chart positions			
Title	Year	AUS	NZ	UK	US
Kickin' Hard 1	1998	2	—	—	—
Kickin' Hard 2	2000	2	—	—	—
Kickin' Hard 3	2001	1	—	—	—
Kickin' Hard 4	2002	2	—	—	—
Kickin' Hard 5	2003	1	—	—	—
Kickin' Hard 6	2004	2	—	—	—
North Vs South	2004	—	—	—	—
Ultimate NRG 1	2006	—	—	1	—
Klubbed vol. 1	2006	10	—	—	—
Ultimate NRG 2	2007	—	—	1	—
Klubbed vol. 2	2007	3	—	—	—
Ultimate NRG 3	2008	—	—	1	—
Ultimate NRG 4	2009	8	—	2	—
Ultimate NRG Megamix	2010	—	—	2	—
Ultimate NRG 5	2011	3	—	2	—
Kickin Hard 11	2011	—	—	—	—
Alex K - Past 2 Present	2012	17	—	—	—
Maximum NRG	2013	8	—	—	—
Alex K - Unreleased	2014	3	—	—	—
"—" denotes album that did not chart or was not released
