= Nightbird (song) =

Single by Stevie Nicks

from the album The Wild Heart
- B-side: "Gate and Garden"
- Released: November 30, 1983
- Recorded: 1983
- Length: 4:59
- Label: Modern
- Songwriters: Stevie Nicks; Sandy Stewart
- Producer: Jimmy Iovine

Stevie Nicks singles chronology
| "If Anyone Falls" (1983) | "Nightbird" (1983) | "Talk to Me" (1985) |

"Nightbird" is a 1983 song by the American singer-songwriter Stevie Nicks, written by Nicks with Sandy Stewart. It was the third single from Nicks's second solo album, The Wild Heart. The song, a duet with Stewart, peaked at No. 33 on the Billboard Hot 100 on January 28, 1984 and reached No. 32 spot on the Billboard Top Rock Tracks chart. The song also reached No. 39 on the U.S. Adult Contemporary Chart.

== Background ==
The song was written as a continuation of themes explored in "Edge of Seventeen," namely "the difficulties of female rock 'n' roll singers." In a 1983 MTV interview, Nicks said "Nightbird" was her favorite song from the new album.

== Reception ==
Cash Box said that "a stark keyboard and guitar intro, together with Nicks’ tired, low-ranged croak, provide a melancholic setting depicting the approach of winter and night." Billboard wrote that the song's "highly stylized delivery and cryptic lyrics enhance[d] the singer's considerable mystique."

== Charts ==
| Chart (1983) | Peak position |
|---|---|
| U.S. Billboard Mainstream Rock Singles | 32 |
| U.S. Billboard Hot 100 | 33 |
| U.S. Billboard Adult Contemporary Chart | 39 |

== Notes and references ==
- Timespace – The Best of Stevie Nicks, liner notes
- Crystal Visions – The Very Best of Stevie Nicks, liner notes and commentary
