= The Wild Heart (album) =

1983 studio album by Stevie Nicks

Studio album by Stevie Nicks
- Released: June 10, 1983
- Recorded: Autumn 1982 – Spring 1983
- Studios: Goodnight Dallas, Dallas; Record Plant, Los Angeles; Record Plant, New York City; Studio 55, Los Angeles; The Hit Factory, New York City; A & R Recording, New York City
- Genres: Rock; pop rock; synth rock
- Length: 44:27
- Label: Modern
- Producers: Jimmy Iovine; Gordon Perry; Tom Petty

Stevie Nicks chronology
Bella Donna (1981)	The Wild Heart (1983)	Rock a Little (1985)

Singles from The Wild Heart
- 1. "Stand Back" Released: May 19, 1983; 2. "If Anyone Falls" Released: September 3, 1983; 3. "Nightbird" Released: November 30, 1983

The Wild Heart is the second solo studio album by American singer-songwriter Stevie Nicks. Recording began in late 1982, shortly after the end of Fleetwood Mac's Mirage Tour. After the death of her best friend, Robin Anderson, and with new appreciation for her life and career, Nicks recorded the album in only a few months and was released on June 10, 1983, a year after Fleetwood Mac's Mirage album. It peaked at number five on the US Billboard 200 (for seven consecutive weeks) and achieved platinum status on September 12, 1983. The album has shipped 2 million copies in the US alone.

== Overview ==
The album is notable for its array of prominent guest musicians. Tom Petty made a return to write "I Will Run to You", on which his bandmates from The Heartbreakers performed. Nicks' Fleetwood Mac bandmate, Mick Fleetwood, made an appearance on the track "Sable on Blonde". Toto's Steve Lukather contributed some of the guitar work on what would become the album's biggest hit single, "Stand Back", which also features an uncredited contribution from Prince, who played the synthesizer track. Nicks also worked with friend Sandy Stewart, who wrote the music for three tracks on the album and performed on several (Stewart would go on to write the 1987 Fleetwood Mac hit "Seven Wonders"). The album's final track, "Beauty and the Beast", features a full string section performing a score arranged and conducted by Paul Buckmaster. Nicks had recorded various other tracks prior to the album's release, including "Violet and Blue" which was featured on the movie soundtrack for Against All Odds, and later on Nicks' 3-disc retrospective box set Enchanted in 1998.

The Wild Heart was certified platinum by the Recording Industry Association of America (RIAA) within months of its release. Ten years later, it received a double platinum certification in 1993, denoting shipments in excess of two million copies in the United States. It spent a whole year on the Billboard 200 from June 1983 to June 1984. It has also been certified silver by the British Phonographic Industry (BPI) for shipments in excess of 60,000 in the United Kingdom. Three singles were released from the album: "Stand Back", which charted at number five; "If Anyone Falls", which charted at number 14; and "Nightbird", which charted at number 33. "Stand Back" and "If Anyone Falls" featured accompanying music videos that went into heavy rotation on MTV. "Nightbird", a track that Nicks has said was her favorite on the album, was performed live on Solid Gold and Saturday Night Live.

On November 4th, 2016, Rhino released a 2-CD deluxe edition of the album that featured a remastered version of the album, along with unreleased tracks, alternate versions, and other bonus material. The remastered original album was also issued on CD and LP formats.

== Critical reception ==
Professional ratings
Review scores
Source	Rating
AllMusic	4/5 stars
The Rolling Stone Album Guide	3/5 stars
Rolling Stone	2/5 stars

Cashbox called The Wild Heart a "highly polished effort" that "firmly establishes an identity outside of Fleetwood Mac for Nicks". They labeled "Stand Back", "Gate and Garden", "I Will Run To You", and "Beauty and the Beast" as the album's highlights. Billboard characterized The Wild Heart as a "harder rocking" album compared to her first solo album, Bella Donna, citing "Stand Back" and "Enchanted" as examples of this approach. They said that The Wild Heart also included songs that catered to adult contemporary markets, including "Nightbird" and "Sable on Blond".

William Ruhlmann of AllMusic found that The Wild Heart "contained nothing that would disturb fans of her previous work and much that echoed it." He observed that, as on her previous album, producer Jimmy Iovine took a "simpler, more conventional pop/rock approach to the arrangements" than Lindsey Buckingham did on Nicks' songs, making the music "more straightforward than her typically elliptical lyrics." He concluded by saying that: "if you loved Bella Donna, you would like The Wild Heart very much."

== Track listing ==
All tracks are written by Stevie Nicks, except where noted.

Side one
No.	Title	Writer(s)	Length
1.	"Wild Heart"		6:08
2.	"If Anyone Falls"	Nicks; Sandy Stewart	4:07
3.	"Gate and Garden"		4:05
4.	"Enchanted"		3:05
5.	"Nightbird" (duet with Sandy Stewart)	Nicks; Stewart	4:59

Side two
No.	Title	Writer(s)	Length
1.	"Stand Back"		4:48
2.	"I Will Run to You" (duet with Tom Petty and the Heartbreakers)	Tom Petty	3:21
3.	"Nothing Ever Changes"	Nicks; Stewart	4:09
4.	"Sable on Blond"		4:13
5.	"Beauty and the Beast"		6:02
Total length:			44:27

Deluxe edition

Released on November 4, 2016, this edition features remastered audio and consists of two discs, divided into: the original album and unreleased tracks, alternate versions and other bonus content. The information on disc two has been adapted from the Rhino website and the deluxe edition CD's liner notes.

All tracks are written by Stevie Nicks, except where noted.

Disc two: Bonus tracks
No.	Title	Writer(s)	Length
1.	"Violet and Blue" (from the Against All Odds soundtrack)		5:04
2.	"I Sing for the Things" (unreleased version)		4:40
3.	"Sable on Blond" (alternate version)		7:36
4.	"All the Beautiful Worlds" (unreleased version)		5:40
5.	"Sorcerer" (unreleased version)		5:35
6.	"Dial the Number" (unreleased version)	Nicks; Sandy Stewart	4:29
7.	"Garbo" (B-side of "Stand Back")		3:31
8.	"Are You Mine" (demo)		3:10
9.	"Wild Heart" (session)		6:36
Total length:			46:21

== Personnel ==
Adapted from the album's liner notes.

Musicians

- Stevie Nicks – lead vocals, backing vocals
- Sharon Celani; Lori Perry – backing vocals
- Sandy Stewart – synthesizer (1, 3, 5, 6, 8, 9), keyboards (3), piano solo (5), co-lead vocals (5), additional background vocals (5)
- Russ Kunkel – drums (2, 4, 8), drum overdubs (6)
- Roy Bittan – synthesizer (2), piano (4, 8–10)
- Waddy Wachtel – guitar (2–6, 9)
- Bob Glaub – bass guitar (2, 4, 8)
- Bobbye Hall – percussion (2, 4, 6, 8)
- Benmont Tench – organ (3–5), keyboards (7)

Additional musicians

- David Monday – guitar (1, 3)
- Roger Tausz – bass guitar (1)
- Brad Smith – drums (1, 3), percussion (1, 3)
- Dean Parks – guitar (1)
- Carolyn Brooks – additional background vocals (2, 10)
- Kenny Edwards – bass guitar (5, 9)
- Chet McCracken – drum overdubs (5)
- David Foster – piano (5)
- Marvin Caruso – drums (5, 6)
- David Williams – guitar (6)

- Ian Wallace – percussion (6)
- Steve Lukather – guitar (6)
- Tom Petty – guitar (7), co-lead vocals (7), backing vocals (7)
- Mike Campbell – guitar (7)
- Stan Lynch – drums (7)
- Howie Epstein – bass guitar (7)
- Don Felder – guitar (8)
- Phil Kenzie – saxophone (8)
- Mick Fleetwood – drums (9)

"Beauty and the Beast" strings

- Paul Buckmaster – conductor
- Gene Bianco – harp
- John Beal – double bass
- Jesse Levine; Julien Barber; Theodore Israel; Harry Zaratzian – violas
- Jesse Levy; Frederick Zlotkin; Seymour Barab; Jon Abramowitz – cellos

Violins

- Marvin Morgenstern
- John Pintavalle
- Regis Eandiorio
- Peter Dimitriades
- Matthew Raimondi
- Raymond Kunicki
- Ruth Waterman

- Herbert Sorkin
- Max Ellen
- Harry Glickman
- Paul Winter
- Harry Cykman
- Lewis Eley
- Paul Gershman

Production

- Jimmy Iovine – producer
- Tom Petty; Jimmy Iovine – producers (7)
- Gordon Perry; Jimmy Iovine – producers (1, 3)
- Shelly Yakus – engineer
- Tom "Gordo" Gondolf – engineer (1, 3)
- Greg Edward – additional engineering
- Shelly Yakus; Greg Edward; Lori Perry – mixing (1, 3)
- Stephen Marcussen – mastering (at Precision Lacquer)
- Paul Buckmaster; Kenneth Whitfield – strings arrangement (10)
- David Bluefield – OB-Xa and DMX drum machine programming (5, 6)
- Janet Weber – production coordinator
- Rebecca Alvarez – personal assistant
- Front Line Management – direction

Assistant engineers

- Michael Brooks
- David Bianco
- Bobby Cohen
- Julian Stoll
- Bill Freesh
- David Dubow
- Pete Kudas
- John Smith
- John Curcio
- Josh Abbey

Artwork

- Herbert W. Worthington III – photography, art direction, design, album cover concept
- Stevie Nicks – album cover concept, handtinting
- Sulamith Wulfing – album cover inspiration
- Robert Alfrod; Michael Marks – photography assistants
- Lori Perry – handtinting
- Mike Manoogian – logo design
- Michael Curtis – layout design
- Beverlee Vance – haircut
- Jim Fisher – front cover hair design
- Margi Kent – clothes
- Mardiros Vartanian – boots ("All Summer Long")
- Christi Thomason – front cover and small insert make-up
- Liza Edwards – back cover and large insert make-up
- Kathryn Greenbaum – hands

== Charts ==
=== Weekly charts ===
Weekly chart performance for The Wild Heart
Chart (1983)	Peak position
Australian Albums (Kent Music Report)	8
Canada Top Albums/CDs (RPM)	7
Dutch Albums (Album Top 100)	13
German Albums (Offizielle Top 100)	25
Icelandic Albums (Tónlist)	5
New Zealand Albums (RMNZ)	17
Swedish Albums (Sverigetopplistan)	19
UK Albums (Official Charts)	28
US Billboard 200	5
US Rock Albums (Billboard)	3
US Cash Box Top 200 Albums	5

=== Year-end charts ===
Year-end chart performance for The Wild Heart
Chart (1983)	Position
Australian Albums (Kent Music Report)	38
Canada Top Albums/CDs (RPM)	39
US Billboard 200	80
US Cash Box Top 200 Albums	12

== Certifications ==
Certifications for The Wild Heart
Region	Certification	Certified units/sales
Canada (Music Canada)	Platinum	100,000^{^}
United Kingdom (BPI)	Silver	60,000^{^}
United States (RIAA)	2× Platinum	2,000,000^{^}
^{^} Shipments figures based on certification alone.

== Tour ==
Nicks went on a national tour in support of The Wild Heart. After headlining the massive US Festival on May 30, 1983, in San Bernardino, California, the tour officially started in Knoxville, Tennessee, on June 21, 1983, and ended in Ames, Iowa, on November 20, 1983.

Setlist

- "Gold Dust Woman"
- "Outside the Rain"
- "Dreams"
- "Gold and Braid" (see notes below)
- "I Need to Know"
- "Sara"
- "Angel" (see notes below)
- "Enchanted" (see notes below)
- "If Anyone Falls"
- "Leather and Lace"
- "Stand Back"
- "Beauty and the Beast"
- "Gypsy"
- "How Still My Love"
- "I Will Run to You" (see notes below)
- "Stop Draggin' My Heart Around"
- "Edge of Seventeen"

Encore

- "Rhiannon"

Notes

- "Enchanted" was performed only at the Meadowlands Arena in East Rutherford, New Jersey, on June 24, 1983.
- "Angel" and "Gold and Braid" were performed only on the opening night at the US Festival.
- "I Will Run to You" was performed at Radio City Music Hall in New York City with Tom Petty.

=== Dates ===
- May 28 – Las Vegas, Nevada, Aladdin Theatre for the Performing Arts
- May 30 – San Bernardino, California, Devore Park/US Festival II
- June 21 – Knoxville, Tennessee, Civic Coliseum
- June 23 – Norfolk, Virginia, The Scope
- June 24 – East Rutherford, New Jersey, Meadowlands Arena
- June 27 – Philadelphia, Pennsylvania, The Spectrum
- June 28 – Pittsburgh, Pennsylvania, Civic Arena
- July 2 – Buffalo, New York, War Memorial
- July 3 – Hartford, Connecticut, Hartford Civic Center
- July 6 – Worcester, Massachusetts, Centrum
- July 7 – Landover, Maryland, Capitol Center
- July 10 – Greensboro, North Carolina, Coliseum
- July 11 – Atlanta, Georgia, The Omni
- July 14 – Kansas City, Missouri, Kemper Arena
- July 15 – Minneapolis, Minnesota, Met Center
- July 17 – Chicago, Illinois Rosemont, Horizon
- July 18 – Chicago, Illinois Rosemont, Horizon
- July 19 – Toronto, Ontario, Canada CNE, Bandshell
- July 21 – Cuyahoga Falls, Ohio Blossom, Music Center
- July 22 – Cuyahoga Falls, Ohio Blossom, Music Center
- July 23 – Detroit, Michigan, Joe Louis Arena
- July 26 – St. Louis, Missouri, Checkerdome
- July 27 – Indianapolis, Indiana, Market Square Arena
- July 30 – Alpine Valley, Wisconsin, Music Theatre
- July 31 – Cincinnati, Ohio, Riverfront Coliseum
- August 31 – Austin, Texas, Frank Erwin Center
- September 5 – Dallas, Texas, Reunion Arena
- September 9 – Bristol, Rhode Island, Colt State Park
- September 12 – New York, Radio City Music Hall
- September 13 – New York, Radio City Music Hall
- September 17 – Oklahoma City, Oklahoma, Oklahoma Myriad
- September 24 – Irvine, California, Irvine Meadows Amphitheatre
- September 25 – Tempe, Arizona, Compton Terrace
- October 2 – Los Angeles, California, Inglewood Forum
- October 4 – Oakland, California, Oakland Coliseum
- October 21 – Columbia, South Carolina, Carolina Coliseum
- October 22 – Columbia, South Carolina, Carolina Coliseum
- October 25 – Charleston, West Virginia, Charleston Civic Center
- October 26 – Roanoke, Virginia, Roanoke Civic Center
- October 29 – Tuscaloosa, Alabama, University of Alabama
- October 30 – Jackson, Mississippi, Mississippi Coliseum
- November 2 – Jacksonville, Florida, Memorial Coliseum
- November 4 – Lakeland, Florida, Lakeland Civic Center
- November 5 – Miami, Florida, Sportatorium
- November 8 – Columbia, Missouri, University of Missouri
- November 9 – Starkville, Mississippi, Mississippi State University
- November 12 – Tulsa, Oklahoma, Assembly Center
- November 13 – Little Rock, Arkansas, T.H. Barton Coliseum
- November 16 – Madison, Wisconsin, Dane County Arena
- November 19 – Iowa City, Iowa, University of Iowa
- November 20 – Ames, Iowa, Iowa State University
- November 23 – Charlotte, North Carolina, Charlotte Coliseum
- November 24 – Columbia, South Carolina, Carolina Coliseum
