= Summer Rain (Belinda Carlisle song) =

1990 single by Belinda Carlisle

Single by Belinda Carlisle

from the album Runaway Horses
- B-side: "Leave a Light On"
- Released: January 1990
- Genre: Pop
- Length: 5:25
- Label: MCA
- Songwriters: Robbie Seidman, Maria Vidal
- Producer: Rick Nowels

Belinda Carlisle singles chronology
"La Luna" (1989)	"Summer Rain" (1990)	"Runaway Horses" (1990)

Music video
- "Summer Rain" on YouTube

"Summer Rain" is a song written by Robbie Seidman and Maria Vidal, produced by Rick Nowels for American singer Belinda Carlisle's third album, Runaway Horses (1989). The power ballad was released around the world throughout 1990; it served as the album's second single in the United States, the fourth single in Japan, the sixth single in the United Kingdom, and the third single elsewhere.

Commercially, "Summer Rain" reached the top 30 in the United States and the United Kingdom. In Australia, it entered the top 10, peaking at number six. It was later covered by artists including Slinkee Minx, whose 2004 cover version charted higher than the original in Australia, reaching number five. Carlisle stated in May 2013 that "Summer Rain" was her favorite song from her recording career.

== Release and commercial performance ==
"Summer Rain" achieved moderate commercial success in North America, where it was released as the second single from Runaway Horses (1989). In January 1990, the song entered the Billboard Hot 100, the main US chart, at number 86. Within seven weeks of its release, it peaked at number 30 and stayed at that position for two weeks. The single spent 13 weeks on the Billboard Hot 100, six of which were in the top 50. The single was Carlisle's second to last song to chart on the Billboard Hot 100. It also peaked at number 29 on the US Billboard Adult Contemporary chart, where it spent eight weeks on the chart.

In Australia, the song had the most commercial success, where it was released as the album's third single on March 19, 1990. In early April 1990, it debuted at number 42. Within two months of its release, it reached the top 10, where it stayed for five weeks. The song reached a peak at number six on May 20 and remained there for two more weeks, spending a total of 16 weeks in the top 50. It became the 40th highest-selling single in Australia for 1990.

The song was released in the United Kingdom in December 1990 as the sixth and final release from Runaway Horses, peaking at number 23 at the end of January 1991 and spending 10 weeks in the chart.

== Music video ==
The official music video for the song was directed by Andy Morahan.

== Track listing ==
CD single

1. "Summer Rain" (single mix)
2. "Summer Rain" (Justin Strauss Mix)
3. "Leave a Light On" (Kamikazee mix)

== Personnel ==
- Bekka Bramlett – background vocals
- Paul Buckmaster – string arrangement
- Donna De Lory – background vocals
- X.Y. Jones – guitar
- Charles Judge – keyboards
- John Pierce – bass
- Maria Vidal – background vocals

== Charts ==
=== Weekly charts ===
Chart (1990–1991)	Peak position
Australia (ARIA)	6
Canada Top Singles (RPM)	22
Canada Adult Contemporary (RPM)	25
Europe (Eurochart Hot 100)	64
European Airplay (Music & Media)	25
Germany (GfK)	57
Ireland (IRMA)	26
Luxembourg (Radio Luxembourg)	20
Quebec (ADISQ)	17
UK Singles (Official Charts)	23
US Billboard Hot 100	30
US Adult Contemporary (Billboard)	29
US Cash Box Top 100 Singles	36

=== Year-end charts ===
Chart (1990)	Position
Australia (ARIA)	40

== Certifications ==
Region	Certification	Certified units/sales
Australia (ARIA)	Gold	35,000^{^}
^{^} Shipments figures based on certification alone.

== Release history ==
Region	Date	Format(s)	Label(s)	Ref.
United States	January 1990	7-inch vinyl; 12-inch vinyl; cassette	MCA	
Australia	March 19, 1990	7-inch vinyl; 12-inch vinyl; CD; cassette	Virgin	
Japan	March 21, 1990	Mini-CD	Virgin	
United Kingdom	December 1990	7-inch vinyl; 12-inch vinyl; CD; cassette	Virgin	

== Slinkee Minx version ==
"Summer Rain"

Single by Slinkee Minx

from the album Electric Dreams
- Released: August 9, 2004
- Length: 4:15
- Label: Central Station
- Songwriters: Robbie Seidman, Maria Vidal
- Producer: George Papapetros

Slinkee Minx singles chronology
"Summer Rain" (2004)	"Closer" (2004)

"Summer Rain" was covered by Australian dance act Slinkee Minx in 2004 for their first album, Electric Dreams (2007). It was the first song released from the album, and was released in Australia on August 9, 2004, as a CD single. The song was released under the record label Central Station and was produced by Mike Felks.

The song made its debut on the singles chart at number five, hitting the top spot on the dance chart, knocking off "Push Up" by the Freestylers. In its second week, it fell out of the top ten to number eleven but jumped back into the top ten, staying there for four more weeks. It spent fifteen weeks in the top fifty and eighteen weeks in the top one hundred, becoming the sixty-first highest selling single in Australia for 2004 and was accredited gold by ARIA. "Summer Rain" was released to clubs in more than fifty countries including the US, UK and other countries in Europe.

=== Music video ===
A music video was produced to promote the single.

=== Track listings ===
CD single

1. "Summer Rain" (radio edit) – 4:15
2. "Summer Rain" (Zander radio edit) – 4:08
3. "Summer Rain" (KCB remix) – 7:57
4. "Summer Rain" (Zander club mix) – 7:11
5. "Tell Me" (radio edit) – 4:34

UK CD single (All Around the World CDGLOBE395)

1. "Summer Rain" (Alex K radio edit) – 3:54
2. "Summer Rain" (Alex K remix) – 6:07
3. "Summer Rain" (Clubstar remix) – 6:36
4. "Summer Rain" (KB Project remix) – 5:29
5. "Summer Rain" (Lee S remix) – 6:14
6. "Summer Rain" (Friday Night Posse remix) – 6:36

=== Charts ===
==== Weekly charts ====
Chart (2004)	Peak position
Australia (ARIA)	5
Australian Dance (ARIA)	1

==== Year-end charts ====
Chart (2004)	Position
Australia (ARIA)	61
Australian Dance (ARIA)	5

=== Certifications ===
Region	Certification	Certified units/sales
Australia (ARIA)	Gold	35,000^{^}
^{^} Shipments figures based on certification alone.

== Groove Coverage version ==
Groove Coverage, a German dance act, released their version of the song in 2007.

=== Track listing ===
CD single

1. "Summer Rain" – 3:59
2. "Summer Rain" (extended version) – 4:58
3. "Summer Rain" (Rob Mayth extended) – 6:24
4. "Summer Rain" (Rob Mayth radio) – 3:45
5. "Summer Rain" (Delaction remix) – 6:03

== Matt Fishel version ==
In 2014, "Summer Rain" was recorded by British singer Matt Fishel for his EP titled Cover Boy. Fishel's version of the song, produced by Fishel and Mark Crew, is more guitar-led than Carlisle's original and features elements of pop rock and alternative rock. The song begins and ends with thunder sound effects. For his version, Fishel keeps all the same lyrics and male pronouns from the original. It appears as the opening track on Fishel's Cover Boy EP, released on July 14, 2014, on Young Lust Records.
