= Sandy Stewart (musician) =

American singer-songwriter (born 1958)

Sandy Stewart (born January 13, 1958, in San Francisco) is a songwriter, singer and keyboardist from Houston, Texas, USA. She is mostly known for her album Cat Dancer, and her association with Fleetwood Mac vocalist and solo act Stevie Nicks. Stewart's first single, "Saddest Victory" was released in 1984. Its video played on MTV for several weeks, but the song was never a big hit. The single peaked at No. 105 in the Bubbling Under Hot 100. Stewart and Nicks also sang a duet for the song "I Pretend", which featured on Cat Dancer. A 12" single was released to promote Cat Dancer. The single featured a large close-up photo of Stewart on its album cover.

Stewart sang background vocals, played keyboards, synthesizer and piano for Nicks' second solo album The Wild Heart, released in 1983. She also co-wrote several songs for the album, including "If Anyone Falls", "Nothing Ever Changes" and "Nightbird". Stewart's voice can be heard on the song "Nightbird", the third single from the album. Stewart was credited on The Wild Heart and posed with backing vocalists Sharon Celani and Lori Perry for the album's photos. Stewart co-wrote "Maybe Love Will Change Your Mind" for Nicks' 1994 album Street Angel as well as "Too Far from Texas" for Nicks' 2001 album Trouble in Shangri-La.

In 1985, Stewart recorded a duet, "This Is Your Day", with Nile Rodgers for the soundtrack of the film White Nights, starring Mikhail Baryshnikov and Gregory Hines.

Stewart also did a TV commercial for the Japanese soft drink Mets in 1985.

In 1987, the Blue Yonder album was released. Produced by Arif Mardin and John Brand, it was originally intended to be Stewart's second solo album but instead ended up as a 'band' project co-credited to her and David Munday. The song 'House of Love' was recorded by singer-songwriter Maria Vidal on her 1987 debut solo album. Also that year, Stewart co-wrote "Seven Wonders" with Nicks, the song being released on Fleetwood Mac's 1987 album Tango in the Night, and also as a single. It peaked at #19 on the U.S. Billboard Hot 100 Singles Charts and #2 on the U.S. Billboard Hot Mainstream Rock Tracks Chart. In January 2014, Nicks performed the song in the opening of the season finale of the hit show, American Horror Story: Coven. This helped the song to reach #18 on the Billboard 'Digital Rock Songs' chart with sales of 13,000 in 2014.

Along with David Munday, Stewart co-wrote the track "Falling Like Rain" which appears on Tina Turner's 1989 Foreign Affair and "Valentine" which appears on Belinda Carlisle's 1989 Runaway Horses album. Carlisle performed the song on her solo tours in later years.

Stewart frequently cowrote with David Munday or Rick Nowels in the 80s and 90s for acts including Fiona, Then Jerico, Gregg Alexander, Kim Wilde, Faith Hill and Victoria Shaw.

Stewart is also involved in the Purple Songs Can Fly Project, a charitable organization described as "a unique project that provides a musical outlet for the many children being treated for cancer and blood disorders at Texas Children's Cancer Center and their siblings."

In the mid to late 2000s Stewart worked with local Texan acts in clubs and in the studio.

On November 10, 2009, Stewart's Cat Dancer album was released on CD.

== Discography ==
=== Studio albums ===
- Cat Dancer (1984)
- Blue Yonder (1987) (as Blue Yonder)

=== Singles ===
- "Nightbird" (1983) (Stevie Nicks with Sandy Stewart)
- "Saddest Victory" (1984)
- "Windsong" (1987) (Blue Yonder)
- "House of Love" (1987) (Blue Yonder)
