= Closer (Slinkee Minx song) =

Single by Slinkee Minx
- B-side: "Careless Whisper"
- Released: December 2004
- Genre: Dance
- Label: Central Station
- Songwriter(s): M. Palmer, A. Failla, B. Tartaglia

Slinkee Minx singles chronology
"Summer Rain" (2004)	"Closer" (2004)	"Someday" (2005)

"Closer" is a 2004 song written by M. Palmer, A. Failla, B. Tartaglia and performed by Slinkee Minx. It was released in December 2004 and peaked at number 39 on the ARIA Charts.

== Track listing ==
1. "Closer" (Video Mix) – 3:51
2. "Careless Whisper" (Radio Edit) – 4:08
3. "Careless Whisper" (Zander Edit) – 4:05
4. "Closer" (KCB NRG Mix) – 7:18
5. "Closer" (Mike Felks Club Mix) – 6:33
6. "Summer Rain" (Alex K Klubbed Up Mix) – 6:06

== Charts ==
Chart performance for "Closer"
Chart (2004–2005)	Peak position
Australia (ARIA)	39
