= Once Bitten (1985 film) =

1985 film by Howard Storm

- Theatrical release poster
- Directed by: Howard Storm
- Screenplay by: David Hines; Jeffrey Hause; Jonathan Roberts
- Story by: Dimitri Villard
- Produced by: Dimitri Villard; Robby Wald; Frank E. Hildebrand
- Starring: Lauren Hutton; Jim Carrey; Karen Kopins; Cleavon Little
- Cinematography: Adam Greenberg
- Edited by: Marc Grossman
- Music by: John Du Prez
- Distributed by: The Samuel Goldwyn Company
- Release date: November 15, 1985
- Running time: 94 minutes
- Country: United States
- Language: English
- Budget: $3.2 million
- Box office: $10 million (United States and Canada)

Once Bitten is a 1985 American teen comedy horror film directed by Howard Storm and starring Lauren Hutton, Jim Carrey, Karen Kopins, and Cleavon Little. Carrey has his first major lead role playing Mark Kendall, an innocent and naive high school student who is seduced in a Hollywood nightclub by a sultry blonde countess (Hutton), who unknown to him is a centuries-old vampire.

== Plot ==
The Countess, a 400-year-old vampire, has created an army of young male and female vampires who accompany her on her centuries-old journey through eternal life and youth. Though she is immortal, she is required to drink the blood of a male virgin three times by Halloween each year to retain her immortality and her youthful appearance. She finds this task increasingly difficult, since male virgins are nearly impossible to find in the 1980s, particularly in hedonistic cities. With just over a week until Halloween, the Countess sends her vampire minions into Los Angeles to find her a virgin.

Meanwhile, virgin high school student Mark Kendall tries to convince his girlfriend, Robin Pierce, to have sex with him, but she wants her first time to be special. One night, Mark ventures to a singles bar in Hollywood with his best friends Russ and Jamie to try his luck with local women. Once her minions sense Mark's virginity, the Countess lures him to the bar and takes him to her mansion, where she seduces him and bites his thigh, rendering him unconscious. When Mark wakes up with no memory of their encounter, the Countess convinces him that they have had sex. Although he confesses that he has a girlfriend, she asks to see him again before he leaves.

At school, Robin overhears Mark telling Russ and Jamie about how he presumably lost his virginity to another woman, and breaks up with him. Over the next few days, Mark begins exhibiting strange behavior, such as avoiding direct sunlight and drinking blood from raw meat, and dreams that the Countess sucks his blood. Mark eventually reconciles with Robin, and while visiting her at the clothing store where she works, he is surprised by the Countess in the fitting room. After Mark rejects the Countess's advances, she bites him a second time and leaves.

As Mark and Robin dance at the school's Halloween dance, the Countess arrives and interrupts them. The women then have a dance-off, and the Countess leaves defeated. Afterward, Mark tells Robin that he believes the Countess is turning him into a vampire, before they both notice that he has no reflection in the mirror. While seeking information about vampires from a bookseller, Robin learns that, to drain the blood of a male virgin, female vampires bite their victims in the inner thigh.

One evening, the Countess kidnaps Robin to lure Mark to her mansion for the final bite. With Russ and Jamie in tow, Mark finds and frees Robin in the Countess's basement, and Robin informs Mark that the Countess did not have sex with him and only drained his blood. The four teenagers are soon captured, and Mark is strapped to a chair as the Countess prepares to bite him a third time. After Robin, Russ, and Jamie manage to free Mark, Robin flees with him through the mansion while being chased by the Countess's minions. Meanwhile, Russ and Jamie are seduced by two of the Countess's female minions.

Shortly after Mark and Robin discover a room filled with caskets, the Countess arrives to find the couple having sex inside a large casket, rendering Mark's blood useless to her. As the clock strikes midnight, the Countess rapidly ages before their eyes, turning into an elderly woman. Her manservant, Sebastian, assures her that there are other virgins in the world, though the Countess doubts she will find another virgin. Mark and Robin continue to have sex inside the casket.

== Cast ==
- Lauren Hutton as the Countess
- Jim Carrey as Mark Kendall
- Karen Kopins as Robin Pierce
- Cleavon Little as Sebastian, the Countess's manservant
- Thomas Ballatore as Jamie
- Skip Lackey as Russ
- Richard Schaal as Mr. Kendall, Mark's father
- Peggy Pope as Mrs. Kendall, Mark's mother
- Megan Mullally as Suzette

=== The Countess's Vampires ===
- Jeb Stuart Adams as World War I Ace Vampire
- Joseph Brutsman as Confederate Vampire
- Stuart Charno as Cabin Boy Vampire
- Robin Klein as Flowerchild Vampire
- Glen Mauro as Twin Vampire #1
- Gary Mauro as Twin Vampire #2
- Carey More as Moll Flanders Vampire

== Production ==
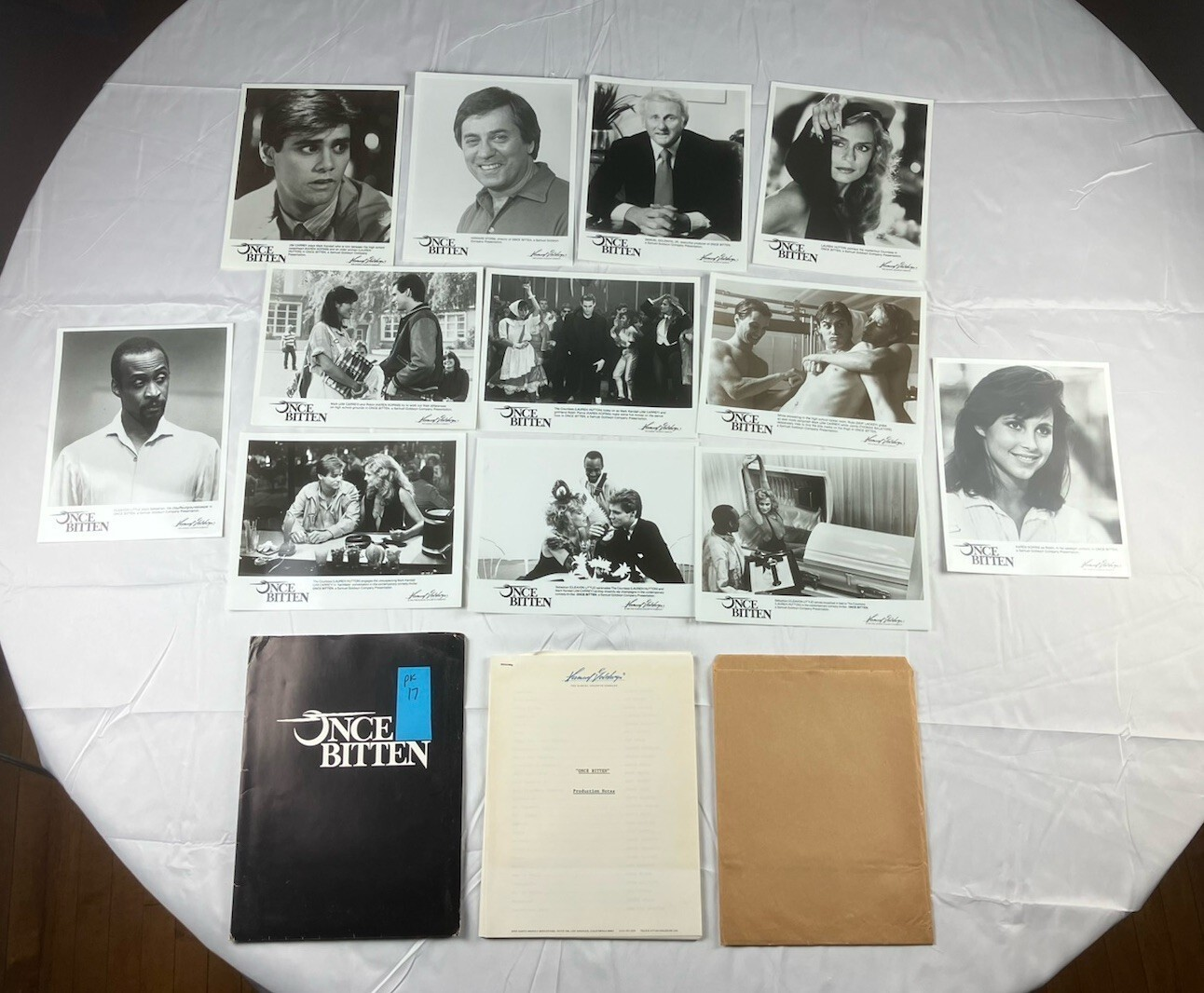
Press kit containing photos and production notes for Once Bitten

Once Bitten is the directorial debut of Howard Storm. The film was shot over the course of 45 days in and around Los Angeles.

== Release ==
The film was released on November 15, 1985, on 1,095 screens, and opened at number one at the U.S. box office, grossing $4,025,657 for the weekend. It eventually earned around $10 million in the United States and Canada.

=== Critical reception ===
On review aggregator Rotten Tomatoes, the film holds an approval rating of 11% based on nine reviews, with an average score of 3.3/10. On Metacritic, the film received a score of 64 out of 100 based on four reviews, indicating "generally favorable reviews".

Janet Maslin of The New York Times wrote that it "has a lot more stylishness than wit." Kevin Thomas of the Los Angeles Times called it an "extreme rarity" for its subtle and hilarious sexual humor in a teen film. Rita Kempley of The Washington Post described it as "a sappy, sophomoric sex farce" that uses dated humor.

=== Home media ===
The film was first released on VHS in 1986 and on DVD on August 26, 2003. Scream Factory released the film on Blu-Ray on February 10, 2015.

== See also ==
- Once Bitten (soundtrack)
- Vampire film
- List of films set around Halloween
