= Gordon Perry (producer) =

American record producer, manager, concert promoter, director and publisher

Gordon Perry (born June 4, 1947) is an American who has served in the music industry as a record producer, manager, concert promoter, video director, publisher, label executive and recording studio owner since 1968.

In the late 1960s he had his first success as a producer with the Southwest FOB's (England Dan & John Ford Coley) hit "Smell of Incense". In the early 1970s, as a concert promoter, he helped launch ZZ Top and worked extensively with Kris Kristofferson and Rita Coolidge.

In addition to being a record producer, he owned and operated recording studios in Dallas and Los Angeles (Goodnight Dallas & Goodnight LA). His production work included Stevie Nicks (Fleetwood Mac), Face to Face (new wave band), Sandy Stewart, Joey Belladonna (Anthrax), Glenn Hughes (Deep Purple / Black Sabbath) and Marc Benno (The Asylum Choir) among others. During Stevie Nicks' solo career, he worked with her as producer, arranger, publisher and video director.

From 1988 to 1991, Perry was President of Kore Group Records, a member of the WEA group of labels, under the Atlantic Records Division.

His publishing company's involvement on the Beverly Hills Cop soundtrack earned him a Grammy Award and Gordon has also been awarded six gold and platinum records for his involvement in sales of over ten million records.

He has been on the leading edge of surround sound mixing and sound design with his work on The Gate To The Minds Eye DVD by Thomas Dolby.

His partner of over 30 years is the legendary record producer Keith Olsen (Fleetwood Mac, Pat Benatar, Rick Springfield, Heart (band), The Grateful Dead, Santana (band), Scorpions (band), Whitesnake, REO Speedwagon, Kim Carnes, etc.).

"In 2015 Gordon is working in collaboration with Wally Wilson & Paul Worley at Skyville Live"

== Discography ==
Producer Highlights
"The Wild Heart"	Stevie Nicks	Modern/Atlantic	1983
"Cat Dancer"	Sandy Stewart	Modern/Atlantic	1984
"Face To Face"	Face To Face	Epic	1984
"American Anthem Soundtrack" (Battle of The Dragon/Stevie Nicks)	Stevie Nicks	Atlantic	1986
"The Sound of Deep Ellum" (Paint the Flowers /Shallow Reign)	Shallow Reign	Island	1987
"Tales From The Edge"	Twist of Fate	The Edge	1991
"Surround Music Sampler Volume I"	Various	Kore Group	1994
"Belladonna"	Joey Belladonna	Mausoleum	1995
"Surround Music Sampler Volume II"	Various	Kore Group	1996
"Incense & Peaches"	Glenn Hughes	Pink Cloud	1999
"Surround Music Sampler Volume II"
"Trixie"	Trixie	Metal Mayhem Music	2003
"From The Vault"	Marc Benno	Vivid	2010
Additional Highlights
Arranger "Bella Donna"	Stevie Nicks	Modern/Atlantic	1981
Video director "If Anyone Falls"	Stevie Nicks	Modern/Atlantic	1983
"Rock-n-Roll Me Again"	The System	MCA	1985
Sound design / Surround mixer "The Gate To The Minds Eye"	Thomas Dolby	Miramar	1995
