= Stand Back (Stevie Nicks album) =

Compilation album by Stevie Nicks
- Released: March 29, 2019
- Genre: Rock
- Length: 78:04
- Label: Rhino
- Producer: Jason Day; Bill Inglot

Stevie Nicks chronology
24 Karat Gold: Songs from the Vault (2014)	Stand Back (2019)	Complete Studio Albums and Rarities (2023)

Stand Back is a compilation album by American musician Stevie Nicks. The single-disc edition was released on March 29, 2019, while an expanded 3-CD version, titled Stand Back 1981–2017, was released on April 19, 2019. A 6-LP vinyl release was produced as well, released on June 28, 2019. The album was released through Rhino Entertainment, and was intended to coincide with Nicks's induction into the Rock and Roll Hall of Fame.

== Certifications ==
Certifications for Stand Back
Region	Certification	Certified units/sales
United Kingdom (BPI)	Silver	60,000^{‡}
^{^} Shipments figures based on certification alone.

== Track listing ==
=== Stand Back ===
No.	Title	Writer(s)	Original release	Length
1.	"Edge of Seventeen" (single version)	Stevie Nicks	Bella Donna, 1981	4:33
2.	"Stop Draggin' My Heart Around" (with Tom Petty and the Heartbreakers)	Tom Petty; Mike Campbell	Bella Donna	4:04
3.	"Leather and Lace" (with Don Henley) (single version)	Nicks	Bella Donna	3:31
4.	"Rooms on Fire" (7" remix version)	Nicks; Rick Nowels	The Other Side of the Mirror, 1989	4:30
5.	"Stand Back" (single version)	Nicks	The Wild Heart, 1983	4:22
6.	"If Anyone Falls"	Nicks; Sandy Stewart	The Wild Heart	4:09
7.	"Talk to Me"	Chas Sandford	Rock a Little, 1985	4:10
8.	"I Can't Wait" (single version - soft intro)	Nicks; Nowels; Eric Pressly	Rock a Little	4:06
9.	"Has Anyone Ever Written Anything for You?"	Nicks; Keith Olsen	Rock a Little	4:34
10.	"Long Way to Go"	Nicks; Nowels; Charles Judge	The Other Side of the Mirror	4:01
11.	"Maybe Love Will Change Your Mind" (radio remix)	S. Stewart; Nowels	Street Angel, 1994	4:19
12.	"Blue Denim"	Nicks; Campbell	Street Angel	4:22
13.	"Every Day"	John Shanks; Damon Johnson	Trouble in Shangri-La, 2001	3:33
14.	"Secret Love"	Nicks	In Your Dreams, 2011	3:15
15.	"The Dealer"	Nicks	24 Karat Gold: Songs from the Vault, 2014	4:38
16.	"Lady"	Nicks	24 Karat Gold: Songs from the Vault	4:58
17.	"Dreams" (live)	Nicks	previously unreleased	4:58
18.	"Gold Dust Woman" (live)	Nicks	previously unreleased	6:01
