= Enchanted (Stevie Nicks album) =

The Enchanted Works of Stevie Nicks

Box set by Stevie Nicks
- Released: April 28, 1998
- Recorded: 1973–1998
- Genre: Rock
- Length: 3:31:43
- Label: Modern/Atlantic (US/Canada); EMI Records (rest of world)
- Producer: Jimmy Iovine, Gordon Perry, Thom Panunzio, Stevie Nicks, Rupert Hine, Rick Nowels, Chas Sandford, Michael Campbell, Chris Lord-Alge, Keith Olsen, John Stewart, Lindsey Buckingham, Bob James, Andrew Slater, Don Was

Stevie Nicks chronology
Street Angel (1994)	The Enchanted Works of Stevie Nicks (1998)	Trouble in Shangri-La (2001)

Singles from Enchanted
- 1. "Reconsider Me" Released: April 21, 1998; 2. "Enchanted" Released: 1998

Enchanted (or The Enchanted Works of Stevie Nicks) is a three-disc box set of material by American singer-songwriter and Fleetwood Mac vocalist Stevie Nicks, which encompasses her solo career from Bella Donna (1981) to Street Angel (1994) and beyond.

The box set contains rare B-sides, unreleased live recordings, demos, songs from soundtracks, a track from the album Buckingham Nicks (1973), outtakes from the Bella Donna and Rock a Little sessions, and a new piano recording of the Nicks-penned Fleetwood Mac song "Rhiannon". Some previously released tracks are also in noticeably longer versions, or alternative remixes.

The set was released on April 28, 1998, and peaked at No. 85 on the Billboard 200 Albums chart. Enchanted was certified Gold by the RIAA on April 7, 1999, for shipments of over 166,000 copies. Two singles were released, "Reconsider Me" (a deleted track from the album Rock a Little (1985)) and "Enchanted" which made its first appearance on the album The Wild Heart (1983).

It was mastered using HDCD technology and, although it is unmarked, playing the album in a CD player able to decode HDCD will give superior sound quality.

== Track listing ==
=== Disc one ===
No.	Title	Writer(s)	Length
1.	"Enchanted"	Nicks	3:06
2.	"Outside the Rain"	Nicks	4:18
3.	"After the Glitter Fades"	Nicks	3:30
4.	"Wild Heart"	Nicks	6:10
5.	"Leather and Lace" (Duet with Don Henley)	Nicks	3:57
6.	"Garbo" (B-side to Stand Back single)	Nicks	3:31
7.	"Stand Back"	Nicks	4:51
8.	"Nightbird"	Nicks, Sandy Stewart	5:00
9.	"Stop Draggin' My Heart Around" (Duet with Tom Petty)	Tom Petty, Mike Campbell	4:05
10.	"Beauty and the Beast"	Nicks	6:05
11.	"Kind of Woman"	Nicks, Benmont Tench	3:11
12.	"If Anyone Falls"	Nicks, Stewart	4:09
13.	"One More Big Time Rock and Roll Star" (B-Side to Talk to Me single)	Nicks	4:25
14.	"Blue Denim" (Remix)	Nicks, Campbell	4:13
15.	"Bella Donna"	Nicks	5:20
Total length:			65:43

=== Disc two ===
No.	Title	Writer(s)	Length
1.	"Edge of Seventeen" (Live from the Bella Donna Tour)	Nicks	8:07
2.	"Street Angel" (Remix)	Nicks	4:07
3.	"Rock a Little (Go Ahead Lily)"	Nicks	3:38
4.	"I Sing for the Things"	Nicks	3:46
5.	"Rooms on Fire"	Nicks, Rick Nowels	3:34
6.	"I Can't Wait" (Extended Rock Mix)	Nicks, Nowels, Eric Pressly	5:58
7.	"Two Kinds of Love" (Duet with Bruce Hornsby)	Nicks, Nowels, Rupert Hine	4:48
8.	"The Highwayman"	Nicks	4:52
9.	"Rose Garden" (Remix)	Nicks	4:25
10.	"Talk to Me"	Chas Sandford	4:12
11.	"Destiny" (Remix)	Nicks	4:37
12.	"Ooh My Love"	Nicks, Nowels	5:04
13.	"Desert Angel"	Nicks, Campbell	5:23
14.	"Whole Lotta Trouble" (Tom Lord-Alge Remix)	Nicks, Campbell	4:29
15.	"Has Anyone Ever Written Anything for You?"	Nicks, Keith Olsen	4:32
Total length:			72:23

=== Disc three ===
No.	Title	Writer(s)	Length
1.	"Twisted" (Demo; Original version from the Twister soundtrack)	Nicks	3:20
2.	"Long Distance Winner" (From Buckingham Nicks)	Nicks	4:49
3.	"Thousand Days" (B-side to Blue Denim single)	Nicks	5:18
4.	"Battle of the Dragon" (From the American Anthem soundtrack)	Nicks, Gary Nicholson, John Jarvis	5:19
5.	"Gold" (Duet with John Stewart)	John Stewart	4:22
6.	"Free Fallin'" (From Music From Party of Five)	Tom Petty, Jeff Lynne	5:35
7.	"It's Late" (Demo)	Dorsey Burnette	2:11
8.	"Violet and Blue" (From the Against All Odds soundtrack)	Nicks	5:05
9.	"Whenever I Call You "Friend"" (Duet with Kenny Loggins)	Loggins, Melissa Manchester	3:53
10.	"Sweet Girl" (Demo)	Nicks	4:32
11.	"Blue Lamp" (From the Heavy Metal soundtrack)	Nicks	3:46
12.	"Gold and Braid" (Live from the Bella Donna Tour)	Nicks	5:16
13.	"Reconsider Me" (Previously unreleased)	Warren Zevon, Nicks	3:47
14.	"Somebody Stand by Me" (From the Boys on the Side soundtrack)	Sheryl Crow, Todd Wolfe	5:06
15.	"Sleeping Angel" (From the Fast Times at Ridgemont High soundtrack)	Nicks	4:45
16.	"Rhiannon" (Piano Version)	Nicks	6:41
Total length:			73:39

== Personnel ==
- Stevie Nicks – lead vocals, keyboards, guitars, harmonica, piano, percussion
- Lindsey Buckingham – guitar, percussion, vocals
- Mick Fleetwood – drums, percussion
- Tom Petty – guitar, vocals
- Mike Campbell – guitars, keyboards, bass
- Sandy Stewart – piano, vocals, synthesizer
- Kenny Loggins – vocals
- Bruce Hornsby – vocals
- Don Henley – vocals, drums
- Joe Walsh – guitar
- Jesse Valenzuela – guitar, mandolin
- Waddy Wachtel – guitar
- Dean Parks – guitar
- Steve Lukather – guitar
- Danny Kortchmar – guitar
- Mike Landau – guitar
- Kenny G – saxophone
- Dave Koz – saxophone
- Benmont Tench – piano, synthesizer, organ
- David Foster – piano
- Bob Glaub – bass
- Donald "Duck" Dunn – bass
- Tony Levin – bass
- Gary "Hoppy" Hodges – drums, percussion
- Russ Kunkel – drums
- Stan Lynch – drums
- Sharon Celani – backing vocals
- Lori Perry-Nicks – backing vocals
- Carolyn Brooks – backing vocals
- Marilyn Martin – backing vocals
- David Crosby – backing vocals
- Roy Bittan – piano
- Steve Hall – box set mastering at Future Disc

== Charts and certifications ==
Chart (1998)	Peak position
The Billboard 200	85

=== Certifications ===
Region	Certification	Certified units/sales
United States (RIAA)	Gold	166,667^{^}
^{^} Shipments figures based on certification alone.
