= Complete Studio Albums & Rarities =

Box set by Stevie Nicks
- Released: July 24, 2023
- Genre: Rock
- Length: 9:06:06
- Label: Rhino
- Producer: Various

Stevie Nicks chronology
Stand Back (2019)	Complete Studio Albums & Rarities (2023)

Complete Studio Albums & Rarities is a box set by the American singer-songwriter Stevie Nicks, released on July 24, 2023, by Rhino Entertainment.

== Background and contents ==
Complete Studio Albums & Rarities contains all the studio albums Stevie Nicks recorded as of 2023 on 8 discs, those being Bella Donna (1981), The Wild Heart (1983) Rock a Little (1985), The Other Side of the Mirror (1989), Street Angel (1994), Trouble in Shangri-La (2001), In Your Dreams (2011), and 24 Karat Gold: Songs from the Vault (2014), plus two discs featuring b-sides, soundtrack recordings and other tracks not recorded for her albums. The album is also available in a 16 LP format. This version is exclusive to Rhino Entertainment's website.

== Release and reception ==
Professional ratings
Review scores
Source	Rating
AllMusic	4/5 stars
American Songwriter	4.5/5 stars
Rolling Stone France	4/5 stars
Under the Radar	9/10 stars

Complete Studio Albums & Rarities was released on July 24, 2023, by Rhino Entertainment and was generally well received, with critics such as Stephen Thomas Erlewine stating that "While nothing here is especially compelling, the two discs function as a fascinating time capsule of the shifting fortunes of mainstream rock during the '80s and '90s."

American Songwriter critic Alex Hopper stated that "The content is pretty much what one would expect. There aren't many surprises within the first part of this release. But, if anything, take it as an excuse to revisit Nicks' work", noting that "Many of the songs on Rarities are only available on this release. If you are a Nicks fan, you're likely starving for new content from the rock icon", he concludes by saying that "It's high time we brought Nicks back into focus and really meditated on what made her the symbol she is today. This release provides just the outlet."

== Rarities track listing ==
No.	Title	Length
1.	"Blue Lamp"
2.	"Sleeping Angel"
3.	"Garbo"
4.	"Violet and Blue"
5.	"One More Big Time Rock and Roll Star"
6.	"Battle of the Dragon"
7.	"Real Tears"
8.	"Sometimes It's a Bitch"
9.	"Love's a Hard Game to Play"
10.	"Desert Angel"
11.	"Mirror, Mirror"
12.	"Inspiration"
13.	"Thousand Days"
14.	"God's Garden"
15.	"Somebody Stand by Me"
16.	"Free Fallin'"
17.	"Reconsider Me"
18.	"If You Ever Did Believe"
19.	"Crystal"
20.	"Touched by an Angel"
21.	"Not Fade Away"
22.	"My Heart"
23.	"For What It's Worth"

== Charts ==
Weekly chart performance for Complete Studio Albums & Rarities
Chart (2023)	Peak position
Scottish Albums (Official Charts)	48
US Top Album Sales (Billboard)	23
US Top Current Album Sales (Billboard)	19
