= Rock a Little Tour =

1986 concert tour by Stevie Nicks

- Tour by Stevie Nicks
- Poster to the concerts in Cuyahoga Falls, Ohio
- Associated album: Rock a Little
- Start date: April 11, 1986
- End date: October 10, 1986
- Legs: 4
- No. of shows: 63

Stevie Nicks concert chronology
- The Wild Heart Tour (1983); Rock a Little Tour (1986); The Other Side of the Mirror Tour (1989)

Stevie Nicks supported the release of her third album Rock a Little with a world tour, which included shows in the United States, Canada and Australia. The tour started on April 11, 1986 in Houston, Texas and ended on October 6, 1986, in Sydney, Australia.

For the tour, Nicks performed four songs from Rock a Little: "Talk to Me", "No Spoken Word", "I Can't Wait" and "Has Anyone Ever Written Anything for You?".

The August 20 Red Rocks Amphitheatre show in Morrison, Colorado was taped and subsequently released on video in 1987. The September 16 Cayuga County Fairgrounds show in Weedsport, New York was recorded and later rebroadcast for the Westwood One Radio Networks Superstar Concert Series.

The Austrian band Opus and Peter Frampton were the support acts.

== Set list ==
1. "Gold Dust Woman"^{*}
2. "Outside the Rain"
3. "Dreams"
4. "Talk to Me"
5. "I Need to Know" (Tom Petty and the Heartbreakers cover)
6. "No Spoken Word"
7. "Sara"^{*}
8. "Beauty and the Beast"
9. "I Can't Wait"
10. "Gypsy"^{*}
11. "Leather and Lace"
12. "Stand Back"
13. "Stop Draggin' My Heart Around"
14. "How Still My Love"
15. "Edge of Seventeen"
  Encore
16. "Rhiannon"
17. "Has Anyone Ever Written Anything for You?"
- *Performed at select dates early during the tour
- **Performed in Houston, Texas

== Tour dates ==
List of 1986 concerts:
| Date | City | Country | Venue | Tickets sold / available | Revenue |
|---|---|---|---|---|---|
| April 11 | Houston | United States | The Summit | 13,890 / 17,050 | $210,816 |
| April 12 | Austin | United States | Frank Erwin Center | 12,538 / 17,617 | $178,882 |
| April 15 | Dallas | United States | Reunion Arena | 13,529 / 19,000 | $207,488 |
| April 16 | Oklahoma City | United States | Myriad Convention Center | 9,484 / 15,000 | $136,440 |
| April 19 | Iowa City | United States | Carver-Hawkeye Arena | | |
| April 20 | Lincoln | United States | Bob Devaney Sports Center | | |
| April 22 | Lexington | United States | Rupp Arena | | |
| April 25 | Baton Rouge | United States | Maravich Assembly Center | | |
| April 26 | Biloxi | United States | Mississippi Coast Coliseum | | |
| April 30 | Knoxville | United States | Stokely Athletic Center | | |
| May 2 | Hartford | United States | Hartford Civic Center | 14,941 / 14,941 | $229,102 |
| May 3 | Providence | United States | Providence Civic Center | 12,296 / 12,296 | $187,550 |
| May 6 | Philadelphia | United States | The Spectrum | 17,220 / 17,220 | $275,054 |
| May 7 | Baltimore | United States | Baltimore Civic Center | 12,029 / 13,845 | $181,536 |
| May 11 | Tampa | United States | USF Sun Dome | 8,947 / 10,608 | $143,152 |
| May 30 | Indianapolis | United States | Sports and Music Center | 7,531 / 8,708 | $123,573 |
| May 31 | East Troy | United States | Alpine Valley Music Theatre | | |
| June 3 | Worcester | United States | The Centrum | 24,112 / 24,800 | $357,237 |
| June 4 | Worcester | United States | The Centrum | 24,112 / 24,800 | $357,237 |
| June 8 | Wantagh | United States | Jones Beach Marine Theater | | |
| June 9 | Wantagh | United States | Jones Beach Marine Theater | | |
| June 11 | Pittsburgh | United States | Civic Arena | 12,475 / 13,257 | $185,008 |
| June 13 | Cuyahoga Falls | United States | Blossom Music Center | | |
| June 17 | Holmdel | United States | Garden State Arts Center | | |
| June 18 | Holmdel | United States | Garden State Arts Center | | |
| June 21 | Hoffman Estates | United States | Poplar Creek Music Theater | | |
| June 22 | Clarkston | United States | Pine Knob Music Theatre | | |
| June 28 | Phoenix | United States | Compton Terrace Amphitheatre | | |
| June 29 | Costa Mesa | United States | Pacific Amphitheatre | 15,473 / 18,764 | $240,593 |
| July 13 | San Diego | United States | San Diego Sports Arena | | |
| July 14 | Mountain View | United States | Shoreline Amphitheatre | 11,146 / 18,000 | $186,360 |
| July 17 | Sacramento | United States | Cal Expo Amphitheatre | 6,572 / 8,000 | $108,438 |
| July 18 | Inglewood | United States | The Forum | | |
| July 21 | Bonner Springs | United States | Sandstone Amphitheater | | |
| July 23 | Philadelphia | United States | The Spectrum | 12,574 / 17,220 | $205,639 |
| July 27 | Portland | United States | Cumberland County Civic Center | 7,418 / 8,758 | $122,397 |
| July 29 | New Haven | United States | New Haven Coliseum | | |
| July 30 | Mansfield | United States | Great Woods Performing Arts Center | 11,457 / 15,260 | $180,143 |
| August 2 | Landover | United States | Capital Centre | 10,670 / 15,000 | $170,720 |
| August 5 | New York City | United States | Madison Square Garden | | |
| August 7 | Atlanta | United States | Six Flags Park | | |
| August 8 | Daytona Beach | United States | Ocean Center | 8,837 / 8,837 | $141,392 |
| August 11 | Canandaigua | United States | Finger Lakes Performing Arts Center | | |
| August 12 | Saratoga Springs | United States | Saratoga Springs Performing Arts Center | | |
| August 14 | Toronto | Canada | CNE Grandstand | | |
| August 17 | Middletown | United States | Orange County Fairgrounds | | |
| August 20 | Morrison | United States | Red Rocks Amphitheatre | 7,007 / 9,000 | $132,009 |
| August 28 | Long Beach | United States | Long Beach Arena | | |
| September 16 | Weedsport | United States | Cayuga County Fair Speedway | | |
| September 24 | Sydney | Australia | Sydney Entertainment Centre | | |
| September 25 | Sydney | Australia | Sydney Entertainment Centre | | |
| September 27 | Brisbane | Australia | Brisbane Festival Hall | | |
| September 29 | Melbourne | Australia | Melbourne Festival Hall | | |
| September 30 | Melbourne | Australia | Melbourne Festival Hall | | |
| October 1 | Melbourne | Australia | Melbourne Festival Hall | | |
| October 4 | Melbourne | Australia | Melbourne Festival Hall | | |
| October 6 | Sydney | Australia | Sydney Entertainment Centre | | |

== Personnel ==
- Stevie Nicks – lead vocals
- Jennifer Condos – bass
- Bobbye Hall – percussion
- Rick Marotta – drums
- Bobby Martin – keyboards, horns, vocals
- Jai Winding – keyboards
- Waddy Wachtel – guitar
- Sharon Celani – backing vocals
- Lori Perry – backing vocals
- Elisecia Wright – backing vocals
