= Live at Red Rocks (video) =

Video by Stevie Nicks
- Released: 1987
- Recorded: August 20, 1986
- Genre: Rock,
- Length: 60:00
- Label: Reprise

Stevie Nicks chronology
Rock a Little (1985)	Live at Red Rocks (1987)	The Other Side of the Mirror (1989)

Live at Red Rocks is a concert performance video by the American singer-songwriter and Fleetwood Mac vocalist Stevie Nicks, performing at Red Rocks Amphitheater in Colorado. It was filmed during Nicks' 1986 Rock a Little Tour. It features special guests Peter Frampton on guitar and Mick Fleetwood on percussion. It was nominated for the Grammy Award for Best Performance Music Video in 1987. Originally released on VHS and Laserdisc in 1987, it was also issued on the VCD format, and later reissued on DVD in 2007.

== Track listing ==
1. "Outside the Rain"
2. "Dreams"
3. "Talk to Me"
4. "I Need to Know" (Tom Petty and the Heartbreakers cover)
5. "No Spoken Word"
6. "Beauty and the Beast"
7. "Stand Back"
8. "Has Anyone Ever Written Anything for You?"
9. "Edge of Seventeen"

== Personnel ==
Main performers

- Stevie Nicks – vocals, tambourine
- Waddy Wachtel – guitar
- Peter Frampton – guitar
- Mick Fleetwood – percussion
- Jennifer Condos – bass
- Bobby Martin – horn, keyboards, background vocals
- Jai Winding – keyboards
- Bobbye Hall – percussion
- Rick Marotta – drums
- Sharon Celani – background vocals
- Lori Perry-Nicks – background vocals
- Elesecia Wright – background vocals

== Certifications ==
Region	Certification	Certified units/sales
Australia (ARIA)	Gold	7,500^{^}
^{^} Shipments figures based on certification alone.
