= Maybe Love Will Change Your Mind =

- UK 7-inch and CD1 cover

Single by Stevie Nicks

from the album Street Angel
- B-side: "Inspiration"
- Released: May 23, 1994
- Recorded: 1992–1994
- Genre: Pop rock; soft rock
- Length: 4:18
- Label: Modern; Atlantic
- Songwriters: Rick Nowels; Sandy Stewart
- Producers: Stevie Nicks; Thom Panunzio

Stevie Nicks singles chronology
"Love's a Hard Game to Play" (1991)	"Maybe Love Will Change Your Mind" (1994)	"Blue Denim" (1994)

"Maybe Love Will Change Your Mind" is a song by the American singer/songwriter Stevie Nicks. It served as the lead single to Nicks' fifth studio album Street Angel (1994), and was released on May 23, 1994 via Modern Records. "Blue Denim" had originally been slated as the lead single before it was changed to this song. In Europe, the song was serviced to radio stations after "Blue Denim" and released under the truncated titled of "Maybe Love".

"Maybe Love Will Change Your Mind" peaked at No. 57 on the Billboard Hot 100 and also reached the top ten in Canada. In the UK, the single was released on 4 July 1994 and later peaked at No. 42. Although it was included on her "Street Angel" tour set list, it was not included on any of Nicks' compilations until Stand Back (2019) and was scarcely mentioned again by the artist.

== Critical reception ==
Larry Flick of Billboard characterized the "Maybe Love Will Change Your Mind" as a "breezy, finger poppin' pop gem" and anticipated that the song would be "light enough to make the grade at top 40 and AC formats." Kara Manning of Rolling Stone called it "one of Nicks' best songs in years." Knight Ridder newspaper called the song a "charmer, thanks to Nicks' relaxed vocals and its seizing and chipper pop-rock nature."

== Track listing ==
US CD Single

1. "Maybe Love Will Change Your Mind"
2. "Inspiration"

UK CD Single

1. "Maybe Love" (remix)
2. "Has Anyone Ever Written Anything for You?"
3. "I Can't Wait"
4. "Maybe Love" (album version)

== Personnel ==
- Stevie Nicks – lead vocals
- Sharon Celani – vocal harmonies
- Sara Fleetwood – vocal harmonies
- Tim Pierce – electric guitars
- Waddy Wachtel – additional guitars
- John Pierce – bass guitar
- Benmont Tench – Hammond organ, synthesizer
- Kenny Aronoff – drums
- Peter Michael – percussion

== Charts ==
=== Weekly charts ===
Chart (1994)	Peak position
Canada Top Singles (RPM)	8
Canada Adult Contemporary (RPM)	10
UK Singles (Official Charts)	42
US Billboard Hot 100	57
US Adult Contemporary (Billboard)	17
US Mainstream Rock (Billboard)	36
US Cash Box Top 100	83
US A/C (Gavin Report)	5
US Top 40 (Gavin Report)	25
US Adult Contemporary (Radio & Records)	22
US Hot AC/Adult CHR (Radio & Records)	14
US Rock Tracks (Radio & Records)	29

=== Year-end charts ===
Chart (1994)	Position
Canada Top Singles (RPM)	68
Canadian Adult Contemporary (RPM)	80
