= Richard S. Kaufman =

American television producer

Richard S. Kaufman is an American producer, director and film editor.

== Biography ==
Kaufman was born and raised in Philadelphia, Pennsylvania. He graduated from Haverford High School and earned a bachelor's degree from Temple University, where his studies focused on Television, Radio and Film. During his senior year of college, Kaufman worked at the local ABC affiliate as a student on-camera host for a show called Youth Perspective.

After working as a grip, gaffer and cameraman, Kaufman was hired as a Technical Director by WTAF 29. He became host of a Comcast game show called At the End of Your Rope, then moved to New York and worked on the series "Night Flight."

Kaufman moved to Los Angeles and worked for director Marty Callner, who taught him techniques for cutting music videos and concerts. Kaufman edited the Stevie Nicks concert Live at Red Rocks (1986), the Whitesnake video Still of the Night (1987) and the sitcom 227 (1987).

In the late 1980s, Kaufman joined New Wave Entertainment where he edited and produced trailers for Cocktail (1988), Pretty Woman (1990), and Sister Act (1992). He became a partner of New Wave but sold his interest to start his own company, Goodspot.

In 2008, Kaufman was Supervising Producer on the 11th Annual Ribbon of Hope Celebration, which was nominated for a Daytime Emmy Award. He also directed Live from the Red Carpet: The 2014 Daytime Emmy Awards and produced concert videos for the Aspen Music Festival.

Kaufman was Executive Producer on the ITV and OWN networks' show Real Life: The Musical (2012).

== Political projects ==
In 2004, Kaufman worked on the trailer for The Hunting of the President, a documentary about President Bill Clinton. He produced the tribute film which introduced Hillary Clinton at the 2008 Democratic National Convention. Since 2009, Kaufman has created four films on Worldwide Food Security for then-Secretary of State Clinton, all narrated by actor Matt Damon.

In November 2012, Kaufman produced a short film for Haim Saban, a Clinton donor and founder of the Saban Center for Middle East Policy at the Brookings Institution. The film screened at the center's annual dinner, where Hillary Clinton was the keynote speaker. The film, which praised Clinton's achievements, featured interviews with Israeli prime minister Benjamin Netanyahu, former British prime minister Tony Blair, former secretary of state Henry Kissinger and President Barack Obama. Kaufman has also directed fundraising films on behalf of Haim Saban and the Jewish charity the FIDF.

Kaufman completed two congressional TV campaigns for Democratic National Committee Chair Debbie Wasserman Schultz, and a short film for The Shriver Report.

== Documentaries ==
In 2013 Kaufman produced and directed the documentary short Oscar de la Renta: An American Icon. Produced in conjunction with the Clinton Foundation, the project featured personal interviews with Anna Wintour, Barbara Walters, Diane Von Furstenberg and the Clinton family. It premiered at the Clinton Presidential Center and was screened at the 2012 Carnegie Hall Medal of Excellence Gala. In 2014, a new version of the film featured Laura Bush, another first lady for whom de la Renta designed dresses, and was screened at the George W. Bush Presidential Library. Kaufman also produced projects for Cole Haan, Nike and BCBG.

In 2016, Kaufman co-directed short films for National Endowment for the Arts: United States of Arts, a series which Robert Redford created for the Sundance Film Festival. The series was nominated for Emmy awards in 2016 and 2017, and Producers Guild of America awards in 2017 and 2018.

== Personnel ==
Kaufman and his wife raise American Quarter Horses. Their stallion, DON'TMESSWITHMYCHIC achieved second place in the 2005 World Reigning competition.
