= Imperial Hotel (song) =

Single by Stevie Nicks

from the album Rock a Little
- B-side: "I Can't Wait"
- Released: September 1986
- Recorded: 1984−1985
- Genre: Rock
- Length: 2:56
- Label: Parlophone (Australia)
- Songwriters: Stevie Nicks; Mike Campbell
- Producers: Mike Campbell; Jimmy Iovine

Stevie Nicks singles chronology
"Has Anyone Ever Written Anything for You?" (1986)	"Imperial Hotel" (1986)	"Rooms on Fire" (1989)

"Imperial Hotel" is a single released by American singer-songwriter Stevie Nicks from her album Rock a Little. The song was dedicated to keyboardist Benmont Tench. The single was released only in Australia, where it peaked at No. 99 in October 1986. The song was co-written by Tom Petty and the Heartbreakers guitarist Mike Campbell. Heartbreakers Mike Campbell and Benmont Tench are featured on the track.

== Personnel ==
- Stevie Nicks – vocals
- Sharon Celani – backing vocals
- Lori Nicks – backing vocals
- Mike Campbell – guitar
- Marilyn Martin – backing vocals
- Steven Jordan – drums
- Benmont Tench – organ

== Charts ==
Chart (1986)	Peak position
Australia (Kent Music Report)	99
