= Street Angel (album) =

Studio album by Stevie Nicks
- Released: May 23, 1994 (UK); June 7, 1994 (US)
- Recorded: July 1992 – February 1993, June 1993, January – February 1994
- Studios: Ocean Way (Hollywood); A&M (Hollywood); Groove Masters (Santa Monica)
- Genre: Rock
- Length: 57:32
- Labels: Modern/Atlantic (US/Canada); EMI (international)
- Producers: Stevie Nicks; Thom Panunzio; Roy Bittan; Glen Parrish (exec.)

Stevie Nicks chronology
Timespace: The Best of Stevie Nicks (1991)	Street Angel (1994)	Enchanted (1998)

Singles from Street Angel
- 1. "Maybe Love Will Change Your Mind" Released: May 23, 1994; 2. "Blue Denim" Released: August 9, 1994

Professional ratings
Review scores
Source	Rating
AllMusic	2/5 stars
Music Week	3/5 stars
NME	3/10
Rolling Stone	2/5 stars

Street Angel is the fifth studio album by the American singer-songwriter Stevie Nicks. It was released on May 23, 1994, via Modern and Atlantic Records in the United States and EMI internationally. Recording for the album began in 1992, with Nicks originally working with producer Glyn Johns. However, the original sessions were hampered by Nicks' health and dependency on Klonopin. She would later enter rehab to end her addiction, and after listening to the completed album, was unsatisfied with it. She brought in Thom Panunzio to significantly remix the album and also brought along long-time collaborators such as Waddy Wachtel and Mike Campbell to overdub additional parts. The standard edition of the album includes thirteen songs, multiple of which were previous scrapped songs from years past. Bob Dylan is a featured artist on Nicks' cover of "Just Like a Woman".

Two singles were released from the album. "Maybe Love Will Change Your Mind" was released in May 1994 as the lead single. Despite receiving a positive reception amongst critics, it did not become a major hit, peaking at number 57 on the Billboard Hot 100, although it did peak within the top ten in Canada and nearly reached the UK top forty. The second and final single, "Blue Denim", did not enter the Billboard Hot 100, but did become a minor charting hit in Canada.

Upon release, Street Angel received mixed reviews from music critics, who felt that many of the songs did not measure up to her previous work. It also did not become a major chart success, peaking at number 45 on the Billboard 200. However, it did enter the top forty in album charts in Sweden and the United Kingdom. Despite the low peak position, it was certified Gold in the United States by the RIAA for shipments of 500,000 copies.

== Composition ==
Due to her continued dependency on Klonopin, Nicks was particularly uninspired during the creation of Street Angel, which led to recording scrapped songs from previous years, or recording songs she did not write. "Greta", "Destiny", "Love Is Like a River", and "Rose Garden" date back years prior to 1984, with "Rose Garden" being written in the early 70's. "Jane" and "Listen to the Rain" were written in the early 1990s. Nicks wrote "Jane" about Jane Goodall after meeting her in Dallas around the end of 1991. "Docklands" was originally released by the group Mint Juleps in 1987. Nicks recorded two songs written by Ethan Johns at the insistence of his father Glyn Johns, who served as a producer for Street Angel's initial recording sessions. Both songs were removed from the standard album and used as B-sides. Other songs were written by frequent collaborators Sandy Stewart & Rick Nowels.

Originally, the track "If You Were My Love", which Nicks had demoed for her 1981 debut album Bella Donna and for Fleetwood Mac's 1982 album Mirage, was slated to appear on this album. However, Nicks decided to remove it during the remastering with Panunzio. "If You Were My Love" was released on Nicks's 2014 album 24 Karat Gold: Songs from the Vault. Additionally, the song "I Call You Missing", which had been demoed for 1985's Rock a Little, was tried out for this album, but did not surface. "I Call You Missing" remains unreleased.

== Recording and production ==
Nicks was not happy with production work done by Glyn Johns on the sessions and spoke about the issues in an interview with Joe Benson: "And I didn't fix it while I was working with the person that I was working with (Johns)... who doesn't like to be talked about because he's not speaking to me, um... I didn't like it when he was there, and he knew it, and basically he told me to... like, in no uncertain English, very rough terms, to shut up and deal with it and this was the way it was going to be."

Regarding the song Blue Denim, Nicks stated, "it's a song about this guy who came into my life, but left just as quick. And his eyes were that intense, that it just makes you, even if you didn't know him, you would go, like, 'wow.' And you could be, like, the toughest person, but those eyes would make you be whatever he wanted you to be." Nicks later said in the video commentary of this song that the song was written about former lover Lindsey Buckingham.

Nicks met Bob Dylan in the 1980s after seeing one of his performances in Australia. During her time there, she informed him that she was interested in recording a cover of his song "Just Like a Woman". When the song was nearly complete, Nicks invited Dylan to present her rendition to him. Dylan declined Nicks' offer to sing vocals on the cover and instead recorded some guitar and harmonica. Nicks commented that "it was really important to me that he liked it" and that she would not have included the cover on Street Angel if Dylan was dissatisfied with it.

"This is not my record. So I went back in for about eight weeks and I didn't mess with the vocals, which I should have. But I was so sort of overwhelmed with trying to fix the things that I didn't like about the music, which was like... there was no percussion, there was no Waddy Wachtel. Because I was told that the last thing that I would need was Waddy Wachtel. And I, you know... I mean, to that comment I was so speechless that I just didn't do anything, I said ok. So when I went back in, I had Waddy come in and play, and I had Peter Michael come in and put percussion on, and Michael Campbell came back and put some more guitar on it, and we re-mixed everything, and we did a lot of other things besides that."

"I should have gone back in and really worked with the album, with the vocals. Because that's something that... I guess that was the last thing that I knew was wrong with it, and after being in two months trying to fix everything that I thought was wrong about the music and the mixes, it was almost kind of like, you know, maybe you just need to let this go and go on. I mean, this is three years now. And this record should have been out a long time ago. It may be new for everybody else, but it's really old for me."

The album suffered further as Nicks spent her second stint in drug rehabilitation (for Klonopin dependency) during the mixing and mastering period. The record label rushed the production so Nicks would be ready to promote the album once out of rehab, but this meant that she had no input into the overall sound or track listing of the album - these duties were overseen by co-producer Thom Panunzio, who had previously worked with Nicks' close friend Tom Petty. On coming out of rehab, Nicks returned to the studio (without Johns) to overdub and re-record a lot of what had already been done. Despite her efforts, the album did not turn out how she wanted. She was, however, able to present some of the album's tracks ("Street Angel", "Destiny", "Rose Garden" and "Blue Denim") in her own final mixes on the 3-disc Enchanted retrospective in 1998.

== Release ==
The album was released in 1994 during a particularly unhappy time in Nicks' life and career. It was the first album she released after her much publicized departure from Fleetwood Mac and during the tail end of her seven-year-long dependency on the prescription medication Klonopin. It is the lowest-charting record of her solo career, peaking at only No. 45 in the U.S. with first week sales of 38,000, and spent only three weeks within the top 100. However, the album has achieved Gold status there for shipping 500,000 copies.

Unlike all of her previous releases, the album did not yield any major hit singles, though "Maybe Love Will Change Your Mind" reached No. 57 on the Billboard Hot 100. A second single, "Blue Denim", reached No. 70 in Canada.

The album enjoyed slightly more prominence in the UK, where it peaked at No. 16. "Blue Denim" was originally lined up as the lead-release in the UK, and promotional copies were circulated to radio stations in April 1994, but it was replaced at the last moment by "Maybe Love Will Change Your Mind", which peaked at No. 42. The UK release of the "Maybe Love..." single featured two separate CD-single releases as an attempt to boost the song's chance of UK chart success (no promotional video was shot for the single, unlike "Blue Denim"), and included a newly recorded version of "Thousand Days" (originally demoed for her third solo album, Rock a Little).

== Track listing ==
No.	Title	Writer(s)	Length
1.	"Blue Denim"	Stevie Nicks, Mike Campbell	4:22
2.	"Greta"	Nicks, Campbell	4:18
3.	"Street Angel"	Nicks	4:09
4.	"Docklands"	Trevor Horn, Betsy Cook	4:47
5.	"Listen to the Rain"	Nicks, Monroe Jones, Scott Crago	4:33
6.	"Destiny"	Nicks	5:00
7.	"Unconditional Love"	Sandy Stewart, Dave Mundy	3:20
8.	"Love Is Like a River"	Nicks	4:44
9.	"Rose Garden"	Nicks	4:28
10.	"Maybe Love Will Change Your Mind"	Rick Nowels, Stewart	4:18
11.	"Just Like a Woman"	Bob Dylan	3:50
12.	"Kick It"	Nicks, Campbell	4:25
13.	"Jane"	Nicks, Joel Derouin	4:59
Total length:			57:30

Japanese edition
No.	Title	Writer(s)	Length
15.	"God's Garden"	Ethan Johns	6:00
16.	"Inspiration"	Johns	3:29

== B-sides ==
1. "Mirror, Mirror" – B-side to "Blue Denim" cassette single. Originally recorded for the Rock a Little album in 1984 and later surfaced during sessions for The Other Side of the Mirror in 1989 but was not included. Nicks later revealed that "Mirror, Mirror" was the original intended title for both albums. The version released as a B-side was recorded in 1984, but it was later revealed that a 1992 recording of the song was originally intended as the B-side and that the 1984 recording was added in error.
2. "Thousand Days" – B-side to the European CD single for "Blue Denim" and UK single for "Maybe Love Will Change Your Mind". Later appeared on disc 3 of the Enchanted box set. The song was originally written for the Rock a Little album, and demos were recorded, but the song was scrapped.
3. "Inspiration" – B-side to "Maybe Love". A song cut from the final album but included on the Japanese release as a bonus track.

== Personnel ==
- Stevie Nicks – lead vocals
- Benmont Tench – organ (1, 3–6, 8–13), synthesizers (1, 3–6, 8–13)
- Cat Gray – synthesizers (3, 12)
- Roy Bittan – acoustic piano (6, 7)
- Mike Campbell – guitars (1, 2, 11, 12)
- Bernie Leadon – guitars (1–4, 6, 8, 9, 11, 12)
- Andy Fairweather Low – guitars (1, 3–9, 11, 12)
- Waddy Wachtel – guitars (1–5, 7–13)
- Tim Pierce – guitars (7, 10, 13)
- Bob Dylan – guitar (11), harmonica (11)
- Pat Donaldson – bass guitar (1–6, 11)
- John Pierce – bass guitar (7, 10, 12)
- David Randi – bass guitar (8)
- Ron Blair – bass guitar (9)
- Ethan Johns – drums (1, 8, 9, 12), percussion (12), electric slide guitar (8, 9, 12)
- Kenny Aronoff – drums (2, 5, 7, 10, 11, 13)
- Peter Michael – percussion (1–5, 7–13), drums (6)
- Glyn Johns – percussion programming (3, 4)
- Joel Derouin – electric violin (2, 3, 5), synthesizers (13)
- Christopher Nicks – harmonica (2)
- Dave Koz – saxophone (7)
- David Crosby – harmony vocals (3)
- Sharon Celani – backing vocals (4–8, 10–13)
- Sara Fleetwood – backing vocals (4–8, 10–13)
- Lori Nicks – backing vocals (4–8, 11, 12, 13

== Production ==
- Glen Parrish – executive producer
- Stevie Nicks – producer
- Thom Panunzio – producer, recording (10, 13), mixing
- Roy Bittan – producer (10, 13)
- John Aguto – engineer
- Brian Scheuble – engineer, mixing
- Paul Dieter – recording (10, 13)
- Kevin Killen – recording (10, 13)
- Mike Baumgartner – assistant engineer
- Jim Champagne – assistant engineer
- Dave Hecht – assistant engineer
- Ed Korengo – assistant engineer
- Rail Rogut – assistant engineer
- Michael C. Ross – assistant engineer
- Eric Rudd – assistant engineer
- Eddy Schreyer – mastering
- C.A. Nicks – art direction, design, layout
- Paul Cox – photography

Studios

- Recorded at Ocean Way Recording and A&M Studios (Hollywood, California); Groove Masters (Santa Monica, California).
- Mastered at Future Disc (Hollywood, California).

== Promotion and tour ==
Nicks made an appearance on the Tonight Show with Jay Leno on August 24, 1994, performing "Blue Denim" and sat down for an interview with Leno.{{|date=September 2026}} She also performed the song on The Late Show with David Letterman and sat down for an interview in which she discussed the Bill Clinton inauguration.{{|date=September 2026}}

Nicks toured in support of the album across the United States during 1994. Although praised for her post-klonopin vocals, she was criticised for her weight gain and once the tour was over, vowed never to walk on stage again until she had reached a more reasonable weight.

Set list

- "Outside the Rain"
- "Dreams"
- "Docklands" (replaced with "Rooms on Fire" later in the tour)
- "No Spoken Word" (dropped early in the tour)
- "Maybe Love Will Change Your Mind"
- "Rhiannon"
- "Stand Back"
- "Destiny"
- "Gold Dust Woman"
- "Talk to Me"
- "Blue Denim"
- "How Still My Love" (dropped early in the tour)
- "Edge of Seventeen"

Encore

- "The Chain" (played at the House of Blues shows with ex-Fleetwood Mac member Rick Vito)
- "I Need to Know"
- "Has Anyone Ever Written Anything for You"

Tour dates

- July 14, 1994 The Roxbury, Los Angeles, California
- July 22, 1994 Great Woods, Mansfield, Massachusetts
- July 24, 1994 Jones Beach Amphitheatre, Wantagh, New York
- July 26, 1994 Saratoga Performing Arts Center, Saratoga, New York
- July 27, 1994 Finger Lakes Performing Arts Center, Canandaigua, New York
- July 29, 1994 Starlake Amphitheatre, Burgettstown, Pennsylvania
- July 30, 1994 Mann Music Centre, Philadelphia, Pennsylvania
- August 1, 1994 Garden State Arts Center, Holmdel, New Jersey
- August 2, 1994 Ed Sullivan Theater, New York, New York
- August 4, 1994 Walnut Creek Amphitheatre, Raleigh, North Carolina
- August 5, 1994 Merriweather Post Pavilion, Columbia, Maryland
- August 6, 1994 Classic Amphitheatre, Richmond, Virginia
- August 8, 1994 Chastain Park Amphitheatre, Atlanta, Georgia
- August 10, 1994 Blossom Music Center, Cuyahoga Falls, Ohio
- August 13, 1994 Milwaukee State Fairgrounds, Milwaukee, Wisconsin
- August 14, 1994 Poplar Creek Music Theatre, Poplar Creek, Illinois
- August 16, 1994 Riverport Amphitheatre, Maryland Heights, Missouri
- August 17, 1994 Sandstone Amphitheatre, Bonner Springs, Kansas
- August 19, 1994 Pine Knob Amphitheatre, Clarkston, Michigan
- August 20, 1994 Celeste Center, Columbus, Ohio
- August 25, 1994 Greek Theatre, Los Angeles, California
- August 26, 1994 Greek Theatre, Los Angeles, California
- August 28, 1994 Concord Pavilion, Concord, California
- August 29, 1994 Arco Arena, Sacramento, California
- August 31, 1994 Irvine Meadows, Irvine, California
- September 2, 1994 Shoreline Amphitheatre, Mountainview, California
- September 3, 1994 Compton Terrace, Phoenix, Arizona
- September 5, 1994 Aladdin Theatre, Las Vegas, Nevada
- September 7, 1994 Fiddler's Green Amphitheatre, Denver, Colorado
- September 9, 1994 Woods Pavilion, Houston, Texas
- September 10, 1994 Starplex Amphitheatre, Dallas, Texas
- September 17, 1994 House of Blues, Hollywood, California
- September 18, 1994 House of Blues, Hollywood, California

Notes

- The final night at the House of Blues, Hollywood was recorded for a radio broadcast.

"Has Anyone Ever Written Anything for You" included a dedication. The song including the dedication were omitted from the CD and Westwood One Radio claims they no longer have the original master recording.

== Charts ==
Chart (1994)	Peak position
Australian Albums (ARIA)	43
European Top 100 Albums (Music & Media)	87
German Albums (Offizielle Top 100)	67
Swedish Albums (Sverigetopplistan)	30
UK Albums (Official Charts)	16
US Billboard 200	45
US Cash Box Top 100 Albums	47

Chart (2024)	Peak position
Hungarian Physical Albums (MAHASZ)	40

== Certifications ==
Region	Certification	Certified units/sales
United States (RIAA)	Gold	500,000^{^}
^{^} Shipments figures based on certification alone.
