= Long Way to Go (Stevie Nicks song) =

Single by Stevie Nicks

from the album The Other Side of the Mirror
- B-side: "Real Tears"
- Released: July 31, 1989
- Genre: Rock
- Length: 4:06
- Label: Modern
- Songwriter(s): Stevie Nicks; Rick Nowels; Charles Judge
- Producer(s): Rupert Hine

Stevie Nicks singles chronology
"Rooms on Fire" (1989)	"Long Way to Go" (1989)	"Two Kinds of Love" (1989)

"Long Way to Go" is a 1989 song by American singer and songwriter Stevie Nicks, from her fourth solo studio album The Other Side of the Mirror (1989). It was released in July 1989 as the second single from the album. Written by Nicks, Rick Nowels and Charles Judge, the song was conceptualized and lyrics written by Nicks in late 1985 after an altercation with her former lover, Joe Walsh.

"Long Way to Go" reached number 11 on the US Billboard Mainstream Rock chart and number 60 on the UK Singles Chart in 1989.

== Background and composition ==
Nicks said the following about the song in an interview in 1989:

"I remain real good friends with most of the men in my life. 'Long Way to Go' was not written in such a nice way. This happened to be an experience that I had with somebody that I did very much love, who... we had been broken up for a long time before, a year before, and I had just finished Rock a Little, and I had walked into my house with Rock a Little under my arm, an acetate... the phone rang, and it was him, and he wanted me to drive two and a half hours to wherever it was that he lived... and I was very tired, and it was very late, it was like 3:30, 4 in the morning, and I turned around to somebody that was living in my house at that time, and I said, 'should I go?' And they said, 'well, it's a pretty long way to go to say goodbye again... And so I went back and forth and back and forth in my mind, and finally he said to me 'I'm sending a limousine for you.' And I said alright.

And so... chump that I was, I got in the car and drove down there and played the record for him, and he kept it. Which I will never forgive him for. He kept my first acetate disc. And I think the last thing that I did say to him was, 'you know, it's a real long way to go to say goodbye again. I thought we already did that. Have fun, tell the world.' Which basically means words we don't say over the radio. Goodbye. Forever this time. Don't ever call me again. I mean, he put me in the car, and I was hysterical in tears, and I cried all the way home, and I said, 'I will never, ever, ever put myself in that position again. Nobody will ever do that to me again. As much as I loved him, I will never let that happen again."

== Charts ==
=== Weekly charts ===
Chart (1989)	Peak position
Germany (GfK)	60
UK Singles (OCC)	60
US Mainstream Rock (Billboard)	11
