= Lady (Stevie Nicks song) =

Single by Stevie Nicks

from the album 24 Karat Gold: Songs from the Vault
- Released: August 26, 2014
- Recorded: April 20 – May 5, 2014
- Genre: Soft rock
- Length: 4:58
- Label: Warner Brothers
- Songwriter: Stevie Nicks
- Producers: Stevie Nicks, Dave Stewart, Waddy Wachtel

Stevie Nicks singles chronology
"The Dealer" (2014)	"Lady" (2014)	"Starshine" (2014)

"Lady" is a 2014 song by the American singer/songwriter Stevie Nicks. It was the second single from her solo album 24 Karat Gold: Songs from the Vault. Nicks shot a music video on July 28, 2014. It was released on September 4, 2014. Nicks said the song is the first song she ever wrote on a piano.

== Music video ==
A lyric video was first released by music video director Brad Strickman. On September 4, 2014, the music video for the song was released, directed by Paul Boyd. He went on to direct two other music videos from the same album.

In the second video, Nicks is singing alone on a stage with Dave Stewart playing the piano in the background. The video was filmed in Ace Theatre in Los Angeles.
