= Rooms on Fire =

1989 single by Stevie Nicks

Single by Stevie Nicks

from the album The Other Side of the Mirror
- B-side: "Alice"; "Has Anyone Ever Written Anything for You?" (live)
- Released: April 24, 1989
- Genre: Pop
- Length: 4:35
- Label: Modern; Atlantic; EMI
- Songwriters: Stevie Nicks; Rick Nowels
- Producer: Rupert Hine

Stevie Nicks singles chronology
"Imperial Hotel" (1986)	"Rooms on Fire" (1989)	"Long Way to Go" (1989)

Music video
- "Rooms on Fire" on YouTube

"Rooms on Fire" is a song by American singer and songwriter Stevie Nicks from her fourth solo studio album The Other Side of the Mirror (1989). Written by Nicks and Rick Nowels, and produced by Rupert Hine, the song was released on April 24, 1989, via Modern Records, as the lead single from the album. The 12-inch single was released in a limited-edition poster sleeve in certain territories.

"Rooms on Fire" was successful on both sides of the Atlantic, reaching number 16 on the UK Singles Chart and on the US Billboard Hot 100 while topping the Billboard Album Rock Tracks chart. In the United Kingdom, it was Nicks' first solo top-40 hit and remains her highest-charting single. The single was also successful in Canada and New Zealand, reaching no. 9 and no. 12 respectively.

In the accompanying music video for "Rooms on Fire", directed by Marty Callner, Nicks is seen holding a baby dressed in white, played by her goddaughter. "Rooms on Fire" was performed sporadically at Nicks' live concerts up until New Year's Eve of 1999, though it has yet to be played live since then. Nearly 30 years after original release, Nicks planned to sing "Rooms on Fire" on the 24 Karat Gold Tour, but the song was cut from the setlist.

== Background and composition ==
In a 1989 interview with Record Mirror, Nicks commented that the song was about being awestruck by a person entering the room and how the sensation can create the impression of her surroundings being set ablaze. Nicks elaborated on the song's lyrics in the liner notes of Timespace: The Best of Stevie Nicks, saying that they were inspired by her brief relationship with Rupert Hine.

"The night I met Rupert Hine was a dangerous one. He was different from anyone else I had ever known...He was older, and he was smarter, and we both knew it. I hired him to do the album before we even started talking about music. It seemed that we had made a spiritual agreement to do a magic album...in a fabulous Dutch castle, at the top of the mountain. We recorded it in the formal dining room...where, upon the walls hung all these very old and expensive pieces of art...looking at us...we were never alone."

"It always seemed to me that whenever Rupert walked into one of these old, dark castle rooms, that the rooms were on fire. There was a connection between us that everyone around us instantly picked up on, and everyone was very careful to respect our space...our TIMESPACE, so we all lived at the castle for about four-and-a-half months. I went home with him to England to mix the album at his studio...he left in December. I joined him there in London in January. We left immediately for his studio, Farmyard Studios, somewhere outside London. It was like being in a cottage in Wales, it was a little spooky...the atmosphere was like nothing I had ever experienced. Then something happened to him that simply made it impossible for us to ever be together again. I left him there...the rooms were still burning, but the fire had been stolen from us. It wasn't over love, in fact...it had nothing to do with love. It was just a bad situation. I came back to Los Angeles, a very changed woman. And now, long nets of white...cloud my memory...Now I remember the rooms, the music, and how truly magic the whole thing was..."

== Release ==
"Rooms on Fire" was first released in the United Kingdom on April 24, 1989, via Modern Records and EMI. Its release date was pushed up after promotional copies were leaked and began receiving unsolicited airplay on some major radio stations.

== Critical reception ==
Cashbox called "Rooms on Fire" a "serviceable tune" with "some nice acoustic guitar work." Billboard felt that Hine's production gave the song a particular "edge". David Browne of the New York Daily News described the single as having some of "that old [Fleetwood] Mac warmth." Jerry Smith of Music Week predicted that the song was "destined for the charts." Tim Nicholson of Record Mirror called the song "swishy and woosy" and expressed his belief that Nicks' solo music sounded too similar to her work with Fleetwood Mac. Melody Maker reviewers labeled the song as "small and badly ventilated" with "an aimless, earthbound kangarooing of guitars that never even hints at take-off." Nicholas Johnston of The Age gave the track a mixed review, pointing out that although "there's no denying the voice," it is not an alluring track. The Manila Standard praised its "hypnotic beat" and "Nicks' always entertaining vocals."

== Track listings ==
US 7-inch and cassette single

1. "Rooms on Fire" (7-inch remix) – 4:32
2. "Alice" – 5:50

International 7-inch single and Japanese mini-CD single

1. "Rooms on Fire" – 4:20 (4:26 in Japan)
2. "Alice" – 5:46 (5:41 in Japan)

UK 12-inch, CD, and cassette single

1. "Rooms on Fire" – 8:56
2. "Alice" – 5:46
3. "Has Anyone Ever Written Anything for You?" (live version) – 5:00

== Personnel ==
- Stevie Nicks – lead vocals, percussion
- Lori Perry Nicks – backing vocals
- Sharon Celani – backing vocals
- Rick Nowels – guitars
- Jamie West-Oram – guitars
- Vail Johnson – bass guitar
- Rupert Hine – keyboards, percussion
- Geoff Dugmore – drums

== Charts ==
=== Weekly charts ===
Chart (1989)	Peak position
Australia (ARIA)	23
Belgium (Ultratop 50 Flanders)	30
Canada Top Singles (RPM)	9
Canada Adult Contemporary (RPM)	11
Europe (Eurochart Hot 100)	55
Germany (GfK)	46
Ireland (IRMA)	17
Netherlands (Dutch Top 40)	15
Netherlands (Single Top 100)	20
New Zealand (Recorded Music NZ)	12
UK Singles (Official Charts)	16
US Billboard Hot 100	16
US Adult Contemporary (Billboard)	16
US Mainstream Rock (Billboard)	1
US Cash Box Top 100	16
US Adult Contemporary (Gavin Report)	6
US Top 40 (Gavin Report)	15
US Adult Contemporary (Radio & Records)	11
US AOR Tracks (Radio & Records)	1
US Contemporary Hit Radio (Radio & Records)	18

=== Year-end charts ===
Chart (1989)	Position
Canada Top Singles (RPM)	73
US Album Rock Tracks (Billboard)	12
US Adult Contemporary (Gavin Report)	57
US AOR Tracks (Radio & Records)	14

== Release history ==
Region	Date	Format(s)	Label(s)	Ref.
United Kingdom	April 24, 1989	7-inch vinyl; 12-inch vinyl; CD	Modern; EMI	
United Kingdom	May 1, 1989	Cassette	Modern; EMI	
Japan	May 24, 1989	Mini-CD	Modern; EMI	
