= Reconsider Me (Warren Zevon song) =

- European release picture sleeve

Single by Warren Zevon

from the album Sentimental Hygiene
- Released: August 29, 1987
- Recorded: 1987
- Genre: Rock
- Length: 3:09
- Songwriter: Warren Zevon
- Producers: Warren Zevon, Niko Bolas, Andrew Slater

"Reconsider Me" is a single from Warren Zevon's 1987 album Sentimental Hygiene. The song failed to chart, but became a live staple in Zevon's concert performances. In 2006, a set of love songs were released under the name: Reconsider Me: The Love Songs.

== Personnel ==
- Warren Zevon – acoustic guitar, piano, vocals
- Mike Campbell – guitar
- Jorge Calderón – backing vocals
- Craig Krampf – drums
- Tony Levin – bass guitar
- Jai Winding – keyboards

== Stevie Nicks version ==
"Reconsider Me"

Single by Stevie Nicks

from the album Enchanted
- Released: April 21, 1998
- Recorded: 1984
- Genre: Rock
- Length: 4:06
- Songwriters: Warren Zevon; Stevie Nicks
- Producers: Stevie Nicks; Jimmy Iovine; Andrew Slater

Stevie Nicks singles chronology
"If You Ever Did Believe" (1998)	"Reconsider Me" (1998)	"Every Day" (2001)

In 1984, Zevon presented "Reconsider Me" to Jimmy Iovine. Iovine gave the song to Stevie Nicks and it was recorded for her 1984 album Mirror, Mirror. The album was pulled from release, and the song was left unreleased until 1998 when Nicks released her box set, Enchanted Nicks said in the Enchanted box set, "Jimmy Iovine brought me this song, I think Jimmy and I were fighting, and for some reason... wasn't in a very "reconsider me" state of mind. I don't think Jimmy ever forgave me for not trusting his judgment." Nicks was given a co-writing credit despite having made only insubstantial lyric changes – a word here and there – and merely moving verses and choruses around.

=== Personnel ===
- Stevie Nicks – vocals, percussion
- Don Henley – backing vocals
- Waddy Wachtel – guitar
- Sharon Celani – backing vocals
- Lori Nicks – backing vocals
- Bob Glaub – bass guitar
- Matt Chamberlain – drums
- Patrick Warren – chamberlain
- Steve Goldstein – synthesizer
- Benmont Tench – piano
- Roy Bittan – keyboards
