= Rock a Little =

1985 studio album by Stevie Nicks

Studio album by Stevie Nicks
- Released: November 18, 1985
- Recorded: 1984–1985
- Genres: Pop rock; synth-rock
- Length: 45:20
- Label: Modern
- Producers: Jimmy Iovine; Rick Nowels; Mike Campbell; Chas Sandford; Keith Olsen

Stevie Nicks chronology
The Wild Heart (1983)	Rock a Little (1985)	The Other Side of the Mirror (1989)

Singles from Rock a Little
- 1. "Talk to Me" Released: October 28, 1985 (US); 2. "I Can't Wait" Released: October 28, 1985 (Australia); 3. "Has Anyone Ever Written Anything for You?" Released: May 1986; 4. "Imperial Hotel" Released: September 1986

Rock a Little is the third solo studio album by American singer and songwriter Stevie Nicks, released on November 18, 1985, by Modern Records.

Released in late 1985 while Fleetwood Mac were still on a lengthy hiatus following their album Mirage (1982), Rock a Little hit the top 20 in its second week. The album peaked at No. 12 on the US Billboard 200, and was certified Platinum by the Recording Industry Association of America (RIAA) after just one month of its release for sales in excess of 1,000,000 copies. The album was also certified Gold in the United Kingdom for sales in excess of 100,000 copies. The album was ranked No. 41 in the best-selling albums of 1986 in the United States, although sales did not match Nicks' earlier albums, Bella Donna (1981) and The Wild Heart (1983) (which have sold in excess of four and two million copies in the US, respectively).

Rock a Little spawned the singles "Talk to Me" (US No. 4), "I Can't Wait" (US No. 16), and the mainstay encore for Nicks' live shows "Has Anyone Ever Written Anything for You?" (US No. 60). A fourth single, "Imperial Hotel", was released in Australia only.

== Album history ==
Recording for her follow-up project to 1983's multi-platinum album The Wild Heart originally began in 1984. The initial sessions took place at a converted church studio in Dallas owned by Gordon Perry. By the end of those sessions, which lasted one month, Nicks emerged with around six tracks that she believed could be developed further. Two of those songs were "Running Through the Garden" and "Mirror Mirror". However, Nicks scrapped these recordings and parted ways with long-time producer and romantic interest Jimmy Iovine, and in late 1984 began work on what is now recognized as the Rock a Little project. Nicks later called the initial sessions with Iovine a "bad planning move" and that she put Iovine "in a very weird position" as she gave him little direction on how to approach her songs. "Running Through the Garden" would resurface in completed form in 2003 on the Fleetwood Mac album Say You Will. Keith Olsen, Rick Nowels and Nicks herself took over production duties after Iovine's departure.

The album is reputed to have cost $1 million to record (according to Mick Fleetwood in his autobiography). It was later revealed that Martin Page and Bernie Taupin had specially written the track "These Dreams" for inclusion on the album, but Nicks turned it down. The track was then recorded by the band Heart and became their first number 1 hit in 1986. Tom Petty and David A. Stewart also wrote "Don't Come Around Here No More" for the album, but after hearing Petty perform the vocals for her, she declined it as well, feeling she could not do the song justice. Tom Petty and the Heartbreakers would record and release the song on their 1985 album Southern Accents. Nicks' subsequent relationship with Eagles member Joe Walsh produced the ballad "Has Anyone Ever Written Anything for You".

Nicks had recorded various other tracks prior to the album's release, including "Battle Of The Dragon". Rather than include on her own album, it was featured on the movie soundtrack for American Anthem, and later included on Nicks' 3-disc retrospective boxset Enchanted in 1998. A duet with Eagles drummer and former lover Don Henley titled "Reconsider Me" would also see the cutting room floor, and the rock ballad "One More Big Time Rock and Roll Star" was relegated to the B-side of the "Talk to Me" single.

Many other discarded demos from the sessions have never seen the light of day, but a few, including "Greta" and "Love Is Like A River", were dusted off for Nicks' 1994 album, Street Angel. The song "Thousand Days" was also relegated to a B-side. "Mirror, Mirror" was tried out again for 1989's The Other Side of the Mirror, and was again revisited in 1994 for inclusion on Street Angel, but ultimately the original Rock a Little version was only released on a cassette single of "Blue Denim" in 1994.

== Release and reception ==
Professional ratings
Review scores
Source	Rating
AllMusic	3.5/5 stars
Chicago Tribune	(Favorable)
The New York Times	(Favorable)
People	(Positive)
Rolling Stone	(Mixed)

Upon its release in November 1985, Rock a Little received mixed reviews. Mark Coleman of Rolling Stone said that the album was "quite earnest and usually fairly tuneful", adding that "for a pop album, Rock a Little sounds strangely distant, out of touch." Cashbox thought that Nicks was "in top form" and a "formidable commercial force" on Rock a Little. Billboard anticipated that Rock a Little would achieve strong sales and yield several additional hit singles, specifically highlighting "The Nightmare" and "No Spoken Word" as likely candidates.

Combined with Nicks' growing addiction to cocaine at the time which hampered her tour performances, the album did not achieve sales or chart positions expected of Nicks at that time. It entered the U.S. Billboard chart at No. 60, eventually peaking at No. 12 in its ninth week of release. The album spent 35 weeks on the Billboard 200 chart, including 13 weeks in the Top 20.

== Track listing ==
Side one
No.	Title	Writer(s)	Producer(s)	Length
1.	"I Can't Wait"	Stevie Nicks; Rick Nowels; Eric Pressly	Jimmy Iovine; Rick Nowels	4:37
2.	"Rock a Little (Go Ahead Lily)"	Nicks	Iovine	3:39
3.	"Sister Honey"	Nicks; Les Dudek	Nowels	3:50
4.	"I Sing for the Things"	Nicks	Iovine	3:45
5.	"Imperial Hotel"	Nicks; Mike Campbell	Mike Campbell; Iovine	2:53
6.	"Some Become Strangers"	David Williams; Amy Latelevision; Peter Rafelson	Iovine	3:30

Side two
No.	Title	Writer(s)	Producer(s)	Length
7.	"Talk to Me"	Chas Sandford	Chas Sandford; Iovine	4:10
8.	"The Nightmare"	Nicks; Chris Nicks	Nowels	5:23
9.	"If I Were You"	Nicks; Nowels	Nowels	4:11
10.	"No Spoken Word"	Nicks	Keith Olsen	4:14
11.	"Has Anyone Ever Written Anything for You?"	Nicks; Keith Olsen	Nowels	4:38

=== Alternative versions and 12-inch releases ===
- "I Can't Wait" was released as a 12-inch single in an extended 6:00 rock version in many territories, but the UK release exclusively included a longer and different version of the album track "Rock a Little (Go Ahead Lily)" running at 5:12, currently unavailable on any other release.
- "Has Anyone Ever Written Anything for You?" was also released in a 12-inch version in the UK, and included a 'dub' rock version of "I Can't Wait", clocking in at 5:50.
- All 7-inch and 12-inch releases of "Talk to Me" included the non-album track "One More Big Time Rock and Roll Star", written by Nicks, which later appeared with a slightly truncated ending on her 1998 retrospective boxset, Enchanted.

== Personnel ==
- Stevie Nicks – lead vocals, synthesizers (8)
- Rick Nowels – E-mu Emulator II (1), Oberheim OB-8 (1), Prophet-5 (1), backing vocals (1, 8, 9, 10), synthesizers (2, 3, 4, 8), guitars (9)
- Jamie Sheriff – PPG Wave (1), programming (1), synth string programming (2), E-mu Emulator programming (3, 11)
- Bill Payne – synthesizers (2)
- Charles Judge – synthesizers (3, 4, 8, 9, 11), acoustic piano (11)
- Benmont Tench – acoustic piano (4), organ (5)
- Greg Phillinganes – keyboards (6), synthesizers (6), timpani (7)
- Chas Sandford – Ensoniq Mirage (7), electric guitar (7), 6-string guitar (7), 12-string guitar (7), bass (7), drum machine (7)
- Bill Cuomo – keyboards (10)
- Michael Landau – guitars (1, 3, 6, 8, 9, 11)
- George Black – guitars (1, 3), bass (1), LinnDrum programming (1), backing vocals (1, 3, 8), synth bass (3, 8), drums (8)
- Waddy Wachtel – guitars (2, 10)
- Les Dudek – guitars (3)
- Danny Kortchmar – guitars (4)
- Mike Campbell – guitars (5)
- Kenny Edwards – bass (2)
- Bob Glaub – bass (4, 5, 6)
- Mike Porcaro – bass (10)
- Steve Jordan – drums (2, 5, 6)
- Russ Kunkel – drums (4)
- Andy Newmark – drums (8, 9)
- Denny Carmassi – drums (10)
- Bobbye Hall – percussion (4)
- David Kemper – tambourine (9), percussion (11)
- Barney Wilen – saxophone (7)
- Sharon Celani – backing vocals (1–10)
- Marilyn Martin – backing vocals (1, 2, 3, 5, 6, 10)
- Lori Perry-Nicks – backing vocals
- Maria Vidal – backing vocals (1, 2, 7, 8)
- Carolyn Brooks – backing vocals (11)

=== Technical credits ===
- Dave Hernandez – engineer (1)
- John Koverek – engineer (1, 3, 8, 9, 11), mixing (11)
- Shelly Yakus – engineer (2, 4), mixing (2, 4, 5, 7)
- Gabe Veltri – overdub engineer (2, 7), engineer (3, 5, 6, 8)
- Robert Feist – engineer (3, 9)
- David Leonard – engineer (3)
- Don Smith – overdub engineer (6), mixing (7)
- Chas Sandford – engineer (7), mixing (7)
- Gary Skardina – engineer (9)
- Brian Foraker – engineer (10)
- Dennis Sager – engineer (10)
- George Black – mixing (1, 3)
- Jimmy Iovine – mixing (1)
- Chris Lord-Alge – mixing (1)
- Rick Nowels – mixing (1, 3)
- Mick Guzauski – mixing (6)
- Herńan Rojas – mixing (8)
- Csaba Pectoz – mixing (9)
- Keith Olsen – mixing (10)
- Tom "Gondo" Gondolf – additional engineer
- Tom Swift – additional engineer
- John Agnello – assistant engineer
- Carol Cafiero – assistant engineer
- Mark Corbrin – assistant engineer
- Dan Garcia – assistant engineer
- David Glover – assistant engineer
- Steve Hirsch – assistant engineer
- Glen Holguin – assistant engineer
- Jon Ingoldsby – assistant engineer
- Bill Jackson – assistant engineer
- Robin Laine – assistant engineer
- Ray Leonard – assistant engineer
- Paul Levy – assistant engineer
- Casey McMackin – assistant engineer
- Frank Pekoc – assistant engineer
- Alex Schmoll – assistant engineer
- Duane Seykora – assistant engineer
- Paul Wertheimer – assistant engineer
- Bruce Wildstein – assistant engineer
- Ernie Wilkens – assistant engineer
- Barry Diament – mastering

=== Production credits ===
- Debbie Caponetta – production coordinator
- Beth Jacobson – production coordinator
- Nina King – production coordinator
- Tim McDaniel – production coordinator
- Glen Parrish – personal manager
- Michael Hodgson – art direction, design
- Tony McGee – front cover photography
- Herbert Worthington – back cover photography, inner sleeve photography
- Stevie Nicks – handtinting back photography
- John Reed Forsman – additional photography

== Music videos ==
Promotional videos were shot for the singles "Talk to Me" and "I Can't Wait". In 1986 a 6-track VHS tape titled I Can't Wait was released in many territories, and featured the following promos:

- "Stop Draggin' My Heart Around"
- "Leather and Lace" (Live, 1981 Bella Donna Tour)
- "Stand Back"
- "If Anyone Falls"
- "Talk to Me"
- "I Can't Wait"

This release is notable for including a live solo performance of "Leather and Lace" from the last night of Nicks' 1981 Bella Donna Tour, which was cut from the VHS release of White Wing Dove: Stevie Nicks Live, a 9-track edit of the same concert. The version was used as the song's music video, and was played on MTV in 1981.

Five of these promos are included on the DVD supplement to Nicks' 2008 collection Crystal Visions — The Very Best of Stevie Nicks, but the only DVD availability of the live version of "Leather and Lace" is the Australian release of Fleetwood Mac's Mirage Tour concert, for which all six videos of the I Can't Wait collection are included as a special bonus feature.

== Tour ==
The US leg of the Rock a Little Tour kicked off in 1986 and concluded with a show at the famous Red Rocks Amphitheatre in Colorado, which was captured and released on video (and later on DVD) usually entitled Live at Red Rocks. Evidence of Nicks' drug abuse is apparent in both performance and vocals, but the show is noticeably 'cleaned up' with re-shot close-ups, inserts and vocal overdubs. The video/DVD is also a shortened version of the actual setlist, clocking in at 57 minutes, 15 of which are devoted to "Edge of Seventeen", though this was adjusted on the DVD release.

== Charts ==
=== Weekly charts ===
Weekly chart performance for Rock a Little
Chart (1986)	Peak position
Australian Albums (Kent Music Report)	5
Canada Top Albums/CDs (RPM)	11
Dutch Albums (Album Top 100)	48
European Albums (Music & Media)	18
German Albums (Offizielle Top 100)	23
New Zealand Albums (RMNZ)	25
Spanish Albums (AFYVE)	28
Swedish Albums (Sverigetopplistan)	14
UK Albums (Official Charts)	30
US Billboard 200	12
US Cash Box Top 200 Albums	13

=== Year-end charts ===
Chart (1986)	Position
Australian Albums (Kent Music Report)	6
Canada Top Albums/CDs (RPM)	53
US Billboard 200	41
US Cash Box Top 200 Albums	46

== Certifications ==
Region	Certification	Certified units/sales
Australia	—	100,000
United Kingdom (BPI)	Gold	100,000^{^}
United States (RIAA)	Platinum	1,000,000^{^}
^{^} Shipments figures based on certification alone.
