= Carolyn Brooks =

American microbiologist

Carolyn Branch Brooks (born July 8, 1946) is an American microbiologist known for her research in immunology, nutrition, and crop productivity. In 2018, she was named a faculty member emerita at University of Maryland Eastern Shore where she was an award-winning educator for more than three decades.

== Early life and education ==
Brooks was born July 8, 1946, in Richmond, Virginia to Shirley Booker Branch and Charles Walker Branch, grocery store owners. Her grandparents and her older sister also helped raise her. She attended high school on the north side of Richmond. In the 1950s, the family moved to the west side of town and this made schooling a little more difficult for the children because they had to take public transportation. Brooks wanted to attend her old school so every day she would ride the public bus across town. “Every day, Carolyn simply got on, paid her fare, and sat behind the driver, without realizing that, according to the segregation laws of the time, she should have sat at the back of the bus. When the first Civil Rights demonstrations began in Richmond, she discovered that she had been an activist without knowing it.”

As a young student she attended a special summer school for African American science students held at Virginia Union University in Richmond. Here she was inspired by a guest speaker's work in medical microbiology. Along with the support of parents, Brooks had many great teachers who encouraged her to pursue her interests in science. After being offered scholarships to six different universities, she chose to attend Tuskegee Institute (University) in Alabama to study microbiology. Self-described as a city girl, it was at Tuskegee that she discovered her passion for agriculture - particularly after learning about George Washington Carver, a former slave and first head of the Tuskegee Agriculture Department who promoted alternative crops to cotton. At the end of her second year of study, she married Henry Brooks, an agricultural education student at Tuskegee. Brooks was impressed that “the university did so much for the community.” Not only that, but “the rural communities my husband served took us in as their own. It was then that I came to understand how land-grant universities are so important." In her undergraduate career she had her first two children, both boys. She graduated in 1968 and then went on to get a master's degree from Tuskegee. She had her next child, a daughter during this time. While earning her PhD in microbiology from Ohio State University, she had her fourth child, another daughter.

== Research ==
Her doctoral research focused on how T cells destroy the malaria parasite Plasmodium. She then went on to study nutritional needs of the elderly at Kentucky State University. Through her research, she discovered a connection between trace amounts of minerals in a patient's hair and diet, thereby enabling the recognition of some medical problems caused by poor diet. In 1981, Dr. Brooks accepted a research and mentoring position at the University of Maryland Eastern Shore (UMES) in Princess Anne, Maryland. After 13 years at UMES, she became the dean of the School of Agricultural and Natural Sciences and the research director of the 1890 Land-Grant Programs. In 1997, she became the executive director to the president and chief of staff. Starting in 2007, she additionally served as executive director of Association of 1890 Research Directors, an organization of administrators specializing in agriculture and food sciences at the nation’s 19 historically black land-grant universities. Her commitment to the 1890 Land-Grant Universities is reflected in her statement, “My 1890 university colleagues are a close community of dear friends who believe—as I do—in giving back and finding ways to not just sustain, but to enhance the universities’ mission of advancing all”.

Dr. Brooks' research at UMES focused on agricultural productivity. This includes increasing plant resistance to predators through multiple methods including the development of microbial insecticides and employing the use various agricultural practices (e.g. the use of poultry litter, calf weaning, and composting), and relationships with microbes. Brooks' microbial work focused broadly on symbiosis, including the relationship between nitrogen-fixing bacteria and the legume family and other specific interactions between microbes and various crops, including strawberries.

Dr. Brooks' has conducted research in several countries, including Togo, Nigeria, Senegal, Cameroon, and Egypt.

== Global impact ==
During the years of 1984-85, she traveled to Togo and Senegal in West Africa. Here she researched methods to increase productivity of the African groundnut, eventually leading to increased productivity of many different food crops in West Africa. As a member of the USAID-USDA team, she assisted in establishing collaborative relationships with research centers and universities in South Africa. She also formally represented UMES in meetings with Egyptian universities.

== Awards and achievements ==
- Dr. Brooks was credited with attracting more than $4 million in external funding to support research and teaching initiatives as a UMES faculty member and administrator.
- Award at the first annual White House Initiative on Historically Black Colleges and Universities in 1988 given to professors for "exemplary achievements as educators, researchers, and role models"
- Published over 50 journal papers and received the Faculty Award for "Excellence in Science and Technology" through the White House initiative for HBCUs.
- Award from Maryland Association for Higher Education in 1990
- George Washington Carver Public Service Hall of Fame Award from the Professional Agricultural Workers Conference in 2013

She was the Minton Laureate from the American Society of Microbiology, was inducted into the USDA NIFA Hall of Fame, was recognized as one of Maryland’s 100 Top Women and received the Excellence in Leadership Award from the Experiment Station Section from the Association of Public Land Grant Universities.
