= After the Glitter Fades =

Single by Stevie Nicks

from the album Bella Donna
- B-side: "Think About It"
- Written: 1972
- Released: April 30, 1982
- Recorded: 1980–1981
- Genre: Country rock
- Length: 3:31
- Label: Modern
- Songwriter: Stevie Nicks
- Producer: Jimmy Iovine

Stevie Nicks singles chronology
"Edge of Seventeen" (1981)	"After the Glitter Fades" (1982)	"Stand Back" (1983)

"After the Glitter Fades" is a song by American singer-songwriter Stevie Nicks, released as the fourth and final single from her debut solo album Bella Donna (1981). Written by Nicks and produced by Jimmy Iovine, it was originally written a decade before its inclusion on Bella Donna. The track lyrically reflects on the shallow nature of fame in comparison to the lasting, authentic feelings that remain after it ends. Modern Records released it on April 30, 1982.

The least successful single from the album, "After the Glitter Fades" peaked at number 32 on the US Billboard Hot 100, and became a minor hit on both the Adult Contemporary and Hot Country Songs charts. Originally a staple in Nicks' setlists, she last performed the song in 1998 for VH1 Storytellers. Alexis Petridis of The Guardian ranked it as the 19th best song by Nicks.

== Background ==
Nicks originally wrote the song back in 1972. While her musical and romantic partner Lindsey Buckingham was on tour with the Everly Brothers, she took to a notepad and wrote what would become "Rhiannon", "Landslide", and "After the Glitter Fades". The words to "After the Glitter Fades" most likely came from when Nicks was living with Barry McGuire, dreaming about the future. Nicks originally intended for the song to be sung by country singer Dolly Parton, feeling that the song would have been "perfect for her."

== Composition ==
"After the Glitter Fades" is performed in the key of A major, with Nicks' vocals ranging from E4–G#5.

== Reception ==
Cash Box called it "a plaintive rock lament" that "captures that unique Nicks magic."

== Charts ==
"After the Glitter Fades" was released April 30, 1982 and peaked at No. 32 on the Billboard Hot 100 and reached number 36 on the Billboard Adult Contemporary chart. The song also peaked at number 70 on the Hot Country Singles chart, becoming Nicks' only entry to date on that chart.

Weekly chart performance for "After the Glitter Fades"
Chart (1982)	Peak position
US Billboard Hot 100	32
US Adult Contemporary (Billboard)	36
US Hot Country Songs (Billboard)	70
US Cash Box Top 100	31

== Cover versions ==
- The song was covered by American singer Glen Campbell on his album Letter to Home in 1984.
