= The Dealer (song) =

Single by Stevie Nicks

from the album 24 Karat Gold: Songs from the Vault
- Released: August 5, 2014
- Recorded: April–May 2014
- Genre: Pop rock, soft rock
- Length: 4:38
- Label: Warner Brothers
- Songwriter: Stevie Nicks
- Producers: Stevie Nicks, Dave Stewart, Waddy Wachtel

Stevie Nicks singles chronology
| "For What It's Worth" (2011) | "The Dealer" (2014) | "Lady" (2014) |

"The Dealer" is a 2014 song by the American singer/songwriter Stevie Nicks. It was the first single from her solo album, 24 Karat Gold: Songs from the Vault. The song was a minor hit in Belgium, where it peaked at No. 72 on the Wallonia Tip chart.

== Background ==
The song was written in 1979 for Fleetwood Mac's "Tusk" album but it was left unreleased. It was presented to engineer Hernán Rojas around the time Fleetwood Mac was recording the demo for "Sara", but was not recorded by the full band until several months later. The other members of Fleetwood Mac, particularly Lindsey Buckingham, were lukewarm about the song in spent comparatively less time working on the song compared to other material on the Tusk album.

For the recording sessions, John McVie's bass guitar was sent directly to the mixing console, Mick Fleetwood was on drums, Buckingham played an electric guitar through a Mesa/Boogie, Christine McVie used her Yamaha electric piano, and Nicks was situated in an isolation booth with an additional keyboard to help with chord changes. Rojas commented that the chord progression was more advanced than what Nicks was used to writing and that her lack of conventional music training prevented her from providing the band proper guidance on how to approach the song. He further reckoned that the song could have been huge hit for Tusk if enough attention was given to it. The song was attempted again for Nicks's Bella Donna album in 1981, although these efforts were also unsuccessful.

A bootleg recording of the song was found on YouTube by Nicks' manager, which inspired Nicks to re-record the song. The song's release was accompanied by a lyric video.

== Charts ==
| Chart (2014) | Peak position |
|---|---|
| Belgium (Ultratip Bubbling Under Wallonia) | 72 |
