= The Other Side of the Mirror (album) =

Studio album by Stevie Nicks
- Released: May 30, 1989
- Recorded: 1988
- Studios: Farmyard, Buckinghamshire, UK; Lion Share, Los Angeles; The Castle, Los Angeles; Soundcastle, Hollywood; Ground Control, Hollywood; Smoketree Ranch, Chatsworth; Hit Factory, New York City
- Genres: Rock; soft rock
- Length: 56:10
- Label: Modern
- Producer: Rupert Hine

Stevie Nicks chronology
Rock a Little (1985)	The Other Side of the Mirror (1989)	Timespace: The Best of Stevie Nicks (1991)

Singles from The Other Side of the Mirror
- 1. "Rooms on Fire" Released: April 24, 1989; 2. "Two Kinds of Love" Released: June 1989; 3. "Long Way to Go" Released: July 31, 1989; 4. "Whole Lotta Trouble" Released: October 30, 1989

The Other Side of the Mirror is the fourth solo studio album by American singer and songwriter Stevie Nicks. Released on May 30, 1989, through the Modern Records label, the album was recorded in California, New York, and Buckinghamshire in England, and is loosely based around the theme of Lewis Carroll's novel Alice's Adventures in Wonderland (1865).

The album was a commercial success. It reached No. 10 on the US Billboard 200, propelled by the hit single "Rooms on Fire" (US No. 16), and achieved Platinum status for selling in excess of one million copies. The album reached No. 3 in the United Kingdom and was certified Gold there for sales in excess of 100,000. The Other Side of the Mirror is Nicks's highest-charting album to date in various European countries including Germany, the Netherlands, Sweden, and the United Kingdom.

== Background ==
Following the huge success of Fleetwood Mac's album Tango in the Night (1987) in the United Kingdom, The Other Side of the Mirror became Nicks's highest-charting solo album there, reaching No. 3 and spawning her first UK Top 40 hit with "Rooms on Fire" (reaching No. 16), which Nicks performed on the BBC show Top of the Pops. The album was certified gold in the United Kingdom for sales in excess of 100,000 copies. Her first solo tour of the United Kingdom and Europe (including Sweden, France and the Netherlands), followed the album. There was also a US tour, though Nicks has since commented that she has no recollection of the tours due to her increasing dependency on the prescribed tranquilizer Klonopin at that time.

In the United States, "Two Kinds of Love" was released as a single, featuring vocals by Bruce Hornsby and an instrumental interlude by Kenny G, which became Nicks's first single to fail to chart, missing both the Billboard and Cash Box charts, although it did peak at number 35 on the Gavin Report adult contemporary chart. However, "Long Way to Go" gained substantial airplay, making Billboard's Mainstream Rock chart, and it also made the Top 75 on the UK Singles Chart, as did "Whole Lotta Trouble". Promotional music videos were shot for "Rooms on Fire" and "Whole Lotta Trouble". The former was released with two slightly different edits, while the "Whole Lotta Trouble" video was shot during the American leg of Nicks's tour at the Summit Arena in Houston, Texas.

An earlier, instrumental version of the song "Juliet" (titled "Book of Miracles") was released by Fleetwood Mac in 1987 as the B-side to "Seven Wonders", while “Ooh My Love” was demoed for Tango in the Night but was ultimately shelved. The song "Cry Wolf" was originally recorded by American singer Laura Branigan for her fifth studio album Touch (1987).

Modern Records also released a special long-form interview video on the making of the album, titled "Reflections from the Other Side of the Mirror", which contained newly filmed material shot by Herbert Worthington III. However, it was limited to a worldwide release of 10,000 albums and only 500 VHS releases.

== Critical reception ==
Professional ratings
Review scores
Source	Rating
Allmusic	3/5 stars
Chicago Tribune	2/4 stars
Deseret News	(Positive)
Hi-Fi News & Record Review	A:2
Los Angeles Times	2.5/5 stars
People	(Mixed)
Record Mirror	4.5/5 stars
Rolling Stone	2/5 stars

Duncan Holland, reviewer of British music newspaper Music Week, praised the album. He wrote: "This is a remarkably strong record from the single, "Rooms on Fire", to the 11 other tracks on show. Some rather overworked "Alice in Wonderland" imagery aside, this is excellent stuff, floating, melodic, twisting and turning." Pete Clark of Hi-Fi News & Record Review also found some warm words. He considered that this work is destined "for those evenings when you just have to leave your brain at the door, there are worse things that can ooze into your ears."

== Track listing ==
The Other Side of the Mirror track listing
No.	Title	Writer(s)	Length
1.	"Rooms on Fire"	Stevie Nicks; Rick Nowels	4:35
2.	"Long Way to Go"	Nicks; Nowels; Charles Judge	4:06
3.	"Two Kinds of Love" (with Bruce Hornsby)	Nicks; Rupert Hine; Nowels	4:46
4.	"Ooh My Love"	Nicks; Nowels	5:02
5.	"Ghosts"	Nicks; Mike Campbell	4:54
6.	"Whole Lotta Trouble"	Nicks; Campbell	4:58
7.	"Fire Burning"	Nicks; Campbell; Hine	3:16
8.	"Cry Wolf"	Jude Johnstone	4:12
9.	"Alice"	Nicks; Hine	5:50
10.	"Juliet"	Nicks	4:55
11.	"Doing the Best That I Can (Escape from Berlin)"	Nicks	5:36
12.	"I Still Miss Someone (Blue Eyes)"	Johnny Cash; Roy Cash Jr.	4:08
Total length:			56:06

== Personnel ==
Musicians

- Stevie Nicks – vocals, percussion (1, 6), tambourine (2, 4, 5, 7, 10)
- Rupert Hine – keyboards, percussion (1, 3, 4, 6), drum programming (3, 9, 11, 12), synth bass (9), bass (12)
- Rick Nowels – guitars (1, 2, 4), acoustic guitar (1)
- Jamie West-Oram – guitars (1–4, 6, 8, 9, 11)
- Waddy Wachtel – acoustic guitar (3, 7, 9, 12), guitars (6, 7, 10)
- Mike Campbell – guitars (5, 6, 7), slide acoustic guitar (6, 10)
- Vail Johnson – bass (1, 4, 5, 7, 10)
- Tony Levin – stick bass (2, 6, 11), bass (3, 8, 12)
- Derek Murphy – bass (7)
- Geoff Dugmore – drums (1, 8), keyboards (8)
- Jerry Marotta – drums (2, 4–7, 10)
- Kenny G – soprano saxophone (3), tenor saxophone (9)
- Marc Russo – saxophones (6)
- Larry Williams – saxophones (6)
- Gary Grant – trumpet (6)
- Jerry Hey – trumpet (6)
- The L.A. Horns – additional brass (6)
- Kelly Johnston – tin whistle (12)
- Sharon Celani – backing vocals (1, 2, 3, 5–12)
- Lori Perry-Nicks – backing vocals
- Bruce Hornsby – vocals (3), acoustic piano (10), additional vocals (10), backing vocals (10)

Production

- Rupert Hine – producer, arrangements
- Stephen W. Tayler – recording, mixing
- Tim Leitner – engineer
- Jimmy Hoyson – assistant engineer
- Lance Krive – assistant engineer
- Paul Loeves – assistant engineer
- Derek Murphy – assistant engineer, mix assistant
- Ray Pyle – assistant engineer
- Bob Salcedo – assistant engineer
- Arun Chakraverty – mastering
- Herbert Worthington III – art direction, photography
- DNZ, The Design Group – design, layout

Studios

- Recorded at Farmyard Studios (Buckinghamshire, England); Lion Share Recording Studios and The Castle Studios (Los Angeles, California); Soundcastle and Ground Control Studios (Hollywood, California); Smoketree Ranch (Chatsworth, California); The Hit Factory (New York City, New York).
- Mixed at Farmyard Studios
- Mastered at Master Room (London, UK).

== Charts ==
=== Weekly charts ===
Weekly chart performance for The Other Side of the Mirror
Chart (1989)	Peak position
Australian Albums (ARIA)	8
Canada Top Albums/CDs (RPM)	11
Dutch Albums (Album Top 100)	24
European Albums (Music & Media)	17
German Albums (Offizielle Top 100)	14
New Zealand Albums (RMNZ)	14
Swedish Albums (Sverigetopplistan)	8
Swiss Albums (Schweizer Hitparade)	79
UK Albums (Official Charts)	3
US Billboard 200	10
US Cash Box Top 200 Albums	12

=== Year-end charts ===
Year-end chart performance for The Other Side of the Mirror
Chart (1989)	Position
Australian Albums (ARIA)	47
Canada Top Albums/CDs (RPM)	49
European Albums (Music & Media)	94
German Albums (Offizielle Top 100)	74
UK Albums (OCC)	93
US Billboard 200	85
US Cash Box Top 200 Albums	49

== Certifications and sales ==
Certifications and sales for The Other Side of the Mirror
Region	Certification	Certified units/sales
Australia	—	100,000
United Kingdom (BPI)	Gold	100,000^{^}
United States (RIAA)	Platinum	1,000,000^{^}
^{^} Shipments figures based on certification alone.

== Releases and promotions ==
- The UK 12-inch and CD single releases of "Rooms on Fire" feature an extended version of the song running at 9:00, and also includes a live version of "Has Anyone Ever Written Anything for You?" recorded during the Rock a Little tour as featured in the video/DVD release of the Red Rocks concert in 1986. A limited edition of the UK 12-inch also came with a glossy, full-size, double-sided poster.
- The single release of "Long Way to Go" ("Two Kinds of Love" in the United States) features the non-album track "Real Tears", while the UK 12" and CD single releases feature an extended remix of "Long Way to Go", running at 6:23 (and not 7:37 as stated on the label). The UK 12-inch release of "Long Way to Go" was also available in a limited edition gatefold sleeve.
- The UK CD-single release of "Whole Lotta Trouble" features a live version of "Beauty and the Beast", recorded during the Rock a Little tour as featured in the video release of Live at Red Rocks. A limited edition of the UK 12-inch release also came with a glossy, full-size, double-sided poster.
- The Japanese CD release of the album includes the bonus track "Has Anyone Ever Written Anything for You?" recorded live during the Rock a Little tour.
- As a promotional giveaway in the United Kingdom, the album was released with a limited edition holographic sticker (the size of the sticker was dependent upon the format; vinyl album, cassette, CD). Album buyers were also given the opportunity to purchase a special display stand for the sticker by mail order.

== Tour ==
Setlist:

- "Outside the Rain"
- "Dreams"
- "Rooms on Fire"
- "Gold Dust Woman"
- "Stand Back"
- "Alice"
- "No Spoken Word"
- "How Still My Love"
- "Beauty and the Beast"
- "Juliet" (performed at some shows)
- "Talk to Me" (performed at some shows)
- "Whole Lotta Trouble"
- "Two Kinds of Love"
- "Edge of Seventeen"
- "Has Anyone Ever Written Anything for You?"
