= Leather and Lace (song) =

1981 single by Stevie Nicks and Don Henley

Single by Stevie Nicks and Don Henley

from the album Bella Donna
- B-side: "Bella Donna" "Outside the Rain" (UK)
- Released: October 6, 1981
- Recorded: 1980
- Genre: Folk rock
- Length: 3:44
- Label: Modern
- Songwriter: Stevie Nicks
- Producer: Jimmy Iovine

Stevie Nicks singles chronology
"Stop Draggin' My Heart Around" (1981)	"Leather and Lace" (1981)	"Edge of Seventeen" (1982)

Don Henley singles chronology
"Leather and Lace" (1981)	"Johnny Can't Read" (1982)

"Leather and Lace" is a song performed by American singers Stevie Nicks and Don Henley. It was released on October 6, 1981, as the second single from Nicks' solo debut studio album Bella Donna (1981).

Nicks and the Eagles' singer Henley were romantically involved from 1977 until 1978. Nicks wrote the song for Waylon Jennings and Jessi Colter's duet album Leather and Lace, but the song was not included. Jennings still intended to use the song for his solo work, while Nicks became attached to the idea of the song as a duet. Nicks recorded the song as a duet with Henley for her Bella Donna album. Jimmy Iovine served as the producer.

The song compares the male singer's rougher life, represented by leather, to the female singer's softer life, represented by lace, and how opposites can attract.

== Release and reception ==
According to Radio & Records, 60 percent of US contemporary hit radio stations had included the song on their playlists by the week of October 23, 1981. The song later went on to peak at number six on the US Billboard Hot 100 for three weeks in January 1982.

Stephen Holden of Rolling Stone characterized the song as a "sweet Nicks-Henley duet."Record World called the song a "magical ballad" and described Henley's vocals as "warm".

== Personnel ==
- Stevie Nicks – lead and backing vocals
- Don Henley – co-lead vocals
- Waddy Wachtel – guitar
- Roy Bittan – piano
- Russ Kunkel – drums

== Charts ==
=== Weekly charts ===
Chart (1981–1982)	Peak position
Australia (Kent Music Report)	68
Canada Top Singles (RPM)	12
Canada Adult Contemporary (RPM)	7
New Zealand (Recorded Music NZ)	50
US Billboard Hot 100	6
US Cashbox Top 100	9
US Adult Contemporary (Billboard)	10
US Album Rock Tracks (Billboard)	26

=== Year-end charts ===
Year-end chart (1982)	Rank
US Top Pop Singles (Billboard)	36

== Certifications ==
Region	Certification	Certified units/sales
Canada (Music Canada)	Platinum	80,000^{‡}
New Zealand (RMNZ)	Gold	15,000^{‡}
^{‡} Sales+streaming figures based on certification alone.

== Jeffery Austin and Gwen Stefani remake ==
"Leather and Lace"

Song by Jeffery Austin and Gwen Stefani

from the album The Complete Season 9 Collection
- Released: December 14, 2015
- Recorded: 2015
- Length: 3:20
- Label: Republic
- Songwriter: Stevie Nicks
- Producer: Jimmy Iovine

Jeffery Austin and Gwen Stefani performed a cover of the song on December 14, 2015, for the season nine finale of The Voice. It was released for digital download simultaneously with the episode's airing.

=== Charts ===
Chart performance for "Leather and Lace"
Chart (2015)	Peak position
US Pop Digital Song Sales (Billboard)	31
