= 24 Karat Gold: Songs from the Vault =

24 Karat Gold - Songs from the Vault

Studio album by Stevie Nicks
- Released: September 30, 2014
- Recorded: April 20–May 5, 2014
- Genre: Rock
- Length: 63:51 (standard); 72:29 (deluxe)
- Label: Reprise
- Producers: Stevie Nicks; Dave Stewart; Waddy Wachtel

Stevie Nicks chronology
In Your Dreams (2011)	24 Karat Gold - Songs from the Vault (2014)	Stand Back (2019)

Singles from 24 Karat Gold: Songs from the Vault
- 1. "The Dealer" Released: August 5, 2014; 2. "Lady" Released: August 25, 2014; 3. "Starshine" Released: September 16, 2014; 4. "24 Karat Gold" Released: September 23, 2014

24 Karat Gold: Songs from the Vault is the eighth solo studio album by the American singer-songwriter and Fleetwood Mac vocalist Stevie Nicks, released on September 30, 2014, through Reprise Records.

== Background ==
Recorded in Nashville and Los Angeles, the album includes new versions of demos that Nicks primarily recorded between 1969 and 1987, though two songs date back to 1994 and 1995. There is one cover on the album, "Carousel", a song originally written and performed by Vanessa Carlton on her album Rabbits on the Run (2011). Nicks put it on the album because it was her mother's favorite song in her last days and Carlton was present during her death. Nicks was inspired to record the album after her assistant showed her bootlegs on YouTube of the demos Nicks had recorded over the years. Included on the album is "Blue Water", a song that features the band Lady Antebellum on vocals.

The album sold 33,000 copies in its first week of release and debuted at #7 on the Billboard 200, giving Nicks her sixth top ten album on that chart.

== Release ==
=== Album ===
The album was released as standard and deluxe editions. The standard edition contains 14 tracks and features several previously unpublished polaroid photos of Nicks throughout her career. The limited quantity deluxe edition features a different track list order with two bonus tracks ("Twisted" and "Watch Chain") in addition to a full color 48-page photo book of never-before-released photos. The set was also released on vinyl with the deluxe edition track listing on two 125-gram LPs housed in a gatefold package.

=== Singles ===
The album was supported by three singles. Additionally, several promotional singles were made available for download from the album prior to its release. "The Dealer", was released on August 5, 2014, followed by "Lady" on August 25, "Starshine", on September 16, and the title track on September 23, 2014.

== Critical reception ==
Professional ratings
Aggregate scores
Source	Rating
Metacritic	73/100
Review scores
Source	Rating
AllMusic	4.5/5 stars
Classic Rock	8/10 stars
Los Angeles Times	3.5/4 stars
Mojo	3/5 stars
New York Daily News	3/5 stars
Slant Magazine	3/5 stars

24 Karat Gold: Songs from the Vault received mostly positive reviews from music critics upon its release. At Metacritic, the album has received a Metascore of 73 out of 100 based on 11 reviews, indicating "generally favorable reviews".

Stephen Thomas Erlewine of AllMusic rated the album four and a half stars out of five and calls it "the best-sounding record she's made since 1983's The Wild Heart." Writing for New York Daily News, Jim Farber gave the album three stars out of five and states: "We get pure Stevie — needier than some might find comfortable, but also unexpectedly wise. It's too much for the casual listener but catnip for the devoted."

== Commercial performance ==
The album debuted on the Billboard 200 at #7 with sales of 33,000 giving Nicks her sixth top 10 album. The album also debuted on the UK Albums chart at #14 with sales of 5,508, giving Nicks her fifth UK Top 20 album.

Nicks made various TV appearances to promote the album, including the Tonight Show with Jimmy Fallon where she performed "Lady".

== Track listing ==
No.	Title	Writer(s)	Length
1.	"Starshine"	Stevie Nicks	4:05
2.	"The Dealer"	Stevie Nicks	4:38
3.	"Mabel Normand"	Stevie Nicks	4:53
4.	"Blue Water" (featuring Lady Antebellum)	Stevie Nicks	4:26
5.	"Cathouse Blues"	Stevie Nicks	2:48
6.	"24 Karat Gold"	Stevie Nicks	4:09
7.	"Hard Advice"	Stevie Nicks	4:20
8.	"Lady"	Stevie Nicks	4:58
9.	"I Don't Care"	Stevie Nicks, Mike Campbell, Waddy Wachtel	6:09
10.	"All the Beautiful Worlds"	Stevie Nicks	5:00
11.	"Belle Fleur"	Stevie Nicks	5:37
12.	"If You Were My Love"	Stevie Nicks	5:00
13.	"Carousel"	Vanessa Carlton	3:19
14.	"She Loves Him Still"	Stevie Nicks, Mark Knopfler	4:29
Total length:			63:51

Deluxe Edition
No.	Title	Writer(s)	Length
1.	"Starshine"		4:05
2.	"If You Were My Love"		5:00
3.	"Mabel Normand"		4:53
4.	"Twisted"		4:28
5.	"24 Karat Gold"		4:09
6.	"Belle Fleur"		5:37
7.	"All the Beautiful Worlds"		5:01
8.	"Lady"	Stevie Nicks	4:58
9.	"I Don't Care"	Stevie Nicks	6:09
10.	"Watch Chain"	Stevie Nicks	4:09
11.	"Hard Advice"		4:20
12.	"Carousel"		3:19
13.	"Blue Water" (featuring Lady Antebellum)		4:26
14.	"Cathouse Blues"		2:48
15.	"The Dealer"		4:38
16.	"She Loves Him Still"		4:29
Total length:			72:29

== Personnel ==
Main Performers

- Stevie Nicks – vocals, keyboards
- Vanessa Carlton – backing vocals on "Carousel"
- Sharon Celani – backing vocals
- Lady A (Hillary Scott, Charles Kelley, Dave Haywood) – backing vocals on "Blue Water"
- Jessica Nicks – backing vocals on "Carousel"
- Lori Nicks – backing vocals
- David A. Stewart – guitar
- Waddy Wachtel – guitar, backing vocals

Session Musicians

- Mike Campbell – guitar on "Starshine" and "I Don't Care"
- Davey Johnstone – guitar on "Belle Fleur" and "If You Were My Love"
- Ann Marie Calhoun – violin on "Carousel"
- Tom Bukovac – guitar
- Michael Rhodes – bass
- Kieran Kiely – accordion, ethnic flutes / whistles
- Dan Dugmore – banjo
- Chad Cromwell – drums
- Benmont Tench – keyboards, piano
- Lenny Castro – percussion

== Charts ==
=== Weekly charts ===
Chart (2014)	Peak position
Australian Albums (ARIA)	16
Belgian Albums (Ultratop Flanders)	116
Belgian Albums (Ultratop Wallonia)	197
German Albums (Offizielle Top 100)	69
Irish Albums (IRMA)	15
New Zealand Albums (RMNZ)	40
Scottish Albums (Official Charts)	12
UK Albums (Official Charts)	14
US Billboard 200	7
US Top Rock Albums (Billboard)	3
US Indie Store Album Sales (Billboard)	6
US Vinyl Albums (Billboard)	5

=== Year-end charts ===
Chart (2014)	Position
US Top Rock Albums (Billboard)	67

== Release history ==
Region	Date	Format(s)	Edition(s)	Label	Ref
United Kingdom	September 30, 2014	Digital download	Deluxe	Reprise; Warner Bros.	
United States	September 30, 2014	Digital download	Standard; deluxe	Reprise; Warner Bros.	
United Kingdom	October 6, 2014	CD	Standard	Reprise; Warner Bros.	
United States	October 7, 2014	CD	Standard; deluxe	Reprise; Warner Bros.	
