= I Can't Wait (Stevie Nicks song) =

- US single cover (12-inch cover pictured)

Single by Stevie Nicks

from the album Rock a Little
- B-side: "Rock a Little (Go Ahead Lily)"; "The Nightmare"
- Released: October 28, 1985
- Recorded: 1985
- Studio: The Village (West Los Angeles, California)
- Genre: Electronic rock; dance-rock
- Length: 4:37 (album version); 4:01 (7-inch soft intro); 5:57 (12-inch rock mix); 6:20 (12-inch dance mix)
- Label: Modern
- Songwriters: Stevie Nicks; Rick Nowels; Eric Pressly
- Producers: Jimmy Iovine; Rick Nowels

Stevie Nicks singles chronology
"Talk to Me" (1985)	"I Can't Wait" (1985)	"Has Anyone Ever Written Anything for You?" (1986)

Alternative cover
- International single cover

Music video
- "I Can't Wait" on YouTube

"I Can't Wait" is a 1985 song by American singer-songwriter Stevie Nicks, from her third solo studio album, Rock a Little. Written by Nicks, Rick Nowels, and Eric Pressly, the song was released on October 28, 1985, as the album's lead single in Australia, and in January 1986 in the United Kingdom and Ireland. In the United States, it was released in February 1986 as the second single after "Talk to Me".

The single was a Top 20 hit in Australia and the United States. In the United Kingdom, "I Can't Wait" peaked at no. 54 and became Nicks' first singles chart entry since 1981, and only the second single of her solo career to chart there. A 1991 re-release peaked slightly higher at no. 47 in the UK. The music video, directed by Marty Callner, featured appearances from Nicks' brother, back-up singers Sharon Celani and Lori Perry, and Mick Fleetwood.

== Background ==
"I Can't Wait" was recorded in 1985 at The Village studio in West Los Angeles and was written by Nicks, Rick Nowels, and Eric Pressly. The song was produced by Nowels and Jimmy Iovine, who had worked with Nicks since her 1981 Bella Donna album but later left the Rock a Little project.

Nicks explained the song in depth in the liner notes of her 1991 compilation album Timespace: The Best of Stevie Nicks:

"To understand this song, you sort of have to let yourself go a little crazy. Love is blind, it never works out, but you just have to have it. I think this was about the most exciting song that I had ever heard. My friend, Rick, whom I had known since I was 18 and he was 13, brought over this track with this incredible percussion thing, and gave it to me asking me if I would listen to it and consider writing a song for it. I listened to the song once, and pretended not to be that knocked out, but the second Rick left, I ran in my little recording studio and wrote 'I Can't Wait.' It took all night, and I think it is all about how electric I felt about this music. And that night, that SATURDAY night, Rick and I went into a BIG studio and recorded it. I sang it only once, and have never sung it since in the studio. Some vocals are magic and simply not able to beat. So I let go of it, as new to me as it was; but you know, now when I hear it on the radio, this incredible feeling comes over me, like something really incredible is about to happen."

== Critical reception ==
Cash Box reviewed "I Can't Wait" favorably, describing it as "a rolling pop/rocker [...] with a slicing guitar and high-tech production." Billboard wrote that the song had a "crowded production" with "pumping bass" that underpinned Nicks' "theatrical style". Dave Sholin from The Gavin Report praised the hook as one of her best. Reviewing the song for Sounds magazine, Andy Hurt wrote "let sleeping dogs lie."

== Chart performance ==
"I Can't Wait" first charted in Australia, debuting on the Kent Music Report chart on 13 January 1986, peaking at No. 20 in February. The single first entered the UK Singles Chart for week ending 25 January 1986, peaking at No. 54 the following week; Nicks' first single to chart in the UK since "Stop Draggin' My Heart Around" in 1981. "I Can't Wait" spent a week on the Irish Singles Chart peaking at No. 29 on 23 January 1986. In New Zealand, the single entered the chart on 16 February 1986, peaking at No. 39 the following week.

In the United States, the single was the second most added song to contemporary hit radio stations reporting to Billboard during the week ending February 22, 1986. It peaked inside the top 20, peaking at No. 16 for two weeks on the Billboard Hot 100 in April 1986 and is one of only four of Nicks' singles to enter the Dance Club Songs chart, peaking inside the top 30. In West Germany, "I Can't Wait" entered the chart in early May 1986, peaking at No. 58 two weeks later.

The single's American chart run coincided with that of a Nu Shooz song also titled "I Can't Wait".

The song was re-issued as a single in the UK and Europe in October 1991, to promote the Timespace: The Best of Stevie Nicks compilation album. The single peaked marginally higher in the UK on this release, at No. 47 in November 1991.

== Music video ==
The music video for "I Can't Wait" was directed by Marty Callner and produced by Rabia Dockroy of Cream Cheese Productions. The music video features Nicks, her brother Christopher, Sharon Celani, and Lori Perry-Nicks (Nicks’ longtime back-up singers), choreographer Brad Jeffries and a cameo by Mick Fleetwood.

Nicks performs part of the song by herself in a small room which could be a interpreted as a prison cell. Nicks is primarily dressed in black and sings the song in front of a microphone.

An earlier, alternative edit of the music video aired in Australia, due to the single's earlier release there.

== Live performances ==
"I Can't Wait" was performed for the first time on the Rock a Little tour in 1986 and this was the only tour to feature the song.

== Official releases ==
An extended mix of "I Can't Wait" was released towards the end of 1985 in most territories such as the United States, the United Kingdom and Germany. The extended mix also included the standard version of the song and the Rock a Little album track "Rock a Little (Go Ahead Lily)". The 7" single release simply featured the standard version and "Rock a Little (Go Ahead Lily)". A 1986 release in the US featured an extended mix of the album track "The Nightmare".

The 5-track U.S. 12" release of "I Can't Wait" includes:

Side A

1. "I Can't Wait" (Rock Mix) — 5:57
2. "I Can't Wait" (Dance Mix) — 6:20

Side B

1. "The Nightmare" (Special Extended Vocal Remix) — 6:38
2. "I Can't Wait" (Dub Dance Mix) — 4:23
3. "I Can't Wait" (Dub Rock Mix) — 5:46

Rock Mix by Chris Lord-Alge, Dub Rock Mix by Steve Thompson, Dance Mix and Dub Dance Mix by Michael Barbiero

The song appears on the aforementioned 1991 Timespace album as well as the 2007 greatest hits album Crystal Visions – The Very Best of Stevie Nicks. The song was re-released in 1991 in the certain countries, and this release is listed as the "TimeSpace version".

== Personnel ==
- Stevie Nicks – vocals
- Rick Nowels – E-mu Emulator II, Oberheim OB-8, Prophet-5, backing vocals
- Jamie Sheriff – PPG Wave
- Michael Landau – guitars
- George Black – guitars and bass
- Sharon Celani, Marilyn Martin, Maria Vidal – backing vocals

== Charts ==
=== Weekly charts ===
1986 weekly chart performance for "I Can't Wait"
Chart (1986)	Peak position
Australia (Kent Music Report)	20
Canada Top Singles (RPM)	43
Ireland (IRMA)	29
New Zealand (Recorded Music NZ)	39
UK Singles (Official Charts)	54
US Billboard Hot 100	16
US Dance Club Songs (Billboard)	26
US Mainstream Rock (Billboard)	6
US Cash Box Top 100	13
US Top 40 (Gavin Report)	10
US AOR Tracks (Radio & Records)	6
US Contemporary Hit Radio (Radio & Records)	12
West Germany (GfK)	58

1991–2 weekly chart performance for "I Can't Wait"
Chart (1991–92)	Peak position
Australia (ARIA)	182
Luxembourg (Radio Luxembourg)	9
UK Singles (OCC)	47

=== Year-end charts ===
1986 year-end chart performance for "I Can't Wait"
Chart (1986)	Position
US AOR Tracks (Radio & Records)	54
