= Talk to Me (Stevie Nicks song) =

Single by Stevie Nicks

from the album Rock a Little
- B-side: "One More Big Time Rock and Roll Star"
- Released: October 28, 1985
- Recorded: 1985
- Genre: Pop rock
- Length: 4:10
- Label: Modern
- Songwriter: Chas Sandford
- Producers: Chas Sandford; Jimmy Iovine

Stevie Nicks singles chronology
"Nightbird" (1983)	"Talk to Me" (1985)	"I Can't Wait" (1986)

"Talk to Me" is a song recorded by American singer-songwriter Stevie Nicks for her third solo studio album Rock a Little (1985). Written by Chas Sandford, the song was released as the lead single from the album on October 28, 1985, through Modern Records. The single became a big hit for Nicks, peaking at number four on the Billboard Hot 100 chart for two weeks and peaking at number one on the Billboard Top Mainstream Rock Songs chart for two weeks in 1985.

== Background and composition ==
The song was written by Chas Sandford, who co-wrote John Waite's 1984 hit "Missing You". Sandford also plays most of the instruments on "Talk to Me". The song was brought to Nicks' attention by producer Jimmy Iovine, "who was always on the hunt for a hit song." Nicks said she didn't like the song at first because she had trouble with the vocals, but Iovine persisted and she eventually recorded it. Jim Keltner was in the studio next door doing some drum overdubs during the recording process. After Nicks explained her dilemma, Keltner gave her some words of encouragement and offered to stay with her and be her audience. Nicks sang the song twice during the session and then it was finished.

== Reception ==
Cash Box called it "a mid-tempo rocker which makes good uses of Nicks’ throaty lead and harmony vocals." Billboard said that it "packs a real wallop."

== Music video ==
The promotional music video shows Nicks performing the song direct to camera in a variety of different sets in what looks like a grand house. One of the sets is a long white room that looks like an art gallery and has three steps in the middle which Nicks, her backing singers Sharon Celani and Lori Perry, and two male dancers, perform choreographed dance steps together. Nicks' brother, Christopher, features in the video playing the saxophone.

== Live performances ==
"Talk to Me" made its live debut on the Rock a Little world tour in 1986. It was also included on the Canadian leg of The Other Side of the Mirror tour set in 1989. Nicks also performed on the 1991 "Whole Lotta Trouble Tour" to promote her greatest hits album Timespace: The Best of Stevie Nicks. The last time it was played live was on the Street Angel Tour in 1994.

== Single release formats ==
"Talk to Me" was released as a 7-inch vinyl in many territories in the picture sleeve featured above, with "One More Big Time Rock and Roll Star" as its non-album B-side. Promo 7-inch singles with picture sleeve were also released in some countries, including the U.S., and featured the title track on both sides of the disc.

Picture sleeves varied country by country in its European 7" release, with Spain and Germany using sleeves which featured the artist name and title but no photograph, and the UK used a picture sleeve which featured the black-and-white photograph of Nicks which was used for the back cover of the Rock a Little LP sleeve. The single peaked at number 68 in the UK.

A 3-track 12" single was issued in the UK and Germany (but with differing picture sleeves), featuring the album version of the title track and "One More Big Time Rock and Roll Star" and "Imperial Hotel" as the B-sides.

A 12-inch promo was released in the U.S. featuring a full-color glossy picture sleeve and additional inner sleeve, and the disc featured the title track in mono and stereo.

== Other versions ==
- Nicks re-recorded the song in 1986 for inclusion on the Time-Life compilation It's Only Rock and Roll.
- The rock band Lovedrug included a live recording of "Talk to Me" on the fan-chosen covers album from the I AM LOVEDRUG campaign. The album, titled Best of I AM LOVEDRUG, was released on June 28, 2011.

== Personnel ==
- Stevie Nicks – lead vocals
- Sharon Celani – backing vocals
- Lori Perry-Nicks – backing vocals
- Chas Sandford – Ensoniq Mirage, electric guitar, 6-string and 12-string guitars, bass guitar, drum machine
- Greg Phillinganes – timpani
- Barney Wilen – saxophone

== Charts ==
Weekly chart performance for "Talk to Me"
Chart (1985–1986)	Peak position
Australia (Kent Music Report)	22
Canada (The Record)	14
Canada Top Singles (RPM)	10
Canada Adult Contemporary (RPM)	15
European Hot 100 Singles (Music & Media)	89
UK Singles (Official Charts)	68
US Billboard Hot 100	4
US Adult Contemporary (Billboard)	14
US Mainstream Rock (Billboard)	1
US Adult Contemporary (Radio & Records)	9
US AOR Tracks (Radio & Records)	1
US Contemporary Hit Radio (Radio & Records)	3
West Germany (GfK)	28

Year-end chart performance for "Talk to Me'
Year-end chart (1986)	Position
US Top Pop Singles (Billboard)	57
US Adult Contemporary (Radio & Records)	81
US Contemporary Hit Radio (Radio & Records)	56

== Appearances in other media ==
- The song was recorded by Diva Destruction for Todd Stephens' 2001 film Gypsy 83, about a Stevie Nicks fan who travels across the U.S. to attend the annual "Night of a Thousand Stevies" event.
