= Bella Donna (album) =

1981 studio album by Stevie Nicks

Studio album by Stevie Nicks
- Released: July 27, 1981
- Recorded: Autumn 1980 – Spring 1981
- Studio: Studio 55, Goodnight LA
- Genre: Rock
- Length: 41:48
- Labels: Modern; Atco
- Producers: Jimmy Iovine; Tom Petty

Stevie Nicks chronology
Bella Donna (1981)	The Wild Heart (1983)

Singles from Bella Donna
- 1. "Stop Draggin' My Heart Around" Released: July 8, 1981; 2. "Leather and Lace" Released: October 6, 1981; 3. "Edge of Seventeen" Released: February 5, 1982; 4. "After the Glitter Fades" Released: April 30, 1982

Bella Donna is the debut solo studio album by American singer and songwriter Stevie Nicks. Released on July 27, 1981, the album peaked at number one on the US Billboard 200 in September of that year. Bella Donna was awarded platinum status by the Recording Industry Association of America (RIAA) on October 7, 1981, less than three months after its release, and in 1990 was certified quadruple-platinum for four million copies shipped. Bella Donna spent nearly three years on the Billboard 200, from July 1981 to June 1984.

The album spawned four hit singles during 1981 and 1982: the Tom Petty and the Heartbreakers-penned duet "Stop Draggin' My Heart Around" (number 3), the Don Henley duet "Leather and Lace" (number 6), along with "Edge of Seventeen" (number 11) and the country-tinged "After the Glitter Fades" (number 32).

Bella Donna would mark the beginning of Nicks' trend of calling upon her many musician friends and connections to fully realize her sparse demo recordings. Along with friends Tom Petty and Don Henley, Nicks brought in session musician Waddy Wachtel, Bruce Springsteen's E-Street Band pianist Roy Bittan and Stax session man Donald "Duck" Dunn of Booker T. & the M.G.'s. The album marked the first recording featuring Nicks' backing vocalists, Sharon Celani and Lori Perry, who still record and tour with Nicks today.

The album was also included in the Greatest of All Time Billboard 200 Albums chart.

== History ==
Stevie Nicks began work on Bella Donna in 1979, in between sessions for Fleetwood Mac's Tusk album, released in October that year. Nicks recorded various demo versions of songs in early and mid-1980 but these recordings were not used on the album. Following the end of the Tusk tour on September 1, 1980, work with a full band commenced under producer Jimmy Iovine.

Nicks recalled that the album was recorded piecemeal, since several of the session musicians, including Waddy Wachtel and Russ Kunkel, were operating under a tight schedule. "We didn't put on 50,000 guitars because we didn't have Waddy around long enough to do 50,000 guitar overdubs. We were lucky to get him to do one guitar part." The Bella Donna recording sessions also presented Nicks with an opportunity to work on songs without Lindsey Buckingham, who extensively assisted with the arrangements on her Fleetwood Mac material. For Bella Donna, Nicks instead allowed the session musicians to develop their own ideas for the instrumentation based on the demos she created.

Recording sessions continued until the spring of 1981 when the final songs for the album were completed: "Edge of Seventeen" and "Stop Draggin' My Heart Around", a duet with Tom Petty and the Heartbreakers. The 10-song, 42-minute album Bella Donna was released in the summer of 1981. Nicks wrote "Think About It" for her friend and Fleetwood Mac bandmate Christine McVie during the Rumours recording sessions, but the song was never completed until Bella Donna. "After the Glitter Fades" was Nicks' oldest song on the record, having been written in 1972, while "Think About It", Don Henley duet "Leather and Lace", and "The Highwayman" were written in 1975.

A number of finished songs did not make it on the album, including "Blue Lamp", which was released instead on Heavy Metal soundtrack later in 1981, and "Sleeping Angel", released on the Fast Times at Ridgemont High soundtrack in 1982. These two songs were included on Nicks' Enchanted boxed set in 1998, along with another unused Bella Donna session song, "Gold and Braid". Three more songs from these sessions, "If You Were My Love", "Belle Fleur" and "The Dealer", were finally released on Nicks' album 24 Karat Gold: Songs from the Vault (2014). "Julia" was a song written and recorded by Nicks during the Bella Donna recording process about her close friend Robin Anderson. Stan Lynch, whose playing on "Outside the Rain" made the album, also remembered rehearsing "Gypsy", which would later be recorded by Fleetwood Mac for their 1982 album Mirage. According to Nicks, 16 songs were recorded during the Bella Donna sessions, of which 10 were selected for the album.

== Release ==
Music Week announced that WEA International would handle the distribution of Bella Donna outside the United States and Canada, with the slated release date being July 31, 1981. Merchandising for Bella Donna included a 24" by 30" four-color poster, a 2' by 2' blowup of the album cover, and multicolored die-cut streamers. The album cover shows Nicks in flowing garb with a white bird perched on her hand.

The album debuted at number 12 on the US Billboard 200 for the week dated August 15, 1981. It was the highest debut on the Billboard 200 since Stevie Wonder's Hotter Than July entered the chart at number four in November 1980. In late August, the album ascended to number two, the same week that Mick Fleetwood's The Visitor album reached its peak of number 43. In reaching number two, Bella Donna outperformed the number four chart peak of Fleetwood Mac's 1979 Tusk album. By September, Bella Donna reached number one in the US. One month later, the album received a platinum certification from the Recording Industry Association of America (RIAA). It was certified quadruple-platinum in 1990 for four million copies shipped in the United States.

On her Enchanted boxed set release in 1998, remastered versions of some Bella Donna tracks ran noticeably longer in some instances, notably "Leather and Lace". Video footage of the album sessions can be found on the DVD portion of Nicks' retrospective release Crystal Visions – The Very Best of Stevie Nicks (2007).

Rhino released an expanded, three-disc version of Bella Donna on November 4, 2016. The first disc is the remastered original album. The second disc includes outtakes, alternative versions, demos, and material released on soundtracks. The third disc consists of live tracks from Nicks' White Wing Dove Tour 1981, recorded at the Fox Wilshire Theatre in Los Angeles, California on December 13, 1981.

== Critical reception ==
Professional ratings
Review scores
Source	Rating
AllMusic	4.5/5 stars
Mojo	4/5 stars
Record Collector	3/5 stars
Record Mirror	3/5 stars
Rolling Stone	3/5 stars
The Rolling Stone Album Guide	3.5/5 stars
Smash Hits	6/10

Billboard characterized Bella Donna as "a collection of atmospheric short stories that continue in the tradition of 'Rhiannon' 'Sara' and 'Dreams'". Cashbox referred to Bella Donna as "an enchanting folk rock brew" and a beautifully crafted solo debut." They thought that the best songs on the album were "Edge of Seventeen", "The Highway Man", and "After The Glitter Fades". Record World believed that Bella Donna as a whole had "similar AOR/mass appeal" as its lead single, "Stop Dragging My Heart Around".

Writing for Record Mirror, Mark Cooper characterized the album as a "solid plod of Stevie's pop and rock ballads. She starts out charmingly bland and, by the middle of the second side, splutters to a halt." Record Business thought that Bella Donna was "well up to the standard of her best easy-listening moments from the Rumours LP. Robin Katz of Smash Hits gave Bella Donna a six out of ten and "folk and country strains, woven between Nicks' famed harmonies and the texturized West Coast sound-mix." They ultimately felt that it heavily resembled a Fleetwood Mac album despite the contributions of Tom Petty and Roy Bittan.

Writing for Rolling Stone, Stephen Holden praised the album's "superb arrangements" and highlighted the drumming of Russ Kunkel and guitar playing of Waddy Watchel. While he dismissed certain lyrics as "purple blather", he said that "Nicks' lost-in-the-stars eccentricity has its charms."

In a retrospective review, Alex Henderson of AllMusic considered that Nicks' solo career was "off to an impressive start" and highlighted how the album "yielded a number of hits that seemed omnipresent in the '80s". Henderson also wrote that Jimmy Iovine "wisely" avoided "over-producing" and kept the sound "organic".

== Track listing ==
All tracks are written by Stevie Nicks, except where noted.

Side one
No.	Title	Lyrics	Music	Length
1.	"Bella Donna"			5:18
2.	"Kind of Woman"		Nicks; Benmont Tench	3:08
3.	"Stop Draggin' My Heart Around" (duet with Tom Petty and the Heartbreakers)	Tom Petty; Mike Campbell	Petty; Campbell	4:02
4.	"Think About It"		Nicks; Roy Bittan	3:33
5.	"After the Glitter Fades"			3:27

Side two
No.	Title	Length
1.	"Edge of Seventeen"	5:28
2.	"How Still My Love"	3:51
3.	"Leather and Lace" (duet with Don Henley)	3:55
4.	"Outside the Rain"	4:17
5.	"The Highwayman"	4:49
Total length:		41:48

=== Deluxe edition ===
Released on 4 November 2016, this edition features remastered audio and consists of three discs, divided into: the original album; alternate versions, unreleased tracks, and "rarities"; and a 1981 concert. The information on disc two has been adapted from the Rhino website and the deluxe edition CD's liner notes.

All tracks are written by Stevie Nicks, except where noted.

Disc two: Bonus tracks
No.	Title	Writer(s)	Length
1.	"Edge of Seventeen" (early take)		6:41
2.	"Think About It" (alternate version)	Nicks; Roy Bittan	4:45
3.	"How Still My Love" (alternate version)		4:50
4.	"Leather and Lace" (alternate version)		4:17
5.	"Bella Donna" (demo)		3:31
6.	"Gold and Braid" (unreleased version)	Nicks; Tom Moncrieff	4:14
7.	"Sleeping Angel" (alternate version)		4:43
8.	"If You Were My Love" (unreleased version)		4:54
9.	"The Dealer" (unreleased version)		4:19
10.	"Blue Lamp" (from the Heavy Metal soundtrack)		3:48
11.	"Sleeping Angel" (from the Fast Times at Ridgemont High soundtrack)		4:40
Total length:			50:42

== Personnel ==
Adapted from the album's liner notes.

Musicians

- Stevie Nicks – lead vocals, backing vocals
- Sharon Celani; Lori Perry – backing vocals
- Russ Kunkel – drums (1, 2, 4–8)
- Waddy Wachtel – guitar (1, 2, 4–8)
- Davey Johnstone – acoustic guitar (1, 2, 4, 5, 7, 10)
- Bob Glaub – bass guitar (1, 2, 4–7)
- Bobbye Hall – percussion (1, 2, 4–7)
- Benmont Tench – organ (1–7, 9, 10), piano (9)
- Roy Bittan – piano (2, 5–8)

Additional musicians

- Bill Elliott – piano (1)
- David Adelstein – synthesizer (1)
- Tom Petty – guitar (3, 9), co-lead vocals (3)
- Mike Campbell – guitar (3, 9, 10)
- Donald Dunn – bass guitar (3)
- Stan Lynch – drums (3, 9)
- Phil Jones – percussion (3, 9)
- Billy Payne – piano (4)
- Dan Dugmore – pedal steel guitar (5)
- Don Henley – co-lead vocals (8), backing vocals (10), drums (10)
- Tom Moncrieff – bass guitar (9)
- Don Felder – guitar (10)
- Richard Bowen – bass guitar (10)

Production

- Jimmy Iovine – producer
- Jimmy Iovine; Tom Petty – producers (3, 9)
- Shelly Yakus – engineer, mixing engineer
- Don Smith – mixing engineer, additional engineering
- Thom Panunzio – additional engineering
- Dana Latham; Tori Swenson, Niko Bolas; James Ball – assistant engineers
- Stephen Marcussen – mastering (at Precision Lacquer)
- Gordon Perry – arranger (1)
- Roy Bittan – arranger (7)
- Benmont Tench – musical director
- Janet Weber – production coordinator
- Debbie Alsbury – production assistance, personal assistant
- Cathie Rice – production assistance
- Irving Azoff – management

Artwork

- Herbert W. Worthington III – art direction, photography, design, cover concept
- Stevie Nicks – cover concept
- Christopher Nicks – cover concept
- Mike Manoogian – logo design
- Michael Curtis – layout, design, back cover and inside lighting
- Richard Hall – front cover lighting
- Sabienne Poilievre – front cover hair design
- Beverlee Vance; Richard Bremer; Danton Thompson – hair design
- Margi Kent – clothes
- Liza Gonzales – make-up
- Kathryn Greenbalm – hands

== Charts ==
=== Weekly charts ===
Weekly chart performance for Bella Donna
Chart (1981)	Peak position
Australian Albums (Kent Music Report)	1
Canada Top Albums/CDs (RPM)	2
Dutch Albums (Album Top 100)	20
Italian Albums (Musica e dischi)	23
Japanese Albums (Oricon)	53
New Zealand Albums (RMNZ)	7
Swedish Albums (Sverigetopplistan)	14
UK Albums (Official Charts)	11
US Billboard 200	1
US Rock Albums (Billboard)	3
US Cash Box Top 200 Albums	2

=== Year-end charts ===
1981 year-end chart performance for Bella Donna
Chart (1981)	Position
Australian Albums (Kent Music Report)	17
Canada Top Albums/CDs (RPM)	10
US Cash Box Top 200 Albums	12

1982 year-end chart performance for Bella Donna
Chart (1982)	Position
Canada Top Albums/CDs (RPM)	64
US Billboard 200	8
US Cash Box Top 200 Albums	36

1983 year-end chart performance for Bella Donna
Chart (1983)	Position
US Billboard 200	61

== Certifications and sales ==
Certifications and sales for Bella Donna
Region	Certification	Certified units/sales
Australia	—	100,000
Canada (Music Canada)	2× Platinum	200,000^{^}
New Zealand (RMNZ)	Gold	7,500^{^}
United Kingdom (BPI)	Silver	60,000^{‡}
United States (RIAA)	4× Platinum	4,000,000^{^}
^{^} Shipments figures based on certification alone.

== Tour and HBO television special ==
Nicks underwent a short national tour in support of the album, starting on November 28, 1981, at The Summit in Houston, United States and finishing on December 13 of the same year at the Fox Wilshire Theater in Beverly Hills after ten concerts.

The final concert was recorded by HBO for a television special, and later released on VHS and LaserDisc video in many territories by CBS/Fox in 1982 as White Wing Dove – Stevie Nicks in Concert. The whole show was recorded, but only 9 tracks ("Gold Dust Woman", "Gold and Braid", "I Need to Know", an edited "Outside the Rain", "Dreams", "Stop Draggin' My Heart Around", "Sara", "Edge of Seventeen" and "Rhiannon") were shown on the TV special and released to video. The entirety of the show has circulated as a bootleg.

However, the live performance of "Leather and Lace" was used as a video promo for the single release (even though it was a solo version and did not feature Don Henley), and did surface on the 1986 VHS collection I Can't Wait, which featured six of Nicks' promo-clips between 1981 and 1985. These six promos were released on DVD as a special feature to the Australian issue of Fleetwood Mac – Mirage Tour in 2007.

On the 2016 Bella Donna Deluxe Edition, 14 tracks from the show - the ten aforementioned songs as well as "Angel", "After the Glitter Fades", "Bella Donna" and "How Still My Love" - were remastered and released (Disc 3), with "Outside the Rain" being restored to its full version. Previously, only two tracks ("Edge of Seventeen" and "Gold and Braid") were found on the boxset The Enchanted Works of Stevie Nicks (1998). "Blue Lamp" and "Think About It" were recorded and received audio broadcast on radio but were not televised, and as such have never been officially released.

Nicks' retrospective Crystal Visions – The Very Best of Stevie Nicks (2007) included the full live 1981 clip of "Edge of Seventeen" on the DVD supplement, with optional commentary from Nicks. She admits that her tears at the end of the song were due to her thoughts of having to join Fleetwood Mac in France the following day to begin recording the album Mirage, one of the key reasons why the 1981 tour was so short.

=== Tour set list ===
1. "Gold Dust Woman"
2. "Think About It"
3. "Outside the Rain"
4. "Dreams"
5. "Angel"
6. "After the Glitter Fades"
7. "Gold and Braid"
8. "I Need to Know" (Tom Petty and the Heartbreakers cover)
9. "Sara"
10. "Bella Donna"
11. "Blue Lamp"
12. "Leather and Lace"
13. "How Still My Love"
14. "Stop Draggin' My Heart Around"
15. "Edge of Seventeen"

Encore

16. "Rhiannon"

Tour dates

Date (1981)	City	Country	Venue
North America
November 28	Houston	United States	The Summit
November 29	Dallas	United States	Reunion Arena
December 1	Boulder	United States	CU Events Center
December 3	Oakland	United States	Oakland Coliseum
December 5	Tempe	United States	Compton Terrace
December 6	Beverly Hills (Note: Labeled as Los Angeles in promotional material.)	United States	Fox Wilshire Theater
December 7	Beverly Hills	United States	Fox Wilshire Theater
December 8	Beverly Hills	United States	Fox Wilshire Theater
December 12	Beverly Hills	United States	Fox Wilshire Theater
December 13	Beverly Hills	United States	Fox Wilshire Theater
