= Stop Draggin' My Heart Around =

1981 single by Stevie Nicks and Tom Petty

Single by Stevie Nicks & Tom Petty and the Heartbreakers

from the album Bella Donna
- B-side: "Kind of Woman"
- Released: July 8, 1981
- Recorded: 1981
- Genre: Rock; heartland rock
- Length: 4:03
- Label: Modern
- Songwriters: Tom Petty; Mike Campbell
- Producers: Jimmy Iovine; Tom Petty

Stevie Nicks singles chronology
"Stop Draggin' My Heart Around" (1981)	"Leather and Lace" (1981)

Tom Petty and the Heartbreakers singles chronology
"A Woman in Love (It's Not Me)" (1981)	"Stop Draggin' My Heart Around" (1981)	"You Got Lucky" (1982)

Music video
- "Stop Draggin' My Heart Around" on YouTube

"Stop Draggin' My Heart Around" is a song recorded by Stevie Nicks and Tom Petty and the Heartbreakers and released as the first single from Nicks' debut solo album Bella Donna (1981). The track is the album's only song that was neither written nor co-written by Nicks. Written by Tom Petty and Mike Campbell as a Tom Petty and the Heartbreakers song, Jimmy Iovine, who was also working for Stevie Nicks at the time, arranged for her to sing on it. Petty sings with Nicks in the chorus and bridge, while his entire band provides instrumentation with the exception of Ron Blair, who was replaced by bassist Donald "Duck" Dunn for the recording.

A performance of the song in the studio was used as the promotional video. The video was the 25th video to be played on MTV's launch date on August 1, 1981. Petty and Nicks also sang together on the songs "Insider" (from Petty's album Hard Promises (1981)) and "I Will Run to You" (from Nicks's album The Wild Heart (1983)), and frequently performed impromptu live versions of these and 1960s classic "Needles and Pins" in many shows through the 1980s.

As of 2017, "Stop Draggin' My Heart Around" remains a mainstay of Stevie Nicks' solo performances, and on July 9, 2017, Nicks performed the song together with Petty and the Heartbreakers at the British Summer Time festival at Hyde Park in London, in what turned out to be their final performance of the song together before Petty's death in October 2017.

The song peaked at No. 3 on the American Billboard Hot 100 for six consecutive weeks, making it both Nicks' and the Heartbreakers' biggest hit. However, in the United Kingdom, the song only managed to peak at No. 50 on the UK Singles Chart.

== Background ==
In a November 2003 interview with Songfacts, Tom Petty and the Heartbreakers guitarist and primary songwriter Mike Campbell explained the song's origins:

"Stop Draggin' My Heart Around" was a song that I had written the music and Tom had written the words. The Heartbreakers had recorded a version of it with Jimmy Iovine, and Jimmy being the entrepreneur that he was, he was working with Stevie, and I guess he asked Tom if she could try it, and it just developed from there. We cut the track as a Heartbreakers record and when she decided to do it we used that track and she came in and sang over it. It became a duet. It's basically all the Heartbreakers on that record.

The lyrics are about a woman who feels weighed down by relationships and wants to part despite a strong sentimental attachment to her lover. The melody is described by AllMusic as "dark and sinister". The song was originally recorded for Petty's album Hard Promises, but the producers felt the song came from a female point of view and it was left unreleased until it was agreed to be put on the Bella Donna album instead. A demo version of the song, recorded without Nicks, was eventually released on Petty's boxed set Playback (1995).

== Critical reception ==
Billboard called it a "punchy uptempo piece of rock." Record World said that "Nicks' uncompromising vocal pairs perfectly with Petty." Music Week wrote that the song was a "solid rocker which does lack 'special feel."

== Personnel ==
Band

- Stevie Nicks – lead vocals
- Lori Perry – backing vocals
- Sharon Celani – backing vocals
- Tom Petty – co-lead vocals, guitar
- Michael Campbell – lead guitar
- Benmont Tench – organ
- Stan Lynch – drums

Additional musicians

- Donald "Duck" Dunn – bass guitar
- Phil Jones – percussion

== Charts ==
=== Weekly charts ===
Chart (1981)	Peak position
Australia (Kent Music Report)	10
Canada Top Singles (RPM)	5
Netherlands (Single Top 100)	43
New Zealand (Recorded Music NZ)	11
South Africa (Springbok Radio)	4
UK Singles (Official Charts Company)	50
US Billboard Hot 100	3
US Mainstream Rock (Billboard)	2

=== Year-end charts ===
Chart (1981)	Rank
Australia (Kent Music Report)	64
Canada Top Singles (RPM)	31
US Billboard Hot 100	59

== Certifications ==
Region	Certification	Certified units/sales
Canada (Music Canada)	Gold	40,000^{‡}
New Zealand (RMNZ)	Platinum	30,000^{‡}
^{‡} Sales+streaming figures based on certification alone.

== Cover versions ==
The song was parodied by "Weird Al" Yankovic as "Stop Draggin' My Car Around" on his debut album "Weird Al" Yankovic (1983).

Jimmy Fallon and Stevie Nicks performed the song in a humorous recreation of the 1981 music video on The Tonight Show on April 9, 2014.
