= Edge of Seventeen =

1982 single by Stevie Nicks

- Artwork for US single

Single by Stevie Nicks

from the album Bella Donna
- B-side: "Outside the Rain"
- Released: February 4, 1982
- Recorded: 1981
- Genre: Rock
- Length: 5:28 (album version); 4:10 (single version)
- Label: Modern
- Songwriter: Stevie Nicks
- Producer: Jimmy Iovine

Stevie Nicks singles chronology
"Leather and Lace" (1981)	"Edge of Seventeen" (1982)	"After the Glitter Fades" (1982)

Performance video
- "Edge of Seventeen" (live) by Stevie Nicks on YouTube

Audio
- "Edge of Seventeen" (album version) by Stevie Nicks on YouTube

"Edge of Seventeen" is a song written and recorded by American singer-songwriter Stevie Nicks from her debut solo studio album Bella Donna (1981). It was released as the album's third single from the album on February 4, 1982. The lyrics were written by Nicks to express the grief resulting from the death of her uncle Jonathan and the murder of John Lennon during the same week of December 1980. The song features a chugging 16th-note guitar riff, drum beat, and a simple chord progression. Its title for the single release was "Edge of Seventeen (Just Like the White Winged Dove)".

Commercially, "Edge of Seventeen" peaked at number 11 in Canada and the United States, and was certified multi-platinum in Canada, New Zealand, and the United Kingdom. It became one of Nicks' most enduring and recognizable songs and has been covered by various artists. In 2021, it was ranked No. 217 on Rolling Stone's list of the "500 Greatest Songs of All Time". It was nominated at the 24th Annual Grammy Awards in 1982 for Best Female Rock Vocal Performance.

== Background and inspiration ==
According to Nicks, the title came from a conversation she had with Tom Petty's first wife, Jane, about the couple's first meeting. Jane said they met "at the age of seventeen", but Jane's strong Southern accent made it sound like "edge of seventeen" to Nicks. She liked the sound of the phrase so much that she told Jane she would write a song for it and give her credit for the inspiration.

Although Nicks had originally planned to use the title for a song about Tom and Jane Petty, the death of her uncle Jonathan and the murder of John Lennon during the same week of December 1980 inspired a new song for which Nicks used the title. Nicks' producer and lover Jimmy Iovine was a close friend of Lennon, and Nicks felt helpless to comfort him. Soon after, Nicks flew home to Phoenix, Arizona, to be with her uncle Jonathan, who was dying of cancer. She remained with her uncle and his family until his death.

Nicks had never actually heard a dove's call before, as she revealed in 2020 when she had only just heard it recently. The opening lyrics were inspired by a menu she was reading at a Phoenix restaurant in 1980, which said, "The white wing dove sings a song that sounds like she’s singing ooh, ooh, ooh. She makes her home here in the great Saguaro cactus that provides shelter and protection for her…".

== Composition ==
Nicks has said that the white-winged dove represents the spirit leaving the body on death, and some of the verses capture her experience of the days leading up to her uncle Jonathan's death. During the recording session for "Edge of Seventeen", someone from Nicks' backing band recommended that they emulate the guitar riff from The Police's "Bring On the Night", although guitarist Waddy Wachtel was unfamiliar with the song.

"I had never heard "Bring On the Night," and at that session they told me they were going to do this song based on this feel. I had heard something about the Police, but I didn't know what they were talking about. Then about two years ago, I had the radio on, and on comes what sounds like "Edge of Seventeen" – and all of a sudden, there's Sting's voice! I thought, 'We ripped them off completely!' I called Stevie that night and said, 'Listen to me, don't ever do that again!'"

== Reception ==
Record World praised the song for its "powerful lyrics, a percolating rhythm section and Stevie's throaty vocal." Author Zoë Howe, who wrote the Stevie Nicks – Visions, Dreams and Rumours biography, has described the song as being about "transforming and elevating the feelings of grief and soaring above them with strength" and having "a perfect combination of tough rock 'n' roll grit, raw emotion and full-beam, strut-about-in-platform-boots rock queen glamour."

== Chart performance ==
"Edge of Seventeen" peaked at No. 11 on the US Billboard Hot 100 for two weeks in April 1982. The live version on the B-side reached No. 26 on Billboard's Mainstream Rock chart. The original album version of the song had previously made the top five of Billboard's Mainstream Rock chart in 1981, peaking at No. 4. "Edge of Seventeen" also peaked at No. 11 on the RPM Top 100 Singles chart in Canada.

The song entered the UK chart in 2021, following its use in a John Lewis commercial.

== Track listings ==
Standard 7-inch single

1. "Edge of Seventeen" – 3:36
2. "Outside the Rain" – 4:17

US and Canadian 7-inch single

1. "Edge of Seventeen (Just Like the White Winged Dove)" – 4:10
2. "Edge of Seventeen" (Live Version) – 5:57

Italian 7-inch single

1. "Edge of Seventeen" – 5:26
2. "Leather and Lace" – 3:55

== Personnel ==
Musicians

- Stevie Nicks – lead vocals, writer
- Waddy Wachtel – guitar
- Bob Glaub – bass guitar
- Russ Kunkel – drums
- Bobbye Hall – percussion
- Benmont Tench – organ
- Roy Bittan – piano
- Lori Perry – backing vocals
- Sharon Celani – backing vocals

Production

- Jimmy Iovine – producer

== Charts ==
=== Weekly charts ===
Weekly chart performance for "Edge of Seventeen"
Chart (1981–1982)	Peak position
Canada Top Singles (RPM)	11
US Billboard Hot 100	11
US Mainstream Rock (Billboard)	4
US Cash Box Top 100	19
US Contemporary Hit Radio (Radio & Records)	11

Chart (2021)	Peak position
UK Singles (Official Charts)	86

=== Year-end charts ===
Year-end chart performance for "Edge of Seventeen"
Chart (1982)	Rank
US Billboard Hot 100	100
US Top 40 (Gavin Report)	78

== Certifications ==
Region	Certification	Certified units/sales
Canada (Music Canada)	3× Platinum	240,000^{‡}
New Zealand (RMNZ)	4× Platinum	120,000^{‡}
United Kingdom (BPI)	2× Platinum	1,200,000^{‡}
^{‡} Sales+streaming figures based on certification alone.

== Covers and sampling ==
- The guitar riff from the song was sampled by the American girl group Destiny's Child in their 2001 hit single "Bootylicious".
- American actress/singer Lindsay Lohan covered the song on her 2005 studio album A Little More Personal (Raw).
- In 2020, Miley Cyrus interpolated the song for her single "Midnight Sky", which was later remixed as a mashup featuring Nicks titled "Edge of Midnight".
- In 2022, American DJ and record producer Wuki released a remixed version of the track. This version was certified gold in Australia in 2024.

== Use in soundtracks ==
The song was used in the TV series The Crown.
