= Has Anyone Ever Written Anything for You? =

Single by Stevie Nicks

from the album Rock a Little
- B-side: "I Can't Wait" (Dub Mix)
- Released: May 12, 1986
- Genre: Soft rock
- Length: 4:38
- Label: Modern
- Songwriters: Stevie Nicks; Keith Olsen
- Producer: Rick Nowels

Stevie Nicks singles chronology
"I Can't Wait" (1985)	"Has Anyone Ever Written Anything for You?" (1986)	"Imperial Hotel" (1986)

Audio
- "Has Anyone Ever Written Anything for You" on YouTube

"Has Anyone Ever Written Anything for You?" is a song recorded by Stevie Nicks, co-written with Keith Olsen, for her third solo studio album Rock a Little (1985). The song was released as the album's third single on May 12, 1986, peaking at No. 60 for two weeks on the US Billboard Hot 100.

== Background ==
During the VH1 Storytellers series, Nicks explained that "Has Anyone Ever Written Anything for You?" was written about the death of Joe Walsh's three-year-old daughter, Emma Kristen, who was killed in an automobile accident on her way to nursery school. Walsh had previously dedicated "Song for Emma" to her on his 1974 album So What. Nicks and Walsh were traveling in Colorado when he recounted some of the memories he had with Emma, which Nicks discussed in the liner notes of her Timespace: The Best of Stevie Nicks compilation album in 1991.

I had been complaining about a lot of things...and he decided to make me aware of how unimportant my problems were. So he told me that he had taken this little girl to this magic park whenever he could, and the only thing she ever complained about was that she was too little to reach up to the drinking fountain.

Walsh had brought Nicks to the park, which had a small drinking fountain dedicated to Emma and "all others who were too small to get a drink". Once Nicks returned to Phoenix, she sat down at her Bösendorfer grand piano and wrote the song in roughly five minutes. Nicks said that the "priest of nothing" lyric referred to Walsh "and all the rock stars in the world I know" who were "legends" despite not exerting a lot of effort in their craft.

The song was developed further with Keith Olsen during the Rock a Little recording sessions. Olsen had suggested that they add a bridge and a key change, which he composed on a Kurzweil keyboard in Nicks' house. Nicks approved of this idea and developed a vocal melody to accompany it.

== Critical reception ==
Mike DeGagne of AllMusic retrospectively applauded Nicks for her "wholehearted approach" on "Has Anyone Ever Written Anything for You?" Billboard called the song a "low, throaty ballad with acoustic piano and reflective imagery." Cashbox characterized the song as "an emotion-packed ballad" with "poignant piano strains and a mesmerizing, somber Nicks vocal."

== Track listings ==
US and Canadian 7-inch single

1. "Has Anyone Ever Written Anything for You" – 4:35
2. "Imperial Hotel" – 2:53

Australian 7-inch single

1. "Has Anyone Ever Written Anything for You" – 4:35
2. "The Nightmare" – 5:08

UK and New Zealand 7-inch single

1. "Has Anyone Ever Written Anything for You" – 4:00
2. "I Can't Wait" (Dub Mix)

UK and New Zealand 12-inch single

1. "Has Anyone Ever Written Anything for You" – 4:35
2. "No Spoken Word"
3. "I Can't Wait" (Dub Mix)

== Personnel ==
Credits adapted from the Timespace: The Best of Stevie Nicks liner notes

- Stevie Nicks – lead vocals
- Lori Perry Nicks – backing vocals
- Carolyn Brooks – backing vocals
- Charles Judge – piano, synthesizer
- Jamie Sherrif – E-mu Emulator programming
- Michael Landau – guitar
- David Kemper – percussion

== Charts ==
Chart (1986)	Peak position
Canada Top Singles (RPM)	92
UK Singles (Official Charts)	84
US Billboard Hot 100	60
US Adult Contemporary (Billboard)	31
US Cash Box Top 100	63
US Adult Contemporary (Radio & Records)	26
