= Live from the Roxy =

Live from The Roxy

Live album by Bob Welch
- Released: 10 August 2004
- Recorded: 19 November 1981
- Genre: Rock
- Length: 72:01
- Label: Burning Airlines / Renaissance
- Producer: Bob Welch

Bob Welch chronology
His Fleetwood Mac Years & Beyond (2003)	Live from The Roxy (2004)	His Fleetwood Mac Years and Beyond, Vol. 2 (2006)

Live from the Roxy is a live album by the American rock musician Bob Welch, recorded in 1981, released in 2004, and later issued onto LP in 2021. Welch had been a member of Fleetwood Mac from 1971 to 1974, and this album features appearances by many members of that band.

Some releases omit "12 Bar Blues in A", and some incorrectly list "Remember Me" as "Don't You Think It's Time". This track originally featured on Fleetwood Mac's 1973 album Penguin. Other Fleetwood Mac songs included were "Hypnotized", from Mystery to Me; "Sentimental Lady" from Bare Trees; "Rattlesnake Shake" from Then Play On, and "Gold Dust Woman" from Rumours.

"Big Towne, 2061" and "Black Book" were songs by Paris, the band that Welch formed after he left Fleetwood Mac. "Hot Love, Cold World", "Outskirts" and "Ebony Eyes" first appeared on his first solo album French Kiss. "Precious Love" featured on 1979's Three Hearts, and "It's What Ya Don't Say", "Remember", "Two to Do" and "Bend Me, Shape Me" were originally released on his 1981 album Bob Welch.

== Track listing ==
No.	Title	Writer(s)	Original artist	Original appearance	Timing	Notes
1	Precious Love	Bob Welch	Bob Welch	Three Hearts (1979)	1:51	
2	Hot Love, Cold World	Bob Welch/John Henning	Bob Welch	French Kiss (1977)	2:33	
3	Big Towne, 2061 / Black Book	Bob Welch	Paris	Big Towne, 2061 (1977)/Paris 1976	3:53	
4	Hypnotized	Bob Welch	Fleetwood Mac	Mystery to Me (1973)	6:56	
5	Sentimental Lady	Bob Welch	Fleetwood Mac	Bare Trees (1972)	3:54	This version based on solo recording from French Kiss (1977)
6	It's What Ya Don't Say	Steve Diamond	Bob Welch	Bob Welch (1981)	3:18	
7	Bend Me, Shape Me	Scott English, Larry Weiss	The Outsiders	In (1966)	3:21	Sourced from cover on Bob Welch album
8	Outskirts	Bob Welch/John Carter	Bob Welch	French Kiss (1977)	11:35	
9	Two to Do	Michael Clark	Bob Welch	Bob Welch (1981)	3:40	
10	Remember	Bryan Adams/Jim Vallance	Bryan Adams	Bryan Adams (album) (1980)	4:41	Sourced from cover on Bob Welch album
11	Don't Give It Up	Robbie Patton/David Adelstein	Robbie Patton	Distant Shores (1981)	4:32	Sung by Robbie Patton
12	Gold Dust Woman	Stevie Nicks	Fleetwood Mac	Rumours (1977)	8:16	Sung by Stevie Nicks - Original version postdated Welch's time in Fleetwood Mac
13	Ebony Eyes	Bob Welch	Bob Welch	French Kiss (1977)	5:23	
14	Remember Me	Christine McVie	Fleetwood Mac	Penguin (1973)	2:47	Sung by Christine McVie
15	Rattlesnake Shake	Peter Green	Fleetwood Mac	Then Play On (1969)	6:40	Original version predated Welch's time in Fleetwood Mac but was frequently performed during his time in the band. Running time for Rattlesnake Shake is only 5:07, rest of track is the beginning of 12 Bar Blues in A on all current downloadable versions.
16	12 Bar Blues in A	Bob Welch	Bob Welch	This album	7:49	Not included on all pressings

== Personnel ==
=== Bob Welch's Band ===
- Bob Welch – vocals, guitar
- David Adelstein – keyboards
- Joey Brasler – guitar
- Robin Sylvester – bass guitar, backing vocals
- Robbie Patton – vocals (on 11 & 16), percussion
- Alvin Taylor – drums, percussion

=== Guests (in order of appearance) ===
- Mick Fleetwood – drums, percussion (on 4, 5, 12, 15 & 16)
- John McVie – bass guitar (on 4)
- Christine McVie – vocals, keyboards, tambourine (on 4, 5, 11, 13, 14, 15 & 16)
- Carmine Appice – drums (on 8 & 16)
- Stevie Nicks – vocals, tambourine (on 12, 13 & 15)
- Bob Weston – guitar (on 14 & 16)
- Ann Wilson – vocals (on 16)
- Mark Stein – keyboards (on 16)
- Howard Leese – guitar (on 16)

== Production ==
- Produced by Bob Welch
- Mickey Shapiro - executive producer
- Ron Moss - associate producer
- Michael Verdick - audio producer
- Curry Grant - stage lighting
- Jerry Watson - lighting for television
- Dennis Rosenblatt - associate director
- Tom Potter - videotape editor
- Dave Collins - videotape editor
