= List of Fleetwood Mac members =

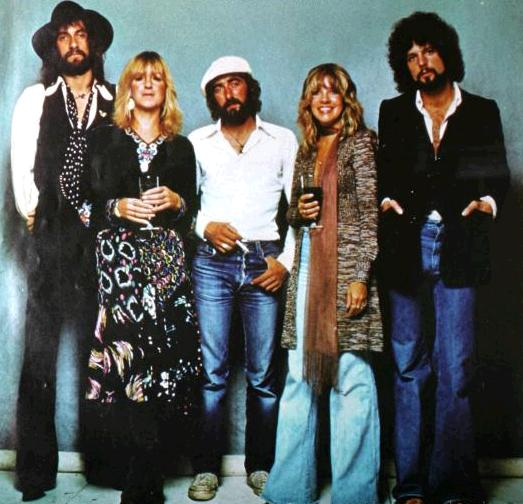
Classic lineup of Fleetwood Mac in 1977, from left to right: Mick Fleetwood, Christine and John McVie, Stevie Nicks and Lindsey Buckingham.

Fleetwood Mac were a British-American rock band originally formed in London. Formed in July 1967, the group originally consisted of lead guitarist and singer Peter Green, slide guitarist and singer Jeremy Spencer, bassist Bob Brunning and drummer Mick Fleetwood. After several personnel changes, the band's classic lineup, in place from December 1974 to September 1987, consisted of Fleetwood, bassist John McVie, keyboardist and singer Christine McVie, singer Stevie Nicks, and guitarist and singer Lindsey Buckingham. The band then underwent several more changes in personnel, with the final lineup, beginning in November 2018, consisting of Fleetwood, John and Christine McVie, Nicks, lead guitarist Mike Campbell and rhythm guitarist and singer Neil Finn. Christine McVie died in 2022, after which Nicks stated that the band would not continue without her.

== History ==
=== 1967–1973 ===
After leaving John Mayall & the Bluesbreakers, guitarist and vocalist Peter Green and drummer Mick Fleetwood formed Fleetwood Mac in July 1967 with slide guitarist Jeremy Spencer and bassist Bob Brunning. In September, Brunning was replaced by John McVie, Green and Fleetwood's original choice for the role. Danny Kirwan was added as a third guitarist following the release of Mr. Wonderful in August 1968. Green suddenly left the band in 1970 due to problems with drug abuse and mental health issues, playing his last show with the band on 20 May. McVie's wife Christine – who had collaborated with the band multiple times – joined on keyboards and vocals shortly after Green's departure, officially becoming a member in August.

During a United States tour in February 1971, Spencer departed Fleetwood Mac after leaving the band's Los Angeles hotel and not returning; it was later revealed that he had joined the Children of God organisation. Green temporarily returned to take Spencer's place on the tour, with Bob Welch joining after its conclusion. Kirwan was fired by Fleetwood in August 1972, after he got into a drunken argument with Welch backstage, injured himself, broke his guitar and refused to perform. He was replaced by Bob Weston the following month, when vocalist Dave Walker also joined the band. Walker had left by June the following year, shortly after the release of Penguin. Weston stayed to perform on its follow-up Mystery to Me later in the year, but was fired in October after having an affair with Fleetwood's wife Jenny Boyd Fleetwood.

=== 1974 onwards ===
After spending much of the year involved in a legal dispute with former manager Clifford Davis, the four-piece Fleetwood Mac returned in late 1974 with Heroes Are Hard to Find. By the end of the year, Welch had left the band, with his replacement Lindsey Buckingham joining on New Year's Eve 1974 with his girlfriend, vocalist Stevie Nicks. This lineup of the band remained constant for over twelve years and multiple successful releases, before Buckingham left in August 1987. He was replaced by two guitarists: Billy Burnette and Rick Vito. Nicks and Christine McVie both retired from the touring lineup of the band after the last show of the Behind the Mask Tour on 7 December 1990, although McVie contributed to recordings for the band's next studio album Time in 1995. Vito also left the band in October 1991.

The 1974–1987 lineup of Fleetwood Mac reunited for a performance at Bill Clinton's inauguration on 20 January 1993. Nicks and Burnette left the band shortly thereafter, with Bekka Bramlett and Dave Mason, respectively, replacing the departed members later in the year. Both performed on 1995's Time, which also featured a returning Burnette on guitar. Shortly after the album was released in October, Fleetwood Mac disbanded. Within a year, however, the band had returned with a lineup including Nicks, Buckingham, the McVies and Fleetwood. They returned to touring in 1997, releasing the live album The Dance in August, before Christine McVie left again in 1998 and all but retired from music. She ultimately returned to Fleetwood Mac sixteen years later in January 2014.

In April 2018, Buckingham was fired from Fleetwood Mac after a disagreement over touring; he was replaced by two guitarists, Mike Campbell and Neil Finn.

Christine McVie died in 2022, putting the future of the band in question, with Nicks saying in October 2023 that she has no desire to continue the band after McVie's death.

== Members ==
Image	Name	Years active	Instruments	Release contributions
	Mick Fleetwood	1967–1995; 1997–2022	drums; percussion; occasional guitar, keyboards and vocals	all Fleetwood Mac releases
	Peter Green	1967–1970 (substitute for Spencer at a few shows in 1971) (died 2020)	guitar; lead and backing vocals; harmonica	all Fleetwood Mac releases from Fleetwood Mac (1968) to Then Play On (1969); The Original Fleetwood Mac (1971); Live in Boston (1985); London Live '68 (1986); Live at the Marquee 1967 (1992); Live at the BBC (1995); Shrine '69 (1999); appeared on Penguin and Tusk as an uncredited guest musician
	Jeremy Spencer	1967–1971	slide guitar; lead and backing vocals; piano	all Fleetwood Mac releases from Fleetwood Mac (1968) to The Original Fleetwood Mac (1971); Live in Boston (1985); London Live '68 (1986); Live at the Marquee 1967 (1992); Live at the BBC (1995); Shrine '69 (1999)
	Bob Brunning	1967 (died 2011)	bass	Fleetwood Mac (1968) – one track only; The Original Fleetwood Mac (1971); Live at the Marquee 1967 (1992)
	John McVie	1967–1995; 1997–2022	bass; occasional backing vocals and keyboards	all Fleetwood Mac releases, except Live at the Marquee 1967 (1992)
	Danny Kirwan	1968–1972 (died 2018)	guitar; lead and backing vocals	English Rose (1969); Then Play On (1969); Kiln House (1970); Future Games (1971); Bare Trees (1972); Live in Boston (1985); Live at the BBC (1995); Shrine '69 (1999)
	Christine McVie	1970–1995; 1997–1998; 2014–2022 (her death)	keyboards; percussion; lead and backing vocals	all Fleetwood Mac releases from Future Games (1971) to Mirage Tour (1983); Tango in the Night (1987); Tango in the Night Tour (1988); Behind the Mask (1990); 25 Years – The Chain (1992); Time (1995); The Dance (1997); as a session musician: Mr. Wonderful (1968); Then Play On (1969); Kiln House (1970); Say You Will (2003)
	Bob Welch	1971–1974 (died 2012)	guitar; lead and backing vocals	all Fleetwood Mac releases from Future Games (1971) to Heroes Are Hard to Find (1974)
	Bob Weston	1972–1973 (died 2012)	lead and slide guitar; backing vocals	Penguin (1973); Mystery to Me (1973)
	Dave Walker	1972–1973	lead and backing vocals; harmonica	Penguin (1973)
	Lindsey Buckingham	1974–1987; 1997–2018	guitar; lead and backing vocals; keyboards; occasional bass, drums, percussion and programming	all Fleetwood Mac releases from Fleetwood Mac (1975) to Mirage Tour (1983); Tango in the Night (1987); The Dance (1997); all Fleetwood Mac releases from Say You Will (2003) onwards; as a session musician on Behind the Mask (1990), 25 Years – The Chain (1992) and Time (1995).
	Stevie Nicks	1974–1990; 1997–2022	lead and backing vocals; tambourine; occasional keyboards & piano	all Fleetwood Mac releases from Fleetwood Mac (1975) to Mirage Tour (1983); Tango in the Night (1987); Tango in the Night Tour (1988); Behind the Mask (1990); The Dance (1997); all Fleetwood Mac releases from Say You Will (2003) onwards
	Billy Burnette	1987–1995	rhythm guitar; backing and lead vocals	Tango in the Night Tour (1988); Behind the Mask (1990); 25 Years – The Chain (1992); Time (1995)
	Rick Vito	1987–1990	lead guitar; backing and lead vocals	Tango in the Night Tour (1988); Behind the Mask (1990)
	Dave Mason	1993–1995 (died 2026)	lead guitar; backing and lead vocals	Time (1995)
	Bekka Bramlett	1993–1995	lead and backing vocals	Time (1995)
	Mike Campbell	2018–2022	lead guitar; backing and occasional lead vocals	none
	Neil Finn	2018–2022	rhythm and lead guitar; lead and backing vocals	none

=== Touring ===
Image	Name	Years active	Instruments	Release contributions
	Nigel Watson	1971 (died 2019)	percussion	Watson joined Fleetwood Mac alongside Peter Green for the band's early 1971 tour of the United States.
	Doug Graves	1974	keyboards	Graves joined the band as a second keyboardist for the Heroes Are Hard to Find Tour in late 1974.
	Bobby Hunt	1974	keyboards	Hunt replaced Graves during the Heroes Are Hard to Find Tour, remaining until its conclusion in December.
	Ray Lindsey	1977–1982	rhythm guitar	Lindsey Buckingham's guitar tech Lindsey contributed guitar during shows between 1977 and 1982.
	Jeffery Sova	1979–1980	keyboards	Sova and Todaro performed on the Tusk Tour from 1979 to 1980, featuring on the 1980 Live release.
	Tony Todaro	1979–1980	percussion	Sova and Todaro performed on the Tusk Tour from 1979 to 1980, featuring on the 1980 Live release.
	Sharon Celani	1987–1990; 1997–2022	backing vocals	Since joining on the Shake the Cage Tour in 1987, Celani has performed on multiple Fleetwood Mac tours.
	Okyerema Asante	1987–1990	percussion	Asante and Garfield joined Fleetwood Mac on percussion and keyboards starting with the band's Shake the Cage Tour in 1987.
	Dan Garfield	1987–1990	keyboards; programming	Asante and Garfield joined Fleetwood Mac on percussion and keyboards starting with the band's Shake the Cage Tour in 1987.
	Lori Nicks	1987–1988; 2009–2016	backing vocals	Nicks performed with Fleetwood Mac on the Shake the Cage Tour, and later from 2009 to 2016.
	Eliscia Wright	1987–1988	backing vocals	Wright toured with the band as one of three backing vocalists on the 1987–1988 Shake the Cage Tour.
	Lynn Mabry	1990	backing vocals	Mabry and Likins toured with Fleetwood Mac as two of their backing vocalists for the Behind the Mask Tour.
	Liza Jane Likins	1990	backing vocals	Mabry and Likins toured with Fleetwood Mac as two of their backing vocalists for the Behind the Mask Tour.
	Steve Thoma	1994–1995	keyboards; percussion; backing vocals	Thoma joined the band for the Another Link in the Chain Tour in 1994, and performed on the album Time.
	Brett Tuggle	1997–2018 (died 2022)	keyboards; backing vocals; rhythm guitar; programming; samples	Tuggle and Heywood were main fixtures of Fleetwood Mac's touring band between 1997 and 2018. Tuggle left the touring lineup to play with Buckingham after the latter's dismissal.
	Neale Heywood	1997–2022	rhythm guitar; backing vocals	Tuggle and Heywood were main fixtures of Fleetwood Mac's touring band between 1997 and 2018. Tuggle left the touring lineup to play with Buckingham after the latter's dismissal.
	Mindy Stein	1997–2003	backing vocals	Stein joined Fleetwood Mac's touring lineup for The Dance Tour, remaining until the 2003 Say You Will Tour.
	Lenny Castro	1997–1998; 2001	percussion	Castro performed percussion on the band's reunion tour The Dance in 1997. He also played at Clinton's "going away party" in 2001.
	Steve Rinkov	2003–2018	percussion; additional drums	Rinkov has performed additional percussion and drums for the band from their 2003 Say You Will Tour until early 2018.
	Carlos Rios	2003–2004	rhythm guitar	Rios and Hirano performed with Fleetwood Mac between 2003 and 2004 on the Say You Will Tour. Hirano returned in 2018 for the An Evening with Fleetwood Mac tour.
	Taku Hirano	2003–2004; 2018–2022	percussion	Rios and Hirano performed with Fleetwood Mac between 2003 and 2004 on the Say You Will Tour. Hirano returned in 2018 for the An Evening with Fleetwood Mac tour.
	Jana Anderson	2003–2009	backing vocals	Anderson joined partway through the Say You Will Tour, replacing former backing vocalist Mindy Stein.
	Stevvi Alexander	2014–2018	backing vocals	Alexander joined as the band's third live backing vocalist starting for the On with the Show Tour in 2014.
	Marilyn Martin	2018–2022	backing vocals	Martin replaced Stevvi Alexander as the band's second live backing vocalist for the An Evening with Fleetwood Mac Tour.
	Ricky Peterson	2018–2022	keyboards; backing vocals	Peterson replaced Brett Tuggle as the band's touring keyboardist for the An Evening with Fleetwood Mac tour.

== Lineups ==
Period	Members	Releases
July – September 1967	Peter Green – guitar, vocals, harmonica; Jeremy Spencer – slide guitar, vocals, piano; Bob Brunning – bass guitar; Mick Fleetwood – drums, percussion	"I Believe My Time Ain't Long" (1967); Fleetwood Mac (1968) – One track only; Live at the Marquee 1967 (1992)
September 1967 – August 1968	Peter Green – guitar, vocals, harmonica; Jeremy Spencer – slide guitar, vocals, piano; John McVie – bass guitar; Mick Fleetwood – drums, percussion	Fleetwood Mac (1968); "Black Magic Woman" (1968); "Need Your Love So Bad" (1968); Mr. Wonderful (1968); London Live '68 (1998)
August 1968 – May 1970	Peter Green – guitar, vocals, harmonica; Jeremy Spencer – slide guitar, vocals, piano; Danny Kirwan – guitar, vocals; John McVie – bass guitar; Mick Fleetwood – drums, percussion	"Albatross" (1968); "Man of the World" (1969); Then Play On (1969); "Oh Well" (1969); Fleetwood Mac in Chicago (1969); "The Green Manalishi" (1970); Live in Boston (1985); Shrine '69 (1999)
May – July 1970	Jeremy Spencer – slide guitar, vocals, piano; Danny Kirwan – guitar, vocals; John McVie – bass guitar; Mick Fleetwood – drums, percussion	Kiln House (1970)
July 1970 – February 1971	Jeremy Spencer – slide guitar, vocals, piano; Danny Kirwan – guitar, vocals; Christine McVie – keyboards, vocals; John McVie – bass guitar; Mick Fleetwood – drums, percussion	"Dragonfly" (1971)
February – April 1971	Danny Kirwan – guitar, vocals; Christine McVie – keyboards, vocals; John McVie – bass guitar; Mick Fleetwood – drums, percussion; Peter Green – guitar, vocals (rejoined temporarily when Spencer left during a tour)	none
April 1971 – August 1972	Danny Kirwan – lead guitar, vocals; Bob Welch – rhythm guitar, vocals; Christine McVie – keyboards, vocals; John McVie – bass guitar; Mick Fleetwood – drums, percussion	Future Games (1971); Bare Trees (1972)
September 1972 – June 1973	Dave Walker – vocals, harmonica; Bob Weston – lead guitar, backing vocals, banjo, harmonica; Bob Welch – rhythm guitar, vocals; Christine McVie – keyboards, vocals; John McVie – bass guitar; Mick Fleetwood – drums, percussion	Penguin (1973)
June – October 1973	Bob Weston – lead guitar, backing vocals, slide guitar; Bob Welch – rhythm guitar, vocals; Christine McVie – keyboards, vocals; John McVie – bass guitar; Mick Fleetwood – drums, percussion	Mystery to Me (1973)
October 1973 – December 1974	Bob Welch – guitar, vocals; Christine McVie – keyboards, vocals; John McVie – bass guitar; Mick Fleetwood – drums, percussion	Heroes Are Hard to Find (1974)
December 1974 – August 1987	Stevie Nicks – vocals, tambourine; Lindsey Buckingham – guitar, vocals, keyboards; Christine McVie – keyboards, vocals; John McVie – bass guitar; Mick Fleetwood – drums, percussion	Fleetwood Mac (1975); Rumours (1977); Tusk (1979); Live (1980); Mirage (1982); Mirage Tour (1983); Tango in the Night (1987); In Concert (2016); Rumours Live (2023)
September 1987 – December 1990	Stevie Nicks – vocals, tambourine; Rick Vito – lead guitar, vocals; Billy Burnette – rhythm guitar, vocals; Christine McVie – keyboards, vocals; John McVie – bass guitar; Mick Fleetwood – drums, percussion	Tango in the Night Tour (1988); Greatest Hits (1988) – Two new tracks "As Long as You Follow" and "No Questions Asked"; Behind the Mask (1990); 25 Years – The Chain (1992) – One new track "Paper Doll"
December 1990 – July 1994	Billy Burnette – guitar, vocals; Christine McVie – keyboards, vocals; John McVie – bass guitar; Mick Fleetwood – drums, percussion	25 Years – The Chain (1992) – Two new tracks "Love Shines" and "Heart of Stone". Another new track, "Make Me a Mask", was a solo contribution from then-former member Lindsey Buckingham.
July 1994 – January 1996	Bekka Bramlett – vocals; Dave Mason – lead guitar, vocals; Billy Burnette – rhythm guitar, vocals; Christine McVie – keyboards, vocals (studio only); John McVie – bass guitar; Mick Fleetwood – drums, percussion	Time (1995)
Band inactive January 1996 – March 1997
March 1997 – March 1998	Stevie Nicks – vocals, tambourine; Lindsey Buckingham – guitar, banjo, vocals; Christine McVie – keyboards, vocals; John McVie – bass guitar, vocals; Mick Fleetwood – drums, percussion	The Dance (1997)
March 1998 – January 2014	Stevie Nicks – vocals, keyboards, tambourine; Lindsey Buckingham – guitar, vocals, keyboards; John McVie – bass guitar; Mick Fleetwood – drums, percussion	Say You Will (2003); Live in Boston (2004); Extended Play (2013)
January 2014 – April 2018	Stevie Nicks – vocals, tambourine; Lindsey Buckingham – guitar, vocals; Christine McVie – keyboards, vocals; John McVie – bass guitar; Mick Fleetwood – drums, percussion	none
April 2018 – November 2022	Stevie Nicks – vocals, tambourine; Mike Campbell – lead guitar; Neil Finn – rhythm guitar, vocals; Christine McVie – keyboards, vocals; John McVie – bass guitar; Mick Fleetwood – drums, percussion	none
