= Night Watch (song) =

Song by Fleetwood Mac

from the album Penguin
- Released: March 1973
- Recorded: January 1973
- Studio: Rolling Stones Mobile Studio, Benifold, Hampshire; AIR Studios, London
- Length: 6:17
- Label: Reprise
- Songwriter: Bob Welch
- Producers: Fleetwood Mac; Martin Birch

"Night Watch" is a song by British-American rock band Fleetwood Mac, written and sung by Bob Welch. It is the penultimate track on the band's seventh studio album Penguin, which was released in 1973. The song includes uncredited guitar playing from Peter Green, a founding member of Fleetwood Mac who departed from the band in 1970. Since its release on Penguin, Fleetwood Mac played the song live up until the departure of Welch.

== Background ==
Welch wrote "Night Watch" about the witnessing of paranormal activities, particularly the sighting of UFO landings, which are referenced in the song as "magic shadows". Peter Green, who was one of the founding members of Fleetwood Mac, visited the band in the recording studio during the making of Penguin and recorded a guitar part on "Night Watch", which was uncredited in the album liner notes. In his first memoir, Mick Fleetwood mentioned that Green was successfully convinced to overdub some "far-echo guitar" on the track. He recorded his parts at AIR Studios in London while the band was conducting overdubs. Bob Weston recalled that Green would occasionally visit the band in the recording studio, which would invariably lead to a jam session with the band. Welch said that Green recorded his part in an echo chamber situated in the basement, where he "just did what he wanted". Prior to the overdubbing session, Green spent most of his visit "just sitting in the corner, not saying anything." After he completed his part, Green left the recording studio without conversing with the rest of Fleetwood Mac.

Peter Green showed up with his guitar which was surprising because at the time he was refusing to play with anyone and was going through a difficult period in his life. There was one part in the tune that needed something special and with no disrespect to Bob Welch or Weston, it was not happening musically. Who persuaded him or how he was persuaded to play I do not clearly remember, but I think he nailed the track on the second take. Truely magical.

— Dave Walker

Steve Nye, who at the time was working as a tape op at AIR Studios where Penguin was mixed, played organ on "Night Watch". In his book Fleetwood Mac FAQ, Ryan Reed described Nye's organ playing as the song's "secret weapon". A few years after the recording of Penguin, Nye would later co-found the Penguin Cafe Orchestra. The vocal harmonies on "Night Watch" were built around block chords, which Reed thought was evocative of Crosby, Stills and Nash. During Fleetwood Mac's tour promoting their Heroes Are Hard to Find album in 1974, "Night Watch" was one of the songs included in the setlist. During these performances, Fleetwood would play an African talking drum solo.

== Critical reception ==
Tony Stewart of New Musical Express called "Night Watch" "the most impressive piece of writing" on Penguin. Cashbox predicted that "Night Watch" would be "a big favorite for FM programmers." In their book, Fleetwood Mac: Rumours n' Fax, Roy Carr and Steve Clarke labelled "Night Watch" as Welch's one song on Penguin that "exudes genuine inspiration" and an example of where his "predilection for spacey studio effects doesn't backfire on him". Colin Larkin was dismissive of the Penguin album as a whole but singled out "Night Watch" as an "excellent composition". Richie Unterberger characterised it as a "catchy pop-rock song in the vein of 'Sentimental Lady'". Dave Thompson of Goldmine identified "Night Watch" as one of Fleetwood Mac's most underrated songs.

== Personnel ==
- Mick Fleetwood – drum kit, talking drum
- John McVie – bass guitar
- Christine McVie – piano, backing vocals
- Bob Welch – guitar, lead vocals
- Dave Walker – backing vocals
- Bob Weston – guitar
- Peter Green – guitar
- Steve Nye – organ
