= His Fleetwood Mac Years & Beyond =

Studio album by Bob Welch
- Released: 8 July 2003
- Recorded: 2003
- Genre: Rock
- Length: 65:57
- Label: One Way
- Producer: Bob Welch

Bob Welch chronology
Bob Welch Looks At Bop (1999)	His Fleetwood Mac Years & Beyond (2003)	Live from the Roxy (2004)

Professional ratings
Review scores
Source	Rating
Allmusic	4/5 stars

Bob Welch: His Fleetwood Mac Years & Beyond is an album by former Fleetwood Mac guitarist turned solo artist Bob Welch, released in 2003. As the title suggests, most of the songs were rerecordings of songs he had written and recorded both with Fleetwood Mac and solo. The album also contained a recording of "Oh Well", a Mac hit from before Welch's time in the group, that he sang many times after Peter Green's departure; and a brand new track, "Like Rain". The album was re-released in 2008 as Greatest Hits & More – Revisited.

== Track listing ==
No.	Title	Writer(s)	Original artist	Original appearance	Timing	Notes
1	"Oh Well"	Peter Green	Fleetwood Mac	Single (1969)	9:03	Original version predated Welch's time in Fleetwood Mac
2	"Future Games"	Bob Welch	Fleetwood Mac	Future Games (1971)	8:42	Also appeared on Welch's The Other One (1979)
3	"Revelation"	Bob Welch	Fleetwood Mac	Penguin (1973)	4:42	
4	"Miles Away"	Bob Welch	Fleetwood Mac	Mystery to Me (1973)	3:48	
5	"Hypnotized"	Bob Welch	Fleetwood Mac	Mystery to Me (1973)	4:22	
6	"Emerald Eyes"	Bob Welch	Fleetwood Mac	Mystery to Me (1973)	3:16	
7	"Bermuda Triangle"	Bob Welch	Fleetwood Mac	Heroes Are Hard to Find (1974)	4:10	
8	"Angel"	Bob Welch	Fleetwood Mac	Heroes Are Hard to Find (1974)	4:12	
9	"Silver Heels"	Bob Welch	Fleetwood Mac	Heroes Are Hard to Find (1974)	3:20	
10	"Sentimental Lady"	Bob Welch	Fleetwood Mac	Bare Trees (1972)	3:26	This version based on solo recording from French Kiss (1977)
11	"Ebony Eyes"	Bob Welch/John Henning	Bob Welch	French Kiss (1977)	3:16	
12	"Hot Love, Cold World"	Bob Welch	Bob Welch	French Kiss (1977)	3:42	
13	"Precious Love"	Bob Welch	Bob Welch	Three Hearts (1979)	3:19	
14	"Church"	Bob Welch	Bob Welch	Three Hearts (1979)	3:02	
15	"Like Rain"	Bob Welch	Bob Welch	This album	3:04	New track

== Personnel ==
=== Musicians ===
- Bob Welch – all vocals & various instruments

=== Technical ===
- Bob Welch – producer
- Eddie Wilner – executive producer
