= Did You Ever Love Me (Fleetwood Mac song) =

1973 single by Fleetwood Mac

Single by Fleetwood Mac

from the album Penguin
- B-side: "Revelation" (US); "The Derelict" (UK)
- Released: June 1973
- Recorded: January 1973
- Studio: Rolling Stones Mobile Studio, Benifold, Hampshire
- Length: 3:38
- Label: Reprise
- Songwriters: Bob Welch; Christine McVie
- Producer: Fleetwood Mac

Fleetwood Mac singles chronology
"Remember Me" (1973)	"Did You Ever Love Me" (1973)	"For Your Love" (1973)

"Did You Ever Love Me" is a song by British rock group Fleetwood Mac from their 1973 Penguin album. The song was co-written by Bob Welch and Christine McVie at the band's communal house in Benifold. McVie shared lead vocals with Bob Weston, who replaced Danny Kirwan following his dismissal from the band the previous year. "Did You Ever Love Me" is the only Fleetwood Mac song with lead vocal contributions from Weston, who was fired from the band later that year while touring the band's Mystery to Me album. The song was also released as a single in the UK and United States and failed to chart in either of those countries.

== Background ==
Welch and McVie wrote "Did You Ever Love Me" at their Benifold communal house, which the band resided in from 1971 to 1973. Much of the writing was done in one of the living rooms that was shared by Christine and John McVie. The song started with McVie's keyboard part, after which the lyrics were developed over the next few days. They then built the song around a groove from a drum machine. Welch called the song a "true collaboration, where you can't easily separate everything out." The song's lyrics pertain to a futile attempt to preserve a romantic relationship.

When Fleetwood Mac was rehearsing "Did You Ever Love Me" in the studio, Weston was singing "just for fun". The band approved of what they heard, and McVie suggested that they sing "Did You Ever Love Me" as a duet. Welch commented that the band wanted Weston to have "a little showcase" on "Did You Ever Love Me" and quipped that it was "his big chance at the "Engelbert Humperdinck" thing we all knew he was capable of." Weston had been hired by the band chiefly for his guitar playing and did not sing on any other Fleetwood Mac song during his tenure with them.

"Did You Ever Love Me" is the only song in Fleetwood Mac's discography to feature steel drums. Welch said that Fleetwood owned a set of steel drums and "always liked unusual percussion instruments." In a 1999 Q&A, Weston recalled that it was "a band decision" to use steel drums on "Did You Ever Love Me". Three session musicians were enlisted to play the steel drum parts.

On 22 June 1973, "Did You Ever Love Me" was released as a single in the UK. Its B-side was "The Derelict", a song written by Dave Walker, who was a member of Fleetwood Mac exclusively for the Penguin album. The single was not released in America until 29 August 1973, with Welch's song "Revelation" being selected as the B-side instead. In both countries, the single failed to chart. Weston said that the band "may have performed ["Did You Ever Love Me"] live once or twice, but it wasn't a regular fixture." In 2024, the song was included the Best of Fleetwood Mac 1969-1974 compilation album.

== Critical reception ==
Billboard listed "Did You Ever Love Me" as one of its recommended single picks in the 8 September 1973 edition of its publication. Earlier in the year, it had also listed "Did You Ever Love Me" as one of the best tracks on Penguin. Cashbox wrote that the band had "outdone all of their previous efforts with a sensational ballad certain to be one of their biggest hits ever." Tony Stewart of NME called "Did You Ever Love Me" a "soothing" song with "imaginative steel drums".

In a retrospective review, Mojo believed that the song's steel drums "cemented the sense of Penguin as [an] outlier." In their book, Fleetwood Mac: Rumours n' Fax, Roy Carr and Steve Clarke stated that the song possessed a "well-metered melody [that] glides in a way that is reminiscent of those Smokey Robinson velvet-gloved soul ballads." They also felt that it took an "eternity" to release another single that matched the quality of "Did You Ever Love Me" and lamented that the Welch-McVie writing partnership was not explored further. David Bowling of The Daily Vault thought that the song demonstrated the compatibility of Welch and McVie as songwriters. Writing for Dig!, Joe Tiller characterised "Did You Ever Love Me" as "a relaxed, mid-paced shuffle complete with steel drums" and said that the song "hint[ed] at McVie's capacity for airwave-conquering melodies."

== Personnel ==
- Bob Welch – guitar
- Bob Weston – guitar, vocals
- Christine McVie – keyboards, vocals
- John McVie – bass guitar
- Mick Fleetwood – drum kit
- Ralph Richardson – steel drums
- Russell Valdez – steel drums
- Fred Totesant – steel drums
