= His Fleetwood Mac Years and Beyond, Vol. 2 =

Studio album by Bob Welch
- Released: 28 March 2006
- Recorded: 2005–06
- Genre: Rock
- Length: 36:12
- Label: Reality / AAO Music
- Producer: Bob Welch

Bob Welch chronology
Live from the Roxy (2004)	His Fleetwood Mac Years and Beyond, Vol. 2 (2006)	Live in Japan" and "Sings The Best Songs Ever Written (2011)

Bob Welch: His Fleetwood Mac Years & Beyond Vol. 2 is an album of re-recordings of songs by former Fleetwood Mac guitarist turned solo artist Bob Welch, released in 2006 as a follow-up to the 2003 album His Fleetwood Mac Years & Beyond. This album contains six brand new songs in addition to re-recordings of two of Welch's earlier solo tracks and three Fleetwood Mac tracks from before and after Welch's tenure in the group. There are also re-recordings of three songs Welch had recorded while in the group, although two of them only appear on the digital edition.

== Track listing ==
No.	Title	Writer(s)	Original artist	Original appearance	Timing	Notes
1	"Never Say Never"	Bob Welch	Bob Welch	This album	2:59	New track
2	"Black Magic Woman"	Peter Green	Fleetwood Mac	1968 single	2:56	Original version predated Welch's time in Fleetwood Mac
3	"Rhiannon"	Stevie Nicks	Fleetwood Mac	Fleetwood Mac (1975)	4:33	Original version postdated Welch's time in Fleetwood Mac
4	"Two Sides to Beautiful"	Bob Welch/Bob Mylan	Bob Welch	This album	2:42	New track
5	"The Girl Can't Stop"	Bob Welch	Bob Welch	Man Overboard (1980)	3:07	
6	"Feet of Clay"	Bob Welch	Bob Welch	This album	3:04	New track
7	"Rebel Rouser"	Bob Welch	Bob Welch	The Other One (1979)	4:51	
8	"Mystery to Me"	Bob Welch	Bob Welch	This album	2:35	New track - named for 1973 Fleetwood Mac album
9	"World Turning"	Christine McVie/Lindsey Buckingham	Fleetwood Mac	Fleetwood Mac (1975)	3:37	Original version postdated Welch's time in Fleetwood Mac
10	"Ray"	Bob Welch	Bob Welch	This album	2:41	New track - tribute to Ray Charles
11	"The City"	Bob Welch	Fleetwood Mac	Mystery to Me (1973)	3:07	
12	"What a True Love Is"	Bob Welch	Bob Welch	This album	3:21	New track
13	"Somebody"	Bob Welch	Fleetwood Mac	Mystery to Me (1973)	5:16	iTunes edition only
14	"The Ghost"	Bob Welch	Fleetwood Mac	Bare Trees (1972)	4:00	iTunes edition only

== Credits ==
- Bob Welch : All vocals and instruments

== Production ==
- Produced by Bob Welch
