= Greatest Hits (Bob Welch album) =

Greatest hits album by Bob Welch
- Released: 1994
- Recorded: 1977–79
- Genre: Rock
- Label: Curb Records

Bob Welch chronology
The Best Of Bob Welch (1991)	Greatest Hits (1994)	Bob Welch Looks At Bop (1999)

Greatest Hits is a compilation of Bob Welch songs from his first four albums, which were released when he was signed to Capitol Records.

== Track listing ==
1. "Sentimental Lady"
2. "Ebony Eyes"
3. "Precious Love"
4. "Hot Love, Cold World"
5. "Church"
6. "Come Softly To Me"
7. "The Girl Can't Stop"
8. "Spanish Dancers"
9. "3 Hearts"
10. "Jealous"

== Production ==
- Various producers
