= Don't Give It Up (Robbie Patton song) =

Single by Robbie Patton

from the album Distant Shores
- B-side: "When Love Disappears"
- Released: 22 August 1981
- Recorded: 1980
- Studio: Village Recorders, California
- Genre: Pop rock
- Length: 3:45
- Label: Liberty/Magic
- Songwriters: Robbie Patton & David Adelstein
- Producers: Christine McVie, Ken Caillat, Robbie Patton

"Don't Give it Up" is a 1981 song by English singer/songwriter Robbie Patton. It is Patton's first and only Top 40 hit on the Billboard Hot 100. "Don't Give it Up" reached #26 in the United States in 1981.

The song is co-produced by Fleetwood Mac producer Ken Caillat, Fleetwood Mac keyboardist Christine McVie, and Patton. Fleetwood Mac members Bob Weston, Christine McVie, Bob Welch, and Lindsey Buckingham are featured as performers. Also, Colin Allen, who co-wrote Fleetwood Mac's "Wish You Were Here" is featured on the track as well.

On November 19, 1981, Bob Welch invited Robbie Patton, Christine McVie, Joey Brasler, David Adelstein, Alvin Taylor, and Robin Sylvester to perform the track during his concert in The Roxy Theatre in California. The live performance was later released on Welch's "Live at The Roxy" album in 2004.

== Personnel ==
- Robbie Patton – lead vocals, keyboards
- Christine McVie – keyboards, backing vocals
- David Adelstein – keyboards, synthesizer, backing vocals
- Colin Allen – drums, percussion
- Lindsey Buckingham – guitars
- Bob Weston – guitars
- Tim Weston – guitars
- Robin Sylvester – bass, backing vocals
- Bob Welch – backing vocals
- John Clark – oboe, piccolo, saxophone
- Ernie Erhardt – cello
- Tony Selvage – violin

== Charts ==
The song spent a total of 13 weeks on the Billboard Hot 100, and peaked at number 26.

Chart (1981)	Peak position
U.S. Billboard Hot 100	26
U.S. Billboard Adult Contemporary	41
