= Bob Welch (album) =

Studio album by Bob Welch
- Released: October 1981
- Recorded: 1981
- Studios: Sound City Studios Los Angeles; Location Recording Service Burbank, CA
- Genre: Rock
- Length: 33:14
- Label: RCA
- Producer: Michael Verdick

Bob Welch chronology
Man Overboard (1980)	Bob Welch (1981)	Eye Contact (1983)

Singles from Welch
- 1. "Two To Do" Released: November 1981; 2. "Remember" Released: May 1982

Professional ratings
Review scores
Source	Rating
Allmusic	3/5 stars

Bob Welch is the fifth solo album from the ex-Fleetwood Mac guitarist of the same name, released in 1981. It was his first for RCA Records. The album has since been reissued on CD in 1991 by BMG Japan, and in 2012 by Wounded Bird Records.

When asked in an interview to promote his Bob Welch Looks at Bop album, Welch was asked if there were any songs he disliked recording, and Welch described one from this album.

"The easy part is a song that I didn't really want to record, but did anyway, and tried to do my best on it, and then the writer 'kicked me in the teeth' because I had changed a couple of things in the lyrics to make the song more singable for me. The song was "Bend Me Shape Me", on my 1st RCA album, which was a political nightmare to record from start to finish. I was trying to please everybody, and wound up pleasing nobody!"

"Two to Do", the album's first single, reached number seven on the Billboard Bubbling Under chart, an extension to the Hot 100. "It's What Ya Don't Say" became a minor hit peaking on the Mainstream Rock charts at number 45. The album peaked just outside the Billboard 200 at number 201. It also reached number 32 on the Billboard Rock Albums chart.

== Critical reception ==
Billboard said that the album was "filled with the kind of bouncy, memorable hooks and melody that characterized his other albums." They also believed that "Two to Do" was one of the album's highlights. Record World wrote that the Welch "combines cool vocals and some hot guitar on an LP that straddles the AOR/pop fence with style." Cashbox characterized the album as "a high-tech, '80s mainstream rock effort" with a "hot electric Gibson sound".

== Track listing ==
1. "Two to Do" (Michael Clark) – 3:33
2. "Remember" (Bryan Adams, Jim Vallance) – 3:53
3. "Bend Me, Shape Me" (Larry Weiss, Scott English) – 3:01
4. "That's What We Said" (Bob Welch) – 3:07
5. "If You Think You Know How to Love Me" (Mike Chapman, Nicky Chinn) – 3:55
6. "It's What Ya Don't Say" (Steve Diamond) – 2:45
7. "You Can't Do That" (Welch) – 2:36
8. "Secrets" (Welch) – 3:09
9. "Imaginary Fool" (Welch) – 3:22
10. "To My Heart Again" (Tom Snow) – 3:04
11. "Drive" (Welch) – 0:49

== Personnel ==
=== Musicians ===
- Bob Welch – vocals, guitar
- Tom Kelly – backing vocals
- Joey Brasler – guitar
- Brad Palmer – bass guitar
- Dave Rodriguez – bass guitar
- David Adelstein – keyboards, synthesizer
- Alvin Taylor – drums
- Robbie Patton – percussion

=== Technical ===
- Michael Verdick – producer, engineer
- Paul Lani – assistant engineer
- Tori Swenson – assistant engineer
- Leon Lecash – cover photography
- Sam Emerson – sleeve photography
- Larry Vigon – artwork
