= Precious Love =

Precious Love may refer to:

- Precious Love (Jody Watley song) a song by Jody Watley
- Precious Love (The Onset song) a song by The Onset
- Precious Love (Bob Welch song) a song by Bob Welch
- "Precious Love", a song by Chris Tomlin from the album Always, 2022
- "Precious Love", a song by Cubic U (Hikaru Utada) from the album Precious
- "Precious Love", a song by Twice from the EP Page Two

== See also ==
- Your Precious Love a song by Marvin Gaye and Tammi Terrell
