= Bob Welch Looks at Bop =

Studio album by Bob Welch
- Released: September 10, 1999
- Recorded: 1999
- Genre: Rock
- Length: 43:23
- Label: Cigar Music
- Producer: Allun Brun

Bob Welch chronology
Greatest Hits (1994)	Bob Welch Looks at Bop (1999)	His Fleetwood Mac Years & Beyond (2003)

Bob Welch Looks at Bop is the seventh solo studio album by former Fleetwood Mac member Bob Welch. After a 16-year self-imposed retirement, it was his first new recording since Eye Contact was released in 1983. Welch is the only musician credited on the album (except for one backing vocal by Beegie Adair), but he has stated in an interview that there were others involved by way of "modern technology". The cover states that this is his first studio album since 1977's French Kiss, which is not true since Welch released five follow-up albums after French Kiss. Welch would not record another album until his 2003 recording His Fleetwood Mac Years & Beyond.

The track "Hustler" was a rewrite of "Silver Heels" from the 1974 Fleetwood Mac album Heroes Are Hard to Find. Due to its explicit lyrical content it was not included on some pressings of the album.

== Track listing ==
All songs written by Bob Welch, except where noted.

1. "Bird" – 3:33
2. "My Funny Valentine / Milestones" (Lorenz Hart, Richard Rodgers / Miles Davis) – 3:55
3. "Telepathy" – 5:03
4. "Pretty Things" – 2:41
5. "So It Rains" – 3:51
6. "Live in Cherai" – 3:32
7. "Lush Life" (Billy Strayhorn) – 4:28
8. "E – Ticket To Fly" – 5:21
9. "Hustler" – 4:32
10. "I Got Rhythm" (George Gershwin, Ira Gershwin) – 3:34
11. "Moody's Mood for Love" (Dorothy Fields, Jimmy McHugh, James Moody) – 2:54

== Personnel ==
=== Musicians ===
- Bob Welch – vocals, guitar, bass, keyboards
- Beegie Adair – backing vocals (track 11)

=== Technical ===
- Allun Brun – producer
