= Hollywood Heartbeat =

- Genre: Music-television series
- Presented by: Bob Welch
- Country of origin: United States
- Original language: English

Original release
- Release: 1980 – 1981

Hollywood Heartbeat is a syndicated music video television show that ran in the United States from 1980 to 1981. The show was hosted by former Fleetwood Mac singer-songwriter-guitarist Bob Welch and was produced by Lawrence Smith and Richard Mann. Later episodes were hosted by Mackenzie Phillips. The show's theme was written and recorded by Carmine Appice, who included a reworked version on his eponymous album the following year.

Taking advantage of music videos being produced more commonly by record labels to promote their records, the show was a precursor to MTV, which launched the following year. Beyond the record label-produced music videos, original music videos focusing on the hot acts from the Los Angeles club scene were produced exclusively for the show. Musicians making some of their first televised appearances included Berlin, The Plimsouls, Toni Basil, Shandi, Paul Warren & Explorer, Gary Myrick and the Figures, Surf Punks, 20/20 and The GoGos.

Welch would do the wraparound content, frequently from the back of a convertible driving around the Sunset Strip and similar club areas at night. He would also conduct interviews with celebrities such as Stewart Copeland, Madame Wong, Dave Hlubek, John Densmore and Joan Jett.
