= Future Games (song) =

Song by Fleetwood Mac

from the album Future Games
- Recorded: 1971
- Genre: Soft rock, psychedelic rock, progressive rock
- Length: 8:18
- Label: Reprise
- Songwriter: Bob Welch
- Producer: Fleetwood Mac

"Future Games" is a song by British rock group Fleetwood Mac, written by Bob Welch, which first appeared as the title track on the band's 1971 album Future Games. He later recorded a rendition of the song for his solo album The Other One. In 2000, the song was featured in the movie Almost Famous. MGMT covered "Future Games" for the 2012 Fleetwood Mac tribute album, Just Tell Me That You Want Me: A Tribute to Fleetwood Mac.

== Background ==
Welch wrote the song on a two-track tape recorder while in Paris after his band Head West had split and before his tenure with Fleetwood Mac. He was sharing an apartment at the time with a romantic couple when he received a phone call from Judy Wong to join Fleetwood Mac and replace Jeremy Spencer. Welch said that the lyrics for "Future Games" reflected his "pretty insecure mood" he was in at the time.

When I wrote "Future Games", the Vietnam War was still quite strong, they had the riots at the Democratic Convention two years before, Nixon was at the White House, they were giving people eighty-year sentences in Texas for possession of one marijuana joint, and the FBI was wiretapping your grandmother.

— Bob Welch

"Future Games" was the first song that Welch recorded with Fleetwood Mac. The guitar playing on the song was split between Welch and Danny Kirwan, with Welch handling the primary guitar licks and Kirwan contributing some guitar fills between certain phrases. Welch's vocals were double tracked and treated with delay. Clifford Davis, who served as the band's manager at the time, said that they needed to "rely heavily on studio techniques to get Bob's voice over." The final song possesses a run-time exceeding eight minutes; Welch said that he was "thrilled" when "Future Games" was designated as the title of the album. The song also received some airplay on FM radio stations.

Fleetwood Mac played "Future Games" live on a few occasions during Welch's time with the band, including their accompanying tour for Future Games and their Live at the Record Plant performance on 15 December 1974 for a live-broadcast on KSAN-FM filmed in Sausalito, California. In January 2025, Rhino Records released a limited vinyl 2-disc set of the band's Live at the Record Plant broadcast, which included a live recording of "Future Games" from that performance. Once Lindsey Buckingham and Stevie Nicks replaced Welch, the song was dropped from Fleetwood Mac's setlists.

Welch cited his solo version of "Future Games", released on The Other One as one of two songs along with "Hypnotized" that had a significant emotional impact on him and said that this was despite "neither of those [being] love songs."

== Critical reception and legacy ==
Billboard highlighted the song's "excellent harmonies" in its review for the album. In their book, Fleetwood Mac: Rumours n' Fax, Roy Carr and Steve Clarke said that the song demonstrated Fleetwood Mac's ability to "build climax upon climax" with their "disciplined bouts of jamming." Writing for AllMusic, William Ruhlmann said that the song had Welch's "characteristic haunting melodies, and with pruning and better editing, it could have been a hit." The Guardian and Paste ranked the song number 24 and number 23 respectively on their lists of the 30 greatest Fleetwood Mac songs.

Cameron Crowe selected "Future Games" to appear in his semi-autobiographical movie Almost Famous during a scene where the lead guitarist of a fictional band gives a monologue to high-schoolers at a party. Alexis Petridis lamented that "Future Games" did not experience the same surge in popularity as Elton John's song "Tiny Dancer", which was also featured in the film. He said that lack of commercial success for "Future Games" following its inclusion on Almost Famous was a "pity" and that "its stoned, shimmering, melancholy fabulousness is ripe for rediscovery." The band MGMT recorded a nine minute cover of "Future Games" on the 2012 tribute album, Just Tell Me That You Want Me: A Tribute to Fleetwood Mac.

== Personnel ==
- Bob Welch – guitar, vocals
- Danny Kirwan – guitar
- Christine McVie – keyboards
- John McVie – bass guitar
- Mick Fleetwood – drums, percussion
