= Eye Contact (Bob Welch album) =

Studio album by Bob Welch
- Released: June 1983
- Recorded: 1983
- Studios: Cherokee Sound, Hollywood, California; Castle Sound, Los Angeles
- Genres: Rock, synth-pop, new wave
- Length: 32:20, 44:22 (CD re-issue)
- Label: RCA
- Producer: Jeff Baxter

Bob Welch chronology
Bob Welch (1981)	Eye Contact (1983)	The Best Of Bob Welch (1991)

Singles from Eye Contact
- 1. "S.O.S." Released: July 1983; 2. "Fever" Released: August 1983; 3. "I'll Dance Alone" Released: October 1983

Eye Contact is the sixth solo album by musician Bob Welch released in 1983 by RCA Records. His next solo album, Bob Welch Looks at Bop, was released 16 years later.

In their review of the single "Fever", Cashbox said that the song was "fleshed out nicely by a tingly rhythm track and top-notch backing vocals."

== Track listing ==
1. "American Girls" (Bob Welch, Steve Diamond) – 2:47
2. "S.O.S" (Welch, Jeff Baxter) – 2:54
3. "Bernadette" (Welch) – 2:55
4. "He's Really Got a Hold on Her" (Ronald Brooks, Gary Harrison, Daniel Keen) – 3:17
5. "Don't Let Me Touch You" (Welch, Diamond) – 2:53
6. "I'll Dance Alone" (Mark Holden, Peter Hamilton) – 4:00
7. "Fever" (Welch) – 3:10
8. "Stay" (Welch, Baxter) – 2:58
9. "Love on the Line" (Welch) – 3:47
10. "Can't Hold Your Love Back" (Welch) – 3:39

== Bonus tracks on 2012 Wounded Bird reissue ==
1. "I'll Dance Alone" (single version) – 3:34
2. "Fever" (single remix) – 2:59
3. "Fever" (12" version) – 5:29

== Personnel ==
=== Musicians ===
- Bob Welch – vocals, guitar
- Nathan East – bass
- Jeffrey Baxter – guitars, synthesizers
- Jim Ehinger – piano, synthesizers
- James S. King – synthesizers
- Jerry Peterson – saxophone
- Ed Greene – drums
- Tommy Funderburk – background vocals
- Carl Wilson – background vocals
- Al Jardine – background vocals
- Myrna Smith-Schilling – background vocals
- Paulette McWilliams – background vocals
- Van Redding – background vocals

== Technical ==
- Jeff Baxter – producer
- Leon Lecash – photography
