= Souliloquy =

Studio album by Dick Morrissey
- Released: 1986
- Genre: Jazz fusion
- Label: Coda Records
- Producer: Max Middleton

Souliloquy is an album recorded by Dick Morrissey in 1986. It was his second solo album for Coda.

== Track listing ==
1. "Clouds" (Sérgio Mendes)
2. "East Sunrise" (Nippy Noya, Max Middleton)
3. "Lord Mayo" (Traditional; arranged by Dick Morrissey)
4. "Blue Star Delhi (Max Middleton)
5. "Angel" (Bob Weston)
6. "Red Shoes" (Max Middleton)
7. "Soliloquy" (Max Middleton)

== Personnel ==
- Dick Morrissey - Tenor/soprano saxes
- Max Middleton - Keyboards
- Kuma Harada - Bass guitar
- Robert Ahwai - Guitar
- Steve Ferrone - Drums
- Danny Cummings - Percussion
- Bob Weston - Lead guitar on "Angel" and "Red Shoes"
- Lenny Zakatek - Vocal on "Angel"

== See also ==
- Dick Morrissey discography
