= Man Overboard (Bob Welch album) =

Studio album by Bob Welch
- Released: September 1980
- Recorded: 1980
- Studio: Capitol (Hollywood)
- Genre: Rock
- Length: 35:33
- Label: Capitol
- Producer: John Carter

Bob Welch chronology
The Other One (1979)	Man Overboard (1980)	Bob Welch (1981)

Singles from Man Overboard
- 1. "Don't Rush The Good Things" Released: September 1980

Professional ratings
Review scores
Source	Rating
Allmusic	3/5 stars

Man Overboard is the fourth solo album released in 1980 by Bob Welch, former guitarist and singer with rock band Fleetwood Mac. It was reissued as a 2-for-1 CD (the first half being the songs from The Other One) by Edsel Records in 1998. Although it is not currently in print, it was made available for download on iTunes in 2008.

== Track listing ==
All songs written by Bob Welch except where noted.

1. "Man Overboard" (Welch, John Carter) – 4:43
2. "Justine" – 4:09
3. "Nightmare" (Welch, Carter) – 3:24
4. "B666" – 5:17
5. "Don't Rush the Good Things" (Neil Gammack) – 3:40
6. "The Girl Can't Stop" – 3:14
7. "Jealous" – 2:32
8. "Fate Decides" – 3:02
9. "Reason" – 2:43
10. "Those Days Are Gone" – 2:50

== Personnel ==
=== Musicians ===
- Bob Welch – vocals, guitar
- Alan Bran – bass guitar
- David Adelstein – keyboards, synthesizer
- Alvin Taylor – drums
- Randy Meisner – vocals (tracks 8–9)
- Norton Buffalo – harmonica (track 5)
- Marty Jourard – keyboards (track 1), saxophone (track 6)
- Todd Sharp – guitar (track 3)
- Venetta Fields – vocals (tracks 6, 8)
- Paulette Brown – vocals (tracks 6, 8)
- Don Francisco – vocals (tracks 1–2, 6–10)
- Bunny Hill – vocals (track 8)
- Wendy Waldman – vocals (tracks 8–9)

=== Technical ===
- John Carter – producer
- David Cole – engineer
- Richard McKernan – assistant engineer
- Henry Marquez, Roy Kohara – artwork
