= Heroes Are Hard to Find =

Studio album by Fleetwood Mac
- Released: 13 September 1974
- Recorded: July 1974
- Studios: Angel City Sound, Los Angeles
- Genres: Rock; soft rock; pop
- Length: 39:26
- Label: Reprise
- Producers: Fleetwood Mac, Bob Hughes

Fleetwood Mac chronology
Mystery to Me (1973)	Heroes Are Hard to Find (1974)	Fleetwood Mac (1975)

Heroes Are Hard to Find is the ninth studio album by the British-American rock band Fleetwood Mac, released on 13 September 1974. This is the last album recorded with Bob Welch, who left the band at the end of 1974. It was the first Fleetwood Mac studio album recorded in the United States, in Los Angeles.

The album was recorded following a legal dispute with the band's longtime manager Clifford Davis over the use of the band's name and their copyright. Heroes Are Hard to Find peaked at No. 34 on the US Billboard 200, making it the band's highest charting album in that country at the time. The album received a delayed release in the United Kingdom due to an injunction obtained by Davis.

The band embarked on the Heroes Are Hard to Find Tour in North America to promote the album, which extended into December. Later that month, Welch left Fleetwood Mac and was replaced by Lindsey Buckingham and Stevie Nicks, who later recorded several multi-platinum albums with the band.

== Background ==
The album was recorded during a low point for the group, with Bob Weston's affair with drummer Mick Fleetwood's wife causing a temporary disbandment. This led to subsequent legal problems when their manager Clifford Davis organized a completely new lineup using the Fleetwood Mac name to fulfill their remaining tour dates.

Davis had not informed concert promoters that his assembled band did not include any members from previous lineups of Fleetwood Mac; several concert promoters cancelled these concerts once they learned this was the case. The performances that did proceed as planned were met with hostility and demands for refunds. Following a performance in Boise, Idaho, complaints were filed with the state's attorney general's office; fans had complained that none of the members featured on the promotional posters had performed that evening. John Wilkinson, who was recruited as the keyboardist to play these shows, said that "it wasn't a bad band, to tell you the truth. We performed those old Fleetwood Mac numbers quite well...it's just that none of the original Fleetwood Mac was there."

The band secured an injunction that prevented the fake Fleetwood Mac from performing and Davis also won an injunction that temporarily barred the lineup of Fleetwood, the McVies, and Welch from touring or releasing any new music. Christine McVie described this period as the "most depressing time" in the band's career. During this time, the band drove to a lawyer's office in London on a daily basis to discuss their legal options.

Welch convinced the band to relocate to America so they could be closer to their record label. Christine McVie was initially hesitant, later telling Q magazine that it was "a scary proposition", but she agreed to travel with the band to Los Angeles. John McVie commented that "obviously, L.A. was the place to go. The record company was here, and communication is easier in America. We had to get out of England 'cause we were going crazy'". The band sued Davis to recover their publishing rights and to secure the right to use the name Fleetwood Mac. They also sought financial reimbursement to compensate for the loss of time and revenue incurred from the litigation.

Through the help of concert promoter Bill Graham, the lineup of Fleetwood, the McVies, and Welch managed to convince Warner Brothers that they were the real Fleetwood Mac. They negotiated a new contract with Warner Brothers, which allowed the band to release and perform music under the name Fleetwood Mac. The legal dispute with Davis was eventually settled out of court.

Heroes Are Hard to Find was mixed at Angel City Sound in Los Angeles by Bob Hughes, who also served as a co-producer and engineer on the album. Heroes are Hard to Find was the first album that Fleetwood Mac recorded with one guitarist. Fleetwood called the album "a more sedate affair than our pervious albums with Bob, the result of spending too long in creative limbo." Welch recalled that the band "struggled with material because nobody at that point could really articulate a clear direction. We wanted to do modern, no cliché music and had many long philosophical discussions about what we should do."

== Release ==
In the United States, Heroes are Hard to Find was released by WEA in September 1974 and sold 150,000 copies within a few weeks. The album was set for release in the United Kingdom that autumn, with WEA pairing up with CBS Records to press and distribute the album. Davis issued a writ in court to prevent its release in the UK, arguing that he still maintained the copyright of McVie's and Welch's work after they had signed a five-year contract with Davis. He ordered an injunction preventing the sale of the album in the UK and sought reimbursement for copyright infringement.

Two weeks after the writ was issued, an interim injunction was secured, which was upheld three days later in the High Court of Justice by Justice Forbes in October 1974. WEA and CBS Records objected to this ruling and appealed the case on the grounds of unequal bargaining power between the band and Davis, the latter of whom had served as their manager and publisher at the time the publishing deals were signed. The Court of Appeal lifted the injunction that prevented the band's record company from releasing Heroes Are Hard to Find in the UK. Lord Denning, who served as Master of the Rolls, said that "as a matter of common fairness, it was not right that the strong should be allowed to push the weak to the wall."

In October 1974, the album reached No. 1 on the US Billboard FM Action chart, a special survey that ranked albums based on adds to playlists from progressive radio stations. The following month, Heroes Are Hard to Find peaked at No. 34 on the US Billboard 200, which at the time was the highest Billboard placing for any Fleetwood Mac album. Christine McVie recalled that the band was disappointed with the album's commercial performance and expected it to chart higher. They were also displeased with the attendance of the album's accompanying tour, which failed to exceed a quarter capacity in some instances. During the band's performance in Las Vegas, Christine McVie said that Welch "screamed" at John McVie over a supposed mistake he had made onstage. Welch left Fleetwood Mac after the conclusion of the tour and was on more amicable terms with the band at the time of his departure.

Bob Welch later re-recorded "Angel", "Bermuda Triangle" and "Silver Heels" for His Fleetwood Mac Years & Beyond (2003). A re-write of "Silver Heels" with explicit lyrics, titled "Hustler", appeared on Bob Welch Looks at Bop (1999).

== Cover art ==
The cover art was designed by Desmond Strobel and photographed by Herbie Worthington using a three-way mirror. It features a shirtless Mick Fleetwood with his chest puffed out and his three year-old daughter Amelia standing on his shoes. Worthington later supplied the cover art for Fleetwood Mac and Rumours. The lace underwear worn by Fleetwood was given to him by Sandra Vigon, who at the time was staying at Worthington's house.

== Reception ==
Professional ratings
Review scores
Source	Rating
AllMusic	3/5 stars
Christgau's Record Guide	B−
Rolling Stone	(positive)
Rolling Stone Album Guide	2/5 stars

Heroes are Hard to Find received mostly positive reviews upon its release. Cashbox called the album's arrangements "lush and beautiful" and felt that the lyrics were "enigmatic and haunting". Billboard commended the integration of string orchestration on the album and placed particular attention on the band's continued transition toward more commercial pop music "without losing the distinctive sound they have reached." Record World called Heroes are Hard to Find the band's "most commercial album" with a "special soft style" that was "perked up by some heavier flavor."

Rolling Stone believed that Heroes are Hard to Find "stacked up as a pleasant album", and singled out "Prove Your Love" as "exquisitely pretty" and "Come a Little Bit Closer" as "a gorgeous tune reminiscent of the Beach Boys". Robert Christgau criticized the band for succumbing to pop cliches of the early 1970s, specifically their use of a string synthesizer, pedal steel, and "half-assed horns". He dismissed Welch and McVie for sounding bored and "less than perfect" respectively and labeled Heroes are Hard to Find as their worst album to date.

Retrospective reviews have been mixed. Hal Horowitz of AllMusic complimenting the songwriting abilities of Welch and McVie. He also praised the album for being both "cohesive" and "diverse" and said that it was "a minor gem that retains its effortless pop charms." Mojo ranked the album second to last on its list ranking all Fleetwood Mac albums. They thought that the band sounded "tired" and "ready for the new-blood makeover that Stevie Nicks and Lindsey Buckingham would very soon provide."

== Track listing ==
Side one
No.	Title	Writer(s)	Lead vocals	Length
1.	"Heroes Are Hard to Find"	Christine McVie	C. McVie	3:35
2.	"Coming Home"	Bob Welch	Welch	3:55
3.	"Angel"	Welch	Welch	3:55
4.	"Bermuda Triangle"	Welch	Welch	4:08
5.	"Come a Little Bit Closer"	C. McVie	C. McVie	4:48

Side two
No.	Title	Writer(s)	Lead vocals	Length
1.	"She's Changing Me"	Welch	Welch	2:58
2.	"Bad Loser"	C. McVie	C. McVie	3:25
3.	"Silver Heels"	Welch	Welch	3:26
4.	"Prove Your Love"	C. McVie	C. McVie	3:57
5.	"Born Enchanter"	Welch	Welch	2:54
6.	"Safe Harbour"	Welch	Welch	2:32

2020 remaster bonus track
No.	Title	Writer(s)	Lead vocals	Length
12.	"Heroes Are Hard to Find" (single version)	C. McVie	C. McVie	2:47

== Personnel ==
Fleetwood Mac

- Bob Welch – guitars, vocals, vibraphone
- Christine McVie – keyboards, vocals, ARP String Ensemble
- John McVie – bass guitar
- Mick Fleetwood – drums, percussion

Additional personnel

- Sneaky Pete Kleinow – pedal steel guitar on "Come a Little Bit Closer"
- Nick DeCaro – string and horn arrangements

Production

- Fleetwood Mac – producers
- Bob Hughes – engineer, producer
- Doug Graves – engineer, assistant engineer
- Lee Herschberg – remastering
- Desmond Strobel – design

== Charts ==
1974 weekly chart performance for Heroes Are Hard to Find
Chart (1974)	Peak position
Canada Top Albums/CDs (RPM)	46
US Billboard 200	34

2024 weekly chart performance for Heroes Are Hard to Find
Chart (2024)	Peak position
Hungarian Physical Albums (MAHASZ)	12
