= Penguin (album) =

Studio album by Fleetwood Mac
- Released: March 1973
- Recorded: January 1973
- Studios: Rolling Stones Mobile Studio, Benifold, Hampshire; AIR Studios, London
- Genres: Rock; soft rock
- Length: 35:46
- Label: Reprise
- Producers: Fleetwood Mac & Martin Birch

Fleetwood Mac chronology
| Bare Trees (1972) | Penguin (1973) | Mystery to Me (1973) |

Singles from Penguin
- 1. "Remember Me" Released: May 1973 (US); 2. "Did You Ever Love Me" Released: June 1973

Penguin is the seventh studio album by British-American rock band Fleetwood Mac, released in March 1973. It was the first Fleetwood Mac album after the departure of Danny Kirwan, the first to feature Bob Weston and the only one to feature Dave Walker.

The penguin is the band mascot favoured by John McVie. His fascination with the birds originated when he lived near London Zoo during the early days of his marriage to Christine McVie. He was a member of the Zoological Society and would spend hours at the zoo studying and watching the penguins.

== Background ==
After Danny Kirwan was fired following an altercation with the other band members during the Bare Trees tour, the band added guitarist Bob Weston and vocalist Dave Walker (formerly of Savoy Brown and The Idle Race) in September 1972. Walker was already familiar with the members of Fleetwood Mac as Savoy Brown had shared the same bill with Fleetwood Mac on several occasions and Weston knew the band from his touring period with Long John Baldry. Fleetwood Mac also hired Savoy Brown's road manager, John Courage, around the same time that Weston and Walker joined the band. Fleetwood told Q magazine in 1990 that their music manager Clifford Davis suggested the addition of Walker as he wanted the band to have a frontman.

Rather than record Penguin in a London studio, they hired the Rolling Stones Mobile Studio and brought it to Hampshire to record the album within the domestic atmosphere of Benifold, their communal house. Walker commented in a January 1973 interview with New Musical Express that the band planned on beginning the album's recording process that same month. He expected the arrangement with the mobile recording studio to be conducive to spontaneity and more flexibility, saying that "if anyone has an idea it’s just a matter of getting out of bed and going downstairs and recording it."

Walker was featured on two tracks on Penguin, namely his own composition "The Derelict" and a cover of Junior Walker's hit "(I'm a) Road Runner" on which he also played harmonica solos. Walker said that his strained relationship with his wife distracted him from investing full focus on the recording process. He said that he spent time at a local pub during the sessions and would be summoned by the band once they were ready for him to participate. The Penguin album was mixed at AIR Studios in London, where additional overdubs also occurred. While at Air Studios, Peter Green stopped by the recording studio to record an additional guitar track on "Night Watch". Steve Nye, who at the time was serving as a tape op at Air Studios, played organ on the song.

The album's artwork was painted by Chris Moore and the gatefold photo was shot on location at Ludshott Common and Waggoners Wells in Hampshire, according to Dave Walker in an online Q&A interview.

The subsequent tour seemed to go well and Penguin was the highest charting Fleetwood Mac album in the US at the time, clawing its way into the Top 50. However, during the recording of their next album, Mystery to Me, it was mutually agreed that Walker's vocal style and attitude were unsuitable for Fleetwood Mac and by June 1973 he had left. Walker reflected that he "didn't do enough in Fleetwood Mac to warrant being in the band.

== Songs ==
"Remember Me" was lifted as the first single from in the United States. In 1981, Christine McVie performed the song during Bob Welch's concert at the Roxy Theatre. A recording from this concert appeared on the 2004 album Live from the Roxy. Welch said that "Bright Fire" indirectly related to the Vietnam War and the acts of violence that arose from the conflict. He included lyrical references to roses as a metaphor for its symbolism within the context of Christian iconography. "Dissatisfied", another song written by Christine McVie, was included as the B-side to "Remember Me". The band came to the decision to cover "I'm a Road Runner" while Walker was at a local pub, so they gave him a phone call and beckoned him to the recording studio to record his parts. Walker recalled that the session for "I'm a Road Runner" was completed quickly and believed that his vocals "did leave a lot to be desired."

"The Derelict" was regarded by composer Dave Walker as unfinished, "as there was no bass track and no real production." John McVie did not feature on the song and no backing vocals were used. "Revelation" was re-recorded by Welch for His Fleetwood Mac Years & Beyond in 2003. "Did You Ever Love Me" was released as a single in both the United Kingdom and the United States and is the only song in Fleetwood Mac's discography to feature steel drums. "Night Watch" includes a brief guitar contribution from Fleetwood Mac's founder Peter Green at the end and organ playing from Steve Nye. "Caught in the Rain", an instrumental, was the only track on a Fleetwood Mac record where Bob Weston received the sole writing credit.

== Critical reception ==
Professional ratings
Review scores
| Source | Rating |
|---|---|
| AllMusic | 2/5 stars |
| Christgau's Record Guide | B |
| The Daily Vault | B+ |

Contemporary reviews of Penguin were generally positive. Record World said that Penguin "may be the band's best album yet". They highlighted the album's "softer, more melodic sound", "expert" musicianship, and "strong vocals". Billboard believed that the album had several potential singles and predicted that the LP would receive substantial airplay on FM Radio. They also thought that Penguin was "possibly their best release in several years." Cashbox noted the change in musical direction that the band took on Penguin and singled out "I'm a Road Runner" as "a potential breakthrough single for the sextet." Tony Stewart of New Musical Express felt that the album solidified their status as a soft rock group and that Welch "push[ed] them into the rather inconspicuous position of being yet another band who sound like Crosby, Stills, Nash and Young." He thought that "Night Watch" was the "most impressive piece of writing" on the album and believed that Christine McVie also contributed strong material.

Retrospective reviews of the album were more mixed. Robert Christgau "loved" the band's cover of "I'm a Road Runner" and Christine McVie's "husky laments" but was less favorable about Welch's compositions. William Ruhlmann of AllMusic thought that the album demonstrated little of the band's blues-rock influences and that "Welch's hypnotic melodies and McVie's romantic sentiments" were instead more prominent. Mojo ranked the album 17th out of 20 on its list of Fleetwood Mac's studio albums.

After the release of Penguin, certain band members levied criticism against the album. Mick Fleetwood told Hit Parader in a 1977 interview that Penguin was one of his least favourite releases from the band and thought that it "didn't flow that well as a whole." In a 1982 interview with Sounds, Christine McVie expressed her belief that Penguin was the band's worst album up to that point. She was more complimentary of her own compositions on Penguin and showed interest in re-recording some of them.

== Track listing ==
Side one
| No. | Title | Writer(s) | Lead vocals | Length |
|---|---|---|---|---|
| 1. | "Remember Me" | Christine McVie | C. McVie | 2:41 |
| 2. | "Bright Fire" | Bob Welch | Welch | 4:32 |
| 3. | "Dissatisfied" | C. McVie | C. McVie | 3:43 |
| 4. | "(I'm a) Road Runner" | Brian Holland; Lamont Dozier; Edward Holland, Jr. | Dave Walker | 4:52 |

Side two
| No. | Title | Writer(s) | Lead vocals | Length |
|---|---|---|---|---|
| 5. | "The Derelict" | Walker | Walker | 2:43 |
| 6. | "Revelation" | Welch | Welch | 4:55 |
| 7. | "Did You Ever Love Me" | C. McVie; Welch | C. McVie (with Bob Weston) | 3:39 |
| 8. | "Night Watch" | Welch | Welch | 6:17 |
| 9. | "Caught in the Rain" | Weston | instrumental | 2:35 |

== Personnel ==
Fleetwood Mac

- Bob Welch – guitars (except on "Caught in the Rain"), lead vocals, backing vocals (except on "The Derelict"), bass guitar on "Revelation"
- Bob Weston – guitars, lead guitar on "Revelation", slide guitar on "Remember Me", banjo and harmonica on "The Derelict", harmony vocals on "Did You Ever Love Me", backing vocals on "Caught in the Rain")
- Christine McVie – keyboards, piano on "The Derelict", lead vocals, backing vocals (except on "The Derelict")
- Dave Walker – vocals, harmonica on "Road Runner"
- John McVie – bass guitar (except on "The Derelict", "Revelation", and "Caught in the Rain")
- Mick Fleetwood – drums, percussion (except on "Caught in the Rain")

Additional personnel

- Steve Nye – organ on "Night Watch"
- Ralph Richardson – steel drums on "Did You Ever Love Me"
- Russell Valdez – steel drums on "Did You Ever Love Me"
- Fred Totesant – steel drums on "Did You Ever Love Me"
- Peter Green – additional lead guitar on "Night Watch"

Production

- Producer: Fleetwood Mac and Martin Birch
- Engineer: Martin Birch
- Sleeve design: Modula / John Watkins (front cover) / Chris Moore
- Inside photo by Barry Wentzell
- Recorded in Hampshire on Rolling Stones Mobile Studio
- Mixed at AIR Studios, London

== Charts ==
1973 weekly chart performance for Penguin
| Chart (1973) | Peak position |
|---|---|
| Canada Top Albums/CDs (RPM) | 53 |
| US Billboard 200 | 49 |
