= Bare Trees =

Studio album by Fleetwood Mac
- Released: 6 March 1972
- Recorded: 1971–1972
- Studios: De Lane Lea, London (apart from track 10, recorded at Mrs Scarrott's home in Hampshire)
- Genres: Rock; pop
- Length: 36:58
- Label: Reprise
- Producer: Fleetwood Mac

Fleetwood Mac chronology
Greatest Hits (1971)	Bare Trees (1972)	Penguin (1973)

Singles from Bare Trees
- 1. "Sentimental Lady" / "Sunny Side of Heaven" Released: May 1972

Bare Trees is the sixth studio album by British-American rock band Fleetwood Mac, released in March 1972. It was their last album to feature Danny Kirwan, who was fired during the album's supporting tour. The album peaked at number 70 on the US Billboard 200 chart dated 3 June 1972.

In the wake of the band's later success with the Buckingham/Nicks line-up in the mid-1970s, Bare Trees returned to the US Billboard 200 chart at number 182 dated 6 September 1975. The album was certified platinum by the Recording Industry Association of America (RIAA) on 9 February 1988.

Mick Fleetwood was particularly impressed with Kirwan's contributions to the album, saying that "Danny had the chops with layering techniques, and the ability to know what's right and wrong in the studio".

== Background ==
"Child of Mine" alludes to Kirwan's biological father not having been part of his life (Kirwan was his stepfather's surname). "The Ghost" was later re-recorded by Bob Welch for His Fleetwood Mac Years and Beyond, Vol. 2 in 2006, but this version was only available on the digital edition. The flute noises on "The Ghost" were triggered from a mellotron played by Christine McVie. "Homeward Bound" alludes to Christine McVie's road weariness and desire "for a proper night's rest in her own bed", according to Fleetwood. "Sunny Side of Heaven" is an instrumental, which was later performed with Lindsey Buckingham on guitar for some shows in the mid-1970s.

"Bare Trees" shares a theme with both the album's cover photography by John McVie and the closing poem "Thoughts On a Grey Day." "Sentimental Lady" was released as a single, and was later re-recorded by Welch (with Mick Fleetwood, Christine McVie, and Buckingham backing him) for his solo album French Kiss. Welch recorded the song again for His Fleetwood Mac Years & Beyond in 2003. "Danny's Chant" features the use of wah-wah guitars. The track is largely an instrumental, although it does feature rhythmic, wordless vocals from Kirwan.

"Spare Me a Little of Your Love" became a staple of the band's live act through the mid 1970s, including tours with the Rumours era lineup. The song was also covered by Johnny Rivers on his studio album New Lovers and Old Friends in 1975. Jackie DeShannon recorded a version for her 1972 album Jackie although this did not make the final cut and was not released on her All the Love: The Lost Atlantic Recordings album. In his first memoir, Fleetwood identified "Spare Me a Little of Your Love" as one of his favourite songs of McVie's, saying that "the great thing about her songs is that she always finds such novel ways to say 'I love you'".

The lyrics for "Dust" were taken from the first two verses of a poem of the same title, written by Rupert Brooke in 1910. Unlike W. H. Davies, who received a credit for the words to "Dragonfly", Brooke was not credited.

The final track on the album, "Thoughts on a Grey Day", is not a Fleetwood Mac song but a monaural recorded poem written and read by an elderly woman, Mrs. Scarrott, who lived near the band's communal home, 'Benifold', in southern England. Bob Welch gave differing accounts on who recorded the poem. In a 1999 Q&A with The Penguin, he said that "the spoken thing Mick does about 'Trees so bare' was written, I think, by this sweet old lady that lived near Benifold ... Mick did an affectionate 'schtick' on her to close the album." In a different Q&A with The Penguin in 2003, Welch said that Mrs. Scarrott lived within walking distance of their communal home. According to Welch, Fleetwood suggested the idea of bringing a cassette tape recorder to her house so that she could recite one of her poems.

Five of the ten tracks, comprising the majority of the music featured on the album, were written by Kirwan. "Trinity", another Kirwan song recorded at the sessions, was subsequently released in 1992 on the 25 Years – The Chain box set in stereo. The 2020 remastered edition of Bare Trees from the 1969 to 1974 CD box set features the track in an alternate mono mix, alongside the US single mix of "Sentimental Lady", and a live recording of "Homeward Bound".

Once the album was completed, the master recordings were brought to New York but were summarily demagnetized and erased as they passed through an x-ray machine at the airport. The band then travelled to the Record Plant where they spent "a horrible and hectic few days" remixing the album.

== Critical reception ==
Professional ratings
Review scores
Source	Rating
AllMusic	4/5 stars
Christgau's Record Guide	B+
Rolling Stone	(favourable)

In their review of Bare Trees, Record World called the album a "worthwhile package" that improved on the band's "brand of rock and roll". Cashbox said that the album was another stunning example of tight rock and roll playing" and concluded that the album's final track "Thoughts on a Grey Day" would make listeners smile "even on an orange day.". Billboard said that Kirwan's vocals were "full of delightful little flourishes" and also thought that the rest of the band were "accomplished" players in their own right. The publication also labelled Kirwans's "Child of Mine", "Bare Trees", and "Danny's Chant" as "outstanding" tracks.

In his review for New Musical Express, Tony Stewart wrote that the album "retained much of the initial Mac appeal", which he attributed to the rhythm section from the band's earliest albums remaining intact. He also highlighted the musicianship of the band and the prevalence of the guitar, saying that the instrument was used in a tasteful manner rather than a showcase for "instrumental ego trips." With the exception of "Dust", he was generally complimentary of Kirwan's compositions; he singled out "Sunny Side of Heaven" as "a beauty in itself" and thought that the song was reminiscent of The Shadows. He also praised McVie's songwriting on the album and wished that her keyboards were more present in the mix. In a retrospective review, AllMusic called Bare Trees "the "first consistently strong album Fleetwood Mac ever recorded".

== Release and commercial performance ==
Bare Trees debuted at number 175 on US Billboard 200 chart dated 22 April 1972. The album reached its peak at number 70 on the chart dated 3 June 1972, after being on the chart for seven weeks. The album ultimately spent a total of 27 weeks on the chart. On 9 February 1988, the album was certified platinum by the Recording Industry Association of America (RIAA) for sales of over a million copies in the United States.

Following the release of Bare Trees, Fleetwood Mac embarked on a tour to promote the album. In an interview on 5 August 1972 with Disc magazine, McVie said that the band planned to promote the album in Europe following their summer tour in North America. She also expressed her opinion that the band were "happier than we've ever been before."

By the end of the summer, Kirwan had left the group. At the time of his departure, New Musical Express were told by the band's publicist that Kirwan "was happy to leave, because he wanted to do a solo album for some time." However, Fleetwood later stated that Kirwan was fired after his refusal to join the band on stage after a disagreement with Welch over guitar tunings. During the argument, Kirwan destroyed his Gibson Les Paul and several items in the dressing room. The band then performed the set without Kirwan, who observed their performance from offstage. Fleetwood mentioned that the band became more incensed after Kirwan offered critiques of the band's performance. When discussing the incident, Welch recalled that "the set seemed to drag on for ever. To do a whole set without Danny was tough, because all the band arrangements depended on him being there for a guitar part or a vocal part...I think we told the audience Danny was sick, which I guess he was in a way."

== Track listing ==
Side one
No.	Title	Writer(s)	Lead vocals	Length
1.	"Child of Mine"	Danny Kirwan	Kirwan	5:09
2.	"The Ghost"	Bob Welch	Welch	3:58
3.	"Homeward Bound"	Christine McVie	C. McVie	3:20
4.	"Sunny Side of Heaven"	Kirwan	instrumental	3:10

Side two
No.	Title	Writer(s)	Lead vocals	Length
5.	"Bare Trees"	Kirwan	Kirwan	5:02
6.	"Sentimental Lady"	Welch	Welch	4:35
7.	"Danny's Chant"	Kirwan	Kirwan	3:16
8.	"Spare Me a Little of Your Love"	C. McVie	C. McVie	3:44
9.	"Dust"	Kirwan	Kirwan	2:41
10.	"Thoughts on a Grey Day"	Mrs. Scarrott	Mrs. Scarrott	1:46

2020 Remastered bonus tracks
No.	Title	Writer(s)	Lead vocals	Length
11.	"Trinity" (Mono Version)	Kirwan	Kirwan	4:08
12.	"Sentimental Lady" (Single Version)	Welch	Welch	3:02
13.	"Homeward Bound" (Live)	C. McVie	C. McVie	6:51

== Personnel ==
Fleetwood Mac

- Danny Kirwan – guitar, vocals
- Bob Welch – guitar, vocals
- Christine McVie – keyboards, vocals
- John McVie – bass guitar
- Mick Fleetwood – drums, percussion

Additional personnel

- "Special thanks to Mrs Scarrott for her readings, recorded at her home in Hampshire."

Production

- Producer: Fleetwood Mac
- Engineer: Martin Birch
- Remix engineer: Bob Hughes
- Remastering: Lee Herschberg
- Cover photo by John McVie
- Recorded at DeLane Lea Music Centre
- Remixed at Record Plant Studios

== Charts ==
Chart (1972)	Peak position
Australian Kent Music Report	37
US Billboard 200	70

== Certifications ==
Region	Certification	Certified units/sales
United States (RIAA)	Platinum	1,000,000^{^}
^{^} Shipments figures based on certification alone.
