= Sentimental Lady =

1972 single by Fleetwood Mac

- Side A variant of the 1972 US single

Single by Fleetwood Mac

from the album Bare Trees
- B-side: "Sunny Side of Heaven"
- Released: May 1972
- Recorded: 1972
- Genre: Soft rock
- Length: 4:34 (album version); 3:03 (single version)
- Label: Reprise
- Songwriter: Bob Welch
- Producer: Fleetwood Mac

Fleetwood Mac singles chronology
"Sands of Time" (1971)	"Sentimental Lady" (1972)	"Remember Me" (1973)

Audio video
- "Sentimental Lady" on YouTube

"Sentimental Lady"

Single by Bob Welch

from the album French Kiss
- B-side: "Hot Love, Cold World"
- Released: September 1977
- Recorded: 1977
- Genre: Yacht rock
- Length: 2:58
- Label: Capitol
- Songwriter: Bob Welch
- Producers: Lindsey Buckingham and Christine McVie

Bob Welch singles chronology
"Sentimental Lady" (1977)	"Ebony Eyes" (1978)

Audio
- "Sentimental Lady" on YouTube

"Sentimental Lady" is a song written by Bob Welch. It was originally recorded by Fleetwood Mac on their 1972 album Bare Trees, and was later recorded by Welch on his debut solo album, French Kiss, in 1977. It is a romantic song, originally written for Welch's first wife. Welch recorded it again in 2003 for his album His Fleetwood Mac Years & Beyond.

== History and release ==
The original 1972 version of the song as heard on Fleetwood Mac's Bare Trees album clocked in at 4 minutes 34 seconds, with background vocals by Christine McVie. It had two verses, with a reprise of the first following the instrumental bridge.

A 1977 recording, the most well-known version of the song, was a solo hit for Welch when he recorded it for his first solo album, French Kiss, which was released in September 1977. The first single released from the album, "Sentimental Lady" reached the top 10 on both the U.S. Pop and Adult Contemporary charts.

Mick Fleetwood played the drums for the re-recording found on Welch's 1977 album. This version featured Christine McVie and Lindsey Buckingham as backing vocalists and producers, with Buckingham also handling the arrangement. The solo recording has multilayered guitars played by Buckingham who recorded the guitars at half speed. He then sped up the recording so that the guitars would sonically resemble a harpsichord/music box. Unlike the original, which had two verses, Welch's solo version only had one verse to cut it down to less than three minutes for the final radio cut. The solo version also contains counterpoint vocals arranged and sung by McVie.

== Lyrical composition ==
The original placeholder/dummy lyrics for the chorus before the full lyrics were written was, "my legs are sticks and my feet are stones." Welch told Songfacts.com: "The lyric was probably referencing my first wife Nancy."

The Fleetwood Mac version includes a verse that begins "Now you are here today, But easily you might just go away." It is omitted from Welch's solo version, which otherwise has the same lyrics. Welch recalled that his record company wanted the single to be under three minutes to be commercially viable, so Welch cut the second verse to fulfill that requirement.

Donald Brackett, in his 2007 book, Fleetwood Mac, 40 Years of Creative Chaos discussed Welch's lyrics in "Sentimental Lady" and his writing and performing style. He described the original version from the 1972 album Bare Trees as the best example of the group's move towards a new, softer and highly commercial style in the early 1970s. Brackett suggested that the essence of the lyrics and nature of the song are "almost too gentle" and described Welch's voice as like "crushed velvet", in that he believed the voice is simultaneously gentle and threatening in tone that maintained a balance between the emotions of hope and despair. He later said that "Welch had the unique ability to encapsulate in a single song the travails of personal intimacy as well as the larger social picture in which we all lived".

== Reception ==
Cash Box described the original recording on Bare Trees as being "a startling approach to balladry" with "smooth harmonies abound." Record World called it "a gentle, floating ballad" with "nice lyrics." Tony Stewart wrote in New Musical Express that the song's "intricate guitar work builds up into a wonderful piece of music." The Guardian commented that the "ultra-hooky" song "should have been a pop hit the first time around." In its review of the 1977 version found on French Kiss, Billboard called the song a "gentle, melodic ballad with sweet harmonies and standout acoustic guitars".

== Personnel ==
=== Fleetwood Mac version ===
- Bob Welch – lead vocals, guitar
- Danny Kirwan – guitar
- Christine McVie – keyboards, backing vocals
- John McVie – bass guitar
- Mick Fleetwood – drums

=== Bob Welch version ===
- Bob Welch – lead vocals, bass guitar
- Lindsey Buckingham – guitar, backing vocals
- Christine McVie – keyboards, backing vocals
- Mick Fleetwood – drums

== Chart performance ==
=== Weekly charts ===
Chart (1977–1978)	Peak position
Canada RPM Top Singles	3
Canada RPM Adult Contemporary	4
U.S. Billboard Hot 100	8
U.S. Billboard Easy Listening	10
U.S. Cash Box Top 100	4

=== Year-end charts ===
Chart (1977)	Rank
Canada	177

Chart (1978)	Rank
Canada	89
U.S. Billboard Hot 100	78
U.S. Cash Box	87
