= The Other One (Bob Welch album) =

Studio album by Bob Welch
- Released: November 1979
- Recorded: 1979
- Studio: Capitol (Hollywood)
- Genre: Rock
- Length: 38:49
- Label: Capitol
- Producer: John Carter

Bob Welch chronology
Three Hearts (1979)	The Other One (1979)	Man Overboard (1980)

Singles from The Other One
- 1. "Don't Let Me Fall" Released: January 1980

The Other One is the third solo album by American musician and former Fleetwood Mac guitarist Bob Welch. It peaked at #105 on the Billboard 200.

Unlike Welch's first two solo albums, it does not feature any contributions from members of Fleetwood Mac, relying instead on contemporaneous members of Welch's touring band for backing vocals and additional songwriting (although the majority of tracks are Welch's own). The track "Future Games" is a re-recording of a song first released on the Fleetwood Mac album of the same name in 1971.

The album was reissued as a 2-for-1 CD (the second half being the songs from the follow-up album Man Overboard) by Edsel Records in 1998.

== Critical reception ==
Professional ratings
Review scores
Source	Rating
AllMusic	1.5/5 stars

The Globe and Mail wrote that credit "should be given as much to the studio wizards as to Welch himself, for this is one of those high-gloss studio jobs, with every lick in place and haunted by the echoes of a million knob adjustments."

== Track listing ==
All songs written by Bob Welch, except as indicated.

1. "Rebel Rouser" – 4:37
2. "Love Came 2X" (Donny Francisco, Todd Sharp, Brad Palmer, David Adelstein) – 4:47
3. "Watch the Animals" – 4:05
4. "Straight Up" – 3:02
5. "Hideaway" (Sharp) – 2:30
6. "Future Games" – 3:28
7. "Oneonone" – 2:52
8. "Don't Let Me Fall" (Adelstein) – 3:20
9. "Spanish Dancers" – 5:01
10. "Old Man of 17" – 4:07

== Personnel ==
=== Musicians ===
- Bob Welch – vocals, lead guitar
- Todd Sharp – rhythm guitar
- Brad Palmer – bass guitar, vocals
- David Adelstein – keyboards, vocals
- Donny Francisco – drums, percussion, vocals
- Roger Voudouris – acoustic guitar on "Oneonone"

=== Technical ===
- John Carter – producer
- David Cole – engineer
- Randy Ezratty – engineer
- Liz Sowers – photography
