= Robbie Patton =

English singer-songwriter

Robbie Patton is an English singer-songwriter. His first major exposure came in 1979 when he was selected as the opening act for a Fleetwood Mac tour. Mac member Christine McVie went on to produce Patton's second and third albums, and played keyboards on them; Lindsey Buckingham played guitar on Patton's hit single, "Don't Give it Up", and Stevie Nicks sang on "Smiling Islands". Patton returned the favour by co-writing the hit "Hold Me", which appeared on Fleetwood Mac's 1982 album, Mirage. Patton wrote songs for Jonathan Cain and Santana later in the 1980s.

== Discography ==
=== Albums ===
- Do You Wanna Tonight (Liberty Records, 1979)
- Distant Shores (Liberty, 1981) US No. 162
- Orders from Headquarters (Atlantic Records, 1982)
- No Problem (Atlantic, 1984)

=== Singles ===
- "Don't Give it Up" (1981) U.S. No. 26, U.S. AC No. 41
- "Smiling Islands" (1983) US No. 52, U.S. AC No. 16
