= Ebony Eyes (Bob Welch song) =

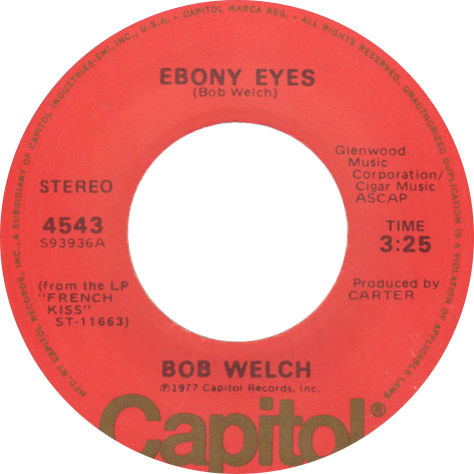
- One of side-A labels of the US single

Single by Bob Welch

from the album French Kiss
- B-side: "Outskirts"
- Released: January 1978
- Recorded: 1977
- Genre: Rock, disco
- Length: 3:25
- Label: Capitol
- Songwriter(s): Bob Welch
- Producer(s): Carter

Bob Welch singles chronology
"Sentimental Lady" (1977)	"Ebony Eyes" (1978)	"Hot Love, Cold World" (1978)

Audio
- "Ebony Eyes" on YouTube

"Ebony Eyes" is a song written and performed by Bob Welch. The song was the second single release and second hit song from his album French Kiss. Backing vocals are provided by Juice Newton.

The song reached number 14 on the U.S. Billboard Hot 100, and number 12 on the Cash Box Top 100. In Canada, "Ebony Eyes" peaked at number seven for two weeks. The single was an even bigger success in Australia, where it peaked at number two for four weeks.

== Chart performance ==
=== Weekly charts ===
Chart (1978)	Peak position
Australia (Kent Music Report)	2
Canada RPM Top Singles	7
New Zealand	9
U.S. Billboard Hot 100	14
U.S. Cash Box Top 100	12

=== Year-end charts ===
Chart (1978)	Rank
Australia (Kent Music Report)	21
Canada	72
New Zealand	49
U.S. Billboard Hot 100	96
U.S. Cash Box	92
