= Mystery to Me =

Studio album by Fleetwood Mac
- Released: 15 October 1973
- Recorded: Spring–Summer 1973
- Studios: Rolling Stones Mobile Studio at Benifold, Hampshire; mixed at Advision Studios, London
- Genres: Pop rock, soft rock, psychedelic rock
- Length: 47:49
- Label: Reprise
- Producers: Fleetwood Mac & Martin Birch

Fleetwood Mac chronology
| Penguin (1973) | Mystery to Me (1973) | Heroes Are Hard to Find (1974) |

Singles from Mystery to Me
- 1. "For Your Love" / "Hypnotized" Released: 15 October 1973

Mystery to Me is the eighth studio album by British-American rock band Fleetwood Mac, released on 15 October 1973. This was their last album to feature Bob Weston. Most of the songs were penned by guitarist/singer Bob Welch and keyboardist/singer Christine McVie, who steered the band toward pop rock music.

Mystery to Me sold moderately well, peaking at number 67 on the US Billboard 200 chart dated 22 December 1973. Despite not being a hit single, the song "Hypnotized" became an American FM radio staple for many years. In the wake of the Buckingham/Nicks-led line-up's success a few years later, the album returned on the US Billboard 200 chart dated 6 September 1975. It was certified gold by the Recording Industry Association of America (RIAA) on 9 November 1976.

== Background ==
Mystery to Me was Fleetwood Mac's last album recorded in England, the last to have two guitarists in the line-up until Behind the Mask and the last to be co-produced and/or engineered by Martin Birch. As with the preceding Penguin, the group recorded the album at Benifold, their communal house in Hampshire, with the Rolling Stones Mobile Studio. Mick Fleetwood commented in a 2003 interview with Modern Drummer that this recording situation proved to be cost-effective and gave the band more flexibility to record when they found it appropriate. The recording equipment was positioned inside two rooms on the first floor of the house, with cables leading into the front door of the mobile studio. Fleetwood described the outdoor acoustics as "just massive, like a concert hall, resounding off the trees and all through the grounds." Dave Walker was asked to leave during the sessions and did not feature in any capacity on the final release.

The album's name comes from a line in the chorus of "Emerald Eyes". "Hypnotized" was a minor US radio hit and continued to receive airplay on FM radio after Welch's departure. "Forever" is one of only two Fleetwood Mac tracks to feature Bob Weston as a composer and one of only a small handful to feature John McVie in this capacity. "Keep On Going" was written by Bob Welch but sung by Christine McVie because Welch decided her voice was better suited to the song. This was one of very few occasions when a member of Fleetwood Mac sang a song composed by another member.

"For Your Love" was originally recorded by The Yardbirds, and Fleetwood Mac's cover version replaced a Bob Welch song, "Good Things (Come to Those Who Wait)", on the album at a very late stage in production. Some albums came with a lyric inner sheet and outer sleeve still showing "Good Things" instead of "For Your Love", the latter being also released as a single. Although Fleetwood Mac's version of "Good Things" would not see release until 2020, it was later re-recorded by Welch with different lyrics and released as "Don't Wait Too Long" on his solo album Three Hearts.

Select tunes have been included in subsequent tours. Both "Why" and "Hypnotized" were played on the band's Fleetwood Mac Tour in 1975. "Just Crazy Love" was performed by Christine McVie on her solo tour in 1984. Early shows of the 2018–19 An Evening with Fleetwood Mac tour also featured "Hypnotized".

Welch would re-record five of his contributions to the album – "Emerald Eyes", "Hypnotized" and "Miles Away" appeared on His Fleetwood Mac Years & Beyond in 2003 and "The City" and "Somebody" were included on its follow-up volume in 2006, although the latter only featured on the digital edition.

== Critical reception ==
Professional ratings
Review scores
| Source | Rating |
|---|---|
| AllMusic | 3/5 stars |
| Classic Rock | 3.5/5 stars |
| Creem | B+ |
| The Daily Vault | A |
| Rolling Stone | (negative) |

In its review of the album, Billboard called Fleetwood Mac "one of the most melodic groups, shifting material perfectly to match the shifting personnel". They also highlighted "Just Crazy Love" and "The City" as "superb". Cashbox said that Mystery to Me was "another smash LP", adding that it "packs punch and prettiness side by side." The publication singled out the "intimate dimension" of Christine McVie's vocals and keyboards, the guitar playing of Weston, and the "impeccable" rhythm section for praise. Record World deemed the vocals and instrumentation as "free and breezy" and also felt that "Just Crazy Love," "Emerald Eyes" and "Somebody" were among the songs that resulted in a "super set" of material.

In a retrospective review, Classic Rock magazine stated that out of the six "largely forgotten" albums that Fleetwood Max released between 1970 and 1974, Mystery to Me is the best of them, as well as their oddest and most eclectic album of their career.

== Commercial performance ==
Mystery to Me debuted at number 156 on US Billboard Top LPs chart dated 17 November 1973. The album reached its peak at number 67 on the chart dated 22 December 1973, after being on the chart for six weeks. The album ultimately spent a total of 26 weeks on the chart. On 9 November 1976, the album was certified gold by the Recording Industry Association of America (RIAA) for sales of over 500,000 copies in the United States.

== Tour ==
During the band's 1973 American tour, Fleetwood Mac appeared on The Midnight Special. Fleetwood discovered during the tour that Bob Weston was having an affair with Mick Fleetwood's wife Jenny. Although Fleetwood tried to carry on playing with Weston, he told the McVies and Welch after a gig in Lincoln, Nebraska that he could no longer play with Weston in the line-up. John Courage, the band's road manager, fired Weston and put him on a plane back to the UK. With the tour cut short, the band also went back to England to break the news to their manager Clifford Davis. In the 17 November 1973 edition of Record World, the publication cited "internal differences" for the band's decision to end their tour; they also mentioned that Fleetwood Mac planned to resume their tour in January 1974. The band had planned to appear on the same bill as Canned Heat and War for a 24 November 1973 performance at the Las Vegas Convention Center. Davis later sent another group of musicians on the road as Fleetwood Mac, claiming that he owned the name.

== Track listing ==
Side one
| No. | Title | Writer(s) | Lead vocals | Length |
|---|---|---|---|---|
| 1. | "Emerald Eyes" | Bob Welch | Welch | 3:37 |
| 2. | "Believe Me" | Christine McVie | C. McVie | 4:12 |
| 3. | "Just Crazy Love" | C. McVie | C. McVie | 3:22 |
| 4. | "Hypnotized" | Welch | Welch | 4:48 |
| 5. | "Forever" | Bob Weston; John McVie; Welch | Welch | 4:04 |
| 6. | "Keep On Going" | Welch | C. McVie | 4:05 |

Side two
| No. | Title | Writer(s) | Lead vocals | Length |
|---|---|---|---|---|
| 1. | "The City" | Welch | Welch | 3:35 |
| 2. | "Miles Away" | Welch | Welch | 3:47 |
| 3. | "Somebody" | Welch | Welch | 5:00 |
| 4. | "The Way I Feel" | C. McVie | C. McVie | 2:43 |
| 5. | "For Your Love" | Graham Gouldman | Welch | 3:44 |
| 6. | "Why" | C. McVie | C. McVie | 4:55 |

2020 remaster bonus tracks
| No. | Title | Writer(s) | Lead vocals | Length |
|---|---|---|---|---|
| 13. | "For Your Love" (Mono promo edit) | G. Gouldman | Welch | 3:12 |
| 14. | "Good Things (Come to Those Who Wait)" | Welch | Welch | 3:24 |

== Personnel ==
Fleetwood Mac

- Bob Welch – electric guitar, acoustic guitar, bass guitar on "Keep on Going", lead and backing vocals
- Bob Weston – electric guitar, slide guitar, acoustic guitar, backing vocals
- Christine McVie – keyboards, lead and backing vocals
- John McVie – bass guitar
- Mick Fleetwood – drums, percussion

Additional personnel

- Richard Hewson – string arrangements

Production

- Fleetwood Mac – production
- Martin Birch – production, engineer
- Desmond Majekodunmi – assistant engineer
- Paul Hardiman – assistant engineer
- Clive Arrowsmith – photography
- Thomas Eccles – Liverpool Art Student – cover design, unpaid
- Mixed at Advision Studios, London

== Charts ==
1973-1974 weekly chart performance for Mystery to Me
| Chart (1973–1974) | Peak position |
|---|---|
| Canada Top Albums/CDs (RPM) | 82 |
| US Billboard 200 | 67 |

2023 weekly chart performance for Mystery to Me
| Chart (2023) | Peak position |
|---|---|
| Hungarian Physical Albums (MAHASZ) | 18 |

== Certification ==
| Region | Certification | Certified units/sales |
|---|---|---|
| United States (RIAA) | Gold | 500,000^{^} |
^{^} Shipments figures based on certification alone.
