= Precious Love (Bob Welch song) =

1979 single by Bob Welch

Single by Bob Welch

from the album Three Hearts
- B-side: "Something Strong"
- Released: January 1979
- Studio: Sunset Sound Recorders
- Genre: Rock, disco
- Length: 3:12 (7" version); 6:07 (12" version)
- Label: Capitol Records
- Songwriter(s): Bob Welch
- Producer(s): John Carter

Bob Welch singles chronology
"Hot Love, Cold World" (1978)	"Precious Love" (1979)	"Church" (1979)

"Precious Love" is a song by American singer-songwriter Bob Welch. It was released as a single in 1979 from his album Three Hearts.

The song is Welch's final Top 40 hit, peaking at #19 on the Billboard Hot 100. The song peaked at #17 on "Cash Box Top 100 Singles" chart during the week of April 28, 1979.

== Chart performance ==
Chart (1979)	Peak position
Australia (Kent Music Report)	37
Canada (RPM)	13
US Hot 100 (Billboard)	19
US Adult Contemporary (Billboard)	42
