= Bob Welch (musician) =

American musician (1945–2012)

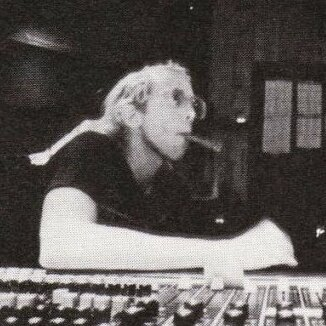
- Welch at the Record Plant in Sausalito, California, 1973

Background information
- Born: Robert Lawrence Welch Jr. August 31, 1945; Hollywood, California, U.S.
- Died: June 7, 2012 (aged 66) Antioch, Tennessee, U.S.
- Genre: Rock
- Occupations: Singer; musician; songwriter
- Instruments: Vocals; guitar; bass guitar
- Years active: 1964–2012
- Labels: Capitol; RCA; Curb; Edsel; Rhino; One-Way
- Formerly of: Seven Souls; Head West; Fleetwood Mac; Paris

Robert Lawrence Welch Jr. (August 31, 1945 – June 7, 2012) was an American guitarist, singer, and songwriter who was a member of Fleetwood Mac from 1971 to 1974. He had a successful solo career in the late 1970s. His singles included "Hot Love, Cold World", "Ebony Eyes", "Precious Love", "Hypnotized", and his signature song, "Sentimental Lady".

== Early life ==
Welch was born in Hollywood, California, into a show business family. His father, Robert L. Welch Sr., was a producer and screenwriter at Paramount Pictures, producing films starring Bob Hope and Bing Crosby. Welch Sr. produced the 25th Annual Academy Awards TV special in 1953 and The Thin Man TV series from 1958 to 1959. Bob's mother, Templeton Fox, was a singer and actress who worked with Orson Welles' Mercury Theatre in Chicago and appeared in TV and movies from 1962 to 1979.

Welch learned clarinet in his childhood, switching to guitar in his early teens. His interests were jazz, rhythm and blues, and rock music. He was accepted into Georgetown University, but instead moved to Paris, planning to attend the Sorbonne. Welch told People in a 1979 interview that, in Paris, "I mostly smoked hash with bearded guys five years older" and spent most of his time "sitting in the Deux Magots café". He returned to Southern California, where he briefly studied French at the University of California, Los Angeles, but did not complete a degree.

In 1964, Welch joined the Los Angeles-based vocal group The Seven Souls. The Seven Souls lost a battle of the bands competition, the prize being a contract with Epic Records, to Sly and the Family Stone. The Seven Souls' 1967 single "I'm No Stranger" and its B-side, "I Still Love You" made no impact at the time of its release, despite subsequent issue in France and Italy. The Seven Souls broke up in 1969.

Welch subsequently returned to Paris and started a trio, Head West, which was not a success beyond recording a drumbeat that would go on to be sampled repeatedly. He later told People that his time in Paris (1969-1971) was "living on rice and beans and sleeping on the floor."

== Fleetwood Mac ==
In 1971, Welch auditioned for Fleetwood Mac at Benifold, their retreat and communal home in Hampshire, England. The band had recently lost one of its front-line members, guitarist Jeremy Spencer, and were looking for a replacement. Judy Wong, a friend and part-time secretary for the band, recommended her high school friend Welch. The band had a few meetings with Welch and decided to hire him, despite not having previously played with him, after listening to some of his songs on tape. Welch was assigned rhythm guitar, backing up lead guitarist Danny Kirwan. Welch also moved in to Benifold.

The band's first album to feature Christine McVie and Welch, Future Games, was recorded at Advision Studios in London and released in September 1971, with the title track written by Welch. Six months later, in 1972, the band released Bare Trees, which was mostly recorded at De Lane Lea Studios in Wembley, London, and featured Welch's "Sentimental Lady". This song was a big hit for Welch five years later when he re-recorded it for his solo album French Kiss. Christine McVie and Lindsey Buckingham also sang on and produced the remake.

=== Line-up changes ===
The band recorded their next two albums Penguin and Mystery to Me at Benifold using mobile equipment hired from the Rolling Stones. Throughout this period, Fleetwood Mac often changed band members around the core of Mick Fleetwood, the McVies and Welch. Kirwan was replaced as a vocalist by ex-Savoy Brown lead singer Dave Walker, and as a lead guitarist by Bob Weston. Both Walker and Weston played on Penguin. Released in January 1973, the album reached No. 49 on the Billboard Top 200 album chart in the United States. This album contained Welch's songs "Bright Fire", "Revelation", and "Night Watch".

Mystery to Me contained Welch's song "Hypnotized", which earned significant FM radio airplay in the US. However, as a result of an aborted tour, Mystery to Me only reached No. 67 in the States.

=== 'Fake Mac' and Relocation to LA ===
By late 1973, internal stresses caused by a shifting line-up, touring, the deterioration of the McVies' marriage and an affair between Weston and Fleetwood's wife, Jenny Boyd, were debilitating to the band. Weston was sacked and the band quit a tour of the US.

The band's manager, Clifford Davis, refused to cancel the remaining 26 dates of the tour, fearing that this would destroy his reputation with bookers and promoters. In a letter to the remaining Fleetwood Mac members, he said he "had not slaved for years to be brought down by the whims of irresponsible musicians". He claimed that he owned the Fleetwood Mac name, and informed them of his plan to make the band into a new "star-quality, headlining act"—in effect firing them, but offering them jobs in the new band. Welch and the other band members did not take this seriously and ignored Davis's offer. Davis then set up a US tour with a new group of musicians—without Fleetwood Mac's consent—who were to be billed as "The New Fleetwood Mac". None of the new musicians had ever played with any previous incarnation of the band. Davis announced that Welch and John McVie had quit Fleetwood Mac, and that Fleetwood and Christine McVie would be joining the 'new' band at a later date. The original members of Fleetwood Mac obtained an injunction preventing the "fake Mac" from touring under their name, while Davis obtained an injunction preventing the original band from touring. The lawsuits resulting from the ultimately aborted tour put Fleetwood Mac out of commission for almost a year.

During this limbo, Welch stayed in Los Angeles and connected with entertainment attorneys. Welch believed the band was being neglected by Warner Bros.—the parent of their label, Reprise Records—and convinced the band to move to Los Angeles.

Instead of getting another manager, Fleetwood Mac decided to manage themselves. After the courts ruled that the "Fleetwood Mac" name belonged to Fleetwood and John McVie, the two band members set up their own band management company, Seedy Management.

=== Heroes Are Hard to Find and departure from Fleetwood Mac ===
In 1974, Welch was the only guitar player in the band. Warner Bros. made a new deal with Fleetwood Mac, releasing the album Heroes Are Hard to Find on Reprise in September 1974. The album became the band's first to reach the Top 40 in the United States, peaking at No. 34 on the Billboard chart. The subsequent tour would be Welch's last with Fleetwood Mac.

Welch was suffering with personal and professional issues: his marriage was failing, and he felt he had exhausted his creativity with the band. Later, he explained that he felt estranged from John and Christine McVie, yet close to Fleetwood; he asserted in 1974 that he was running the band. Welch resigned from Fleetwood Mac in December 1974 and was replaced by Lindsey Buckingham and Stevie Nicks.

Of the Fleetwood Mac albums on which Welch appeared, American album sales totaled 500,000 units shipped between 1971 and 2000 for Future Games; 1 million units of Bare Trees between 1972 and 1988; and 500,000 units of Mystery to Me between 1973 and 1976, when it was certified gold by the Recording Industry Association of America.

Welch's relationship with his former band remained amicable in the years following his departure. During the height of their respective popularity in the late 1970s, Welch would frequently open for Fleetwood Mac and he would sit in as lead vocalist on "Hypnotized". Mick Fleetwood managed Welch's career into the 1980s.

=== Lawsuit ===
By the 1990s, Welch's once diplomatic relationship with Fleetwood Mac had become acrimonious. In 1994, Welch sued Fleetwood, the McVies, band attorney Michael Shapiro and Warner Bros. Records for breach of contract related to underpayment of royalties. Previously, in 1978, Welch and the band had signed a contract with Warner Bros. agreeing to an equal share of all royalties from their Fleetwood Mac albums. Welch alleged that the members later made new deals with Warner Bros. for higher royalty rates, and neither Fleetwood nor the McVies had informed Welch, thus cheating him out of equal royalties. The lawsuit was settled in 1996.

=== Hall of Fame controversy and reconciliation ===
When Fleetwood Mac was inducted into the Rock and Roll Hall of Fame in 1998, original band members Peter Green, Jeremy Spencer, Mick Fleetwood, and John McVie were named to the Hall, as were later additions Danny Kirwan, Christine McVie, Lindsey Buckingham, and Stevie Nicks. Welch, who anchored the band for several years and five albums, was not. Welch felt the recent legal battle with the band soured the committee to include him. "My era was the bridge era," Welch told the Cleveland newspaper the Plain Dealer in 1998. "It was a transition. But it was an important period in the history of the band. Mick Fleetwood dedicated a whole chapter of his biography to my era of the band and credited me with 'saving Fleetwood Mac'. Now they want to write me out of the history of the group. It hurts... Mick and I co-managed the group for years. I'm the one who brought the band to Los Angeles from England, which put them in the position of hooking up with Lindsey and Stevie. I saw the band through a whole period where they barely survived, literally."

In a 2003 online question-and-answer session on the Fleetwood Mac fan site The Penguin, Welch revised his opinion about the exclusion. He had recently visited Fleetwood Mac backstage after a show, and he reconnected with Mick Fleetwood. Welch no longer blamed the band for his exclusion. He instead blamed the Hall's committee and its industry insiders (such as Ahmet Ertegun and Jann Wenner), stating they did not like his style of music. He still maintained that the lawsuit was a factor, as it prevented him from contacting Mick Fleetwood, and they were still estranged at the time of the induction.

== Rock trio and solo career ==
In 1975, Welch formed the short-lived hard rock power trio Paris with ex-Jethro Tull bassist Glenn Cornick and former Nazz drummer Thom Mooney. With a guitar-driven aesthetic compared by retrospective critics to Led Zeppelin, Paris released two commercially unsuccessful albums: Paris and Big Towne, 2061. Hunt Sales later replaced Mooney until the group disbanded.

In a 1979 interview with People, Welch said that the two Paris albums were "ill-conceived." The band's overhead and ensuing lack of commercial success drained Welch's finances, leaving him with only $8,000 in savings (equivalent to ~$35,000 in 2024) after its dissolution.

In September 1977, Welch released his first solo album, French Kiss, a mainstream pop collection featuring contributions from Fleetwood, Buckingham, and Christine McVie. The album was certified platinum by the RIAA, peaking at No. 12 on the Billboard chart in 1978. It yielded three hit singles: a revamped version of "Sentimental Lady" produced by Buckingham and McVie (#8), "Ebony Eyes" (#14; featuring Juice Newton on backing vocals) and "Hot Love, Cold World" (#31).

Welch followed up French Kiss with two albums in 1979. In February, Three Hearts, an album that replicated the rock/disco fusion of French Kiss, peaked at No. 20 (earning a RIAA gold certification) and spawned the hit "Precious Love" (#19), while the follow-up single "Church" (#73) also charted as his final U.S. Top 100 hit. His second effort that year, November's The Other One, contained his first solo recordings without any Fleetwood Mac members. Although the album reached No. 105 on the charts, none of its singles charted. Notable songs include "Rebel Rouser" and "Don't Let Me Fall". From 1980 to 1981, he hosted Hollywood Heartbeat, an early music video program. His subsequent solo albums into the early 1980s (Man Overboard, Bob Welch, and Eye Contact) were not successful; released approximately two years after "Church", Bob Welch only charted at No. 201.

In 1999, Welch released an experimental jazz/loop-based album, Bob Welch Looks at Bop. He followed this up in 2003 with His Fleetwood Mac Years and Beyond, which contained re-recordings of songs he originally performed with Fleetwood Mac, as well as some solo hits. In 2006, he released His Fleetwood Mac Years and Beyond 2, which mixed a half-dozen new compositions, along with a similar number of his Mac/solo remakes. He released more CDs with Fuel Records in 2008, 2010, and 2011.

Welch appeared as an avatar named BobWelch Magic in 2008, performing solo acoustic favorites and hits live for 30 minutes, in a show with Von Johin (musician/publisher Mike Lawson) and Cypress Rosewood (musician Tony Gerber) in the virtual world of Second Life, streaming live into the Gibson Island virtual stage from Lawson's studio.

== Recovery and second marriage ==
Following the release of Eye Contact (which failed to chart), Welch started partying with Guns N' Roses, who were rehearsing in his garage. He became addicted to cocaine and heroin and was hospitalized for detox in spring of 1985. Welch reflected on that era as "being a very bad boy, very decadent, very cynical, VERY stoned. It was not a good time."

The day he was released from detox, he was introduced to Wendy Armistead by Taryn Power (Tyrone Power's daughter) and Tony Sales at The Central (now The Viper Room). Welch and Armistead were married in December 1985 and moved to Phoenix, Arizona to maintain Welch's sobriety. Welch abstained from all illegal drugs for the rest of his life.

While in Phoenix, they formed a short-lived group called Avenue M. The group went on tour and recorded one song for a greatest hits compilation. Welch and Armistead later moved to Nashville, Tennessee and remained married until his death.

== Death and legacy ==
Three months before his death, Welch underwent spinal surgery. The procedure was unsuccessful and doctors told him his condition would not improve.

On June 7, 2012, around 6:00 a.m., Welch died by suicide, shooting himself in his Nashville home where his wife Wendy—for whom he left a nine-page suicide note and love letter—discovered his body. He was 66 years old.

Wendy died on November 28, 2016, from chronic obstructive pulmonary disease and heart disease, also aged 66.

An exhibit chronicling Welch's career opened at The Musicians Hall of Fame in Nashville on August 27, 2018. Despite the lawsuit 24 years earlier, Fleetwood wrote a tribute for the exhibit. Welch's estate has endowed a scholarship to support Belmont School of Music students.

== Pop culture ==
Bob Welch is mentioned throughout episode one of season eighteen of Family Guy, called "Yacht Rocky". The main character, Peter Griffin, finds out that Welch has died and takes a moment to lie down and stare at the ceiling while listening to "Sentimental Lady". This repeats several times in the episode as different characters lament Welch's death.

== Discography ==
=== Albums ===
Solo studio albums
Release date	Album	Chart (US)	Additional information
November 1977	French Kiss	12	Platinum
February 1979	Three Hearts	20	Gold
November 1979	The Other One	105	—
September 1980	Man Overboard	162	—
October 1981	Bob Welch	201	—
June 1983	Eye Contact	—	—
September 10, 1999	Bob Welch Looks at Bop	—	—
July 8, 2003	His Fleetwood Mac Years & Beyond	—	
March 28, 2006	His Fleetwood Mac Years and Beyond, Vol. 2	—	—
December 21, 2011	Sings the Best Songs Ever Written	—	—

Live and compilation albums
Release date	Album	Additional information
December 1991	The Best of Bob Welch	Unauthorized
1994	Greatest Hits	Unauthorized
August 10, 2004	Live from the Roxy	Recording from 1981
December 21, 2011	Live in Japan	Recording from 1979

=== Solo singles ===
Year	Title	Chart positions				
Year	Title	US	US AC	US Rock	CAN	AU
1977	"Sentimental Lady"	8	10	—	3	—
1978	"Ebony Eyes"	14	—	—	7	2
1978	"Hot Love, Cold World"	31	—	—	37	—
1979	"Precious Love"	19	42	—	13	37
1979	"Church"	73	—	—	85	—
1979	"3 Hearts"	—	—	—	—	—
1980	"Don't Let Me Fall"	—	—	—	—	—
1980	"The Girl Can't Stop"	—	—	—	—	—
1980	"Don't Rush The Good Things"	—	—	—	—	—
1981	"It's What Ya Don't Say"	—	—	45	—	—
1981	"Two To Do"	107	—	—	—	—
1982	"Remember"	—	—	—	—	—
1983	"S.O.S."	—	—	—	—	—
1983	"I'll Dance Alone"	—	—	—	—	—
2011	"Black Dog"	—	—	—	—	—

== Band work ==
Head West albums
Date	Album	Additional information
1970	Head West	Repackaged in 1973 & credited to "Bob Welch with Head West"

Fleetwood Mac albums
Release date	Album
September 3, 1971	Future Games
March 1972	Bare Trees
March 1973	Penguin
October 15, 1973	Mystery to Me
September 13, 1974	Heroes Are Hard to Find

Paris albums
Release date	Album	Additional information
January 1976	Paris	—
August 1976	Big Towne, 2061	—
