= French Kiss (Bob Welch album) =

Studio album by Bob Welch
- Released: 16 September 1977
- Recorded: 1977
- Studios: Sunset Sound, Village Recorders, Cherokee Studios and Producer's Workshop, Los Angeles
- Genres: Rock, power pop, disco
- Length: 35:45
- Label: Capitol
- Producers: Carter (except track 1, which was produced by Lindsey Buckingham and Christine McVie)

Bob Welch chronology
Big Towne, 2061 (1976)	French Kiss (1977)	Three Hearts (1979)

Singles from French Kiss
- 1. "Sentimental Lady" Released: September 1977; 2. "Ebony Eyes" Released: January 1978; 3. "Hot Love, Cold World" Released: May 1978

Professional ratings
Review scores
Source	Rating
Allmusic	4/5 stars
Christgau's Record Guide	C+

French Kiss is the debut solo studio album by former Fleetwood Mac singer and guitarist Bob Welch. The songs, with the exception of "Sentimental Lady", were intended for a projected third album by Welch's previous band, Paris. However, the group fell apart in 1977 before recording could begin. So instead, Welch used these songs for his debut solo album.

== History ==
The album produced three hit singles: "Ebony Eyes" (with backing vocals by Juice Newton) peaking at number 14 in the US; a revised version of Fleetwood Mac's "Sentimental Lady", peaking at number 8; and "Hot Love, Cold World", which peaked at number 31.

The album itself peaked at number 12 in the US and later went platinum. It is Welch's best-selling album.

The album features guest appearances by former Fleetwood Mac bandmates Mick Fleetwood, Christine McVie and Welch's successor, Lindsey Buckingham.

== Track listing ==
All songs written by Bob Welch, with additional writers noted.

Side one
No.	Title	Writer(s)	Length
1.	"Sentimental Lady"		2:52
2.	"Easy to Fall"		3:31
3.	"Hot Love, Cold World"	John Henning	3:39
4.	"Mystery Train"		3:07
5.	"Lose My Heart"		1:55
6.	"Outskirts"	John Carter	3:19

Side two
No.	Title	Length
1.	"Ebony Eyes"	3:33
2.	"Lose Your..."	0:45
3.	"Carolene"	3:13
4.	"Dancin' Eyes"	3:20
5.	"Danchiva"	3:51
6.	"Lose Your Heart"	3:16

== Personnel ==
=== Musicians ===
- Bob Welch – vocals, guitar, bass guitar
- Alvin Taylor – drums (except "Sentimental Lady")
- Mick Fleetwood – drums on "Sentimental Lady"
- Christine McVie – background vocals on "Sentimental Lady", "Easy To Fall", and "Lose Your Heart"
- Lindsey Buckingham – guitar and background vocals on "Sentimental Lady"
- Gene Page – string arrangements
- Juice Newton – background vocals on "Ebony Eyes"

=== Technical ===
- John Carter – producer, all tracks except "Sentimental Lady"
- Lindsey Buckingham, Christine McVie – producer, "Sentimental Lady"
- Warren Dewy – engineer, all tracks except "Sentimental Lady"
- Richard Dashut, Ken Caillat – engineers, "Sentimental Lady"
- Art Sims – design
- Daniel Catherine – photography
- Olivier Ferrand – photography

== Charts ==
Chart (1977–78)	Peak position
Australia (Kent Music Report)	8
US Billboard 200	12
Canadian RPM Albums Chart	13

== Certifications ==
Region	Certification	Certified units/sales
United States (RIAA)	Platinum	1,000,000^{^}
^{^} Shipments figures based on certification alone.
