= Bob Weston (guitarist) =

British guitarist (1947–2012)

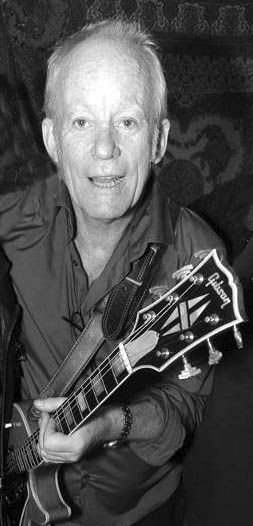
- Weston in 2011

Background information
- Born: Robert Joseph Weston; 1 November 1947; Plymouth, Devon, England
- Died: c. 3 January 2012 (aged 64) Brent Cross, London, England
- Genres: Blues, rock, pop
- Occupation: Musician
- Instrument: Guitar
- Years active: 1967–2011
- Formerly of: Fleetwood Mac (1972–73)
- Website: bobweston.com

Robert Joseph Weston (1 November 1947 – c. 3 January 2012) was a British rock guitarist, who was a member of Fleetwood Mac in the early 1970s. He also recorded and performed with a number of other musicians, including Graham Bond, Long John Baldry, Murray Head, Sandy Denny, and Danny Kirwan.

== Early life and career ==
Weston was born in Plymouth in the county of Devon on 1 November 1947 to a Royal Navy service family. In his childhood he learned to play the violin, switching to the guitar at the age of 12, being influenced by the music of American blues artists such as John Lee Hooker and Muddy Waters.

Moving to London from Devon in the mid-1960s (he retained a soft West Country burr to his voice for the rest of his life), in 1967 he became the lead-guitarist with a mod-beat band called The Kinetic, which was based at the time in Paris, playing as a support act to Jimi Hendrix and Chuck Berry gigs in France. The band signed to the French label Disques Vogue and released into the French market a long-player entitled Live Your Life (1967), with Weston being the band's principal songwriter, and two EP's, Live Your Life (1967), and Suddenly Tomorrow (1967). The Suddenly Tomorrow EP drew notices in the British music press to the act as having commercial potential, but no more recordings appeared, and it disbanded within a couple of years of its formation.

After The Kinetic had broken up, having returned to London from Paris, in April 1968 Weston joined the British blues heavy rock band Black Cat Bones, replacing Paul Kossoff as its lead-guitarist, and played with it until quitting the act at the end of the year. In the late 1960s and early 1970s, Weston worked as a session musician, performing and recording with a number of acts of the then in vogue British blues movement, including Graham Bond and Long John Baldry, and touring in continental Europe and America. In 1971 he was performing with the Southern Rock act Ashman Reynolds as its lead guitarist and songwriter on its long-player release Stop Off (1972).

== Fleetwood Mac ==
In 1972, Weston was a resident in Ealing in West London, when he joined the British blues rock band Fleetwood Mac as its co-lead guitarist alongside Bob Welch, as a replacement for the recently dropped Danny Kirwan. The band was aware of Weston's talent having seen him performing when Long John Baldry had regularly shared the same billing at venues with Fleetwood Mac, and when the guitar vacancy had arrived in Fleetwood Mac's line-up Weston was approached by the band with the offer of joining, which he agreed to in September.

In January 1973, Fleetwood Mac recorded the album Penguin. Weston played slide guitar on the song "Remember Me" and its harmonica and banjo tracks on "The Derelict". He also sang a duet with Christine McVie on the song "Did You Ever Love Me" and wrote the instrumental that closed the album, titled "Caught in the Rain". Later in 1973 the band recorded its next album titled Mystery to Me. Weston contributed more distinctive guitar work, such as the slide intro on the song "Why" and co-wrote the song "Forever" with Welch and John McVie. In retrospect, Weston felt that his contribution to the band's work in this period did not receive the formal recognition that it deserved.

During a tour of the United States in 1973 when the band were beginning to gel particularly well in its live performances, it emerged that Weston had started a clandestine romantic relationship with Mick Fleetwood's wife, Jenny Boyd. Fleetwood had got on well with Weston before this and tried to carry on with the arranged live performance schedule due to the legal and financial penalties that would be incurred by the band for a cancelled tour, but after a gig at Lincoln, Nebraska in October, he informed the band in Weston's absence that he was no longer willing to work with him. In consequence the band collectively agreed to drop Weston from the line-up, Weston being told about the decision by the act's tour manager, with the rest of the tour being abandoned by the remaining members. (It was this situation which gave rise to the "Bogus Fleetwood Mac" saga in which its manager Clifford Davis hired a new group of musicians, passed them off as Fleetwood Mac and sent them out to complete the tour).

Weston's involvement in the band had an effect beyond purely the musical, as his relationship with Boyd had contributed to Bob Welch's departure from its line-up in 1974. This led to a vacancy filled by Lindsey Buckingham and Stevie Nicks, who brought to the band a more mainstream rock sound, which would in the late 1970s-1980s lead to its greater popularity and commercial success.

== Later career ==
On his return to London in late 1973 from the aborted Fleetwood Mac tour, Weston was approached by George Harrison about a possible collaboration, but this did not develop into anything. Weston went on to record and tour in Europe and North America with Murray Head, playing on his second album Say It Ain't So (1975), for which he co-wrote the song "Silence Is a Strong Reply". In July 1975 he joined a newly formed band called the Steve Marriott All Stars, but when Marriott opted to play lead guitar himself, Weston departed in December of the same year, and for the remainder of his career worked primarily as a solo artist or as a session musician. In 1979 he played on Head's third album Between Us.

In 1979, Weston wrote and recorded a blues rock album titled Nightlight, which was produced by Alan Callan at Basing Street Studios and at Roundhouse Studio in London, and commercially released the following year through the French record label AZ International. However, with popular taste in music having moved on from the early 1970s, and British blues rock having become a small uncommercial niche market the record failed to enter the charts. A single, "Silver Arrow", was released, but also failed to sell well enough to chart.

In 1980, Weston recorded another blues rock album, Studio Picks, at Eel Pie Studios, produced again by Callan, featuring his own material and a cover of the Everly Brothers' "When Will I Be Loved". Mick Fleetwood played drums on one track, "Ford 44", the first time that he and Weston had worked together since the acrimony of 1973. The record was again released by AZ International in 1981, but like Nightlight it failed to enter the United Kingdom albums chart, and Weston's contract with the label was subsequently terminated. Also in 1981, Weston appeared as one of several guitarists in the music video for the Lindsey Buckingham solo hit "Trouble." He is seen in a line up of musicians, along with Bob Welch and Mick Fleetwood, accompanying Buckingham.

In 1985, Weston made a foray into mainstream pop music with a standalone single, "Desire", released by the French record company Underdog Records, but it also failed to chart and was his last solo commercial record.

With his career as a solo artist having failed to take off, Weston returned to working as a professional session musician in the 1980s, playing live on tour with a variety of acts, working in London studios, and intermittently in Europe and America. He played on Dick Morrissey's 1986 jazz album Souliloquy, writing one of its songs, and also worked in television music production. He was involved with the soundtrack for the French cinema film Diesel (1985), and acted as the musical director for the production of the British television film Palmer (1991).

In the 1990s, Weston retired from professional music for several years, returning to it at the end of the decade with a self-produced album called There's a Heaven (1999), which was engineered at Studio 125 in Burgess Hill and released independently.

In January 2008, Weston announced that he had started working on recording some new material at Markant Studios in the Netherlands. While working there he met Frank Baijens, a Dutch singer-songwriter who was recording his album Odd Man Out at the studio at the same time, and Weston played on one of the album's songs, "Where the Heart Belongs".

In his last years, Weston was resident in North West London, occasionally playing in impromptu sessions at The Duke of Hamilton public house and gigging with a local band called Mad Dog Bites.

== Death ==
Weston, who lived alone in his final years, was found dead by police officers in his flat in Brent Cross in London on 3 January 2012. They had gained entry to the property after his friends had reported concerns over unexpectedly not hearing from him for several days. He was reported to have died on an unknown date from the effects of a gastrointestinal haemorrhage caused by cirrhosis. He was 64 years old.

== Discography ==
=== Fleetwood Mac ===
- Penguin (Reprise, 1973)
- Mystery to Me (Reprise, 1973)

=== Solo albums ===
- Night Light (AZ International, 1980)
- Studio Picks (AZ International, 1981)
- There's a Heaven (Private pressing, 1999)

=== Solo 7-inch singles ===
- Silver Arrow (AZ International, 1980)
- Desire (Underdog Records, 1985)

=== 7" EPs with The Kinetic ===
- Live Your Life (Disques Vogue, 1967)
- Suddenly Tomorrow (Disques Vogue, 1967)

=== Appearances with other artists ===
- The Kinetic – Live Your Life (1967)
- Ashkan – In from the Cold (1969)
- Chimera – Chimera (1970 – Re-released 2002)
- Graham Bond – Bond in America (1971)
- Ashman Reynolds – Stop Off (1972)
- Long John Baldry – Everything Stops for Tea (1972)
- Dana Gillespie – Ain't Gonna Play No Second Fiddle (1974)
- Murray Head – Say It Ain't So (1975) (Co-wrote Silence Is a Strong Reply).
- Sandy Denny – Rendezvous (1977)
- Adrian Wagner – Instincts (1977)
- Mark Ashton – Solo (1979)
- Danny Kirwan – Hello There Big Boy! (1979)
- Murray Head – Between Us (1979)
- Robbie Patton – Distant Shores (1981)
- Dick Morrissey – Souliloquy (1986)
- Bob Welch and Friends – Live from the Roxy (2004)
- Frank Baijens – Odd Man Out (2008)
