= John McVie =

British bass guitarist (born 1945)

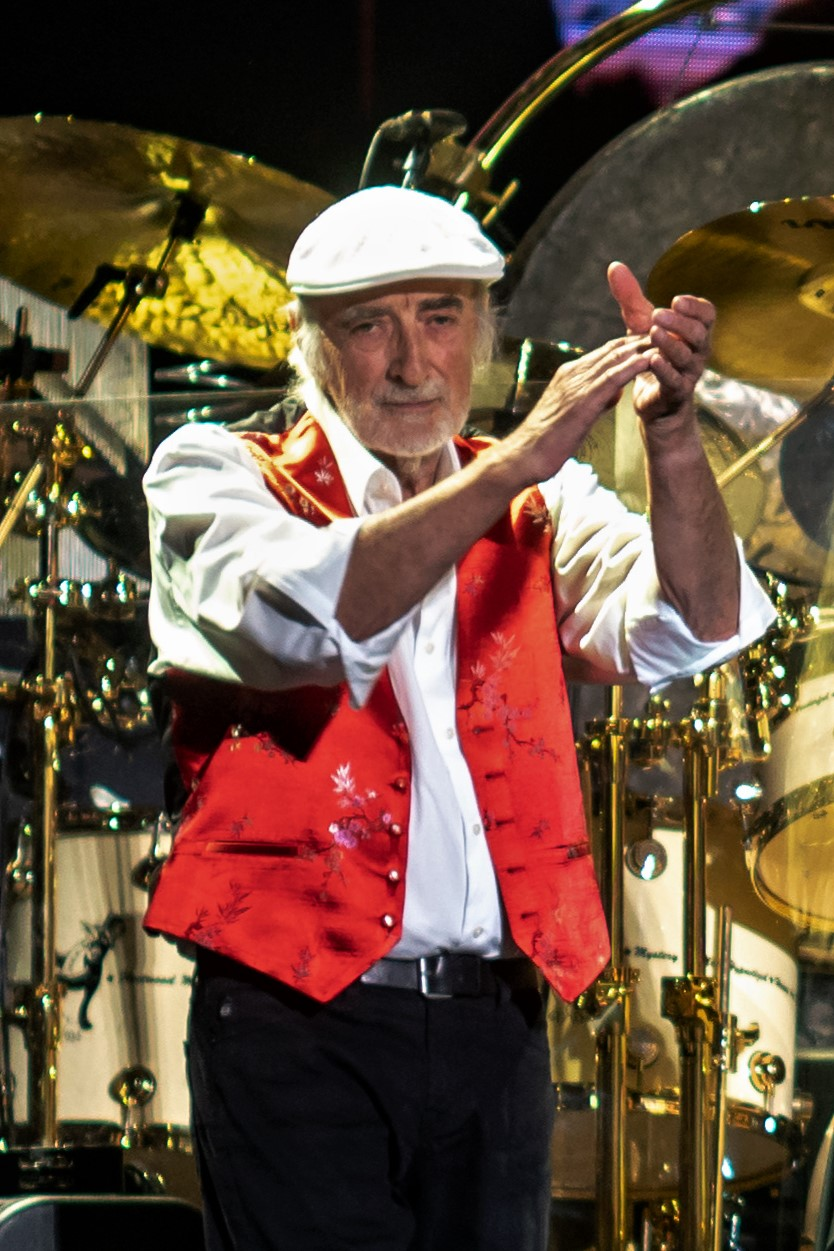
- McVie in 2018

Background information
- Born: John Graham McVie; 26 November 1945 (age 80); Ealing, Middlesex, England
- Genres: Rock; blues
- Occupation: Musician
- Instrument: Bass guitar
- Years active: 1963–present
- Labels: Reprise; Blue Horizon
- Formerly of: John Mayall & the Bluesbreakers; Fleetwood Mac
- Spouses: Christine Perfect (m. 1968; div. 1976); Julie Ann (m. 1978; died 2024)

John Graham McVie (/məkˈviː/; born 26 November 1945) is a British bass guitarist. He is best known as a member of the band Fleetwood Mac, and prior to that, the blues band John Mayall & the Bluesbreakers, from 1964 to 1967. His surname, combined with that of drummer Mick Fleetwood, was the source for the band's name "Fleetwood Mac".

He joined Fleetwood Mac shortly after its formation by guitarist Peter Green in 1967, replacing temporary bass guitarist Bob Brunning. McVie and Fleetwood are the only two members of the group to appear on every Fleetwood Mac release, and for over fifty years have been the group's last remaining original (or almost original in McVie's case) members.

In 1968, McVie married blues pianist and singer Christine Perfect, who became a member of Fleetwood Mac two years later. John and Christine McVie divorced in 1976, but continued working together professionally. During this time, the band recorded the album Rumours, a major commercial success with a title that referenced the turmoil in the band's romantic relationships.

McVie was inducted into the Rock and Roll Hall of Fame in 1998 as a member of Fleetwood Mac. McVie is listed at number 37 on Rolling Stone's list of the fifty greatest bassists of all time.

== Early life ==
John Graham McVie was born on 26 November 1945, in Ealing, West London, to Reg and Dorothy McVie and attended Walpole Grammar School. He had a sister who died when she was very young. McVie started playing the trumpet at an early age then, at age 14, he began playing the guitar in local bands, covering songs by the Shadows. He soon realised that his friends were learning lead guitar so he decided to play the bass guitar instead. Initially he just removed the top two (B and E) strings from his guitar to play the bass parts until his father bought him a pink Fender bass guitar, the same as that used by McVie's major early musical influence Jet Harris, the Shadows' bass player.

Soon after leaving school at 17, McVie trained for nine months to be a tax inspector. This coincided with the start of his musical career.

== Career ==
McVie's first experience making music with a group of like minds was in the back room of a house in Lammas Park Road, Ealing, with his long-term friends John Barnes and Peter Barnes who later went on to form a group called the Strangers performing Shadows covers.

McVie's first job as a bass player was in a band called the Krewsaders, formed by boys living in the same street as McVie in Ealing, West London. The Krewsaders played mainly at weddings and parties, covering songs from the Shadows.

=== John Mayall and the Bluesbreakers ===
Around the time of McVie's tenure as a tax inspector, John Mayall began forming a Chicago-style blues band, John Mayall and the Bluesbreakers. Initially Mayall wanted to recruit bass player Cliff Barton of the Cyril Davies All Stars for the rhythm section. Barton declined, however, but gave him McVie's phone number, urging Mayall to give McVie a chance . Mayall contacted McVie, auditioned him, and asked him to join. McVie accepted while still holding down his daytime job for a further nine months before becoming a musician full-time. Under Mayall's tutelage McVie, not having had any formal training in music, learned to play the blues mainly by listening to B.B. King and Willie Dixon records given to him by Mayall. McVie was the band's bassist for four and a half years. During that time he was fired and re-hired several times. One of his temporary replacements was Jack Bruce.

=== Peter Green and Mick Fleetwood ===
In 1966, a young Peter Green was asked to join Mayall's Bluesbreakers as the band's new lead guitar player, after Eric Clapton, the third guitarist with the band (after Bernie Watson and then Roger Dean), had left. Some time later, after the recording of A Hard Road, drummer Aynsley Dunbar was replaced by Mick Fleetwood. Green, McVie, and Fleetwood quickly forged a strong personal relationship, and when John Mayall gave Green some free studio time for his birthday, Green asked McVie and Fleetwood to join him for a recording session. Produced by Mike Vernon, they recorded three tracks together, "Curly", "Rubber Duck", and an instrumental called "Fleetwood Mac". Later the same year, after having been replaced by Mick Taylor in the Bluesbreakers, Green opted to form his own band, which he called "Fleetwood Mac" after his preferred rhythm section (Fleetwood and McVie). Mick Fleetwood immediately joined Green's new band, having been dismissed earlier from the Bluesbreakers for drunkenness. However, McVie initially was reluctant to join Fleetwood Mac, not wanting to leave the security and well-paid job in the Bluesbreakers, forcing Green to temporarily hire a bassist named Bob Brunning. A few weeks later McVie changed his mind, as he felt that The Bluesbreakers musical direction were shifting too much towards jazz, and he joined Fleetwood Mac in September 1967.

=== Fleetwood Mac ===
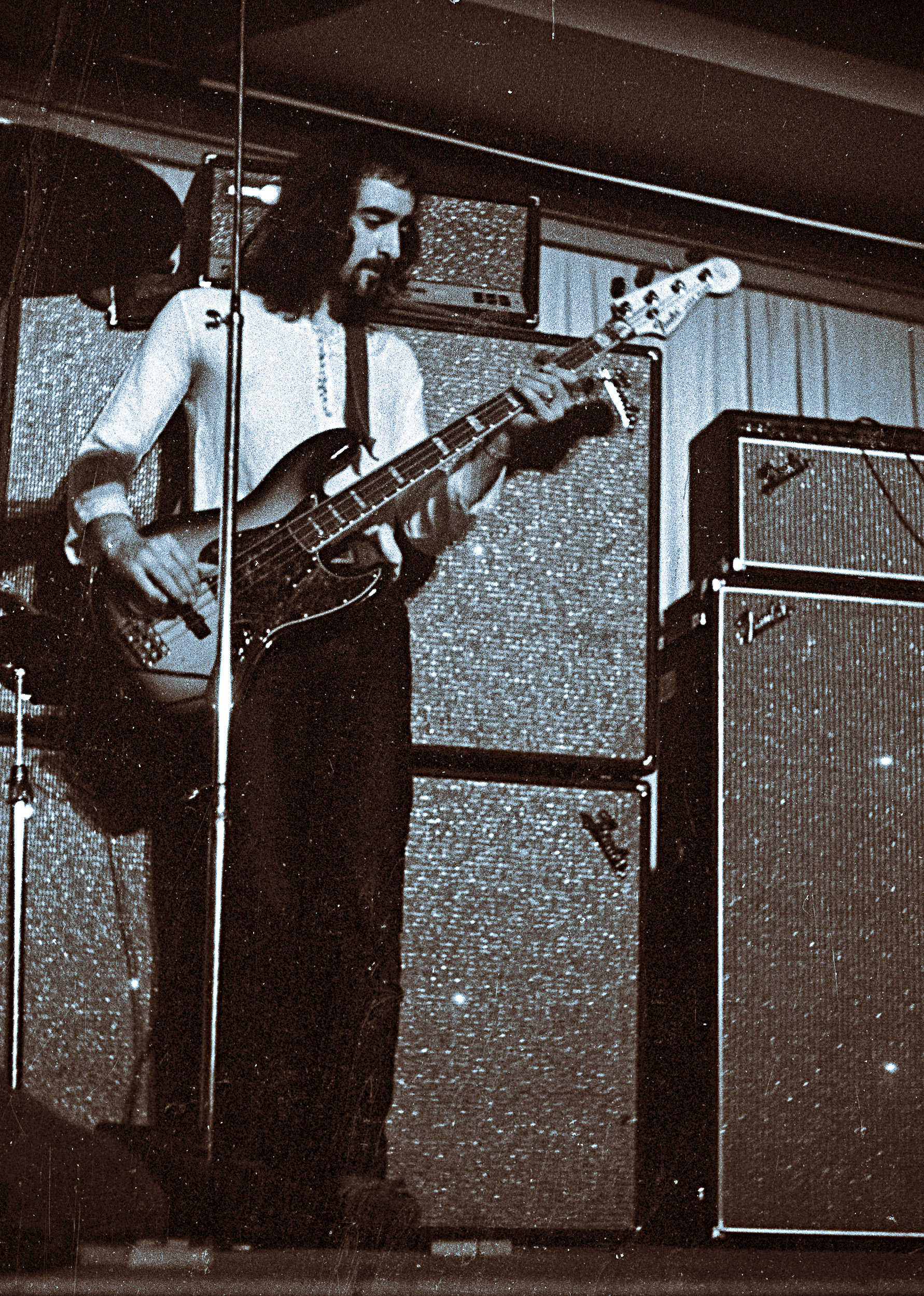
McVie with Fleetwood Mac, 18 March 1970

With McVie now in Fleetwood Mac, the band recorded its first album, Fleetwood Mac, in the following months. The album was released in February 1968, and became an immediate national hit, establishing Fleetwood Mac as a major part in the English Blues movement. Fleetwood Mac started playing live gigs in blues clubs and pubs throughout England, and became a household name in the national blues circuit. In the next three years, the band scored a string of hits in the UK and also enjoyed success in continental Europe.

=== Christine Perfect ===
While on tour, Fleetwood Mac would often share venues with fellow blues band Chicken Shack. It was on one such occasion that McVie met his future first wife, the lead singer and piano player of Chicken Shack, Christine Perfect. Following a brief romance of only two weeks, McVie and Perfect got married with Peter Green as best man. With the couple being unable to spend much time together because of the constant touring with their bands, Christine (now McVie) left Chicken Shack to become a housewife to spend more time with John. Following the departure of Peter Green from Fleetwood Mac in 1970, McVie successfully persuaded Christine to join him in Fleetwood Mac.

=== International success and personal life ===
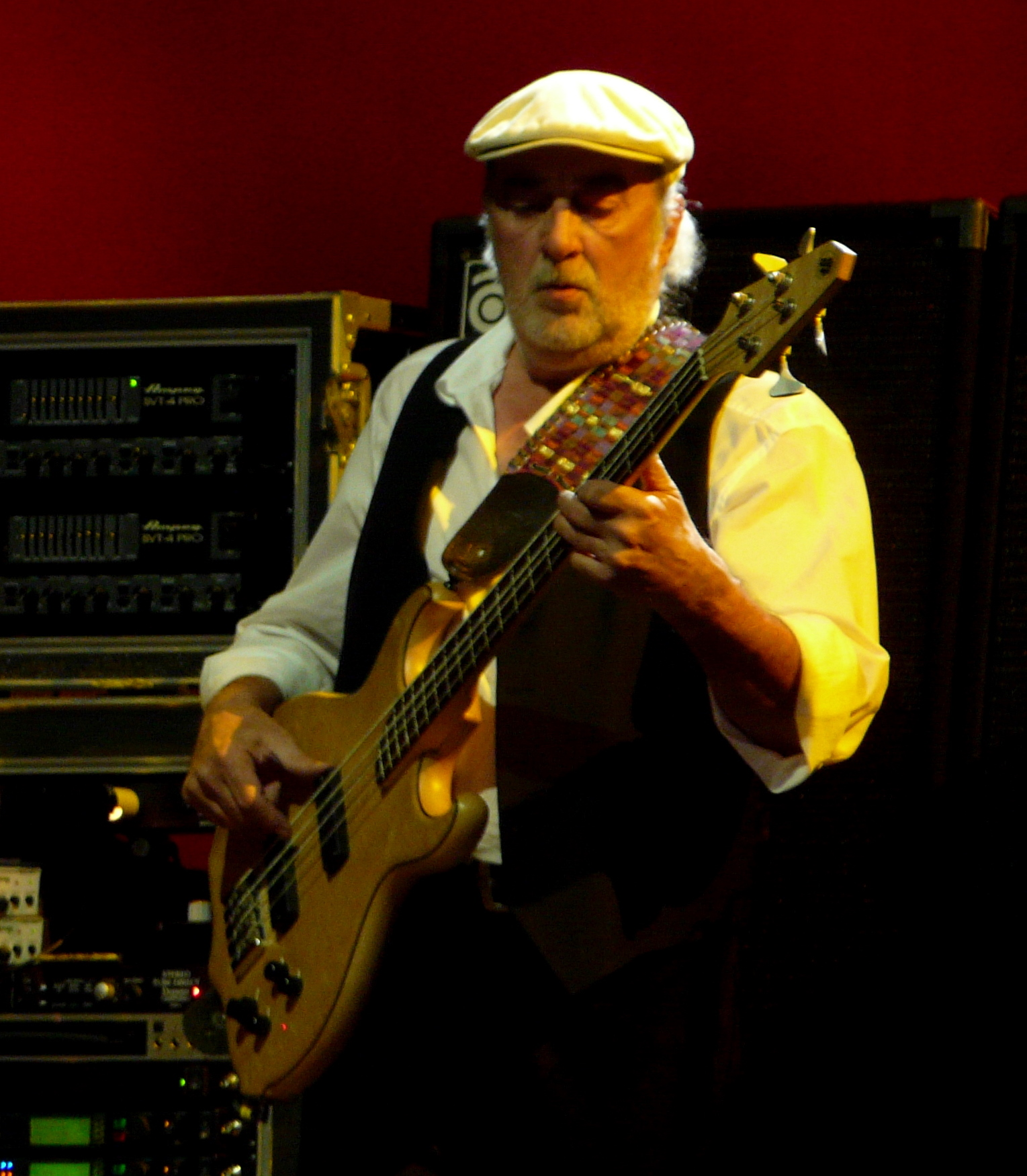
McVie live with Fleetwood Mac on 3 March 2009 in St. Paul, Minnesota

After 1970, Fleetwood Mac went through several different line-ups, which occasionally became the source of friction and unease within the band. In addition, frequent touring as well as his heavy drinking began to put some strain on his marriage to Christine. In 1974, the McVies, along with the other members of Fleetwood Mac, moved to Los Angeles, where they lived briefly with John Mayall. In 1975, Fleetwood Mac achieved worldwide success after recruiting American singer-songwriter duo Stevie Nicks and Lindsey Buckingham. On the heels of the band's success followed serious marital problems for the McVies, and in 1976, during the recording of Rumours, John and Christine McVie's marriage unravelled and the couple divorced the same year. As a way to put behind the hurt and final dissolution, several of Christine's songs on this album were about John McVie, particularly "Don't Stop". John McVie suggested the title Rumours because he felt that the songs functioned as journal and diary entries about each other.

In 1981, McVie agreed to go on the road with the Bluesbreakers again for their reunion tour with John Mayall, Mick Taylor, and Colin Allen. During 1982 the band toured America, Asia and Australia (McVie did not take part in the European Tour in 1983 and was replaced by Steve Thompson).

An alcohol-induced seizure in 1987 finally prompted McVie to stop drinking altogether and he has been sober ever since. In 1989, McVie's wife Julie Ann gave birth to their first child. In his spare time, McVie is a sailing enthusiast, and he nearly got lost at least once on a Pacific voyage.

In October 2013, McVie was diagnosed with colon cancer and began treatment. He continued to play with the band during their 2014 On With the Show tour following an improvement in his condition. In 2017, it was reported that McVie's colon cancer was completely cleared.

== Discography ==
=== With Fleetwood Mac ===
Year	Album	US	UK	Additional information
1968	Fleetwood Mac	198	4	Plays bass on all tracks except "Long Grey Mare"
1968	Mr. Wonderful	-	10	-
1969	Then Play On	192	6	credited for the instrumental "Searching For Madge"
1970	Kiln House	69	39	co-wrote "Station Man" and "Jewel Eyed Judy"
1971	Future Games	91	-	-
1972	Bare Trees	70	-	The cover photo was taken by McVie
1973	Penguin	49	-	Plays bass on all tracks except "Revelation" and "The Derelict"
1973	Mystery to Me	68	-	co-wrote "Forever"
1974	Heroes Are Hard to Find	34	-	-
1975	Fleetwood Mac	1	23	Appears on album cover with Mick Fleetwood
1977	Rumours	1	1	Co-Wrote "The Chain"
1979	Tusk	4	1	–
1980	Live	14	31	-
1982	Mirage	1	5	Backing vocals on Gypsy B-Side "Cool Water"
1987	Tango in the Night	7	1	-
1988	Greatest Hits	14	3	-
1990	Behind the Mask	18	1	-
1995	Time	-	47	-
1997	The Dance	1	15	featured on background vocals on "Say You Love Me"
2003	Say You Will	3	6	

=== With John Mayall's Bluesbreakers ===
Year	Album	US	UK	Additional information
1965	John Mayall Plays John Mayall	-	-	Live at Klooks Kleek
1966	Blues Breakers with Eric Clapton	-	6	-
1967	A Hard Road	-	10	-
1967	Crusade	-	8	-

=== Solo albums ===
Year	Album	US	UK	Additional information
1992	John McVie's "Gotta Band" with Lola Thomas	-	-	-

=== With Lindsey Buckingham and Christine McVie ===
Year	Album	U.S. Billboard 200	UK Albums Chart
2017	Lindsey Buckingham/Christine McVie	17	5

== Songwriting credits for Fleetwood Mac ==
Year	Song	Netherlands Singles Chart	U.S. Mainstream Rock
1969	"Searching For Madge" (John McVie)	-	-
1970 (1985)	"On We Jam" (McVie, Jeremy Spencer, Danny Kirwan, Peter Green, Mick Fleetwood)	-	-
1970	"Station Man" (McVie, Spencer, Kirwan)	-	-
1970	"Jewel Eyed Judy" (McVie, Fleetwood, Kirwan)	42	-
1971	"The Purple Dancer" (McVie, Kirwan, Fleetwood)	-	-
1971	"What A Shame" (McVie, Fleetwood, Kirwan, Christine McVie, Bob Welch)	-	-
1973	"Forever" (McVie, Bob Weston, Welch)	-	-
1975 (2004)	"Jam No.2" (McVie, Fleetwood, C. McVie, Lindsey Buckingham)	-	-
1977	"The Chain" (McVie, Fleetwood, Buckingham, Stevie Nicks, C. McVie)	-	30
1977 (2004)	"For Duster (The Blues)" (McVie, Fleetwood, Buckingham, C. McVie)	-	-
