= Fleetwood Mac discography =

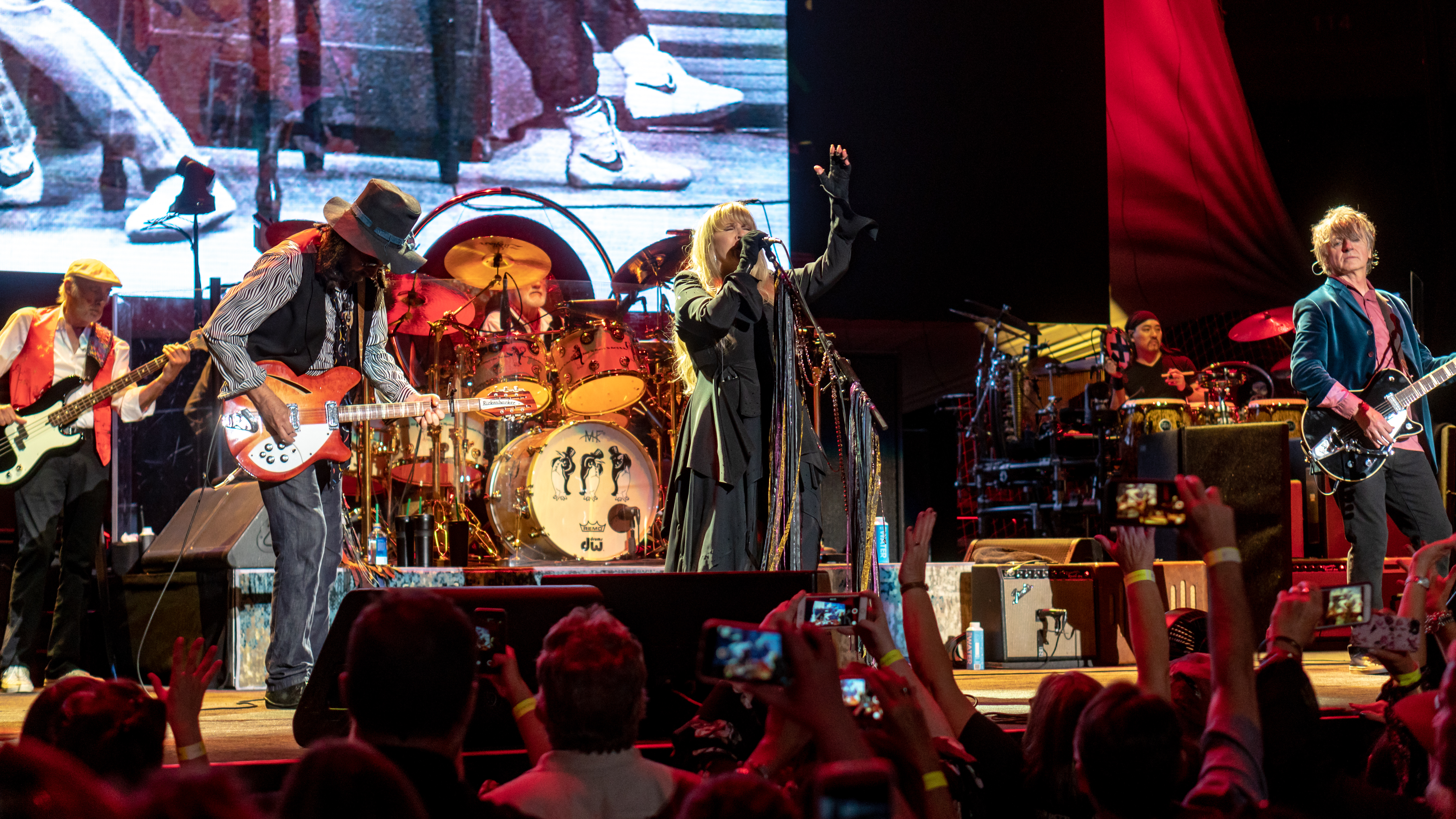
- Fleetwood Mac performing live in 2018
- Studio albums: 18
- Extended plays: 1
- Live albums: 10
- Compilation albums: 23
- Singles: 62
- Video albums: 11
- Music videos: 30
- Other charted songs: 8

The discography of British-American band Fleetwood Mac consists of 18 studio albums, 10 live albums, 23 compilation albums, one extended play and 62 singles. The band has sold over 120 million records worldwide, making them one of the best-selling music artists of all time.

The 1967–1969 era Blue Horizon albums (Fleetwood Mac, Mr. Wonderful, The Pious Bird of Good Omen, and Fleetwood Mac in Chicago) and the 1971 outtakes album The Original Fleetwood Mac have been remastered and reissued on CD, as have the 1975–1987 era Warner Bros. studio albums (Fleetwood Mac, Rumours, Tusk, Mirage, and Tango in the Night). In 2020, the remaining albums from 1969 to 1974 (Then Play On, Kiln House, Future Games, Bare Trees, Penguin, Mystery to Me, and Heroes are Hard to Find) were remastered and released in a CD box set, which also included a previously unreleased live concert from 15 December 1974.

In 2013, a deluxe edition of Rumours was released. The same year, Then Play On was remastered and reissued on CD. Reissues of Then Play On, Kiln House, Future Games and Bare Trees were released on vinyl, initially bundled with a 7″ single of "Oh Well, Parts I & II", then released separately in 2014. In 2015, a five-CD/one-DVD/two-LP deluxe edition, a three-CD expanded edition, plus a one-CD remaster of Tusk was released. In 2016, multiple remastered editions of Mirage were released. A 30th anniversary edition of Tango in the Night was released 31 March 2017.

In November 2017, the band announced a deluxe reissue of their 1975 self-titled album. The reissue featured a remastered version of the original album along with outtakes, alternative versions, and live recordings. The repackage was officially released worldwide on 19 January 2018.

== Albums ==
=== Studio albums ===
List of studio albums, with selected details, chart positions and certifications
Title	Album details	Peak chart positions										Certifications
Title	Album details	UK	US	AUS	CAN	FRA	GER	NL	NOR	NZ	SWE	Certifications
Fleetwood Mac (1968) (also known as Peter Green's Fleetwood Mac)	Released: February 1968; Label: Blue Horizon	4	198	—	—	—	—	—	3	—	—	
Mr. Wonderful	Released: 23 August 1968; Label: Blue Horizon	10	—	—	—	71	—	—	8	—	—	
Then Play On	Released: 19 September 1969; Label: Reprise	6	109	—	—	—	90	—	8	—	—	
Fleetwood Mac in Chicago (album by Fleetwood Mac with seven guest Chicago blues musicians)	Released: 5 December 1969; Label: Blue Horizon	—	118	—	—	—	—	—	—	—	—	
Kiln House	Released: 18 September 1970; Label: Reprise	39	69	26	67	—	—	—	—	—	—	
Future Games	Released: 3 September 1971; Label: Reprise	—	91	—	—	—	—	—	—	—	—	RIAA: Gold
Bare Trees	Released: March 1972; Label: Reprise	—	70	37	—	—	—	—	—	—	—	RIAA: Platinum
Penguin	Released: March 1973; Label: Reprise	—	49	—	53	—	—	—	—	—	—	
Mystery to Me	Released: 15 October 1973; Label: Reprise	—	67	—	82	—	—	—	—	—	—	RIAA: Gold
Heroes Are Hard to Find	Released: 13 September 1974; Label: Reprise	—	34	—	46	—	—	—	—	—	—	
Fleetwood Mac (1975) (also known as The White Album)	Released: 11 July 1975; Label: Reprise	23	1	3	2	—	47	86	—	4	—	ARIA: 4× Platinum; BPI: Gold; MC: Platinum; RIAA: 9× Platinum; RMNZ: 3× Platinum
Rumours	Released: 4 February 1977; Label: Warner Bros.	1	1	1	1	13	5	1	17	1	18	BPI: 17× Platinum; ARIA: 13× Platinum; BVMI: 5× Gold; IFPI: 2× Platinum; MC: 2× Diamond; RIAA: 2× Diamond (21× Platinum); RMNZ: 14× Platinum; SNEP: Platinum
Tusk	Released: 12 October 1979; Label: Warner Bros.	1	4	2	11	3	3	3	6	1	8	ARIA: 3× Platinum; BPI: Platinum; BVMI: Gold; RIAA: 2× Platinum; SNEP: Gold
Mirage	Released: 2 July 1982; Label: Warner Bros.	5	1	2	4	11	12	6	2	13	10	ARIA: 2× Platinum; BPI: Platinum; BVMI: Gold; MC: Platinum; RIAA: 2× Platinum; RMNZ: Platinum; SNEP: Gold
Tango in the Night	Released: 13 April 1987; Label: Warner Bros.	1	7	5	5	25	2	2	10	9	1	ARIA: 4× Platinum; BPI: 9× Platinum; BVMI: 2× Platinum; MC: 5× Platinum; RIAA: 3× Platinum
Behind the Mask	Released: 9 April 1990; Label: Warner Bros.	1	18	9	20	36	4	8	4	9	4	BPI: Platinum; ARIA: Gold; BVMI: Gold; RIAA: Gold
Time	Released: 9 October 1995; Label: Warner Bros.	47	—	144	—	—	92	59	—	—	—	
Say You Will	Released: 15 April 2003; Label: Reprise	6	3	24	8	113	10	28	23	7	8	BPI: Gold; MC: Gold; RIAA: Gold; RMNZ: Gold
"—" denotes items which were not released in that country or failed to chart.

=== Live albums ===
List of live albums, with selected details, chart positions and certifications
Title	Album details	Peak chart positions								Certifications
Title	Album details	UK	US	AUS	CAN	GER	NL	NZ	SWE	Certifications
Live	Released: 5 December 1980; Label: Warner Bros.	31	14	20	—	23	13	37	50	BPI: Gold; RIAA: Gold
Live in Boston (1970/1985)^{[A]}	Released: February 1985; Label: Shanghai	—	—	—	—	—	—	—	—	
Live at the Marquee 1967	Released: 4 May 1992; Label: Receiver	—	—	—	—	—	—	—	—	
Live at the BBC	Released: 1995; Label: Castle Communications	48	—	—	—	—	—	—	—	
The Dance	Released: 19 August 1997; Label: Reprise	15	1	4	19	20	4	12	39	BPI: Platinum; RIAA: 5× Platinum; ARIA: Platinum; MC: Platinum; RMNZ: Platinum
London Live '68	Released: 30 March 1998; Label: Eagle	—	—	—	—	—	—	—	—	
Shrine '69	Released: 1999; Label: Rykodisc	—	—	—	—	—	—	—	—	
Live in Boston (2003/2004)	Released: 15 June 2004; Label: Warner Reprise Video	—	84	—	—	—	—	—	—	
In Concert^{[B]}	Released: 4 March 2016; Label: Warner Bros.	—	—	—	—	—	—	—	—	
Rumours Live	Released: 8 September 2023; Label: Rhino, Warner	34	81	108	—	—	—	32	—	
Mirage Tour '82	Released: 20 September 2024; Label: Warner	—	—	—	—	55	—	—	—	

Notes

- A Live in Boston has been re-released several times: as Live in Boston: Remastered (3CD) in 1998; Boston Blues (2CD) in 2000; Live at the Boston Tea Party (4LP) in 2003; and as Boston (3CD) in 2013.
- B The tracks from In Concert were originally released on the deluxe 2015 remaster of Tusk.

=== Compilation albums ===
List of compilation albums, with selected details, chart positions and certifications
Title	Album details	Peak chart positions								Certifications
Title	Album details	UK	US	AUS	GER	NL	NOR	NZ	SWE	Certifications
English Rose	Released: December 1968; Label: Epic	—	184	—	—	—	—	—	—	
The Pious Bird of Good Omen	Released: 15 August 1969; Label: Blue Horizon	18	—	—	—	—	—	—	—	
Black Magic Woman	Released: 1971; Label: Columbia	—	143	—	—	—	—	—	—	
The Original Fleetwood Mac	Released: May 1971; Label: Blue Horizon	—	—	—	—	—	—	—	—	
Greatest Hits (1971)	Released: November 1971; Label: CBS	36	—	—	—	—	—	—	—	
Vintage Years	Released: March 1975; Label: Sire	67	138	—	—	—	—	—	—	
Albatross^{[A]}	Released: 1977; Label: Embassy	—	—	—	—	—	—	—	—	
Man of the World	Released: 1978; Label: CBS	—	—	—	—	—	—	—	—	
The Collection	Released: 9 June 1987; Label: Castle Communications	—	—	—	—	—	—	—	—	BPI: Silver
Greatest Hits (1988)	Released: 21 November 1988; Label: Warner Bros.	3	13	3	9	3	11	1	15	BPI: 3× Platinum; RIAA: 8× Platinum; ARIA: 9× Platinum; BVMI: Platinum; RMNZ: 11× Platinum; SNEP: 2× Gold
Original Fleetwood Mac: The Blues Years	Released: 1991; Label: Castle Communications	—	—	—	—	—	—	—	—	
25 Years – The Chain^{[B]}	Released: 23 November 1992; Label: Warner Bros.	9	—	2	86	95	—	1	—	BPI: Gold; ARIA: 2× Platinum; RMNZ: 2× Platinum
The Best of Fleetwood Mac	Released: 12 February 1996; Label: Columbia	—	—	—	—	—	—	9	—	BPI: Gold
The Vaudeville Years^{[D]}	Released: 13 October 1998; Label: Receiver	168	—	—	—	—	—	—	—	
The Complete Blue Horizon Sessions 1967–1969	Released: 1999; Label: Blue Horizon	—	—	—	—	—	—	—	—	
Show-Biz Blues^{[D]}	Released: 26 June 2001; Label: Receiver	—	—	—	—	—	—	—	—	
Jumping at Shadows: The Blues Years	Released: 22 April 2002; Label: Indigo	—	—	—	—	—	—	—	—	
The Very Best of Fleetwood Mac	Released: 12 October 2002; Label: Reprise	6	12	11	31	75	27	5	18	BPI: 7× Platinum; RIAA: 4× Platinum; ARIA: 8× Platinum; RMNZ: 7× Platinum
The Best of Peter Green's Fleetwood Mac	Released: 11 November 2002; Label: Columbia	129	—	—	—	—	—	—	—	BPI: Gold
Madison Blues^{[C]}	Released: 2003; Label: Shakedown	—	—	—	—	—	—	—	—	
Green Shadows	Released: 11 August 2003; Label: Metro	—	—	—	—	—	—	—	—	
The Essential Fleetwood Mac	Released: 2 June 2007; Label: Columbia	—	—	—	—	—	—	—	—	
Opus Collection	Released: 2013; Label: Rhino Custom Products	—	72	—	—	—	—	—	—	
50 Years – Don't Stop	Released: 16 November 2018; Label: Rhino – No SAI	3	65	7	68	53	—	29	—	BPI: 7× Platinum
Before the Beginning: 1968–1970 Live & Demo Sessions	Released: 15 November 2019; Label: Maxwood Music, Sony	—	—	—	—	—	—	—	—	
Best of Fleetwood Mac 1969-1974	Released: 26 July 2024; Label: Rhino	—	—	—	—	—	—	—	—	
"—" denotes items which were not released in that country or failed to chart.

Notes

- A Albatross was credited to both Fleetwood Mac and Christine Perfect with side A consisting of early tracks by Fleetwood Mac and side B consisting of tracks by Christine Perfect.
- B 25 Years – The Chain was released as both a two-disc and four-disc box set.
- C Four single-disc releases of material from the Madison Blues three-disc box set have been released: Perfect Days (2008) and Perfect in Every Way (2010) are identical compilations of tracks from the original set; while Crazy About the Blues (2010) and Preaching the Blues (2011) are identical to discs one and two of Madison Blues respectively.
- D In 2005, a three-disc set titled Men of the World: The Early Years was released, consisting of material from The Vaudeville Years and Show-Biz Blues.

== Extended plays ==
Extended play, with selected details and chart positions
Title	EP details	Peak chart positions
Title	EP details	US
Extended Play	Released: 30 April 2013; Label: LMJS Productions	48

== Singles ==
List of singles, with selected chart positions and certifications, showing year released and album name
Title	Year	Peak chart positions										Certifications	Album
Title	Year	UK	US	US Rock	US AC	AUS	CAN	GER	IRL	NL	NZ	Certifications	Album
"I Believe My Time Ain't Long"	1967	—			—					—			Non-album singles
"Black Magic Woman"	1968	37	—		—		—		—	—			Non-album singles
"Shake Your Moneymaker"	1968				—			—		—			Peter Green's Fleetwood Mac
"Need Your Love So Bad" (Note: "Need Your Love So Bad" was re-released in the UK in 1969, reaching number 32.)	1968	31	—		—	—	—	—	—	7	—		Non-album singles
"Albatross" (Note: "Albatross" was re-released in 1973, reaching number 2 in the UK and number 8 in Ireland. This re-release was part of a CBS Records series entitled "Hall of Fame Hits". "Albatross" was again given a UK re-release in 1989, reaching number 96.)	1968	1	— (Note: "Albatross" did not enter the Billboard Hot 100, but peaked at number 4 on the Bubbling Under Hot 100 Singles chart.)		—	11	45	19	5	1	—	BPI: Platinum; RMNZ: Platinum	Non-album singles
"Man of the World"	1969	2			—	100	—	23	5	13	—		Non-album singles
"Oh Well"	1969	2	55		—	19	54	5	5	1	—		Non-album singles
"Rattlesnake Shake"	1969		—		—	—	—	—		—	—		Then Play On
"The Green Manalishi (With the Two Prong Crown)"	1970	10	—		—	—	—	16	14	6	—		Non-album single
"Tell Me All the Things You Do"	1970									—			Kiln House
"Jewel Eyed Judy"	1971		—		—		—	—		— (Note: "Jewel Eyed Judy" did not chart on the Dutch Single Top 100, but reached number two on the bubbling under portion of the Dutch Top 40.)	—		Kiln House
"Dragonfly" (Note: "Dragonfly" was first made available in the US in 2014 as part of Record Store Day. It charted at number 9 on the US Hot Singles Sales chart.)	1971	52			—			—	—	—			Non-album single
"Sands of Time"	1971		—		—						—		Future Games
"Sentimental Lady"	1972		—		—		—				—		Bare Trees
"Remember Me"	1973		—		—						—		Penguin
"Did You Ever Love Me"	1973	—	—		—								Penguin
"For Your Love"	1973	—	—		—	—		—			—		Mystery to Me
"Heroes Are Hard to Find"	1974	—	—		—								Heroes Are Hard to Find
"Over My Head"	1975	—	20		32	—	9	—			—		Fleetwood Mac (The White Album)
"Warm Ways"	1975	—			—								Fleetwood Mac (The White Album)
"Rhiannon" (Note: "Rhiannon" was re-released in the United Kingdom in 1978, reaching its peak of 46 after originally not charting.)	1976	46	11		33	13	4	—	—	16	—	BPI: 2× Platinum; RMNZ: 5× Platinum	Fleetwood Mac (The White Album)
"Say You Love Me"	1976	40	11		12	38	29	—			—	BPI: Gold; RMNZ: 2× Platinum	Fleetwood Mac (The White Album)
"Go Your Own Way" (Note: "Go Your Own Way" entered the Irish charts in 2019, but reached its peak position in 2023.)	1976	38	10		45	20	11	11	85	1	23	BPI: 6× Platinum; RMNZ: 9× Platinum	Rumours
"Dreams" (Note: "Dreams" entered the Irish charts in 2019 at number 88; it reached a new peak of 23 in 2020. That same year, "Dreams" peaked at number 6 in New Zealand. Its previous peak was number 16.)	1977	18 (Note: In the UK, "Dreams" originally peaked at No. 24 in 1977. In 2026, it reached a new chart peak of 18.)	1		11	4 (Note: "Dreams" initially peaked at 19 on the Australian charts in 1977, however re-entered the charts in 2020 following a viral TikTok video to peak at No. 4; 43 years after its release.)	1	33	23 (Note: "Dreams" entered the Irish charts in 2019 at number 88; it reached a new peak of No. 23 in 2020.)	8	6 (Note: "Dreams" reached a new peak of No. 6 in 2020 after reaching No. 16 during its 1977 chart run.)	BPI: 7× Platinum; ARIA: 15× Platinum; IFPI NOR: Gold; RIAA: Gold; RMNZ: 20× Platinum	Rumours
"Don't Stop"	1977	32	3		22	30	1	41		4		BPI: 2× Platinum; RMNZ: 3× Platinum	Rumours
"You Make Loving Fun"	1977	45	9		28	65	7	—		22	26	BPI: Platinum; RMNZ: 2× Platinum	Rumours
"Tusk"	1979	6	8		—	3	5	7	15	10	4	ARIA: Gold; BPI: Silver; RMNZ: Platinum	Tusk
"Sara"	1979	37	7		13	11	12	44		14	12	BPI: Gold; RMNZ: Platinum	Tusk
"Not That Funny"	1980	—			—			—	—	—			Tusk
"Think About Me"	1980	—	20		39	—	24				—		Tusk
"Sisters of the Moon"	1980		86		—		—	—			—		Tusk
"Angel"	1980				—					—			Tusk
"Fireflies"	1981		60	59	—	—	—						Live
"The Farmer's Daughter" (Note: "Farmer's Daughter" peaked at number 6 in Austria.)	1981	—	—	—	—	—	—	—	—				Live
"Hold Me" (Note: "Hold Me" failed to chart in the UK upon its 1982 release; it was re-released in 1989 when it reached its peak.)	1982	94	4	3	7	12	9	64	—	25	45	BPI: Silver; RMNZ: Gold	Mirage
"Gypsy"	1982	46	12	4	9	17	16	35	25	42	—	BPI: Platinum; RMNZ: 5× Platinum	Mirage
"Love in Store"	1982		22	—	11	96	—				—		Mirage
"Oh Diane"	1982	9	—	—	35		—	46	8				Mirage
"Can't Go Back"	1983	83		—	—				—				Mirage
"Big Love"	1987	9	5	2	23	16	12	17	8	8	29	BPI: Gold; RMNZ: Platinum	Tango in the Night
"Seven Wonders"	1987	56	19	2	13	23	17	47	28	28	49	BPI: Platinum; RMNZ: 2× Platinum	Tango in the Night
"Little Lies"	1987	5	4	14	1	16	13	3	4	10	9	BPI: 3× Platinum; RMNZ: 5× Platinum	Tango in the Night
"Everywhere"	1987	4 (Note: "Everywhere" re-charted on downloads in 2013 following its feature on an advert for UK mobile phone provider 3, peaking at number 15.)	14	22	1	45	29	—	2	4	43	BPI: 7× Platinum; RMNZ: 9× Platinum	Tango in the Night
"Family Man"	1987	54	90	—	23	83	—	29	—	23			Tango in the Night
"Isn't It Midnight"	1988	60		14	—				23	32			Tango in the Night
"As Long as You Follow"	1988	66	43	15	1	35	12	—	—	15	35	RMNZ: Gold	Greatest Hits
"Save Me"	1990	53	33	3	6	41	7	36		16	27		Behind the Mask
"Love Is Dangerous"	1990		—	7	—		70						Behind the Mask
"Skies the Limit"	1990	—	—	40	10	155	26	—		48			Behind the Mask
"In the Back of My Mind"	1990	58		—	—	—		—					Behind the Mask
"Hard Feelings"	1990		—	—	—								Behind the Mask
"Love Shines"	1992	—			—			51		82			25 Years – The Chain
"Paper Doll"	1992		— (Note: "Paper Doll" did not enter the Billboard Hot 100, but peaked at number 8 on the Bubbling Under Hot 100 Singles chart.)	26	32	183	9						25 Years – The Chain
"I Do"	1995	—	—		—		62	—	—	—	—		Time
"Silver Springs" (live)	1997	—	—	—	5		38	—	—	96			The Dance
"Temporary One" (live)	1997	—				130		99	—	—	—		The Dance
"The Chain" (live)	1997		—	30	—		51						The Dance
"Landslide" (live)	1998		51	—	10								The Dance
"Peacekeeper"	2003	—	80	—	10			—	—	100	31		Say You Will
"Say You Will"	2003	—		—	17			—	—	—	—		Say You Will
"Sad Angel"	2013	—											Extended Play
"—" denotes items which failed to chart. A blank indicates either that the single was not released in that territory, or that there is no information available regarding its chart position.

=== Billboard Year-End performances ===
List of Billboard year-end positions
Year	Song	Year-End position
1976	"Say You Love Me"	53
1976	"Rhiannon"	77
1977	"Dreams"	39
1977	"Don't Stop"	52
1977	"Go Your Own Way"	94
1980	"Sara"	87
1980	"Tusk"	94
1982	"Hold Me"	31
1987	"Little Lies"	51
1987	"Big Love"	81

== Other charted and certified songs ==
List of other charted and certified songs, with selected chart positions and certifications, showing year of first (re-)charting and album name
Title	Year	Peak chart positions								Certifications	Album
Title	Year	UK	US	CAN	IRL	US Main. Rock	US Dance Club	US Rock Digital	WW	Certifications	Album
"Straight Back"	1982	—	—	—	—	36	—	—	—		Mirage
"Tango in the Night"	1987	—	—	—	—	28	—	—	—		Tango in the Night
"Big Love (Remix)"	1987	—	—	—	—	—	7	—	—		Tango in the Night
"No Questions Asked"	1988	—	—	—	—	37	—	—	—		Greatest Hits
"The Chain"	2009	67	—	—	59	—	—	3	102	BPI: 6× Platinum; IFPI: Gold; RMNZ: 9× Platinum	Rumours
"Landslide"	2011	20	41	33	11	—	—	5	123	BPI: 3× Platinum; RIAA: Gold; RMNZ: 7× Platinum	Fleetwood Mac
"Songbird"	2011	115	—	—	—	—	—	9	—	BPI: Platinum; RMNZ: Platinum	Rumours
"Never Going Back Again"	2011	—	—	—	—	—	—	35	—	BPI: Platinum; RMNZ: 2× Platinum	Rumours
"Silver Springs"	2025	—	—	—	52	—	—	4	—	BPI: Platinum; RMNZ: 3× Platinum	Rumours

== Videography ==
=== Home video albums ===
- Documentary and Live Concert (1981)
- Mirage Tour (1983)
- Tango in the Night Tour (1988)
- The Early Years 1967–1970 (1994)
- The Dance (1997)
- Classic Albums: Rumours (1997)
- Live in Boston (2004)
- Destiny Rules (2004)
- Don't Stop (2009)
- Rumours: 35th Anniversary Edition Disc 3: The Rosebud Film (2013)
- Tango in the Night: Deluxe Edition Disc 4: Promotional Videos (2017)

=== Music videos ===
- 1976 – "Rhiannon" (performance clip)
- 1977 – "Go Your Own Way" (performance clip)
- 1977 – "Dreams" (performance clip)
- 1977 – "Don't Stop" (performance clip)
- 1977 – "You Make Loving Fun" (performance clip)
- 1979 – "Tusk"
- 1979 – "Sara" (performance clip)
- 1979 – "Not That Funny" (performance clip)
- 1982 – "Hold Me"
- 1982 – "Gypsy"
- 1982 – "Oh Diane" (performance clip)
- 1987 – "Big Love"
- 1987 – "Seven Wonders"
- 1987 – "Little Lies"
- 1987 – "Family Man"
- 1987 – "Everywhere" (Version 1)
- 1987 – "Everywhere" (Version 2 with Band)
- 1988 – "Isn't It Midnight" (performance clip)
- 1988 – "As Long as You Follow"
- 1990 – "Save Me"
- 1990 – "In the Back of My Mind"
- 1990 – "Skies the Limit"
- 1992 – "Love Shines"
- 1992 – "Paper Doll"
- 1997 – "Silver Springs" (performance clip)
- 1997 – "The Chain" (performance clip)
- 1997 – "Temporary One" (performance clip)
- 1997 – "Landslide" (performance clip)
- 2003 – "Peacekeeper" (performance clip)
- 2003 – "Say You Will" (performance clip)
