= The Very Best of Fleetwood Mac =

Greatest hits album by Fleetwood Mac
- Released: 12 October 2002
- Recorded: 1968–1997
- Genre: Rock
- Length: 76:59 (UK); 140:52 (US)
- Label: Reprise/Warner Strategic Marketing
- Producer: Fleetwood Mac, Lindsey Buckingham, Keith Olsen, Richard Dashut, Ken Caillat, Greg Ladanyi, Elliot Scheiner

Fleetwood Mac chronology
The Dance (1997)	The Very Best of Fleetwood Mac (2002)	Say You Will (2003)

Professional ratings
Review scores
Source	Rating
AllMusic	4.5/5 stars

The Very Best of Fleetwood Mac is an enhanced compilation album released by British-American rock band Fleetwood Mac in 2002 to promote their then-upcoming album Say You Will (2003). It was released as a double album in the US on 12 October 2002 and as a single disc in the UK. It debuted on the Billboard 200 album chart at number 12 on 2 November 2002 and spent 42 weeks on the chart. It was certified gold on 12 November 2002, platinum on 10 January 2003, and later 4× Platinum on 11 September 2018, by the RIAA.

The US version contained the highly successful Californian era of Fleetwood Mac's work (1975 onwards). It also featured the B-side "Silver Springs", the previously unreleased The Dance performance of "Go Insane", and several rare single remixes of key tracks, such as "Rhiannon" and "Sisters of the Moon". The enhanced section contained rare live performances, interviews, music videos and footage of the band making their next album.

The UK version of 2002 was not enhanced, and contained three songs from the Peter Green-led blues era of Fleetwood Mac.

== 2009 re-release ==
In October 2009, the two-disc US version was released in the UK and many other territories in Europe, Australia and New Zealand, to coincide with the European and Australasian legs of the group's 'Unleashed' world tour. The re-released version features a different picture on the outer slipcase to previous releases, but does not contain the enhanced material of the 2002 US release.

The re-release proved to be as successful in the UK as the previous 2002 release, and it re-entered the UK album chart at No. 6 (the 2002 edition had peaked at No. 7). Sales of both the 2002 edition and the 2009 edition combined have achieved 7× Platinum status (2,100,000 equivalent units) by January 2023. The album has spent more than two years within the top 40, and 360 weeks in the UK Top 100 by December 2018. The album sold over 89,000 copies in the UK in 2013 having reached as high as #34 on the album chart earlier in the year.

The Very Best reached No. 1 on the Australian ARIA Catalogue Chart in December 2009, and achieved platinum status in New Zealand within only five weeks of release.

== Track listing ==
=== UK 2002 release ===
No.	Title	Writer(s)	Place of origin	Length
1.	"Go Your Own Way"	Lindsey Buckingham	Rumours, 1977	3:39
2.	"Don't Stop"	Christine McVie	Rumours	3:11
3.	"Dreams"	Stevie Nicks	Rumours	4:16
4.	"Little Lies"	C. McVie, Eddy Quintela	Tango in the Night, 1987	3:38
5.	"Everywhere"	C. McVie	Tango in the Night	3:42
6.	"Albatross"	Peter Green	Non-album single, 1968; later appeared on The Pious Bird of Good Omen (UK) and English Rose (US), 1969	3:08
7.	"You Make Loving Fun"	C. McVie	Rumours	3:33
8.	"Rhiannon" (single mix, 1976)	Nicks	Fleetwood Mac, 1975	3:47
9.	"Black Magic Woman"	Green	Non-album single; later appeared on The Pious Bird of Good Omen and English Rose	2:51
10.	"Tusk"	Buckingham	Tusk, 1979	3:34
11.	"Say You Love Me" (single mix, 1976)	C. McVie	Fleetwood Mac	4:01
12.	"Man of the World"	Green	Non-album single, 1969; later appeared on Greatest Hits, 1971	2:50
13.	"Seven Wonders"	Sandy Stewart, Nicks	Tango in the Night	3:36
14.	"Family Man"	Buckingham, Richard Dashut	Tango in the Night	4:02
15.	"Sara"	Nicks	Tusk	6:27
16.	"Monday Morning"	Buckingham	Fleetwood Mac	2:45
17.	"Gypsy"	Nicks	Mirage, 1982	4:22
18.	"Over My Head" (single mix, 1975)	C. McVie	Fleetwood Mac	3:07
19.	"Landslide"	Nicks	Fleetwood Mac	3:15
20.	"The Chain"	Buckingham, Mick Fleetwood, C. McVie, John McVie, Nicks	Rumours	4:29
21.	"Big Love" (live, 1997)	Buckingham	The Dance, 1997; originally from Tango in the Night	2:47

=== US 2002 release and UK 2009 re-release ===
Disc 1
No.	Title	Writer(s)	Place of origin	Length
1.	"Monday Morning"	Buckingham	Fleetwood Mac	2:45
2.	"Dreams"	Nicks	Rumours	4:15
3.	"You Make Loving Fun"	C. McVie	Rumours	3:33
4.	"Go Your Own Way"	Buckingham	Rumours	3:40
5.	"Rhiannon (Will You Ever Win)" (single mix, 1976)	Nicks	"Rhiannon" single; original version found on Fleetwood Mac	3:46
6.	"Say You Love Me"	C. McVie	Fleetwood Mac	4:03
7.	"I'm So Afraid" (live, 1997; edited version)	Buckingham	unreleased in this edit; full version found on The Dance	6:01
8.	"Silver Springs" (remix, 1976)	Nicks	previously unreleased; original mix found on the "Go Your Own Way" single	4:30
9.	"Over My Head" (single mix)	C. McVie	"Over My Head" single; original version found on Fleetwood Mac	3:08
10.	"Never Going Back Again"	Buckingham	Rumours	2:14
11.	"Sara"	Nicks	Tusk	6:26
12.	"Love in Store"	C. McVie, Jim Recor	Mirage	3:10
13.	"Tusk"	Buckingham	Tusk	3:34
14.	"Landslide"	Nicks	Fleetwood Mac	3:17
15.	"Songbird"	C. McVie	Rumours	3:20
16.	"Big Love" (live, 1997)	Buckingham	The Dance	2:48
17.	"Storms"	Nicks	Tusk	5:30
Total length:				66:00

Disc 2
No.	Title	Writer(s)	Place of origin	Length
1.	"The Chain"	Buckingham, Fleetwood, C. McVie, J. McVie, Nicks	Rumours	4:29
2.	"Don't Stop"	C. McVie	Rumours	3:12
3.	"What Makes You Think You're the One"	Buckingham	Tusk	3:30
4.	"Gypsy"	Nicks	Mirage	4:22
5.	"Second Hand News"	Buckingham	Rumours	2:52
6.	"Little Lies"	C. McVie, Quintela	Tango in the Night	3:39
7.	"Think About Me" (single mix, 1980)	C. McVie	"Think About Me" single; original version found on Tusk	2:42
8.	"Go Insane" (live, 1997)	Buckingham	"Silver Springs" single	4:20
9.	"Gold Dust Woman" (fade-in version)	Nicks	Rumours	4:59
10.	"Hold Me"	C. McVie, Robbie Patton	Mirage	3:44
11.	"Seven Wonders"	Stewart, Nicks	Tango in the Night	3:38
12.	"World Turning"	Buckingham, C. McVie	Fleetwood Mac	4:24
13.	"Everywhere"	C. McVie	Tango in the Night	3:41
14.	"Sisters of the Moon" (single mix, 1980)	Nicks	Tusk	4:41
15.	"Family Man"	Buckingham, Dashut	Tango in the Night	4:01
16.	"As Long as You Follow"	C. McVie, Quintela	Greatest Hits	4:18
17.	"No Questions Asked"	Nicks	Greatest Hits	4:42
18.	"Skies the Limit"	C. McVie, Quintela	Behind the Mask	3:46
19.	"Paper Doll"	Nicks, Rick Vito, John Heron	25 Years – The Chain	3:58
Total length:				74:58

== Charts ==
=== Weekly charts ===
2002–2003 weekly chart performance for The Very Best of Fleetwood Mac
Chart (2002–2003)	Peak position
Belgian Albums (Ultratop Flanders)	39
Canadian Albums (Nielsen SoundScan)	21
Danish Albums (Hitlisten)	11
Dutch Albums (Album Top 100)	75
European Albums (Music & Media)	29
German Albums (Offizielle Top 100)	31
Irish Albums (IRMA)	7
New Zealand Albums (RMNZ)	5
Scottish Albums (OCC)	3
Swedish Albums (Sverigetopplistan)	18
UK Albums (OCC)	7
US Billboard 200	12

2005 weekly chart performance for The Very Best of Fleetwood Mac
Chart (2005)	Peak position
Norwegian Albums (VG-lista)	27

2006 weekly chart performance for The Very Best of Fleetwood Mac
Chart (2005)	Peak position
Spanish Albums (Promusicae)	61

2009 weekly chart performance for The Very Best of Fleetwood Mac (reissue)
Chart (2009)	Peak position
Australian Albums (ARIA)	16
Irish Albums (IRMA)	14
UK Albums (OCC)	6

2015 weekly chart performance for The Very Best of Fleetwood Mac
Chart (2015)	Peak position
Australian Albums (ARIA)	11

2019 weekly chart performance for The Very Best of Fleetwood Mac
Chart (2019)	Peak position
Canadian Albums (Billboard)	21
Portuguese Albums (AFP)	44
US Top Catalog Albums (Billboard)	2
US Top Rock Albums (Billboard)	5

=== Year-end charts ===
2002 year-end chart performance for The Very Best of Fleetwood Mac
Chart (2002)	Position
Canadian Albums (Nielsen SoundScan)	162
UK Albums (OCC)	61

2003 year-end chart performance for The Very Best of Fleetwood Mac
Chart (2003)	Position
UK Albums (OCC)	117
US Billboard 200	135

2004 year-end chart performance for The Very Best of Fleetwood Mac
Chart (2004)	Position
Australian Albums (ARIA)	96
UK Albums (OCC)	188

2009 year-end chart performance for The Very Best of Fleetwood Mac
Chart (2009)	Position
Australian Albums (ARIA)	54
UK Albums (OCC)	45

2015 year-end chart performance for The Very Best of Fleetwood Mac
Chart (2015)	Position
Australian Albums (ARIA)	56

2016 year-end chart performance for The Very Best of Fleetwood Mac
Chart (2016)	Position
Australian Albums (ARIA)	92

2017 year-end chart performance for The Very Best of Fleetwood Mac
Chart (2017)	Position
Australian Albums (ARIA)	56
US Top Rock Albums (Billboard)	99

2018 year-end chart performance for The Very Best of Fleetwood Mac
Chart (2018)	Position
Australian Albums (ARIA)	75
Irish Albums (IRMA)	17
UK Albums (OCC)	39
US Top Rock Albums (Billboard)	85

2019 year-end chart performance for The Very Best of Fleetwood Mac
Chart (2019)	Position
Australian Albums (ARIA)	87

=== Decade-end charts ===
2000–2009 decade-end chart performance for The Very Best of Fleetwood Mac
Chart (2000–2009)	Position
Australian Albums (ARIA)	35

2010–2019 decade-end chart performance for The Very Best of Fleetwood Mac
Chart (2010–2019)	Position
Australian Albums (ARIA)	42
UK Albums (OCC)	61

== Certifications ==
Certifications and sales for The Very Best of Fleetwood Mac
Region	Certification	Certified units/sales
Argentina (CAPIF)	Gold	20,000^{^}
Australia (ARIA)	8× Platinum	560,000^{^}
Belgium (BRMA)	Platinum	50,000^{*}
Canada (Music Canada)	Platinum	100,000^{^}
Ireland (IRMA)	3× Platinum	45,000^{^}
Netherlands (NVPI)	Gold	40,000^{^}
New Zealand (RMNZ)	Platinum	15,000^{^}
United Kingdom (BPI)	7× Platinum	2,100,000^{‡}
United States (RIAA)	4× Platinum	2,000,000^{‡}
Summaries
Europe (IFPI)	2× Platinum	2,000,000^{*}
^{*} Sales figures based on certification alone.^{^} Shipments figures based on certification alone.^{‡} Sales+streaming figures based on certification alone.
