= Family Man (Fleetwood Mac song) =

Single by Fleetwood Mac

from the album Tango in the Night
- B-side: "Down Endless Street"
- Released: 30 November 1987
- Recorded: 1985–1986
- Genre: Synth-pop; flamenco; soft rock
- Length: 4:01
- Label: Warner Bros.
- Songwriters: Lindsey Buckingham; Richard Dashut
- Producers: Lindsey Buckingham; Richard Dashut

Fleetwood Mac UK singles chronology
"Little Lies" (1987)	"Family Man" (1987)	"Everywhere" (1988)

Fleetwood Mac US singles chronology
"Everywhere" (1987)	"Family Man" (1987)	"As Long as You Follow" (1988)

"Family Man" is a song by the British-American rock band Fleetwood Mac from their 1987 studio album Tango in the Night. The song was written by Lindsey Buckingham and producer Richard Dashut.

In the UK, "Family Man" was released as the fourth single following "Little Lies", where it debuted at No. 91 on 19 December 1987. It later went on to peak at No. 54 on 19 January 1988. In the US, the song was released as the fifth single from the album as the follow-up to "Everywhere" in March 1988, and reached No. 90 on the Billboard Hot 100 singles chart.

== Background ==
Similar to "Big Love", "Family Man" was originally slated to appear on Buckingham's third solo album, although the project later morphed into Fleetwood Mac's Tango in the Night. "Family Man" was nearly complete when Buckingham first presented the song to Fleetwood Mac, although the band "sweetened up" the mix and interspersed some vocal fragments from Stevie Nicks throughout the song's bridge. The low voice on "Family Man" was sung by Buckingham, who achieved the effect by slowing down the tape speed. The song possesses a stepwise ascending harmony and follows a VII-I chord progression.

When asked about the song's subject matter, Buckingham said that song did not relate to domestic life and was instead about a willingness to contribute within a group context. He discussed how the lyrics related to his attempts at fostering a productive working environment in Fleetwood Mac where he could provide assistance to the rest of the group and enable them to participate in the creative process.

== Release ==
"Family Man" was released as a special limited-edition box set comprising the 7-inch single, plus two prints by the artist Susan Young and Christine Tongue. The 12-inch single included several mixes of "Family Man", which were developed by Arthur Baker. One of those mixes, titled the "House Mix", reached number 29 on the Music Week Dance Singles Chart. In the United Kingdom, the 12-inch single was appended with "You and I, Part II", whereas the 12" inch single issued in the United States included a non-album song written by Buckingham titled "Down Endless Street", which also appeared as the B-side of the 7-inch single.

"Family Man" entered the UK singles chart at number 91, which Music & Media labelled as a "rather disappointing" debut. During the song's fourth week on the UK singles chart, "Family Man" reached its peak position of No. 54. "Family Man" also received airplay in other European countries, including Germany, where it peaked at No. 29 in January 1988. That same month "Family Man" reached No. 19 on the European Airplay Top 50 chart published by Music & Media.

In March 1988, "Family Man" was released as a single in non-European countries, including the United States. Radio & Records mentioned in its 8 April 1988 publication that 57 percent of reporting United States adult contemporary radio stations included "Family Man" in their rotation. The following month, "Family Man" peaked at No. 23 on the Billboard Adult Contemporary chart.

"Family Man" is also included on the 2002 release The Very Best of Fleetwood Mac. While "Family Man" was not included on the physical release of 50 Years - Don't Stop, it does appear on the streaming service edition of the album, which substituted several songs from the Peter Green era for songs from Kiln House onwards.

== Critical reception ==
In his "Rock Over London" column, Graham Dene was critical of the decision to release "Family Man" as a single in Europe, saying that "Warner Brothers have skillfully avoided the extremely catchy 'You And I' and the new US single 'Everywhere'; they have not even gone for 'Isn't It Midnight'. Instead, we get the considerably less memorable 'Family Man'". Music & Media wrote that the song's "very keen production and a crystal clear acoustic guitar contribute to the song's addictive and slowly pushing drive." Cashbox called it "an engaging dance tune" with "an ethereal vocal and throbbing groove."

Writing for The Guardian, Alexis Petridis thought that Buckingham's "unsettled twitchiness" was evident in the "staccato vocals of 'Family Man.'" Alex Henderson of AllMusic labeled "Family Man" as one of the best songs ever written by Buckingham. Mike Mettler of Sound & Vision called the song a "deep cut reflecting [Buckingham's] inherent quirkiness" and highlighted the song's "Spanish guitar lines punctuated by rolling castanets".

== Music video ==
Promotion for the single was limited, as Lindsey Buckingham, the song's composer, had left the group after the album's release. A video was created mixing previous footage of the band from the "Seven Wonders" video alongside archive footage of American families from the Great-Depression era. The video uses a shorter edit of the album version.

== Track listing ==
UK 7-inch vinyl single (Warner Bros. Records W 8114)

1. "Family Man" – 4:01
2. "Down Endless Street" – 4:24

UK 12-inch vinyl single (Warner Bros. Records W 8114 T)

1. "Family Man" (Extended Vocal Remix) – 8:30
2. "Family Party" (Bonus Beats) – 4:56
3. "You and I, Part II" – 2:56

12" US single (Warner Brothers Records 0–20842)

1. "Family Man" (Extended vocal remix) – 8:30
2. "Family Man" (I'm a Jazz Man dub) – 8:52
3. "Family Man" (Extended guitar remix) – 6:26
4. "Family Party" (bonus beats) – 4:36
5. "Down Endless Street" – 4:24

== Personnel ==
- Lindsey Buckingham – lead and backing vocals, guitars, bass, keyboards, Fairlight CMI, drum and percussion programming
- Stevie Nicks – backing vocals
- Mick Fleetwood – percussion

== Charts ==
Chart (1987–1988)	Peak position
Australia (Kent Music Report)	83
European Hot 100 Singles (Music & Media)	64
European Airplay (Music & Media)	19
Netherlands (Single Top 100)	23
UK Singles (OCC)	54
US Billboard Hot 100	90
US Adult Contemporary (Billboard)	23
US Adult Contemporary (Radio & Records)	22
West Germany (GfK)	29
