= Tango in the Night (song) =

Promotional single by Fleetwood Mac

from the album Tango in the Night
- Released: 1987
- Recorded: 1986–1987
- Genre: Pop rock; soft rock; hard rock; art rock; progressive rock
- Length: 3:56
- Label: Warner Bros.
- Songwriter: Lindsey Buckingham
- Producers: Lindsey Buckingham & Richard Dashut

"Tango in the Night" is a song by British–American rock band Fleetwood Mac from their album of the same name. It was one of the four songs on Tango in the Night solely composed and sung by Lindsey Buckingham, who also co-wrote three additional songs on the album. The song received airplay on album-oriented rock stations and reached No. 28 on the Billboard Album Rock Tracks chart.

== Background ==
Following the release Lindsey Buckingham's second album, Go Insane, the guitarist began crafting songs for what he intended to be his third solo album. Among the songs recorded for the album was "Tango in the Night". By late 1985, Fleetwood Mac reconvened to record a new studio album, so Buckingham allowed the band to include the song as the title track.

"Tango in the Night" was recorded at Buckingham's home studio in Bel Air called The Slope. Some of the drums on "Tango in the Night" originated from a jam session between Mick Fleetwood and Buckingham. During the development of the title track, Buckingham took further inspiration from live versions of "I'm So Afraid". An early demo of the song, included on the 2017 deluxe edition of Tango in the Night, featured a trembling vocal line at the end of every chorus, which was eventually incorporated into another Buckingham-penned track, "Caroline". The title track possesses a stepwise descending harmony and a I-VII-VI chord progression.

Radio and Records listed the title track as the second most added song to playlists from reporting US AOR stations in its 17 April 1987 publication, placing it above "Isn't It Midnight" and "Little Lies" from the same album. For the 22 May 1987 edition of the publication, the song reached number 22 on the R&R National Airplay charts of AOR tracks, with 62 percent of reporting AOR stations including the song in their playlists. It later peaked at number 21 on the same chart the following week with a total of 104 reporting stations playing the song. That same month, the song reached its peak of number 28 on the Billboard Album Rock Tracks chart.

== Critical reception ==
The Miami Herald praised the rhythm section of Fleetwood and John McVie on "Tango in the Night", saying that there was "a new sense of muscle" to their contributions on the deluxe edition of Tango in the Night. Writing for the Ottawa Citizen, Evelyn Erskine thought that the song provided the album with "an intriguing moment, but also one that would wear thin had the entire album continued in that vein". Guitar One magazine said that the song was "filled with '80s-style power chording, epic shred, and a vibe in the verses reminiscent of "Play in the Rain'" from Buckingham's 1984 album, Go Insane. Writing for Rolling Stone, Jon Pareles highlighted the song's "rippling zither and quietly ticking drums". Peter Kane of Sounds was more critical of the song, saying that it possessed a "risible" guitar solo.

Dave Fawbert of ShortList praised the song's instrumentation, mentioning that the "synth-harps and soft percussion [give] way to a big, angry chorus where Mick and John lay down the groove". Alexis Petridis of The Guardian wrote that "the title track surges from quiet tension to florid solos". Ultimate Classic Rock stated that the title track "is just as dysfunctional as the album’s recording process — and that’s what makes it work. Jumping between whispered tones and explosive guitar solos, past and present tenses, loneliness and the sudden lack of, the song is a masterpiece of bewilderment, lyrically and sonically."

Pitchfork commented that the song's "sense of space imparts the feeling of rowing through fog and mystery" and further added that its "coordinated staccato harmonies" are warmer and brighter on the deluxe edition. Nick Deriso of Something Else! said that the song "bears the most striking resemblance to his quirky individual efforts". Discussing the Mobile Fidelity mix of "Tango in the Night" in 2025, Mike Mettler of Sound & Vision said that the song's "pensive tap-tap-tap percussion and dreamy, sensual lyrical presentation" made it a "direct sequel" to "Play in the Rain", a song from Buckingham's 1984 album, Go Insane. Mettler also highlighted Buckingham's guitar work and vocals on the song, saying that "each time he holds the 'o' at the end of 'tango' through slabs of enormous, layered guitar riffery for what seems like an endless number of bars never fails to excite."

== Personnel ==
Fleetwood Mac

- Christine McVie – keyboards, synthesizer
- Lindsey Buckingham – lead vocals, guitars, Fairlight CMI
- John McVie – bass guitar
- Mick Fleetwood – drums, percussion

== Charts ==
Chart (1987)	Peak position
US Album Rock Tracks (Billboard)	28
US AOR Tracks (Radio & Records)	21

Chart (2021)	Peak position
UK Singles Downloads (OCC)	26
