= Paper Doll (Fleetwood Mac song) =

Single by Fleetwood Mac

from the album 25 Years: The Chain
- B-side: "The Chain"
- Released: 24 November 1992
- Recorded: 1988–1992
- Genre: Soft rock
- Length: 3:56
- Label: Warner Brothers
- Songwriters: Stevie Nicks; Rick Vito; John Heron
- Producer: Richard Dashut

Fleetwood Mac singles chronology
"Love Shines" (1992)	"Paper Doll" (1992)	"I Do" (1995)

"Paper Doll" is a song by the British-American band Fleetwood Mac. It was one of the four new compositions included on the band's 1992 box set, 25 Years: The Chain. That same year, the song was also released as a single exclusively in North America and Australia with "The Chain" as its B-side. The song's chord progression was written by Rick Vito and John Heron and the melody and lyrics were composed by Stevie Nicks.

While "Paper Doll" missed the US Billboard Hot 100, it appeared on some of the publication's component charts and also reached the top ten in Canada, peaking at number nine in February 1993.

== Background ==
"Paper Doll" was originally slated to appear on their 1988 Greatest Hits album, but Mick Fleetwood was dissatisfied with the song, so the band replaced it with "No Questions Asked", another Nicks composition. By the time the band was assembling their 1992 box set 25 Years – The Chain, Fleetwood had warmed up to "Paper Doll" and agreed to add the song to the collection's track list. "Paper Doll" also appeared on the US 2002/UK 2009 editions of The Very Best of Fleetwood Mac and all editions of 50 Years - Don't Stop.

Lindsey Buckingham was no longer a member of Fleetwood Mac during the recording of "Paper Doll", although he did overdub some guitar and assisted Richard Dashut with the production in an uncredited capacity. Warner Bros. Records included an advertisement in Radio & Records that highlighted the contributions of seven Fleetwood Mac members on "the premiere single from 25 Years – The Chain." Cashbox noted that at the time of the single's release, "Paper Doll" was the first Fleetwood Mac song to feature every member from the band dating back to 1975.

== Release ==
"Paper Doll" was released by Warner Records with "The Chain" as its B-side. During the week of 27 November 1992, "Paper Doll" was among the most added songs on adult contemporary, album oriented rock, and contemporary hit radio stations, with 50 stations in the latter category adding the song to their playlists, representing 22 percent of all reporting radio stations in that format. Billboard reviewed the single the following week, saying that its "semi-autobiographical lyrics are typically cryptic, and fun for diehard fans to decipher". They concluded their review by calling it an "instant album-rock add". The following week, the song debuted at number 29 on the Billboard Album Rock Tracks; it also received a music video that was launched on VH1. The song later peaked at No. 26 on the Album Rock Tracks Chart.

For the week dated 26 December 1992, the song ascended to its peak position of number eight on the Bubbling Under Hot 100, an extension to the Billboard Hot 100. The song spent a total of nine weeks on this listing.

== Personnel ==
- Stevie Nicks – lead vocals
- Billy Burnette – guitars, backing vocals
- Rick Vito – guitars, backing vocals
- Christine McVie – keyboards
- John McVie – bass guitar
- Mick Fleetwood – drums, timbales, güira, congas, tambourine
- Lindsey Buckingham – backing vocals, additional guitar

== Charts ==
=== Weekly charts ===
Chart (1992–1993)	Peak position
Australia (ARIA)	183
Canada Top Singles (RPM)	9
Canada Adult Contemporary (RPM)	22
US Bubbling Under Hot 100 (Billboard)	8
US Adult Contemporary (Billboard)	32
US Mainstream Rock (Billboard)	26

=== Year-end charts ===
Chart (1993)	Position
Canada Top Singles (RPM)	82
