= The Snake Charmer (Rousseau) =

1907 painting by Henri Rousseau

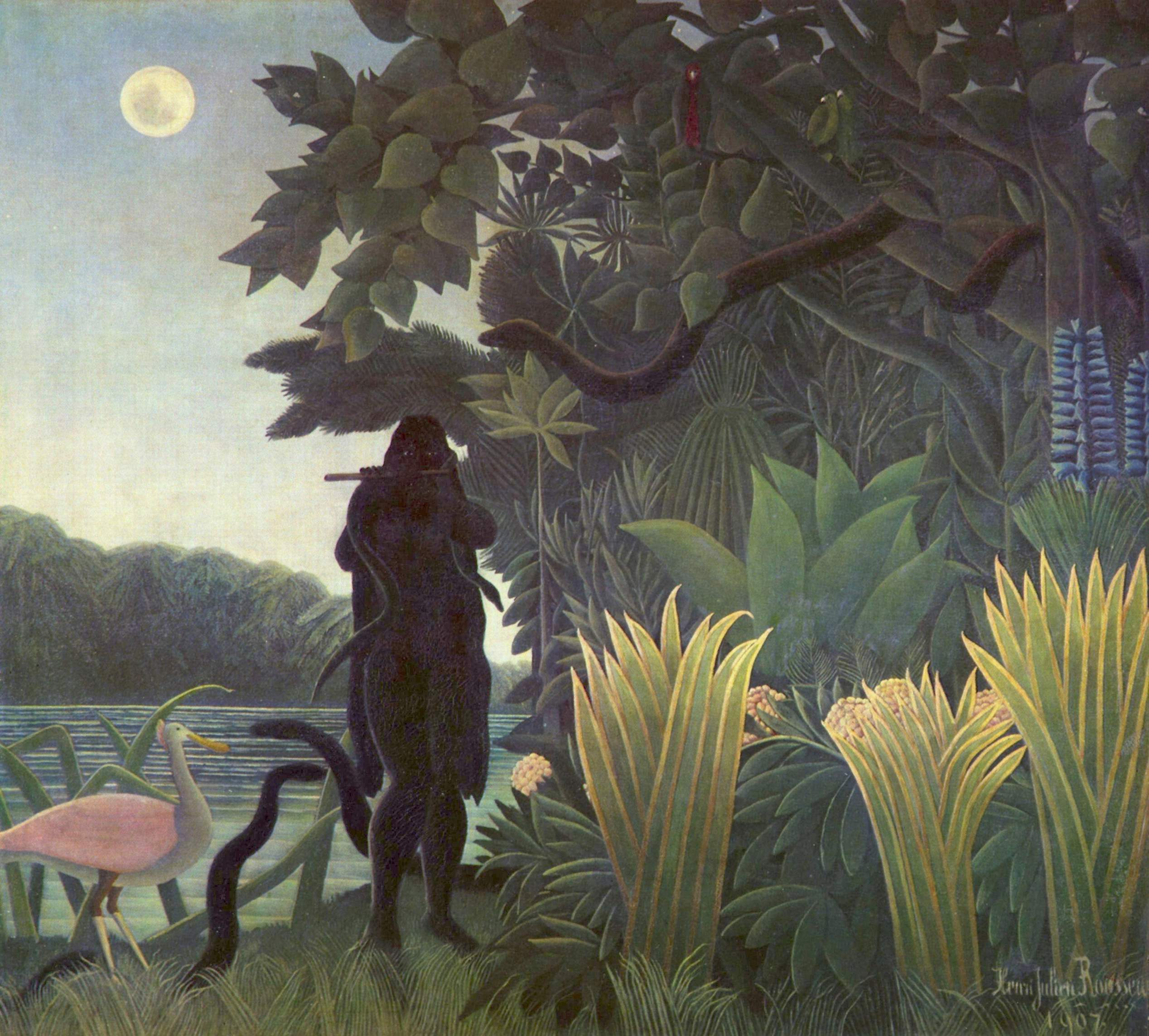
- Artist: Henri Rousseau
- Year: 1907
- Medium: oil on canvas
- Dimensions: 169 cm × 189.5 cm (67 in × 74.6 in)
- Location: Musée d'Orsay; Paris

The Snake Charmer (French: La Charmeuse de Serpents) is a 1907 oil-on-canvas painting by French Naïve artist Henri Rousseau (1844–1910). It is a depiction of a woman with glowing eyes playing a flute in the moonlight by the edge of a dark jungle with a snake extending toward her from a nearby tree, two near her legs, and one wrapped around her shoulders.

== History ==
The Snake Charmer was commissioned by Berthe, Comtesse de Delaunay, the mother of artist Robert Delaunay. It was Rousseau's first large commission and was exhibited in the 1907 Autumn Salon. Because Rousseau never traveled outside of France, the exotic plants in the painting resulted from Rousseau's visits to the Jardin des plantes and from magazines. From 1922 to 1936, The Snake Charmer was in the collection of Jacques Doucet. It was promised to the Louvre in 1925 and became part of its collection in 1937.

== Description ==
The painting has an asymmetric vertical composition with a detailed depiction of the jungle on the right and a woman playing the flute on the left, back-lit by moonlight from a full moon. A snake, charmed by the music, stretches horizontally across the painting. The Musée d'Orsay described the painting as "a black Eve in a disquieting Garden of Eden".

== Popular culture references ==
Sylvia Plath's 1957 poem "Snakecharmer" and Willard Elliot's 1975 composition The Snake Charmer for Alto Flute and Orchestra were inspired by Rousseau's painting.

The painting was used as cover art for the 2000 novel Merrick by Anne Rice, Darwin's Dangerous Idea by Daniel Dennett, Origins of the Modern Mind by Merlin Donald, and Gaia by James E. Lovelock. A painting inspired by this one, Homage to Henri Rousseau by Australian artist Brett-Livingstone Strong, was used as the album cover of the 1987 Fleetwood Mac album Tango in the Night.
