= What Makes You Think You're the One =

Song by British-American rock band Fleetwood Mac, released in 1979

Song by Fleetwood Mac

from the album Tusk
- Released: 1979
- Recorded: 1979
- Genre: Rock; new wave
- Length: 3:32
- Label: Warner Bros.
- Songwriter: Lindsey Buckingham
- Producers: Fleetwood Mac, Richard Dashut, Ken Caillat

"What Makes You Think You're the One" is a song by British-American rock band Fleetwood Mac, released in 1979. Composed and sung by guitarist Lindsey Buckingham, it was one of his nine songs that appeared on the Tusk album. The song was also included on the US 2002 and UK 2009 editions of The Very Best of Fleetwood Mac.

== Background ==
In February 1979, Buckingham entered Studio D of The Village Recorder with a JVC ghetto blaster. After playing producers Ken Caillat and Richard Dashut a demo of "What Makes You Think You're the One" through some JBL speakers in the control room, Buckingham suggested that they create a new version using the JVC deck's input as the recording device. Caillat pushed back against this, contending that the boombox would make the song excessively compressed, but Buckingham insisted that they use the device to emulate the distorted sounds of old rock and roll recordings.

Fleetwood set up his drums in the corner of Studio D and recorded the song with Buckingham using the boombox as the recording device for the drums. Fleetwood said that they "opened the mics up so that it was recording straight onto tape, and that overload and compression is straight off the ghetto blaster. It gave it that "suck and push" sound". More conventional studio microphones were also placed throughout the studio to give Caillat and Dashut further options during the mixing process.

Buckingham and Fleetwood stated that they created "What Makes You Think You're the One" as a two-piece without any other band members, although Caillat recalled that John McVie was also present in the studio during the song's recording sessions. For the song's original tracking, Buckingham was on piano and Fleetwood used an 18-inch Paiste China cymbal in his drum set. Caillat posited that the song was directed at Stevie Nicks and that Buckingham "imitate[d] Stevie's distinctive vibrato, giving it a bleating, goat like quality, and her rudimentary piano quality, which he knew made her self conscious".

== Critical reception ==
Ed Harrison of Billboard identified "What Makes You Think You're the One" as a "sarcastic and light-hearted" song with "steady" instrumentation. Nick Kent of New Musical Express called the song "an effective, lightweight and jokey slice of raucousness, not unlike some of The Beatles White Album frivolities." Paste ranked the song number 26 on its list of the 30 greatest Fleetwood Mac songs, commenting that it sounds "like a demo, [which] is perfect for Buckingham’s ragged, drug-addled vocals". Rolling Stone said that "Buckingham rocks out with the raw spirit of a freewheeling garage band" on "What Makes You Think You're the One" and also placed the song at number 36 on its list of the 50 greatest Fleetwood Mac songs.

== Live performances ==
"What Makes You Think You're the One" was played on the Tusk Tour. A November 1979 live recording from St. Louis was included on the 5-disc deluxe edition of Tusk. Christine McVie played piano for live performances of "What Make Makes You Think You're the One" despite not appearing in any capacity on the song's studio version. She remarked that "'What Makes You Think You're The One' from Tusk is especially tough to play. You have to keep crashing away at chords through the whole thing. By the time it's finished my wrists are like spaghetti." These renditions began with a series of rimshots played by Fleetwood on a snare drum a piano glissando from Christine McVie. In a review of Fleetwood Mac's performance on 25 September 1979 at the Capital Centre, Richard Harrington of The Washington Post said that the song demonstrated Buckingham's "vibrantly inventive guitar leads and exhausting vocal extremes."

== Personnel ==
- Lindsey Buckingham – electric guitars, piano, vocals, possible bass guitar
- Mick Fleetwood – drums
- John McVie – possible bass guitar
