= Greatest Hits (1988 Fleetwood Mac album) =

1988 greatest hits album by Fleetwood Mac

Greatest hits album by Fleetwood Mac
- Released: 21 November 1988
- Recorded: 1975–1988
- Genres: Rock; folk; pop
- Length: 64:19 (US); 66:45 (Europe, Australia)
- Label: Warner Bros.
- Producers: Grag Ladanyi and Fleetwood Mac (original versions produced by Fleetwood Mac, Keith Olsen, Richard Dashut, Ken Calliat and Lindsey Buckingham)

Fleetwood Mac chronology
Tango in the Night (1987)	Greatest Hits (1988)	Behind the Mask (1990)

Singles from Greatest Hits
- 1. "As Long as You Follow" Released: 28 November 1988; 2. "Hold Me" Released: 13 February 1989

Professional ratings
Review scores
Source	Rating
AllMusic	4.5/5 stars

Greatest Hits is a greatest hits album by the British and American rock band Fleetwood Mac, released on 21 November 1988 by Warner Bros. Records. Along with two songs recorded for the album, Greatest Hits covers the period of the band's material from their 1975 Fleetwood Mac album through their 1987 Tango in the Night album.

Other than the identical title, it is completely different from the 1971 Greatest Hits album (which covers the early Peter Green incarnation of the band) and the two releases have no tracks in common. The 1988 album draws only on recordings from after Stevie Nicks and Lindsey Buckingham joined the group in 1975, omitting earlier hits such as "Albatross" and "Oh Well".

The album has proven to be a major success since the time of its release. It peaked at number 13 on the US Billboard 200 and sold steadily over the years since its release, and has to date been certified 8× platinum for shipping eight million copies there. In the United Kingdom, it reached number three upon release and has returned several times to the UK album chart and has been certified triple platinum for shipping 900,000 copies there.

== Background ==
This was the first Fleetwood Mac album to feature contributions from Rick Vito and Billy Burnette, who joined the band in 1987. Speaking about the album, Christine McVie expressed her belief that Greatest Hits had "no padding" and also allowed Fleetwood Mac to "clean the slate and start the next chapter with these two guys". Vito described the compilation album as "a presentation of the new band" and "the ushering in of a new era".

The album contains two new tracks, "As Long as You Follow" (which was released as a single to promote the album), and "No Questions Asked".

The track listing for Greatest Hits varied between regions, with additional differences between the LP format and CD/cassette editions. In the United States, "Big Love", "Over My Head", and "You Make Loving Fun" were exclusive to cassette and CD versions of the album. The track listing on the European LP contained 13 songs, with the CD and cassette editions adding "You Make Loving Fun", "Big Love", "Seven Wonders", "Oh Diane". Both "Seven Wonders" and "Oh Diane" were absent from the North American release.

In the United Kingdom, the promotional efforts for Greatest Hits included 10 and 30 second TV and radio advertisements, posters, in-store merchandising, and a press campaign.

== Track listing ==
=== US release ===
1. "Rhiannon" from Fleetwood Mac (Stevie Nicks) – 4:11
2. "Don't Stop" from Rumours (Christine McVie) – 3:12
3. "Go Your Own Way" from Rumours (Lindsey Buckingham) – 3:38
4. "Hold Me" from Mirage (C. McVie, Robbie Patton) – 3:45
5. "Everywhere" from Tango in the Night (C. McVie) – 3:42
6. "Gypsy" from Mirage (Nicks) – 4:24
7. "You Make Loving Fun" from Rumours (C. McVie) – 3:31
8. "As Long as You Follow" (previously unreleased) (C. McVie, Eddy Quintela) – 4:10*
9. "Dreams" from Rumours (Nicks) – 4:14
10. "Say You Love Me" from Fleetwood Mac (C. McVie) – 4:10
11. "Tusk" from Tusk (Buckingham) – 3:30
12. "Little Lies" from Tango in the Night (C. McVie, Quintela) – 3:38
13. "Sara" from Tusk (Nicks) – 6:22
14. "Big Love" from Tango in the Night (Buckingham) – 3:38
15. "Over My Head" from Fleetwood Mac (C. McVie) – 3:34
16. "No Questions Asked" (previously unreleased) (Nicks, Kelly Johnston) – 4:40*

One US reissue by WB as #R1 25801, does not include tracks 7, 14 or 15, and the order of the tracks on the back side is different.

=== European and Australian releases ===
1. "Rhiannon" – 4:11
2. "Go Your Own Way" – 3:37
3. "Don't Stop" – 3:11
4. "Gypsy" – 4:22
5. "Everywhere" – 3:41
6. "You Make Loving Fun" – 3:31
7. "Big Love" – 3:38
8. "As Long as You Follow" – 4:11*
9. "Say You Love Me" – 4:09
10. "Dreams" – 4:15
11. "Little Lies" – 3:37
12. "Oh Diane" from Mirage (Buckingham, Richard Dashut) – 2:33
13. "Sara" – 6:25
14. "Tusk" – 3:26
15. "Seven Wonders" from Tango in the Night (Sandy Stewart, Nicks) – 3:33
16. "Hold Me" – 3:44
17. "No Questions Asked" – 4:41*
- "As Long as You Follow" and "No Questions Asked" were new tracks at the time of the album's release. The former was released as a single to promote the album in November 1988, peaking at No. 66 in the UK and No. 43 in the US. "Hold Me" was also re-released in the UK with "No Questions Asked" as its B-side in February 1989.
- "You Make Loving Fun", "Big Love", "Oh Diane" and "Seven Wonders" are not included on the UK vinyl version, but are included on the cassette and CD formats. The LP contained 13 tracks.

== Personnel ==
Fleetwood Mac

- Lindsey Buckingham – lead and backing vocals, guitars, additional keyboards, percussion (except "As Long as You Follow" and "No Questions Asked"), banjo ("Say You Love Me")
- Stevie Nicks – lead and backing vocals, additional keyboards ("Sara")
- Billy Burnette – rhythm guitar, backing vocals ("As Long as You Follow" and "No Questions Asked")
- Rick Vito – lead guitar, backing vocals ("As Long as You Follow" and "No Questions Asked")
- Christine McVie – lead and backing vocals, keyboards, synthesizer
- John McVie – bass guitar
- Mick Fleetwood – drums, percussion

== Charts ==
=== Weekly charts ===
1988–1989 weekly chart performance for Greatest Hits
Chart (1988–1989)	Peak position
Australian Albums (ARIA)	3
Canada Top Albums/CDs (RPM)	11
Dutch Albums (Album Top 100)	3
European Albums (Music & Media)	4
German Albums (Offizielle Top 100)	9
Icelandic Albums (Tónlist)	6
Italian Albums (Musica e dischi)	19
New Zealand Albums (RMNZ)	1
Norwegian Albums (VG-lista)	11
Swedish Albums (Sverigetopplistan)	15
Swiss Albums (Schweizer Hitparade)	18
UK Albums (Official Charts)	3
US Billboard 200	14

1997 weekly chart performance for Greatest Hits
Chart (1997)	Peak position
Finnish Albums (Suomen virallinen lista)	24
US Top Catalog Albums (Billboard)	1

2006 weekly chart performance for Greatest Hits
Chart (2006)	Peak position
Irish Albums (IRMA)	7

2012 weekly chart performance for Greatest Hits
Chart (2012)	Peak position
Polish Albums (ZPAV)	46

2019–2026 weekly chart performance for Greatest Hits
Chart (2019–2026)	Peak position
Austrian Albums (Ö3 Austria)	48
Belgian Albums (Ultratop Flanders)	17
Belgian Albums (Ultratop Wallonia)	178
Canadian Albums (Billboard)	11
Croatian International Albums (HDU)	27
Greek Albums (IFPI)	3
Hungarian Physical Albums (MAHASZ)	5
Hungarian Vinyl Albums (MAHASZ)	4
US Billboard 200	13
US Indie Store Album Sales (Billboard)	4
US Top Rock Albums (Billboard)	4

=== Year-end charts ===
1988 weekly chart performance for Greatest Hits
Chart (1988)	Position
Dutch Albums (Album Top 100)	39
UK Albums (Gallup)	27

1989 year-end chart performance for Greatest Hits
Chart (1989)	Position
Australian Albums (ARIA)	31
Canada Top Albums/CDs (RPM)	62
Dutch Albums (Album Top 100)	8
European Albums (Music & Media)	53
German Albums (Offizielle Top 100)	43
New Zealand Albums (RMNZ)	19
US Billboard 200	72

2015 year-end chart performance for Greatest Hits
Chart (2015)	Position
US Billboard 200	71

2016 year-end chart performance for Greatest Hits
Chart (2016)	Position
US Billboard 200	173

2018 year-end chart performance for Greatest Hits
Chart (2018)	Position
US Top Rock Albums (Billboard)	78

2019 year-end chart performance for Greatest Hits
Chart (2019)	Position
US Top Rock Albums (Billboard)	45

2020 year-end chart performance for Greatest Hits
Chart (2020)	Position
US Top Rock Albums (Billboard)	17

2021 year-end chart performance for Greatest Hits
Chart (2021)	Position
Irish Vinyl Albums (IRMA)	6
US Billboard 200	135
US Top Rock Albums (Billboard)	16

2022 year-end chart performance for Greatest Hits
Chart (2022)	Position
Belgian Albums (Ultratop Flanders)	118

2023 year-end chart performance for Greatest Hits
Chart (2023)	Position
Belgian Albums (Ultratop Flanders)	129
US Billboard 200	135
US Top Rock Albums (Billboard)	28

2024 year-end chart performance for Greatest Hits
Chart (2024)	Position
Belgian Albums (Ultratop Flanders)	138
US Billboard 200	158

2025 year-end chart performance for Greatest Hits
Chart (2025)	Position
Belgian Albums (Ultratop Flanders)	154

== Certifications ==
Certifications for Greatest Hits
Region	Certification	Certified units/sales
Australia (ARIA)	9× Platinum	680,000
Belgium (BRMA)	Platinum	50,000^{*}
Denmark (IFPI Danmark)	2× Platinum	40,000^{‡}
France (SNEP)	2× Gold	200,000^{*}
Germany (BVMI)	Platinum	500,000^{^}
Hong Kong (IFPI Hong Kong)	Gold	10,000^{*}
Netherlands (NVPI)	Platinum	100,000^{^}
New Zealand (RMNZ)	11× Platinum	165,000^{^}
Spain (Promusicae)	Platinum	100,000^{^}
Switzerland (IFPI Switzerland)	Gold	25,000^{^}
United Kingdom (BPI)	3× Platinum	900,000^{^}
United States (RIAA)	8× Platinum	8,000,000^{^}
^{*} Sales figures based on certification alone.^{^} Shipments figures based on certification alone.^{‡} Sales+streaming figures based on certification alone.
