= Love Shines (song) =

1992 single by Fleetwood Mac

Single by Fleetwood Mac

from the album 25 Years – The Chain
- B-side: "The Chain" (alternate mix); "Not That Funny" (live); "Isn't It Midnight" (alternate version)
- Released: 1992
- Length: 4:53
- Label: Warner Bros.
- Songwriters: Christine McVie; Eddy Quintela
- Producer: Patrick Leonard

Fleetwood Mac singles chronology
| "Hard Feelings" (1990) | "Love Shines" (1992) | "Paper Doll" (1992) |

Music video
- "Love Shines" on YouTube

"Love Shines" is a song by British-American band Fleetwood Mac. The song was released as a single in 1992 by Warner Bros. to support the 25 Years – The Chain box set and was also one of the four new songs included on this collection. "Love Shines" was the first single released after the departure of vocalist Stevie Nicks and guitarist Rick Vito. The song was released as a single in Europe, but in North America and Australia, "Paper Doll" was released instead.

== Release and airplay ==
Warner Records released "Love Shines" in the United Kingdom on 25 January 1993 and included alternate mixes of Fleetwood Mac songs such as "The Chain" and "Isn't It Midnight" as its B-sides. In the 5 December 1992 edition of the UK Music Week publication, Alan Jones said that "Love Shines" would be released as a single "in the new year" for the purpose of aligning with potential television advertising. On the week dated 6 February 1993, "Love Shines" debuted at number 42 on Music Week's Top 50 Airplay chart. Later that month, "Love Shines" was one of the most added songs to European radio stations reporting to Music & Media, with a particular concentration in Denmark, Italy, the Netherlands and Sweden. It received 15 adds to these radio stations for the week dated 19 December 1992 and entered the EHR Hit Radio chart at No. 32, making it the highest debut of the week.

== Music video ==
The official music video features the band playing the song on top of a building in Hollywood, Los Angeles. It was the last music video recorded with the four-person lineup of Mick Fleetwood, John McVie, Christine McVie, and Billy Burnette.

== Track listings ==
- UK 7-inch and cassette single; German 7-inch single

A. "Love Shines" (album version) – 4:48
B. "The Chain" (alternate mix) – 4:20

- UK CD single
1. "Love Shines" (album version) – 4:48
2. "The Chain" (alternate mix) – 4:20
3. "Not That Funny" (live version) – 3:21
4. "Isn't It Midnight" (alternate version) – 4:02

== Personnel ==
- Christine McVie – keyboards, lead vocals
- Billy Burnette – electric guitar, Dobro, backing vocals
- John McVie – bass guitar
- Mick Fleetwood – drums, tambourine, maracas

== Charts ==
| Chart (1992–1993) | Peak position |
|---|---|
| European Hit Radio (Music & Media) | 16 |
| Europe Adult Contemporary (Music & Media) | 12 |
| Germany (GfK) | 51 |
| Netherlands (Dutch Top 40 Tipparade) | 14 |
| Netherlands (Single Top 100) | 82 |

== Release history ==
| Region | Date | Format(s) | Label(s) | Ref. |
|---|---|---|---|---|
| Germany | 1992 | 7-inch vinyl | Warner Bros. | |
| United Kingdom | 25 January 1993 | 7-inch vinyl; CD; cassette | Warner Bros. | |
