= Show-Biz Blues =

Compilation album by Fleetwood Mac
- Released: 26 June 2001
- Recorded: 1968–70
- Genre: Blues rock
- Label: Receiver Records

Professional ratings
Review scores
Source	Rating
Allmusic	2.5/5 stars

Show-Biz Blues: Fleetwood Mac 1968 to 1970 is an album by British blues rock band Fleetwood Mac, released in 2001. It was a compilation of outtakes and unreleased tracks from the band's early line-up, none of which had previously seen the light of day officially. Available on double vinyl LP and double CD, it came with a booklet of extensive notes and anecdotes, and was the companion release to The Vaudeville Years of Fleetwood Mac 1968–1970.

== Track listing ==
Disc One
No.	Title	Writer(s)	Date recorded	Length
1.	"Soul Dressing" ("Jazz Beat" BBC Session) (Booker T. & The M.G.'s cover)	Booker T. Jones, Steve Cropper, Al Jackson, Lewie Steinberg	1966-02-02	3:47
2.	"If You Want to Be Happy" ("Jazz Beat" BBC Session) (Jimmy Soul cover)	Frank Guida, Carmela Guida, Joseph Royster	1966-02-02	2:28
3.	"Outrage" ("Jazz Beat" BBC Session) (Booker T. & The M.G.'s cover)	William Allen Jr., Cropper, Jackson, Steinberg	1966-02-02	2:47
4.	"The Sun Is Shining" ("Top Gear" BBC Session) (Elmore James cover)	Elmore James	1968-01-16	3:02
5.	"Don't Be Cruel" ("Top Gear" BBC Session) (Elvis Presley cover)	Otis Blackwell, Elvis Presley	1968-01-16	1:40
6.	"I'm So Lonely and Blue" ("Nightride" BBC Session)	Jeremy Spencer	1968-04-16	3:53
7.	"How Blue Can You Get?" ("Nightride" BBC Session) (B.B. King cover)	Leonard Feather	1968-04-16	3:36
8.	"My Baby's Sweeter" ("Nightride" BBC Session) (Homesick James cover)	Homesick James	1968-04-16	3:38
9.	"Long Grey Mare" ("Nightride" BBC Session)	Peter Green	1968-04-16	1:58
10.	"Buzz Me Baby" ("Nightride" BBC Session) (B.B. King cover)	Fleecy Moore, Dave Dexter Jr.	1968-04-16	3:33
11.	"Mind of My Own" ("Top Gear" BBC Session)	Danny Kirwan	1968-08-26	2:59
12.	"I Have to Laugh" ("Top Gear" BBC Session) (Otis Rush cover)	Otis Rush, Dave Clark	1968-08-26	3:27
13.	"You're the One" ("Top Gear" BBC Session) (Buddy Holly cover)	Buddy Holly, Ray Corbin, Waylon Jennings	1968-08-26	2:05
14.	"Do You Give a Damn for Me" (Early version of "Show-Biz Blues", alternative take to Vaudeville Years)	Green	1969	3:58
15.	"Him and Me" (Early version of "Show-Biz Blues")	Green	1969	4:02
16.	"Show-Biz Blues" (Alternative take #2)	Green	1969	4:06
17.	"Fast Talking Woman Blues" (Remake of "Drifting", alternative take)	Green	1969-10	3:22
18.	"World in Harmony" (Alternative take #2)	Kirwan, Green	1970	3:24
19.	"Leaving Town Blues" ("Top Gear" BBC Session)	Green	1970-04-27	3:49

Tracks 1–3 are not performed by Fleetwood Mac, but by Peter B's Looners (credits below).

Track 8 is listed as "My Baby's Sweeter" (not by Sonny Boy Williamson but a Willie Dixon composition performed by Little Walter) but it actually is the Homesick James song "My Baby's Sweet", which they often played at concerts.

Disc Two
No.	Title	Writer(s)	Date recorded	Length
1.	"Black Magic Woman" (Live at the Boston Tea Party)	Green	1970-02-05	7:39
2.	"Jumping at Shadows" (Live at the Boston Tea Party) (Duster Bennett cover)	Anthony Bennett	1970-02-05	5:24
3.	"Rattlesnake Shake / Underway" (Live at the Paris Cinema, London)	Green	1970-04-09	14:06
4.	"Stranger Blues" (Live at the Paris Cinema, London) (Elmore James cover)	Elmore James, Morris Levy, Clarence Lewis	1970-04-09	4:15
5.	"World in Harmony" (Live at the Paris Cinema, London)	Kirwan, Green	1970-04-09	3:32
6.	"Tiger" (Live at the Paris Cinema, London) (Fabian cover)	Ollie Jones	1970-04-09	3:22
7.	"The Green Manalishi (With the Two Prong Crown)" (Live at the Paris Cinema, London)	Green	1970-04-09	15:15
8.	"Coming Your Way" (Live at the Paris Cinema, London)	Kirwan	1970-04-09	7:32
9.	"Great Balls of Fire" (Live at the Paris Cinema, London) (Jerry Lee Lewis cover)	Blackwell, Jack Hammer	1970-04-09	2:32
10.	"Twist and Shout" (Live at the Paris Cinema, London) (The Isley Brothers cover)	Phil Medley, Bert Russell	1970-04-09	7:45

- Disc 2 consists of live recordings.

== Credits ==
=== Peter B's Looners (1-1 to 1–3) ===
- Peter Bardens – keyboards
- Peter Green – guitar
- David Ambrose – bass guitar
- Mick Fleetwood – drums, percussion

=== Fleetwood Mac (remainder) ===
- Peter Green – guitar, vocals
- Jeremy Spencer – guitar, vocals
- Danny Kirwan – guitar, vocals (1–11 to end)
- John McVie – bass guitar
- Mick Fleetwood – drums, percussion
