= Brett-Livingstone Strong =

Australian-born artist (born 1953)

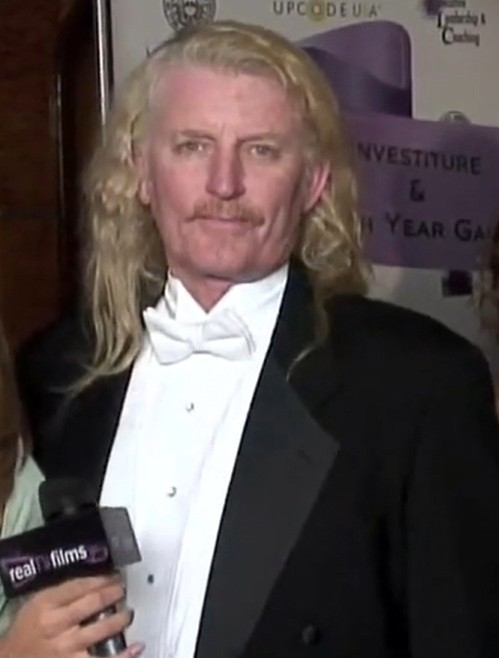
- Strong in 2009
- Born: Brett-Livingstone Strong; 31 October 1953 (age 73); Junee, Australia
- Known for: Sculpting, painting, archecture
- Notable work: United States Presidency Monument
- Awards: Spirit of America Presidential Award, Grammy, Knighthood.
- Patrons: Dr. Armand Hammer/Hammer Fine Art Museum

Brett-Livingstone Strong (born 31 October 1953) is an Australian-born artist, best known for his historic monumental sculptures and portraits of Hollywood celebrities.

== Career ==
In 1977, Strong arrived in the United States, he was sponsored by the Australian Trade Commission to present his first American art exhibition in San Francisco, California. In 1978, John Wayne sponsored Strong's US Green Card. Also that year Strong carved the portrait of Wayne's face in a 100+ ton boulder that had fallen onto the Pacific Coast Highway in Malibu. In 1978, he sold the sculpture for $1,13 million to an Arizona-based company and it resides in the library of the Lubbock Christian University in Lubbock, Texas.

In 1979, Strong created a life-size bronze statue of John Lennon entitled Imagine. He began work on the sculpture/statue of Lennon prior to the musician's death in 1980.

Strong was commissioned by Michael Jackson to paint his only portrait of Jackson entitled The Book which sold for $2.1 million to Hiromichi Saeki Corp. in 1990, making it the most money paid to a living artist for the sale of a portrait. This portrait is claimed to be the only portrait that Michael Jackson sat for an artist's rendering and made its first appearance since 1992 in July 2009. It was displayed to a public viewing in Harlem near the Apollo Theater. Strong was a close friend and only partner of Jackson in their artistic company titled the Jackson-Strong Alliance. Strong first met Jackson in 1979, their partnership lasted to his death in 2009. Strong's studio formally Jackson's fine art studio, houses a large collection of Jackson's fine art creations.

In the 1980s, Strong completed two monumental sculptural works for the National Monument to the US Constitution and The National Monument For The Bicentennial of The United States Presidency, commissioned by former Chief Justice Warren E. Burger and Ronald Reagan.

In the mid-1980s, Strong's painting Homage à Henri Rousseau became the album cover artwork for the 1987 Fleetwood Mac album Tango in the Night.

In the late 1990s Strong proposed a City of Angels Monument project designed to create a symbol for Los Angeles along the lines of New York's Statue of Liberty or Paris' Eiffel Tower.

After Michael Jackson's former wife Debbie Rowe had nominated Strong for knighthood, the Duke of Gardham made Strong a knight of the Imperial Orders of Constantine the Great and Saint Helen in October 2009, in recognition of Strong's charitable work for children.
