= Everywhere (Fleetwood Mac song) =

1987 single by Fleetwood Mac

Single by Fleetwood Mac

from the album Tango in the Night
- B-side: "When I See You Again"
- Released: November 1987
- Genre: Pop
- Length: 3:43
- Label: Warner Bros.
- Songwriter: Christine McVie
- Producers: Lindsey Buckingham; Richard Dashut

Fleetwood Mac UK singles chronology
"Family Man" (1987)	"Everywhere" (1987)	"Isn't It Midnight" (1988)

Fleetwood Mac US singles chronology
"Little Lies" (1987)	"Everywhere" (1987)	"Family Man" (1988)

Music video
- "Everywhere" on YouTube

"Everywhere" is a song by British-American rock band Fleetwood Mac from their 14th studio album, Tango in the Night (1987). The song was written by Christine McVie, who also performed lead vocals, and produced by Lindsey Buckingham and Richard Dashut. In the United States, "Everywhere" was released in November 1987 as the album's fourth single, while in the United Kingdom, it was issued on 21 March 1988 as the album's fifth single.

The single peaked at number 14 on the US Billboard Hot 100 and number one on the Adult Contemporary chart, remaining there for three weeks. In the United Kingdom, "Everywhere" peaked at number four on the UK Singles Chart and is certified 7× platinum by the British Phonographic Industry (BPI) for sales and streams of over 4.2 million units. "Everywhere" also reached number one in Belgium and on the Canadian adult contemporary chart and became a top-five hit in several other countries.

== Background and release ==
In the 2019 BBC Four documentary Fleetwood Mac's Songbird – Christine McVie, Richard Dashut, the co-producer of Tango in the Night, briefly talked about the intro: "That's a half-speed acoustic guitar and electric combined". McVie herself also talked about the song's intro: "He [Buckingham] slowed the tape down, really slowly, and played the parts slowly, and then when it came to the right speed, it sounded bloody amazing". An earlier version lacked harmonies that Nicks had recorded, leading to a heated argument.

A twelve-inch single was issued which featured an extended dance version and dub version. "Everywhere" also marked the first CD single release by the band in most territories. All of the formats included the B-side "When I See You Again", a song taken from Tango in the Night; the 12-inch format featured an extended mix of "Everywhere" and the mini-CD single contained the bonus tracks "Rhiannon" and "Say You Love Me" from Fleetwood Mac's self-titled tenth studio album, Fleetwood Mac (1975). The cover art for the single was created by Lindsey Loch.

== Reception ==
"Everywhere" has been widely acclaimed by music critics. Upon its release, Cashbox wrote that the song was replete with "dreamy pop hooks" and predicted that the single would "fare extremely well" on contemporary hit radio and adult contemporary radio formats. In The Guardian, Alexis Petridis dubbed it "peerless" and "bulletproof pop songwriting." Ivy Nelson from Pitchfork called "Everywhere" the best song on Tango in the Night, writing that the tune "responds with warmth, empathy, and buoyancy, describing a kind of devotion so deeply felt that it produces weightlessness in a person." Elsewhere, the publication ranked it among the 200 Best Songs of the 1980s, praising its "carefully crafted, spare, and meticulously produced" sound.

== Music videos ==
The music video for "Everywhere" was directed by Alex Proyas and is a visual depiction of the poem "The Highwayman" by Alfred Noyes. There are two versions of the video. One version shows bandmembers Christine McVie, John McVie, and Mick Fleetwood superimposed over the story while the other version does not feature the band at all. The video features six interior sets that were constructed over the span of two weeks.

== Track listings ==
7-inch and cassette single

A. "Everywhere" (LP version) – 3:41
B. "When I See You Again" (LP version) – 3:47

12-inch single

A1. "Everywhere" (extended version) – 5:40
A2. "Everywhere" (LP version) – 3:48
B1. "Everywhere" (dub) – 3:50
B2. "When I See You Again"

Mini-CD single

1. "Everywhere"
2. "When I See You Again" (LP version)
3. "Rhiannon"
4. "Say You Love Me"

== Personnel ==
- Christine McVie – lead and backing vocals, keyboards
- Lindsey Buckingham − guitars, keyboards, Fairlight CMI synthesizer, programming, backing vocals
- Stevie Nicks − backing vocals
- John McVie − bass guitar
- Mick Fleetwood – drums, percussion

== Charts ==
=== Weekly charts ===
Chart (1987–1988)	Peak position
Australia (Australian Music Report)	45
Belgium (Ultratop 50 Flanders)	1
Canada Top Singles (RPM)	29
Canada Adult Contemporary (RPM)	1
Europe (Eurochart Hot 100)	9
Ireland (IRMA)	2
Netherlands (Dutch Top 40)	3
Netherlands (Single Top 100)	4
New Zealand (Recorded Music NZ)	43
Panama (UPI)	4
South Africa (Springbok Radio)	13
UK Singles (Official Charts)	4
US Billboard Hot 100	14
US Adult Contemporary (Billboard)	1
US Mainstream Rock Airplay (Billboard)	22
US Cash Box Top 100	13
US Adult Contemporary (Radio & Records)	1
US AOR Tracks (Radio & Records)	21
US Contemporary Hit Radio (Radio & Records)	12

Chart (2013)	Peak position
Scottish Singles Sales (Official Charts)	13
UK Singles (Official Charts)	15

Chart (2016)	Peak position
Poland Airplay (ZPAV)	59

Chart (2022)	Peak position
Canadian Digital Song Sales (Billboard)	10
US Digital Song Sales (Billboard)	3
US Hot Rock & Alternative Songs (Billboard)	18
US Rock Digital Songs (Billboard)	1

Chart (2025–2026)	Peak position
Global 200 (Billboard)	188
Sweden (Sverigetopplistan)	39

=== Year-end charts ===
Chart (1988)	Position
Belgium (Ultratop)	6
Netherlands (Dutch Top 40)	7
Netherlands (Single Top 100)	12
UK Singles (OCC)	92
US Adult Contemporary (Billboard)	22
US Adult Contemporary (Radio & Records)	27

Chart (2021)	Position
UK Singles (OCC)	96

Chart (2022)	Position
UK Singles (OCC)	91
US Digital Song Sales (Billboard)	72

Chart (2023)	Position
UK Singles (OCC)	44

Chart (2024)	Position
UK Singles (OCC)	40

Chart (2025)	Position
UK Singles (OCC)	48

== Certifications ==
Region	Certification	Certified units/sales
Denmark (IFPI Danmark)	2× Platinum	180,000^{‡}
France (SNEP) 2017 remaster	Gold	100,000^{‡}
Italy (FIMI)	Gold	50,000^{‡}
New Zealand (RMNZ)	9× Platinum	270,000^{‡}
Spain (Promusicae)	Platinum	60,000^{‡}
United Kingdom (BPI)	7× Platinum	4,200,000^{‡}
^{‡} Sales+streaming figures based on certification alone.

== Moustache version ==
"Everywhere"

Single by Moustache featuring Melinda Jackson
- Released: May 2005
- Studio: iSPY (Sydney, Australia)
- Length: 3:22
- Label: Central Station
- Songwriter: Christine McVie
- Producer: Moustache

Music video
- "Everywhere" on YouTube

In 2005, "Everywhere" was covered by Australian musical duo Moustache (Michael Di Francesco and Richard Sanford), featuring singer Melinda Jackson on vocals. Released as a standalone single, this version peaked at number 19 on the Australian ARIA Singles Chart and number two on the ARIA Dance Chart in May 2005.

=== Track listing ===
Australian and New Zealand CD single

1. "Everywhere" (radio edit) – 3:22
2. "Everywhere" (Cabin Crew radio mix) – 3:26
3. "Everywhere" (extended 12-inch mix) – 7:43
4. "Everywhere" (Cabin Crew club remix) – 6:15
5. "Everywhere" (Cabin Crew dub mix) – 6:29
6. "Everywhere" (remix) – 7:43

=== Charts ===
Chart (2005)	Peak position
Australia (ARIA)	19
Australian Dance (ARIA)	2

== Niall Horan and Anne-Marie version ==
"Everywhere (BBC Children in Need)"

Single by Niall Horan and Anne-Marie
- Released: 19 November 2021
- Length: 2:51
- Songwriter: Christine McVie
- Producer: Steve Mac

Niall Horan singles chronology
"Our Song" (2021)	"Everywhere (BBC Children in Need)" (2021)	"Heaven" (2023)

Anne-Marie singles chronology
"Kiss My (Uh-Oh)" (2021)	"Everywhere (BBC Children in Need)" (2021)	"I Just Called" (2022)

"Everywhere" was recorded by Irish singer Niall Horan and English singer Anne-Marie and released on 19 November 2021 for that year's BBC Children in Need appeal, supported by BBC Radio 1 and BBC Radio 2.

=== Background ===
The song featured English singers Ed Sheeran on guitar, Griff on the synthesisers and Yungblud on the bass. Fleetwood Mac vocalist and keyboardist Christine McVie praised the cover saying, "I'm thrilled with this new version of 'Everywhere' and to be part of this year's Children in Need campaign." The song peaked at number 23 on the UK singles chart and at number 49 on the Irish Singles Chart.

=== Charts ===
Chart (2021–2022)	Peak position
Ireland (IRMA)	49
Netherlands (Dutch Top 40 Tiparade)	23
New Zealand Hot Singles (RMNZ)	13
UK Singles (Official Charts)	23

== Use in advertisements ==
In March 2013, after being featured in an advertisement for UK mobile phone provider 3, "Everywhere" re-entered the UK Singles Chart, rising to number 15.

Chevrolet included the song in a 2022 television commercial promoting its line of electric vehicles. This resulted in "Everywhere" reaching number one on Billboard's rock digital song sales chart in October, and number three in overall digital sales. Two years later, PayPal debuted its "biggest ad campaign to date" with Will Ferrell performing the song with slightly altered lyrics. The 60-second commercial debuted before the first ESPN broadcast of Monday Night Football of the 2024 season.
