= No Questions Asked (song) =

Promotional single by Fleetwood Mac

from the album Greatest Hits
- Released: November 1988
- Recorded: 1988
- Genre: Rock
- Length: 4:40
- Label: Warner Bros.
- Songwriters: Stevie Nicks, Kelly Johnston
- Producers: Fleetwood Mac, Greg Ladanyi

Fleetwood Mac singles chronology
"As Long as You Follow" (1988)	"No Questions Asked" (1988)	"Save Me" (1990)

"No Questions Asked" is a rock song performed by British-American music group Fleetwood Mac. Stevie Nicks wrote the lyrics around an instrumental track created by Kelly Johnston, and the song was produced by Greg Ladanyi. It was the first Fleetwood Mac song along with "As Long as You Follow to feature Billy Burnette and Rick Vito.

"Paper Doll", another song penned by Nicks, was originally slated to appear on the Greatest Hits compilation, but the band pulled it in favor of "No Questions Asked". The song received airplay on US album oriented rock stations beginning in November 1988 and began to appear on national airplay charts from Radio & Records and Billboard the following month. In the UK, "No Questions Asked" was issued as the B-side to the 1989 re-release of "Hold Me".

== Personnel ==
Fleetwood Mac

- Stevie Nicks – lead vocals
- Rick Vito – lead guitar, backing vocals
- Billy Burnette – guitar, backing vocals
- Christine McVie – keyboards, backing vocals
- John McVie – bass guitar
- Mick Fleetwood – drums

Additional Personnel

- Dan Garfield – keyboard programming

== Charts ==
Chart (1988)	Peak position
US Mainstream Rock (Billboard)	37
