= Tango in the Night =

Studio album by Fleetwood Mac
- Released: 13 April 1987
- Recorded: November 1985 – March 1987
- Studios: Rumbo Recorders and the Slope (Los Angeles, California)
- Genres: Pop rock; soft rock
- Length: 43:37
- Label: Warner Bros.
- Producers: Lindsey Buckingham; Richard Dashut

Fleetwood Mac chronology
Mirage (1982)	Tango in the Night (1987)	Greatest Hits (1988)

Singles from Tango in the Night
- 1. "Big Love" Released: March 1987; 2. "Seven Wonders" Released: June 1987; 3. "Little Lies" Released: August 1987; 4. "Everywhere" Released: November 1987 (US); 5. "Family Man" Released: November 1987 (UK); 6. "Isn't It Midnight" Released: June 1988

Tango in the Night is the fourteenth studio album by the British-American rock band Fleetwood Mac, released on 13 April 1987 by Warner Bros. Records. It is the fifth and final studio album with the band's most successful lineup of Lindsey Buckingham, Mick Fleetwood, Christine McVie, John McVie, and Stevie Nicks, though Christine McVie would make guest appearances on the band's 2003 album, Say You Will. This lineup did not reconvene again for another album until 1997's live album The Dance.

Produced by Buckingham with Richard Dashut, Tango in the Night began as one of Buckingham's solo projects, but in 1985, the production had morphed into Fleetwood Mac's next record. It contains several hit singles, including four US top 20 hits: "Big Love" (No. 5), "Seven Wonders" (No. 19), "Little Lies" (No. 4), and "Everywhere" (No. 14). Two additional songs, "Family Man" (No. 90) and "Isn't It Midnight", were released as singles to lower chart success. Tango in the Night has sold over 15 million copies worldwide. In March 2017, remastered deluxe editions of Tango in the Night were released, the first as a double-CD set and the second as a 3CD/1DVD/1-LP boxset.

== Background ==
After the completion of the Mirage Tour in 1982, four members of Fleetwood Mac released five solo albums, with varying degrees of success. Mick Fleetwood, Christine McVie, and Lindsey Buckingham each released one, while Stevie Nicks issued two. Buckingham described the band as being "a bit fragmented" during the mid-1980s.

In 1985, Christine McVie was hired to record a cover of Elvis Presley's "Can't Help Falling in Love" for the soundtrack of the movie A Fine Mess. Richard Dashut, who had engineered and produced Rumours, Tusk, and Mirage, was brought in to assist with the song's production, and Greg Droman served as the audio engineer. Buckingham, Fleetwood, and John McVie were enlisted to supply the instrumentation, and they recorded the song in August 1985. Reenergized by this effort, the band began plans for their next studio album the following month.

Buckingham was working on his third solo album with Droman during the initial stages of Tango in the Night and split his time between both projects. Fleetwood Mac originally intended to hire an outside producer for the recording sessions. They first worked with Nile Rodgers, but the collaboration fell through. Producer Mo Ostin then paired the band with Jason Corsaro, who had worked with the Power Station. The band booked Studio One and rehearsed for a week without Nicks, who was in Australia touring with Tom Petty and Bob Dylan. Corsaro also proved unsatisfactory, and Fleetwood Mac finally resorted to having Buckingham and Dashut produce, with Droman serving as engineer. Buckingham then paused progress on his solo album and transferred some of its planned tracks to Tango in the Night.

== Recording ==
After the release of Mirage, John McVie had spent much of his time sailing the Caribbean island of Saint Thomas and barely played bass in the years leading up to the making of Tango in the Night. In an attempt to be more productive in the studio, he quit drinking cold turkey, though this proved to be unsuccessful, and he grew concerned that he had lost his ability to play. Mick Fleetwood stated that his cocaine use during the recording of Tango in the Night was worse than the Rumours sessions; Buckingham placed a Winnebago in his driveway for Fleetwood and his friends when their drug use impeded productivity in the recording studio.

Three months were spent recording the backing tracks at Rumbo Recorders, later moving to Buckingham's newly built home studio, named the Slope, for the rest of the production. Dashut and Droman recalled that the album's recording sessions were particularly tedious, even by Fleetwood Mac standards. The band recorded certain instrumental parts while the tape was slowed down to half-speed to find suitable textures. This would double the song's duration, which made for "a brutal ten minutes to listen to", according to Droman. By recording in half-speed, they managed to make each song sound "open and airy". "When you record something really slow and you speed it up [back to normal speed], all the harmonics get shifted up. You end up with this high end, this tinkly little high end, that wouldn't exist [otherwise]. There's not another way you could get that, at least back then." Buckingham created most of the album's vocal harmonies through extensive overdubbing and also utilised the Fairlight CMI for additional sonic textures.

Although the record took eighteen months to complete, Stevie Nicks spent a total of two weeks in the studio with the band. She was promoting Rock a Little throughout this period and sent the band demos while she was on tour. One of those songs, "Welcome to the Room... Sara", was inspired by her thirty-day stay at the Betty Ford Center to overcome her cocaine addiction in October 1986 (Nicks used the pseudonym "Sara Anderson" when she checked into the facility).

When Nicks did go to the studio, she often felt unmotivated: "I can remember going up there and not being happy to even be there... I didn't go very often." Vocal sessions took place in Buckingham's master bedroom, where Nicks frequently recorded her parts for Buckingham and McVie's songs under the influence of alcohol; Buckingham deleted most of Nicks' vocals after she left the studio. She later said, "I'm not blaming him for that because I'm sure they totally sucked. Vocals done when you're crazy and drinking a cup of brandy probably aren't usually going to be great."

On certain songs, Buckingham "pull[ed] performances out of words and lines" from various sources to make some of the vocals sound like Nicks. During the album's sequencing, "When I See You Again" was planned to be the closing track, but the band deemed it "too down and depressing", so Christine McVie took an existing instrumental track from Buckingham and wrote some words to accompany it, resulting in the creation of "You and I, Part II".

== Composition ==
Some of Buckingham's compositions on Tango in the Night, including "Big Love" and "Family Man", were originally developed for his shelved solo album. These songs were mostly complete by the time Buckingham presented them to the band, although he recalled that "Family Man" was "sweetened up" during the mixing process. The band also sifted through Buckingham's demos and selected "Caroline", which he had written a few years prior. McVie composed and recorded several of her demos on a 16-track machine at her home studio.

Three songs on the album were co-written by Buckingham and Christine McVie. One of those songs, "Mystified", began with a melody from McVie, which Buckingham further developed at his home studio. McVie remarked that the two "didn't sit down at a piano and decide the chords together" but believed that the creative process during Tango in the Night was more collaborative than their past efforts.

== Outtakes ==
Four songs from the Tango in the Night sessions did not make the final album cut and subsequently became B-sides. "You and I (Part I)" was the B-side to the single release of "Big Love". "Seven Wonders" was released with the Nicks-penned instrumental track "Book of Miracles" as its B-side. This eventually became the song "Juliet" on Nicks' 1989 solo album, The Other Side of the Mirror. McVie's "Ricky" was the B-side to "Little Lies" and Buckingham's "Down Endless Street" was issued as the B-side to "Family Man". All these tracks would eventually be released in the deluxe version of the album, with "You and I" parts I and II being combined into one song on disc two of the collection.

Nicks contributed three additional songs that failed to make the final album. "What Has Rock & Roll Ever Done for You?" was considered, but it was replaced by "When I See You Again". "Ooh My Love", like "Juliet", eventually made its way onto The Other Side of the Mirror (with its demo also being included on the deluxe edition of Tango in the Night). The band shelved "Ooh My Love" after Nicks realised that the instrumental track she acquired from Mike Campbell was intended for Tom Petty. The third song, titled, "Joan of Arc", remains unreleased. "I still want to record it", she explained. "The song has its really good moments but it's not good enough to go out as that version."

Two tracks, both co-written by McVie and Buckingham, also failed to appear on the final product: "Where We Belong", which incorporates Buckingham's "folksy fingerpicking" and McVie's "brilliant pop simplicity", was written as a duet but was later abandoned in favour of other songs. The other, "Special Kind of Love", was described by Pitchfork as a "completely developed Buckingham song". Both tracks later appeared on the deluxe edition of Tango in the Night.

== Cover art ==
The album's cover is a painting by Australian artist Brett-Livingstone Strong that was hanging in Buckingham's house. Titled "Homage à Henri Rousseau", it is an homage to the 19th-century French painter Henri Rousseau, emulating his colorful jungle theme on works such as The Snake Charmer and The Repast of the Lion.

According to Paolo Ragusa of Consequence, the painting mimics Rousseau's "studious approach to depicting motion and activity within a still, naturalistic container". He notes that although "the jungle flora, the twinkling water, and the distant animals" evoke a sense of "dreamy wanderlust and desire", the image is "frozen and vast", as though "what can disturb its peace is the arrival of a warm breeze". Similarly, Pitchfork's Ivy Nelson described the artwork as "so lush and romantic that it walks a fine line between formal elegance and kitsch, blending the terrestrial with the celestial". She regarded it as an "accurate illustration" of the album's sound design and of the "glitterings and humid shimmers that Buckingham placed in the songs".

The painting was also used as the cover art for "Big Love", the album's lead single.

== Release ==
Tango in the Night was released on 13 April 1987. To promote the album, MTV aired a series of interviews with the band during an event dubbed the "Mac Attack promotional weekend", during which the music video for "Big Love" was premiered. Shortly after the release of Tango in the Night, a band meeting was held at Christine McVie's house to discuss the accompanying tour. During the meeting, Buckingham announced his departure, which infuriated Nicks. She physically attacked him, and the ensuing fight between the two spilled into the street.

Fleetwood noted that the album "was well received. Somewhat sadly, the kudos of that was never really fully attributed to Lindsey because he wasn't present... He was coerced and persuaded to do that album—mainly by me. And, to his credit, he put aside everything that he'd dreamt of doing, including making his own album, for Fleetwood Mac, but then realised that he'd made a mistake... Lindsey was not being heard. We just didn't get it."

Buckingham partially attributed his decision to leave Fleetwood Mac to the rigours of touring, which he believed would have exacerbated the interpersonal turbulence experienced in the studio. He later said, "Compared to making an album, in my experience, going on the road will multiply the craziness by times five. I just wasn't up for that." He later reflected that at the time of the album's release, "everybody was leading their lives in a way that they would not be too proud of today". Following Buckingham's departure, guitarists and vocalists Rick Vito and Billy Burnette were hired to replace him on the subsequent tour, and they would remain part of the band's lineup for the next album, Behind the Mask (1990).

=== Deluxe edition ===
A deluxe edition of Tango in the Night was issued on 31 March 2017, to celebrate the album's 30th anniversary. Included in the set were three CDs, divided into the original album with remastered sound, rare and unreleased recordings, and 12" remixes; a 180-gram vinyl LP; and a DVD, with different music videos and a high-resolution stereo version of the album.

Disc two of the collection features the B-sides "Ricky", "Down Endless Street", and "Book of Miracles"; both halves of "You and I", released and combined for the first time; and demos, alternate versions, and other recordings. The third disc features multiple remixes of "Big Love", "Seven Wonders", "Little Lies", "Family Man", and "Everywhere", either done by Arthur Baker or John "Jellybean" Benitez.

== Critical reception ==
Professional ratings
Review scores
Source	Rating
AllMusic	3.5/5 stars
Blender	4/5 stars
Chicago Sun-Times	3/4 stars
The Guardian	4/5 stars
Los Angeles Times	4/4 stars
Mojo	4/5 stars
Pitchfork	8.7/10
The Rolling Stone Album Guide	2.5/5 stars
Sounds	2/5 stars
The Village Voice	B+

Tango in the Night received mixed reviews upon release. Billboard called Buckingham "the driving force" behind the album and said that the other songwriters offered "impressive" material. They also thought that the album lacked "obvious single choices". Cashbox described it as a showcase of the band's "progressive vision of pop craftsmanship".

Steve Hochman of the Los Angeles Times singled out Buckingham's production work, saying that "relatively conventional material [such] as McVie's straight rocker, 'Isn't It Midnight' and Nicks' dreamy 'When I See You Again' benefit from the subtly bizarre undercurrents Buckingham creates." Robert Christgau thought that the album was an improvement over Mirage but failed to live up to the quality of the band's 1975 eponymous release and Rumours. Peter Kane of Sounds was more critical of the album, saying that the band was "going through the motions" with "puerile lyrics and little twiddly keyboard hooks instead of actual tunes."

Alexis Petridis of The Guardian wrote that the album "seems even more deserving of the 'flawed masterpiece' tag than Tusk". Ivy Nelson of Pitchfork was complimentary of Buckingham and McVie's songs but reserved some criticism for Nicks, saying, "Her voice, invariably hoarse after years of cocaine abuse, often warps or fails the already incomplete material." Mojo described the album as "a perfect Mac showcase for McVie and Buckingham's musical partnership". Alex Henderson of AllMusic praised Buckingham's contributions to the album, saying that his "thoughtful use of synthesizers were a major asset" and that he "consistently [brought] out the best in his colleagues on this superb album".

== Commercial performance ==
Tango in the Night is the band's second-biggest-selling studio album after the phenomenally successful Rumours, which was released ten years earlier. The intervening albums, Tusk (1979) and Mirage (1982), although big sellers in key territories, had not matched their predecessor's success. Tango in the Night was a worldwide hit, with several singles gaining global popularity. Six weeks after its release, the album had sold 1.5 million copies internationally.

Tango in the Night was a success in the United States, where it peaked at No. 7 on the Billboard 200 for three weeks, spending more than seven months within the top 20 and more than ten months within the top 40. It was certified 3× Platinum in October 2000 for selling three million copies. Four singles reached the Billboard top 20: "Big Love" (No. 5), "Little Lies" (No. 4), "Everywhere" (No. 14), and "Seven Wonders" (No. 19).

The album was particularly successful in the UK, where it reached No. 1 three times during 1987–88 for a total of five weeks and spent more than eight months within the top 10 of the UK albums chart. It is the seventh-biggest-selling record of the 1980s in the UK, being certified 9 × Platinum (2.7 million copies), and it is still currently one of the UK's top 100 best-selling albums of all time. Three singles were top 10 hits in Britain: "Big Love" (No. 9), "Little Lies" (No. 5), and "Everywhere" (No. 4). A total of six singles were eventually taken from Tango in the Night over a period of fifteen months. The record spent 115 weeks in the top 75 of the UK Albums Chart.

"Big Love", "Seven Wonders", "Little Lies", "Family Man", and "Everywhere" were all released as extended 12" remixes in most territories. Christine McVie's "Little Lies" and "Everywhere" in particular appear on several 1980s compilation albums.

== Track listing ==
Side one
No.	Title	Writer(s)	Lead vocals	Length
1.	"Big Love"	Lindsey Buckingham	Buckingham	3:37
2.	"Seven Wonders"	Sandy Stewart; Stevie Nicks	Nicks	3:38
3.	"Everywhere"	Christine McVie	C. McVie	3:41
4.	"Caroline"	Buckingham	Buckingham	3:50
5.	"Tango in the Night"	Buckingham	Buckingham	3:56
6.	"Mystified"	Buckingham; C. McVie	C. McVie	3:06

Side two
No.	Title	Writer(s)	Lead vocals	Length
1.	"Little Lies"	C. McVie; Eddy Quintela	C. McVie	3:38
2.	"Family Man"	Buckingham; Richard Dashut	Buckingham	4:01
3.	"Welcome to the Room... Sara"	Nicks	Nicks	3:37
4.	"Isn't It Midnight"	C. McVie; Quintela; Buckingham	C. McVie	4:06
5.	"When I See You Again"	Nicks	Nicks with Buckingham	3:47
6.	"You and I, Part II"	Buckingham; C. McVie	Buckingham	2:40
Total length:				43:37

=== Deluxe edition ===
This edition includes three CDs. The first one consists of a 2017 remaster of the original album; the second one of bonus, rare, or unreleased recordings; and the third one of remixes of most of the album's singles.

The information on disc two has been adapted from Fleetwood Mac's official website.

Disc two: B-Sides, Outtakes, Sessions
No.	Title	Writer(s)	Lead vocals	Length
1.	"Down Endless Street" (B-side of "Family Man")	Lindsey Buckingham	Buckingham	4:28
2.	"Special Kind of Love" (demo)	Buckingham	Buckingham	2:53
3.	"Seven Wonders" (early version)	Sandy Stewart; Stevie Nicks	Nicks	4:34
4.	"Tango in the Night" (demo)	Buckingham	Buckingham	4:41
5.	"Mystified" (alternate version)	Buckingham; Christine McVie	C. McVie	3:27
6.	"Book of Miracles" (instrumental; B-side of "Seven Wonders")	Buckingham; Nicks		4:30
7.	"Where We Belong" (demo)	Buckingham; C. McVie	Buckingham with C. McVie	2:52
8.	"Ricky" (B-side of "Little Lies")	C. McVie; Buckingham	C. McVie	4:25
9.	"Juliet" (run-through)	Nicks	Nicks	5:04
10.	"Isn't it Midnight" (alternate mix)	C. McVie; Eddy Quintela; Buckingham	C. McVie	3:39
11.	"Ooh My Love" (demo)	Nicks; Rick Nowels	Nicks	3:52
12.	"Mystified" (instrumental demo)	Buckingham; C. McVie		3:27
13.	"You and I, Part I & II" (full version)	Buckingham; C. McVie	Buckingham	6:26
Total length:				54:18

== Personnel ==
Fleetwood Mac

- Lindsey Buckingham – vocals, guitars, keyboards, Fairlight CMI, bass, percussion, drum programming
- Stevie Nicks – vocals
- Christine McVie – vocals, keyboards, synthesizers
- John McVie – bass guitar
- Mick Fleetwood – drums, percussion

Production

- Lindsey Buckingham – producer, arrangements, additional engineer, cover concept
- Richard Dashut – producer, cover concept
- Greg Droman – engineer
- Stephen Marcussen – mastering (at Precision Lacquers, Hollywood, California)
- John Courage – studio coordinator
- Roy Hopper; Ray Lindsey; Steve Matteucci – studio crew
- Brett-Livingstone Strong – cover painting ("Homage à Henri Rousseau")
- Greg Gorman – cover photography
- Jeri Heiden – art direction

== Charts ==
=== Weekly charts ===
Weekly chart performance for Tango in the Night
Chart (1987–1988)	Peak position
Argentinian Albums	19
Australian Albums (Kent Music Report)	5
Austrian Albums (Ö3 Austria)	23
Canada Top Albums/CDs (RPM)	5
Dutch Albums (Album Top 100)	2
European Albums (Music & Media)	6
Finnish Albums (Suomen virallinen lista)	3
French Albums (IFOP)	25
German Albums (Offizielle Top 100)	2
Italian Albums (Musica e dischi)	11
Japanese Albums (Oricon)	14
New Zealand Albums (RMNZ)	9
Norwegian Albums (VG-lista)	10
Spanish Albums (AFYVE)	34
Swedish Albums (Sverigetopplistan)	1
Swiss Albums (Schweizer Hitparade)	7
UK Albums (Official Charts)	1
US Billboard 200	7
US Cash Box Top 200 Albums	3

Weekly chart performance for Tango in the Night (2017 reissue)
Chart (2017)	Peak position
Belgian Albums (Ultratop Flanders)	44
Belgian Albums (Ultratop Wallonia)	62
Dutch Albums (Album Top 100)	35
Irish Albums (Official Charts)	42
Scottish Albums (Official Charts)	17
UK Albums (Official Charts)	23
US Billboard 200	144
US Top Catalog Albums (Billboard)	34
US Top Rock Albums (Billboard)	21
US Indie Store Album Sales (Billboard)	6

=== Year-end charts ===
1987 year-end chart performance for Tango in the Night
Chart (1987)	Position
Australian Albums (Kent Music Report)	6
Canada Top Albums/CDs (RPM)	10
Dutch Albums (Album Top 100)	11
European Albums (Music & Media)	8
German Albums (Offizielle Top 100)	9
New Zealand Albums (RMNZ)	16
UK Albums (Gallup)	6
US Billboard 200	40
US Cash Box Top 200 Albums	7

1988 year-end chart performance for Tango in the Night
Chart (1988)	Position
Australian Albums (Australian Music Report)	40
Canada Top Albums/CDs (RPM)	85
Dutch Albums (Album Top 100)	1
European Albums (Music & Media)	9
German Albums (Offizielle Top 100)	11
UK Albums (Gallup)	9
US Billboard 200	49

=== Decade-end charts ===
Decade-end chart performance for Tango in the Night
Chart (1980–1989)	Position
Australian Albums (Kent Music Report)	33
UK Albums (Gallup)	7

== Certifications and sales ==
Certifications and sales for Tango in the Night
Region	Certification	Certified units/sales
Australia (ARIA)	4× Platinum	300,000
Canada (Music Canada)	5× Platinum	500,000^{^}
Denmark (IFPI Danmark)	Platinum	20,000^{‡}
Germany (BVMI)	2× Platinum	1,000,000^{^}
Hong Kong (IFPI Hong Kong)	Gold	10,000^{*}
Italy	—	100,000
Netherlands (NVPI)	Platinum	100,000^{^}
New Zealand (RMNZ)	Platinum	15,000^{^}
Spain (Promusicae)	Platinum	100,000^{^}
Switzerland (IFPI Switzerland)	Platinum	50,000^{^}
United Kingdom (BPI)	9× Platinum	2,700,000^{‡}
United States (RIAA)	3× Platinum	3,000,000^{^}
Summaries
Worldwide	—	15,000,000
^{*} Sales figures based on certification alone.^{^} Shipments figures based on certification alone.^{‡} Sales+streaming figures based on certification alone.
