= Big Love (Fleetwood Mac song) =

Single by Fleetwood Mac

from the album Tango in the Night
- B-side: "You and I, Part I"
- Released: 23 March 1987
- Recorded: 1986–1987
- Genre: Pop rock; soft rock
- Length: 3:41
- Label: Warner Bros.
- Songwriter: Lindsey Buckingham
- Producers: Lindsey Buckingham; Richard Dashut

Fleetwood Mac singles chronology
"Can't Go Back" (1982)	"Big Love" (1987)	"Seven Wonders" (1987)

Music video
- "Big Love" on YouTube

"Big Love" is a song written by Lindsey Buckingham and performed by British-American rock band Fleetwood Mac. The song first appeared on the band's 1987 album Tango in the Night. The song was the first single to be released from the album, reaching number five in the US and number nine in the UK. The single was also a hit on the American dance charts, where it peaked at number seven.

A 12-inch version featured an extended dance mix, with added vocals by Stevie Nicks. While the 12-inch version in some territories included "You & I, Part II" from the Tango in the Night album, the 7-inch version and 12-inch version in other territories included a non-album track, "You & I, Part I". A limited edition 12-inch picture disc was released in the UK, as well as a double 7-inch pack that included the "Big Love" single, and an exclusive 7-inch featuring "The Chain" as an A-side. "Big Love" became a standard of the Balearic beat dance sound, and the object of an extended remix by the DJ Arthur Baker.

== Background ==
In 1985, Buckingham began compiling material for a third solo album and eventually amassed around 50 songs during this time. One of those songs was "Big Love", which Buckingham intended to include on his solo album. However, Fleetwood Mac was also creating a new album at the time, so Buckingham abandoned his solo project and transferred "Big Love" to Tango in the Night. "My choice was to keep making the solo record and walk in as a cameo and have cameo producers, or just surrender to the situation and say there will be more songs later. And I chose the latter."

"Big Love" was nearly complete by the time Fleetwood Mac began work on Tango in the Night, so the band largely left Buckingham's demo untouched for the final release. Buckingham performed the oh-ah vocals himself by sampling his voice through the use of a variable speed oscillator (VS0). "It was odd," he said, "that so many people wondered if it was Stevie on there with me." The song possesses a I-VII-VI-VII chord progression in the verses and a IV-V-I dominant sequence in the chorus. Musically, "Big Love" is oriented around the main guitar riff, bass guitar, and a mixture of programmed and live drums. The lyrics relate to skepticism of entering a romantic relationship.

The song originally was about isolation, and it was about the fact that I was living up in Bel Air, Los Angeles at the time in this house on a hill, with a view of downtown, and I had my studio there, and I was all set to go. But I was also not attached at that time. And so the chorus [is] basically saying, looking out for love. But it doesn’t say that I'm looking for love.

== Release ==
"Big Love" was released as the lead single from Tango in the Night on 23 March 1987 with "You & I, Part I" as its B-side. "You & I, Part I" was another song written by Buckingham during the Tango in the Night sessions, although it did not appear on the final album. Warner Records also issued a limited edition CD of the single exclusively for radio purposes. In the United States, the song debuted at No. 52 on the 28 March 1987 edition of the Billboard Hot 100. That same week, it received 143 adds to playlists, making it the most added song on radio that week. The song entered the top 40 on the week dated 11 April 1987 and peaked at number five on the 30th of May. It spent a total of 16 weeks in the top 100, 11 of which were in the top 40.

The song also received airplay on album oriented rock radio stations in the United States. During its first week of airplay, 93 percent of album oriented rock stations reporting to Radio & Records had added the song to their playlists. In April 1987, the song peaked at No. 2 on the Billboard Album Rock Track chart and spent a total of ten weeks on the listing.

== Acoustic version ==
After Buckingham left Fleetwood Mac in 1987 (shortly after Tango in the Night was released), the band did not perform "Big Love" live until his return in 1997. Buckingham decided to rework the song by orienting the arrangement around the vocals and a single guitar, which he said "became the template idea for quite a few other songs to follow". Buckingham performed this acoustic version of "Big Love" on his first solo tour in 1992–1993 and described the rendition as "Leo Kottke meets classical on acid." Buckingham felt that this acoustic rendition made the song "more quintessential" and "powerful" than the original arrangement, which started as "an ensemble piece".

When Buckingham played "Big Love" live on his 2012 solo tour, he used a gutted Gibson Chet Atkins SST with a capo on the fourth fret and a synth pickup. A live rendition of the song recorded in Des Moines, Iowa on September 1, 2012 was made available in advance of Buckingham's digital exclusive One Man Show album. Rolling Stone described this rendition as featuring "fevered strumming at the outset and impassioned vocals throughout."

Buckingham has performed the song on solo tours as well as Fleetwood Mac tours. In 1997, he performed the acoustic rendition of "Big Love" on Fleetwood Mac's live album The Dance. The song was also played during the band's 2014–2015 On With the Show Tour. During Fleetwood Mac's performance on 27 May 2015 at The O2 Arena, Leonie Cooper of NME reported that drops of blood were present on Buckingham's guitar due to the intensity of his playing. Buckingham commented that he "made his fingers bleed on numerous occasions" playing the song live. For his 2021 solo tour, Buckingham requested an additional two weeks of rehearsal to practice the acoustic guitar part for "Big Love". The song also appeared on the second volume of Cameron Crowe's Elizabethtown film soundtrack.

== Music video ==
Daniel Kleinman directed the music video for "Big Love", which was released in April 1987. Portions of the music video were filmed at Kimberly Crest in Redlands, California. Tim Clawson, who produced the music video through Limelight Productions, scouted potential locations in Southern California before selecting Kimberly Crest, which he felt provided the "perfect atmosphere" for the song. The filming at Kimberly Crest was completed in one day, with the remaining footage being shot at a beach location and a sound stage. Some of the footage for the music video was also filmed in Hawaii.

MTV previewed the music video during a promotional event titled "Mac Attack", which also featured interviews from the band. The music video takes place in a mansion and utilises a tracking shot technique that follows the band throughout various rooms of the facility. To create the tracking shot, a small crane holding a camera was placed onto a track installed by technicians. He described this effect as resembling a "giant pullback" that created the impression of being transported backwards through different passageways and objects. For the filming at Kimberly Crest, the band members were positioned under facility's main arbor while wearing black outfits with white shirts. Clawson described his approach in shooting the music video with The San Bernardino Sun.

This is a bit different from most videos where you shoot several short scenes and splice them together. This is only going to have 10 shots. Every shot has to be exceptional. We're going to spend four days shooting this, but it's going to end up only being three minutes.

The music video opens with a shot of the mansion and pans out to reveal members of the band playing their instruments, beginning with Mick Fleetwood on drums. Steve Spiller, who at the time was the executive director at Kimberly Crest, intended for Nicks to play a tambourine during the filming of the music video, but he encountered difficulties obtaining one. During the last segment of the song, the video is played backwards in a fast-forwarded form.

== Critical reception ==
In its 28 March 1987 publication, Billboard earmarked the song as one of its pop picks, a term designated to singles with "the greatest chart potential" and said that the song "hops with nervous Buckingham rhythms." Cash Box called it a "perfect blend of rock experimentation and pure pop sensibility." Jerry Smith of Music Week was more critical of the song and dismissed it as a "torpid dirge". Peter Kane of Sounds said that the song was "built around some rather unpleasant grunting noises, presumably suggesting some sort of orgiastic frenzy."

The Guardian and Paste ranked the song number 18 and number 19 respectively on their lists of the 30 greatest Fleetwood Mac songs. Some music critics, including Matthew Lindsay of The Quietus, found similarities between "Big Love" and Kate Bush's song "Running Up That Hill". Mark Blake noted that both songs began with a sustained reversed cymbal crash and a "hypnotic mechanized" programmed drum beat.

== Track listings ==
UK 7" single (Warner Brothers Records W 8398)

1. "Big Love" – 3:37
2. "You and I, Part I" – 3:09

UK 12" single (Warner Brothers Records W 8398 T)

1. "Big Love" (Extended Remix) – 6:42
2. "You and I, Part I" – 3:09

US 12" single (Warner Brothers Records 0-20683)

1. "Big Love" (Extended Remix) – 6:42
2. "Big Love" (House on the Hill Dub) – 3:03
3. "Big Love" (Piano Dub) – 6:36
4. "You and I, Part II" – 2:40

== Personnel ==
- Lindsey Buckingham – vocals, guitars, Fairlight CMI Synthesizer, keyboards, drum and percussion programming
- Mick Fleetwood – drums
- John McVie – bass guitar
- Stevie Nicks – vocals (12" single extended remix only)

== Charts ==
=== Weekly charts ===
Weekly chart performance for "Big Love"
Chart (1987)	Position
Australia (Kent Music Report)	16
Belgium (Ultratop 50 Flanders)	8
Canada Top Singles (RPM)	12
Europe (European Hot 100 Singles)	7
European Airplay (Music & Media)	5
Ireland (IRMA)	8
Netherlands (Dutch Top 40)	4
Netherlands (Single Top 100)	8
New Zealand (Recorded Music NZ)	29
South Africa (Springbok Radio)	11
Sweden (Sverigetopplistan)	14
UK Singles (Official Charts)	9
US Billboard Hot 100	5
US Adult Contemporary (Billboard)	23
US Dance Club Songs (Billboard) Remix	7
US Dance Singles Sales (Billboard) Remix	11
US Mainstream Rock Airplay (Billboard)	2
US Cash Box Top 100	7
US Adult Contemporary (Radio & Records)	21
US AOR Tracks (Radio & Records)	2
US Contemporary Hit Radio (Radio & Records)	4
West Germany (GfK)	17

=== Year-end charts ===
Year-end chart performance for "Big Love"
Chart (1987)	Position
Belgium (Ultratop)	60
Canada Top Singles (RPM)	92
Europe (European Hot 100 Singles)	86
Netherlands (Dutch Top 40)	35
Netherlands (Single Top 100)	63
US Billboard Hot 100	81
US AOR Tracks (Radio & Records)	66
US Contemporary Hit Radio (Radio & Records)	46

== Certifications ==
Certifications and sales for "Big Love"
Region	Certification	Certified units/sales
New Zealand (RMNZ)	Platinum	30,000^{‡}
United Kingdom (BPI)	Gold	400,000^{‡}
^{‡} Sales+streaming figures based on certification alone.
