= Isn't It Midnight =

Single by Fleetwood Mac

from the album Tango in the Night
- B-side: "Mystified"
- Released: 6 June 1988 (UK)
- Recorded: 1987
- Genre: Pop rock; hard rock
- Length: 4:09
- Label: Warner Bros.
- Songwriters: Christine McVie, Eddie Quintela, Lindsey Buckingham
- Producers: Lindsey Buckingham, Richard Dashut

Fleetwood Mac singles chronology
"Everywhere" (1987)	"Isn't It Midnight" (1988)	"As Long as You Follow" (1988)

"Isn't It Midnight" is a song by the British-American rock band Fleetwood Mac, from their 1987 studio album Tango in the Night. The song was co-written and sung by Christine McVie, with contributions from Lindsey Buckingham and McVie's then-husband Eddie Quintela. "Isn't It Midnight" was the sixth and final single to be released from Tango in the Night in 1988. The cover art for the single features the portrait of Mademoiselle Caroline Rivière, which was created in 1805 by Jean-Auguste-Dominique Ingres, who was a French neoclassical artist. The verse is in E Aeolian with a i-bVII-i-i progression, while the chorus is in B Aeolian, with a i-bVI-bVII-i progression.

== Composition and release ==
The lyrics to "Isn't it Midnight" relate to difficulties in establishing a bond with a romantic partner, who is described in the song as "cool, calm and collected". Christine McVie explained that the song "goes back directly to a guy that I met a long time ago; it was a concrete situation that didn't work out." Musically, the song is built around a guitar riff played by Lindsey Buckingham, a bass guitar played by John McVie, and drumming from Mick Fleetwood. Synthesisers are used comparatively sparingly on the album version, which primarily provide additional chordal accompaniment and a melodic sequence found on the chorus. Buckingham's provided additional vocals on the song, specifically "the face of a pretty girl" lyric, which Mike Mettler of Sound & Vision described as being delivered in a "foreboding monotone".

In the United Kingdom, "Isn't It Midnight" was released as the follow-up to "Everywhere"; it charted at a peak position of number 60 on 18 June 1988. The song performed better in Ireland, where it reached the top 30, peaking at number 23. The song was also released as a promotional single in the United States as an original album cut. The Hard Report mentioned in its 26 June 1987 publication that "Isn't it Midnight" had received adds on several album oriented rock adio stations, including WRXK, WQBK, and WHJY. The song reached number 14 on the Billboard Mainstream Rock chart in August 1987.

"Isn't It Midnight" was the second official Fleetwood Mac song to be released on the 3-inch CD single format as well as being issued on 7-inch and 12-inch vinyl. All of the formats included the Tango in the Night track "Mystified", and the CD and 12-inch included the bonus tracks "Say You Love Me" (from 1975; it had previously been included as a bonus track on the "Everywhere" CD single) and "Gypsy" (from the 1982 album Mirage).

"Isn't it Midnight" was featured consistently throughout Fleetwood Mac's Tango in the Night and Behind the Mask concert tours, though it was not played after 1990 until 2018 during the An Evening with Fleetwood Mac tour.

== Critical reception ==
In a retrospective review, Alexis Petridis of The Guardian described "Isn't It Midnight" as an example of McVie's "bullet-proof" songwriting, a "confection of booming drums, precise, tinkly synth and wailing guitar solos that sounds as if it’s just waiting to appear in the background of a film starring Ally Sheedy." David Bowling of Blogcritics Magazine also grouped it as one of Christine McVie's strongest songs, saying that McVie delivers an atypical vocal in a song "about as hard as this incarnation of Fleetwood Mac gets".

Writing for Sound & Vision, Mike Mettler called "Isn't It Midnight" "the Side 2 linchpin" and that McVie's "layered observational tone practically lives in the clouds". Upon reflection, Stevie Nicks considers the track, along with Buckingham's own songs on the album, as a representative of his best contributions to any Fleetwood Mac album.

== Track listings ==
UK 7-inch single – Warner: W 7860

- A1. "Isn't It Midnight" – 4:06
- B1. "Mystified" – 3:06

UK 12-inch single – Warner: W 7860 (T)

- A1. "Isn't It Midnight" – 4:06
- A2. "Mystified" – 3:06
- B1. "Say You Love Me" – 4:11
- B2. "Gypsy" – 4:24

== Personnel ==
- Christine McVie – lead and backing vocals, synthesizers
- Lindsey Buckingham – guitars, Fairlight CMI, backing vocals
- John McVie – bass guitar
- Mick Fleetwood – drums, percussion

== Chart positions ==
Chart performance for "Isn't It Midnight"
Chart (1988)	Peak position
Belgium (Ultratop 50 Flanders)	35
Ireland (IRMA)	23
Netherlands (Dutch Top 40 Tipparade)	4
Netherlands (Single Top 100)	32
UK Singles (Official Charts)	60
US Mainstream Rock Tracks	14
US AOR Tracks (Radio & Records)	14

=== Year-end charts ===
Year-end chart performance for "Isn't It Midnight"
Chart (1988)	Peak position
US AOR Tracks (Radio & Records)	49
