= Seven Wonders (song) =

1987 single by Fleetwood Mac

Single by Fleetwood Mac

from the album Tango in the Night
- B-side: "Book of Miracles"
- Released: 5 June 1987
- Recorded: 1986
- Genre: Pop rock
- Length: 3:38
- Label: Warner Bros.
- Songwriters: Sandy Stewart; Stevie Nicks
- Producers: Lindsey Buckingham; Richard Dashut

Fleetwood Mac singles chronology
"Big Love" (1987)	"Seven Wonders" (1987)	"Little Lies" (1987)

Music video
- "Seven Wonders" on YouTube

"Seven Wonders" is a song by British-American rock band Fleetwood Mac from their fourteenth studio album, Tango in the Night (1987). Stevie Nicks sang lead vocals on the song, and it was written by Sandy Stewart, with additional lyrics by Nicks.

In the song, the singer remembers a love affair from her past. She sings that even if she should live to see the Seven Wonders of the World, doing so would not compare to the beauty of that romance. The song was released on 5 June 1987, by Warner Bros. Records, as the second single from Tango in the Night. The single became the second of four US Top 20 hits from the album, peaking at number 19 on the US Billboard Hot 100 on 15 August 1987.

The single was also available on the 12-inch single format, which included an extended remix, a dub mix and an instrumental, "Book of Miracles", which later became the track "Juliet" on Nicks' fourth solo studio album The Other Side of the Mirror (1989). A limited edition 12-inch picture disc version was also released in the United Kingdom, where the single reached number 56.

== Background and composition ==
Nicks delivered the demo tape of "Seven Wonders" to Fleetwood Mac at a Halloween party; it was the first song that she submitted to the band for the Tango in the Night album. The song was written by Sandy Stewart, who had already co-written three tracks with Nicks for her 1983 solo album The Wild Heart. Stewart recorded a demo of "Seven Wonders" and sent it to Nicks without a lyric sheet. Nicks misheard one of the lines in the first verse as "all the way down to Emmaline", a contribution that gave her a writing credit alongside Stewart. Nicks later said, "I had become so attached to the name Emmaline that we kept it in and she gave me a small percentage." An earlier version of the song found on the deluxe edition had a longer run-time and placed less emphasis on the song's hook.

== Release and music video ==
The song debuted on the US Billboard Hot 100 at number 52 on the week dated 20 June 1987. That same week, it reached its peak of number two on the Billboard Album Rock chart and was also the second most added song on contemporary hit radio stations reporting to Billboard. The song entered the top 40 on the week dated 4 July 1987 and peaked at number nineteen on the 15th of August. It spent a total of 13 weeks in the top 100, eight of which were in the top 40. In the UK, the single was released on 29 June 1987 and peaked at No. 56 on the singles chart, where it spent four weeks in the top 75.

The accompanying music video for "Seven Wonders", which was directed by Marty Callner, features the band performing without an audience in front of a backdrop with red curtains. On a background diorama, sketches of various landmarks are included including the Taj Mahal, the Roman Colosseum, and the Great Sphinx of Giza.

== Critical reception ==
Cash Box said that "Nicks' distinctive raspy voice buzzes over the song's tranquil lyrics and sterling production." Peter Kane of Sounds said that the song was "probably the nearest we get to a song with the full range of Stevie Nicks' vocal prowess" on Tango in the Night.

Ivy Nelson of Pitchfork felt that the song's hook was a crucial component of the song's arrangement. The Guardian and Paste ranked the song number 20 and number ten respectively on their lists of the 30 greatest Fleetwood Mac songs. Alexis Petridis of The Guardian called Nicks' vocal performance on the song "amazing" and Matt Mitchell of Paste praised the song's "ethereal" keyboards.

== Appearances in other media ==
"The Seven Wonders", the season finale of American Horror Story: Coven, which premiered in 2014, opened with Nicks performing the song. This helped the song to reach number 18 on the Billboard Rock Digital Songs chart with sales of 13,000.

== Track listing and formats ==
US 7-inch vinyl single (Warner Bros. Records 7-28317)

1. "Seven Wonders" – 3:38
2. "Book of Miracles" (Instrumental) – 4:28

UK 12-inch vinyl single (Warner Bros. Records W8317T)

1. "Seven Wonders" (Extended remix) – 6:37
2. "Book of Miracles" (Instrumental) – 4:28
3. "Seven Wonders" (Dub version) – 4:32

== Personnel ==
- Stevie Nicks – lead and backing vocals
- Lindsey Buckingham – guitars, synthesizer, Fairlight CMI, backing vocals
- Christine McVie – synthesizers, backing vocals
- John McVie – bass guitar
- Mick Fleetwood – drums, percussion

== Charts ==
=== Weekly charts ===
Chart (1987)	Peak position
Australia (Kent Music Report)	23
Belgium (Ultratop 50)	27
Canada Top Singles (RPM)	17
Canada Adult Contemporary (RPM)	8
Germany (Media Control)	47
Ireland (Irish Singles Chart)	28
Italy Airplay (Music & Media)	1
Netherlands (Dutch Single Top 100)	28
New Zealand (Official New Zealand Music Chart)	49
Spain (Promusicae)	44
UK Singles (Official Charts Company)	56
US Billboard Hot 100	19
US Adult Contemporary (Billboard)	13
US Mainstream Rock (Billboard)	2
US Cash Box Top 100	24
US Adult Contemporary (Radio & Records)	8
US AOR Tracks (Radio & Records)	4
US Contemporary Hit Radio (Radio & Records)	17

Chart (2014)	Position
US Rock Digital Songs (Billboard)	18

=== Year-end charts ===
Chart (1987)	Position
US Mainstream Rock (Billboard)	18
US Adult Contemporary (Radio & Records)	67
US AOR Tracks (Radio & Records)	6

== Certifications ==
Region	Certification	Certified units/sales
United Kingdom (BPI)	Platinum	600,000^{‡}
^{‡} Sales+streaming figures based on certification alone.
