= Little Lies =

1987 single by Fleetwood Mac

Single by Fleetwood Mac

from the album Tango in the Night
- B-side: "Ricky"
- Released: 14 August 1987
- Genre: Pop rock; soft rock; ambient
- Length: 3:39
- Label: Warner Bros.
- Songwriters: Christine McVie; Eddy Quintela
- Producers: Lindsey Buckingham; Richard Dashut

Fleetwood Mac singles chronology
"Seven Wonders" (1987)	"Little Lies" (1987)	"Everywhere" (1987)

Music video
- "Little Lies" on YouTube

"Little Lies" is a song by British-American rock band Fleetwood Mac from their fourteenth studio album, Tango in the Night (1987). It was written by band member Christine McVie and her then-husband, Eddy Quintela, with lead vocals performed primarily by McVie; the chorus features backing vocals by Lindsey Buckingham and Stevie Nicks. The song was released by Warner Bros. Records as the third single from Tango in the Night on 14 August 1987. It became the first single by the group to peak within the top five in both the United States and United Kingdom. In the United States, it was their final top ten hit on the Billboard Hot 100.

== Background ==
McVie recalled that she created the counter-vocals over an existing Buckingham composition and wrote the rest of the song at her pool with a pad and paper. Eddy Quintela, who at the time was married to McVie, was listed as one of the songwriters on "Little Lies". McVie stated in an interview with MOJO that Quintela's role in the creation of "Little Lies" was minimal and that the lyrical content did not relate to him. She discussed the meaning of the lyrics in an interview with Timothy White.

The idea of the lyric is: If I had the chance, I'd do it differently next time. But since I can't, just carry on lying to me and I'll believe, even though I know you're lying.

Similar to the rest of the songs on Tango in the Night, "Little Lies" had its final stereo mix mastered on a Sony two-track digital machine for the purpose of preserving the sound of the original tracks. During the mastering process, some glitches in the audio emerged when the song's digital audio tapes were manually spliced. Greg Droman, who served as an audio engineer for the Tango in the Night sessions, believed that some glitches on "Little Lies" were left unresolved on the released version. "There's something on one song — I think it's 'Little Lies'. You could easily say 'Oh that's a hi-hat.' But it's not. I know it's not."

== Release and commercial performance ==
"Little Lies" received 82 adds to playlists from radio stations reporting to Billboard for the week dated 29 August 1987, making it the second most added song that week. The single stayed at number one for four weeks on the US Billboard Adult Contemporary chart and number four on the Billboard Hot 100 in November 1987. It was the third of four US Top 20 hits (and highest charting) from Tango in the Night. It was the band's last top-ten hit in the US. "Little Lies" was also the band's first song to reach the top five in both the United States and the United Kingdom.

In the UK, "Little Lies" was released in early September. The single reached number five on the UK Singles Chart, where it has since achieved 3× Platinum status. "Little Lies" continues to be played on radio stations as a classic hit of the late 1980s, along with "Everywhere" and "Seven Wonders", both of which are from Tango in the Night. "Little Lies" was also accompanied by a music video, filmed on a farm, in and around its rustic buildings and fields.

The single was also available on the 12" single format, featuring an extended dance version created by John Benitez, also known as Jellybean. In the UK, the 12-inch single peaked at No. 13 on the Twelve-Inch Single chart and No. 32 on the Top Dance Singles chart published by Music Week.

The B-sides included a dub version of "Little Lies" and the song "Ricky", a non-album track penned by McVie and Buckingham. A limited 12" picture disc was also released in the United Kingdom, and it was the first Fleetwood Mac single to be issued on the cassette single format.

== Critical reception ==
Cash Box said that "McVie's songwriting ability combined with Lindsey Buckingham's production assistance provide a extremely likeable hit-to-be." Andrew Male of MOJO called "Little Lies" one of the two biggest highlights on Tango in the Night along with "Everywhere". Mike Mettler of Sound & Vision thought that the song gave "all three lead vocalists their due." The Guardian and Paste ranked "Little Lies" number 21 and number 29 respectively on their lists of the 30 greatest Fleetwood Mac songs.

== Track listing and formats ==
- US 12-inch vinyl single (Warner Bros. Records 0-20761)
1. "Little Lies" (Extended version) – 6:07
2. "Little Lies" (Dub version) – 4:04
3. "Ricky" – 4:21
- UK 7-inch vinyl single (Warner Bros. Records W 8291)
1. "Little Lies" – 3:38
2. "Ricky" – 4:21

== Personnel ==
- Christine McVie – lead and backing vocals, keyboards
- Lindsey Buckingham – guitars, keyboards, Fairlight CMI, backing vocals
- Stevie Nicks – backing vocals
- John McVie – bass
- Mick Fleetwood – drums, percussion

== Charts ==
=== Weekly charts ===
Weekly chart performance for "Little Lies"
Chart (1987)	Peak position
Australia (Kent Music Report)	16
Austria (Ö3 Austria Top 40)	21
Belgium (Ultratop 50)	14
Canada Top Singles (RPM)	13
Canada Adult Contemporary (RPM)	2
Europe (European Hot 100 Singles)	8
Finland (Suomen virallinen lista)	3
Ireland (IRMA)	4
Netherlands (Dutch Top 40)	10
Netherlands (Single Top 100)	10
New Zealand (RIANZ)	9
South Africa (Springbok Radio)	22
Switzerland (Hitparade)	3
UK Singles (OCC)	5
US Billboard Hot 100	4
US Adult Contemporary (Billboard)	1
US Mainstream Rock Airplay (Billboard)	14
US Cash Box Top 100	9
US Adult Contemporary (Radio & Records)	1
US AOR Tracks (Radio & Records)	15
US Contemporary Hit Radio (Radio & Records)	4
West Germany (Media Control)	3

Chart (2018)	Peak position
Poland Airplay (ZPAV)	96

Chart (2025–2026)	Peak position
Poland Airplay (OLiS)	68
Sweden Heatseeker (Sverigetopplistan)	13

=== Year-end charts ===
1987 year-end chart performance for "Little Lies"
Chart (1987)	Rank
Australia (Kent Music Report)	85
Canada Top Singles (RPM)	89
Europe (European Top 100 Singles)	94
Netherlands (Dutch Top 40)	76
Netherlands (Single Top 100)	70
UK Singles (OCC)	55
US Billboard Hot 100	51
US Adult Contemporary (Billboard)	28
US Adult Contemporary (Radio & Records)	18
US Contemporary Hit Radio (Radio & Records)	32

== Certifications and sales ==
Certifications and sales for "Little Lies"
Region	Certification	Certified units/sales
Denmark (IFPI Danmark)	Platinum	90,000^{‡}
New Zealand (RMNZ)	5× Platinum	150,000^{‡}
United Kingdom (BPI)	3× Platinum	1,800,000^{‡}
^{‡} Sales+streaming figures based on certification alone.

== Hilary Duff version ==
"Little Lies"

Promotional single by Hilary Duff
- Released: January 13, 2016
- Recorded: 2015
- Genre: Dance; dubstep; synth-pop
- Length: 3:23
- Label: RCA; Sony
- Songwriters: Christine McVie; Eddy Quintela
- Producers: Peer Åström; Adam Anders

Music video
- "Little Lies" (Younger Promo) on YouTube

Hilary Duff recorded a cover of the song, produced by Peer Åström and Adam Anders, in promotion of the second season of her TV Land comedy series, Younger. It was released January 13, 2016, through RCA Records and Sony Music Entertainment.

=== Background and recording ===
"TV Land called me," Duff told People, "They were like, 'We want you to cover a song for the promos for the second season.' And I’m like, 'Oh my God. Yes, of course, I would love to.'" A preview of her rendition of the song was made available through the magazine in December 2015. The recording was produced by Peer Åström and Adam Anders, with vocal engineering and production from Alex Anders, the same team responsible for the music behind the popular Fox musical comedy-drama, Glee.

Duff's recording has been described as synthpop, with additional influences of dance genres, especially dubstep.

=== Critical reception ===
Duff's genre-altering recording of "Little Lies" has received mixed reviews from critics. "This cover doesn’t work for me," writes Mike Wass of Idolator, "The plodding electronic production ... completely overwhelms Fleetwood Mac’s delicate Tango In The Night smash and makes the "Sparks" diva sound like Siri's older sister." However, Lucas Villa of AXS TV was more complimentary, writing that Duff "rises above the synths to emerge as the dance floor queen she's been since the release of her 2007 album, Dignity."

=== Release history ===
Country	Date	Format	Label
Worldwide	January 13, 2016	Digital download	RCA; Sony
Russia	February 19, 2016	Digital download	Sony
