= Richard Dashut =

American producer and songwriter

- Also known as: Richard "Dick Dash" Dashut
- Born: Richard Charles Dashut; September 19, 1951 (age 75)
- Genres: Rock, pop
- Occupations: Record producer, sound engineer, live sound mixing
- Years active: 1972–present
- Website: thepenguinstale.tumblr.com

Richard Charles Dashut (born September 19, 1951) is an American record producer who produced several Fleetwood Mac albums including Rumours, Tusk, Live, Mirage, Tango in the Night, and Time.

Dashut was born in West Hollywood, California, and started his career sweeping floors in a recording studio where he later met Lindsey Buckingham and Stevie Nicks. Keith Olsen hired Dashut as a maintenance worker at Sound City and later employed him as second engineer on a few albums including Buckingham Nicks, which in turn led to Dashut's work with Fleetwood Mac. Dashut also co-wrote several songs with Lindsey Buckingham and also co-produced his Law and Order and Out of the Cradle solo albums.

== Discography ==
- As You Will (1973) – Lambert and Nuttycombe – (assistant engineer)
- Buckingham Nicks (1973) – Buckingham Nicks – (second engineer)
- Rumours (1977) – Fleetwood Mac – (producer, engineer)
- French Kiss (1977) – Bob Welch – (engineer)
- Not Shy (1978) – Walter Egan – (producer, engineer)
- Tusk (1979) – Fleetwood Mac – (producer, engineer)
- Uprooted (1979) – Rob Grill – (recording)
- Three Hearts (1979) – Bob Welch – (Co-producer "Ghost of Flight 401")
- Live (1980) – Fleetwood Mac – (producer, live mixing)
- Law and Order (1981) – Lindsey Buckingham – (producer, recording)
- The Visitor (1981) – Mick Fleetwood – (producer, performer, photography)
- Tongue Twister (1981) – Shoes – (producer)
- Mirage (1982) – Fleetwood Mac – (producer, co-writer, engineer)
- I'm Not Me (1983) – Mick Fleetwood – (producer, co-writer)
- National Lampoon's Vacation (1983) – Lindsey Buckingham – (producer)
- Back to the Future (1985) – Lindsey Buckingham – (producer)
- A Fine Mess (1986) – Christine McVie – (producer)
- Remembrance Days (1987) – The Dream Academy – (producer)
- Tango in the Night (1987) – Fleetwood Mac – (producer, co-writer, engineer)
- Greatest Hits (1988) – Fleetwood Mac – (producer, engineer)
- The Very Best of Bob Welch (1991) – Bob Welch – (producer, engineer)
- 25 Years – The Chain (1992) – Fleetwood Mac – (producer, engineer, co-writer)
- Out of the Cradle (1992) – Lindsey Buckingham – (producer, co-writer)
- Altered Beast (1993) – Matthew Sweet – (producer)
- Time (1995) – Fleetwood Mac – (producer)
- The Very Best of Fleetwood Mac (2002) – Fleetwood Mac – (producer, co-writer, engineer)

=== With Buckingham Nicks ===
Year	Album	US	UK	Additional information
1973	Buckingham Nicks	-	-	Debut album featuring duo of Buckingham and partner Stevie Nicks. Both would later join Fleetwood Mac, after this album failed commercially and label Polydor dropped them as they were recording tracks for follow-up LP

=== With Fleetwood Mac ===
==== Albums ====
Year	Album	US	UK	AUS	CAN	GER	SWI	AUT	SWE	FRA	RIAA certification
1977	Rumours	1	1	1	1	6		25	19	27	19× Platinum
1979	Tusk	4	1	2	2	3		4	8	6	2× Platinum
1982	Mirage	1	5	2	4	12			10	5	2× Platinum
1987	Tango in the Night	7	1	5	2	2	7	25	1	25	3× Platinum
1995	Time	-	47	-	-	92	-	-	-	-	

==== Live albums and compilations ====
Year	Album	US	UK	AUS	CAN	GER	SWI	AUT	SWE	FRA	RIAA certifications
1980	Live	14	31	20		51			50		Gold
1988	Greatest Hits	14	3	3			18		15		8× Platinum
2002	The Very Best of Fleetwood Mac	12	6	16					18		Platinum

==== DVD and video releases ====
- Classic Albums: Rumours (1997)
- Tusk tour documentary (1982)
- Mirage Tour (1982)

=== With Lindsey Buckingham ===
Year	Album	US	UK	SWE	CAN
1981	Law and Order	32	-	-	-
1992	Out of the Cradle	128	51	28	70

=== With Mick Fleetwood ===
Year	Album	US	Additional information
1981	The Visitor	43	Featured two Fleetwood Mac remakes – "Rattlesnake Shake" & "Walk A Thin Line"
1983	I'm Not Me	–	Billed as "Mick Fleetwood's Zoo"

=== Soundtrack appearances ===
Year	Song	Soundtrack	Additional information
1983	"Holiday Road", "Dancing Across the USA"	National Lampoon's Vacation	-
1985	"Time Bomb Town"	Back to the Future	-
1985	"Trouble"	Just One of the Guys	-

== Tours ==
- Fleetwood Mac tour –
- Rumours tour – 1977–78
- Tusk tour – 1979–80
- Mirage tour – 1982
