= Tusk (Camper Van Beethoven album) =

Studio album by Camper Van Beethoven
- Released: January 1, 2003
- Genre: Alternative rock
- Length: 81:10
- Label: Pitch A Tent

Camper Van Beethoven chronology
Key Lime Pie (1989)	Tusk (2003)	New Roman Times (2004)

Professional ratings
Review scores
Source	Rating
AllMusic	2.5/5 stars

Tusk is a 2003 studio album by American alternative rock group Camper Van Beethoven, a song-for-song remake of the 1979 Fleetwood Mac album of the same name.

Tusk is the first album the band released following its reunion, and the band initially claimed that it was recorded before their break up. However, it was recorded in the period leading up to their reunion tour.

== Background ==
In an interview with the Chicago Tribune, bass player Victor Krummenacher admitted that some of the band members hate the 1979 album, saying that it was "like the Magnificent Ambersons of rock, a work that's supposed to be good, but is really just a cocaine-damaged horror of excess. Which is why we took it on, I suppose, and I think we improved upon it."

Lindsey Buckingham, a member of Fleetwood Mac who performed and wrote much of the material on Tusk, said that he "loved" Camper Van Beethoven's rendition of the album.

They took some of the songs to such different places. I thought, "Wow, where did they come up with that?" Just the fact that a group of guys would sit around and want to remake a whole album like that. That was just a trip, I have to say. I loved it.

— Lindsey Buckingham

== Track listing ==
Disc 1

1. "Over & Over" (Christine McVie) – 4:48
2. "The Ledge" (Lindsey Buckingham) – 2:06
3. "Think About Me" (Christine McVie) – 2:48
4. "Save Me a Place" (Lindsey Buckingham) – 3:23
5. "Sara" (Stevie Nicks) – 4:56
6. "What Makes You Think You're the One" (Lindsey Buckingham) – 3:30
7. "Storms" (Stevie Nicks) – 6:01
8. "That's All for Everyone" (Lindsey Buckingham) – 3:13
9. "Not That Funny" (Lindsey Buckingham) – 1:55
10. "Sisters of the Moon" (Stevie Nicks) – 4:00

Disc 2

1. "Angel" (Stevie Nicks) – 5:27
2. "That's Enough for Me" (Lindsey Buckingham) – 1:55
3. "Brown Eyes" (Christine McVie) – 3:39
4. "Never Make Me Cry" (Christine McVie) – 2:16
5. "I Know I'm Not Wrong" (Lindsey Buckingham) – 3:13
6. "Honey Hi" (Christine McVie) – 2:39
7. "Beautiful Child" (Stevie Nicks) – 5:35
8. "Walk a Thin Line" (Lindsey Buckingham) – 4:00
9. "Tusk" (Lindsey Buckingham) – 10:15
10. "Never Forget" (Christine McVie) – 3:41
