= Live (Fleetwood Mac album) =

Live album by Fleetwood Mac
- Released: 5 December 1980
- Recorded: 17 October 1975 – 4 September 1980
- Genres: Rock; hard rock
- Length: 91:06
- Label: Warner Bros.
- Producers: Richard Dashut; Ken Caillat; Fleetwood Mac

Fleetwood Mac chronology
Tusk (1979)	Live (1980)	Mirage (1982)

Singles from Live
- 1. "Fireflies" Released: January 1981 (US); 2. "The Farmer's Daughter" Released: January 1981 (UK)

Professional ratings
Review scores
Source	Rating
AllMusic	3.5/5 stars
Robert Christgau	C+
Rolling Stone	3/5 stars
Record Mirror	3/5 stars

Live is a double live album released by British-American rock band Fleetwood Mac on 5 December 1980. It was the first live album from the then-current line-up of the band, and the next would be The Dance from 1997. The album was certified gold (500,000 copies sold) by the RIAA in November 1981. A deluxe edition of the album was released on 9 April 2021.

Live consists of recordings taken primarily from the 1979–1980 Tusk Tour and a Buckingham Nicks track, "Don't Let Me Down Again", from the 1975 Fleetwood Mac Tour. The deluxe edition also includes a few recordings from the earlier Rumours Tour of 1977 and the later Mirage Tour of 1982. According to the liner notes, two songs were recorded at a Paris soundcheck and three at a performance at Santa Monica Civic Auditorium "for an audience of friends and road crew".

== Background ==
Drummer Mick Fleetwood had originally suggested that the band release a live album at the time of the Rumours Tour, although the band decided against it, with recording engineer Richard Dashut arguing that it would interfere with the band's in-studio identity. The band still recorded over 400 shows from 1975-79 in case they changed their minds. At the conclusion of the Tusk Tour, Fleetwood proposed the idea again, and this time the band agreed despite Buckingham's and John McVie's initial reservations.

The album was digitally recorded using technology developed by Soundstream. Ken Caillat mentioned in a 1981 interview that the band spent $20,000 to digitally mix the album and that it cost around $500 per day to use the digital equipment. Billboard said that Mobile Fidelity Sound Lab half-speed mastered the album for the audiophile market.

Of particular note are three new songs—Christine McVie's "One More Night", Stevie Nicks's "Fireflies", and a backstage rendition of the Beach Boys' "The Farmer's Daughter". The latter two were released as singles; "Fireflies" reached the top 60 in the US, while "The Farmer's Daughter" reached the top 10 in Austria.

The band covered "Farmer's Daughter" at the request of Buckingham, who deemed the Brian Wilson tune "obscure" and "contemporary" enough to include on the album. A recording of "The Farmer's Daughter" also appears on the Tusk re-release of 2004. "Don't Let Me Down Again" is a song from the Buckingham Nicks album and was recorded during a 1975 performance in Passaic.

== Release ==
Music Week reported that Live would be released in the United Kingdom on 3 December 1980. They announced that its promotional campaign would include radio-ads with WHSmith and Our Price, along with press advertisements, flyposting, and point of sale material. The album was ultimately released by WEA in the United Kingdom on 5 December 1980, whereas it received a 13 December 1980 release in the United States. UK editions of the album included a sticker with the words "pay no more than £6.00" and the US pressings carried a retail price of $13.98.

== Critical reception ==
Music Week predicted that the album "must be a winner" and "should make it big" with its track listing. Cashbox called it "one of the most music live pac ages to be put out this year". They expressed their opinion that Buckingham and Fleetwood were most responsible for keeping the set "glued together with their conviction and musical ability." Billboard said that Live "spans some of the best of the group's material, all delivered in crisp fashion." They praised the album's sound quality and "exceptional" packaging and expressed their belief that the "spontaneous interaction among members" resulted in renditions that were unique from their studio recordings.

== Track listing ==
Side one
No.	Title	Writer(s)	Location	Length
1.	"Monday Morning"	Lindsey Buckingham	2/3/80, Budokan Hall, Tokyo	3:51
2.	"Say You Love Me"	Christine McVie	8/25/80, Kansas Coliseum, Wichita	4:18
3.	"Dreams"	Stevie Nicks	6/14/80, Palais de Sport, Paris (soundcheck)	4:18
4.	"Oh Well"	Peter Green	11/5/79, Checker Dome, St. Louis	3:23
5.	"Over & Over"	Christine McVie	8/22/80, Myriad Convention Center, Oklahoma City	5:01
Total length:				21:20

Side two
No.	Title	Writer(s)	Location	Length
1.	"Sara"	Stevie Nicks	11/5/79, Checker Dome, St. Louis	7:23
2.	"Not That Funny"	Lindsey Buckingham	5/21/80, Richfield Coliseum, Cleveland	9:04
3.	"Never Going Back Again"	Lindsey Buckingham	8/28/80, McKale Center, Tucson	4:13
4.	"Landslide"	Stevie Nicks	6/25/80, Wembley Arena, London	4:33
Total length:				25:14

Side three
No.	Title	Writer(s)	Location	Length
1.	"Fireflies"	Stevie Nicks	9/4/80, Santa Monica Civic Auditorium, Santa Monica (for crew and friends)	4:37
2.	"Over My Head"	Christine McVie	8/24/80, Kemper Arena, Kansas City	3:27
3.	"Rhiannon"	Stevie Nicks	6/26/80, Wembley Arena, London	7:43
4.	"Don't Let Me Down Again" (from Buckingham Nicks, 1973)	Lindsey Buckingham	10/17/75, Capitol Theater, Passaic	3:57
5.	"One More Night"	Christine McVie	9/3/80, Santa Monica Civic Auditorium, Santa Monica (for crew and friends)	3:43
Total length:				23:33

Side four
No.	Title	Writer(s)	Location	Length
1.	"Go Your Own Way"	Lindsey Buckingham	5/21/80, Richfield Coliseum, Cleveland	5:44
2.	"Don't Stop"	Christine McVie	6/14/80, Palais de Sport, Paris (soundcheck)	4:05
3.	"I'm So Afraid"	Lindsey Buckingham	5/20/80, Richfield Coliseum, Cleveland	8:28
4.	"Farmer's Daughter"	Brian Wilson; Mike Love	9/4/80, Santa Monica Civic Auditorium, Santa Monica (for crew and friends)	2:25
Total length:				20:47

2021 super deluxe edition
No.	Title	Writer(s)	Location	Length
1.	"Second Hand News"	Lindsey Buckingham	10/21/82, The Forum, Inglewood	3:52
2.	"The Chain"	Buckingham; Fleetwood; C. McVie; J. McVie; Nicks	5/20/80, Richfield Coliseum, Cleveland	6:50
3.	"Think About Me"	Christine McVie	8/24/80, Kemper Arena, Kansas City	3:09
4.	"What Makes You Think You're the One"	Lindsey Buckingham	8/23/80, Kemper Arena, Kansas City	4:20
5.	"Gold Dust Woman"	Stevie Nicks	8/29/77, The Forum, Inglewood	7:23
6.	"Brown Eyes"	Christine McVie	10/22/82, The Forum, Inglewood	4:27
7.	"The Green Manalishi (With the Two-Pronged Crown)"	Peter Green	5/18/77, State Fair Arena, Oklahoma City	5:27
8.	"Angel"	Stevie Nicks	5/20/80, Richfield Coliseum, Cleveland	4:49
9.	"Hold Me"	Christine McVie	10/21/82, The Forum, Inglewood	4:19
10.	"Tusk"	Lindsey Buckingham	8/24/80, Kemper Arena, Kansas City	6:25
11.	"You Make Loving Fun"	Christine McVie	5/19/77, BOK Center, Tulsa	4:44
12.	"Sisters of the Moon"	Stevie Nicks	8/21/80, Omaha Civic Auditorium, Omaha	7:17
13.	"Songbird"	Christine McVie	8/21/80, Omaha Civic Auditorium, Omaha	4:14
14.	"Blue Letter"	Michael Curtis; Richard Curtis	5/20/77, Barton Coliseum, Little Rock	4:48
15.	"Fireflies"	Stevie Nicks	remix – long version	4:04
16.	"Fireflies"	Stevie Nicks	demo	3:41
17.	"One More Night"	Christine McVie	demo	3:00
Total length:				82:58

== Personnel ==
Fleetwood Mac

- Lindsey Buckingham – guitar, vocals
- Stevie Nicks – vocals, percussion
- Christine McVie – keyboards, vocals
- John McVie – bass
- Mick Fleetwood – drums, percussion

Additional personnel

- Ray Lindsey – additional guitar on "Go Your Own Way"
- Tony Toadaro – additional percussion
- Jeffery Sova – additional keyboards

Production

- Richard Dashut – producer, mix-down engineer, live engineering
- Ken Caillat – producer, live recording, mix-down engineer
- Fleetwood Mac – producers
- Biff Dawes – live recording
- Trip Khalaf – live engineering
- Carla Frederick – studio recording assistant
- Rich Feldman – studio recording assistant
- David (Dominguez) Ahlert – studio recording assistant
- Ken Perry – mastering
- Larry Vigon – art direction and design
- Chris Callis – cover and collage photography
- Sam Emerson – collage photography
- Sharon Weisz – collage photography

== Charts ==
=== Album ===
1980 chart performance for Live
Chart (1980)	Peak position
Dutch Albums (Album Top 100)	13
Swedish Albums (Sverigetopplistan)	50
UK Albums (Official Charts)	31
US Billboard 200	14

1981 chart performance for Live
Chart (1981)	Peak position
New Zealand Albums (RMNZ)	37

2021 chart performance for Live
Chart (2021)	Peak position
Belgian Albums (Ultratop Flanders)	194
Belgian Albums (Ultratop Wallonia)	61
Hungarian Albums (MAHASZ)	28
German Albums (Offizielle Top 100)	23
Swiss Albums (Schweizer Hitparade)	61

== Certifications ==
Certifications for Live
Region	Certification	Certified units/sales
United Kingdom (BPI)	Gold	100,000^{^}
United States (RIAA)	Gold	500,000^{^}
^{^} Shipments figures based on certification alone.
