= Just Tell Me That You Want Me: A Tribute to Fleetwood Mac =

Compilation album by Various artists
- Released: August 14, 2012
- Recorded: 2012
- Genre: Indie rock
- Length: 87:01
- Label: Hear Music
- Producers: Randall Poster; Gelya Robb

Just Tell Me That You Want Me: A Tribute to Fleetwood Mac is a tribute album produced by Randall Poster and Gelya Robb, featuring various indie rock artists covering Fleetwood Mac songs. It was released on August 14, 2012. The title refers to a lyric from the song "Tusk".

== Critical reception ==
Professional ratings
Review scores
Source	Rating
AllMusic	3.5/5 stars
Rolling Stone	3.5/5 stars

Rolling Stone compared the album favorably to Poster and Robb's 2011 tribute album, Rave On Buddy Holly. NPR's Stephen Thompson also compared this album and the producers' prior Buddy Holly tribute, saying they both "possess both a sense of cohesion and a reasonably high hit rate", giving highest praise to The New Pornographers' "perfect power-pop throwback" cover of "Think About Me", and noting that first part of the album was more pop in spirit than the "hazier, more dance-driven musings in the second".

== Track listing ==
No.	Title	Writer(s)	Performer	Length
1.	"Albatross"	Peter Green	Lee Ranaldo Band and J Mascis	4:15
2.	"Landslide"	Stevie Nicks	Antony	3:33
3.	"Before the Beginning"	Green	Trixie Whitley	4:46
4.	"Oh Well"	Green	Billy Gibbons & Co.	4:45
5.	"Rhiannon"	Nicks	Best Coast	3:07
6.	"Think About Me"	Christine McVie	The New Pornographers	2:56
7.	"Angel"	Nicks	Marianne Faithfull	2:55
8.	"Silver Springs"	Nicks	Lykke Li	4:10
9.	"Gold Dust Woman"	Nicks	Karen Elson	5:42
10.	"Storms"	Nicks	Matt Sweeney and Bonnie 'Prince' Billy	5:42
11.	"Straight Back"	Nicks	Washed Out	3:43
12.	"That's All for Everyone"	Lindsey Buckingham	Tame Impala	3:43
13.	"Sisters of the Moon"	Nicks	Craig Wedren and St. Vincent	3:45
14.	"Dreams"	Nicks	The Kills	4:56
15.	"Gypsy"	Nicks	Gardens & Villa	4:40
16.	"Tusk"	Buckingham	The Crystal Ark	5:30
17.	"Future Games"	Bob Welch	MGMT	9:01
18.	"Hold Me"	McVie; Robbie Patton	Haim	3:40
19.	"The Green Manalishi"	Green	The Entrance Band	6:12
Total length:				87:01

== Charts ==
Chart (2012)	Peak position
US Billboard 200	45
US Top Rock Albums	15
