= Unleashed (concert tour) =

2009 concert tour by Fleetwood Mac

- Tour by Fleetwood Mac
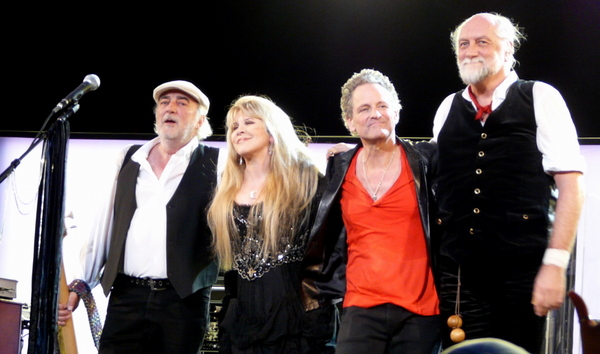
- Fleetwood Mac live on 3 March 2009, in Saint Paul, Minnesota (left to right) John McVie, Stevie Nicks, Lindsey Buckingham, Mick Fleetwood
- Start date: March 1, 2009
- End date: December 20, 2009
- Legs: 3
- No. of shows: 81

Fleetwood Mac concert chronology
- Say You Will Tour (2003–04); Unleashed (2009); Fleetwood Mac Live (2013)

The Unleashed Tour was a concert tour by the rock band Fleetwood Mac. The tour ran from March 1, to December 20, 2009 in the United States, Canada, Germany, Ireland, the United Kingdom, Australia and New Zealand and was the band's first tour in five years, the group featured tracks within the setlist that spanned "all the Mac's many greatest hits" and pulled two rarely played live tracks "Storms" and "I Know I'm Not Wrong" that were taken from the Tusk album. They also resurrected the Peter Green track 'Oh Well' for the first time live since 1995. The tour ranked number 13 in the Worldwide Concert Tours data that is maintained by Pollstar and grossed a total of $84.9 million with a total attendance of 832,597.

== Background ==
This was the first tour that the Rumours-era lineup undertook without a new album to promote. The group were planning to rerelease Rumours as a CD/DVD combo with unreleased songs, demos and footage from that era. However, this was delayed until 2013's deluxe and super-deluxe editions.

Christine McVie did not participate, having retired from the group in 1998. Stevie Nicks mooted Sheryl Crow joining the band to add a female to the group dynamic in McVie's absence.

Of the onstage atmosphere, Nicks remarked: "My cousin John has known Lindsey [Buckingham] and I since 1968. He told me, 'When I saw you and Lindsey play with Fleetwood Mac in 2009, there was nothing between you. It was as if you were thinking, What shall I get from room service tonight? Grilled cheese? Tomato soup?' Hammy wasn't the word for Lindsey and I in 2009 – it was totally fake."

== Set list ==
1. "Monday Morning"
2. "The Chain"
3. "Dreams"
4. "I Know I'm Not Wrong"
5. "Gypsy"
6. "Go Insane"
7. "Rhiannon"
8. "Second Hand News"
9. "Tusk"
10. "Sara"
11. "Big Love"
12. "Landslide"
13. "Never Going Back Again"
14. "Storms"
15. "Say You Love Me"
16. "Gold Dust Woman"
17. "Oh Well"
18. "I'm So Afraid"
19. "Stand Back"
20. "Go Your Own Way"
  First encore
21. "World Turning"
22. "Drum solo"
23. "Don't Stop"
  Second encore
24. "Silver Springs"

== Tour dates ==
Date	City	Country	Venue	Tickets sold / available	Revenue
North America
March 1, 2009	Pittsburgh	United States	Mellon Arena	11,854 / 13,075	$1,148,633
March 3, 2009	Saint Paul	United States	Xcel Energy Center	12,046 / 18,341	$1,241,491
March 5, 2009	Rosemont, Illinois (Chicago)	United States	Allstate Arena	24,796 / 28,044	$2,382,027
March 6, 2009	Rosemont, Illinois (Chicago)	United States	Allstate Arena	24,796 / 28,044	$2,382,027
March 8, 2009	Auburn Hills	United States	The Palace of Auburn Hills	11,338 / 12,515	$808,994
March 10, 2009	Washington, D.C.	United States	Verizon Center	14,468 / 14,468	$1,605,006
March 11, 2009	Boston	United States	TD Banknorth Garden	13,005 / 17,388	$1,292,161
March 13, 2009	Uniondale	United States	Nassau Coliseum	11,210 / 11,210	$1,027,022
March 14, 2009	Uncasville	United States	Mohegan Sun Arena	8,155 / 8,183	$904,625
March 16, 2009	Rochester	United States	Blue Cross Arena	8,183 / 10,891	$717,450
March 19, 2009	New York City	United States	Madison Square Garden	14,955 / 15,258	$1,708,005
March 21, 2009	East Rutherford	United States	Izod Center	13,306 / 15,003	$1,277,892
March 23, 2009	Ottawa	Canada	Scotiabank Place	12,122 / 14,285	$1,091,999
March 25, 2009	Montreal	Canada	Bell Centre	9,042 / 11,300	$841,407
March 26, 2009	Toronto	Canada	Air Canada Centre		
April 15, 2009	Philadelphia	United States	Wachovia Center	12,355 / 14,617	$1,156,685
April 17, 2009	Cleveland	United States	Quicken Loans Arena	9,351 / 13,507	$797,926
April 18, 2009	Columbus	United States	Nationwide Arena	11,820 / 16,167	$1,088,276
April 20, 2009	Orlando	United States	Amway Arena	7,668 / 10,688	$756,311
April 22, 2009	Tampa	United States	St. Pete Times Forum	7,542 / 23,722	$713,643
April 23, 2009	Fort Lauderdale	United States	BankAtlantic Center	9,509 / 11,839	$980,852
April 25, 2009	Charlotte	United States	Time Warner Cable Arena	11,937 / 13,866	$984,558
April 26, 2009	Greensboro	United States	Greensboro Coliseum		
April 28, 2009	Atlanta	United States	Philips Arena	10,653 / 11,910	$959,973
April 30, 2009	Dallas	United States	American Airlines Center	13,708 / 14,148	$1,453,232
May 2, 2009	Houston	United States	Toyota Center	12,762 / 13,306	$1,343,855
May 3, 2009	Tulsa	United States	BOK Center	12,976 / 12,976	$1,286,633
May 5, 2009	St. Louis	United States	Scottrade Center	12,016 / 19,080	$736,300
May 7, 2009	Omaha	United States	Qwest Center	10,096 / 14,253	$843,569
May 8, 2009	Kansas City	United States	Sprint Center	13,066 / 14,187	$1,384,110
May 10, 2009	Denver	United States	Pepsi Center	12,228 / 12,656	$1,155,831
May 15, 2009	Vancouver	Canada	General Motors Place	13,934 / 13,934	$1,855,616
May 16, 2009	Tacoma	United States	Tacoma Dome	14,735 / 14,807	$1,390,755
May 20, 2009	Oakland	United States	Oracle Arena	10,979 / 18,000	$889,320
May 21, 2009	San Jose	United States	HP Pavilion	11,078 / 12,964	$1,094,667
May 23, 2009	Anaheim	United States	Honda Center	12,733 / 13,212	$1,275,744
May 24, 2009	Glendale	United States	Jobing.com Arena	12,006 / 13,175	$1,026,737
May 28, 2009	Los Angeles	United States	Staples Center	13,542 / 14,369	$1,475,463
May 30, 2009	Las Vegas	United States	MGM Grand Garden Arena	11,193 / 12,186	$1,192,385
May 31, 2009	San Diego	United States	Sports Arena	9,971 / 9,971	$839,074
June 3, 2009	Salt Lake City	United States	EnergySolutions Arena		
June 5, 2009	Saskatoon	Canada	SaskTel Centre		
June 6, 2009	Winnipeg	Canada	MTS Centre		
June 8, 2009	Milwaukee	United States	Bradley Center		
June 10, 2009	Baltimore	United States	1st Mariner Arena		
June 11, 2009	New York City	United States	Madison Square Garden		
June 13, 2009	Atlantic City	United States	Boardwalk Hall	9,458 / 11,670	$813,585
June 16, 2009	Manchester	United States	Verizon Wireless Arena		
June 17, 2009	Uncasville	United States	Mohegan Sun Arena		
June 19, 2009	Nashville	United States	Sommet Center	8,895 / 13,472	$688,725
June 20, 2009	New Orleans	United States	New Orleans Arena	11,470 / 12,724	$970,809
June 23, 2009	Calgary	Canada	Pengrowth Saddledome		
June 24, 2009	Edmonton	Canada	Rexall Place	11,607 / 12,962	$1,451,546
Europe
October 8, 2009	Copenhagen	Denmark	Parken	16,655 / 20,415	$1,894,705
October 10, 2009	Stockholm	Sweden	Ericsson Globe	10,515 / 11,352	$962,886
October 12, 2009	Oberhausen	Germany	Arena		
October 14, 2009	Antwerp	Belgium	Sportpaleis	12,589 / 12,687	$1,104,080
October 15, 2009	Rotterdam	Netherlands	Ahoy	10,811 / 10,811	$923,385
October 17, 2009	Paris	France	Le Zénith	6,053 / 6,053	$472,628
October 19, 2009	Berlin	Germany	O2 World	10,988 / 11,931	$877,545
October 22, 2009	Glasgow	Scotland	SECC	8,778 / 8,778	$1,013,963
October 24, 2009	Dublin	Ireland	The O2	16,026 / 16,026	$2,682,390
October 25, 2009	Dublin	Ireland	The O2	16,026 / 16,026	$2,682,390
October 27, 2009	Manchester	England	Manchester Evening News Arena	14,442 / 15,187	$1,649,086
October 30, 2009	London	England	Wembley Arena	22,209 / 22,368	$2,557,957
October 31, 2009	London	England	Wembley Arena	22,209 / 22,368	$2,557,957
November 2, 2009	Sheffield	England	Sheffield Arena	10,277 / 11,000	$1,183,332
November 3, 2009	Birmingham	England	National Indoor Arena	11,692 / 11,692	$1,342,634
November 6, 2009	London	England	Wembley Arena		
Oceania
December 1, 2009	Melbourne	Australia	Rod Laver Arena		
December 2, 2009	Melbourne	Australia	Rod Laver Arena		
December 5, 2009	Hunter Valley	Australia	Hope Estate Winery		
December 7, 2009	Sydney	Australia	Acer Arena		
December 8, 2009	Sydney	Australia	Acer Arena		
December 11, 2009	Perth	Australia	Members Equity Stadium		
December 12, 2009	Perth	Australia	Members Equity Stadium		
December 15, 2009	Brisbane	Australia	Brisbane Entertainment Center		
December 16, 2009	Brisbane	Australia	Brisbane Entertainment Center		
December 19, 2009	New Plymouth	New Zealand	TSB Bowl of Brooklands		
December 20, 2009	New Plymouth	New Zealand	TSB Bowl of Brooklands		

== Cancelled shows ==
Date	City	Country	Venue	Reason for cancellation
June 12, 2009	Albany	United States	Times Union Center	Low ticket sales

== Personnel ==
=== Fleetwood Mac ===
- Lindsey Buckingham – lead guitar, vocals
- Stevie Nicks – vocals, tambourine
- John McVie – bass guitar
- Mick Fleetwood – drums, percussion

=== Additional musicians ===
- Brett Tuggle – keyboards, rhythm guitar, backing vocals, maracas on "Oh Well"
- Neale Heywood – rhythm guitar, backing vocals
- Sharon Celani – background vocals
- Jana Andeson – background vocals
- Lori Nicks – background vocals
