= The Ledge (song) =

Song by Fleetwood Mac

from the album Tusk
- Released: 1979
- Recorded: June 1978 – June 1979
- Studio: The Village Recorder, Lindsey Buckingham's home studio
- Genre: Post-punk; new wave
- Length: 2:08
- Label: Warner Bros.
- Songwriter: Lindsey Buckingham
- Producers: Fleetwood Mac, Richard Dashut, Ken Caillat

"The Ledge" is a song by the British-American rock band Fleetwood Mac, released in 1979. It is the second song from the multi-Platinum Tusk album and was composed by Fleetwood Mac guitarist Lindsey Buckingham. The band rehearsed "The Ledge" several times for the Tusk Tour, although it was ultimately not included in the set.

== Background ==
Buckingham introduced "The Ledge" to Fleetwood Mac under the working title "Can't Walk Out of Here" in June 1978. During an early recording session for Tusk, Buckingham was the last to arrive at the studio, which was uncharacteristic of him according to Ken Caillat, who served as the producer for the Tusk album. Earlier that day, Stevie Nicks had played a demo of "Storms" while Christine McVie brought in "Over & Over" and "Brown Eyes". Upon his arrival, Buckingham insisted that the band work on "The Ledge" first.

Following the play-through of "The Ledge" on his cassette, Buckingham plugged his Gibson Les Paul into a Marshall amplifier and a direct box so that Caillat could achieve a suitable guitar tone. Once this was accomplished, Buckingham directed Caillat to turn all of the knobs 180 degrees in the other direction. Caillat objected to this, arguing that it would ruin the guitar tone. After further discussion, they ultimately came to an agreement to emphasize the bottom end of the instrument.

== Recording ==
On 24 June 1978, the band minus Nicks ran through several passes of "The Ledge". (Note: The liner notes for the 2015 deluxe edition of Tusk listed "I Know I'm Not Wrong" as the first song recorded for the album, which took place on 26 June 1978. Caillat provided a different account, stating that the sessions for "The Ledge" occurred two days earlier on Mick Fleetwood's birthday.) For these series of run-throughs, Buckingham used a Fender Statocaster as opposed to the Gibson Les Paul he used the previous day. Engineer Hernán Rojas plugged the Stratocaster into a Fender Twin amplifier, which was set up in an isolation room and picked up by two microphones. John McVie was stationed next to Mick Fleetwood's drum kit, which included a 26-inch kick drum muted with a pillow and a snare drum that was "tuned so high it sounded as though he was hitting a trash can lid." The drums were tuned by Richard Dashut, who made it a practice to adjust the tension of the drumheads before every recording session. Christine McVie initially played a bluesy part on a Yamaha keyboard, but Buckingham asked her to switch to a Hammond B3 organ after the first take. The band spent the next two hours completing seven takes of the song before Buckingham called the session off.

The final version that appeared on the album was primarily recorded at Buckingham's home studio with a bass guitar and an electric guitar tuned down an octave. He recorded a series of vocal tracks into a microphone on the floor while kneeling in his bathroom and called his "four or five vocal" tracks "not particularly tight". Buckingham wanted the guitar to resemble the higher notes of a bass guitar, "not like a baritone guitar, where it's correct, but where it's actually a little incorrect". His original intention was to include the other members of Fleetwood Mac on the recording, but he instead removed their parts and recorded all of the instruments himself, reckoning that "there was nothing for John or Christine to do."

Buckingham recalled that "The Ledge" provoked a strong reaction from some people he encountered; he believed that nothing on the song was "that radical". He labelled "The Ledge" one of his favorite songs on Tusk "because it goes by so quickly that it almost sounds rushed." In his book Get Tusked, Caillat described the song as "lyrically edgy yet so musically pleasing that [the song] didn't come off as spiteful." Buckingham said that his intention was to make the lyrics sound musical and believed that there could have been "something subconscious about the lyrics."

== Critical reception ==
Sam Anderson of The New York Times Magazine described "The Ledge" as "a noisy, bouncing fuzz-monster that makes no kind of sense in the universe of mainstream '70s radio pop. The band's signature vocals are buried in the mix, roughed up, uglified; there are chants, whispers, moans and shouts. It sounds as if it were recorded live on a whaling ship in heavy seas. You can practically hear the record executives shrieking in the background." Writing for the Hartford Courant, Henry McNulty characterised "The Ledge" as an "iconoclastic" and "electric" song that resembles "a number of incomplete ideas jammed together."

Mojo magazine felt that the song resembled a "deranged circus" with "drums stomping like a seaboot dance" and contrasted it with the "blissfully minimalist sophistication on 'Over And Over'". They further likened the song's guitar tones with something as "ungainly as a very fat man sprinting" and noted the " loating, nagging, slurry and barely comprehensible" vocal delivery from Buckingham. Kris Needs of KQED said that the song is "a complete change of pace" from the opening song on the album, "Over & Over". Mike Mettler of Sound & Vision described "The Ledge" as a "man-alone tune that foreshadows Buckingham’s quirky mad-genius 1984 Go Insane solo album, powered by way of a front-right-embedded detuned guitar riff riddled with much punkish intent."

Rolling Stone labeled "The Ledge" as "the album's most punk-influenced track". The publication also ranked the song number 47 on its list of the best Fleetwood Mac songs, calling it a "happily demented leap into post-punk primitivism and noise for its own sake." For its list of the top 30 greatest Fleetwood Mac songs, The Guardian ranked "The Ledge" at number 11 for "plunging the listener into the album's strangeness". They praised "The Ledge's" "fantastic melody" and said that the song resembled "Never Going Back Again" without its musical arrangement of "downtuned, off-key electric guitars" and vocal harmonies "drowned in echo". Pitchfork wrote that "The Ledge" was a memorable and strange song "in which the band's signature harmonies are overridden by a guitar that's been tuned down and turned up."

== Personnel ==
- Lindsey Buckingham – guitars, bass, drums, lead and backing vocals
- Mick Fleetwood – possible snare drum (Note: Buckingham has stated that he played all of the instruments on "The Ledge", although Hernán Rojas said in Get Tusked that Fleetwood's snare drum track from the original recording session appears on the final recording.)
