= That's Enough for Me =

"That’s Enough For Me"

Song by Fleetwood Mac

from the album Tusk
- A-side: "Sara"
- Released: 1979
- Recorded: 1978–1979
- Studio: The Village Recorder
- Genre: Psychobilly; blues rock; experimental; cowpunk
- Length: 1:51
- Label: Warner Bros.
- Songwriter: Lindsey Buckingham
- Producers: Fleetwood Mac, Richard Dashut, Ken Caillat

"That's Enough For Me" is a song by Fleetwood Mac from their twelfth studio album Tusk. It was one of nine songs from the album composed and sung by Lindsey Buckingham, who also supplied all of the instrumentation on "That's Enough For Me". The song was released a B-side to "Sara" in December 1979 and is the shortest song on the album.

== Background ==
The working title for "That's Enough For Me" was "Out on the Road", which Buckingham recorded at his home on a MCI 16-track in 1978. The song carried the working title of "Out on the Road" through the month of December.

Buckingham described That's Enough For Me as "rockabilly on acid" and sought to pull from several reference points when developing the song. He drew some influence from New wave music and did not actively seek to emulate any particular artist when writing "That"s Enough For Me".

Musically, the song is built around a fast finger-picking technique that Buckingham originally learned in his youth while playing along to Kingston Trio records. It follows a I-IV-V-I chord progression and possesses a tempo of around 254 BPM. When performed live on the Tusk Tour, it was played at an even faster tempo. Buckingham originally considered giving the song a more relaxed feel by recording the song at a tape speed of 15 ips rather than 30 ips, but he instead settled on a faster tempo. Commenting on the final recording, Buckingham said that the song "couldn't be any faster."

The song's lyrics consist of one short verse and a largely wordless chorus consisting of "yeahs" and other vocalisations. In an interview with Paul Zollo, Buckingham said that the song may have been about his relationship with Nicks and believed that the lyrics were "heartfelt", "raucous" and "sad".

== Recording ==
When Buckingham brought the demo to Studio D of The Village Recorder, he requested that Ken Caillat leave the studio so he could work on the song with Richard Dashut and Hernan Rojas, who engineered the Tusk sessions. Buckingham originally utilized other members of Fleetwood Mac during the song's early tracking, including Christine McVie, who played honky-tonk piano fills and glissandos. However, the final recording only features instrumental contributions from Buckingham. Part of the song was recorded in Buckingham's bathroom. A 5-watt Pignose 7-100 guitar amplifier was placed on an empty toilet for the fuzz guitars. On the multitrack recording, one of the tracks was labelled "Porcelain God", which provided the sound of a toilet flushing.

Buckingham recorded several tracks of electric guitars and normal speed through a Fuzz Face effects box. He also recorded an electric bass guitar, acoustic bass, kick drum, snare drum, and a lead vocal, which were all completed in the absence of Caillat. Overdub sessions continued for a few more weeks until Caillat returned to the studio. After recording a few more new takes of "That's Enough For Me", Buckingham reinforced the rhythms tracks by layering additional snare and kick drums through a M160 microphone situated in close proximity to the instruments and a ribbon M360 microphone placed at a distance.

Some acoustic, electric, and resonator guitars were recorded at low speed and later sped up to achieve a high-pitched "fingerpicked frenzy of sound". Buckingham tripled his vocals during the verses and layered additional voices for the chorus, which were recorded at different speeds to achieve different timbres. McVie and Stevie Nicks both contributed backing vocals to the song, although their additions were made barely audible in the final mix. When asked by Musician magazine if he viewed certain tracks without the instrumental contributions of other members to be Fleetwood Mac songs, Buckingham speculated that the rest of the band did not view them as such.

== Critical reception ==
Nick Kent of NME wrote that the song was "a thrillingly dervish-fast blues rocker" with a "wicked bass drum mule kick and Buckingham's sawing electric rhythm guitar." Writing for Melody Maker, Simon Reynolds likened the song to a "hillbilly boogies" and the sound of "Carl Perkins filtered through Boston's 'More Than A Feeling'".

AllMusic's Stephen Thomas Erlewine described That's Enough For Me as a "rampaging" song that contrasted with the mellower compositions on Tusk. Rob Brunner of Entertainment Weekly identified "That's Enough For Me" as one of Tusk's many good songs, which in his opinion helped make up for the album's "lack of cohesion and consistency". Kris Needs of Record Collector thought that the song reflected Buckingham desire to faithfully evoke the rawness of early rock and roll records, further adding that it along with "Not That Funny" and "I Know I'm Not Wrong" "reveal a coke-provoked creative psyche teetering towards the unhinged."

== Personnel ==
- Lindsey Buckingham – electric guitars, acoustic guitars, electric and acoustic bass guitars, Dobro, drums, lead and backing vocals
- Christine McVie – backing vocals
- Stevie Nicks – backing vocals
