= Over & Over (Fleetwood Mac song) =

Song by Fleetwood Mac

from the album Tusk
- Released: 1979
- Recorded: 1978–1979
- Genre: Soft rock
- Length: 4:34
- Label: Warner Bros.
- Songwriter(s): Christine McVie
- Producer(s): Fleetwood Mac, Richard Dashut, Ken Caillat

"Over & Over" is a song by British-American rock band Fleetwood Mac, released in 1979. It is the opening song from the multi-platinum Tusk album and was composed by Fleetwood Mac keyboardist Christine McVie. The song was played on the Tusk Tour and also appeared on the Live album in 1980.

== Background ==
"Over & Over" was among the first two songs McVie presented to the band for the Tusk sessions along with "Brown Eyes". Upon listening to the song, Lindsey Buckingham was reminded of McVie's "Warm Ways" from the band's 1975 eponymous release, which inspired him to play slide guitar on "Over & Over". During the song's bridge, Buckingham switched over to a fingerpicking technique on his Fender Stratocaster, which he continued to play for the remainder of the song. He also added some muted strums on an acoustic guitar throughout the recording, including the intro. Buckingham commented that the band decided to leave the song "in a fairly raw state, not too glossy in the production."

Dennis Wilson, who was dating McVie at the time, was in the studio while the band was recording "Over & Over". During the session, Wilson suggested some vocal parts to McVie by singing through the talkback button. One of his ideas was to take the descending chord progression from the song's chorus and incorporate it into the section after the final verse. He also suggested softer background vocals during this section, which the band agreed to. McVie and Stevie Nicks assembled around a piano while Buckingham worked out some potential voicings for them to sing. He placed special attention on these harmonies to ensure that no overlap existed between their parts. McVie redid her lead vocals for "Over & Over" in December 1978.

While the band was tracking backing vocals, Buckingham snuck in the phrase "over bend over" during the ending section. A bass synthesizer was added to obscure this lyric, which Buckingham sang in his highest register. Ken Caillat, who served as the producer for the Tusk album, said in his book Get Tusked that he was fond of the crescendo that occurs at the song's climax, which features the introduction of a bass synthesizer, McVie's Hammond organ, and drum fills played by Mick Fleetwood. During the sequencing of Tusk, the band decided to place "Over and Over" first in the track listing as they believed that the song possessed "a certain familiarity to it" and would set listeners up for the more unconventional material found later on the album.

== Critical reception ==
Retrospective reviewers have noted the contrast between "Over & Over", the opening track on Tusk, and the following song, "The Ledge". Kris Needs of KQED wrote that the song "opens the album slowly...and is followed by a complete change of pace". Sam Anderson of The New York Times Magazine stated that "Over & Over" is "quintessential Fleetwood Mac: classic FM-radio easy listening — an absolute top-shelf lighter-swaying anthem. Not a note is out of place." He further highlighted the "liquid guitar solo" at the end of "Over & Over", which transitions into "The Ledge", a song that pushed "the band's whole multiplatinum, radio-friendly sound — directly off a steep and treacherous cliff". Writing for Mojo magazine, Phil Sutcliffe felt that the song's "blissfully minimalist sophistication" was the perfect antithesis" to "The Ledge".

Kris Needs of Record Collector thought that it was a bold decision to open Tusk with "Over & Over", which they labeled as a "touching ballad". In the 2015 liner notes for the deluxe edition of Tusk, Jim Irvin called "Over & Over" a "particularly unlikely candidate for the role of opening track". Ben Allen of GQ labeled "Over & Over" as one of the band's best post-Rumours songs, saying that it was "placed at the beginning of the album to lull listeners into a false sense of security that things are going to be just like they were before". He said that the lyrics to "Over & Over" were replete with anxiety, including the line "Could you ever need me, and would you know how?", and also added that the song sonically resembled material from Rumours. Rob Brunner of Entertainment Weekly identified "Over & Over" as one of Tusk's many good songs, which in his opinion helped make up for the album's "lack of cohesion and consistency".

== Personnel ==
- Mick Fleetwood – drums, percussion
- John McVie – bass guitar
- Christine McVie – keyboards, lead and backing vocals
- Lindsey Buckingham – guitars, backing vocals
- Stevie Nicks – backing vocals
