= Not That Funny =

Single by Fleetwood Mac

from the album Tusk
- B-side: "Save Me a Place" (UK) "Think About Me" (EU)
- Released: 7 March 1980 (UK)
- Recorded: 1979
- Studio: The Village Recorder, Los Angeles, California
- Genre: New wave; power pop
- Length: 3:11
- Label: Warner Bros.
- Songwriter: Lindsey Buckingham
- Producers: Fleetwood Mac; Richard Dashut; Ken Caillat

Fleetwood Mac singles chronology
"Sara" (1980)	"Not That Funny" (1980)	"Think About Me" (1980)

"Not That Funny" is a song by British-American rock band Fleetwood Mac, released in 1980. Composed and sung by guitarist Lindsey Buckingham, it was written as a response to the punk movement in the late 1970s. The song shares some lyrics with "I Know I'm Not Wrong", another Buckingham penned song that appeared on the Tusk album. In select European countries, "Not That Funny" was issued as the third single from the Tusk album, although the song failed to chart. Since its release, the song has been performed live on several Fleetwood Mac tours.

== Background ==
"Not That Funny" was derived from an unused Buckingham song titled "Needles and Pins", originally recorded in June 1978. "Needles and Pins" later split into two different songs, "Not That Funny" and "I Know I'm Not Wrong", both of which share the "don't blame me" lyrics found in the chorus and the "here comes the nighttime" lyrics found in the bridge. Carol Ann Harris, who was in a romantic relationship with Buckingham at the time of the song's recording, commented in her memoir that she witnessed an angrier shift in Buckingham's temperament when he wrote the song, which she believed was a radical departure from his disposition compared to the making of other songs like "That's All for Everyone".

Buckingham performed his vocal part on the ground in a push-up position to achieve the desired vocal take. He also insisted on recording the vocals in a replica of his own personal bathroom, which was installed in Studio D of the Village Recorder studio in Los Angeles. To satisfy Buckingham's request, Ken Caillat, who served as the album's co-producer and engineer, taped a microphone to the bathroom's tile floor. Each chorus features slightly different lyrics, which comprise terse statements centered around chastisement. Buckingham commented that the song's lyrics were directed at Stevie Nicks, celebrity culture within the entertainment industry, and the band's image.

Some of the electric guitars were detuned and recorded at high speed before being slowed down to 30 inches per second. Buckingham multitracked the electric guitar parts on a Stratocaster and treated the instrument with a variable speed oscillator (VSO) to achieve a phasing effect. The electric guitars were also sent through a tape recorder and mixing console to achieve a lower pitched, compressed, and thicker sound. The inverse occurred for the acoustic guitars, which were recorded at a slower speed and sped up with the VSO so that the instrument would resemble a harpsichord or music box. Buckingham played the acoustic guitars sparingly on the verses but used them more extensively during the bridge and chorus with an eighth and sixteenth note feel.

For the drums, Buckingham layered several tracks of kick and snare drums and overdubbed tom drum fills leading to the vamp. The vocals were tripled, some of which were sung by Christine McVie. Fleetwood Mac engineer Hernán Rojas commented that Buckingham often asked McVie to help out with vocals on his songs due to their vocal blend. Buckingham also played the cello setting on a Chamberlin M1 keyboard to provide additional textures to the rhythm track.

== Release and live performances ==
"Not That Funny" was released as the third single from Tusk in certain European countries, including the UK, Germany, and The Netherlands. "Think About Me", which appeared as the B-side to "Not That Funny" in the Netherlands, was issued as the third single in North America instead. Both singles were also slightly remixed for radio, with these mixes later appearing on the 2015 deluxe edition of Tusk. While "Think About Me" reached the top 20 in the US, "Not That Funny" failed to chart at all, but it did receive some airplay in the UK, including on BRMB and Radio Clyde. Hernan Rojas, who engineered Tusk, expressed surprise that Buckingham selected "Not That Funny" as the album's third single instead of "I Know I'm Not Wrong".

Despite the lack of initial success, the song became a live staple at Fleetwood Mac concerts. Played live, the song took on an entirely new arrangement – stretched out to almost nine minutes frequently. Buckingham commented that "Not That Funny" was "very different live than on Tusk" and believed that these renditions would "surprise some people". A live recording of "Not That Funny" from Fleetwood Mac's performance in Cleveland was included on their 1980 Live album. Blair Jackson of BAM magazine described this version as a "bopping, shaking, and, ultimately, exploding rocker".

For the Tusk Tour, Fleetwood Mac wanted their keyboard tech, Jeff Sova, to play synthesizers on the song to recreate some of the additional sounds heard on the record. However, this idea was dropped as it was interfering with his stage work. Instead, the only keyboard used on the song was a Yamaha console piano, played by Christine McVie. The band also performed "Not That Funny" on the Mirage tour, The Dance tour, and the Live 2013 tour. A live recording from the band's 21 October 1982 performance at The Forum in Los Angeles appeared on the band's deluxe edition of Mirage in 2016 and their Mirage Tour '82 album in 2024. When performed live on their The Dance Tour in 1997, the song featured a percussion solo from Mick Fleetwood where he used a computerised vest with pads that triggered various sound effects when tapped.

== Critical reception ==
"Not That Funny" has generally received positive reception. Stephen Holden, a reviewer for Rolling Stone, compared the production of the track to a beautifully recorded basement tape. Another reviewer from Rolling Stone pointed similarities in the guitar work between "Not That Funny" and a Go Insane track, "Loving Cup". Raoul Hernandez of The Austin Chronicle said that "Not That Funny" perfectly demonstrates Buckingham's ability to craft pop/rock songs, and that it reveals the "staleness" of Rumours. In his review of Tusk for NME, Nick Kent described "Not That Funny" as "a Cajun-style bruising thump-up with a fade-out all too redolent of more White Album idiocies."

In Rock of Ages: The Rolling Stone History of Rock & Roll, the authors characterised "Not That Funny" as an "anti-pop song that is little more than Buckingham yelling 'Well, it's not that funny, is it?', over and over until his vocal cords fray and shred and finally give way." Ed Harrison of Billboard thought that song's instrumentation evoked a "youthful new wave band." Record Mirror said that there was "nothing to be embarrassed about listening to" the "rocky" remixed single, which the publication predicted would be a "minor hit". Music Week dismissed "Not That Funny" as "a rock pounder which has a beat but nothing else." They also questioned its release as a single and anticipated that the song would struggle commercially.

Retrospectively, Marcello Carlin of Uncut described it as a "disturbing" song "on which Buckingham’s near-psychotic guitar and vocal screams approach Pere Ubu territory." In his piece for Melody Maker's Unknown Pleasures guide, Simon Reynolds drew comparison to Faust's "It's a Bit of Pain" (1973), and praised Buckingham's "hornet-in-your-earhole fuzz solo". David Bennun of The Quietus wrote that "Not That Funny" resembles the music of Devo. Annie Zaleski of The Guardian has commented that while some of Fleetwood Mac's songwriting peers of the 1960s and 1970s "incorporated dance influences and synthesisers" to varying levels of success, the group's "new wave nod", "Not That Funny", was a "transformative" example.

== Personnel ==
- Lindsey Buckingham – lead vocal, electric, acoustic, and bass guitars, Chamberlin, drums
- Christine McVie – additional vocals
