= On with the Show (concert tour) =

2014–15 concert tour by Fleetwood Mac

- Tour by Fleetwood Mac
- Promotional poster
- Start date: September 30, 2014
- End date: November 22, 2015
- Legs: 3
- No. of shows: 81 in North America; 23 in Europe; 16 in Oceania; 120 total
- Box office: US$199.2 million

Fleetwood Mac concert chronology
- Fleetwood Mac Live (2013); On with the Show (2014–15); An Evening with Fleetwood Mac (2018–19)

On with the Show was a world tour by rock band Fleetwood Mac. The tour began in Minneapolis, Minnesota, on 30 September 2014 and concluded in Auckland, New Zealand, on 22 November 2015. Tickets were offered through a pre-sale from 31 March to 6 April 2014, before going on general sale on 7 April 2014. In its 2014 year-end report, Pollstar ranked the tour 13th on its "Top 100 Worldwide Tours", reporting earnings of $79.2 million from 40 shows in North America. In Pollstar's 2015 year-end rankings, the tour placed sixth, with a reported gross of $125.1 million from 78 shows, bringing the cumulative gross to $199.2 million.

Following the departure of Lindsey Buckingham in 2018 and death of Christine McVie in 2022, On with the Show became Fleetwood Mac's final tour featuring the band's most successful lineup of Lindsey Buckingham, Mick Fleetwood, Christine McVie, John McVie, and Stevie Nicks.

== Background and development ==
On 13 January 2014, band publicist Liz Rosenberg announced that Christine McVie would rejoin Fleetwood Mac, after having left the group in 1998. Rosenberg also stated that a new album and tour were planned. The band spent time in March 2014 working on new material, but later confirmed that no new releases would be issued until after the tour. Tour dates were announced on 27 March 2014, with tickets going on general sale on 7 April 2014.

On 9 October 2014, the band announced a second North American leg, adding 28 additional shows from 16 January 2015 in St. Paul, Minnesota, to 31 March 2015 in Wichita, Kansas. In November 2014, Mick Fleetwood announced on BBC Radio 2 that Fleetwood Mac would tour Britain in May and June 2015. Due to high demand, additional dates were added, extending the British leg into July 2015. The Manchester Arena concert scheduled for 12 June 2015 was cancelled due to illness within the band.

== Set list ==
This set list is representative of the performance on 6 October 2014 and does not reflect all concerts throughout the tour.

1. "The Chain"
2. "You Make Loving Fun"
3. "Dreams"
4. "Second Hand News"
5. "Rhiannon"
6. "Everywhere"
7. "I Know I'm Not Wrong" or "Bleed to Love Her"
8. "Tusk"
9. "Sisters of the Moon" or "Sara"
10. "Say You Love Me"
11. "Seven Wonders" (dropped after North American leg)
12. "Big Love"
13. "Landslide"
14. "Never Going Back Again"
15. "Over My Head" or "Think About Me"
16. "Gypsy"
17. "Little Lies"
18. "Gold Dust Woman"
19. "I'm So Afraid"
20. "Go Your Own Way"
  Encore 1
21. "World Turning"
22. "Don't Stop"
23. "Silver Springs"
  Encore 2
24. "Songbird" (not performed on selected 2015 dates)

== Shows ==
List of concerts, showing date, city, country, venue, tickets sold, number of available tickets and amount of gross revenue
Date	City	Country	Venue	Attendance	Revenue
North America
September 30, 2014	Minneapolis	United States	Target Center	15,228 / 15,228	$1,862,320
October 2, 2014	Chicago	United States	United Center	—	—
October 3, 2014	Chicago	United States	United Center	—	—
October 6, 2014	New York City	United States	Madison Square Garden	—	—
October 7, 2014	New York City	United States	Madison Square Garden	—	—
October 10, 2014	Boston	United States	TD Garden	—	—
October 11, 2014	Newark	United States	Prudential Center	—	—
October 14, 2014	Pittsburgh	United States	Consol Energy Center	—	—
October 15, 2014	Philadelphia	United States	Wells Fargo Center	30,767 / 30,767	$4,064,590
October 18, 2014	Toronto	Canada	Air Canada Centre	17,045 / 17,045	$2,248,330
October 19, 2014	Columbus	United States	Nationwide Arena	—	—
October 21, 2014	Indianapolis	United States	Bankers Life Fieldhouse	—	—
October 22, 2014	Auburn Hills	United States	The Palace of Auburn Hills	13,805 / 13,805	$1,644,828
October 25, 2014	Boston	United States	TD Garden	—	—
October 26, 2014	Ottawa	Canada	Canadian Tire Centre	—	—
October 29, 2014	Philadelphia	United States	Wells Fargo Center	(Note: The score data is representative of the two shows at the Wells Fargo Center on October 15 and 29)	
October 31, 2014	Washington, D.C.	United States	Verizon Center	15,133 / 15,133	$1,972,474
November 1, 2014	Hartford	United States	XL Center	—	—
November 10, 2014	Winnipeg	Canada	MTS Centre	—	—
November 12, 2014	Saskatoon	Canada	SaskTel Centre	—	—
November 14, 2014	Calgary	Canada	Scotiabank Saddledome	—	—
November 15, 2014	Edmonton	Canada	Rexall Place	—	—
November 18, 2014	Vancouver	Canada	Rogers Arena	—	—
November 20, 2014	Tacoma	United States	Tacoma Dome	—	—
November 22, 2014	Portland	United States	Moda Center	—	—
November 24, 2014	Sacramento	United States	Sleep Train Arena	—	—
November 25, 2014	San Jose	United States	SAP Center at San Jose	—	—
November 28, 2014	Inglewood	United States	The Forum	—	—
November 29, 2014	Inglewood	United States	The Forum	—	—
December 2, 2014	San Diego	United States	Viejas Arena	—	—
December 3, 2014	Oakland	United States	Oracle Arena	—	—
December 6, 2014	Inglewood	United States	The Forum	—	—
December 7, 2014	Anaheim	United States	Honda Center	13,846 / 13,846	$1,456,316
December 10, 2014	Phoenix	United States	US Airways Center	—	—
December 12, 2014	Denver	United States	Pepsi Center	—	—
December 14, 2014	Dallas	United States	American Airlines Center	27,039 / 28,827	$3,477,015
December 15, 2014	Houston	United States	Toyota Center	12,983 / 12,983	$1,837,886
December 17, 2014	Atlanta	United States	Philips Arena	15,591 / 15,591	$1,917,322
December 19, 2014	Sunrise	United States	BB&T Center	—	—
December 20, 2014	Tampa	United States	Amalie Arena	15,675 / 15,675	$1,913,409
January 16, 2015	St. Paul	United States	Xcel Energy Center	—	—
January 17, 2015	Lincoln	United States	Pinnacle Bank Arena	—	—
January 20, 2015	Grand Rapids	United States	Van Andel Arena	10,204 / 10,204	$1,409,578
January 22, 2015	New York City	United States	Madison Square Garden	—	—
January 24, 2015	Atlantic City	United States	Boardwalk Hall	13,154 / 13,154	$1,734,803
January 25, 2015	Uniondale	United States	Nassau Coliseum	—	—
January 28, 2015	Providence	United States	Dunkin' Donuts Center	—	—
January 30, 2015	Washington, D.C.	United States	Verizon Center	13,792 / 14,612	$1,842,654
January 31, 2015	Buffalo	United States	First Niagara Center	—	—
February 3, 2015	Toronto	Canada	Air Canada Centre	15,029 / 15,029	$1,805,430
February 5, 2015	Montreal	Canada	Bell Centre	10,376 / 12,065	$1,041,360
February 7, 2015	Uncasville	United States	Mohegan Sun Arena	7,542 / 7,542	$1,377,570
February 8, 2015	Newark	United States	Prudential Center	—	—
February 11, 2015	Des Moines	United States	Wells Fargo Arena	—	—
February 12, 2015	Milwaukee	United States	BMO Harris Bradley Center	—	—
February 14, 2015	Rosemont	United States	Allstate Arena	—	—
February 17, 2015	Louisville	United States	KFC Yum! Center	15,747 / 15,747	$1,563,087
February 18, 2015	Cleveland	United States	Quicken Loans Arena	—	—
March 1, 2015	Austin	United States	Frank Erwin Center	13,468 / 13,749	$1,663,940
March 3, 2015	Houston	United States	Toyota Center	10,574 / 11,729	$1,457,763
March 4, 2015	Dallas	United States	American Airlines Center	(Note: The score data is representative of the both shows at the American Airlines Center on December 14 and March 4 respectively.)	
March 7, 2015	Charlotte	United States	Time Warner Cable Arena	—	—
March 8, 2015	Knoxville	United States	Thompson–Boling Arena	—	—
March 15, 2015	Charlottesville	United States	John Paul Jones Arena	—	—
March 17, 2015	Greensboro	United States	Greensboro Coliseum	—	—
March 18, 2015	Nashville	United States	Bridgestone Arena	16,491 / 16,491	$1,812,977
March 21, 2015	Miami	United States	American Airlines Arena	—	—
March 23, 2015	Orlando	United States	Amway Center	12,711 / 13,472	$1,590,707
March 25, 2015	Atlanta	United States	Philips Arena	13,711 / 13,711	$1,600,265
March 27, 2015	St. Louis	United States	Scottrade Center	—	—
March 28, 2015	Kansas City	United States	Sprint Center	—	—
March 31, 2015	Wichita	United States	Intrust Bank Arena	11,042 / 11,325	$1,400,765
April 1, 2015	Denver	United States	Pepsi Center	—	—
April 4, 2015	Vancouver	Canada	Rogers Arena	—	—
April 6, 2015	Bakersfield	United States	Rabobank Arena	—	—
April 7, 2015	Oakland	United States	Oracle Arena	—	—
April 10, 2015	Inglewood	United States	The Forum	25,343 / 25,343	$2,837,833
April 11, 2015	Las Vegas	United States	MGM Grand Garden Arena	—	—
April 14, 2015	Inglewood	United States	The Forum	(Note: The score data is representative of the both shows at The Forum on April 10 and 14 respectively.)	
April 17, 2015	Oklahoma City	United States	Chesapeake Energy Arena	—	—
April 19, 2015	North Little Rock	United States	Verizon Arena	—	—
Europe
May 27, 2015	London	England	The O2 Arena	96,564 / 99,145	$12,388,700
May 28, 2015	London	England	The O2 Arena	96,564 / 99,145	$12,388,700
May 31, 2015	Amsterdam	Netherlands	Ziggo Dome	—	—
June 1, 2015	Amsterdam	Netherlands	Ziggo Dome	—	—
June 4, 2015	Cologne	Germany	Lanxess Arena	—	—
June 6, 2015	Antwerp	Belgium	Sportpaleis	15,086 / 15,863	$1,566,050
June 8, 2015	Birmingham	England	Genting Arena	—	—
June 14, 2015 (Note: This concert is part of the Isle of Wight Festival)	Newport	England	Seaclose Park	—	—
June 16, 2015	Glasgow	Scotland	SSE Hydro	—	—
June 17, 2015	Glasgow	Scotland	SSE Hydro	—	—
June 20, 2015	Dublin	Ireland	3Arena	—	—
June 22, 2015	London	England	The O2 Arena	(Note: The score data is representative of the six shows at The O2 Arena on May 27 and 28, June 22, 24, 26 and 27 respectively.)	
June 24, 2015	London	England	The O2 Arena	(Note: The score data is representative of the six shows at The O2 Arena on May 27 and 28, June 22, 24, 26 and 27 respectively.)	
June 26, 2015	London	England	The O2 Arena	(Note: The score data is representative of the six shows at The O2 Arena on May 27 and 28, June 22, 24, 26 and 27 respectively.)	
June 27, 2015	London	England	The O2 Arena	(Note: The score data is representative of the six shows at The O2 Arena on May 27 and 28, June 22, 24, 26 and 27 respectively.)	
June 30, 2015	Leeds	England	First Direct Arena	—	—
July 1, 2015	Manchester	England	Manchester Arena	15,414 / 16,255	$2,023,940
July 4, 2015	Birmingham	England	Genting Arena	—	—
July 5, 2015	Leeds	England	First Direct Arena	—	—
July 7, 2015 (Note: The July 7, 2015 show at Genting Arena in Birmingham was originally scheduled to take place on June 9, 2015, but was rescheduled due to illness within the band.)	Birmingham	England	Genting Arena	—	—
July 8, 2015	Glasgow	Scotland	SSE Hydro	—	—
July 10, 2015	Dublin	Ireland	3Arena	—	—
July 11, 2015	Dublin	Ireland	3Arena	—	—
Oceania
October 22, 2015	Sydney	Australia	Allphones Arena	39,577 / 39,577	$5,425,100
October 24, 2015	Sydney	Australia	Allphones Arena	39,577 / 39,577	$5,425,100
October 25, 2015	Sydney	Australia	Allphones Arena	39,577 / 39,577	$5,425,100
October 28, 2015	Adelaide	Australia	Coopers Stadium	—	—
October 30, 2015	Perth	Australia	Domain Stadium	—	—
November 2, 2015	Melbourne	Australia	Rod Laver Arena	—	—
November 4, 2015	Melbourne	Australia	Rod Laver Arena	—	—
November 6, 2015	Melbourne	Australia	Rod Laver Arena	—	—
November 7, 2015	Geelong	Australia	Mt Duneed Estate	—	—
November 10, 2015	Brisbane	Australia	Brisbane Entertainment Centre	22,725 / 22,725	$3,121,810
November 12, 2015	Brisbane	Australia	Brisbane Entertainment Centre	22,725 / 22,725	$3,121,810
November 14, 2015	Hunter Valley	Australia	Hope Estate Winery	—	—
November 15, 2015	Hunter Valley	Australia	Hope Estate Winery	—	—
November 18, 2015	Dunedin	New Zealand	Forsyth Barr Stadium	—	—
November 21, 2015	Auckland	New Zealand	Mt Smart Stadium	—	—
November 22, 2015	Auckland	New Zealand	Mt Smart Stadium	—	—
Total				545,088 / 554,748	$68,538,950

== Cancelled shows ==
Date	City	Country	Venue	Reason for cancellation
June 12, 2015	Manchester	England	Manchester Arena	Illness within the band

== Personnel ==
- Christine McVie – vocals, keyboards, accordion on "Tusk", maracas on "Everywhere" and "World Turning"
- Stevie Nicks – vocals, tambourine
- Lindsey Buckingham – lead guitar, vocals
- John McVie – bass
- Mick Fleetwood – drums, percussion

Additional musicians

- Brett Tuggle – keyboards, rhythm guitar, samples, backing vocals
- Neale Heywood – rhythm guitar, backing vocals
- Sharon Celani – backing vocals
- Steve Rinkovv – drums, percussion (unannounced from stage)
- Lori Nicks – backing vocals
- Stevvi Alexander – backing vocals
