= Angel (Fleetwood Mac song) =

Single by Fleetwood Mac

from the album Tusk
- B-side: "Sisters of the Moon"
- Released: 1980
- Recorded: April–August 1979
- Studio: The Village Recorder, Los Angeles, California
- Genre: Rock
- Length: 4:54
- Label: Reprise
- Songwriter: Stevie Nicks
- Producers: Fleetwood Mac, Richard Dashut and Ken Caillat

Fleetwood Mac singles chronology
"Think About Me" (1980)	"Angel" (1980)	"Fireflies" (1981)

"Angel" is a song written by singer-songwriter Stevie Nicks of the British-American band Fleetwood Mac. It first appeared on the band's 1979 double album Tusk and was released as a single in the Netherlands the following year.

The song was performed on Fleetwood Mac's 1979-1980 Tusk Tour and has since been issued on a few of the band's deluxe editions, starting with the 2015 super deluxe edition of Tusk, which included a live recording from their performance in St. Louis on 5 November 1979. A 5 May 1980 live recording from the Richfield Coliseum in Ohio was included on the deluxe edition of their Live album. In 2025, Nicks included "Angel" in the setlist for her show in Portland, Oregon, which marked the first time the song was performed live since 1983.

A different Fleetwood Mac song with the same name was written by Bob Welch and included on the band's Heroes are Hard to Find album in 1974. In the liner notes for Welch's Greatest Hits & More – Revisited, he said that the lyrics were about "want[ing] to see an angel" and "understanding whether the angel is a human being".

== Composition ==
Nicks wrote "Angel" about Mick Fleetwood, with particular focus on his fashion choices. "It's about his crazy fob watch and his really beautiful clothes. He's a very stylish individual and I was just this little California girl who never really knew anybody like him." She said in a 1980 documentary on the making of Tusk that "Angel" was her first attempt at writing a "silly" rock n roll song and later identified an "eeriness" to the composition that she initially overlooked.

Hernan Rojas, who served as an engineer for Tusk, described the lyrics as incorporating aspects of Ovid's Metamorphosis, the stories of Mabinogion, Gothic fiction, and personal diary entries. Nicks said that the "charmed hour" lyric referred to "the best hour", which also tied into the three birds of Rhiannon. While writing the song, she also gravitated toward a figure in Welsh mythology named Arawn, partially because several of her family members were named Aaron. She said that the lyric 'So I close my eyes softly/Till I become that part of the wind' related to some of Arawn's powers as the king of the underworld. In a 1981 interview with Blair Jackson of BAM magazine, Nicks identified "Angel" as one of her favorite compositions on Tusk.

== Recording ==
"Angel" was a late addition to Tusk, with initial tracking taking place on 1 April 1979. Take six was selected as the master and overdubbing continued into the month of August. A decision was made to increase the tempo of the song after a few passes, which according to Rojas, allowed for the rhythm section to become more lively. The structure of "Angel" consisted of a verse, bridge, two pre choruses, and two choruses. Rojas said that the song relied on a "powerful groove and dynamic lyrics" to accompany the song's chord progression.

The song was set in 4/4 time, with Mick Fleetwood playing a Tama drum kit with AKG overhead microphones, an AKG 451 on the bottom resonant head of a snare drum, and a D12 on the kick drum. John McVie's bass guitar was connected directly into a Neve mixing console and Christine McVie played a Yamaha electric piano in an isolation room that the band dubbed the "Hawaiian room", which received that name due to the Hawaiian lava rocks that decorated the space. Lindsey Buckingham played a Fender Stratocaster through a Marshall stack placed in a different isolation room.

A recording session in May was filmed by a crew led by Randall Hagadorn, and compiled footage for a Tusk documentary released in 1980. During this session, Buckingham recorded various lead guitar licks and a solo during the song's vamp. Nicks and Buckingham also worked on vocal harmonies around a grand piano with the intention of singing the song as a duet. Buckingham instead settled on singing his vocals in tandem with Nicks for only certain lyrics. His vocals also supplanted a few lines recorded by Nicks, who recorded some of her lead vocals while dancing in platform shoes and pink leg warmers.

== Critical reception ==
Stephen Holden called the song "an especially risky flirtation with hard rock" in his Rolling Stone review for Tusk. In his book Gold Dust Woman: The Biography of Stevie Nicks, Stephen Davis characterised Nicks' vocals on "Angel" as "strong, passionate, and more mature than the voice on Rumours. Terry Jordan of the St. Joseph News-Press discussed "Angel" in his review of the band's 1980 performance in Kansas City, saying that the song was "bright" and "bouncy" and "outshined" all of Buckingham's material onstage.

== Personnel ==
- Stevie Nicks – lead and backing vocals
- Lindsey Buckingham – guitars, backing vocals
- Christine McVie – keyboards, backing vocals
- John McVie – bass guitar
- Mick Fleetwood – drums, percussion
