= Beautiful Child (song) =

1979 song by Fleetwood Mac

Song by Fleetwood Mac

from the album Tusk
- Released: 1979
- Recorded: 1978–1979
- Genre: Soft rock
- Length: 5:21
- Label: Warner Bros.
- Songwriter: Stevie Nicks
- Producers: Fleetwood Mac, Richard Dashut, Ken Caillat

"Beautiful Child" is a song by British-American rock band Fleetwood Mac, released in 1979. Composed and sung by vocalist Stevie Nicks, it was one of her five songs that appeared on the Tusk album. The song was first performed live on the band's 2003–2004 Say You Will Tour, after which she later did an orchestral rendition of the song in Melbourne.

== Background ==
Nicks wrote "Beautiful Child" on a Sunday around midnight and finished the song before dawn. In an interview several months before its release, Nicks described Beautiful Child as "a lullaby" and her "most special song". None of the band members or producers originally asked Nicks what the song was about, believing that the lyrical content was too personal. However, Nicks revealed in 2013 that "Beautiful Child" was written about her affair with Derek Taylor, who formerly served as the road manager for The Beatles and was older than Nicks. The lyric "You fell in love when I was only ten" referred to Taylor's marriage with Joan Taylor in 1958. Nicks commented that the affair was brief since Taylor was married at the time. In the 2015 liner notes to Tusk, Nicks recalled that Taylor would recite poetry to her "in his beautiful English voice" and call her a beautiful child, a comment that irked Nicks. The lyrics detail Nicks' final night with Taylor at The Beverly Hills Hotel and portray a younger girl conveying her love to an older gentleman.

During the recording of "Beautiful Child", a chorus effect was applied to John McVie's bass guitar. A bass synthesiser was also added to supplement the lower frequencies of the bass guitar by playing an octave below the instrument. These instruments enter at the end of verse one along with a snare drum. Producer Ken Caillat applied a reverse echo to the snare drum hits by recording the instrument backwards and printing the echo on two separate tracks so that the echo preceded each snare drum hit.

Rather than record the backing vocals in the same room, Nicks, Christine McVie, and Lindsey Buckingham instead sang their parts individually in an echo chamber situated in Studio D at The Village Recorder. These parts were doubled and faded in and out throughout the song using the studio's mixing console.

Soon after the band recorded the song, UNESCO declared that 1979 was the International Year of the Child, a proclamation intended to promote children's rights by addressing malnutrition, maternal outcomes, and educational disparities, particularly in developing countries. A Music for UNICEF Concert was held at the beginning of 1979 to coincide with the International Year of the Child, although Fleetwood Mac were unable to attend. Nicks instead donated "Beautiful Child" and all of its royalties to the UN fundraising campaign.

== Personnel ==
- Stevie Nicks – lead vocals
- Lindsey Buckingham – guitars, backing vocals
- Christine McVie – keyboards, backing vocals
- John McVie – bass guitar
- Mick Fleetwood – drums

== Bibliography ==
- Blake, Mark (2024). The Many Lives of Fleetwood Mac. New York: Pegasus Books. ISBN 978-1-63936-732-0.
- Caillat, Ken; Rojas, Hernan (2019). Get Tusked: The Inside Story of Fleetwood Mac's Most Anticipated Album. Guilford, Connecticut: Backbeat Books. ISBN 978-1-4930-5983-6.
- Howe, Zoë (2015). Stevie Nicks: Visions, Dreams, & Rumours. Omnibus Press. ISBN 978-1-4683-1066-5.
