= I Know I'm Not Wrong =

Song by Fleetwood Mac

from the album Tusk
- Released: 19 September 1979
- Recorded: 26 June 1978 – August 1979
- Genre: Folk rock; psychedelic rock; blues rock; lo-fi
- Length: 3.02
- Label: Warner Bros.
- Songwriter: Lindsey Buckingham
- Producers: Fleetwood Mac, Richard Dashut, Ken Caillat

"I Know I'm Not Wrong" is a song by Fleetwood Mac from the 1979 double LP Tusk. It was included as the final song of side three of the LP on 19 September 1979 and written by Lindsey Buckingham, whose sparser arrangements and the influence of punk rock and new wave were the leading creative force on it and other Tusk tracks. The song was worked on for the duration of the Tusk album and took around a year to complete.

== Background ==
"I Know I'm Not Wrong" carried the working title of "Lindsey Song #1" and was among the first songs recorded for the Tusk album. It was derived from an unused song titled "Needles and Pins", which later split into two unique songs: "Not That Funny" and "I Know I'm Not Wrong", both of which share certain lyrics during the bridge and chorus. Sessions began on June 26, 1978, with the song's original tracking consisting of Mick Fleetwood on drums, John McVie playing a "limber groove" on the bass guitar, and Christine McVie adding color on keyboards. Over time, Buckingham erased these tracks and replaced them with fuzz guitar, pillows, bongos, and toy pianos.

When recording the rhythm tracks for "I Know I'm Not Wrong", Buckingham sought to avoid the sonic quality of drums found on 1970s records.

I've often looked for alternatives for the function of things such as the snare and hi-hat – anything that would get away from the norm. I'd think, 'What can I do on the two and four that doesn't sound like a snare?'...On Tusk, for example, I used a Kleenex box on 'I Know I’m Not Wrong' and a 24-track tape box on 'Save Me a Place' instead of the snare. Those aren’t really big subversions—especially by today’s standards—but, at the time, they were.

The song went through several different iterations before Buckingham settled on the final recording that appeared on the album. One early version of the song was an instrumental that possessed a "music-box" quality, another was built around an electric twelve-string guitar figure with polyrhythmic drums, while other versions featured wood blocks, toy pianos, heavily reverberated vocals, and "tumbling" drum fills. Buckingham also invited Stevie Nicks to sing backing vocals on the song, but her additions were scrapped.

By April 1979, Buckingham had settled on two Fender Stratocasters for muted strums, two Ovation acoustic guitars for fingerpicking, bends, and strumming, along with some sped up electric guitars that sounded "like a mix between an autoharp or a high-pitched ukulele" according to engineer Hernan Rojas. Some fuzz electric guitars were added to beef up the lower frequencies of Buckingham's Gretsch bass guitar. Buckingham also overdubbed a harmonica part, which was recorded with a Beyer M360 ribbon microphone and doubled. To capture the room ambiance, the harmonica part was projected through the studio using a pair of headphones and a mini portable amplifier, both of which were recorded with a Neumann 87 microphone and compressed using Studio D's Neve mixing console.

== Legacy ==
Cath Carroll, Fleetwood Mac biographer and author of a book on the creation of Rumours, likened the rhythm of "I Know I'm Not Wrong" to that of "The Ledge", another track from the Tusk album. "A silly little synth riff toward the end puts an odd-sounding date stamp on the piece and is, in its perky way, the most jarring element on the album. This song is another piece of brilliant concision, with a half-stated simple three-note chorus." She noted the track's "not-quite-there quality that Buckingham manages to coax out of his higher vocal register" which is common to several Tusk songs. In 2019, The Big Issue wrote that "the jerky power-pop of I Know I’m Not Wrong could be released today and sound in no way dated."

The track "To Wild Homes" on The New Pornographers's record Mass Romantic features the melody of "I Know I'm Not Wrong" where A.C. Newman plays the song's melody over the fading chorus at the end of the track. Newman referred to it as "living proof that Tusk has haunted our music."

== Other versions ==
A different mix of "I Know I'm Not Wrong" was included on the 2004 reissue of Tusk. This version features louder percussion and bass, additional guitars, and a harmonica layered over the synth solo. Along with this recording, three other early demos were included on the reissue; one was an early instrumental recorded at Buckingham's home studio, where Buckingham played all of the instruments. The two other recordings were rough takes recorded with Fleetwood Mac. Six different outtakes of "I Know I'm Not Wrong" were also included on the 2015 reissue of Tusk, many of which had never been commercially released up to that point. Matthew Fiander of PopMatters opined that "while the evolution inherent in six versions of “I Know I’m Not Wrong” seems compelling on paper, in practice none of the takes stand out".

"I Know I'm Not Wrong" was one of the many Tusk tracks rehearsed for the Tusk Tour, but was ultimately cut from the setlist for unknown reasons. However, Fleetwood Mac has performed the song on many recent tours. Its first appearance was in 2003 during the fourth and final leg of the Say You Will Tour, replacing another Buckingham penned song, "Eyes of the World" in the setlist. On that tour, Mick Fleetwood's drum tech Steve Rinkov played additional drums on both songs. "I Know I'm Not Wrong" also appeared on their Unleashed Tour in 2009, and the North American/European leg of their 2014–2015 On with the Show tour.

== Personnel ==
- Lindsey Buckingham – electric, acoustic, and bass guitar, keyboards, drums, percussion, harmonica, lead vocals and backing vocals
