= Save Me a Place =

Song by Fleetwood Mac

from the album Tusk
- A-side: "Think About Me"
- Released: 1979
- Recorded: 1978–1979
- Studio: The Village Recorder, Los Angeles, California
- Length: 2:42
- Label: Warner Bros.
- Songwriter: Lindsey Buckingham
- Producers: Fleetwood Mac; Richard Dashut; Ken Caillat

"Save Me a Place" is a song by the British-American rock band Fleetwood Mac, released in 1979 on the Tusk album. It was one of the nine songs on the album written by Lindsey Buckingham. In North America, the song was issued as the B-side to "Think About Me". "Save Me a Place" was also included on the four–disc edition of the 1992 Fleetwood Mac box set, 25 Years - The Chain.

== Background ==
In the liner notes for the 2015 deluxe edition of Tusk, Buckingham commented that the lyrics on "Save Me a Place" were more vulnerable than his other offerings on the album. He said that the lyrics reflected his need to compartmentalise his feelings due to the lack of closure within his personal life, particularly the dissolution of his relationship with Stevie Nicks and his inability to recapture positive memories from his youth.

Buckingham told The Independent in 2024 that the song was "a reflection of the fact that we were all forging ahead emotionally with our lives, yet there was still, underneath all of that, a great deal of love and tenderness that we had." Buckingham recalled that Brian Wilson heard "Save Me a Place" during a visit to Fleetwood Mac's recording studio and commented that "Bob Dylan would like that". He characterised the final product as "having a folky, organic sound, and maybe even being a little campy. It was somewhere between Hawaiian and some of those fifties things."

== Recording ==
In March 1979, Buckingham invited Mick Fleetwood and John McVie to Studio D of The Village Recorder to record drums and bass guitar respectively to emulate his home recordings of "Save Me a Place" from October 1978. This was at the encouragement of Ken Caillat and Richard Dashut, who insisted that the song would benefit from a re-recording at The Village Recorder. Two demos of "Save Me a Place", one dated 10 October 1978 and another dated 18 October 1978, were included on the deluxe edition of Tusk. His home demos consisted of a twelve-string guitar, an acoustic guitar with a capo, a dampened snare drum playing on the downbeats, and a bass guitar.

For the purpose of creating an arrangement that aligned with his home demos, Buckingham asked Fleetwood to exclusively hit the snare drum on the downbeats and told John McVie to play root notes and avoid all passing tones. Eleven takes were recorded and the sixth was designated as the master. McVie originally recorded his parts on a Gretsch bass, but Buckingham was displeased with the part he recorded, so he invited him back to the control room to attempt a new part on a Gibson violin bass. When this failed to yield a satisfactory result, McVie disposed of his Gretsch bass in a wastebasket, sat next to Fleetwood on a bench and applied gaffer tape to their mouths as a form of protest. Buckingham subsequently retrieved McVie's bass from the trash and played the instrument himself.

When recording the percussion for "Save Me A Place", Buckingham eschewed the snare drum in favor of tapping a 24-track tape box. He also asked Fleetwood to hit a trash can with a pair of brushes, which he doubled. Buckingham also expressed interest in overdubbing a charango that was gifted to him by Hernán Rojas, who engineered the Tusk album. As such, Buckingham tuned the instrument and strummed through a few takes until he was satisfied. The instrument was then panned to the left channel. Buckingham multitracked all of the backing vocals, which were conducted in a way that emulated a barbershop harmony with the use of some major seventh notes. He applied vibrato to the end of the vocal phrasings.

== Critical reception ==
Stephen Holden of Rolling Stone described the song as "sophisticated yet still relatively spare" and said that it "boasts closely harmonized, un-gimmicky ensemble voices and acoustic textures that underline the tune's British folk flavor." Writing for Pitchfork, Amanda Petrusich called the song a lyrical successor to "Go Your Own Way" in which Buckingham "begrudges his lover's unwillingness to grab what he's half-offering her." Certain publications, including CMJ and The Los Angeles Times, highlighted the song's rhythm track.

== Live performances ==
"Save Me a Place" was first performed during Fleetwood Mac's Tusk Tour. A live recording from the band's tour stop in St. Louis on 5 November 1979 was included on the deluxe edition of Tusk in 2015. Buckingham later revived the song as an encore for his 1992–1993 tour promoting his Out of the Cradle album. In a concert review of Buckingham's performance at The Coach House in December 1992, Mike Boehm of The Los Angeles Times said that the vocal harmonies on "Save Me a Place" resembled the work of The Beach Boys. He also played the song in 2006 during the promotion of his Under the Skin album.

== Personnel ==
- Lindsey Buckingham – acoustic guitars, bass guitar, charango, percussion, vocals
- Mick Fleetwood – possible snare drum and trash can (Note: In an interview with Musician magazine, Buckingham said that he played all of the instruments on "Save Me a Place" at his home studio. Buckingham reiterated in a 2003 interview with Mojo magazine that "Save Me a Place" featured no contributions from other band members. Hernán Rojas, who engineered the album, mentioned that a separate master recording was used instead. Rojas said that Buckingham replaced John McVie's bass playing, but did not clarify if all of Fleetwood's drum parts were also scrapped.)
