= Tusk (album) =

1979 studio album by Fleetwood Mac

Studio album by Fleetwood Mac
- Released: 12 October 1979
- Recorded: 1978–1979
- Studios: The Village Recorder, Los Angeles, California
- Genres: Pop rock; soft rock; avant-pop; new wave; experimental; post-punk
- Length: 73:45
- Label: Warner Bros.
- Producers: Fleetwood Mac; Richard Dashut; Ken Caillat

Fleetwood Mac chronology
Rumours (1977)	Tusk (1979)	Live (1980)

Singles from Tusk
- 1. "Tusk" Released: September 1979; 2. "Sara" Released: December 1979; 3. "Not That Funny" Released: March 1980 (UK); 4. "Think About Me" Released: March 1980 (US); 5. "Sisters of the Moon" Released: June 1980 (US); 6. "Angel" Released: July 1980 (Netherlands)

Tusk is the twelfth studio album by the British-American rock band Fleetwood Mac, released as a double album on 12 October 1979 in the United States and on 19 October 1979 in the United Kingdom by Warner Bros. Records. It is considered more experimental than their previous albums, partly as a consequence of Lindsey Buckingham's sparser songwriting arrangements and the influence of post-punk. The production costs were initially estimated to be about $1 million but many years later were revealed to be about $1.4 million (equivalent to $6.21 million in 2025), making it the most expensive rock album recorded to that date.

The band embarked on a nine-month tour to promote Tusk. They travelled extensively across the world, including the US, Australia, New Zealand, Japan, France, Belgium, Germany, the Netherlands, and the UK. In Germany, they shared the bill with Bob Marley. On this world tour, the band recorded music for the Fleetwood Mac Live album, released in 1980.

Compared to 1977's Rumours, which sold ten million copies by February 1978, Tusk was regarded as a commercial failure by the label, selling four million copies. In 2013, NME ranked Tusk at number 445 in their list of "500 Greatest Albums of All Time". The album was also included in the book 1001 Albums You Must Hear Before You Die. In 2000, it was voted number 853 in Colin Larkin's All Time Top 1000 Albums.

== Background ==
Going into Tusk, Lindsey Buckingham was adamant about creating an album that sounded nothing like Rumours. Buckingham commented that he intended for Tusk to subvert the expectations of creating a "Rumours 2 and Rumours 3, which is kind of the business model Warner Bros. would have liked us to follow." Mick Fleetwood decided early on that Tusk was to be a double album. Beach Boys drummer Dennis Wilson, who was dating Christine McVie at the time, offered to host the band at the Beach Boys' studio, which they were planning to renovate. While the band initially agreed to this idea, an attorney for the Beach Boys later told Fleetwood Mac that they would still have to pay for the facility even if they decided not to use it. Fleetwood Mac subsequently backed out of the deal and approached Geordie Hormel, who offered to construct a custom studio for the band at The Village Recorder. Hormel presented them with an option to either purchase the studio or rent it. Fleetwood Mac producer Ken Caillat suggested that the band purchase the studio, reckoning that this would be the cheaper option. However, Fleetwood's attorney opted to rent the custom studio, which was named Studio D.

Buckingham – infatuated with bands such as Talking Heads – was "desperate to make Mac relevant to a post-punk world", according to music journalist Bob Stanley, who commented that, compared to Rumours, Tusk was "unleavened weirdness, as close to its predecessor as the Beach Boys' lo-fi Smiley Smile had been to Pet Sounds. Much of it sounded clattery, half-formed, with strange rhythmic leaps and offbeat tics." Journalist Adam Webb described the Tusk recording sessions as a "cocaine blizzard" from which Christine McVie's then-boyfriend, Beach Boy drummer Dennis Wilson, "never really came out." Music historian Domenic Priore claimed that, for research purposes during the album's recording, Buckingham accessed the master tapes for the Beach Boys' unreleased album Smile, and that the tracks "That's All for Everyone" and "Beautiful Child" most strongly exemplify its influence.

== Recording ==
After the studio was built, Buckingham queried Fleetwood about recording some songs at his home studio. Fleetwood acquiesced, but told Buckingham that the other members of Fleetwood Mac would need to be integrated during the recording sessions. For certain songs, Buckingham played a Kleenex box as a snare drum and had Fleetwood overdub his own drums over Buckingham's demos. Several of Buckingham's songs were recorded at his home studio on a 24-track machine with him playing all of the instruments, including "The Ledge", "Save Me a Place", and "That's Enough for Me".

Caillat recalled that Buckingham's nature in the recording studio was the source of some tension: "He was a maniac. The first day, I set the studio up as usual. Then he said, 'Turn every knob 180 degrees from where it is now and see what happens.' He'd tape microphones to the studio floor and get into a sort of push-up position to sing. Early on, he came in and he'd freaked out in the shower and cut off all his hair with nail scissors. He was stressed." Compared to the sonics of the Rumours album, which featured tighter dynamics, the engineers aimed to achieve a darker sounding album by aiming for fuller low frequencies and more treble. To accomplish this, they recorded the album at a magnetic tape speed of 30 inch per second with the use of a Dolby noise-reduction system to reduce tape hiss. Buckingham was interested in starting a solo career during the making of Tusk and according to Caillat had threatened to leave Fleetwood Mac; the rest of the band acquiesced to Buckingham's desire to create a more experimental album in an effort to appease him. Caillat later expressed his disapproval of Buckingham's proclivity for harsher textures and said that he attempted to bury some of these sounds in the mix.

Production costs rose beyond a million dollars, far more than Rumours. Regarding the album's production costs, guitarist Lindsey Buckingham stated: "During the making of Tusk, we were in the studio for about 10 months and we got 20 songs out of it. Rumours took the same amount of time. It [Rumours] didn't cost so much because we were in a cheaper studio. There's no denying what it cost, but I think it's been taken out of context."

== Artwork ==
Rather than solicit the services of Herbert W. Worthington, who created the cover art for Rumours and the 1975 self-titled album, the band opted to select three photographers from different disciplines to design the album sleeve for Tusk. Larry Vigon, who served as the album's designer, reached out to Peter Beard after seeing some of his artwork in one of his journals, which included sundry items such as feathers, dried leaves, and newspaper headlines.

Beard, who specialised as a documentary photographer, was enlisted by Vigon to supply images for the album sleeve and spent two weeks in the recording studio taking Polaroids of the band and its inner circle. He also augmented this footage with images of elephant tusks. During one of those sessions, Beard took a photo of Caillat's dog Scooter biting his leg, which ultimately became the cover art for Tusk. Fleetwood had originally promised Nicks that the cover art would feature an image of her twirling and dancing; Nicks later told Caillat that she placed a curse on his dog for "stealing her cover". Beard also incorporated several images of Scooter throughout the album's collages that he created, including one with a cropped photo of Scooter's head imposed onto the body of a naked woman. According to Dashut, Beard bled onto some of the collage by cutting his hand with a razor blade.

The liner notes contained group shots of the band taken by Norman Seeff, with one of those images featuring a moonlit gazebo in the background. Seeff recounted that he encountered some difficulties in assembling all five members into one location.

It was like being a sort of a school teacher in the kindergarten because everyone was having their own wonderful time...Each of them was individually fascinating, but together you could feel an electricity between everyone. And I'm working with all the stories of what was going on with them. It was magic, because rather than being five separate people they became one.

Jayme Odgers was responsible for creating the upside-down photograph found in the booklet, which featured Fleetwood clinging to a chair on the ceiling, Buckingham and Nicks suspended in the air, and both McVies firmly planted on the ground. When Odgers proposed the idea, the band was uncooperative and refused to be in the same room together, so Odgers instead took photographs of the band individually in different poses. Odgers pieced together the separate shots into a more cohesive photograph and credited the band's obstinance for achieving the final product. "Unbeknownst to them, my photographic forte was putting separate images together seamlessly, so I pushed on. Had they all been willing to be photographed together, the image never would have looked like it does."

The photo taken by Odgers served as a point of contention for Warner Bros, who opposed its inclusion in the booklet. According to Odgers, Fleetwood informed him that the band spent two hours discussing the fate of the image; Fleetwood ultimately convinced Warner Bros to keep the image on the grounds that it would potentially elicit further discussion among the public. In 2016, a black-and-white version of Odger's photo was used as the front cover of the Alternate Tusk album, a collection issued by Rhino Records consisting of alternate takes and live recordings.

== Title ==
Varying accounts have been provided by Fleetwood Mac and their production team of naming the album Tusk. In Fleetwood's first memoir, he said that the title was in reference to male genitalia and claimed that Nicks threatened to quit the band after learning about the origin of the name. Nicks commented that "there was nothing beautiful or elegant about the word 'tusk'. All it really brought to mind was people stealing ivory. Even then, in 1979, you just thought about rhinos being poached, tusks being stolen, elephants being slaughtered and ivory being sold on the black market." She said that she "liked the title even less" when she was told about the meaning of the title and mentioned that the studio's mixing console was nicknamed "Tusk" due to the fake tusks that were mounted on the device.

Caillat said the band "thought that the tusk was a sign of male prowess" and remembered hearing the male members of the band making tusk jokes during the recording sessions. Richard Dashut, who co-produced the album, recalled that the band occasionally made phallic jokes, although he said that the title was instead attributed to the album's artwork in the liner notes.

I'm not sure if any of us knew what it meant. It became more of a cause of the elephants. Mick also brought in his tusks from his cast. They weren't real, but they were full-size elephant tusks that were mounted. What I'm fairly certain of is that it didn't come from the dick meaning. Maybe Mick would dispute me.

Larry Vigon, who designed the album, credited the title to Peter Beard's affinity for wildlife and African art. He said that the band settled on the name Tusk after Beard incorporated elephant references into the album artwork. Beard commented that "the album was named Tusk because of all my photographs with tusks in them." Buckingham said that tusk was a "nice sounding word" and that "there's no specific hidden meaning behind it."

== Release ==
Tusk was one of the first albums to be digitally mixed, having occurred the same year as Ry Cooder's album Bop Till You Drop. Caillat remembered that their efforts of digitally mixing the album were marred by issues related to unwanted surface noise due to issues with the vinyl pressing process. Similar issues occurred when the initial batch of singles for the title track were recalled by Warner Bros in September due a scratch on the vinyl's B-side. Caillat commented that "after Tusk came out, we had a meeting, of literally all the vinyl manufacturers. We had [them] all come in and actually tell us why there were so many problems". According to Caillat, they generally attributed these issues to industry changes on how the vinyl formula was made. Cashbox reported that the number of initial copies pressed and shipped for Tusk had exceeded Rumours.

An advertisement campaign was arranged by Warner Bros Records that utilised aspects of the album package, including the polaroid photo of the dog and italicised font found on the cover, and Seef's photo found in the inner sleeve. The company also developed what Rolling Stone described as "a motorized floor display that features a silk-screened image of the dog". The company originally outsourced the promotion responsibility to New York advertising agency Lord, Geller, Federico and Einstein to develop the album's marketing strategy, although Fleetwood Mac balked at the idea over the belief that "they were being sold like a product - like chewing gum."

I would have liked to have been a fly on the wall when Warner Bros. put that on in their boardroom and listened to it for the first time.

— Lindsey Buckingham

The album was scheduled for release on 12 October 1979 in the United States and 19 October in the United Kingdom. To counter the circulation of comparatively poor quality tape recordings of Tusk, Warner Bros distributed the album to retail record stores one week earlier than planned, with the first shipments beginning during the weekend of 5 October.

According to Russ Thyret, who at the time served as an executive for Warner Bros. Records, staffers at the company worked three double shifts to press enough copies for the promotional personnel. They subsequently hand-delivered Tusk to "as many radio stations as possible" ahead of the album's release date. The RKO radio chain obtained access to Tusk and prematurely played the album in its entirety on several of its radio stations across the United States. Warner Bros secured an injunction against RKO, which prevented the company from playing the album on its stations. They also barred RKO from claiming exclusive access to the album and requested that the radio chain refrain from disposing any of their copies with the intended goal of tracking down the source of the leak. Thyret stated his intention of identifying the leaker and prosecuting them "to the fullest extent of the law".

As part of a proclamation from the Los Angeles mayor Tom Bradley declaring 10 October as "Fleetwood Mac Day", members of the USC Trojan Marching Band opened the event with a rendition of the title track, which at that point had already been released as the album's lead single. The band also received a star on the Hollywood Walk of Fame and had the album played for 600 guests at a private party.

Fleetwood called Tusk his second favourite Fleetwood Mac studio album behind Then Play On. Christine McVie reflected that the band was apprehensive about clashing with Buckingham over the creative direction of Tusk and expressed mixed feelings about the final product, saying "sometimes I love it, sometimes I simply hate it. Bassist John McVie thought that the album "sounds like the work of three solo artists"; Buckingham told Classic Rock magazine that "you got that sweetness [from Nicks and McVie] and me as the complete nutcase. That's what makes us Fleetwood Mac."

Reflecting on the album in 1997, Nicks said that she was ambivalent on Tusk during the time of its recording, but had since warmed up to the record. She explained that she initially struggled to connect with the material, saying that "it was a lot of music to be stuck with for 13 months and to listen to over and over again...now I can listen to it and I really enjoy each song, but when I was there it was a one big rumpled up ball of Tusk-ness. So for me, it was way ahead of its time."

The album was remade in its entirety by American alternative rock band Camper Van Beethoven and released in 2003. Buckingham expressed his approval of the cover album, saying that the band "took some of the songs to such different places."

== Commercial performance ==
Tusk peaked at number four on the Billboard 200 in the United States and spent almost nine months on the chart. It was certified double platinum for shipping two million copies. It peaked at number one in the UK and achieved a platinum award for shipments in excess of 300,000 copies. The album gave the group two US top-10 hit singles, with the Buckingham-penned title track (US number eight/UK number six), and the Stevie Nicks composition "Sara" (US number seven/UK number 37).

Further releases from the album "Not That Funny" (UK-only single release), "Think About Me", and "Sisters of the Moon" were slightly remixed for radio, and were less successful. The latter two appear in their 'single versions' on the 2002 compilation The Very Best of Fleetwood Mac, while "Sara", which was cut to 4 1/2 minutes for both the single and the first CD release of the album, appears in its unedited form on the 1988 Greatest Hits compilation, the 2002 release The Very Best of Fleetwood Mac, and the 2004 reissue of Tusk.

Though the album sold four million copies worldwide, and earned a Grammy nomination in 1981 for its art design in the category "Best Album Package", the band's record label deemed the project a failure, laying the blame squarely with Buckingham (considering the comparatively huge sales of Rumours and the album's unprecedented recording expense). Fleetwood, however, blames the album's relative failure on the RKO radio chain playing the album in its entirety prior to release, thus allowing mass home recording. In addition, Tusk was a double album, with a high list price of US$16.00, or $71 in 2025 terms. The band originally considered the idea of releasing Tusk as two single albums each with the price of $7.98, but the record label decided against this.

== Critical reception ==
Retrospective professional ratings
Review scores
Source	Rating
AllMusic	5/5 stars
Blender	3/5 stars
Christgau's Record Guide	B+
Entertainment Weekly	B+
Mojo	4/5 stars
Pitchfork	9.2/10
Record Collector	4/5 stars
Rolling Stone	4.5/5 stars
The Rolling Stone Album Guide	4/5 stars
Uncut	5/5 stars

In his review for Rolling Stone, Stephen Holden emphasised the experimental nature of the album, comparing it to the Beatles' "White Album" in that "Tusk is less a collection of finished songs than a mosaic of pop-rock fragments by individual performers." Robert Christgau of The Village Voice was more ambivalent, lauding Buckingham's production and experimentation, while dismissing Christine McVie's and Stevie Nicks's contributions. Music Week thought that the album "did not have the same impact" as Rumours.

Cashbox characterised Tusk as the band's "most adventuresome LP to date" and posited that it would take "six months before people really realize what a creative masterpiece the two-LP set is." Record World called Tusk "a highly progressive disc that takes more than one listen to digest." Reviewing the album for Billboard, Ed Harrison thought there was sufficient material on Tusk to classify it as "an artistically successful venture". He also believed that Tusk would have been "an incredible follow-up to Rumours" if it was condensed from a double album to a single disc. In a different review from Billboard written one week prior to Harrison's writeup, the publication said that some tracks on Tusk "sound as if they were culled right off the 'Rumours' LP."

Retrospectively, AllMusic's Stephen Thomas Erlewine found the album to be timeless, calling it "a peerless piece of pop art" that rivals the more accessible Rumours album in terms of quality. Amanda Petrusich of Pitchfork found the album "self-indulgent" and "terrifically strange". Clark Collis of Blender felt that the album lacked enough quality material to justify a 2-disc collection. Kris Needs wrote in Record Collector that McVie's tracks "have best stood the test of time" and felt that they bore the closest resemblance to the band's work on Rumours. Retrospective reviews noted the stark contrast between the album's lush opening track, "Over & Over", and the production of the following track, "The Ledge".

== Track listing ==
=== Record one ===
Side one
No.	Title	Writer(s)	Lead vocals	Length
1.	"Over & Over"	Christine McVie	C. McVie	4:35
2.	"The Ledge"	Lindsey Buckingham	Buckingham	2:02
3.	"Think About Me"	C. McVie	C. McVie with Buckingham	2:44
4.	"Save Me a Place"	Buckingham	Buckingham	2:40
5.	"Sara"	Stevie Nicks	Nicks	6:26

Side two
No.	Title	Writer(s)	Lead vocals	Length
1.	"What Makes You Think You're the One"	Buckingham	Buckingham	3:28
2.	"Storms"	Nicks	Nicks	5:28
3.	"That's All for Everyone"	Buckingham	Buckingham	3:04
4.	"Not That Funny"	Buckingham	Buckingham	3:19
5.	"Sisters of the Moon"	Nicks	Nicks	4:36
Total length:				38:22

=== Record two ===
Side three
No.	Title	Writer(s)	Lead vocals	Length
1.	"Angel"	Nicks	Nicks	4:53
2.	"That's Enough for Me"	Buckingham	Buckingham	1:48
3.	"Brown Eyes"	C. McVie	C. McVie	4:27
4.	"Never Make Me Cry"	C. McVie	C. McVie	2:14
5.	"I Know I'm Not Wrong"	Buckingham	Buckingham	2:59

Side four
No.	Title	Writer(s)	Lead vocals	Length
1.	"Honey Hi"	C. McVie	C. McVie	2:43
2.	"Beautiful Child"	Nicks	Nicks	5:19
3.	"Walk a Thin Line"	Buckingham	Buckingham	3:44
4.	"Tusk"	Buckingham	Buckingham with C. McVie	3:36
5.	"Never Forget"	C. McVie	C. McVie	3:40
Total length:				35:23

Notes:

- On earlier CD pressings, "Sara" is edited to 4:39.
- The CD mixes of "Not That Funny" and "I Know I'm Not Wrong" differ from their LP mixes.

== Personnel ==
Fleetwood Mac

- Lindsey Buckingham – vocals, guitars, bass guitar, keyboards, drums, percussion, charango, kalimba
- Stevie Nicks – vocals, tack piano (on "Sara" doubled with Christine McVie's piano)
- Christine McVie – vocals, keyboards
- John McVie – bass guitar
- Mick Fleetwood – drums, percussion

Additional musicians

- Peter Green – guitar (on "Brown Eyes")
- USC Trojan Marching Band – horns and percussion (on "Tusk")

Production

- Fleetwood Mac – producers
- Richard Dashut; Ken Caillat – producers, engineers
- Lindsey Buckingham – engineer
- Hernán Rojas – assistant engineer, additional engineering, tape transfers
- Rich Feldman – assistant engineer (with digital mix-down equipment)
- Ken Perry – mastering (at Capitol Records)
- Greg Thomason; Raymond Lindsey; Patrick Byrne – studio crew
- Larry Vigon – art direction, design
- Peter Beard; Jayme Odgers; Norman Seeff – photography

== Charts ==
=== Weekly charts ===
1979–1980 weekly chart performance for Tusk
Chart (1979–1980)	Peak position
Australia Albums (Kent Music Report)	2
Austrian Albums (Ö3 Austria)	4
Canada Top Albums/CDs (RPM)	11
French Albums (SNEP)	3
Dutch Albums (Album Top 100)	3
German Albums (Offizielle Top 100)	3
Japanese Albums (Oricon)	27
New Zealand Albums (RMNZ)	1
Norwegian Albums (VG-lista)	6
Spanish Albums (AFYVE)	18
Swedish Albums (Sverigetopplistan)	8
UK Albums (Official Charts)	1
US Billboard 200	4
US Cash Box Top 200 Albums	2

2004 weekly chart performance for Tusk
Chart (2004)	Peak position
US Top Catalog Albums (Billboard)	30

2015–2016 weekly chart performance for Tusk (2015 reissue)
Chart (2015–2016)	Peak position
Belgian Albums (Ultratop Flanders)	148
Dutch Albums (Album Top 100)	86
Irish Albums (IRMA)	62
UK Albums (Official Charts)	82
US Indie Store Album Sales (Billboard)	14

2021 weekly chart performance for Tusk
Chart (2021)	Peak position
Hungarian Albums (MAHASZ)	27

=== Year-end charts ===
1979 year-end chart performance for Tusk
Chart (1979)	Position
Australian Albums (Kent Music Report)	42
Canada Top Albums/CDs (RPM)	69
New Zealand Albums (RMNZ)	42
UK Albums (BMRB)	25
US Cash Box Top 200 Albums	33

1980 year-end chart performance for Tusk
Chart (1980)	Position
Australian Albums (Kent Music Report)	17
Canada Top Albums/CDs (RPM)	70
Dutch Albums (Album Top 100)	65
German Albums (Offizielle Top 100)	14
New Zealand Albums (RMNZ)	19
US Billboard 200	20
US Cash Box Top 200 Albums	37

== Certifications ==
Certifications for Tusk
Region	Certification	Certified units/sales
Australia (ARIA)	3× Platinum	150,000^{^}
France (SNEP)	Gold	100,000^{*}
Germany (BVMI)	Gold	300,000
Netherlands (NVPI)	Platinum	100,000^{^}
New Zealand (RMNZ)	Platinum	15,000^{^}
United Kingdom (BPI)	Platinum	300,000^{^}
United States (RIAA)	2× Platinum	2,000,000^{^}
Summaries
Worldwide	—	4,000,000
^{*} Sales figures based on certification alone.^{^} Shipments figures based on certification alone.

== See also ==
- Album era
