= The Buckeye Politicians =

- Origin: United States
- Genres: Rock, Funk

The Buckeye Politicians were a funk rock band that released some recordings in the 1970s.

== History ==
The group formed in the very early 1970s by three brothers who once called themselves "The Vondors." They recorded a single for Bill Moss' Holiday records. Side A was a vocal track while the B side was instrumental. Through Moss' connections with Bell Records, two more singles were released on the Bell label. They changed their name to The Soul Partners and scored a local hit.

They changed their name in the 1970s to The Buckeye Politicians and released a single on Sceptor Records.

Later, the band traveled to England and recorded under the direction of Alan Parsons, producing one single. An album worth of material from the Alan Parsons sessions was recorded. However, the album was never released because the tapes were lost by the airline on their return to the United States.

They released a single and an album on Utopia records. They released a few more singles in the 1980s.

As part of a 2006 reunion they recorded a CD called Here I Am.

Original member Larry "LA" Almon died in 2008.

== Members ==
=== Original ===
- LA (Larry) Almon - Lead and Rhythm Guitar, Vocals
- Jay Almon - Bass Guitar: Vocals
- Roscoe Almon - Guitar, Lead and vocals
- Bobby Marsillio - Trumpet
- Buzzard - Drums
- Dog - Trombone, keyboards & flute

=== Current ===
- LA Almon - Lead and Rhythm Guitar, Vocals
- Jay Almon - Bass Guitar: Vocals
- Conia (sonya with a C) Almon - Vocals: (Jay Almon's daughter)
- Tharon Johnson - Keyboards
- David Nilo - Keyboards
- Mark Henderson - Percussion
- Kris Keith - Tenor and Soprano Saxophone, Flute

== US discography ==
=== 7" singles ===
- "Girl I Could Love You More" / "I Wish It Would Rain" - Scepter Records SCE-12301 - 1970
- "Dreams" / "Sister Rose" - EMI 2134 - 1974

=== 12" singles ===
- "Ride On The Rhythm" / "Ride On The Rhythm" (Instrumental) - Macola Record Co – MRC-0946
- "Skin Tight" (Radio Edit), "Skin Tight" (Extended Mix) / "Skin Tight" (Long Instrumental

=== LP ===
- Look At Me Now - Utopia BUL1-1823 - 1976
