= Think About Me =

Single by Fleetwood Mac

from the album Tusk
- B-side: "Save Me a Place" (US) "Honey Hi" (UK)
- Released: March 1980 (US); 16 May 1980 (UK)
- Recorded: 1979
- Genre: Rock; boogie rock; pop rock
- Length: 2:44
- Label: Warner Bros.
- Songwriter: Christine McVie

Fleetwood Mac singles chronology
"Not That Funny" (1980)	"Think About Me" (1980)	"Sisters of the Moon" (1980)

"Think About Me" is a song by British-American rock band Fleetwood Mac, released in 1979 on the album Tusk. It was also issued as a single in the US in March 1980. The song was composed by Fleetwood Mac keyboardist Christine McVie. "Think About Me" was slightly remixed for single release.

The song peaked at number 20 on the US Billboard Hot 100 singles chart and number 24 on Canada's RPM Top 100 Singles chart. Even though "Think About Me" was a top 20 hit, it was not included in the 1988 album Greatest Hits although it did appear on the 2002 compilation album The Very Best of Fleetwood Mac. Fleetwood Mac played the song live for the first time in 35 years during their Australian leg of the "On with the Show tour" in Sydney.

Canadian indie rock band The New Pornographers recorded a cover version of the song for the 2012 compilation album Just Tell Me That You Want Me: A Tribute to Fleetwood Mac. The version features backward-sounding guitars and Carl Newman on lead vocals.

== Recording ==
Fleetwood Mac began the tracking of "Think About Me" in February 1979. For the original run-through, Mick Fleetwood's drum kit was placed in the center with bassist John McVie right next to him. Christine McVie played a Yamaha electric piano in the control room, while Lindsey Buckingham was positioned in front of the control room glass. Buckingham and John McVie had their amplifiers situated in isolation booths, leaving Fleetwood's drums as the only live sound emerging from the studio room. As such, two AKG 414 microphones were placed throughout the studio to capture the room ambiance. Four takes were recorded over the course of four hours, with the second being deemed satisfactory.

Hernan Rojas, who served as an audio engineer for the Tusk album, recalled that co-producers Ken Caillat and Richard Dashut were diligent in tuning and equalizing Fleetwood's drum kit before the recording session for "Think About Me"; they were also successful in providing a suitable headphone mix to the band members before they lost interest in playing. "When we took hours testing drum kits, tuning the snare or toms, varying microphone positions, and dawdling over the infinite selection of guitars and pianos...everyone would call it quits and agree to continue the next day. This is why "Think About Me" felt wonderful – spontaneous even. In a mere afternoon, the band and crew were running the song down with perfect feel, groove, and sound."

Once the basic tracking was complete, the band overdubbed an acoustic piano to accent certain musical passages, a Moog synthesizer to double the bass and accentuate some of the lower frequencies, lead guitar, and backing vocals during the final lines of the verses and the outro. The band experimented with a Chamberlin, twelve-string guitars, and a pump organ during the song's instrumental bridge, although they ultimately settled on an electric guitar solo played on a Fender Stratocaster. The song was sung as a duet between Buckingham and Christine McVie, with Nicks providing additional vocal harmonies. McVie sang her parts through an Electro-Voice RE20 microphone at her electric piano; Buckingham was positioned a few yards away using a Shure SM57 microphone.

== Reception ==
In 1979, Ed Harrison of Billboard called the song "a more rocking, guitar punctuated tune backed with superb harmonies" and complimented McVie's songwriting. Cash Box said it has a "light and bouncy melody" with "some gritty guitar and pounding keyboard work" to "balance the feathery harmonies." Record World said that "Christine McVie contributes one of her made-for-radio jewels with the irresistible melody & rich vocal harmonies backed by an incessant rhythm track." Steve Morse of The Boston Globe gave the single a positive review, calling "predictably bouncy".

In 2003, Rob Brunner of Entertainment Weekly gave the Tusk album a positive review, noting that it was a "must" and "fascinating mess, full of enough good songs", "Think About Me" included. Alfred Soto of PopMatters described the song as "the unlikeliest of things: a McVie rocker" in a 2010 review. Soto called it "a near-perfect punk number that snuck in below the radar" and that it was "anchored by her electric piano, Buckingham's fuzzed-up 'Day Tripper'-esque riff," and "the most sarcastic lyrics of McVie's career," referring to the couplet, "I don't hold you down/Maybe that's why you're around." Mike Mettler of Sound & Vision discussed the 5.1 surround sound mix of "Think About Me" found on the deluxe edition of Tusk, saying that the "patented Mac harmonies" helped to enhance the song's choruses.

== Personnel ==
- Christine McVie – lead vocals, keyboards
- Lindsey Buckingham – guitars, co-lead vocals
- Stevie Nicks – backing vocals
- John McVie – bass guitar
- Mick Fleetwood – drums

== Charts ==
Chart (1980)	Peak position
Canadian Singles Chart (RPM)	24
US Billboard Hot 100	20
US Billboard Adult Contemporary	39
US Cash Box Top 100	22
US Pop/Adult Airplay (Radio & Records)	24
US Contemporary Hit Radio (Radio & Records)	9
US Record World Singles	17
