= That's All for Everyone =

Song by British-American rock band Fleetwood Mac, released in 1979

Song by Fleetwood Mac

from the album Tusk
- Released: 1979
- Recorded: 1978–1979
- Genre: Rock
- Length: 3:03
- Label: Warner Bros.
- Songwriter: Lindsey Buckingham
- Producers: Fleetwood Mac; Richard Dashut; Ken Caillat

"That's All for Everyone" is a song by British-American rock band Fleetwood Mac, released in 1979. Composed and sung by guitarist Lindsey Buckingham, it was one of his nine songs that appeared on the Tusk album. The song was also included on Fleetwood Mac's 1992 box set, 25 Years – The Chain.

== Background ==
"That's All for Everyone" began as an instrumental composition under the working title "Lindsey's Song #2" and was referred to as such for several months until the lyrics were finalized. Initial tracking was done with Mick Fleetwood on drums, John McVie on bass guitar, Christine McVie on electric piano, and Buckingham on electric guitar. Buckingham's scratch vocal originally did not include the title hook, although once it did, he entirely reworked the lyrics. A demo consisting of alternate lyrics was included on the 2015 super deluxe edition of Tusk. The song's final lyrics are a composite of ideas conceived by Buckingham, one of which pertained to people attending a function and being asked to go home. He also suggested that the lyrics were about rejecting "what the corporate world is trying to sell you". The "must be just exactly what I need" part was added to provide a sense of anticipation before the chord progression returned to the tonic.

The initial attempts to record the song were unsuccessful, so the band occasionally returned to the song throughout the duration of the Tusk sessions. None of the instrumentation from the original recording session was retained in the final mix. Christine McVie's piano playing was stripped down to block chords and John McVie's bass guitar was brought down in volume. Fleetwood recorded individual parts on a kick drum and snare drum and overdubbed some hand percussion. Cymbals and tom-toms were also recorded, although Buckingham instructed Fleetwood to scrap these parts. Buckingham overdubbed his own piano and bass parts and also played along to Fleetwood's drum track using a kick drum, snare drum, and a Kleenex box, the latter of which was heavily compressed.

As a Christmas gift, engineer Hernan Rojas gave Buckingham a charango, an instrument from the Andes with triple coursed strings and an armadillo shell on the back. Buckingham retuned the charango and layered it over high-string guitars recorded at low speed and later sped up. These instruments were doubled and tripled in some cases to attain a wall of sound. Buckingham also recorded some volume swells on a Fender Stratocaster guitar to provide support for the acoustic guitars.

Buckingham played a descending motif on a kalimba that he tuned himself and also doubled the part on a guitar. Caillat noted that Buckingham was on the lookout for unconventional instruments, and that the charango and kalimba both fulfilled this criterion. For the song's climax, Buckingham opted to end the song with wordless harmonized vocalizations as opposed to a guitar solo. His lead vocals were also tripled and drenched with reverb, which at the time was a rare practice for him.

Author Domenic Priore noted that some of the production elements on "That's All for Everyone" were the byproduct of Buckingham accessing the recordings for Smile, an unfinished album by The Beach Boys. Buckingham himself acknowledged that the song was influenced by the work of Brian Wilson, who inspired him to "take risks and find new avenues" as a musician and arranger.

== Critical reception ==
Music critics generally deemed "That's All for Everyone" as one of Buckingham's most accessible recordings on Tusk. Rolling Stone described the song as a "chiming folk ballad" that was amongst Buckingham's most commercial efforts. Billboard echoed these sentiments, adding that the song's "melodic undercoating and harmonies" created an "instantaneous grabbing effect on the listener." Kris Needs of Record Collector wrote that the song "is reminiscent of the kind of lush, frazzled track that Brian Wilson would contribute to early 70s Beach Boys albums." Richie Unterberger said that the song comes across as a "tripped-out psychedelic ballad with Caribbean overtones". Ultimate Classic Rock deemed "That's All for Everyone" as the most overlooked song on Tusk, saying that "the spaced out" song "echoes the lush pop of acts such as 10cc and the Beach Boys."

== Legacy ==
"That's All for Everyone" was covered by Tame Impala for the 2012 compilation album Just Tell Me That You Want Me: A Tribute to Fleetwood Mac.

== Personnel ==
- Lindsey Buckingham – lead and backing vocals, electric guitars, charango, kalimba, additional bass guitar, piano, drums, and percussion
- Mick Fleetwood – drums, percussion
- John McVie – bass guitar
- Christine McVie – piano, backing vocals
- Stevie Nicks – backing vocals
