= Brown Eyes (song) =

Song by Fleetwood Mac

from the album Tusk
- Released: 19 September 1979
- Recorded: 1978–79
- Genre: Soft rock, blues rock
- Length: 4.27
- Label: Warner Bros.
- Songwriter(s): Christine McVie
- Producer(s): Fleetwood Mac, Richard Dashut, Ken Caillat

"Brown Eyes" is a song by Fleetwood Mac from the 1979 double LP Tusk. It was one of six songs from the album composed and sung by Christine McVie and also includes uncredited playing from Peter Green, who was a founding member of Fleetwood Mac.

"Brown Eyes" was first performed on the Mirage Tour in 1982 and was later included on 1987–1988 Shake the Cage Tour. A live performance of "Brown Eyes" from one of the band's October 1982 performances at The Forum in Inglewood, California was included on the 2021 deluxe edition of the band's Live album and their 2024 Mirage Tour '82.

== Background ==
"Brown Eyes" is the first song that McVie presented to the group for the Tusk album, having done so in April 1978 at a band rehearsal on Mulholland Drive. The song's structure consisted of three chords across two verses and a wordless chorus. McVie originally claimed that the song was about her dog, although she later confided in Ken Caillat that the song was about Dennis Wilson, who actually had green eyes.

During the song's initial tracking, Mick Fleetwood played a full drum kit and employed rim clicks on his snare drum, Lindsey Buckingham used his white Alembic electric guitar through a volume pedal, Christine McVie played a Yamaha electric piano, and John McVie played a bass guitar through an amplifier as opposed to the band's usual method of sending the bass directly to the mixing console. The backing vocals were not conducted until October 11th, so Stevie Nicks instead danced in the control room as the rest of the band recorded their parts. Additional vocal overdubs were recorded in early December.

Caillat characterized "Brown Eyes" as "a simple song with lots of space that made huge demands on the rhythm section and the melody instruments to fill it with color and ambiance." The band ultimately completed 37 takes before settling on their master recording. During the recording process, Dennis Wilson was present in the control room and provided opinions on how to approach the song, although several people, including Fleetwood and John McVie, dismissed these ideas.

=== Involvement of Peter Green ===
Peter Green, a founding member of the band, also took part in the sessions for "Brown Eyes", but his guitar playing on the track is not credited on the original album release. Mick Fleetwood, the band's drummer, remembered that Green still remained in contact with the band and occasionally joined them in the studio. At Fleetwood's request, Green overdubbed electric guitar on "Brown Eyes", although his playing was only included on the fade-out for the official release. The full recording session, dated 20 September 1979, appears on disc three of the 2015 deluxe edition of Tusk, which contains alternate recordings of the album's 20 tracks. This version has McVie singing different lyrics to those on the original album.

In a 1999 interview with The Penguin, Green said that he had no recollection of the recording session, which he attributed to his deteriorating health in the 1970s, but said there was still a possibility that he played on it. Buckingham also did not recall the sessions taking place. "I don’t remember Peter Green coming in, so I don’t think I made any judgment on whether to use [his part] or not. Mick would ultimately have had the decision to use his playing or not. And it was Christine's song to do with as she wished." He also expressed his belief that Fleetwood would have credited Green in the liner notes if he had contributed to the song. However, Caillat recalled in his 2019 book, Get Tusked, that Buckingham was displeased with Green's blues guitar licks, so his parts were muted except for the outro.

== Personnel ==
- Mick Fleetwood – drums, tambourine
- John McVie – bass guitar
- Christine McVie – keyboards, lead and backing vocals
- Lindsey Buckingham – guitar, backing vocals
- Stevie Nicks – backing vocals
- Peter Green – guitar
