= Storms (Fleetwood Mac song) =

Song by British-American rock band Fleetwood Mac, released in 1979

Song by Fleetwood Mac

from the album Tusk
- Released: 1979
- Recorded: 1978–1979
- Genre: Soft rock
- Length: 5:31
- Label: Warner Bros.
- Songwriter: Stevie Nicks
- Producers: Fleetwood Mac, Richard Dashut, Ken Caillat

"Storms" is a song by British-American rock band Fleetwood Mac, released in 1979. Composed and sung by vocalist Stevie Nicks, it was one of her five songs that appeared on the Tusk album. The song was also included on the US 2002 and UK 2009 editions of The Very Best of Fleetwood Mac as the final track on disc one. An alternate mix with more stripped back production was included on the 2015 deluxe edition of Tusk. Nicks said that the song was about her affair with bandmate Mick Fleetwood, which she believed contributed to the dissolution of his marriage with Jenny Boyd.

== Background ==
"Storms" was the first song that Nicks presented to Fleetwood Mac for the Tusk album. In its demo form, the song only consisted of vocals and a rough piano part played by Nicks. Carol Ann Harris recalled that her former boyfriend, Lindsey Buckingham, was critical of "Storms" when Nicks played her demo to the band, which led to an argument between Nicks and Buckingham. Producer Ken Caillat described the demo as "a somewhat depressing song with only a few chords". However, when the band revisited "Storms" in autumn 1978, both Caillat and engineer Hernán Rojas were surprised at Buckingham's willingness to dedicate his efforts toward the song. Buckingham later expressed his approval of "Storms" in 2015, calling it "a very strong song in terms of its form". He also called "Storms" one of his favorite songs on the album and believed that the song's lyrics were particularly vulnerable.

The band worked on "Storms" the day after a recording session for "That's All for Everyone", a Buckingham composition. While the other members of Fleetwood Mac were tracking "That's All For Everyone", Nicks grew bored and insisted during dinner that the band record "Storms" the following day, which they agreed to. Rojas remembered that Nicks felt excessively criticized by the band when she asked to record one of her own songs. "It wasn't that Stevie's songs weren't good, just that they presented more of a challenge, not only to arrange the song structure, but also to give it a brighter mood."

Buckingham remembered that the intention was to create a stripped back arrangement for "Storms" and believed that the song would have come across as a country song if the band approached the song "in a conventional way". He described the final mix of "Storms" as the equivalent of a "tactile experience". For the initial tracking of "Storms", Buckingham strummed an acoustic guitar over a click track, although he later replaced that part with a fingerpicked nylon-string guitar and two arpeggiated electric guitars: one recorded clean and another distorted. Christine McVie played a Hammond B-3 organ through a rotating Leslie speaker and also overdubbed a Fender Rhodes electric piano to supplement Buckingham's guitars and John McVie's acoustic bass guitar. Fleetwood originally played a reverbed snare drum and shaker on the downbeats, although this was replaced with a tambourine and a muted floor tom. The producers also used equalization to transform the click track into a kick drum.

Nicks confirmed that "Storms" related to the fallout of her affair with Fleetwood. "It was really about Mick...That relationship destroyed Mick's marriage to Jenny, who was the sweetest person in the world...Here’s that song in a nutshell: Don't break up other people's marriages. It will never work and will haunt you for the rest of your miserable days."

== Critical reception ==
Rolling Stone called "Storms" a "lovely ballad", but said that "the production goes too far, and the track quivers with an eerie electronic vibrato". Robert Kilburn of The Los Angeles Times characterised the song as an "affecting look at romantic discomfort." Writing for Billboard, Ed Harrison identified "Storms" as one of the most memorable songs on Tusk.

Contemporary reviews of the song have been positive. GQ labeled "Storms" as one Fleetwood Mac's best post-Rumours songs and highlighted her "downtrodden" vocals. Record Collector thought that "Storms" was the "greatest ballad" written by Nicks. Paste ranked the song number nine its list of the 30 greatest Fleetwood Mac songs, writing that "there’s something particularly waxing and enchanting about "Storms," especially as the band's gorgeous, melodic and dreamy backing instrumentation bubbles behind her [Nicks's] confident and worn-in vocals."

== Personnel ==
- Stevie Nicks – lead vocals
- Lindsey Buckingham – guitars, backing vocals
- Christine McVie – keyboards, backing vocals
- John McVie – bass guitar
- Mick Fleetwood – tambourine, floor tom
