= Sisters of the Moon =

Single by Fleetwood Mac

from the album Tusk
- B-side: "Walk a Thin Line"
- Released: June 1980
- Recorded: 1978–1979
- Genre: Rock, hard rock
- Length: 4:16 (Promo Version); 4:36 (Album Version); 4:42 (Single Version)
- Label: Warner Bros.
- Songwriter: Stevie Nicks
- Producers: Fleetwood Mac, Richard Dashut, Ken Caillat

Fleetwood Mac singles chronology
"Think About Me" (1980)	"Sisters of the Moon" (1980)	"Fireflies" (1981)

"Sisters of the Moon" is a song by British-American rock group Fleetwood Mac. It was written and sung by band-member Stevie Nicks and was released in the US as the fourth single from the 1979 album Tusk. The song peaked at No. 86 on the Billboard Hot 100 and was not released in the UK. "Sisters of the Moon" broke the band's ten-song streak of top twenty singles in the US, which began with "Over My Head". The single version of "Sisters of the Moon" is included on the compilation The Very Best of Fleetwood Mac and both the 2004 and 2015 remasters of 'Tusk'.

When performed live, the song would usually go for over eight minutes in length, most notably the Mirage Tour version in 1982. The song did not appear on any subsequent tour until their 2013 Tour, making it the first time Fleetwood Mac performed it live in roughly 30 years. "Sisters of the Moon" was also played on the North American and European legs of the On with the Show tour with an abbreviated guitar solo.

== Background ==
"Sisters of the Moon" was written a few years before the making of Tusk. Nicks said in an interview with Jim Ladd in the 1970s that the song was written about her deteriorating health while she was on tour with Fleetwood Mac. "I walked out in front of the mirror and looked at myself and I was sick...so [the lyric] intense silence as she walked in the room was me looking at myself. And the people they love her, that's after the gigs; they're a million people and you're being pulled every way."

In 1977, Nicks gave a demo of "Sisters of the Moon to Walter Egan, who said that he exchanged songs with Nicks on an occasional basis. Egan taught the song to his band and performed the song live in 1977 and 1978. Egan recorded a demo of the song and intended to include it on Not Shy, an album that Buckingham and Nicks had agreed to produce. During the sessions, Buckingham convinced him to leave "Sisters of the Moon" off the album. According to Egan, Buckingham's decision stemmed from personal issues with Nicks rather than the merits of the song. Egan eventually released a version, recorded in the mid-1980s, on the 2002 archival release Mad Dog - The Lost Album.

Starting in July 1978, Fleetwood Mac embarked on their Penguin Country Summer Safari Tour, where they included "Sister of the Moon" in the setlist, their only song from Tusk, which at that point was only a month in development. In a 1979 interview, Egan expressed his belief that Fleetwood Mac decided to record the song for Tusk based on "the strength of my demo version...at least that's what Stevie tells me."

Nicks said in an interview with NPR that "Sisters of the Moon" was about the difficulties associated with touring and being a rock star and added that the song presented her an opportunity to talk with her alter ego. In the liner notes for the 2015 deluxe edition of Tusk, Nicks described the song as her "putting up an alter-ego or something, the dark lady in the corner, and there's this Gemini twin-thing. It wasn't a love song; it wasn't written about a man, or anything precious. It was just about a feeling I might have had over a couple days, going inward in my gnarly trollness".

Ken Caillat, who produced the Tusk album, commented that the song "meant a great deal to Stevie" at the time and "represented an anthem of friendship for her sorority of girlfriends". Hernan Rojas, who served as the audio engineer for Tusk, recalled that Nicks dubbed her friend group of Sara Recor, Sharon Celani, and Robin Anderson as "members of the sisterhood", all of whom were bestowed golden half-moon pendants. The Los Angeles Times mentioned that Nicks had also given gold moon necklaces to Taylor Swift, members of the band Haim, and soldiers at Walter Reed Army Medical Center, saying that the recipients of these items were called Nicks' Sisters of the Moon and told to give these moon necklaces "to another in need, should the moment arise."

== Recording ==
Fleetwood Mac rehearsed the song in the summer, but returned to the song in October 1978 after the conclusion of their Penguin Country Summer Safari Tour. The band assembled for conference to determine which verses to retain from Nicks' demo, ultimately opting to record a six minute version. They also reserved the option to edit the song further if they felt it had "single potential".

For the October tracking session, Mick Fleetwood was on drum kit that included a 26-inch kick drum, John McVie used a Fender Precision Bass, Buckingham played a distorted Fender Stratocaster plugged into a Marshall stack, Nicks sang her parts in a stained-glass vocal booth, and Christine McVie used a Yamaha electric piano, having recently received an endorsement deal from the company. John McVie swapped out the Fender bass for his new Alembic soon after. After several hours, the band still lacked a satisfactory take, so they took a break to perform poetry, including Robert Frost's "Stopping by Woods on a Snowy Evening". During this break, members of the rhythm section convened in the control room to listen to the soloed kick drum and snare drum tracks to detect any deviations in the song's tempo. After dinner, the band decided to increase the song's tempo by two beats per minute and resumed work at take 30. They recorded seven more passes, eventually settling on take 35 as the master.

Nicks wanted the backing vocals to be all female, so she and Christine McVie recorded some harmonies during the original tracking sessions. These vocals, which Nicks belted in her head voice, were combined with additional vocals recorded at a later date. Over the next few months, Buckingham overdubbed two tracks of "electric volume swells" and reverbed arpeggio guitars, three tracks of "grungy" Stratocasters, and two acoustic guitars.

== Critical reception ==
Cashbox said that the song is "mysterious and marvelous" and particularly praised Lindsey Buckingham's guitar playing, saying that the "notes cry out like a banshee in the night." Record World characterised the song as a "bewitching tale with [a] dark, relenting rhythm" with a "haunting vocal-guitar mix" and predicted that the single would perform well on AOR formats and also receive airplay on pop radio. Billboard characterised it as a "haunting song" that "recalls the chilling sound of 'Rhiannon'". Rolling Stone ranked the song number 38 on its list of the 50 greatest Fleetwood Mac songs.

== Personnel ==
- Stevie Nicks – lead and backing vocals
- Christine McVie – keyboards, backing vocals
- Lindsey Buckingham – electric and acoustic guitars
- Mick Fleetwood – drums
- John McVie – bass guitar

== Charts ==
Chart (1980)	Peak position
US Billboard Hot 100	86
