= Sara (Fleetwood Mac song) =

1979 single by Fleetwood Mac

Single by Fleetwood Mac

from the album Tusk
- B-side: "That's Enough for Me"
- Released: 5 December 1979
- Recorded: 1978–1979
- Genre: Folk rock; soft rock
- Length: 6:22 (full album version); 4:37 (single edit)
- Label: Warner Bros.
- Songwriter: Stevie Nicks
- Producers: Fleetwood Mac; Richard Dashut; Ken Caillat

Fleetwood Mac singles chronology
"Tusk" (1979)	"Sara" (1979)	"Not That Funny" (1980)

Music video
- "Sara - Fleetwood Mac" on YouTube

"Sara" is a song written by singer-songwriter Stevie Nicks of the British-American rock band Fleetwood Mac, which was one of the five songs written by Nicks on the band's 1979 Tusk double LP. It was released in December 1979 as the second single from the album and peaked at No. 7 in the US for three weeks, No. 37 in the UK for two weeks, No. 11 in Australia, and No. 12 in Canada. Nicks drew references from various individuals in her life when she wrote "Sara", which originally consisted of a set of lyrics without any instrumentation. She demoed the song in the absence of the rest of Fleetwood Mac, who later reworked the song for the Tusk album. During its earliest stages, the song's run-time was roughly 16 minutes and was edited down over the span of the Tusk sessions.

Since its release, "Sara" has been included on several Fleetwood Mac compilations, including Greatest Hits, The Very Best of Fleetwood Mac, and 50 Years – Don't Stop. Nicks has also performed the song live on numerous occasions both as a solo artist and as a member of Fleetwood Mac.

== Origin ==
"Sara" was originally conceived as a poem without any music attached to it; Nicks later came up with a chord progression and melody to accompany it. She told Hernán Rojas, an audio engineer for the Tusk album, that she developed the lyrics and melody while doing ballet with a Russian teacher with Jean-Michel Jarre's Oxygène playing in the background.

Speaking in a radio interview for the Friday Rock Show with Tommy Vance in the early 1990s, Stevie Nicks said the song was partially written about her friend, Sara Recor, who later married Nicks' ex-lover and bandmate, Mick Fleetwood.

Nicks' former boyfriend Don Henley claimed that the song was about their unborn child. In 1979, Nicks said, "If I ever have a little girl, I will name her Sara. It's a very special name to me." Nicks said in a 2014 interview with Billboard that "had I married Don and had that baby, and had she been a girl, I would have named her Sara... It's accurate, but not the entirety of it."

In his 2014 autobiography, Fleetwood agreed with the suggestion that the song referred to his affair with Sara Recor while he and Nicks were involved in a romantic relationship. The lyrics, "and he was just like a great dark wing/within the wings of a storm" refer to Fleetwood being an emotional comfort zone for Nicks following her breakup with fellow band member Lindsey Buckingham. Although the relationship was not exclusive on either side, Fleetwood stated that Nicks became upset when she learned of Fleetwood's relationship with her best friend, Sara. This relationship effectively ended the romance between Nicks and Fleetwood.

== Recording ==
"Sara" began as a 16-minute demo with Sara Recor by her side. "[She] kept the cassettes coming and made sure we didn't run out of batteries, and it was a long, long night recording that demo." Upon completing the demo, she showed the 16-minute song to JD Souther and Don Henley, who both said "You know what, it's almost not too long. It's almost good in its full 16 minuteness–it's got all these great verses and it just kinda travels the world of your relationships." She recorded the demo in a Dallas recording studio situated in a renovated church. The recording studio was owned by Gordon Perry, who was acquainted with Keith Olsen, who produced the Buckingham Nicks album.

Rojas and Ken Caillat listened to the cassette for "Sara" and encouraged Nicks to refine it further so she could present it to the rest of the band. Rojas suggested to Nicks that they record another demo on a Sunday, which she agreed to. Tom Moncrieff, who later played bass on Nicks' Bella Donna album in 1981, assisted with the recording of the new demo at The Village Recorders by providing acoustic guitars and bass. Moncrieff's girlfriend, Annie McLoone, also sang backing vocals. Moncrieff used a Fender Precision Bass for this recording, which was sent through a fat box effects unit.

Nicks sang her lead vocals while playing a tack piano, which was recorded with two AKG 451 microphones. Originally, the band wanted Christine McVie to redo Nicks' piano part and planned for Nicks to record a new vocal take, but upon listening to the recording, they realized that "the timing of it was so individual-there was no way Chris could get in there." Nicks' piano leaked into her vocal mic, which made it difficult to separate the vocals and piano. Some of the other members objected to the use of Nicks' vocals and piano; they believed that the timing was "all over the place", so Fleetwood decided to play brushes on the recording instead of drum sticks to allow for a more fluid performance. Fleetwood spent around 24 hours "dropping in phrases, schmoozing my way around her timing... that's the track that survived, with Stevie playing the piano".

Nicks determined that she needed to cut some verses from "Sara" to make it a viable contender for Tusk and struggled to bring the song under seven minutes. She accordingly worked to make the song more concise by retaining the verses that she believed were most effective in summarising the story she wanted to convey. The song was edited on numerous occasions to cut the track length to a shorter duration for Tusk. The first edit took place after the recording of Fleetwood's drum track; Rojas edited the multitrack tape to bring "Sara" to 13 minutes in length, which was done in preparation for the overdubbing of John McVie's bass track to replace the part recorded by Moncrieff. John McVie played his parts on a Höfner 500/1 violin bass and achieved a satisfactory take after a few attempts.

The song was edited down again to prepare for the addition of Buckingham's guitars and Christine McVie's piano. Caillat invited Christine McVie back to the studio to record a second piano part to coincide with the piano played by Nicks. The two piano tracks were then hard-panned to separate channels, with Nicks' piano being placed on the left channel and McVie's on the right. Buckingham played his electric guitar parts on a Fender Stratocaster, with one signal sent to a Neve mixing console and another through a Mesa/Boogie amplifier. A Sony Lavalier microphone was also placed between the guitar pickup to capture the picking of the strings. Moncrieff claimed that some of his acoustic guitar playing was also retained in the final mix. The song underwent further edits, which continued until Nicks was unwilling to cut the length any further. She mentioned in a 2024 interview that she would have cut "Sara" from the track list entirely if the length had been brought down to a length of under four-and-a-half minutes and would have instead compromised for fewer songs on the album with a longer duration.

== Critical reception ==
Billboard thought that Stevie Nicks' lead vocals and the "midtempo backing" arrangement contributed to the song's "melodic texture" and accessibility. Cash Box called "Sara" "a lush, entrancing Stevie Nicks composition, with effectively echoed lead vocals by Nicks" and called the arrangement "glistening". Record World said that "While Stevie's vocals haunt, the inimitable McVie-Fleetwood rhythm section hypnotizes." Writing for Music Week, Tony Jasper called "Sara" a "haunting single" with a "quiet insistent feel". He also expressed his opinion that the single edit was superior to the album version.

Matthew Fiander of PopMatters described the single-edit of "Sara" as a "claustrophobic four-ish minutes", but was more complimentary of both the 6:22 version and the extended mix found on the deluxe edition of Tusk. Mojo also stated their preference for the extended version of "Sara" and called the shorter edits, "by comparison, acts of sacrilege." The Guardian and Paste ranked the song number five and number 15 respectively on their lists of the 30 greatest Fleetwood Mac songs.

== Versions ==
The version of the song featured on the original vinyl release of Tusk was the unedited 6:22 version, but when Tusk was first released as a single compact disc in 1987 it featured the edited single version, which leaves out the middle verse and musical bridge. It was not until the 1988 Fleetwood Mac Greatest Hits compilation was released that the 6:22 version of the song became available on compact disc.

There is a different edit with Nicks declaring at the beginning of the demo recording, "I don't want to be a cleaning lady!" This version lasts almost nine minutes and was released on later editions of Tusk, including the 2004 remaster. This version was marked with the date of 3/10/1979 on the 2015 deluxe edition of Tusk.

On 5 November 2015, a live version was released as part of a remastered Tusk. This recording features a heavier hitting drum beat from Fleetwood. The 2018 Fleetwood Mac 50 Years – Don't Stop album includes the single edit of the song.

== Plagiarism suit ==
In 1980, Nicks was sued for plagiarism by Carol L. Hinton, a songwriter who claimed that she submitted a poem called "Sarah" to Warner Bros. in December 1978, which shared similar lyrics to the song released by Fleetwood Mac, including the lines "When you build a house...call me" and "drowning in the sea of love". In January 1980, Nicks contacted Hinton in an effort to resolve the matter, saying that it was "karma" that the two creative works shared these lyrical similarities. Hinton filed the poem with the United States Copyright Office on 1 April 1980 and sued Nicks one month later to receive compensation for "exemplary and punitive damages" and also called for all copies of "Sara" to be eliminated. Nicks showed that she had written and recorded a demo version of the song in July 1978, before the lyrics were sent to Warner, and the complainant accepted that no plagiarism had occurred.

== Personnel ==
- Stevie Nicks – lead vocals, tack piano
- Lindsey Buckingham – guitars, backing vocals
- Christine McVie – piano, backing vocals
- John McVie – bass guitar
- Mick Fleetwood – drums

== Charts ==
=== Weekly charts ===
Weekly chart performance for "Sara"
Chart (1979–1980)	Peak position
Australia (Kent Music Report)	11
Belgium (Ultratop 50 Flanders)	14
Canada Top Singles (RPM)	12
Canada Adult Contemporary (RPM)	3
French Singles Chart	31
Germany (GfK)	44
Netherlands (Single Top 100)	14
New Zealand (Recorded Music NZ)	12
South African Singles Chart	18
UK Singles (Official Charts)	37
US Billboard Hot 100	7
US Adult Contemporary (Billboard)	13
US Cash Box Top 100	6
US Pop/Adult Airplay (Radio & Records)	7
US Top-40 (Radio & Records)	1
US Record World Singles	7

=== Year-end charts ===
Year-end chart performance for "Sara"
Chart (1980)	Rank
Australia (Kent Music Report)	99
US Top Pop Singles (Billboard)	87
US Cash Box Top 100	55
US Pop/Adult Airplay (Radio & Records)	72
US Top-40 (Radio & Records)	40

== Certifications ==
Certifications for "Sara"
Region	Certification	Certified units/sales
United Kingdom (BPI)	Gold	400,000^{‡}
^{‡} Sales+streaming figures based on certification alone.
