= Ken Caillat =

American record producer

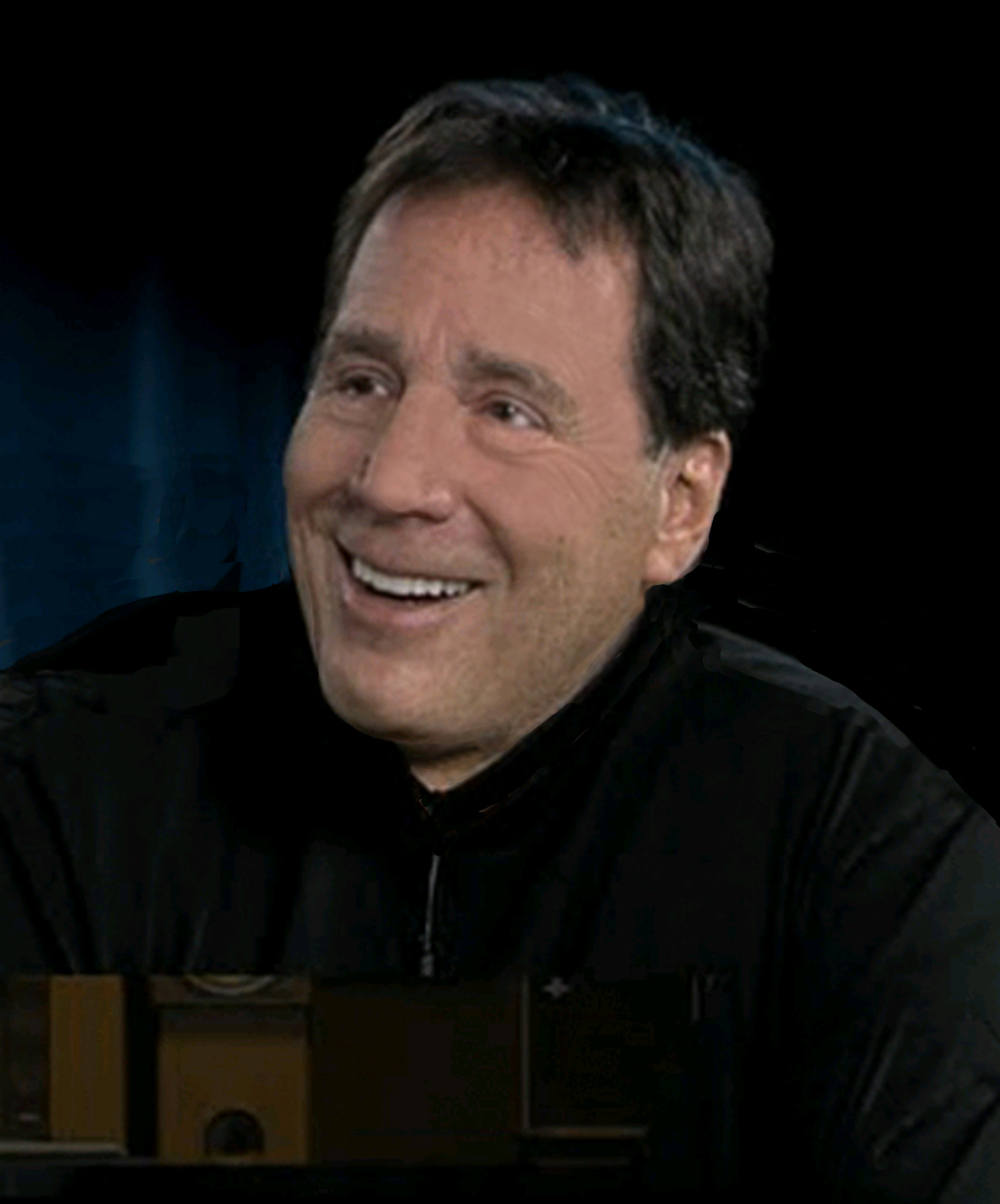
- Caillat during a 2012 interview

Background information
- Born: Kenneth Douglas Caillat; August 12, 1946 (age 80); San Jose, California, U.S.
- Genres: Rock; pop; R&B; country; soul; jazz
- Occupation: Record producer
- Years active: 1971–present
- Website: www.kencaillat.com

Kenneth Douglas Caillat (/kæˈleɪ/ kal-AY; born August 12, 1946) is an American record producer. He is best known for producing the Fleetwood Mac albums Rumours, Tusk and Mirage. He is the father of singer Colbie Caillat.

== Life and career ==
Caillat was the president of 5.1 Entertainment Group Digital Production Services, which has worked on albums for Billy Idol, Frank Sinatra, Pat Benatar, Wilson Phillips, the Beach Boys, Herbie Hancock, David Becker and Alice Cooper as well as Christine McVie on her solo album In the Meantime, in addition to Fleetwood Mac, remastering several of their albums in 5.1 surround sound. He won a Grammy Award for Album of the Year for Rumours.

In addition to production, he has been a director, studio engineer, author and musician. In 2012 he released his memoir on his experiences engineering the 1977 Rumours album, called Making Rumours. In 2013, Caillat cofounded Sleeping Giant Music Group, LLC (a Sleeping Giant Media company) with Grammy nominated writer/producer Michael Hodges and writer/producer Kayla Morrison. In 2014, Sleeping Giant partnered with Alcon Entertainment to form ASG Music Group, LLC.

He is the father of singer-songwriter Colbie Caillat and produced her albums Coco (2007), Breakthrough (2009), All of You (2011), and Christmas in the Sand (2012). He advised his daughter on taking up songwriting from an early age. In an interview with the Music Producers Forum, he recalls telling a young Colbie, "If you're really going to be a singer, then you have two choices, you're going to have to write your own songs, or you're going to have to buy somebody else's."

In January 2016, Caillat, who had a passion for the history of the Record Plant studio in Sausalito, California, where Rumours had been recorded, realized the necessity for its restoration. After developing what was thought to be a more sustainable business model for the music industry, he incorporated under the name Marin Music Project at the Record Plant in January 2017.

In 2024, Caillat sued the creators of the 2023 Tony-Award-winning play Stereophonic, alleging that they adapted his memoir Making Rumours: The Inside Story of the Classic Fleetwood Mac Album without permission.

== Production discography ==
- How Time Flys (1973) – David Ossman (Engineer)
- Fairytale (1965) – Donovan (Producer)
- Basket of Light (1969) – Pentangle (Executive producer)
- Astrud Gilberto Now (1972) – Astrud Gilberto (Executive producer)
- "It Never Rains in Southern California" (1972) [Albert Hammond] (demo engineer)
- "Bang a Gong" (1972) [[[T-Rex]]/Marc Boland](demo engineer)
- Love Music (1973) – Sergio Mendes (Assistant)
- "Poetry Man" [Phoebe Snow] (1973) demo Wally Heider Recording Studio 4 (demo Engineer)
- The Phoenix Concerts (1974) – John Stewart (Assistant engineer, engineer)
- "You Are a Star" (1974) [[[Bernie Taupin]] with the Hudson Brothers] (engineer)
- Where We All Belong (1974) – The Marshall Tucker Band (Engineer)
- "Venus and Mars" (1974) [[[Paul McCartney and Wings]]] (engineer strings, sid sharp arr.)
- Elevation (1973) – Pharoah Sanders (Engineer)
- Gabby Pahinui Hawaiian Band, Vol. 1 (1975) – Gabby Pahinui (Engineer)
- The Waimea Music Festival (1974) (Engineer, Mixer)
- Searchin' for a Rainbow (1975) – The Marshall Tucker Band (Engineer)
- Amazonas (1975) – Cal Tjader (Remixing, engineer)
- Cool Rasta (1976) – The Heptones (Executive producer)
- Greatest Stories Live (1976) – Harry Chapin (Engineer)
- Look at Me Now – The Buckeye Politicians (Engineer)
- Warren Zevon (1976) – Warren Zevon (Audio engineer)
- Rumours (1977) – Fleetwood Mac (Producer, Engineer, Mastering); Winner Grammy Award for Album of the Year.
- Germfree Adolescents (1978) – X-Ray Spex (Executive producer)
- Tusk (1979) – Fleetwood Mac (producer, Remastering, engineer)
- Distant Shores (1980) – Robbie Patton (Engineer, producer)
- Live (1980) – Fleetwood Mac (producer, Engineer, mixing)
- Mirage (1982) – Fleetwood Mac (Engineer, producer)
- Photon: The Ultimate Game on Planet Earth (1982) - (Engineer, producer)
- Which One of Us Is Me (1984) – Jay Gruska (Engineer)
- Dancing on the Ceiling (1986) – Lionel Richie (Special Effects, engineer)
- Bad (1987) – Michael Jackson (Engineer)
- Streamlines (1987) – Tom Scott
- "The Cockney Kids Are Innocent" on The First, the Best and the Last (1980) – Sham 69 (Executive producer)
- "Siberian Express" (1988) David BeckerTribune (Producer, engineer)
- Live (1988) – The Dramatics (Engineer)
- Greatest Hits (1988) – Fleetwood Mac (Producer)
- Dorian's Legacy (1989) – Spencer Brewer (Engineer)
- Live and Improvised (1991) – Blood, Sweat & Tears (Engineer)
- Live at Ronnie Scott's (1990) – Taj Mahal (Executive producer)
- Third Time Around (1990) – David Becker Tribune (Engineer, mixing, producer)
- 25 Years – The Chain (1992) – Fleetwood Mac (Producer, engineer)
- How Far? How Fast? (1992) – Robin Frederick (Design, producer, mixing, engineer)
- Mom's (1992) – Carl Stone (Audio engineer)
- Seven Day Weekend (1992) – New York Dolls (Executive producer)
- Deaf Forever: The Best of Motörhead (2000) – Motörhead (Executive producer)
- Fiend with a Violin (1996) – The Fall (Executive producer)
- Very Best of the Searchers (1998) – The Searchers (Executive producer)
- Close to the Wind (1998) – Fairport Convention (Executive producer)
- Tchaikovsky: Nutcracker (Highlights) (DVD Audio) – London Symphony Orchestra (Producer, executive producer)
- Erase the Slate (1999) – Dokken (Executive producer)
- The Little David Years (1971–1977) (1999) – George Carlin (Engineer)
- Directions: East – Directions (Executive producer)
- Directions: North – Directions (Executive producer)
- Directions: South – Directions (Executive producer)
- Directions: West – Directions (Executive producer)
- Elements: Earth – Elements (Executive producer, producer)
- Elements: Spirit – Elements (Executive producer, producer)
- Elements: Water – Elements (Executive producer, producer)
- Bare Bones (1999) – Wishbone Ash (Executive producer)
- Then and Now (2000) – Lynyrd Skynyrd (Executive producer, mixing)
- Coco (2007) – Colbie Caillat (Executive producer, mixing, producer, audio production)
- Breakthrough (2009) – Colbie Caillat (Mixing, producer, engineer, Rhythm Arrangements, executive producer)
- All of You (2011) – Colbie Caillat (producer)
- Christmas in the Sand (2012) – Colbie Caillat (producer)

== Sources ==
- Official website
- Fleetwood Mac Official site
- 5.1 Entertainment Group, MIX Magazine
- Recording Academy's Producers & Engineers Wing Presents "Approaching the First 5.1 Mix" Business Wire, December 6, 2000
