= 50 Years – Don't Stop =

Box set by Fleetwood Mac
- Released: 16 November 2018
- Recorded: 1967–2013
- Genre: Rock
- Length: 75:48 (Standard 1-disc edition); 186:01 (Deluxe 3-disc edition)
- Label: Rhino
- Producers: Fleetwood Mac; Richard Dashut; Ken Caillat

Fleetwood Mac chronology
Fleetwood Mac: Opus Collection (2013)	50 Years – Don't Stop (2018)	Before the Beginning: 1968–1970 Live & Demo Sessions (2019)

Professional ratings
Review scores
Source	Rating
AllMusic	4.5/5 stars

50 Years – Don't Stop is a compilation album by British-American rock band Fleetwood Mac, released on 16 November 2018, marking 50 years since the band's formation. Consisting of three CDs, the set spans the history of the band from 1967 to 2013. It was also released as a 5-LP set and a condensed single CD version. Unlike its predecessor, 25 Years – The Chain (1992), this album does not feature any previously unreleased material. It does, however, mark the first time certain tracks have been remastered or released in a physical format, as is the case with "Sad Angel".

Other songs appear in their single edit form, like "Sands of Time" and "Heroes Are Hard to Find". Up until the release of 50 Years, these mixes had been out of print for decades.

In November 2023, the album tallied its 260th week on the UK Albums Chart, making it the band's third-longest-charting album after Rumours and The Very Best of Fleetwood Mac. It surpassed the latter in November 2025 and reached a new chart peak of number 3 in January 2026.

50 Years – Don't Stop has been one of the UK's top 10 biggest-selling albums every year of the 2020s, increasing year-on-year. It was the 5th biggest seller in 2025.

== Background ==
50 Years – Don't Stop is Fleetwood Mac's most recent career-spanning collection. It features liner notes by veteran music writer David Wild. The Belfast Telegraph said of the album, "The 50-track compilation is the sound of a band pulling themselves apart, and putting themselves back together, over the course of half a century."

== CD track listing ==
=== Standard one-disc edition ===
No.	Title	Writer(s)	Source	Length
1.	"Don't Stop"	Christine McVie	Rumours (1977)	3:13
2.	"Go Your Own Way"	Lindsey Buckingham	Rumours (1977)	3:39
3.	"Dreams"	Stevie Nicks	Rumours (1977)	4:17
4.	"The Chain"	Buckingham, Mick Fleetwood, C. McVie, John McVie, Nicks	Rumours (1977)	4:29
5.	"Landslide"	Nicks	Fleetwood Mac (1975)	3:20
6.	"Rhiannon (Will You Ever Win)" (single version)	Nicks	Fleetwood Mac (1975)	3:46
7.	"Everywhere"	C. McVie	Tango in the Night (1987)	3:43
8.	"Little Lies"	C. McVie, Eddy Quintela	Tango in the Night (1987)	3:39
9.	"Never Going Back Again (Live)"	Buckingham	Live (1980)	4:07
10.	"Tusk"	Buckingham	Tusk (1979)	3:38
11.	"Sara" (single version)	Nicks	Tusk (1979)	4:36
12.	"Gypsy"	Nicks	Mirage (1982)	4:23
13.	"Hold Me"	C. McVie, Robbie Patton	Mirage (1982)	3:44
14.	"Big Love"	Buckingham	Tango in the Night (1987)	3:42
15.	"Seven Wonders"	Nicks, Sandy Stewart	Tango in the Night (1987)	3:39
16.	"Save Me"	C. McVie, Quintela	Behind the Mask (1990)	4:06
17.	"Peacekeeper"	Buckingham	Say You Will (2003)	4:10
18.	"Albatross"	Peter Green	non-album single (1968)	3:14
19.	"Man of the World"	Green	non-album single (1969)	2:51
20.	"Oh Well (Part 1)" (single version)	Green	Then Play On (1969)	3:32
Total length:				75:48

=== Deluxe three-disc edition ===
Disc 1
No.	Title	Writer(s)	Original release	Length
1.	"Shake Your Moneymaker"	Elmore James	Fleetwood Mac (1968)	2:57
2.	"Black Magic Woman"	Peter Green	non-album single (1968); included on compilations English Rose (1969, US only) and The Pious Bird of Good Omen (1969)	2:55
3.	"Need Your Love So Bad"	Little Willie John, Mertis John Jr.	non-album single (1968); included on compilation The Pious Bird of Good Omen (1969)	3:56
4.	"Albatross"	Green	non-album single (1968); included on compilations English Rose (1969, US only) and The Pious Bird of Good Omen (1969)	3:14
5.	"Man of the World"	Green	non-album single (1969); included on compilation Greatest Hits (1971, UK only)	2:51
6.	"Oh Well (Pt. 1)"	Green	non-album single (1969); included on revised US release of Then Play On (1969, US only)	3:32
7.	"Rattlesnake Shake"	Green	Then Play On (1969)	3:33
8.	"The Green Manalishi (With the Two Prong Crown)"	Green	non-album single (1970); included on compilation Greatest Hits (1971, UK only)	4:39
9.	"Tell Me All the Things You Do"	Danny Kirwan	Kiln House (1970)	4:12
10.	"Station Man" (single version)	Kirwan, John McVie, Jeremy Spencer	Kiln House (1970)	5:12
11.	"Sands of Time" (single version)	Kirwan	Future Games (1971)	3:03
12.	"Spare Me a Little of Your Love"	Christine McVie	Bare Trees (1972)	3:47
13.	"Sentimental Lady" (single version)	Bob Welch	Bare Trees (1972)	3:02
14.	"Did You Ever Love Me"	C. McVie, Welch	Penguin (1973)	3:43
15.	"Emerald Eyes"	Welch	Mystery to Me (1973)	3:34
16.	"Hypnotized"	Welch	Mystery to Me (1973)	4:49
17.	"Heroes Are Hard to Find" (single version)	C. McVie	Heroes Are Hard to Find (1974)	2:46
Total length:				61:45

Disc 2
No.	Title	Writer(s)	Original release	Length
1.	"Monday Morning"	Lindsey Buckingham	Fleetwood Mac (1975)	2:47
2.	"Over My Head" (single version)	C. McVie	Fleetwood Mac (1975)	3:09
3.	"Rhiannon (Will You Ever Win)" (single version)	Stevie Nicks	Fleetwood Mac (1975)	3:46
4.	"Say You Love Me" (single version)	C. McVie	Fleetwood Mac (1975)	4:02
5.	"Landslide"	Nicks	Fleetwood Mac (1975)	3:20
6.	"Go Your Own Way"	Buckingham	Rumours (1977)	3:39
7.	"Dreams"	Nicks	Rumours (1977)	4:17
8.	"Second Hand News"	Buckingham	Rumours (1977)	2:54
9.	"Don't Stop"	C. McVie	Rumours (1977)	3:13
10.	"The Chain"	Buckingham, Mick Fleetwood, C. McVie, J. McVie, Nicks	Rumours (1977)	4:29
11.	"You Make Loving Fun"	C. McVie	Rumours (1977)	3:36
12.	"Tusk"	Buckingham	Tusk (1979)	3:38
13.	"Sara" (single version)	Nicks	Tusk (1979)	4:36
14.	"Think About Me" (single version)	C. McVie	Tusk (1979)	2:44
15.	"Fireflies" (single version)	Nicks	Live (1980)	3:33
16.	"Never Going Back Again" (live)	Buckingham	Live (1980)	4:07
Total length:				57:43

Disc 3
No.	Title	Writer(s)	Original release	Length
1.	"Hold Me"	C. McVie, Robbie Patton	Mirage (1982)	3:44
2.	"Gypsy"	Nicks	Mirage (1982)	4:23
3.	"Love in Store"	C.McVie, Jim Recor	Mirage (1982)	3:14
4.	"Oh Diane"	Buckingham, Richard Dashut	Mirage (1982)	2:36
5.	"Big Love"	Buckingham	Tango in the Night (1987)	3:42
6.	"Seven Wonders"	Nicks, Sandy Stewart	Tango in the Night (1987)	3:39
7.	"Little Lies"	C. McVie, Eddy Quintela	Tango in the Night (1987)	3:39
8.	"Everywhere"	C. McVie	Tango in the Night (1987)	3:43
9.	"As Long as You Follow"	C. McVie, Quintela	Greatest Hits (1988)	4:20
10.	"Save Me" (single version)	C. McVie, Quintela	Behind the Mask (1990)	4:06
11.	"Love Shines"	C. McVie, Quintela	25 Years – The Chain (1992)	4:48
12.	"Paper Doll"	John Heron, Nicks, Rick Vito	25 Years – The Chain (1992)	3:58
13.	"I Do" (edit)	C. McVie, Quintela	Time (1995)	3:49
14.	"Silver Springs" (live edit)	Nicks	The Dance (1997)	4:50
15.	"Peacekeeper"	Buckingham	Say You Will (2003)	4:10
16.	"Say You Will" (new mix)	Nicks	Say You Will (2003)	3:49
17.	"Sad Angel"	Buckingham	Extended Play (2013)	4:03
Total length:				66:33

== Streaming track listing ==
The track listing on streaming services made multiple changes. The track order discards the chronological order used in the deluxe 3CD, vinyl and digital editions. Additionally, ten songs were replaced (*), including five from the Peter Green era, and two songs swapped the live version for its studio counterpart (**). The ten songs excluded are listed below for reference.

Version on Amazon Music, Apple Music and Spotify
No.	Title	Writer(s)	Original release	Length
1.	"Don't Stop"	Christine McVie	Rumours (1977)	3:13
2.	"Go Your Own Way"	Lindsey Buckingham	Rumours (1977)	3:39
3.	"Dreams"	Stevie Nicks	Rumours (1977)	4:17
4.	"The Chain"	Buckingham, Mick Fleetwood, C. McVie, John McVie, Nicks	Rumours (1977)	4:29
5.	"Landslide"	Nicks	Fleetwood Mac (1975)	3:20
6.	"Rhiannon (Will You Ever Win)" (single version)	Nicks	Fleetwood Mac (1975)	3:46
7.	"Everywhere"	C. McVie	Tango in the Night (1987)	3:43
8.	"Little Lies"	C. McVie, Eddy Quintela	Tango in the Night (1987)	3:39
9.	"Never Going Back Again" (**)	Buckingham	Rumours (1977)	2:04
10.	"Tusk"	Buckingham	Tusk (1979)	3:38
11.	"Sara" (single version)	Nicks	Tusk (1979)	4:36
12.	"Gypsy"	Nicks	Mirage (1982)	4:23
13.	"Hold Me"	C. McVie, Robbie Patton	Mirage (1982)	3:44
14.	"Big Love"	Buckingham	Tango in the Night (1987)	3:42
15.	"Seven Wonders"	Nicks, Sandy Stewart	Tango in the Night (1987)	3:39
16.	"Oh Well (Pt. 1)"	Peter Green	non-album single (1969); included on revised US release of Then Play On (1969, US only)	3:32
17.	"The Green Manalishi (With the Two Prong Crown)"	Green	non-album single (1970); included on compilation Greatest Hits (1971, UK only)	4:39
18.	"Rattlesnake Shake"	Green	Then Play On (1969)	3:33
19.	"Hypnotized"	Bob Welch	Mystery to Me (1973)	4:49
20.	"Tell Me All the Things You Do"	Danny Kirwan	Kiln House (1970)	4:12
21.	"Sands of Time" (single version)	Kirwan	Future Games (1971)	3:03
22.	"Sentimental Lady" (single version)	Welch	Bare Trees (1972)	3:02
23.	"Did You Ever Love Me"	C. McVie, Welch	Penguin (1973)	3:43
24.	"For Your Love" (*)	Graham Gouldman	Mystery to Me (1973)	3:46
25.	"Heroes Are Hard to Find" (single version)	C. McVie	Heroes Are Hard to Find (1974)	2:46
26.	"Warm Ways" (*)	C. McVie	Fleetwood Mac (1975)	3:53
27.	"You Make Loving Fun"	C. McVie	Rumours (1977)	3:36
28.	"Not That Funny" (*)	Buckingham	Tusk (1979)	3:14
29.	"Love in Store"	C. McVie, Jim Recor	Mirage (1982)	3:14
30.	"Family Man" (*)	Buckingham, Richard Dashut	Tango in the Night (1987)	4:07
31.	"As Long as You Follow"	C. McVie, Quintela	Greatest Hits (1988)	4:20
32.	"Save Me" (single version)	C. McVie, Quintela	Behind the Mask (1990)	4:06
33.	"Love Shines"	C. McVie, Quintela	25 Years – The Chain (1992)	4:48
34.	"I Do" (edit)	C. McVie, Quintela	Time (1995)	3:49
35.	"Peacekeeper"	Buckingham	Say You Will (2003)	4:10
36.	"Jewel Eyed Judy" (*)	Kirwan, Fleetwood, J. McVie	Kiln House (1970)	3:19
37.	"Spare Me a Little of Your Love"	C. McVie	Bare Trees (1972)	3:47
38.	"Remember Me" (*)	C. McVie	Penguin (1973)	3:47
39.	"Over My Head" (single version)	C. McVie	Fleetwood Mac (1975)	3:09
40.	"Say You Love Me" (single version)	C. McVie	Fleetwood Mac (1975)	4:02
41.	"Silver Springs" (**)	Nicks	non-album single (1976); included on compilation 25 Years – The Chain (1992) and Rumours reissue (2004)	4:29
42.	"Think About Me" (single version)	C. McVie	Tusk (1979)	2:44
43.	"Oh Diane"	Buckingham, Dashut	Mirage (1982)	2:36
44.	"Isn't It Midnight" (*)	C. McVie, Quintela, Buckingham	Tango in the Night (1987)	4:13
45.	"No Questions Asked" (*)	Nicks, Kelly Johnston	Greatest Hits (1988)	4:42
46.	"Skies the Limit" (*)	C. McVie, Quintela	Behind the Mask (1990)	3:46
47.	"Love Is Dangerous" (*)	Rick Vito, Nicks	Behind the Mask (1990)	3:18
48.	"Paper Doll"	John Heron, Nicks, Vito	25 Years – The Chain (1992)	3:58
49.	"Say You Will" (new mix)	Nicks	Say You Will (2003)	3:49
50.	"Sad Angel"	Buckingham	Extended Play (2013)	4:03
Total length:				3:07:00

(*) Exclusive to streaming version
(**) Studio version; live version included on non-streaming releases

Excluded from streaming version
No.	Title	Writer(s)	Original release	Length
1.	"Shake Your Moneymaker"	Elmore James	Fleetwood Mac (1968)	2:57
2.	"Black Magic Woman"	Green	non-album single (1968)	2:55
3.	"Need Your Love So Bad"	Little Willie John, Mertis John Jr.	non-album single (1968)	3:56
4.	"Albatross"	Green	non-album single (1968)	3:14
5.	"Man of the World"	Green	non-album single (1969)	2:51
6.	"Station Man" (single version)	Kirwan, J. McVie, Jeremy Spencer	Kiln House (1970)	5:12
7.	"Emerald Eyes"	Welch	Mystery to Me (1973)	3:34
8.	"Monday Morning"	Buckingham	Fleetwood Mac (1975)	2:47
9.	"Second Hand News"	Buckingham	Rumours (1977)	2:54
10.	"Fireflies" (single version)	Nicks	Live (1980)	3:33

== Vinyl track listing ==
Side A
No.	Title	Writer(s)	Length
1.	"Shake Your Moneymaker" (from Fleetwood Mac, 1968)	Elmore James	2:57
2.	"Black Magic Woman" (non-album single, 1968)	Peter Green	2:55
3.	"Need Your Love So Bad" (non-album single, 1968)	Little Willie John, Mertis John Jr.	3:56
4.	"Albatross" (non-album single, 1968)	Green	3:14
5.	"Man of the World" (non-album single, 1969)	Green	2:51
Total length:			15:53

Side B
No.	Title	Writer(s)	Length
1.	"Oh Well (Pt. 1)" (single version; from Then Play On, 1969)	Green	3:32
2.	"Rattlesnake Shake" (from Then Play On, 1969)	Green	3:33
3.	"The Green Manalishi (With the Two Prong Crown)" (non-album single, 1970)	Green	4:39
4.	"Tell Me All the Things You Do" (from Kiln House, 1970)	Danny Kirwan	4:12
5.	"Station Man" (single version; from Kiln House, 1970)	Kirwan, John McVie, Jeremy Spencer	5:12
Total length:			21:08

Side C
No.	Title	Writer(s)	Length
1.	"Sands of Time" (single version; from Future Games, 1971)	Kirwan	3:03
2.	"Spare Me a Little of Your Love" (from Bare Trees, 1972)	Christine McVie	3:47
3.	"Sentimental Lady" (single version; from Bare Trees, 1972)	Bob Welch	3:02
4.	"Did You Ever Love Me" (from Penguin, 1973)	C. McVie, Welch	3:43
5.	"Emerald Eyes" (from Mystery to Me, 1973)	Welch	3:34
Total length:			17:09

Side D
No.	Title	Writer(s)	Length
1.	"Hypnotized" (from Mystery to Me, 1973)	Welch	4:49
2.	"Heroes Are Hard to Find" (single version; from Heroes Are Hard to Find, 1974)	C. McVie	2:46
3.	"Monday Morning" (from Fleetwood Mac, 1975)	Lindsey Buckingham	2:47
4.	"Over My Head" (single version; from Fleetwood Mac, 1975)	C. McVie	3:09
5.	"Rhiannon (Will You Ever Win)" (single version; from Fleetwood Mac, 1975)	Stevie Nicks	3:46
Total length:			17:17

Side E
No.	Title	Writer(s)	Length
6.	"Say You Love Me" (single version; from Fleetwood Mac, 1975)	C. McVie	4:02
7.	"Landslide" (from Fleetwood Mac, 1975)	Nicks	3:20
8.	"Go Your Own Way" (from Rumours, 1977)	Buckingham	3:39
9.	"Dreams" (from Rumours, 1977)	Nicks	4:17
10.	"Second Hand News" (from Rumours, 1977)	Buckingham	2:54
Total length:			18:12

Side F
No.	Title	Writer(s)	Length
1.	"Don't Stop" (from Rumours, 1977)	C. McVie	3:13
2.	"The Chain" (from Rumours, 1977)	Buckingham, Mick Fleetwood, C. McVie, J. McVie, Nicks	4:29
3.	"You Make Loving Fun" (from Rumours, 1977)	C. McVie	3:36
4.	"Tusk" (from Tusk, 1979)	Buckingham	3:38
5.	"Sara" (single version; from Tusk, 1979)	Nicks	4:36
Total length:			19:32

Side G
No.	Title	Writer(s)	Length
1.	"Think About Me" (single version; from Tusk, 1979)	C. McVie	2:44
2.	"Fireflies" (single version; from Live, 1980)	Nicks	3:33
3.	"Never Going Back Again (Live)" (from Live, 1980)	Buckingham	4:07
4.	"Hold Me" (from Mirage, 1982)	C. McVie, Robbie Patton	3:44
5.	"Gypsy" (from Mirage, 1982)	Nicks	4:23
Total length:			18:31

Side H
No.	Title	Writer(s)	Length
1.	"Love in Store" (from Mirage, 1982)	C. McVie, Jim Recor	3:14
2.	"Oh Diane" (from Mirage, 1982)	Buckingham, Richard Dashut	2:36
3.	"Big Love" (from Tango in the Night, 1987)	Buckingham	3:42
4.	"Seven Wonders" (from Tango in the Night, 1987)	Nicks, Sandy Stewart	3:39
5.	"Little Lies" (from Tango in the Night, 1987)	C. McVie, Eddy Quintela	3:39
Total length:			16:50

Side I
No.	Title	Writer(s)	Length
1.	"Everywhere" (from Tango in the Night, 1987)	C. McVie	3:43
2.	"As Long as You Follow" (from Greatest Hits, 1988)	C. McVie, Quintela	4:20
3.	"Save Me" (single version; from Behind the Mask, 1990)	C. McVie, Quintela	4:06
4.	"Love Shines" (from 25 Years – The Chain, 1992)	C. McVie, Quintela	4:48
5.	"Paper Doll" (from 25 Years – The Chain, 1992)	John Heron, Nicks, Rick Vito	3:58
Total length:			20:55

Side J
No.	Title	Writer(s)	Length
1.	"I Do" (edit; from Time, 1995)	C. McVie, Quintela	3:49
2.	"Silver Springs (Live)" (edit; from The Dance, 1997)	Nicks	4:50
3.	"Peacekeeper" (from Say You Will, 2003)	Buckingham	4:10
4.	"Say You Will" (from Say You Will, 2003)	Nicks	3:49
5.	"Sad Angel" (from Extended Play, 2013)	Buckingham	4:03
Total length:			20:41

== Charts ==
=== Weekly charts ===
Chart (2018–2026)	Peak position
Australian Albums (ARIA)	7
Belgian Albums (Ultratop Flanders)	16
Belgian Albums (Ultratop Wallonia)	109
Canadian Albums (Billboard)	81
Dutch Albums (Album Top 100)	53
German Albums (Offizielle Top 100)	68
Hungarian Albums (MAHASZ)	29
Irish Albums (Official Charts)	2
New Zealand Albums (RMNZ)	29
Scottish Albums (Official Charts)	4
Spanish Albums (PROMUSICAE)	82
UK Albums (Official Charts)	3
UK Album Downloads (Official Charts)	3
US Billboard 200	65

=== Year-end charts ===
Chart (2018)	Position
UK Albums (OCC)	45

Chart (2019)	Position
Irish Albums (IRMA)	19
UK Albums (OCC)	13

Chart (2020)	Position
Irish Albums (IRMA)	6
UK Albums (OCC)	10

Chart (2021)	Position
Irish Albums (IRMA)	8
UK Albums (OCC)	9

Chart (2022)	Position
UK Albums (OCC)	8

Chart (2023)	Position
UK Albums (OCC)	6

Chart (2024)	Position
UK Albums (OCC)	7

Chart (2025)	Position
UK Albums (OCC)	5

== Certifications ==
Region	Certification	Certified units/sales
United Kingdom (BPI)	7× Platinum	2,100,000^{‡}
^{‡} Sales+streaming figures based on certification alone.

== See also ==
- List of albums which have spent the most weeks on the UK Albums Chart
