= Madison Blues (album) =

- Fleetwood Mac in 1970: L–R: Kirwan, Spencer, C. McVie, J. McVie, Fleetwood.

Compilation album by Fleetwood Mac
- Released: 2003
- Recorded: 1970–71
- Genre: Blues rock
- Length: 2:08:47
- Label: Shakedown Records

Madison Blues – Live & Studio Recordings (or just Madison Blues) is a compilation album by British blues rock band Fleetwood Mac, released in 2003. It is a compilation of BBC session tracks and live concert material from the band's second post-Peter Green lineup, none of which had previously been officially released.

The album focuses specifically on the Kiln House album's tour and period of the band. Following Green's departure, Jeremy Spencer, Danny Kirwan, John McVie, and Mick Fleetwood continued as a four-piece, but Christine McVie was asked to officially join the band shortly prior to the start of their American tour in July 1970. This is also prior to the addition of guitarist Bob Welch, who joined in 1971. Packaged as a double CD with a DVD interview with guitarist Jeremy Spencer, it came in a cardboard box with a foldout inner sheet. The release also included four tracks by the Christine Perfect Band, which was planned as a project for Christine McVie in 1969, after her brief solo career. This was later abandoned as she joined Fleetwood Mac in the summer of 1970.

Madison Blues has since been repackaged several times as single disc releases. Perfect Days (2008) and Perfect in Every Way (2010) are identical compilations of tracks from disc one of this set; while Crazy About the Blues (2010) and Preaching the Blues (2011) are identical to discs one and two of Madison Blues respectively.

== Recording ==
The Christine Perfect Band tracks were recorded on 24 November 1969 at the BBC Recording Studios, Maida Vale, London, for the Dave Lee Travis Sunday Show.

Tracks 5–7 on disc one were recorded on 10 November 1970 at the Paris Cinema, Lower Regent Street, London, for the BBC Radio 1 Club.

Tracks 8–9 on disc one were recorded on 24 November 1970 at Maida Vale for the Mike Harding – Sound of the Seventies programme.

Tracks 10–16 on disc one were recorded live in concert in 1970, and disc two was recorded live in concert in January 1971, shortly before Jeremy Spencer left the band in February. Tracks from the band's most recent album Kiln House feature heavily, but there is also a song ("I'm on My Way") from Christine McVie's solo album Christine Perfect, and another ("Don't Go Please Stay") from Spencer's solo effort Jeremy Spencer. "The Purple Dancer" was the b-side to the band's forthcoming single "Dragonfly", and although it was being played during concerts at this time, the A-side is not present on this release. Spencer's 1950s rock 'n' roll standards are spread throughout the set, along with "The King Speaks", in which Spencer impersonates Elvis Presley.

"Open the Door" was later recorded by Spencer for his 2014 solo album, Coventry Blue, where it was credited to Kirwan and Spencer.

== Track listing ==
=== Disc one ===
==== Christine Perfect Band ====
1. "Hey Baby" (Stan Webb, Christine Perfect, Mike Vernon) – 2:34
2. "It's You I Miss" (Perfect) – 3:44
3. "Gone into the Sun" (Perfect) – 2:43
4. "Tell Me You Need Me" (Perfect) – 3:42

==== Fleetwood Mac (BBC sessions) ====
5. "Crazy About You (Can't Hold Out Much Longer)" (Walter Jacobs) – 3:51
6. "Down at the Crown" (Danny Kirwan) – 3:04
7. "Tell Me All the Things You Do" (Kirwan) – 2:50
8. "Station Man" (Kirwan, Jeremy Spencer, John McVie) – 3:49
9. "The Purple Dancer" (Kirwan, Mick Fleetwood, McVie) – 5:03

==== Fleetwood Mac (Live) ====
10. "Station Man" (Kirwan, Spencer, McVie) – 8:26
11. "Crazy About You (Can't Hold Out Much Longer)" (Jacobs) – 9:24
12. "One Together" (Spencer) – 3:39
13. "I Can't Stop Loving Her" (Spencer) – 4:00
14. "Lonely Without You" (Perfect) – 5:13
15. "Tell Me All the Things You Do" (Kirwan) – 6:02
16. "Jewel Eyed Judy" (Kirwan, Fleetwood, McVie) – 3:57

=== Disc two ===
==== Fleetwood Mac (Live) ====
1. "Madison Blues" (Elmore James) – 4:10
2. "The Purple Dancer" (Kirwan, Fleetwood, McVie) – 7:18
3. "Open the Door" (Kirwan) – 3:04
4. "Preaching Blues" (Son House) – 3:41
5. "Dust My Broom" (James, Robert Johnson) – 3:27
6. "Get Like You Used To Be" (Webb, Perfect) – 3:49
7. "Don't Go Please Stay" (Spencer) – 3:15
8. "Station Man" (Kirwan, Spencer, McVie) – 6:27
9. "I'm on My Way" (Deadric Malone) – 4:57
10. "Jailhouse Rock" (Jerry Leiber, Mike Stoller) – 3:24
11. "The King Speaks" (Narrative) (Spencer) – 2:59
12. "Teenage Darling" (Spencer) – 4:08
13. "Honey Hush" (Big Joe Turner) – 5:37

=== Disc three: DVD ===
1. Interview with Jeremy Spencer by Martin "Jet" Celmins at Shakedown Records HQ, Camden, London, 19 February 2002 – 96:00

== Credits ==
=== Christine Perfect Band ===
- Christine Perfect – keyboards, vocals
- Top Topham – guitar
- Rick Hayward – guitar
- Martin Dunsford – bass guitar
- Chris Harding – percussion, drums

=== Fleetwood Mac ===
- Jeremy Spencer – guitar, vocals
- Danny Kirwan – guitar, vocals
- Christine McVie – keyboards, vocals
- John McVie – bass guitar
- Mick Fleetwood – drums, percussion

=== Production ===
- Mastered by Dennis Blackham at Skye Mastering
- Research by Peter Moody
- Liner notes by Martin "Jet" Celmins
- Photography by LFI, Harry Goodwin/Redferns, Martin "Jet" Celmins
