= Farmer's Daughter =

A farmer's daughter is a stock character who is a desirable and naive young woman.

The Farmer's Daughter or Farmer's Daughter may also refer to:

== Movies ==
- The Farmer's Daughter (1928 film), by scriptwriter Frederica Sagor Maas
- The Farmer's Daughter (1940 film), with Martha Raye and Charles Ruggles
- The Farmer's Daughter (1947 film), starring Loretta Young and Joseph Cotten
- The Farmer's Daughter (1962 film), starring Charles Bickford, who was also in the 1947 film
- Farmer's Daughters, a 1973 hardcore pornography film

== Music ==
- Farmer's Daughter (band), Canadian country music band
- Farmer's Daughter (album), by Crystal Bowersox
  - "Farmer's Daughter" (Crystal Bowersox song), this album's title track
- "Farmer's Daughter" (Rodney Atkins song), 2011
- "Farmer's Daughter" (The Beach Boys song), 1963
- "The Farmer's Daughter", a song by the Australian music group The Cockroaches from their album Fingertips

== Other ==
- Farmer's Daughter (preserves), April McGregor's food business in Hillsborough, North Carolina
- The Farmer's Daughter (TV series), based on the 1947 film, featuring Inger Stevens and William Windom
- The Farmer's Daughters (GLOW wrestlers), former GLOW wrestlers stable
