= Dragonfly (Fleetwood Mac song) =

- German picture sleeve

Single by Fleetwood Mac
- B-side: "The Purple Dancer"
- Released: March 1971
- Recorded: Late 1970
- Genre: Blues rock, psychedelic rock
- Length: 2:42
- Label: Reprise (RS27010)
- Songwriters: Danny Kirwan, W. H. Davies

Fleetwood Mac singles chronology
"Jewel Eyed Judy" (1970)	"Dragonfly" (1971)	"Sands of Time" (1971)

"Dragonfly" is a song written by British rock musician Danny Kirwan with lyrics taken from a poem by Welsh poet W. H. Davies. It was originally recorded by Kirwan's band Fleetwood Mac in 1970, and became the first UK single released by the band after the departure of their frontman Peter Green. It was also their first single with Christine McVie as an official member of the group. By the time the song had been released, guitarist Jeremy Spencer had left the band.

== Recording ==
The lyrics to "Dragonfly" were taken from W. H. Davies' 1927 poem, "The Dragonfly", with some lines switched around and others omitted. The poem included an extra verse that does not feature in the song. Kirwan wrote the music for the song, sang and played guitar, accompanied by Mick Fleetwood on drums and John McVie on bass guitar.

The B-side of the single, "The Purple Dancer", was written by Kirwan, Fleetwood and John McVie, and featured vocals from both Kirwan and Jeremy Spencer. Both songs were recorded during the same session in late 1970. Spencer did not participate in the recording of "Dragonfly", but both songs were played at concerts during late 1970 and early 1971 and exist on bootleg recordings. "Dragonfly" was also recorded for the German TV show Beat-Club in 1971, after Spencer had left the band. New guitarist Bob Welch featured in the performance in Spencer's place.

"Dragonfly" was recorded after the release of Fleetwood Mac's Kiln House album in September 1970, and no songs from that album had been released as singles in the UK, although "Jewel Eyed Judy" was a single in the United States, Germany and the Netherlands, and "Tell Me All the Things You Do" had been released in France. "Dragonfly" was chosen as the band's next single in the UK, Germany and the Netherlands. Special picture sleeves were issued for the German and Dutch releases, but the British single had a plain Reprise sleeve.

The single failed to chart in any of the countries in which it was released, even in the Netherlands, where the previous single "Jewel Eyed Judy" had reached No. 2 on the Dutch Top 40's Bubbling Under chart. "Dragonfly"'s commercial failure added to the gloom within the band when they returned to Britain from America. Christine McVie later stated, "Over the last year, it seems as if we have just been battered and beaten about the head with a giant club."

"Dragonfly" subsequently did not feature on Fleetwood Mac's following album Future Games, although it did appear on a 1971 Greatest Hits collection.

The "Dragonfly" single with its original B-side, "The Purple Dancer", was released as a limited edition pressing of only 3000 copies on purple vinyl by Reprise Records for Record Store Day on 19 April 2014. Also released on blue vinyl, this release was the first time the song was ever available as a single in the US. It charted at No. 9 on the Hot Singles Sales chart in the US, the first time the song had charted anywhere.

== Reaction ==
Kirwan's former bandmate Peter Green said of "Dragonfly": "The best thing he ever wrote... that should have been a hit."

In his book, "The Complete Guide to the Music of Fleetwood Mac", Rikky Rooksby stated: "... wonderfully textured guitar playing. It has shimmering chords and the tune coming down in octaves... This is far and away the best thing which Kirwan ever wrote." In 2025, Mojo ranked the song number 12 on its list of the 30 greatest Fleetwood Mac songs.

== Personnel ==
- Danny Kirwan – guitar, vocals
- John McVie – bass guitar
- Mick Fleetwood – drums
- Jeremy Spencer – guitar, co-lead vocals (B-side only)
- Christine McVie – piano, backing vocals (B-side only)

== Charts ==
=== Weekly charts ===
Chart (2014–2015)	Peak position
UK Physical Singles Chart	31
UK Vinyl Singles Chart	37
