= Future Games =

Studio album by Fleetwood Mac
- Released: 3 September 1971
- Recorded: June–August 1971
- Studios: Advision, London
- Genres: Space rock; rock; folk rock; pop
- Length: 42:22
- Label: Reprise
- Producer: Fleetwood Mac

Fleetwood Mac chronology
| The Original Fleetwood Mac (1971) | Future Games (1971) | Greatest Hits (1971) |

Singles from Future Games
- 1. "Sands of Time" Released: 11 November 1971 (US)

Professional ratings
Review scores
| Source | Rating |
|---|---|
| Allmusic | 3.5/5 stars |
| Christgau's Record Guide | B |

Future Games is the fifth album by the British-American rock band Fleetwood Mac, released on 3 September 1971. It was recorded in the summer of 1971 at Advision Studios in London and was the first album to feature Christine McVie as a full member. This album was also the first of five albums to feature the American guitarist Bob Welch. "He was totally different background – R&B, sort of jazzy. He brought his personality," Mick Fleetwood said of Welch in a 1995 BBC interview, "He was a member of Fleetwood Mac before we'd even played a note."

The album sold poorly in the UK, and did not chart. In the US, it performed better than any previous Fleetwood Mac album. It peaked at number 91 on the US Billboard 200 chart dated 18 December 1971. The album was certified Gold by the Recording Industry Association of America (RIAA) in 2000.

== Background ==
After founder and original bandleader Peter Green departed Fleetwood Mac in May 1970, the remaining members recorded the album Kiln House, with bassist John McVie's wife Christine Perfect being a major collaborator during the sessions. She was soon promoted to full-time membership as the band's keyboardist, and began writing and singing her own material with them. While the band was touring the Kiln House album, guitarist and vocalist Jeremy Spencer abruptly quit the band in February 1971 to join the Children of God, a Christian new religious movement founded by David Berg. Fleetwood Mac held auditions for a replacement and eventually selected Bob Welch after hearing his demo tape.

Welch had been suggested by Judy Wong, who was the band's secretary. He was living in Paris at the time following the dissolution of his band Head West when he received a phone call from Wong to determine if he was interested in joining Fleetwood Mac. Welch met with Fleetwood at a local train station and was driven to the band's Benifold communal house. For the audition process, Welch stayed with the band for a few days where he socialised with them and played some of his songs. The band asked Welch to join after his third visit to Benifold. New Musical Express reported that Welch had joined Fleetwood Mac in April 1970. The band did some live performances with him in June and began work on Future Games that same month.

Without Spencer's Chicago blues and 1950s rock and roll leanings, the band moved further away from blues and closer to the melodic pop sound that would finally break them into America four years later. Christine McVie recalled in a 1988 interview that the band encountered difficulties in recording "Sands of Time", which she attributed to the structural complexity of the song and the expectation of playing it from start to finish without making any mistakes. She believed that "Kirwan was a real disciplinarian" and said that they were required to play these songs "perfectly". Welch's primary guitar at the time was a Gibson ES-345, which he played on the record along with a Fender Stratocaster.

After the band completed the album and submitted it to Reprise Records, the record label refused to release an album with only seven songs and demanded that they record an eighth. "What a Shame" was recorded hastily as a jam to fulfill this request.

== Track notes ==
There is an early version of "Morning Rain" with the title "Start Again", as recorded in a BBC session on 5 January 1971. "What a Shame" featured saxophone from Christine McVie's brother John Perfect whose son Dan later co-produced and featured as guitarist/co-writer on McVie's 2004 album In the Meantime. Perfect also played some uncredited harmonica on "Lay It All Down".

The title track, written by then-newcomer Bob Welch, was later re-recorded for his 1979 solo album The Other One and again for His Fleetwood Mac Years & Beyond in 2003. The original version is featured in the 2000 movie Almost Famous.

Four of the eight tracks were written or co-written by guitarist and vocalist Danny Kirwan. A heavily edited version of "Sands of Time" (b/w "Lay It All Down") was an unsuccessful single in the United States and some other territories. An alternate version of "Lay It All Down" appeared on the 1992 compilation 25 Years – The Chain. The single edit of "Sands of Time" was released on the deluxe edition of the 50 Years – Don't Stop compilation in 2018 and later as a bonus track on the 2020 remastered Future Games from the 1969-1974 box set. Also included on the remastered Future Games from this box set were alternate versions of "Sometimes" and "Show Me a Smile", a much longer alternate version of "Lay It All Down", the full jam of "What a Shame" which included vocals, plus an acoustic demo of another Welch song, "Stone".

== Artwork ==
The image on the front cover was photographed by Mick Fleetwood's sister, Sally. On the back are individual shots of the band members, with the exception of John McVie, who instead opted to replace his headshot with one of his photographs of a penguin from the London Zoo, which he visited on a near-daily basis. Fleetwood Mac would incorporate the penguin mascot in several of their future releases. Early UK and American releases of this album, along with some other country's issues, have a yellow background to the picture of the two children and cover text. All subsequent releases have a green background. The 2013 vinyl reissue by Warner/Rhino available in the Fleetwood Mac: 1969 to 1972 4-LP box set restores the original yellow background to the album artwork, and it was released as a standalone LP two years later. The 1969-1974 CD box set also restores the original yellow background to the album artwork.

== Release and reception ==
Melody Maker announced a release date of August 27 in its 31 July 1971 edition of the publication. It was instead released the following week on September 3. In its September 11 edition of Record World, Ron McCreight selected Future Games as the album pick of the week. Future Games debuted at number 186 on the US Billboard 200 chart dated 30 October 1971. The album reached its peak at number 91 on the chart dated 18 December 1971, after being on the chart for eight weeks. The album ultimately spent a total of 12 weeks on the chart. On 4 October 2000, the album was certified gold by the Recording Industry Association of America (RIAA) for sales of over 500,000 copies in the United States.

Cashbox praised all eight tracks on Future Games and commented that the album possessed more of a "soft and more harmonic" sound than some of Fleetwood Mac's previous work. Billboard complimented the production and musicianship on Future Games and predicted that "What a Shame" and "Lay It All Down" would receive airplay on "heavy" underground radio stations.

== Track listing ==
Side one
| No. | Title | Writer(s) | Lead vocals | Length |
|---|---|---|---|---|
| 1. | "Woman of 1000 Years" | Danny Kirwan | Kirwan | 5:28 |
| 2. | "Morning Rain" | Christine McVie | C. McVie | 5:38 |
| 3. | "What a Shame" | Bob Welch, Mick Fleetwood, Kirwan, John McVie, C. McVie | instrumental | 2:20 |
| 4. | "Future Games" | Welch | Welch | 8:18 |

Side two
| No. | Title | Writer(s) | Lead vocals | Length |
|---|---|---|---|---|
| 1. | "Sands of Time" | Kirwan | Kirwan | 7:23 |
| 2. | "Sometimes" | Kirwan | Kirwan | 5:26 |
| 3. | "Lay It All Down" | Welch | Welch | 4:30 |
| 4. | "Show Me a Smile" | C. McVie | C. McVie | 3:21 |

2020 Remastered bonus tracks
| No. | Title | Writer(s) | Lead vocals | Length |
|---|---|---|---|---|
| 9. | "Sands of Time" (Single Version) | Kirwan | Kirwan | 3:04 |
| 10. | "Sometimes" (Alternate Version) | Kirwan | Kirwan | 5:25 |
| 11. | "Lay It All Down" (Alternate Version) | Welch | Welch | 8:18 |
| 12. | "Stone" | Welch | Welch | 2:30 |
| 13. | "Show Me a Smile" (Alternate Version) | C. McVie | C. McVie | 3:23 |
| 14. | "What a Shame" (Unedited) | Welch, Kirwan, C. McVie, J. McVie, Fleetwood | Kirwan, Welch | 8:28 |

Notes: The song timings listed here are not as indicated on all LPs/CDs, since some of the timings on some releases are inaccurate. On some versions of the album (depending on the country of issue), the notes state that the track "Woman of 1000 Years" runs for 8:20, when in fact it runs for 5:28. Similarly, "Morning Rain" is listed as 6:22 and runs for 5:38, while the track "Sometimes" is listed to run for 6:25 and only runs for 5:26.

The opening track was titled "Woman of 1000 Years" on original UK, European and Japanese vinyl pressings, and original cassettes, 8-track cartridges and CD releases in the US, Japan and Europe. It was shown as "Woman of a Thousand Years" on vinyl pressings in the US, Canada, Australia and New Zealand, some European vinyl reissues, as well as later CD releases. Some vinyl releases differed between record sleeve and label.

== Personnel ==
Fleetwood Mac

- Danny Kirwan – guitar, vocals
- Bob Welch – guitar, vocals
- Christine McVie – piano, vocals
- John McVie – bass guitar
- Mick Fleetwood – drums

Additional personnel

- John Perfect – saxophone on "What a Shame", harmonica on "Lay It All Down"

Production

- Producer: Fleetwood Mac
- Engineer: Martin Rushent
- Studio: Advision
- Sleeve design: John Pasche
- Cover photo by Sally Jesse
- Group photos by Edmund Shea

== Charts ==
| Chart (1971) | Peak position |
|---|---|
| US Billboard 200 | 91 |

== Certifications ==
| Region | Certification | Certified units/sales |
|---|---|---|
| United States (RIAA) | Gold | 500,000^{^} |
^{^} Shipments figures based on certification alone.

== Bibliography ==
- Bob Brunning, Fleetwood Mac: The First 30 Years, Omnibus Press, London, 1998, ISBN 978-0-71196-907-0
- Roy Carr & Steve Clarke, Fleetwood Mac: Rumours n' Fax, Harmony Books, New York, 1978, ISBN 0-517-53364-2
- Mike Evans, Fleetwood Mac: The Definitive History, Sterling, New York, 2011, ISBN 978-1-4027-8630-3
- Olivier Roubin & Romuald Ollivier, Fleetwood Mac: All The Songs, Black Dog Leventhal Publishers, New York, 2025, ISBN 978-0-7624-8630-4
