= Fleetwood Mac: Opus Collection =

Opus Collection

Compilation album by Fleetwood Mac
- Released: 3 September 2013
- Genre: Rock; pop rock; pop; adult contemporary; blues rock
- Length: 55:59
- Label: Warner Bros. Music; Rhino Custom Products

Fleetwood Mac chronology
Extended Play (2013)	Opus Collection (2013)	50 Years – Don't Stop (2018)

Opus Collection is a Starbucks exclusive compilation album by the British-American rock band Fleetwood Mac. The album has liner notes written by David Wild. It peaked at number 72 on the Billboard 200, which gave the band their 27th album chart entry.

== Reception ==
Professional ratings
Review scores
Source	Rating
AllMusic	4/5 stars
Uncut	3/5 stars

In a review from AllMusic, music critic Stephen Thomas Erlewine wrote that it "is a 15-track collection of highlights from Fleetwood Mac's classic years" and that "the overall effect is to ever so slightly emphasize Stevie Nicks and Christine McVie over Lindsey Buckingham". He said that "this may not precisely reflect the division of labor in the band, but it does make for a very nice, adult contemporary-leaning collection that will sure satisfy consumers who pick it up in Starbucks."

== Track listing ==
No.	Title	Length
1.	"You Make Loving Fun"	3:34
2.	"Go Your Own Way"	3:41
3.	"Gypsy"	4:23
4.	"Sara"	6:28
5.	"World Turning"	4:23
6.	"Tusk"	3:37
7.	"Rhiannon"	4:12
8.	"Dreams"	4:18
9.	"Everywhere"	3:43
10.	"Little Lies"	3:39
11.	"Oh Diane"	2:36
12.	"Never Going Back Again"	2:14
13.	"Honey Hi"	2:42
14.	"Landslide"	3:18
15.	"Planets of the Universe (Demo)"	3:18
Total length:		55:59

== Charts ==
Weekly chart performance for Opus Collection
Chart (2013)	Peak position
US Billboard 200	72
US Independent Albums (Billboard)	12
US Top Rock Albums (Billboard)	22
