= Sad Angel =

Single by Fleetwood Mac

from the album Extended Play
- Released: April 2013
- Recorded: 2013
- Genre: Rock
- Length: 4:03
- Label: LMJS Productions
- Songwriter: Lindsey Buckingham
- Producers: Lindsey Buckingham, Mitchell Froom

Fleetwood Mac singles chronology
"Say You Will" (2003)	"Sad Angel" (2013)

'Sad Angel' is a song by Fleetwood Mac, written by guitarist and vocalist Lindsey Buckingham, from their EP Extended Play, released in 2013.

== Background ==
The band intended to release "Sad Angel" and another Buckingham song, "Miss Fantasy", before their 2013 world tour. The band instead included both of these songs on a four song EP titled Extended Play along with "It Takes Time" and "Without You".

Buckingham wrote "Sad Angel" for his former girlfriend Stevie Nicks. "All these years later, we are still writing songs that are dialogues for each other," he says. "That was part of the appeal of Rumours, and of the group in general... Of all the things we cut, "Sad Angel" was, for lack of a better term, the most Fleetwood Mac-y. It was really kind of the best stuff that we have done in a while."

"Sad Angel" was performed on Fleetwood Mac's 2013 world tour to coincide with the release of Extended Play. In 2018, "Sad Angel" was included on their compilation album, 50 Years – Don't Stop.

== Reception ==
Dave Lifton of Ultimate Classic Rock gave the song a 7/10. While praising the rhythm section of Mick Fleetwood and John McVie, Lifton felt that Stevie Nicks' vocals were lacking, with her trademark personality absent. "...For a band that has traded so frequently on the duo's history together, "Sad Angel" doesn't offer much in the way of tension between its two lead singers." Writing for The Los Angeles Times, Mikael Wood said that the song's "glossy textures" were reminiscent of the band's output on Tango in the Night. The Guardian ranked the song number 28 on its list of the 30 greatest Fleetwood Mac songs.

== Personnel ==
- Mick Fleetwood – drums, percussion
- John McVie – bass guitar
- Lindsey Buckingham – acoustic guitar, electric guitar, keyboards, lead vocals
- Stevie Nicks – backing vocals

== Charts ==
Chart (2013)	Peak position
UK Official Singles Chart	125
