= Flee (album) =

Studio album by the Jeremy Spencer Band
- Released: June 1979
- Genres: Soft rock, disco
- Label: Atlantic
- Producers: Jeremy Spencer, Michael Fogarty

The Jeremy Spencer Band chronology
Jeremy Spencer and the Children (1972)	Flee (1979)	Precious Little (2006)

Flee is an album by British blues rock musician Jeremy Spencer, credited to the Jeremy Spencer Band. Spencer had been a member of Fleetwood Mac from 1967 to 1971, and this 1979 release was Spencer's third album apart from Fleetwood Mac, and his second recorded while a member of the Children of God.

== Background ==
Spencer was living in Italy in 1977, and had begun to write new songs and work towards forming a new band. He was joined there by Michael Fogarty, whom Spencer considered the perfect partner for his new musical venture, the two having met in the UK in 1975. Fogarty was born in Tennessee in 1951, and had spent the previous ten years playing in a number of soul and country groups.

This was Spencer's first recorded work in seven years, and was musically far removed from his previous work. It showed his continuing preference for parodying other bands; in this case the songs on side two bear a strong resemblance to the contemporary sound of Fleetwood Mac, i.e. a Californian rock style with female vocalists, and a solid drum sound reminiscent of Mick Fleetwood.

Promotional advert for Flee featuring uncredited vocalist Jeanne Hendricks.

Spencer and Fogarty sang on several tracks, but for the hit single "Cool Breeze", the lead vocal was taken by Jeanne Hendricks. Hendricks performed on a number of tracks, and was featured in the album photographs, but was not credited as a vocalist. She also sang with Spencer on the follow-up single, "Travellin'".

The album features a heavy disco production treatment given to the songs on side one, which Spencer was very unhappy with. "Sunshine" was a reworking of "When I Looked to See the Sunshine" from the Jeremy Spencer and the Children album of 1972.

"Cool Breeze" and "Travellin'" were issued as singles in various territories, and "Cool Breeze" charted at Number 21 on the U.S. Billboard Adult Contemporary Charts, although the album was not a commercial success.

"Flee" was reworked by Spencer as "Refugees" for his 2012 album Bend in the Road.

== Critical reception ==
Professional ratings
Review scores
Source	Rating
AllMusic	2.5/5 stars

The Globe and Mail wrote that "Spencer's major problem with Flee is that he can't decide what he wants the album to be—a hot-shot disco pulser or a throw-back to his Fleetwood Mac days."

In 2020, PopMatters praised the title track but called the rest of the album "straight-laced, overproduced disco-pop dross."

== Track listing ==
Side one:

1. "Deeper" (David Rugely)
2. "Sunshine" (Jeremy Spencer)
3. "Love Our Way Outta Here" (Michael Fogarty)

Side two:

1. "Flee" (Spencer, Fogarty)
2. "Cool Breeze" (Fogarty, Spencer)
3. "You've Got the Right" (Fogarty, Spencer)
4. "Travellin'" (Fogarty, Spencer)

== Personnel ==
- Jeremy Spencer – vocals, guitar
- Michael Fogarty – keyboards, vocals
- Jeanne Hendricks – vocals on side 2, lead vocal on "Cool Breeze"
- Jeff Schoen – keyboards
- Neil Jason – bass guitar
- Al Izzo – drums
- Buzz Buchanan – drums
- Victor "Coco" Salazar – percussion
- "The Songbirds" – backing vocals on side 1

Production

- Produced by Jeremy Spencer and Michael Fogarty
- Executive producer – Ahmet Ertegün
- Tracks 1–3 produced in association with Silvio Tancredi and Israel Sanchez, mixed with the use of the Aphex Aural Exciter
- Tracks 1–3 arranged by Armando Noriega with vocal concepts by Phil Anastasi
- Tracks 4–7 arranged by Jeremy Spencer and Michael Fogarty
