= Sands of Time (song) =

Single by Fleetwood Mac

from the album Future Games
- B-side: "Lay it All Down"
- Released: 10 November 1971
- Recorded: June–August 1971
- Studio: Advision, London
- Length: 7:23 (full album version); 3:03 (single edit)
- Label: Reprise
- Songwriter: Danny Kirwan

Fleetwood Mac singles chronology
"Dragonfly" (1971)	"Sands of Time" (1971)	"Sentimental Lady" (1972)

Audio video
- "Sands of Time" on YouTube

"Sands of Time" is a song written by Danny Kirwan. It was included on Fleetwood Mac's fifth studio album, Future Games, in 1971. The band's record label selected the song to be released as the album's lead single in the United States. Whereas the album version was over seven minutes in duration, the single was pared down to three minutes and backed with "Lay It All Down" as its B-side.

== Background ==
The song opens with the establishment of the main guitar riff, which is built around a series of arpeggios that alternate between G major and E minor. An additional guitar provides a counterpoint melody and is treated with a slow attack envelope. The song's intro adheres to the conventions of folk-rock music and later transitions into a more upbeat section with jazzier undertones. This faster section is played in a different metre and features cymbal fills played by Mick Fleetwood.

In a 1988 interview, Christine McVie described "Sands of Time" as a complex song that was difficult to record; the band had to run through the song from start to finish without making any mistakes. Following Kirwan's death in 2018, McVie identified "Sands of Time" as a "killer song" along with "Woman of 1000 Years", which was also from the Future Games album.

"Sands of Time" has appeared on a few Fleetwood Mac compilation albums, starting with 50 Years – Don't Stop, where it appeared in its single-edit form. The album version and the single edit appeared on the 2020 Fleetwood Mac: 1969 to 1974 box set. In 2024, it was included on the Best of Fleetwood Mac 1969-1974 compilation, which showcased 19 songs from seven Fleetwood Mac albums beginning with Then Play On and ending with Heroes Are Hard to Find.

== Critical reception ==
Billboard highlighted "Sands of Time" in its "Special Merit Spotlight" section of the publication and characterised it as "a smooth rock ballad that offers much for top 40, FM and the charts. In their review of Future Games, Joe Tiller of Dig! said that the "introspective" lyrics on "Sands of Time" demonstrated that Kirwan was "a more sophisticated lyricist than he's given credit for, especially considering his age at the time."

Richie Unterberger wrote in his book, Fleetwood Mac: The Complete Illustrated History, that the song was a "perfect example of the new keyboard-driven Fleetwood Mac sound". In their book, Fleetwood Mac: Rumours n' Fax, Roy Carr and Steve Clarke stated that the song was an unusual choice for a single and resembled some of the music from The Byrds. They found the song to be "remotely pleasant" but were critical of Kirwan's "frail" vocals and "mundane" guitar riff that failed to deliver a "strong hook".

== Track listing ==
- US vinyl (Reprise)
1. "Sands of Time" – 3:00
2. "Lay It All Down" – 4:32

== Personnel ==
- Danny Kirwan – guitar, vocals
- Bob Welch – guitar
- Christine McVie – keyboards
- John McVie – bass guitar
- Mick Fleetwood – drums
