= Precious Little =

Studio album by Jeremy Spencer
- Released: 18 July 2006
- Recorded: 2005, during the Notodden Blues Festival, Juke Joint Studio
- Genre: Blues
- Label: Bluestown Records, Blind Pig Records
- Producer: Kjetil Draugedalen & Gaute Fredriksen

Jeremy Spencer chronology
Flee (1979)	Precious Little (2006)	Bend in the Road (2012)

Professional ratings
Review scores
Source	Rating
Allmusic	4/5 stars
ARTISTdirect	4/5 stars

Precious Little is an album by British blues musician Jeremy Spencer, who was a member of Fleetwood Mac from 1967 to 1971. Released on 18 July 2006, this is his fourth official solo album (his first since 1979) and was released on the Bluestown Records label in Norway, though Bluestown Records later licensed it to Blind Pig Records. The album was recorded over five days in 2005 in at the Juke Joint Studio during the Notodden Blues Festival on an analog 24-track machine.

Local musicians were used to back Spencer on all tracks, because he believed that "they have retained the 'purity' of the old blues in their playing". Most of the tracks were self-penned, with the addition of covers of songs by Elmore James and Slim Rhodes.

The album was produced by Kjetil Draugedalen and Gaute Fredriksen, and the executive producer was Jostein Forsberg. It was mixed at the Supermono Studio, Oslo, and was mastered by Audun Strype at Strype Audio, Oslo.

== Track listing ==
1. "Bitter Lemon" (Jeremy Spencer) – 4:03
2. "Psychic Waste" (Spencer, J. Phoenix) – 4:19
3. "It Hurts Me Too" (Elmore James) – 4:49
4. "Please Don't Stop" (Gordon Galbraith) – 2:47
5. "Serene Serena" (Trad. arr. Spencer) – 4:43
6. "Dr. J" (Spencer) – 3:55
7. "Bleeding Heart" (James) – 4:47
8. "Many Sparrows" (Spencer) – 2:21
9. "Trouble and Woe" (Spencer) – 4:18
10. "Maria de Santiago" (Spencer) – 3:55
11. "Take and Give" (Ronnie Hesselbein, Slim Rhodes) – 2:21
12. "Precious Little" (Spencer) – 4:29

== Personnel ==
- Jeremy Spencer – vocals, harmony vocals, slide guitar, resonator
- Trond Ytterbø – harmonica, mandolin, harmony vocals
- Rune Endal – bass guitar, double bass
- Runar Boyesen – keyboards
- Anders Viken – drums, percussion
- Espen Liland – guitar, graphic design
- Svenn Åge Frydenberg – trumpet
- Leif Winther – saxophone
- Marianne Tovsrud Knutsen – harmony vocals
- Margit Bakken – harmony vocals
- Roger Arntzen – additional bass guitar on "Many Sparrows"
- Kjetil Draugedalen – producer, engineer, mixing
- Jostein Forsberg – executive producer
- Gaute Fredriksen – producer, engineer, mixing
- Morten Gjerde – photography
- Audun Strype – mastering

Recorded at Juke Joint Studio, Notodden, Norway

== Release information ==
- Bluestown Records (Norway) – BTR 1017 (CD)
