= Tell Me All the Things You Do =

Song by Fleetwood Mac

from the album Kiln House
- B-side: "This Is the Rock"
- Released: 1970
- Recorded: 1970
- Studio: De Lane Lea, London
- Length: 4:10
- Label: Reprise
- Songwriters: Danny Kirwan; Jeremy Spencer; John McVie
- Producer: Fleetwood Mac

"Tell Me All the Things You Do" is a song by the British rock group Fleetwood Mac. It was written by Danny Kirwan and was the ninth track on their 1970 Kiln House album. In France and the Netherlands, the song was also released as a single, with "This Is the Rock" serving as its B-side.

== Background ==
"Tell Me All the Things You Do" is largely an instrumental composition with minimal lyrics. The lyrics primarily consist of the song's title; some personal pronouns were swapped in on a few lines. Mick Fleetwood said in an interview that Kirwan "was a producer of music. He never really felt comfortable singing anything."

Jeremy Spencer recorded the electric piano part on a Wurlitzer and sought to emulate the style of Ray Charles, although he was dissatisfied with the final result. The song's rhythm section consisted of John McVie on bass and Fleetwood on drums and percussion, including some cowbell hits during certain passages. Distortion and wah-wah effects were applied to the guitars, which supplied the main riff and solos. Fleetwood Mac played the song live starting in the early 70s; the band also performed the song for a few shows in 1977. A live recording from when Spencer was still in the band appeared on the Madison Blues album.

The band did not perform the song again until their An Evening with Fleetwood Mac Tour in 2018–2019. Mike Campbell, who joined the band in 2018 as one of the replacements for Lindsey Buckingham, had suggested the song's inclusion in the setlist. Fleetwood Mac continued to perform the song through 2019, but they dropped it from the set later in the tour in part due to the audience's general unfamiliarity with the song.

== Critical reception ==
In his review of Kiln House, J.R. Young wrote in Rolling Stone that listeners who purchased the album would "find [themselves] humming 'Tell Me All the Things You Do' for the next few months." Along with "Station Man", Beat Instrumental cited "Tell Me All The Things You Do" as a successful demonstration of the band's "multi-guitar work". Nick Logan of NME labelled "Tell Me All The Things You Do " as Kirwan's best song on the album. He observed that elements of Kirwan's playing resembled the work of Peter Green and also thought that Kirwan's guitar work on the song was "distinctive" and "unmistakably his own".

Alexis Petridis of The Guardian felt that the song "pack[ed] enough muscular riffs into four minutes" and demonstrated the band's ability to emulate band's like Led Zeppelin. Bruce Eder described the song as "hard-rocking" in his Kiln House review for AllMusic. In Mojo, Mark Blake characterised "Tell Me All the Things You Do" as a "great cheery Kirwan track [that] shone through" and said that it was a "brisk guitar groover embellished by uncredited new recruit Christine McVie's piano."

== Track listing ==
1. "Tell Me All The Things You Do" – 4:10
2. "This is the Rock" – 2:45

== Personnel ==
- Mick Fleetwood – drums, cowbell, congas
- John McVie – bass guitar
- Jeremy Spencer – electric guitar, electric piano
- Danny Kirwan – electric guitar, vocals
