= Heroes Are Hard to Find (song) =

1974 song by Fleetwood Mac

Single by Fleetwood Mac

from the album Heroes Are Hard to Find
- B-side: "Born Enchanter"
- Released: 20 November 1974 (US); 7 February 1975 (UK)
- Recorded: 1974
- Length: 3:35 (album version) 2:46 (single version)
- Label: Reprise K 14403
- Songwriter: Christine McVie
- Producers: Fleetwood Mac, Bob Hughes

Fleetwood Mac singles chronology
"For Your Love" (1973)	"Heroes Are Hard to Find" (1974)	"Warm Ways" (1975)

"Heroes Are Hard to Find" is a 1974 song performed by Fleetwood Mac written by British keyboardist Christine McVie. It is the opening song to the 1974 album of the same name. The song was released as the album's lead single but failed to chart. "Heroes Are Hard to Find" has appeared on several Fleetwood Mac compilation albums, including 25 Years – The Chain (1992), 50 Years – Don't Stop (2018), and Best of 1969–1974 (2024).

== Background ==
Nick De Caro, who worked as a record producer and arranger for A&M Records, wrote the song's brass arrangements. Christine McVie also augmented the arrangement with an ARP String Ensemble at the end of the composition. Bob Welch, who was the band's guitarist during the recording of Heroes Are Hard to Find, said in a 1999 Q&A that he was surprised that the title track did not achieve commercial success; he also shared this sentiment about McVie's other songs on Heroes Are Hard to Find.

== Critical reception ==
"Heroes Are Hard to Find" generally received positive reviews from music critics. In his review of the album, Ken Barnes of Rolling Stone described the title track as "intriguing". Billboard labeled the title track as one of the strongest songs on the album. Cash Box said that the "tight sweet harmonies" on the title track "back (Christine McVie) up with some excellent instrumentation". Record World anticipated that the "funkified titled tune" would receive airplay on FM radio.

In a retrospective review, Hal Horowitz of AllMusic thought that the song was a "blatant but failed attempt at a hit single". He also highlighted the song's "aggressive" arrangement centered around brass instruments.

== Track listing ==
=== 7" single ===
1. "Heroes Are Hard to Find (Single Edit)" – 2:46
2. "Born Enchanter" – 2:54

== Personnel ==
- Christine McVie – keyboards, lead vocals
- Bob Welch – guitar, backing vocals
- John McVie – bass
- Mick Fleetwood – drums, percussion
- Nick De Caro – horn arrangements
