= Bend in the Road =

Studio album by Jeremy Spencer
- Released: 21 April 2012 (LP); 28 August 2012 (CD)
- Recorded: 2010 in Ferndale, Michigan, US
- Genre: Blues
- Label: Propelz Records
- Producer: Jeremy Spencer and Brett Lucas

Jeremy Spencer chronology
| Precious Little (2006) | Bend in the Road (2012) | Coventry Blue (2014) |

Alternative cover
- Cover of the CD release

Bend in the Road is an album by British blues musician Jeremy Spencer, who was a member of Fleetwood Mac from 1967 to 1971. It is his fifth official solo album and was released on the Propelz Records label on 21 April 2012, to coincide with Record Store Day.

== Recording ==
Spencer continued his tradition of recording songs by Elmore James and Homesick James, and also took inspiration from poetry and passages from the Bible. Some of Spencer's songs were written during his time with Fleetwood Mac, while some others dated from the 1970s and 1980s. The track "Refugees" is a re-working of "Flee", from Spencer's 1979 album of the same name.

The album was recorded during the first half of 2010, at Tempermill Studio in Ferndale, Michigan. For his backing band, Spencer used a new group of Detroit-based musicians: guitarist Brett Lucas, bass guitarist James Simonson and drummer Todd Glass. Together, the trio have formed their own band called Saint Cecilia, and they also released their own self-titled album in 2012.

== Release information ==
Bend in the Road was first released as a double vinyl LP in the US (limited to 2000 copies), with a CD release following on 28 August. The LP features a cover painted by Spencer himself, whereas the CD uses a photo. The track listings are also slightly different, with four tracks exclusive to the LP, and one exclusive to the CD.

== Track listing ==
- All tracks composed by Jeremy Spencer unless otherwise stated:

=== Vinyl ===
==== Disc 1 Side A ====
1. "Homesick" (Homesick James) – 3:52
2. "Cry for Me Baby (Mel London) – 4:02
3. "Whispering Fields" – 3:19
4. "I Walked a Mile with Sorrow" (Spencer, Robert Browning) – 4:18
5. "Earthquake" – 3:25

==== Disc 1 Side B ====
1. "Aphrodite" – 4:01
2. "Secret Sorrow" – 3:57
3. "Jambo" – 4:02
4. "The Sun Is Shining" (Elmore James) – 6:15

==== Disc 2 Side A ====
1. "Stranger Blues" (E. James, Bobby Robinson) – 6:04
2. "Strange Woman" – 4:42
3. "Blind Lover" (Spencer, Brett Lucas) – 5:20
4. "Desired Haven" – 4:02

==== Disc 2 Side B ====
1. "Come to Me" – 3:38
2. "Merciful Sea" – 4:31
3. "Refugees" – 5:45
4. "Bend in the Road" – 5:08

=== CD ===
1. "Homesick"
2. "Cry for Me Baby"
3. "Whispering Fields"
4. "I Walked a Mile with Sorrow"
5. "Earthquake"
6. "Aphrodite"
7. "Secret Sorrow"
8. "Stranger Blues"
9. "Homework" (Dave Clark, Al Perkins, Otis Rush)
10. "Desired Haven"
11. "Come to Me"
12. "Merciful Sea"
13. "Refugees"
14. "Bend in the Road"

== Personnel ==
- Jeremy Spencer – vocals, slide guitar, resonator guitar, acoustic guitar, piano, organ
- Brett Lucas – electric guitar, resonator and acoustic guitar, twelve-string guitar, string arrangements, backing vocals
- James Simonson – bass guitar, upright bass
- Todd Glass – drums, percussion
- Rachel May – backing vocals
- Molly Hughes – violin
- Mimi Morris, Stefan Koch – cello
- Duncan McMillan – accordion
- Produced by Jeremy Spencer and Brett Lucas
- Engineered and mastered by Jim Kissling
- Mixed by Jim Kissling, Brett Lucas and Jeremy Spencer
