= Jeremy Spencer and the Children =

Studio album by Jeremy Spencer and the Children
- Released: 8 November 1972
- Genre: Rock
- Length: 37:22
- Label: CBS Records
- Producer: Jeremy Spencer

Jeremy Spencer and the Children chronology
Jeremy Spencer (1970)	Jeremy Spencer and the Children (1972)	Flee (1979)

Jeremy Spencer and the Children is an album by British blues rock musician Jeremy Spencer, who was a member of Fleetwood Mac from 1967 to 1971. Released in 1972, this is his second solo album although it was credited to Jeremy Spencer and the Children, referring to his band made up of members of the Children of God (Family International) organisation.

After leaving Fleetwood Mac while on tour in the United States in February 1971, Spencer joined the Children of God and has remained with the organisation ever since. The band toured in the US and released a single "Can You Hear the Song" / "The World in Her Heart" to accompany this album. The lyrics were heavily religious, with references to the love of God, finding purpose in life within Christianity, along with anti-war themes and apocalypticism.

Although this was the first recording for which Spencer dropped his mimicry and parody of 1950s music and Elmore James blues tunes, he nevertheless continued to show his talent for drawing inspiration from other styles of music. Influences from many contemporary sources can be heard, such as The Byrds, The Beatles, Jefferson Airplane and Creedence Clearwater Revival.

Spencer has often stated in interviews that he was unhappy with the poor production quality on the album, once declaring, "It was just like mud." It has never been released on CD, and Spencer has said that the master recordings were lost in a fire many years ago, but recently he expressed an interest in reworking some of the songs.

== Track listing ==
All tracks composed by Jeremy Spencer; except where noted.

1. "Can You Hear the Song" – 2:58
2. "The World in Her Heart" – 3:12
3. "Joan of Arc" (Spencer, David Senek) – 3:50
4. "The Prophet" – 3:25
5. "When I Looked to See the Sunshine" – 4:35
6. "Let's Get on the Ball" – 4:27
7. "Someone Told Me" (Spencer, Senek) – 3:40
8. "Beauty for Ashes" (Spencer, Senek) – 2:54
9. "War Horse" (Spencer, Senek) – 6:04
10. "I Believe in Jesus" – 2:21

== Personnel ==
- Jeremy Spencer – vocals, slide guitar, piano
- Michael – harmonica, guitar, vocals
- Phil Ham – lead guitar, flute, sitar
- Moriah – vocals, tambourine
- Boaz – bass guitar, vocals, recorder
- Ginnethon – drums, congas, timpani, tablas

== Production ==
- Produced by Jeremy Spencer
- Tracking engineer – Nick Koumoutseas
- Mixing engineer – John Nagy
- Faux engineer – Stuart Love
