= Jewel Eyed Judy =

1971 single by Fleetwood Mac

- Cover of the Dutch release: L–R: Spencer, Christine McVie, John McVie, Kirwan, Fleetwood

Single by Fleetwood Mac

from the album Kiln House
- B-side: "Station Man"
- Released: 6 January 1971 (US)
- Genre: Rock
- Length: 3:17
- Label: Reprise
- Songwriters: Danny Kirwan; John McVie; Mick Fleetwood
- Producer: Fleetwood Mac

Fleetwood Mac singles chronology
"The Green Manalishi (With the Two Prong Crown)" (1970)	"Jewel Eyed Judy" (1971)	"Dragonfly" (1971)

"Jewel Eyed Judy" is a song by British rock group Fleetwood Mac from their 1970 Kiln House album. The song was sung and co-written by Danny Kirwan. In early 1971, "Jewel Eyed Judy" was released as a single in certain countries, but not in their home country of the UK. The single failed to chart in the US and peaked just outside the top 40 in the Netherlands.

== Background ==
Although credited to John McVie, Mick Fleetwood, and Danny Kirwan, Mick Fleetwood stated in his 2014 autobiography, Play On, that his wife Jenny Boyd and Christine McVie wrote the lyrics together when Boyd was four months pregnant. Boyd also wrote the lyrics to "The Purple Dancer", which was used as the B-side to "Dragonfly", a non-album single released in 1971. Boyd said that the band's manager was responsible for assigning the writing credit to Fleetwood instead her, which left her disappointed. The lyrics include synonyms for light reflection, including "shine", "gleam", "sparkle", and "gleam", which are used to juxtapose with the titular jewel eyes metaphor.

Judy Wong, the band's secretary, was the subject of "Jewel Eyed Judy". Wong was responsible for compiling programs from the band's tours and was also instrumental in introducing Fleetwood Mac to Bob Welch, who joined the band in 1971 for their Future Games album. The verses are built around guitar arpeggios and licks, which become heavier and more saturated during the choruses, which also feature a couple of electric piano glissandos. Kirwan's vocals were also double tracked, with certain phrases employing the use of vibrato.

Billboard predicted that the song would reach the top 60 of the Billboard Hot 100, having received airplay on FM radio stations prior to its official release. The song missed the Hot 100, although it reached the bubbling under portion of the Dutch Top 40.

== Critical reception ==
In his review of Kiln House, Nick Logan of NME described "Jewel Eyed Judy" as a "pretty, melodic song" that was "marred by the low key vocals" that he felt were buried under some of the instrumentation. Cashbox characterised "Jewel Eyed Judy" as "fine FM material that could turn up on top forty lists" and thought that the song's "high and low extremes" provided it with an "unusual appeal". Record World said that "Jewel Eyed Judy" was a "haunting heavy single worth getting into." Billboard praised the song's "strong" vocal delivery and believed that it possessed the same commercial viability as the band's previous single "Oh Well", which had charted in the United States a few months prior.

Richie Uthenberger wrote that the song "showed the band moving in more of a pop direction than anything they’d previously cut, without sacrificing Kirwan's hard rock guitar licks." Bruce Eder of AllMusic echoed those sentiments and called the song a "superb" showcase of Kirwan's vocals and guitar playing. Dave Swanson of Ultimate Classic Rock called the song a "gritty, stomping rocker that has more in common with the likes of Badfinger than it does with much of the '50s motif found throughout the LP."

== Personnel ==
- Danny Kirwan – vocals, guitar
- Jeremy Spencer – guitar, electric piano
- Mick Fleetwood – drums
- John McVie – bass guitar

== Chart performance ==
Chart (1971)	Peak position
Netherlands (Dutch Top 40 Tipparade)	2
