= As Long as You Follow =

1988 single by Fleetwood Mac

Single by Fleetwood Mac

from the album Greatest Hits
- B-side: "Oh Well" (live); "Gold Dust Woman"
- Released: 28 November 1988 (UK)
- Length: 4:05
- Label: Warner Bros.
- Songwriters: Christine McVie; Eddy Quintela
- Producer: Greg Ladanyi

Fleetwood Mac UK singles chronology
"Isn't It Midnight" (1988)	"As Long as You Follow" (1988)	"Hold Me" (1989)

Fleetwood Mac US singles chronology
"Family Man" (1988)	"As Long as You Follow" (1988)	"No Questions Asked" (1988)

"As Long as You Follow" is a song by British-American rock band Fleetwood Mac. Performed by Christine McVie and written alongside her then-husband, Eddy Quintela, it was released on 28 November 1988 as the lead single from the band's 1988 greatest hits album. It was one of two new tracks recorded for the album, along with "No Questions Asked". Lead guitarist Rick Vito singled out the guitar solo on "As Long as You Follow" as his best work with Fleetwood Mac.

== Release ==
In an interview with Music Connection, McVie characterised "As Long as You Follow" as "yet another love song. It's just something which I relate to, have always related to – telling different stories about relationships."

A music video for "As Long as You Follow" was directed by Dominic Sena and filmed in Los Angeles. The music video features members of the band miming their parts, with Nicks singing her parts on the arm of a sofa. During the filming of the music video, Sena was panning the camera from McVie to Nicks when he realized that Nicks had collapsed onto the floor after falling off the sofa.

Released as a single in the United Kingdom on 28 November 1988, the song reached number 66 on the UK Singles Chart late in the year. In the United States, it reached number 40 on the Cashbox Top 100 and number 43 on the Billboard Hot 100 in early 1989. According to Radio & Records 68 percent of adult contemporary radio stations reporting to the publication had included "As Long As You Follow" on their playlists for the week of 25 November 1988. The song ultimately spent one week at number one on the Billboard adult contemporary chart in January 1989.

On its release, Cashbox said that the "western lilt to this easy-flowing tune sits well and should result in positive reaction on CHR, AC."

== B-sides ==
A live version of the band's 1969 song "Oh Well" served as a B-side for all release formats of "As Long As You Follow". The live version of "Oh Well" was recorded at a 1987 Fleetwood Mac concert at the Cow Palace in San Francisco, California (filmed as the Tango in the Night concert video), and features lead vocals by new band member Billy Burnette. The 12-inch and CD single formats further included the original 1977 studio version of the Stevie Nicks track "Gold Dust Woman", as featured on Fleetwood Mac's 1977 album, Rumours. The single's cover sleeve is identical to its parent album, Greatest Hits.

== Track listing ==
- 7-inch, cassette, and US mini-CD single
1. "As Long as You Follow"
2. "Oh Well" (live)
- 12-inch and UK mini-CD single
1. "As Long as You Follow"
2. "Oh Well" (live)
3. "Gold Dust Woman"

== Personnel ==
- Christine McVie – lead vocals, keyboards, synthesizers
- Rick Vito – lead guitar, backing vocals
- Billy Burnette – rhythm guitar, backing vocals
- John McVie – bass
- Mick Fleetwood – drums, percussion
- Stevie Nicks – backing vocals

== Charts ==
=== Weekly charts ===
Weekly chart performance for "As Long as You Follow"
Chart (1988–1989)	Peak position
Australia (ARIA)	35
Belgium (Ultratop 50 Flanders)	17
Canada Top Singles (RPM)	12
European Airplay (Music & Media)	41
Ireland (IRMA)	19
Netherlands (Dutch Top 40)	13
Netherlands (Single Top 100)	15
New Zealand (Recorded Music NZ)	35
UK Singles (Official Charts)	66
US Billboard Hot 100	43
US Adult Contemporary (Billboard)	1
US Mainstream Rock (Billboard)	15
US Cash Box Top 100	40
US Adult Contemporary (Gavin Report)	1
US Top 40 (Gavin Report)	30
US Adult Contemporary (Radio & Records)	1
US AOR Tracks (Radio & Records)	13

=== Year-end charts ===
Year-end chart performance for "As Long as You Follow"
Chart (1989)	Position
Canada Top Singles (RPM)	74
US Adult Contemporary (Gavin Report)	23
US Adult Contemporary (Radio & Records)	23

== Certifications ==
Region	Certification	Certified units/sales
New Zealand (RMNZ)	Gold	15,000^{‡}
^{‡} Sales+streaming figures based on certification alone.
