= Extended Play (Fleetwood Mac EP) =

EP by Fleetwood Mac
- Released: 30 April 2013
- Recorded: 2012–2013
- Genre: Rock, pop rock
- Length: 17:08
- Label: LMJS Productions
- Producer: Lindsey Buckingham and Mitchell Froom; Lindsey Buckingham and Stevie Nicks on "Without You"

Fleetwood Mac chronology
The Essential Fleetwood Mac (2007)	Extended Play (2013)	Fleetwood Mac: Opus Collection (2013)

Professional ratings
Review scores
Source	Rating
AllMusic	3.5/5 stars

Extended Play is an EP by British-American rock band Fleetwood Mac, released in 2013. Released as a digital download by the band themselves and without a record company, it was the band's first new music in ten years since their 2003 album Say You Will, the only studio work since their debut album to not involve Christine McVie in any capacity, and the last release of studio material to feature Lindsey Buckingham before his removal from the band in 2018. "Sad Angel" and "Without You" were also performed on the band's 2013 tour.

== Background ==
Around the time that Buckingham's Seeds We Sow solo album was released in 2011, Buckingham had expressed interest in working on a new Fleetwood Mac album. He approached Stevie Nicks about the matter, although she was unwilling to fully commit to the project. Buckingham then invited John McVie and Mick Fleetwood from Hawaii and recorded eight new songs with Mitchell Froom serving as producer. Buckingham commented that he selected songs with that he believed would be suitable for Nicks' vocal range. Nicks was in bereavement following the death of her mother and did not attend these sessions.

Later in 2012, Nicks spent four days in the studio to record vocals on two songs, one selected by Nicks and the other picked by Buckingham. Nicks also dusted off a demo from the Buckingham Nicks sessions. Buckingham commented that neither McVie nor Fleetwood worked on the new recording of "Without You". When Nicks presented "Without You" to Buckingham, the initial idea was to use the song for Fleetwood Mac, although by December 2012, Nicks was more interested in putting the track on a re-release of the Buckingham Nicks album.

In a 2012 interview with Rolling Stone, Nicks considered releasing one new song in January 2013 and another in February 2013, although Buckingham wanted the band to instead release their new material in the form of an EP. Buckingham originally hoped that his set of songs would encourage Nicks to contribute some material that would culminate into a full album, but Nicks lacked interest in pursuing this option, so the idea was instead pared down into an EP.

One song on the album, "It Takes Time", was recorded as piano ballad. Buckingham commented that the song was about reflecting on past decisions from a more objective perspective, which he related to his relationship with Nicks. He added that "there were times in the past when maybe I could have shown her a little more love or shown her a way to make her process a bit easier. From the first day of rehearsal, I had that in mind." Fleetwood wrote in his 2014 memoir Play On that the song was a "poignant" commentary on the relationship between Buckingham and Nicks, saying that it was "a homecoming to their story because it's entirely an apology to her, which is beautiful and heartbreaking."

Despite the EP being released only digitally, without any promotion or physical edition, Extended Play still reached No. 48 on the Billboard 200 albums chart and sold 9,000 copies in its first week. However, the next week, it left the chart entirely. It also charted at No. 14 on the Top Digital Albums chart, No. 9 on the Top Independent Albums chart, and No. 13 on the Top Rock Albums chart.

== Track listing ==
Extended Play track listing
No.	Title	Writer(s)	Length
1.	"Sad Angel"	Lindsey Buckingham	4:03
2.	"Without You"	Stevie Nicks	4:39
3.	"It Takes Time"	Buckingham	4:09
4.	"Miss Fantasy"	Buckingham	4:17
Total length:			17:08

== Personnel ==
- Lindsey Buckingham – guitars, keyboards, piano, bass guitar, programming, vocals
- Stevie Nicks – vocals
- John McVie – bass guitar
- Mick Fleetwood – drums, percussion
