= Farmer's Daughter (preserves) =

American preserves company

- Founder: April McGreger
- Headquarters: Hillsborough, North Carolina, United States
- Products: Preserves, pickles, chutney
- Website: www.farmersdaughterbrand.com

Farmer's Daughter is a small batch jam, jelly, preserve, pickle, and chutney business started by April McGreger in Hillsborough, North Carolina. She sources ingredients from local farmers and has her own garden. She uses foraged honeysuckle, Arkansas Black apples, peaches from Sandhills (Carolina), blueberries, strawberries, ginger, vanilla, and lemon verbena. Products include pepper jelly (apple jelly with serrano peppers). McGregor's family grows sweet potatoes in Mississippi. She worked in restaurants including Lantern in Chapel Hill, North Carolina. In 2005 she made blueberry jam as a party favor and by 2007 was jarring in earnest.

As of 2014, Farmer's Daughter products were sold at market booths in Carrboro, North Carolina and Durham, North Carolina, served at restaurants such as Crook's Corner in Chapel Hill (where the sweet potato habanero hot sauce is used in the cantaloupe soup) and at Panciuto in Hillsborough (where jams and preserves are part of the meat and cheese boards). The products were also sold mail-order via the Farmer's Daughter website.
