= Farmer's Daughter (The Beach Boys song) =

1963 song by the Beach Boys

Song by the Beach Boys

from the album Surfin' U.S.A.
- Released: March 25, 1963
- Recorded: January 5-31, February 11 1963
- Studio: Western, Hollywood
- Length: 1:49
- Label: Capitol
- Songwriters: Brian Wilson; Mike Love
- Producer: Nick Venet

"Farmer's Daughter" is a song by the American rock band the Beach Boys, appearing on their Surfin’ U.S.A. album in 1963. Although the song was originally solely credited to Brian Wilson, Mike Love was later awarded a writing credit. "Farmer's Daughter" was later covered by Fleetwood Mac on their 1980 Live album and released as a single in Austria, where it reached the top ten.

== Background ==
Initial tracking for "Farmer's Daughter" was completed around the same time as "Lana" and soon after the master tracks were completed for "Surfin' U.S.A." and "Shut Down". An acetate disc containing early mixes of "Lana" and "Farmer's Daughter" was made at Radio Recorders with the recording date being listed as January 16, 1963.

The song starts with a surf-guitar lick, which author Philip Lambert likened to "The Shift", a Wilson-Love composition from the Beach Boys' 1962 debut album, Surfin' Safari. Both songs adhere to an AABA form, with a similar chord progression in the B-section and an ascending melody that moves from the first tonal degree to the fifth degree before returning to the root note of the scale. Lambert also stated that the song draws further elements from "Number One (Visions)", a song penned by Wilson and Gary Usher in 1962, with the final phrases of both songs following a IV-V-I chord progression.

Guitarist David Marks believed that an encounter with a young fan after a Beach Boys performance in Northern California served as a partial inspiration for the song. Lyrically, the song pertains to the sexual fantasies of a teenage boy who offers to travel miles away to have a one-night stand with the farmer's daughter.

Donald A. Guarisco of AllMusic described "Farmer's Daughter" as one of the band's most appealing early tracks. He wrote that "the song's hypnotic quality is bolstered by the Beach Boys' effective recording, which downplays the instrumentation in favor of a sweet-sounding vocal arrangement that allows Brian Wilson's gorgeous falsetto lead to take flight over background vocals that repeat key words in a mesmerizing fashion. The end result is a beguiling tune that has endeared itself to the many students of Wilson's songcraft".

== Fleetwood Mac version ==
"The Farmer's Daughter"

Single by Fleetwood Mac

from the album Live
- Released: 30 January 1981
- Recorded: 1980
- Venue: Santa Monica Civic Auditorium
- Length: 2:12
- Label: Warner Bros.
- Songwriters: Brian Wilson; Mike Love
- Producers: Richard Dashut; Ken Caillat; Fleetwood Mac

Fleetwood Mac singles chronology
"Fireflies" (1981)	"The Farmer's Daughter" (1981)	"Hold Me" (1982)

Fleetwood Mac originally recorded a cover of "Farmer's Daughter" during the Tusk sessions in 1979. Guitarist Lindsey Buckingham played the song during breaks, with Stevie Nicks occasionally joining in on vocal harmonies. Brian Wilson was an influence on Buckingham since he was a teenager, and Brian's brother Dennis was dating Fleetwood Mac keyboardist Christine McVie at the time. In February 1979, Brian visited Studio D of The Village Recorder at the request of Buckingham, which further inspired him to record "Farmer's Daughter".

Buckingham played the riff on a Fender Bass VI, which was plugged directly into the mixing console. He recorded four different takes, each with slight variations in the muting and string bending. Producer Ken Caillat added a Neve preamp and equalizer to these tracks and applied a Universal 1176 compressor to provide the instrument with more character. Drummer Mick Fleetwood eschewed the surf-beat found on the original recording in favor of a basic groove on muffled tom-toms. For the vocals, Buckingham, Nicks, and McVie sang their first take in falsetto and did two additional vocal harmonies through three Neumann U49 microphones. Small auratone 5C monitor speakers were also placed in the room for sound reference. The band spent 24 hours in the studio working on the track and later presented the recording to Dennis Wilson, who broke down in tears upon hearing it. While the song was not included on the original release of Tusk, it did appear as a bonus track on the remastered edition of the album in 2004.

In 1980, a recording from the Santa Monica Civic Auditorium was used on the Live album. In an interview with BAM magazine, Buckingham explained that he had "always been a Brian Wilson fan, and so much of what he’s done has either gone over people’s heads or been ignored for one reason or another...'Farmer's Daughter' probably could've been a successful single for them if they'd released it." He further stated that the band selected the song for inclusion on Live due to its relative obscurity. Later that year, the song was released as a single in North America, Australia, and various countries in continental Europe. It only charted in Austria, where it debuted and peaked at number six.

Reviewing the single for Music Week, Tony Jasper questioned some of the song's production decisions, including the presence of uneven applause, "barely audible yelps", and the entrance of the drums. He believed that "The Farmer's Daughter" "ends too soon and does so with sloppy editing", and that the "song itself has hypnotic quality employing girls in subdued mood."

== Track listing ==
7-inch single (Europe)

1. "The Farmer's Daughter" – 2:12
2. "Dreams" (live) – 4:18

7-inch single (North America and Australia)

1. "The Farmer's Daughter" – 2:12
2. "Monday Morning" (live) – 4:01

== Weekly charts ==
Chart (1981)	Peak position
Austria (Ö3 Austria Top 40)	6
