= Hypnotized (Fleetwood Mac song) =

- Cover of the "For Your Love" single

Single by Fleetwood Mac

from the album Mystery to Me
- A-side: "For Your Love"
- Released: 15 October 1973
- Recorded: Mid-1973
- Studio: Rolling Stones Mobile Studio
- Genre: Soft rock; psychedelic rock
- Length: 4:48
- Label: Reprise
- Songwriter: Bob Welch
- Producers: Fleetwood Mac & Martin Birch

"Hypnotized" is a song by British-American rock band Fleetwood Mac, released in 1973 on the album Mystery to Me. Written and sung by guitarist Bob Welch, it was also released as the B-side of the single "For Your Love" and has been described as "gorgeous and lyrically strong", and referred to as the album's best track.

== Background and style ==
The song features triple time rhythm on the drums by Mick Fleetwood and combines with acoustic guitar and electric keyboards. Fleetwood played the drum track straight through without any overdubs. Welch draws upon the use of jazz fourth chords in the song, playing in a minor key, and also features a guitar solo by Bob Weston covering many octaves.

Hypnosis and dreaming are specifically referred to in the lyrics, and Welch also draws upon references to places such as Mexico and North Carolina. According to Welch, the atmosphere of the song was heavily influenced by his residence at the Benifold Mansion in Hampshire, England, a place he described as "rather spooky and strange even in summertime". Fleetwood said the group vocal harmonies found on "Hypnotized" would "later become their trademark".

== Reception ==
Donald Brackett, in his 2007 book Fleetwood Mac, 40 Years of Creative Chaos, discussed the album Mystery to Me and the song "Hypnotized", which he described as "a gentle yet compelling hit for Welch on this record". In discussing Fleetwood Mac's change in direction in 1972 and 1973, he describes their stylistic changes as being better received at concerts in the United States, as at the time Americans were more open to them than the British, who were still in heavy demand for blues-oriented rock. Hal Horowitz describes the song as "the highlight of the Mystery to Me album, and undoubtedly one of Bob Welch's most fully realised songs for the band". The Guardian praised the instrumentation as "musical gold" and posited that the song could have been commercially successful if it was released as an A-side. Rolling Stone ranked the song 20th on its list of the 50 greatest Fleetwood Mac songs and called it a "beguiling contribution from singer-guitarist Bob Welch" that served as a link between the band's blues origins to their pop rock output.

In 1999, Welch received an award from ASCAP recognising 25 consecutive years of airplay for "Hypnotized" and "Sentimental Lady".

== Personnel ==
- Bob Welch – lead vocals, guitar
- Bob Weston – guitar
- Christine McVie – keyboards, backing vocals
- John McVie – bass guitar
- Mick Fleetwood – drums
