= Fireflies (Fleetwood Mac song) =

Single by Fleetwood Mac

from the album Live
- B-side: "Over My Head" (Live)
- Released: January 1981
- Recorded: September 4, 1980
- Venue: Santa Monica Civic Auditorium, Santa Monica, CA
- Length: 4:44 (album version); 3:30 (single mix)
- Label: Warner Bros.
- Songwriter: Stevie Nicks
- Producers: Richard Dashut; Ken Caillat; Fleetwood Mac

Fleetwood Mac singles chronology
"Angel" (1980)	"Fireflies" (1981)	"The Farmer's Daughter" (1981)

"Fireflies" is a song by British-American rock band Fleetwood Mac, taken from their live album Live (1980). One of three new tracks featured on Live, "Fireflies" was written by Stevie Nicks and produced by the band, Richard Dashut, and Ken Caillat. It was released in January 1981, in a remixed form via Warner Bros., as the live album's lead single. The song became a minor hit, charting at No. 60 on the US Billboard Hot 100.

== Critical reception ==
Record World wrote positively of the track, saying that "Stevie Nicks' optimistic treatise on strained adult relationships strikes a balance between live immediacy and studio production. Moving drama for AOR and pop."

== Track listing ==
US 7-inch single

1. "Fireflies" (Remix) – 3:30
2. "Over My Head" (Live) – 3:40

== Personnel ==
Taken from the Live liner notes.

- Stevie Nicks – vocals
- Lindsey Buckingham – guitar, vocals
- Christine McVie – keyboards, vocals
- John McVie – bass
- Mick Fleetwood – drums

Recorded live at the Santa Monica Civic Auditorium for crew and friends.

== Charts ==
Chart (1981)	Peak position
US Billboard Hot 100	60
US Mainstream Rock (Billboard)	59
US Cash Box Top 100	68
US Record World Singles	71
