= Jeremy Spencer (album) =

Studio album by Jeremy Spencer
- Released: 23 January 1970
- Genre: Rock, rock and roll, blues
- Label: Reprise
- Producer: Jeremy Spencer

Jeremy Spencer chronology
Jeremy Spencer (1970)	Jeremy Spencer and the Children (1972)

Jeremy Spencer is an album by British blues rock musician Jeremy Spencer, who was a member of Fleetwood Mac from 1967–71. Released on 23 January 1970, this was his first solo album and the first solo album by a contemporaneous member of Fleetwood Mac.

The album consists of 1950s-style songs, many of them genre-parodies, such as surf pop on "Surfin' Girl". Accompanying Spencer on the album were the other members of Fleetwood Mac, although Peter Green only played on one track, contributing banjo to "String-a-long". The album came immediately after the Fleetwood Mac album Then Play On, which did not feature Spencer.

On 17 October 1970, "Linda" was released as a single, with the non-album "Teenage Darling" on the B-side, composed by Spencer. During 1970 Fleetwood Mac concerts, Jeremy appeared on stage dressed as Elvis Presley, performing "Teenage Darling", with Peter Green on lead guitar.

In 2015, the album was released on CD, with "Teenage Darling" as a bonus track.

== Track listing ==
All songs written by Jeremy Spencer, except where noted.

1. "Linda" – 2:19
2. "The Shape I'm In" (Lee Cathy, Otis Blackwell) – 2:00
3. "Mean Blues" – 4:10
4. "String-a-long" (Jimmy Duncan, Robert Doyle) – 2:20
5. "Here Comes Charlie (With His Dancing Shoes On)" – 2:46
6. "Teenage Love Affair" – 2:58
7. "Jenny Lee" – 2:00
8. "Don't Go Please Stay" – 2:38
9. "You Made a Hit" (Walt Maynard) – 2:10
10. "Take a Look Around Mrs Brown" – 4:30
11. "Surfin' Girl" – 2:03
12. "If I Could Swim the Mountain" – 3:29

== Personnel ==
- Jeremy Spencer – vocals, electric guitar, slide guitar, piano
- Mick Fleetwood – drums, congas, percussion
- John McVie – bass guitar
- Danny Kirwan – guitar, backing vocals
- Peter Green – banjo on "String-a-Long"
- Steve Gregory – saxophone

Technical

- Terence Ibbott – photography

== Production ==
- Produced by Jeremy Spencer
