= Station Man =

Song by Fleetwood Mac

from the album Kiln House
- A-side: "Jewel Eyed Judy"
- Released: 18 September 1970
- Recorded: 1970
- Studio: De Lane Lea, London
- Length: 5:52
- Label: Reprise
- Songwriters: Danny Kirwan; Jeremy Spencer; John McVie
- Producer: Fleetwood Mac

"Station Man" is a song by British rock group Fleetwood Mac, which was released as the second track from their 1970 Kiln House album. The song is credited to Danny Kirwan, Jeremy Spencer, and John McVie, although Spencer said in a 2010 interview that Christine McVie was more responsible for the song than John McVie. Kirwan, Christine McVie, and Spencer wrote the song's lyrics at the band's communal house in the English countryside, where Kirwan also developed the song's arrangement.

"Station Man" was sung as a duet between Kirwan and Christine McVie, who at the time of the recording had yet to officially join Fleetwood Mac due to contractual reasons. The song features an extended fade-in, slide guitar playing by Spencer, and conga overdubs from Mick Fleetwood. In 1971, it was issued as the B-side to "Jewel Eyed Judy, another song from the Kiln House album. "Station Man" was included in the band's setlist until 1977, several years after the departure of Kirwan and Spencer. Footage from a rehearsal was included in the Black, White and Blues documentary released in 1971 and directed by Revel Guest.

== Live performances ==
"Station Man" was also performed live by the Kiln House lineup of Fleetwood Mac, with a few recordings from 1970 and 1971 appearing on the Madison Blues album. In 1971, The Spectrum student newspaper identified "Station Man" as one of the songs in the band's setlist when Peter Green performed a few shows with Fleetwood Mac after Spencer left a few weeks into the accompanying Kiln House tour to join a religious sect.

According to Fleetwood in his 2014 memoir Play On, "Station Man" was the first song that Fleetwood Mac performed live with Lindsey Buckingham and Stevie Nicks, when the lineup made their live debut in El Paso, Texas on 15 May 1975. At the time, Buckingham and Nicks only had material from their 1973 Buckingham Nicks album and 1975 Fleetwood Mac album to pull from, which required them to cull earlier songs from the band's discography for live performances. The song was also retained for the first leg of the band's 1977 Rumours Tour, but it was later dropped from the setlist by the end of March.

== Critical reception and influence ==
In his review for NME, Nick Logan said that "Station Man" was "possibly the album's premiere track and the one Reprise are trying to persuade the group to release as a single." He further commended the song's instrumentation, including Fleetwood's percussion and Kirwan's "tasteful guitar", and called it "one of the group's foremost achievements to date." In their book, Fleetwood Mac: Rumours n' Fax, Roy Carr and Steve Clarke labeled "Station Man" as "the premiere cut" on Kiln House with a melody "neatly slung over the kind of dense broken riffing which has become a trademark with numerous mid-70s American West Coast band like Little Feat." Beat Instrumental cited "Station Man" as a successful demonstration of the band's "multi-guitar work". Alexis Petridis of The Guardian identified "Station Man" as a highlight on Kiln House and described it as a "hard rocking" song.

Phil Lesh said in an interview that he borrowed aspects of "Station Man" for the song "Passenger" on Grateful Dead's 1977 Terrapin Station album. "What's weird about that song is I sort of did it as a joke. It's a take on a Fleetwood Mac tune called "Station Man". I just sort of sped it up and put some different chord changes in there." Pete Townshend also borrowed the guitar riff from "Station Man" for his song "Won't Get Fooled Again", which was recorded by The Who. During a 2020 Peter Green tribute concert organised by Fleetwood, Townshend prefaced his performance of "Station Man" by noting similarities between the two song's chord progressions. This performance, recorded at the London Palladium, was later included on the album Celebrate the Music of Peter Green and the Early Years of Fleetwood Mac in 2021.

== Personnel ==
- Mick Fleetwood – drums, congas
- John McVie – bass guitar
- Jeremy Spencer – slide guitar, vocals
- Danny Kirwan – guitar, vocals
- Christine McVie – keyboards, vocals
