= Kiln House =

Studio album by Fleetwood Mac
- Released: 18 September 1970
- Recorded: June–July 1970
- Studios: De Lane Lea, London
- Genres: Blues rock; rock and roll; folk rock; soft rock
- Length: 33:54
- Label: Reprise
- Producer: Fleetwood Mac

Fleetwood Mac chronology
Fleetwood Mac in Chicago (1969)	Kiln House (1970)	The Original Fleetwood Mac (1971)

Kiln House is the fourth studio album by British blues rock band Fleetwood Mac, released on 18 September 1970 by Reprise Records. This is the first album after the departure of founder Peter Green, and their last album to feature guitarist Jeremy Spencer. Christine McVie was present at the recording sessions and contributed backing vocals, keyboards and cover art, although she was not a full member of the band until shortly after the album's completion, when she was to join the band for the album's accompanying tour.

The album peaked number 39 in the UK, becoming their last album to reach the top 40 in that country until their 1975 self-titled album. It also reached number 67 and number 69 in Canada and the United States, which up to that point was band's highest charting album in those respective countries.

== Background ==
Kiln House was recorded after the departure of Peter Green, a founding member of Fleetwood Mac. Around the time of Green's final performance with the band on 28 May 1970, the remaining members regrouped by moving to the English countryside with their wives, children, and road managers. John McVie commented that "The legs went out from under us, and we were faced with a future without Peter."

The album title is taken from the name of two converted oast houses, known as Kiln House, in Truncheaunts Lane in East Worldham, near Alton, Hampshire. The oast houses had previously been used for drying hops for beer brewing and were later combined into one building. In 1977, the property became a listed building.

The band leased Kiln House and lived there communally with their families for a six-month period in 1970. Mick Fleetwood married Jenny Boyd at the house on 20 June 1970. McVie recalled that they spent some of their time smoking hashish and making tie-dye shirts at the property. The band converted one of the spaces within the facility into a music room. Boyd described the space as a converted barn and said that the band used the room to rehearse material. She recalled occasionally overhearing Kirwan singing wordless vocals over the music as they practiced. Spencer later recounted his memories recording the album in a Q&A.

I remember sitting with Mick, Danny and Christine in a small side room off the practice studio that occupied what decades ago used to be the oast-drying place for the making of beer and mulling over our future. All we knew, Danny and I, was that we had some material to record.

— Jeremy Spencer

== Recording ==
The band spent two weeks recording Kiln House at De Lane Lea Studios. Christine McVie, who at the time was still known as Christine Perfect, lived in Kiln House with the band and participated in the album's recording sessions. She was signed to Blue Horizon as a solo artist and could not be credited as a musician in the liner notes of Kiln House due to contractual reasons. Clifford Davis, the band's manager, provided McVie with session money for her contributions.

Spencer, who played on one track during the recording of the previous album, Then Play On, played a much more active role during the Kiln House sessions. His retro 1950s homages and parodies dominate the album and Danny Kirwan's songs are almost equally prominent. Spencer was particularly influenced by rockabilly and music from the Sun Records record label. He recorded several of his demos on Revox machines and overdubbed multi-track vocal harmonies onto the demos. The band would later incorporate some vocal harmonies onto final versions that appeared on Kiln House. During the recording process, microphones were positioned close to the drums to achieve a sound that Fleetwood described as "very closed down" and "tight". Fleetwood also placed towels on his drums to create a muted tone.

"Buddy's Song" is derivative of "Peggy Sue Got Married" with new lyrics listing a number of Buddy Holly song titles with a writing credit given to Buddy's mother. Fleetwood Mac's cover of "Hi Ho Silver" was based on a recording titled "Honey Hush" from Johnny Burnette's Rock and Roll Trio. Johnny Burnette's nephew, Billy Burnette, later joined Fleetwood Mac in 1987. Fleetwood Mac performed "Buddy's Song" and "Honey Hush" on BBC Radio 1 for a broadcast on Top Gear; these recordings later appeared on Live at the BBC in 1995.

"Jewel Eyed Judy" was written about the band's secretary Judy Wong. McVie wrote the lyrics with Boyd, who at the time was four months pregnant with her first child. The song was also released as a single in certain markets, including the United States and the Netherlands. Spencer's "Blood on the Floor" was a style parody of country and western dirges. An early version of Kirwan's instrumental "Earl Gray", entitled "Farewell", was later released on the compilation The Vaudeville Years. Demos of the song were recorded in the middle of April 1970 at De Lane Lea Studio when Green was still a member of the band. Spencer originally wanted to drop "One Together" from the album, but the band convinced him otherwise. "Tell Me All the Things You Do" was included in Fleetwood Mac's live setlists through 1977 and again in 2018–2019 during the band's An Evening with Fleetwood Mac Tour. "Mission Bell" was a cover of a 1960s ballad originally performed by Donnie Brooks. In a Q&A, Spencer said that their cover of "Mission Bell" was not universally accepted by the public; he recalled hearing people express their displeasure with the rendition included on Kiln House.

== Touring and release ==
Five days before they were set to depart for their American tour, the band asked Christine Perfect to join Fleetwood Mac. Following five days of rehearsals, the band left for America on 26 July 1970. The band's first performance was in New Orleans on the first of August. One week after her first performance with the band, the British press announced that she had joined the group and would be known as Christine McVie from then on.

McVie said that the band was met with apprehension for some of their performances, particularly amongst those who missed Peter Green. "I think the audience are wondering what we are going to be like. Before Peter ran the band. Now there is no leader, we just take turns. Obviously, some of the people miss Peter's guitar playing. But then, the sound is different now and other people have said that they don't even notice he's missing." McVie said that she was a "nervous wreck" during the tour and remembered that the shows incorporated some improvisation with extensive soloing. She credited this tour as being "a time of learning" for improving her keyboard playing. "Let's Dance" by Chris Montez and "Mission Bell" were among the songs included in the band's setlist. Spencer did not participate during certain portions of the set and would join the band later on to perform covers, particularly tracks from Elmore James.

Spencer recalled that the album and ensuing tour were met with hostility in the UK. However, Kiln House was received much more favorably in North America, where it peaked at No. 69 on the Billboard 200 album chart on 7 November 1970 and No. 67 in Canada's RPM Magazine, 19 December 1970. At the time, Kiln House was Fleetwood Mac's best-selling album in the US.

In 1971, the band travelled to Los Angeles for their next performance, where they were slated to play at the Whisky a Go Go. After they arrived at the hotel, Spencer informed Fleetwood that he was going out to visit a bookstore. The performance was cancelled when Spencer did not return; Davis contacted the local police and a local radio station to determine Spencer's whereabouts. Davis was later informed that Spencer had joined The Children of God, a religious cult, and travelled to their headquarters to meet with Spencer. During their discussion, Spencer maintained his preference to remain with The Children of God and confirmed that he would not be returning to Fleetwood Mac. Rather than cancel the tour, the band asked Green to fulfill the remaining dates.

== Critical reception ==
Professional ratings
Review scores
Source	Rating
AllMusic	3.5/5 stars
Christgau's Record Guide	A−

In his review of Kiln House, J.R. Young wrote in Rolling Stone that the album was "carefully conceived and prepared" and marked a shift from the Fleetwood Mac's earlier work with Green, saying that "Danny Kirwan and Jeremy Spencer took up the slack and built a new engine" for the band. He felt that Kirwan was successful in reining in Spencer's retro-pastiches such as "Blood on the Floor" and also found Spencer's material on Kiln House to be more tasteful than the songs found on his self-titled album released earlier in 1970.

Billboard characterised the album as a foray into "the roots of contemporary rock." Record World noted the band's pivot away from blues music in favor of "straightaway rock entertainment" and believed that fans of the band would find the material pleasing. Cashbox thought that Kiln House demonstrated the band's ability to create "new and exciting material".

Robert Christgau rated the album higher than Then Play On even with the absence of the "miraculously fluent [Peter] Green." Regarding one aspect of the band’s then bifurcated style, he claimed "the mansions in their jazzy blues/rock and roll guitar heaven are spacier than ever." In reference to the album’s rockabilly parodies, he admitted that Spencer's "Blood on the Floor” was "less charitable than one would hope", but was more complimentary toward "This is the Rock". Beat Instrumental described the band as a "mighty fine unit" without Green and highlighted the "nostalgia for the fading 'fifties" that permeated through Spencer's compositions. They also thought that "Station Man" and "Tell Me All the Things You Do" exemplified the band's "multi-guitar work". In a retrospective review, Bruce Eder of AllMusic wrote that the album lacked the intensity found on some of their previous work with Green, but said that the album instead "broaden[ed] the band's use of blues into other contexts, and add[ed] new influences in the absence of Green's laser-like focus."

== Track listing ==
Side one
No.	Title	Writer(s)	Lead vocals	Length
1.	"This Is the Rock"	Jeremy Spencer	Spencer	2:45
2.	"Station Man"	Danny Kirwan; Spencer; John McVie	Kirwan	5:49
3.	"Blood on the Floor"	Spencer	Spencer	2:44
4.	"Hi Ho Silver"	Big Joe Turner	Spencer	3:05
5.	"Jewel Eyed Judy"	Kirwan; Mick Fleetwood; J. McVie	Kirwan	3:17

Side two
No.	Title	Writer(s)	Lead vocals	Length
6.	"Buddy's Song"	Ella Holley	Spencer	2:08
7.	"Earl Gray"	Kirwan	instrumental	4:01
8.	"One Together"	Spencer	Spencer	3:23
9.	"Tell Me All the Things You Do"	Kirwan	Kirwan	4:10
10.	"Mission Bell"	Jesse D. Hodges; William Michael	Spencer	2:32

2020 Remastered bonus tracks
No.	Title	Writer(s)	Lead vocals	Length
11.	"Dragonfly"	Kirwan; W. H. Davies	Kirwan	2:49
12.	"Purple Dancer"	Kirwan; J. McVie; Fleetwood	Kirwan; Spencer	5:42
13.	"Jewel Eyed Judy" (Single Version)	Kirwan; Fleetwood; J. McVie	Kirwan	3:21
14.	"Station Man" (Single Version)	Kirwan; Spencer; J. McVie	Kirwan	5:10

- "Hi Ho Silver" (a.k.a. "Honey Hush") is incorrectly credited to Fats Waller and Ed Kirkeby, in confusion with another song (Waller died ten years before this song was written).
- "Purple Dancer" is referred to as such only on the 2020 remastered album; on all prior releases it is titled "The Purple Dancer".

== Personnel ==
Fleetwood Mac

- Danny Kirwan – guitar, vocals
- Jeremy Spencer – guitar, slide guitar, vocals, piano
- John McVie – bass guitar
- Mick Fleetwood – drums, percussion

Additional personnel

- Christine McVie – Wurlitzer 200A, piano, backing vocals (uncredited)

Production

- Producer – Fleetwood Mac
- Engineer – Martin Birch
- Cover drawing – Christine McVie

== Charts ==
Chart (1970)	Peak position
Australian Albums (Kent Music Report)	26
Canada Top Albums/CDs (RPM)	67
UK Albums (Official Charts)	39
US Billboard 200	69
