= Jeremy Spencer =

British musician (born 1948)

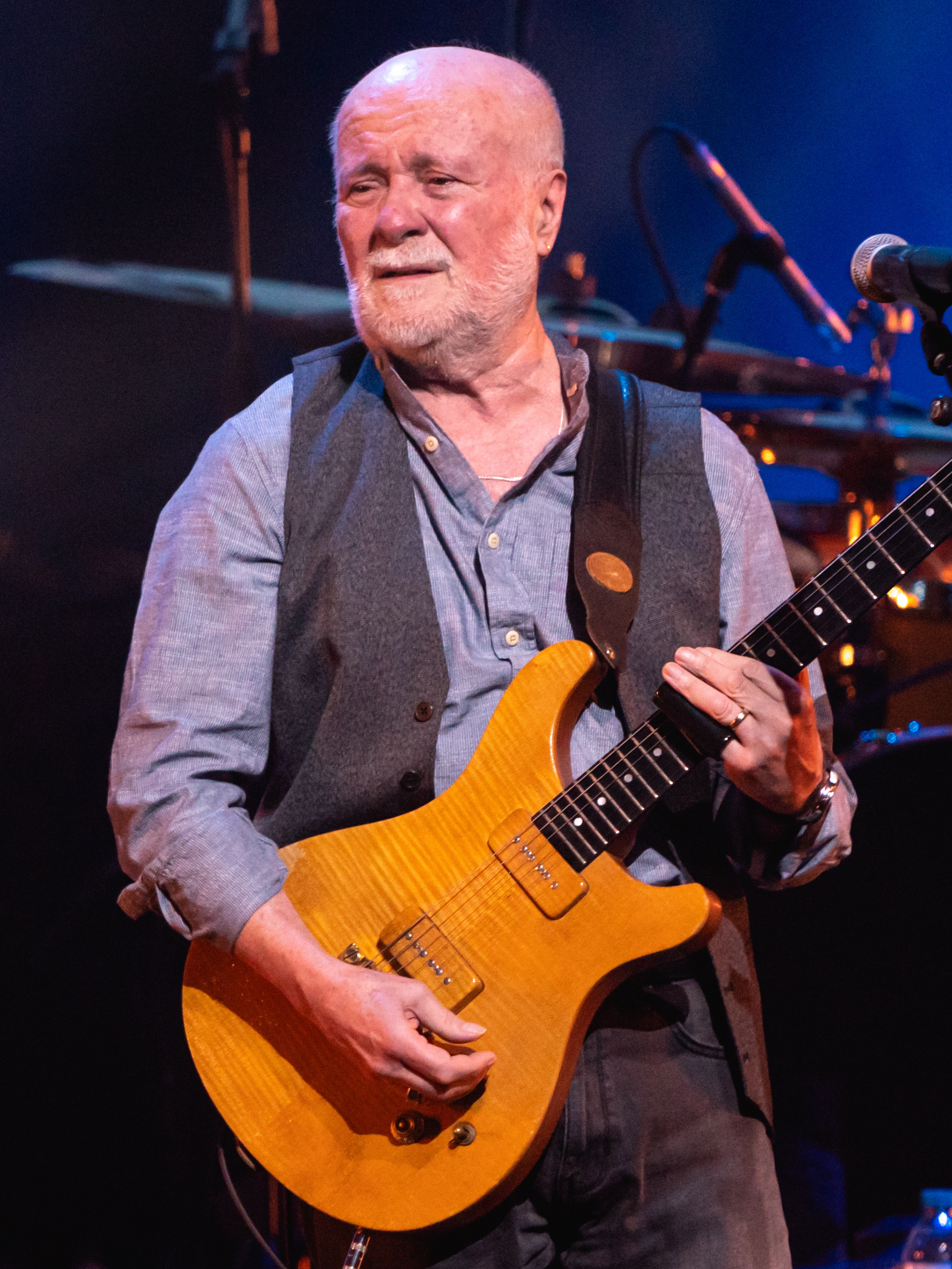
- Spencer performing in 2020

Background information
- Born: Jeremy Cedric Spencer; 4 July 1948 (age 78); Hartlepool, County Durham, England
- Genres: Blues; rock and roll
- Occupations: Musician; songwriter
- Instruments: Vocals; guitar; piano
- Years active: 1967–present
- Formerly of: Fleetwood Mac; Steetley
- Website: jeremyspencer.com

Jeremy Cedric Spencer (born 4 July 1948) is a British musician, best known for playing slide guitar and piano in the original line-up of the rock band Fleetwood Mac. A member since Fleetwood Mac's inception in July 1967, he remained with the band until his abrupt departure in February 1971, when he joined the Children of God, a religious organisation now known as The Family International, with which he is still affiliated. After a pair of solo albums in the 1970s, he continued to tour as a musician, but did not release another album until 2006. He released further solo albums from 2012 onwards and has also recorded as part of the folk trio Steetley. As a member of Fleetwood Mac, he was inducted into the Rock and Roll Hall of Fame in 1998.

== Early life ==
Spencer was born in Hartlepool, County Durham, and began taking piano lessons at the age of nine. Switching to guitar in his teens, his speciality became the slide guitar, and he was influenced by the American blues musician Elmore James.

== Fleetwood Mac ==
In the summer of 1967, Spencer came to the attention of ex-Bluesbreakers guitarist Peter Green, who was looking for another musician to join him in his new Fleetwood Mac project. Green had recruited drummer Mick Fleetwood and temporary bassist Bob Brunning, and wanted a second guitar player to fill out the sound onstage. Spencer was then playing with blues trio the Levi Set, and was already an accomplished slide guitarist and pianist. He fitted in well, and soon after his arrival, the band's intended bassist John McVie joined.

This line-up of Fleetwood Mac recorded two albums of traditional blues songs, with Spencer contributing many variations on the Elmore James theme, particularly centred around James' version of "Dust My Broom", plus a few songs of his own. Green became frustrated because Spencer did not seem willing to contribute to Green's songs, whereas Green always played on Spencer's recordings where necessary. On Fleetwood Mac, the 1968 debut album, Spencer gives a solo performance on vocal and piano of Robert Johnson's "Hellhound on My Trail".

Since Spencer's musical contributions to the band were too narrowly focused, Green and Fleetwood brought in a third guitarist, 18-year-old Danny Kirwan, after 1968's Mr. Wonderful. This album featured several of Spencer's Elmore James tunes.

Green and Kirwan found that they worked well together musically, quickly developing the style that provided hits such as "Albatross", "Man of the World" and "Oh Well", none of which featured Spencer. Spencer found himself slightly isolated within the band, and chose to contribute very little to the band's third album Then Play On. It was intended to complement this album with a separate EP of Spencer's work, but this never materialised. In the end, his input amounted to some piano on Green's neo-classical epic "Oh Well Pt. 2".

On stage however, Spencer was an integral part of the band, with a raucous routine of old blues songs which were extremely popular with audiences. Spencer was a gifted mimic, providing excellent impersonations of Elvis Presley, Buddy Holly, Elmore James, John Mayall and whoever else he felt like sending up at the time. He was also often given to occasional suggestive behaviour onstage, particularly at early concerts, which sometimes landed the band in trouble with promoters and venue owners, and got them banned from London's Marquee Club. This wild onstage atmosphere was caught in Spencer's recording "Somebody's Gonna Get Their Head Kicked In Tonite", which was chosen as the B-side to the gentle "Man of the World" single in 1969.

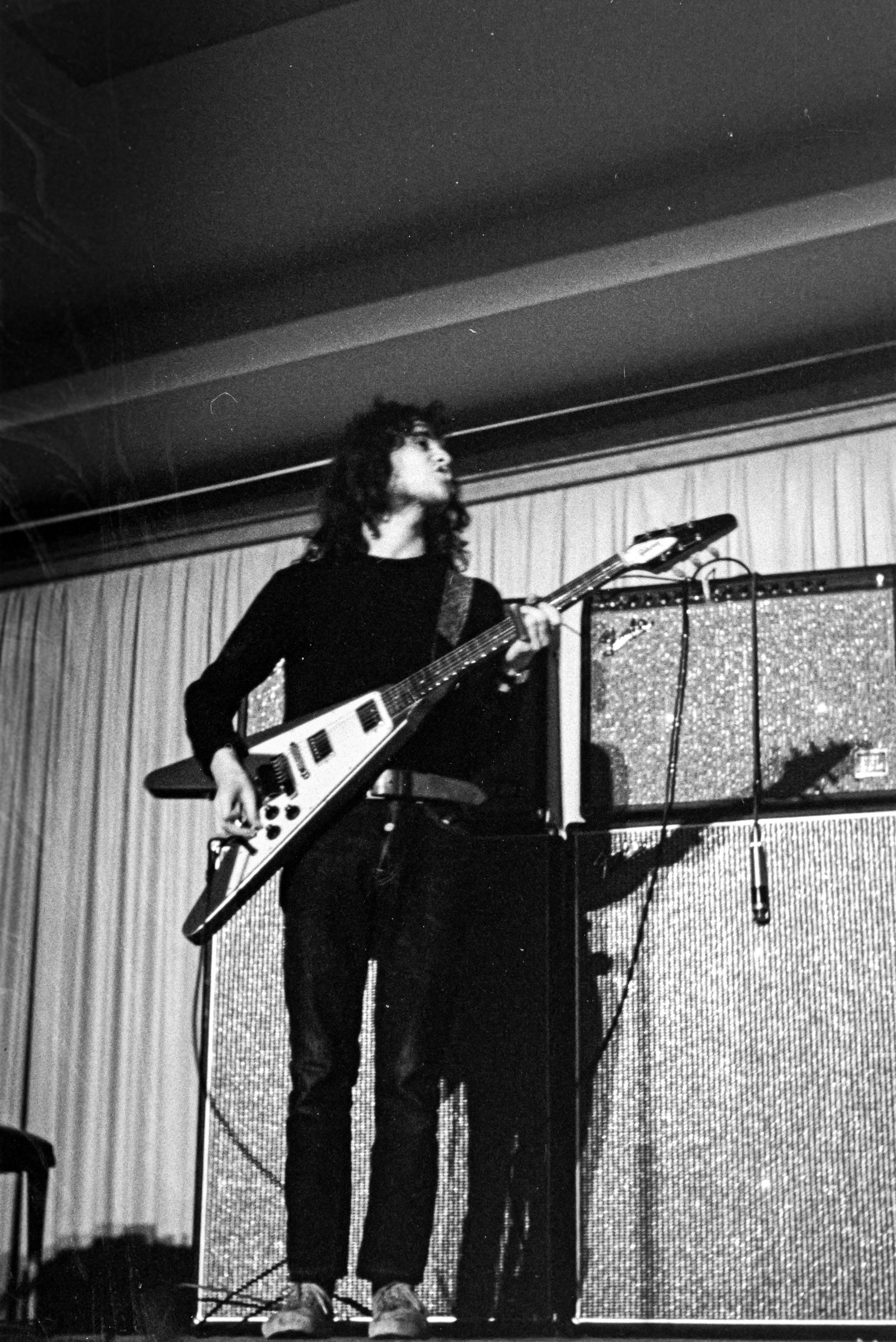
Jeremy Spencer, 18 March 1970

Away from the stage, Spencer was often quiet and withdrawn, and other band members recall him often reading the Bible in his hotel room, strongly at odds with his on-stage persona.

Spencer became the first member of Fleetwood Mac to release a solo album, simply titled Jeremy Spencer, in 1970. This album featured many 1950s parodies and amusing songs but was not a success. In December 2015, the album was released on CD.

When Green left Fleetwood Mac in mid-1970, the band were in a state of flux and there was a possibility of not continuing. However, the band held together, and both Spencer and Kirwan worked on new songs, which appeared on the Kiln House album released in the late summer of 1970. For the first time, the defining Elmore James songs were absent on Kiln House; instead, this album featured more of Spencer's 1950s parodies, including the Buddy Holly tribute "Buddy's Song". Spencer also co-wrote "Station Man" with Kirwan and John McVie. Another song, "One Together", touched on the many different personas that Spencer used onstage.

During a tour of the United States in February 1971 with new keyboardist Christine McVie now having joined the band, Spencer grew disillusioned with his life in Fleetwood Mac, and has mentioned in several interviews an incident when the band were listening to a recording of an old concert. When he heard himself singing, he said, "That sounds horrible. It sounds like shit." According to one account by Mick Fleetwood, Spencer apparently had difficulty recovering from a mescaline trip he had experienced very early on the US tour. Shortly before a journey of the band from San Francisco to Los Angeles, LA experienced a major earthquake. Being in a fragile mental state and filled with strong negative premonitions, Spencer was very apprehensive about having to travel to LA. He unsuccessfully pleaded with Fleetwood to cancel this leg of the tour. Shortly after arriving in LA on 15 February 1971, the day of a gig the group was scheduled to perform at the Whisky a Go Go, Spencer left the hotel room he shared with Fleetwood to visit a bookshop on Hollywood Boulevard. He did not return, forcing the cancellation of that evening's concert while the band and members of their entourage went searching for him. Five days later, he was found to have joined the Children of God, with his head shaven and having adopted the biblical name "Jonathan", and he declared that he no longer wanted to be involved with Fleetwood Mac. Despite appeals from the band's manager, Clifford Davis, to fulfil his obligations to Fleetwood Mac, Spencer could not be persuaded to rejoin the band and they had to struggle on without him, first recalling Peter Green out of retirement as an emergency measure, and later recruiting new guitarist Bob Welch.

Despite many rumours of brainwashing and forced induction into the organisation, Spencer has always maintained that he joined the organisation of his own free will. He had been approached by a young man named Apollos, who engaged Spencer in conversation about God, and invited him to a nearby mission where other members were staying. During the evening, Spencer became convinced that this change of direction was the best course for him to take, and by the time Fleetwood Mac found him, his mind was made up. Despite his continued confidence that he made the right choice, he has said that the manner of his departure from the band was regrettable: "The way I left was wrong and a mistake. I should've told them right away but I was desperate."

== After Fleetwood Mac ==
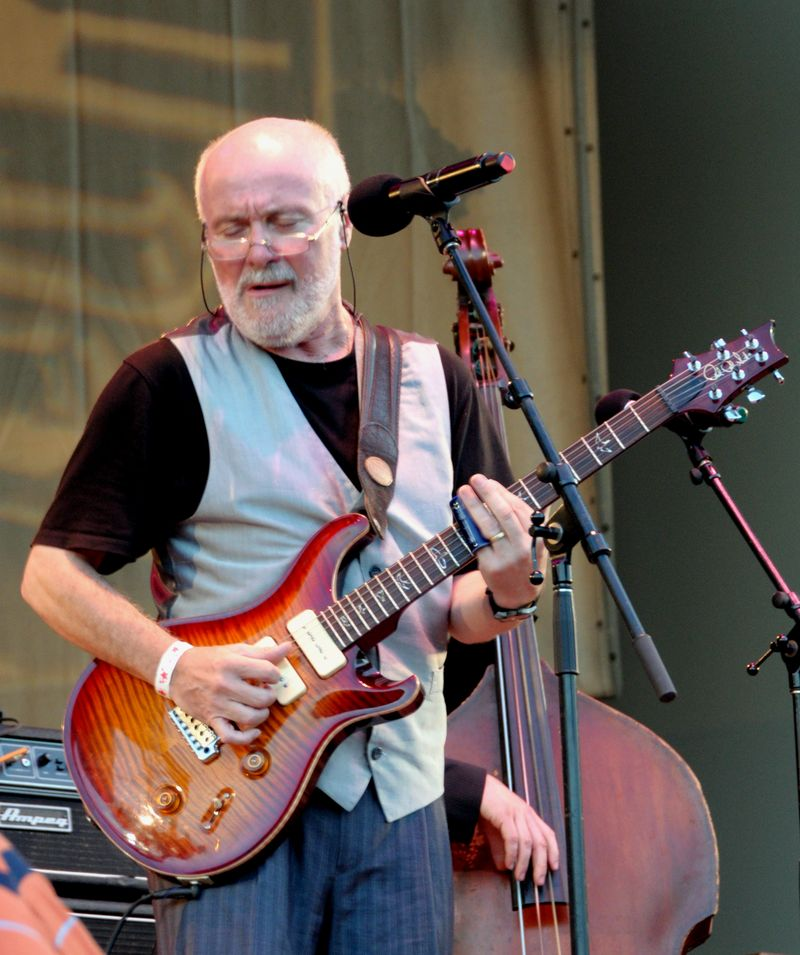
Spencer in 2009

Spencer and his then-wife Fiona moved to the US to settle with the Children of God. He soon formed a new band within the organisation and played free concerts around the country. An album was recorded, Jeremy Spencer and the Children, although without commercial success. In contrast to his commercially successful period, relatively little is known about this period of his life, but he travelled the world recording a considerable amount of music for the purposes of the organization. He moved to Brazil in 1975 and then to Italy in 1977.

In 1978 a member of the Children of God hired Martin and Steven Machat to represent Spencer and his new band. The Machats then secured them a major record deal with Atlantic Records in New York. In 1978–79 the newly formed Jeremy Spencer Band recorded the album Flee, which had a little commercial success. During the 1980s Spencer lived in the Philippines before working in India in the 1990s, holding charity concerts. In the second half of the 80s into the early 90s, a large number of albums from the Children of God band (renamed The Family in the 1980s) featuring Spencer were released during this time. These recordings were released under the names "The Family" and "Family of Love" and are often retrospectively credited to "Heaven's Magic" and "Family International".

He later lived in Ireland and then Germany and still works for the Children of God (now called the Family International), mainly as a book illustrator and story writer. He has continued to play music, often for his own amusement or in small settings, but also has appeared more often at various blues and gospel conventions. In 2006 he released the album Precious Little, recorded in Norway. The album showed a return to the blues and the slide guitar style that he became famous for while he was with Fleetwood Mac.

Spencer was inducted into the Rock and Roll Hall of Fame in 1998 for his past work as a member of Fleetwood Mac.

During the 2000s there were rumours of a reunion of the early line-up of Fleetwood Mac involving Peter Green and Jeremy Spencer. Whilst these two guitarists and vocalists apparently remained unconvinced of the merits of such a project, Danny Kirwan, who joined the band in 1968 as a third guitarist and vocalist and was fired in 1972, remained silent on the subject. In April 2006, during a question-and-answer session on the Penguin Fleetwood Mac fan website, bassist John McVie said of the reunion idea: "If we could get Peter and Jeremy to do it, I'd probably, maybe, do it. I know Mick would do it in a flash. Unfortunately, I don't think there's much chance of Danny doing it. Bless his heart." Kirwan died in 2018, and Green in 2020.

In 2007 Spencer was in contact with his former Fleetwood Mac bandmates Mick Fleetwood and John McVie, and according to McVie, the three had informal jam sessions with Rick Vito at Fleetwood's home. Spencer also took part in the TV documentary Peter Green: Man of the World, in which he was interviewed together with John McVie and Mick Fleetwood.

In 2012 Spencer released a new album, Bend in the Road, which was recorded at Tempermill Studios in Ferndale, Michigan, US. The vinyl, CD and download featured different track listings. This was followed in 2014 by Coventry Blue.

In 2014 Spencer abruptly cancelled a planned U.S. tour that had been partially financed through donations on Kickstarter, citing health reasons and threats. The tour had been opposed by the Safe Passage Foundation, a non-profit organisation that advocates for children raised in cults; Safe Passage Foundation credited its Change.org petition, which had received over 300 signatures, for the tour's cancellation.

Since then Spencer has concentrated on instrumental work. Homebrewed Blues (2016) showcased his slide guitar playing, whereas Treading Softly (2018) and Latina Nights (2019) focused on music inspired by Ireland and Latin America respectively.

Several of Spencer's children formed a band called JYNXT.

=== Steetley ===
During 2012–13, Spencer became involved with Hartlepool-based singer-songwriter Andy Oliver, and they eventually decided to record songs together. They formed a trio named Steetley, along with the Northern Irish musician and actress Janet Bamford, and in December 2013, released their debut album, The Moment She Fell.

On 26 February 2020, he made an appearance at the Peter Green tribute concert, making his first stage appearance with Mick Fleetwood in 49 years.

== Discography ==
=== Albums ===
- Jeremy Spencer (Reprise, 1970)
- Jeremy Spencer and the Children (CBS, 1972)
- Flee (Atlantic, 1979)
- In Session (2005)
- Precious Little (Bluestown, 2006)
- Bend in the Road (Propelz, 2012)
- Coventry Blue (Propelz, 2014)
- Homebrewed Blues (Sibylline Media, 2016)
- Treading Softly (Sibylline Media, 2018)
- Latina Nights (2019)
- Yearning Winds (2019)
- A Time for Angels (2019)
- Mona (2020)
- Before the Storm (2020)
- Waiting on Shore (2020)
- Melancholy Moon (2021)
- Boundless (2021)

Live album

- In Concert – India 1998 (PolyGram India, 1999)

=== Singles ===
- "Linda" / "Teenage Darling" (1969)
- "Can You Hear the Song" / "The World in Her Heart" (1971)
- "Cool Breeze" / "You've Got the Right" (1979)
- "Travellin'" / "Cool Breeze" (1979) (the B-side in the US was "Sunshine")
- "Natalis" (2020)
- "Steady On" (2021)
- "The Maid of Donadee" (2021)
- "Tears in the Glen" (2021)
- "Pavlova's Dream" (2021)
- "Second-hand Bookstore Man" (2021)
- "Long Home" (2021)
- "Terrapin" (2022)
- "Who Are the Rebels" (2022)
- "All Night Long" (2022)
- "Angoisse" (2022)
- "Red Sky Blues" (2022)
- "See How She Waits on Shore" (2022)
- "Dark Clouds Rolling" (2023)
- "American Lingo" (2023)
- "Goodbye Altea" (2023)
- "Lighthouse" (2023)
- "Tears for the King" (2023)
- "You Gotta Role" (2023)
- "Silver Linin'" (2023)
- "My End Is My Beginning" (2023)
- "First Bass" (2023)
- "Pilgrim Mother" (2023)
- "Where Is Our Home" (2024)
- "What Will They Be Telling Us Next?" (2024)
- "Chorus of the Morning" (2024)
- "Heaven Is Full of Sinners" (2024)
- "A Call to Love" (2024)
- "It's Not for Me to Say" (2024)

=== With Fleetwood Mac ===
- Fleetwood Mac (Blue Horizon 1968)
- Mr. Wonderful (Blue Horizon 1968)
- Then Play On (Reprise 1969)
- Fleetwood Mac In Chicago/Blues Jam In Chicago Vols 1 & 2 (Blue Horizon 1969)
- Kiln House (Reprise 1970)

=== With Steetley ===
- The Moment She Fell (2013)

=== With Mick Fleetwood ===
- Something Big (2004)

=== With Mick Fleetwood & Friends ===
- Celebrate the Music of Peter Green and the Early Years of Fleetwood Mac (2021)
