= Mirage Tour '82 =

Live album by Fleetwood Mac
- Released: 20 September 2024
- Recorded: 21 and 22 October 1982
- Venues: The Forum, Inglewood, California
- Genre: Rock
- Length: 114:42
- Label: Rhino Entertainment
- Producer: Ken Caillat

Fleetwood Mac chronology
Rumours Live (2023)	Mirage Tour '82 (2024)

Singles from Mirage Tour '82
- 1. "Don't Stop (Live at the Forum)" Released: 30 July 2024; 2. "Never Going Back Again (Live at the Forum)" Released: 21 August 2024; 3. "Oh Well (Live at the Forum)" Released: 18 September 2024

Mirage Tour '82 is a live album by English-American rock band Fleetwood Mac, released on 20 September 2024 by Rhino Entertainment.

== Background and release ==
On 21 and 22 October 1982, Fleetwood Mac played the Forum in Inglewood, California as a part of the Mirage Tour. Mirage Tour '82 features 22 performances from both shows, spanning two discs. It features liner notes about the performances and the Mirage Tour written by Bill DeMain. Six of the album's 22 tracks were previously unreleased. The album was recorded on the Westwood One Mobile by Biff Dawes.

== Critical reception ==
Professional ratings
Review scores
Source	Rating
AllMusic	3.5/5 stars
PopMatters	5/10"
Under the Radar	7.5/10 stars

In an AllMusic review, critic Fred Thomas wrote it "represents the unabridged set list the band played on most nights of the tour". PopMatters critic John Bergstrom thought that the band sounded "more gritty and less disciplined than their studio counterparts", which resulted in "visceral power to the more rocking numbers", citing their renditions of "Oh Well" and "Second Hand News" as examples.

== Track listing ==
Disc one
No.	Title	Length
1.	"Second Hand News"	4:05
2.	"The Chain"	6:37
3.	"Don't Stop"	3:47
4.	"Dreams"	4:12
5.	"Oh Well"	4:32
6.	"Rhiannon"	7:04
7.	"Brown Eyes"	4:20
8.	"Eyes of the World"	4:07
9.	"Gypsy"	4:36
10.	"Love in Store"	3:19
11.	"Not That Funny"	9:06

Disc two
No.	Title	Length
1.	"Never Going Back Again"	4:24
2.	"Landslide"	4:13
3.	"Tusk"	5:57
4.	"Sara"	6:12
5.	"Hold Me"	4:14
6.	"You Make Loving Fun"	4;43
7.	"I'm So Afraid"	6:29
8.	"Go Your Own Way"	6:27
9.	"Blue Letter"	4:42
10.	"Sisters of the Moon"	8:03
11.	"Songbird"	3:33
Total length:		114:42

== Charts ==
Chart performance for Mirage Live '82
Chart (2024)	Peak position
German Albums (Offizielle Top 100)	55
Swiss Albums (Schweizer Hitparade)	90
Scottish Albums (Official Charts)	23
US Top Album Sales (Billboard)	29
US Indie Store Album Sales (Billboard)	13
