= 25 Years – The Chain =

Box set by Fleetwood Mac
- Released: 23 November 1992
- Recorded: 1967–1992
- Genre: Rock
- Length: 292:53; 150:55 (condensed version)
- Label: Warner Bros.
- Producer: Various

Fleetwood Mac chronology
Behind the Mask (1990)	25 Years – The Chain (1992)	Time (1995)

Professional ratings
Review scores
Source	Rating
AllMusic	3.5/5 stars

25 Years – The Chain is a box set by British-American rock band Fleetwood Mac originally released on 23 November 1992. The set contains four CDs, covering the history of the band from its formation in 1967 to 1992. A condensed two-disc edition of the collection was also released. In 2012, 25 Years – The Chain was reissued by Rhino Records, which reached number nine in the UK, number two in Australia and number one in New Zealand.

== Background ==
The set features four new tracks as well as several previously unreleased studio and live tracks from the archives, with several tracks included in alternate mixes. The four new songs were "Paper Doll", which was recorded earlier than the others as it was written by and recorded with Stevie Nicks and Rick Vito, both of whom had left the band in 1991, "Love Shines" and "Heart of Stone", both Christine McVie songs, and "Make Me a Mask", contributed by then-former member Lindsey Buckingham. "Make Me a Mask" originated from the recording sessions of Buckingham's third solo album, Out of the Cradle; Buckingham felt that the song did not fit with the rest of the album and instead gave the song to Fleetwood Mac for inclusion on the box set. "Love Shines" was released as a single to promote the box set in Europe, whereas "Paper Doll" was the single in North America and Australia.

The extended version of Stevie Nicks' "Gypsy" was also included for the first time on a commercial release, and this collection also marked the first time Nicks' "Silver Springs" had appeared on a full-length Fleetwood Mac album. "Silver Springs" was originally intended for inclusion on the international multi-million selling album Rumours, however, it was removed from the track listing at the last minute. Up until its inclusion on The Chain, the only other appearance of "Silver Springs" was on the B-side of "Go Your Own Way". Mick Fleetwood turned down Nicks' request to include "Silver Springs" on her retrospective compilation Timespace: The Best of Stevie Nicks as he had already selected the song for 25 Years – The Chain. The disagreement was ultimately resolved and the song itself was eventually released as a single five years later in 1997, taken from the live album The Dance. The track listing erroneously lists the first song on the fourth CD as "I Believe My Time Ain't Long", the band's first single from 1967, but it is actually the very similar "Dust My Broom" from the 1968 Mr. Wonderful album.

A condensed 2-CD box set, titled Selections from 25 Years – The Chain, was also released at the same time. The 2-CD version includes two tracks – "Bermuda Triangle" from 1974's Heroes Are Hard to Find and "Hold Me" from 1982's Mirage – which are not included on the 4-CD version.

On 11 June 2012, the 4-disc version of The Chain was re-released at a budget price. It peaked at no. 9 on the UK album charts the same week and has since been certified Gold by the BPI. The album reached no. 1 in New Zealand where it has since been certified 2× Platinum.

== Track listing ==
=== 25 Years – The Chain 4-disc edition ===
Disc 1
No.	Title	Writer(s)	Length
1.	"Paper Doll" (new song)	Stevie Nicks, Rick Vito, John Herron	3:56
2.	"Love Shines" (new song)	Christine McVie, Eddy Quintela	4:48
3.	"Stand Back (Live)" (audio from the Tango in the Night Tour video, 1988; original studio version on The Wild Heart, 1983)	Nicks	5:02
4.	"Crystal" (from Fleetwood Mac, 1975)	Nicks	5:09
5.	"Isn't It Midnight" (edited alternate version; originally from Tango in the Night, 1987)	C. McVie, Quintela, Lindsey Buckingham	4:02
6.	"Big Love" (from Tango in the Night, 1987)	Buckingham	3:39
7.	"Everywhere" (from Tango in the Night, 1987)	C. McVie	3:43
8.	"Affairs of the Heart" (from Behind the Mask, 1990)	Nicks	4:20
9.	"Heart of Stone" (new song)	C. McVie, Quintela	4:39
10.	"Sara" (from Tusk, 1979)	Nicks	6:26
11.	"That's All for Everyone" (from Tusk, 1979)	Buckingham	3:02
12.	"Over My Head" (from Fleetwood Mac, 1975)	C. McVie	3:34
13.	"Little Lies" (from Tango in the Night, 1987)	C. McVie, Quintela	3:38
14.	"Eyes of the World" (from Mirage, 1982)	Buckingham	3:42
15.	"Oh Diane" (from Mirage, 1982)	Buckingham, Richard Dashut	2:33
16.	"In the Back of My Mind" (from Behind the Mask, 1990)	Billy Burnette, David Malloy	7:00
17.	"Make Me a Mask" (new song)	Buckingham	4:02
Total length:			73:15

Disc 2
No.	Title	Writer(s)	Length
1.	"Save Me" (from Behind the Mask, 1990)	C. McVie, Quintela	4:14
2.	"Goodbye Angel" (previously unreleased from Mirage sessions, 1982)	Buckingham	3:06
3.	"Silver Springs" (B-side of "Go Your Own Way" single, 1976)	Nicks	4:29
4.	"What Makes You Think You're the One" (from Tusk, 1979)	Buckingham	3:30
5.	"Think About Me" (from Tusk, 1979)	C. McVie	2:40
6.	"Gypsy" (alternate full-length version; originally from Mirage, 1982)	Nicks	5:21
7.	"You Make Loving Fun" (from Rumours, 1977)	C. McVie	3:30
8.	"Second Hand News" (alternate mix; from Rumours, 1977)	Buckingham	2:50
9.	"Love in Store" (alternate mix; from Mirage, 1982)	C. McVie, Jim Recor	3:24
10.	"The Chain" (alternate mix; from Rumours, 1977)	C. McVie, Nicks, Buckingham, Mick Fleetwood, John McVie	4:20
11.	"Teen Beat" (previously unreleased from Mirage sessions, 1982)	Buckingham, Dashut	2:43
12.	"Dreams" (alternate mix; from Rumours, 1977)	Nicks	4:14
13.	"Only Over You" (from Mirage, 1982)	C. McVie	4:05
14.	"I'm So Afraid (Live)" (from Fleetwood Mac Live, 1980; original studio version on Fleetwood Mac, 1975)	Buckingham	7:27
15.	"Love Is Dangerous" (from Behind the Mask, 1990)	Nicks, Vito	3:16
16.	"Gold Dust Woman" (alternate mix; from Rumours, 1977)	Nicks	5:00
17.	"Not That Funny (Live)" (audio from Fleetwood Mac in Concert – Mirage Tour '82 video, 1982; original studio version on Tusk, 1979)	Buckingham	7:56
Total length:			72:05

Disc 3
No.	Title	Writer(s)	Length
1.	"Warm Ways" (from Fleetwood Mac, 1975)	C. McVie	3:50
2.	"Say You Love Me" (edit of single version; from Fleetwood Mac, 1975)	C. McVie	3:45
3.	"Don't Stop" (from Rumours, 1977)	C. McVie	3:11
4.	"Rhiannon" (from Fleetwood Mac, 1975)	Nicks	4:09
5.	"Walk a Thin Line" (from Tusk, 1979)	Buckingham	3:44
6.	"Storms" (from Tusk, 1979)	Nicks	5:27
7.	"Go Your Own Way" (from Rumours, 1977)	Buckingham	3:39
8.	"Sisters of the Moon" (from Tusk, 1979)	Nicks	4:37
9.	"Monday Morning (Live)" (from Fleetwood Mac Live, 1980; original studio version on Fleetwood Mac, 1975)	Buckingham	3:35
10.	"Landslide" (from Fleetwood Mac, 1975)	Nicks	3:16
11.	"Hypnotized" (from Mystery to Me, 1973)	Bob Welch	4:47
12.	"Lay It All Down" (alternate version; from Future Games, 1971)	Welch	4:34
13.	"Angel" (alternate mix; from Tusk, 1979)	Nicks	4:52
14.	"Beautiful Child" (alternate mix; from Tusk, 1979)	Nicks	5:18
15.	"Brown Eyes" (alternate version; from Tusk, 1979)	C. McVie	4:56
16.	"Save Me a Place" (from Tusk, 1979)	Buckingham	2:39
17.	"Tusk" (USC intro mix; from Tusk, 1979)	Buckingham	3:12
18.	"Never Going Back Again" (from Rumours, 1977)	Buckingham	2:02
19.	"Songbird" (from Rumours, 1977)	C. McVie	3:17
Total length:			74:50

Disc 4
No.	Title	Writer(s)	Length
1.	"I Believe My Time Ain't Long" (non-album single, 1967)	Jeremy Spencer	2:51
2.	"Need Your Love So Bad" (non-album single, 1968)	Little Willie John, Mertis John Jr.	3:53
3.	"Rattlesnake Shake" (from Then Play On, 1969)	Peter Green	3:29
4.	"Oh Well, Pt. 1" (original mono version; from Then Play On, 1969)	Green	3:29
5.	"Stop Messin' Round" (from Mr. Wonderful, 1968)	C.G. Adams, Green	2:19
6.	"The Green Manalishi (With the Two Prong Crown)" (non-album single, 1970)	Green	4:36
7.	"Albatross" (non-album single, 1968)	Green	3:11
8.	"Man of the World" (non-album single, 1969)	Green	2:51
9.	"Love That Burns" (from Mr. Wonderful, 1968)	Adams, Green	5:00
10.	"Black Magic Woman" (non-album single, 1968)	Green	2:54
11.	"Watch Out" (from Blues Jam at Chess, 1969)	Green	4:12
12.	"String-A-Long" (from Jeremy Spencer, 1970)	Robert Doyle, Jimmy Duncan	2:16
13.	"Station Man" (from Kiln House, 1970)	Danny Kirwan, J. McVie, Spencer	5:41
14.	"Did You Ever Love Me" (from Penguin, 1973)	C. McVie, Welch	3:40
15.	"Sentimental Lady" (from Bare Trees, 1972)	Welch	4:32
16.	"Come a Little Bit Closer" (from Heroes Are Hard to Find, 1974)	C. McVie	4:48
17.	"Heroes Are Hard to Find" (from Heroes Are Hard to Find, 1974)	C. McVie	3:34
18.	"Trinity" (previously unreleased from Bare Trees sessions, 1972)	Kirwan	4:07
19.	"Why" (from Mystery to Me, 1973)	C. McVie	4:55
Total length:			72:18

Although listed as "I Believe My Time Ain't Long" (non-album single, 1967), the first track on disc 4 is actually "Dust My Broom", the fourth track from Fleetwood Mac's second studio album Mr. Wonderful.

=== Selections from 25 Years – The Chain 2-disc edition ===
Released alongside the 4-CD box set was a 2-CD box set featuring selected tracks from the main set. This version also includes two tracks which are not included on the 4-CD box set; "Hold Me" and "Bermuda Triangle".

Disc 1
No.	Title	Writer(s)	Length
1.	"Paper Doll" (new song)	John Herron, Stevie Nicks, Rick Vito	3:57
2.	"Love Shines" (new song)	Christine McVie, Eddy Quintela	4:47
3.	"Love in Store" (alternative mix; from Mirage, 1982)	C. McVie, Jim Recor	3:23
4.	"Goodbye Angel" (previously unreleased from Mirage sessions, 1982)	Buckingham	3:07
5.	"Heart of Stone" (new song)	C. McVie, Quintela	4:39
6.	"Silver Springs" (B-side of "Go Your Own Way" single, 1976)	Nicks	4:29
7.	"Oh Diane" (from Mirage, 1982)	Buckingham, Richard Dashut	2:33
8.	"Big Love" (from Tango in the Night, 1987)	Buckingham	3:41
9.	"Rhiannon" (from Fleetwood Mac, 1975)	Nicks	4:10
10.	"Crystal" (from Fleetwood Mac, 1975)	Nicks	5:08
11.	"The Chain" (alternative mix; from Rumours, 1977)	Buckingham, Mick Fleetwood, C. McVie, John McVie, Nicks	4:19
12.	"Over My Head" (from Fleetwood Mac, 1975)	C. McVie	3:34
13.	"Dreams" (alternative mix; from Rumours, 1977)	Nicks	4:16
14.	"Go Your Own Way" (from Rumours, 1977)	Buckingham	3:40
15.	"Sara" (from Tusk, 1979)	Nicks	6:24
16.	"Hold Me" (from Mirage, 1982)	C. McVie	3:45
17.	"Gypsy" (alternative full-length version; originally from Mirage, 1982)	Nicks	5:21
18.	"Make Me a Mask" (new song)	Buckingham	4:01
Total length:			75:14

Disc 2
No.	Title	Writer(s)	Length
1.	"Don't Stop" (from Rumours, 1977)	C. McVie	3:11
2.	"Everywhere" (from Tango in the Night, 1987)	C. McVie	3:42
3.	"Tusk" (USC intro mix; from Tusk, 1979)	Buckingham	3:13
4.	"Not That Funny (Live)" (audio from Fleetwood Mac in Concert – Mirage Tour '82 video, 1982; original studio version on Tusk, 1979)	Buckingham	7:57
5.	"Beautiful Child" (alternative mix; from Tusk, 1979)	Nicks	5:20
6.	"Teen Beat" (previously unreleased from Mirage sessions, 1982)	Buckingham, Dashut	2:44
7.	"Need Your Love So Bad" (non-album single, 1968)	Little Willie John, Mertis John Jr.	3:54
8.	"Did You Ever Love Me" (from Penguin, 1973)	C. McVie, Welch	3:41
9.	"Oh Well, Pt. 1" (original mono version; from Then Play On, 1969)	Green	3:30
10.	"I Believe My Time Ain't Long" (non-album single, 1967)	Jeremy Spencer	2:52
11.	"Bermuda Triangle" (from Heroes Are Hard to Find, 1974)	Welch	4:09
12.	"Why" (from Mystery to Me, 1973)	C. McVie	4:56
13.	"Station Man" (from Kiln House, 1970)	Danny Kirwan, J. McVie, Spencer	5:41
14.	"Albatross" (non-album single, 1968)	Green	3:10
15.	"Black Magic Woman" (non-album single, 1968)	Green	2:52
16.	"Stop Messin' Round" (from Mr. Wonderful, 1968)	C.G. Adams, Green	2:21
17.	"Trinity" (previously unreleased from Bare Trees sessions, 1972)	Kirwan	4:08
18.	"Heroes Are Hard to Find" (from Heroes Are Hard to Find, 1974)	C. McVie	3:34
19.	"The Green Manalishi (With the Two Prong Crown)" (non-album single, 1970)	Green	4:36
Total length:			75:41

== Charts ==
=== Weekly charts ===
Chart (1993)	Peak position
Australian Albums (ARIA)	125
Dutch Albums (Album Top 100)	95

Chart (2012)	Peak position
UK Albums (Official Charts)	9

Chart (2013)	Peak position
Australian Albums (ARIA)	2
Belgian Albums (Ultratop Flanders)	103
New Zealand Albums (RMNZ)	1

=== Year-end charts ===
Chart (2012)	Position
UK Albums (OCC)	197
Chart (2013)	Position
Australian Albums (ARIA)	14

=== Decade-end charts ===
Chart (2010–2019)	Position
Australian Albums (ARIA)	69

== Certifications ==
Region	Certification	Certified units/sales
Australia (ARIA)	2× Platinum	140,000^{^}
New Zealand (RMNZ)	2× Platinum	30,000^{^}
United Kingdom (BPI) 2012 edition	Gold	100,000^{‡}
^{^} Shipments figures based on certification alone.^{‡} Sales+streaming figures based on certification alone.

== Credits ==
- Peter Green – guitars, vocals, banjo, bass guitar
- Jeremy Spencer – guitars, piano, vocals
- Danny Kirwan – guitars, vocals
- Bob Welch – guitars, vocals
- Bob Weston – electric guitars, acoustic guitars, slide guitar, vocals
- Mick Fleetwood – drums, percussion, harpsichord
- Stevie Nicks – vocals, tambourine, piano
- Lindsey Buckingham – guitars, banjo, dobro, charango, bass guitar, keyboards, drums, percussion, kalimba, programming, vocals
- Billy Burnette – guitars, dobro, vocals
- Rick Vito – guitars, vocals
- Christine McVie – keyboards, vibraphone, vocals
- John McVie – bass guitar
- Patrick Leonard – production on "Love Shines" and "Heart of Stone"
- Executive Producers – Mick Fleetwood and John McVie
- Anthology produced and engineered by Ken Caillat
- Historical research and co-ordination – Frank Harding
