= Mirage Tour =

1982 concert tour by Fleetwood Mac

- Tour by Fleetwood Mac
- Tour poster
- Associated album: Mirage
- Start date: September 1, 1982
- End date: October 31, 1982
- Legs: 1
- No. of shows: 32

Fleetwood Mac concert chronology
- Tusk Tour (1979–80); Mirage Tour (1982); Shake the Cage Tour (1987–88)

The Mirage Tour was a concert tour by British-American rock band Fleetwood Mac. The tour ran from September 1 to October 31, 1982. Unlike the 112-show Tusk Tour, the Mirage Tour was limited to just 29 cities in the United States.

== History ==
This would be the last tour with Lindsey Buckingham in the band until The Dance in 1997. Although Buckingham would perform on and co-produce the next album, Tango in the Night, he did not tour and left the band shortly after its completion. By the end of the Mirage Tour, Buckingham was "disillusioned with some of the collective priorities of the band."

In September, Fleetwood Mac performed at the US Festival in California, which earned the band $800,000 in one night. The October 21 and 22 shows at The Forum were released in 1984 in VHS (and later in DVD) under the title "Fleetwood Mac In Concert - Mirage Tour '82". The audio portion of this video was released, with two edits for time, as a bonus disc of the deluxe edition of Mirage, released September 23, 2016. Two songs from the October 21 show and one from October 22 would appear on a Super Deluxe edition of Fleetwood Mac Live released in 2021. The entire set from these concerts was released in 2024, under the title Fleetwood Mac - Mirage Tour '82.

== Set list ==
1. "Second Hand News"
2. "The Chain"
3. "Don't Stop"
4. "Dreams"
5. "Oh Well"
6. "Rhiannon"
7. "Brown Eyes"
8. "Eyes of the World"
9. "Gypsy"
10. "Love in Store"
11. "Not That Funny"
12. "Never Going Back Again"
13. "Landslide"
14. "Tusk"
15. "Sara"
16. "Hold Me"
17. "You Make Loving Fun"
18. "I'm So Afraid"
19. "Go Your Own Way"
  Encore
20. "Blue Letter"
21. "Sisters of the Moon"
22. "Songbird"

== Tour dates ==
Date	City	Country	Venue
North America
September 1, 1982	Greensboro	United States	Greensboro Coliseum
September 2, 1982	Atlanta	United States	Omni Coliseum
September 4, 1982	Orlando	United States	Citrus Bowl (Rock Superbowl Festival)
September 5, 1982	San Bernardino	United States	Glen Helen Regional Park (US Festival)
September 9, 1982	Lexington	United States	Rupp Arena
September 10, 1982	Norfolk	United States	Norfolk Scope
September 11, 1982	Philadelphia	United States	The Spectrum
September 14, 1982	East Rutherford	United States	Brendan Byrne Arena
September 15, 1982	Worcester	United States	The Centrum
September 18, 1982	Indianapolis	United States	Market Square Arena
September 19, 1982	Detroit	United States	Joe Louis Arena
September 22, 1982	East Troy	United States	Alpine Valley Music Theatre
September 23, 1982	Bloomington	United States	Met Center
September 26, 1982	Oklahoma City	United States	Myriad Convention Center
September 27, 1982	Houston	United States	The Summit
September 28, 1982	Dallas	United States	Reunion Arena
September 30, 1982	Tempe	United States	Compton Terrace Amphitheatre
October 3, 1982	Oakland	United States	Oakland-Alameda County Coliseum
October 7, 1982	Austin (rescheduled to October 31 due to vocal troubles with Stevie Nicks)	United States	Frank Erwin Center
October 9, 1982	Chapel Hill	United States	Carmichael Auditorium
October 10, 1982	East Troy	United States	Alpine Valley Music Theatre
October 12, 1982	Memphis	United States	Mid-South Coliseum
October 13, 1982	Baton Rouge	United States	LSU Assembly Center
October 15, 1982	Denver	United States	McNichols Sports Arena
October 17, 1982	Sacramento	United States	Cal Expo Amphitheatre
October 18, 1982	Irvine	United States	Irvine Meadows Amphitheatre
October 20, 1982	Oakland	United States	Oakland-Alameda County Coliseum
October 21, 1982	Inglewood	United States	The Forum
October 22, 1982	Inglewood	United States	The Forum
October 25, 1982	Cedar Falls	United States	UNI-Dome
October 26, 1982	Lincoln	United States	Pershing Auditorium
October 28, 1982	St. Louis	United States	Checkerdome
October 31, 1982	Austin	United States	Frank Erwin Center

== Personnel ==
- Mick Fleetwood – drums, percussion
- John McVie – bass guitar
- Christine McVie – Hammond B3 Organ, Yamaha CP-30, piano, accordion, maracas, tambourine, vocals
- Lindsey Buckingham – guitar, vocals
- Stevie Nicks – vocals, tambourine, cowbell

== Certifications ==
Region	Certification	Certified units/sales
Australia (ARIA) video	2× Platinum	30,000^{^}
^{^} Shipments figures based on certification alone.
