= Mirage (Fleetwood Mac album) =

1982 studio album by Fleetwood Mac

Studio album by Fleetwood Mac
- Released: 2 July 1982
- Recorded: Spring 1981 – March 1982
- Studios: Le Château (Hérouville, France); Larrabee Sound and Record Plant (both in Los Angeles, California)
- Genres: Pop rock; soft rock
- Length: 42:52
- Label: Warner Bros.
- Producers: Lindsey Buckingham; Richard Dashut; Ken Caillat; Fleetwood Mac

Fleetwood Mac chronology
| Live (1980) | Mirage (1982) | Tango in the Night (1987) |

Singles from Mirage
- 1. "Hold Me" Released: June 1982; 2. "Gypsy" Released: August 1982; 3. "Love in Store" Released: November 1982; 4. "Oh Diane" Released: December 1982; 5. "Can't Go Back" Released: April 1983

Mirage is the thirteenth studio album by the British and American rock band Fleetwood Mac, released on 2 July 1982 by Warner Bros. Records. This studio effort's soft rock sound stood in stark contrast to its more experimental predecessor, 1979's Tusk. Mirage yielded several singles: "Hold Me" (which peaked at number four on the US Billboard Pop Chart, remaining there for seven weeks), "Gypsy" (number 12 US Pop Chart), "Love in Store" (number 22 US Pop Chart), "Oh Diane" (number 9 in the UK), and "Can't Go Back" (number 83 in the UK). In addition, "Wish You Were Here" was released in Jamaica only, and topped the Jamaican singles chart.

== Background ==
After the completion of the worldwide Tusk Tour, the band took a year-long hiatus. During this time, Stevie Nicks, Mick Fleetwood, and Lindsey Buckingham each started solo careers, with Nicks achieving a multi-platinum, number-one success with 1981's Bella Donna. Ken Caillat, who reprised his role as producer after working with the band on Rumours and Tusk, remembered that there was a sense of rivalry between Nicks and Buckingham over the commercial trajectory of their solo careers.

Unlike the band's previous four albums, Fleetwood wanted the band to record Mirage outside of Los Angeles; he also sought to eschew the experimentation found on Tusk and instead replicate the commercial appeal of Rumours. To achieve this, Caillat scouted for potential studios and came across Château d'Hérouville in France. The band agreed to record at the facility, although Caillat said that certain members, particularly Nicks and Buckingham, were difficult to work with. The band hired a chef to cook meals for them, but Caillat said that Buckingham and Nicks would complain about the food and the lack of television. In an attempt to appease them, Caillat brought two video machines with taped baseball games to Château d'Hérouville .

== Recording ==
The band spent five weeks recording at Château D'Hérouville and finished the album in California a few months later. In the interim, Buckingham completed his Law and Order solo album. By September 1981, Fleetwood remarked in an interview with Cleveland Scene that the band was "more than halfway finished" with Mirage. He mentioned that the band originally wanted the album out by November, but said that a release around the New Year was more likely.

On the production and engineering level, Caillat sought to produce an album that sounded better than Rumours. In an interview published in the 28 November edition of Record World, Buckingham said that the band had accumulated 20 songs, including a cover of "Blue Monday". At the time, he said that Mirage "definitely [had] a spirit of experimentation; you're going to hear some sounds that are definitely far beyond Rumours. He believed that the arrangements and vocals were "a group effort" and called McVie's material "some of the classiest I've heard from her yet."

In the liner notes for the 2016 deluxe edition of Mirage, Nicks mentioned that the band worked at multiple Los Angeles recording studios to complete the album and was unsure how much work was conducted after they left Château D'Hérouville. Caillat stated in a 1982 interview that Nicks' involvement with Mirage was largely limited to the initial recording sessions at Château d'Hérouville and said that she spent between ten and fifteen days at various Los Angeles studios for further overdubs.

Most of the recording sessions were attended by Caillat, Dashut, Buckingham, Fleetwood, and Christine McVie. Buckingham said that Fleetwood provided feedback to the proceedings when he identified problems with the mix. He also described the album's backing vocals as "fairly lush at times, a sort of space-age forties' feel." Following the release of Mirage, Christine McVie reflected on the material with Sandy Robertson of Sounds magazine.

There's nothing weird on it at all, there's no little hidden goblins anywhere, it's all straightforward simple rock'n roll songs...These songs are an awful lot happier.

— Christine McVie

== Composition ==
In a 1981 interview with BAM magazine, Nicks reported that her original three submissions for Mirage were "That's Alright" (with the working title "It's Alright"), "If You Were My Love", and "Smile at You", although she said that Buckingham encouraged her to replace the latter song with a different composition. Nicks agreed with Buckingham, stating that "It's kind of a bitter song and that's really not where any of us are at right now, even though it's a wonderful song. My songs don't take long to record, so it shouldn't be a problem." "Smile at You" later appeared on Fleetwood Mac's 2003 album, Say You Will.

The Nicks-penned "Gypsy" was the second single from the album and was accompanied by a video directed by Russell Mulcahy. Nicks wrote "Gypsy" in 1979 and considered it for her Bella Donna solo album, but she ultimately saved it for Mirage. Of the other two compositions from Nicks on the album, "That's Alright", which was one of the three songs she originally submitted for inclusion on Mirage, dated back to the Buckingham Nicks days of 1974, while "Straight Back" was written in the winter of 1981. "Straight Back" referred to her separation from then-lover, producer Jimmy Iovine and the disruption she experienced to her newly established solo career in order to rejoin Fleetwood Mac for Mirage.

Of Christine McVie's four compositions, three were written in collaboration with other writers: "Love in Store" with Jim Recor, ex-husband of Nicks' friend Sara Recor who later married Mick Fleetwood, "Hold Me" with singer-songwriter Robbie Patton whose second album she had recently produced and "Wish You Were Here" with lyrics from erstwhile John Mayall drummer Colin Allen. The other, "Only Over You", was credited "With thanks to Dennis Wilson for inspiration." McVie had recently ended her relationship with Wilson, a member of the Beach Boys, who would die by drowning the following year.

Buckingham entered the recording studio with "Can't Go Back" and "Eyes of the World", while his other three songs on the album were written shortly after his arrival in France. Three of his five contributions were written with co-producer Richard Dashut including the UK top-10 single "Oh Diane", which started with a chord progression on a seven-foot Yamaha grand piano played by Dashut in Buckingham's living room. Buckingham then took the chord progression and turned it into a complete song. Dashut wrote the basic riff for "Empire State", which Buckingham then further developed on the electric guitar. Buckingham also played a 19th-century lap harp on "Empire State"; the instrument was given to him by Fleetwood. On "Book of Love", Buckingham sang all of the parts on the chorus and experimented with different tape speeds to achieve different vocal timbres. McVie commented that Buckingham overdubbed some of the song's vocals to a slowed-down recording and later sped it up, with the result resembling Nicks' voice. Dashut was responsible for the song's lyrics, which he wrote about the dissolution of his romantic relationship with Pamela Sue Martin.

Buckingham assembled "Eyes of the World" in a piecemeal manner starting with a series of chords. He then spliced together additional musical passages, including the chord progression of Pachelbel's Canon and the acoustic guitar part from an instrumental composition on Buckingham Nicks. In a 1981 interview with Record World, Buckingham said that there was an uptempo track on Mirage that he originally planned to include on his Law and Order solo album; he rationalised that he "couldn't just save the best stuff" for Law and Order and said that "anything that seemed particularly suited for Fleetwood Mac should be used." He described the song as a cross between "Go Your Own Way" and "Second Hand News".

== Release ==
In February 1982, Chris Connelly reported that the album carried the tentative title of Mirage. At the time of the announcement, the song titles had yet to be finalised; Connelly said that one track would be a Christine McVie tune "with a decidedly country edge to it". He also reported that the cover art would be done by George Hurrell, who also did the cover art for Buckingham's solo album Law and Order. A tentative release date of March was planned for Mirage at the time of the announcement. A few months later, the release date was pushed back to 9 June 1982 and a tour was scheduled to begin in August. The press release stated that David Puttnam would produce a Fleetwood Mac concert film that would be broadcast on cable television and issued on home video. A set of promotional videos were also planned to elicit interest in the album.

Record Business announced in its 21 June 1982 publication that Mirage would be released on 2 July in the United Kingdom by WEA and that the label would coordinate with WHSmith for a "heavy national press advertising campaign". WEA augmented these promotional efforts with point of sale displays that included posters and dump bins. Cassettes of the album were manufactured on chrome dioxide and pressed at the company's pressing plant in Alsdorf, Germany.

The album returned the group to the top of the US Billboard charts for the first time since their 1977 album Rumours, spending five weeks at number one. It spent a total of 18 weeks in the US top ten and has been certified double platinum for shipments in excess of two million copies in the US. It also reached number five in the UK where it has been certified platinum for shipping 300,000 copies, and number two in Australia.

== Critical reception ==
Professional ratings
Review scores
| Source | Rating |
|---|---|
| AllMusic | 3/5 stars |
| Blender | 3/5 stars |
| Classic Rock | 3.5/5 stars |
| The Guardian | 4/5 stars |
| The Philadelphia Inquirer | 4/5 stars |
| Pitchfork | 8.5/10 |
| Rolling Stone | 4/5 stars |
| The Rolling Stone Album Guide | 3/5 stars |
| Uncut | 7/10 |
| The Village Voice | B+ |

Billboard commended the efforts of all three songwriters for "contributing their strongest songs yet." They said that the album demonstrated Buckingham's capabilities as an arranger, particularly in regards to the vocal harmonies, which they felt were evocative of the Beach Boys' best work. Cashbox wrote that the "perky, upbeat energy and soaring vocals that have come to be identified as the Fleetwood Mac sound are abundantly evident" on Mirage, which they felt marked a return to the production and stylistic choices found on Rumours.

In The Boston Phoenix, Ken Emerson wrote that "For all its pleasant tunefulness, Mirage (Warner Bros.) is not a retreat to the tried-and-true pop format of Fleetwood Mac and Rumours. Neither, despite its avante-garde oddities, does it surrender to the incoherence of Tusk. Rather, it’s a winning synthesis of the best of both worlds... Mirage represents yet another metamorphosis; certainly Fleetwood Mac's most delightful album, it may also be the most rewarding." Sandy Robertson of Sounds thought that the album bore a "superficial resemblance" to Rumours and also believed that Christine McVie's "Hold Me" and "Only Over You" were the best songs on Mirage.

Writing for BAM magazine, Blair Jackson rejected the notion that Mirage was a Rumours, Part II, instead believing that the album shared some similarities to Tusk. Jackson said that "while there doesn't seem to be the same degree of instrumental experimentation on Mirage [compared to Tusk], this is by no means a conventional-sounding record." He credited Buckingham for the album's "incredible musical inventiveness" and labeled his songs as the most interesting, particularly highlighting the production choices on "Eyes of the World" with its multitracked guitars and vocal harmonies. Jackson thought that the album lacked a "dynamite tune" that was at the same caliber of the material on Rumours and Tusk and thought that the contributions of the rhythm section failed to capture the energy found on the band's earlier releases. He also described Nicks' three songs as "strangely unsatisfying", calling "Gypsy" a re-write of "Sara" and dismissing "That's Alright" and "Straight Back" as uninspired. Jackson ultimately felt that Mirage represented Fleetwood Mac "nearly [at] the top of their form".

=== Response from the band ===
Following the release of Mirage, Buckingham told Rolling Stone that he rejected the premise that the album was a Rumours redux and also characterised Mirage as "a more conservative album". In a different interview with the Chicago Tribune, Buckingham called Mirage "a fairly progressive album" in terms of the production and thought that "Gypsy" and "Eyes of the World" most exemplified this.

In 1987, Buckingham dismissed Mirage as "safe" and "uninspiring". Christine McVie also expressed reservations with Mirage and believed that it "supplied the public with what they were expecting" from Fleetwood Mac. She also called the album a "wimpy Rumours" and said "there were a few good songs on [Mirage], but the overall impact was superficial." Fleetwood commented that the band approached Mirage as a more traditional album and said that they would "never go there again in terms of playing it safe."

== Mirage Tour video ==
Two of the final shows of the Mirage tour were filmed in Los Angeles in 1982 at the The Forum. Originally released on VHS and CED videodisc in 1983, many tracks were edited out, with the loss of "Second Hand News", "Don't Stop", "Dreams", "Brown Eyes", "Oh Well", "Never Going Back Again", "Landslide", "Sara", and "Hold Me", reducing the 135 minute show to just 80 minutes on cassette. Three tracks from their performance at The Forum, "Second Hand News," "Brown Eyes," and "Hold Me" would later be officially released on the expanded 1980 Fleetwood Mac Live album in 2021.

An album of recordings culled from Fleetwood Mac's October 1982 performance at The Forum was released in 2024 under the title Mirage Tour '82. The collection contained 22 tracks, six of which had been previously unreleased.

== Deluxe edition ==
A deluxe edition of Mirage was released on 23 September 2016. This expanded reissue features a remaster of the original album, 13 live tracks, B-sides, outtakes, plus other songs that did not make the final cut. Some of these songs include "Goodbye Angel" and "Teen Beat", which were both released on 25 Years: The Chain, and "Smile at You", later released on Say You Will. "If You Were My Love" was later released on Stevie Nicks' solo album 24 Karat Gold: Songs from the Vault.

The DVD-Audio disc contains both the 5.1 Surround and 24/96 Stereo Audio mixes of the original album. Caillat had originally acquired the master tapes several years prior to the release of the deluxe edition of Mirage for the purpose of creating a 5.1 surround mix on DVD. He said that tapes for Mirage "were really messy...I pulled those tapes out of the vault and they'd basically turned into icky, sticky crap. Like pitch from trees."

== Track listing ==
Side one
| No. | Title | Writer(s) | Lead vocals | Length |
|---|---|---|---|---|
| 1. | "Love in Store" | Christine McVie; Jim Recor | C. McVie | 3:14 |
| 2. | "Can't Go Back" | Lindsey Buckingham | Buckingham | 2:42 |
| 3. | "That's Alright" | Stevie Nicks | Nicks | 3:09 |
| 4. | "Book of Love" | Buckingham; Richard Dashut | Buckingham | 3:21 |
| 5. | "Gypsy" | Nicks | Nicks | 4:24 |
| 6. | "Only Over You" | C. McVie | C. McVie | 4:08 |

Side two
| No. | Title | Writer(s) | Lead vocals | Length |
|---|---|---|---|---|
| 1. | "Empire State" | Buckingham; Dashut | Buckingham | 2:51 |
| 2. | "Straight Back" | Nicks | Nicks | 4:17 |
| 3. | "Hold Me" | C. McVie; Robbie Patton | C. McVie; Buckingham | 3:44 |
| 4. | "Oh Diane" | Buckingham; Dashut | Buckingham | 2:33 |
| 5. | "Eyes of the World" | Buckingham | Buckingham | 3:44 |
| 6. | "Wish You Were Here" | Music: C. McVie; Lyrics: Colin Allen | C. McVie | 4:45 |
| Total length: | | | | 42:52 |

== Personnel ==
Adapted from the album's liner notes.

Fleetwood Mac

- Lindsey Buckingham – guitars, vocals, additional keyboards, lap harp (on "Empire State")
- Stevie Nicks – vocals
- Christine McVie – keyboards, vocals
- John McVie – bass guitar
- Mick Fleetwood – drums, percussion

Additional musician

- Ray Lindsey – additional guitar (on "Straight Back")

Production

- Lindsey Buckingham; Richard Dashut; Ken Caillat; Fleetwood Mac – producers
- Ken Caillat; Richard Dashut – engineers
- Carla Frederick; Dennis Mays – assistant engineers
- David Bianco – additional engineering (at Record Plant)
- Sabrina Buchanek – additional engineering (at Larrabee Sound)
- Boa – additional engineering (at Le Chateau)
- Stephen Marcussen; Larry Emerine – mastering (at Precision Lacquer, Hollywood)
- Ray Lindsey; Tony Todaro; Dennis Dunstan – studio crew
- Wayne Cody; Dwayne Taylor; Debbie Alsbury; Dennis Keen – additional crew in France
- Madame Wong – S.C.O.E.
- Nancy Buckingham – title
- Chris James – immersive (ATMOS) mixing
- Brad Blackwood – immersive (ATMOS) mixing

Design

- Larry Vigon – art direction, design and concept, inner sleeve penguin illustration
- George Hurrell – album cover photography
- Mac James – painting on cover photograph
- Lindsey Buckingham – inner sleeve artwork
- Christie Thomason – make-up
- Ellene Warren and Pleasure Dome, Los Angeles – wardrobe

== Charts ==
=== Weekly charts ===
Weekly chart performance for Mirage
| Chart (1982) | Peak position |
|---|---|
| Australia Albums (Kent Music Report) | 2 |
| Canada Top Albums/CDs (RPM) | 5 |
| Dutch Albums (Album Top 100) | 6 |
| German Albums (Offizielle Top 100) | 12 |
| Iceland Albums (Íslenski Listinn) | 1 |
| Japanese Albums (Oricon) | 40 |
| New Zealand Albums (RMNZ) | 13 |
| Norwegian Albums (VG-lista) | 2 |
| Spanish Albums (AFYVE) | 17 |
| Swedish Albums (Sverigetopplistan) | 10 |
| UK Albums (Official Charts) | 5 |
| US Billboard 200 | 1 |
| US Cash Box Top 200 Albums | 1 |

Weekly chart performance for Mirage (2016 reissue)
| Chart (2016) | Peak position |
|---|---|
| Belgian Albums (Ultratop Flanders) | 71 |
| Belgian Albums (Ultratop Wallonia) | 85 |
| Dutch Albums (Album Top 100) | 63 |
| French Albums (SNEP) | 83 |
| German Albums (Offizielle Top 100) | 40 |
| Irish Albums (IRMA) | 63 |
| Scottish Albums (Official Charts) | 30 |
| Swiss Albums (Schweizer Hitparade) | 91 |
| UK Albums (Official Charts) | 41 |
| US Top Catalog Albums (Billboard) | 20 |
| US Indie Store Album Sales (Billboard) | 15 |

=== Year-end charts ===
1982 year-end chart performance for Mirage
| Chart (1982) | Position |
|---|---|
| Australian Albums (Kent Music Report) | 9 |
| Canada Top Albums/CDs (RPM) | 21 |
| Dutch Albums (Album Top 100) | 42 |
| German Albums (Offizielle Top 100) | 44 |
| New Zealand Albums (RMNZ) | 45 |
| UK Albums (BMRB) | 44 |
| US Billboard 200 | 24 |
| US Cash Box Top 200 Albums | 4 |

1983 year-end chart performance for Mirage
| Chart (1983) | Position |
|---|---|
| US Billboard 200 | 88 |

== Certifications ==
Certifications for Mirage
| Region | Certification | Certified units/sales |
|---|---|---|
| Australia (ARIA) | 2× Platinum | 140,000^{^} |
| Canada (Music Canada) | Platinum | 100,000^{^} |
| France (SNEP) | Gold | 100,000^{*} |
| Germany (BVMI) | Gold | 250,000^{^} |
| New Zealand (RMNZ) | Platinum | 15,000^{‡} |
| Spain (Promusicae) | Gold | 50,000^{^} |
| United Kingdom (BPI) | Platinum | 300,000^{^} |
| United States (RIAA) | 2× Platinum | 2,000,000^{^} |
^{*} Sales figures based on certification alone.^{^} Shipments figures based on certification alone.^{‡} Sales+streaming figures based on certification alone.
