= Oh Diane =

Single by Fleetwood Mac

from the album Mirage
- B-side: "Only Over You", "The Chain" [12"] (UK) / "That's Alright" (USA)
- Released: December 1982 (UK): February 1983 (US)
- Recorded: 1981–1982
- Genre: Pop
- Length: 2:33
- Label: Warner Bros.
- Songwriters: Lindsey Buckingham, Richard Dashut
- Producers: Lindsey Buckingham, Richard Dashut, and Fleetwood Mac

Fleetwood Mac UK singles chronology
| "Gypsy" (1982) | "Oh Diane" (1982) | "Can't Go Back" (1983) |

Fleetwood Mac US singles chronology
| "Love in Store" (1982) | "Oh Diane" (1983) | "Big Love" (1987) |

"Oh Diane" is a song by British-American rock group Fleetwood Mac. It was written by guitarist Lindsey Buckingham and Richard Dashut for the 1982 album Mirage, the fourth album by the band with Buckingham. It was the third single released from the album in Europe and reached the top ten in the UK. "Oh Diane" was also issued as the album's fourth single in North America after "Love in Store".

== Background ==
"Oh Diane" is one of the three songs on Mirage that Buckingham co-wrote with Richard Dashut, who developed the chord progression on a grand piano in Hérouville. Billy Burnette, who later joined Fleetwood Mac to replace Buckingham, said in a 2022 interview with Rolling Stone that he assisted with some of the lyrics for "Oh Diane". In 1982, Buckingham had asked Burnette to accompany him for a performance on Saturday Night Live; around that time, the two began writing material together. Buckingham was not pleased with the lyrics that Burnette generated for "Oh Diane", but Burnette maintained that some of his lyrics were still used. The liner notes for Mirage do not list Burnette as a co-writer.

== Release ==
Despite the previous two singles from the album ("Hold Me" and "Gypsy") being unsuccessful in the United Kingdom, the song became a hit there when released in December 1982. It charted at number 69 on 18 December 1982 and took 10 weeks to gradually climb the chart, peaking at number 9 in February 1983, helping to push its parent album Mirage into the Top 10. The song took on special meaning in the UK as it was just the previous year that Prince Charles and Princess Diana had married.

The sleeve for "Oh Diane" saw the band return to using the penguin trademark in a nod to the band's earlier years; their 1973 album was called Penguin. "Oh Diane" was released in Britain on 7" and 12", with "The Chain" being featured on the 12" editions. Record Business announced in the 31 January 1983 edition of its publication that the single would be issued in a picture disc format that same week. In February, WEA launched a two-week marketing campaign intended to bolster sales in its catalogue by discounting six singles. "Oh Diane" was one of the six songs included in this discount program, which reduced the price of the single to 99 pence and providing a 50 pence voucher against the cost of its parent album, Mirage. WEA also planned to promote the single in a two-and-a-half minute advert on the Channel 4 rock program, The Tube.

In the US, another track from Mirage, "Love in Store", was released as the third single instead and reached number 22 on the Billboard Hot 100. "Oh Diane" was therefore the fourth single issued in the US; it was released in February 1983, but failed to chart on the Billboard Hot 100. However, it did become a minor hit on the American Adult Contemporary chart, peaking at number 35. Despite being a Top 10 hit in the UK, "Oh Diane" does not appear on the 2002 UK version of the album, The Very Best of Fleetwood Mac (or the 2009 re-issue), although it was included on 2018's 50 Years – Don't Stop. Despite charting in Europe, "Oh Diane" was never performed live in concert.

== Critical reception ==
Writing for Sounds, Sandy Robertson described the song as "Bobby Vintonesque in its unashamed schoolboy schlockiness." In a retrospective review of Mirage, Clark Collis from Blender labelled "Oh Diane" as one of the album's standout tracks along with "Hold Me". Rolling Stone ranked the song number 33 on its list of the 50 greatest Fleetwood Mac songs.

== Track listings ==
In the UK, "Oh Diane" was released as the band's first 12” single featuring the additional b-side track "The Chain" from the 1977 album Rumours.

UK 7" single (Warner Brothers Records FLEET 1)

1. "Oh Diane" – 2:33
2. "Only Over You" – 4:08

UK 12" single (Warner Brothers Records FLEET 1)

1. "Oh Diane" – 2:33
2. "Only Over You" – 4:08
3. "The Chain" – 4:28

US 7" single (Warner Brothers Records 7–29698)

1. "Oh Diane" – 2:33
2. "That’s Alright" – 3:09

== Personnel ==
- Lindsey Buckingham – guitars, keyboards, lead and backing vocals
- Mick Fleetwood – drums, tambourine
- John McVie – bass guitar
- Christine McVie – backing vocals

== Chart positions ==
| Chart (1982–1983) | Peak position |
|---|---|
| Canada Adult Contemporary (RPM) | 27 |
| German Singles Chart | 46 |
| Irish Singles Chart | 8 |
| UK Singles Chart | 9 |
| US Billboard Adult Contemporary | 35 |
