= Team Boo =

Studio album by Mates of State
- Released: September 16, 2003
- Genre: Indie pop
- Length: 40:10
- Label: Polyvinyl
- Producers: John Croslin, Jim Eno

Mates of State chronology
Our Constant Concern (2002)	Team Boo (2003)	Bring It Back (2006)

Team Boo is the third album by American indie pop duo Mates of State. It was released on September 16, 2003, by Polyvinyl Records. The album was produced by Jim Eno of American indie rock band Spoon and John Croslin, who produced the duo's debut album My Solo Project.

== Critical reception ==
Professional ratings
Review scores
Source	Rating
AllMusic	4.5/5 stars
Robert Christgau	B+
Pitchfork	7.3/10
Rolling Stone	3/5 stars

Team Boo garnered positive reviews from music critics. Tim Sendra of AllMusic praised the album's upbeat production and the vocal work of Gardner and Hammel giving life and exuberance to even slower tracks like "Parachutes (Funeral Song)" and "An Experiment", saying that "Team Boo is a record that will make even the staunchest nonbelievers believe in the power of simply played, honest, and energetic pop music again." Pitchfork writer Rob Mitchum said that despite some slow-placed tracks, the album was a return to form into My Solo Project territory thanks to the production work of John Croslin and Jim Eno leading them there, saying that "Team Boo turns out to be a surprisingly respectable junior-year effort-- one that puts Mates of State in the small minority of indie-pop bands that don't fall under the one-album-and-out rule." Mackenzie Wilson of Rolling Stone praised the duo's elegant and idiosyncratic musicianship complementing their vocal harmonies, saying that "Gardner's girlish vocals snugly wrap around her husband's boyish charm, letting on to Mates of State's genuine love for music as well as for one another."

== Track listing ==
No.	Title	Length
1.	"Ha Ha"	2:59
2.	"Whiner's Bio"	2:32
3.	"Fluke"	2:48
4.	"Open Book"	3:39
5.	"Middle Is Gold"	4:24
6.	"The Kissaway"	3:39
7.	"Gotta Get a Problem"	2:42
8.	"Parachutes (Funeral Song)"	3:47
9.	"An Experiment"	4:15
10.	"Sound It Off"	3:24
11.	"I Got This Feelin'"	3:07
12.	"Separate the People"	2:54
