= Think Long =

Think Long may refer to:

- "Think Long," a song by Modest Mouse from their 2001 album Sad Sappy Sucker
- "Think Long," a song by Mates of State from their 2006 album Bring It Back
