= Julienne Taylor =

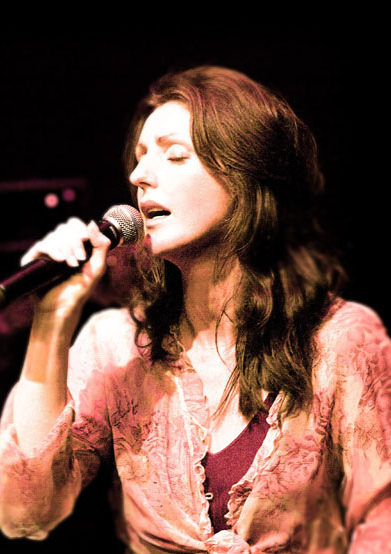
- Julienne Taylor (2009)

Background information
- Genres: Pop, folk, celtic music, easy listening
- Occupations: Singer-songwriter, musician
- Instrument: Vocals
- Years active: 2000–present
- Labels: evosound, Virgin Records, Streamline, The Music Kitchen
- Website: juliennetaylor.com

Julienne Taylor is a Scottish singer and songwriter who has been hailed as "Scotland’s best female voice since Annie Lennox".

== Early life ==
Julienne, daughter of Andrew and Jane, was raised in the surrounding Stirlingshire area.

Family gatherings were often a musical affair during her early upbringing, but it would be sport that would ignite Julienne's passion in her early childhood. This would be something to which she would return to following a serious car crash in which she damaged her back, resulting in her taking constant pain relief medication for an approximate 18-month period. Julienne would determine to successfully remedy this through exercise, which would later see her qualify as a personal fitness trainer and Pilates instructor.

While at high school Julienne would regularly make trips to London to visit friends and attend gigs at the world famous Marquee Club in Wardour Street. A few years later she would spend many more nights at this venue, while working for a Shepperton Studios based sound and lighting company who provided engineers and equipment to this venue.

== Musical career ==
Taylor played in various bands during high school and studied dance and expressive mime in Edinburgh. She moved to London to pursue a career in music and worked at Shepperton Studios as backing vocalist. A serious car crash causing multiple injuries forced her to pursue a career in studio engineering career.

Her first album was named Racing the Clouds Home in homage to Marillion, the words coming from the song White Russian on their album Clutching at Straws.

In 2001, whilst working with an Edinburgh based independent label, and following a series of successful live performances at the Edinburgh Festival, Julienne was signed to Virgin Records. In 2008 she signed to Hong Kong based Evolution Ltd. on their evosound label. She recorded a new album in Edinburgh, Scotland in between October and December 2010. The album was produced by Stuart Wood and Gordon Campbell the production team responsible for her previous album releases.

Julienne's debut headline concert took place on 24 September at the Lyric Theatre – The Hong Kong Academy for Performing Arts featuring The Celtic Connection. The concert was released in CD in late 2012 and on DVD and Blu-ray in late 2013. Julienne returned to Asia for concerts with the legendary folk singer Judy Collins on 2 September 2013 at The Sun Yat-sen Memorial Hall (Taipei) and 3 September 2013 at the Y-Theatre, Hong Kong.

== South East Asia ==
=== South Korea ===
The song "Love Hurts" from her album Music Garden, became a regularly played song on South Korean radio and together with a promotional drive on TV, advertising billboards and magazines the Music Garden album sold well. When asked by the Daily Record newspaper in Scotland about her success in Korea Julie said "It's fantastic but I still find it incredibly bizarre. I don't even know what type of music people listen to in South Korea but it must be similar to the stuff I do."

The release of her album A Time For Love in 2008 sold over 10,000 CD's in S.E. Asia with strong sales in Hong Kong, Taiwan, Singapore, Indonesia and Thailand. Julienne's debut live performance in S.E. Asia took place as the special guest to John Ford Coley at the Shouson Theatre, Hong Kong on 19 June 2009.

=== The Heart Within ===
The new album, The Heart Within, of new wave & classic love songs and original songs co-written with producers Gordon Campbell and Stuart Wood was released in Hong Kong on 29 July 2011. Her debut headline concert was also announced to take place on 24 September 2011 at the Lyric Theatre, The Hong Kong Academy for Performing Arts, Hong Kong.

=== When We Are One ===
In When We Are One, Julienne Taylor recorded with Italian guitarist Daniele Ferretti and border pipes artist Fraser Fifield again in Italy, US and UK. It included three original songs which were composed by Julienne Taylor and Daniele Ferretti "Toybox","Dancing for The Oceans", "Umbrellas in The Rain". The project was recorded, mixed, mastered in 96khz/24bit with the producer Marco Di Giangiacomo in Italy and released on CD and SACD format.

== Personal life ==
Taylor resides near Bath in the South West of England.

== Discography ==
Album title	Release date	Label
Racing The Clouds Home	28 November 2000	Virgin Records
Music Garden	15 September 2003	The Music Kitchen
Songs to the Siren	2007	The Music Kitchen
A Time For Love	12 May 2008	Evosound
The Heart Within	28 July 2011	Evosound
Live at Lyric	2 December 2012	Evosound
When We Are One	9 December 2016	Evosound

=== Singles ===
Title	Release date	Label
"Like A Rolling Stone"	1995	Streamline Records
"Just Let Me Be"	2001	Virgin Records
"Second Hand News"	2002	R2/Virgin Records
"Two Notes (To Say That I Miss You)"	2017	Evosound

=== Soundtracks ===
Movie Title	Release date	Soundtrack
Another Nine & a Half Weeks	12 June 1997	Why Did You Do It

== See also ==
- Caledonia
