= The Rumperbutts =

- Theatrical Poster
- Directed by: Marc Brener
- Written by: Marc Brener
- Produced by: Marc Brener; Dena Hysell
- Starring: Kori Gardner; Jason Hammel; Josh Brener; Vanessa Ray; Arian Moayed
- Music by: Mates of State
- Distributed by: Mance Media
- Release date: May 22, 2015
- Running time: 91 minutes
- Country: United States
- Language: English

The Rumperbutts is a 2015 American musical comedy written and directed by Marc Brener, starring Kori Gardner and Jason Hammel of the indie pop duo Mates of State, as well as Vanessa Ray, Josh Brener and Arian Moayed. Marc Brener and Dena Hysell, of Rumpus Room Productions, are the producers of the film. The film is distributed by Mance Media and was released theatrically on May 22, 2015. The film was also released in HD and 4K Ultra HD formats.

== Plot ==
Financially struggling, a married indie band duo regretfully takes a job on a children's show, The Rumperbutts. Despite the money and success, they are miserable. However, on one magical evening, a mysterious man appears and gives them a second chance at happiness.

== Cast ==
- Kori Gardner as Bonnie
- Jason Hammel as Jack
- Josh Brener as Richie
- Vanessa Ray as Ashlee
- Arian Moayed as Gavin

== Production ==
The Rumperbutts started as a Kickstarter project in 2013. Shooting took place in October 2013.

The Rumperbutts was shot in various locations in Connecticut during the fall of 2013 over the course of 14 days. The film is director Marc Brener's first feature, which he began to write just after the success of his short film Say It Ain't Solo (Best of Fest and Best Direction 2012 LA Comedy Festival).

During production, the Metro North line between New York and Connecticut broke down. Since most of the cast was New York-based, one crew member was pulled off all other duties to spend all their time figuring out what trains were running when, and to where, and how to get Vanessa Ray back to the city to shoot an episode of Blue Bloods at 7 AM when she had been on set until midnight.

Sending the actors down the street in full costume attracted a crowd, which then had to be dispersed by the crew in order to shoot. People were curious what the colorful furry creatures were, asking, "What is a Rumperbutt?" The film used this phrase as part of the promotional campaign.

In New Haven, at the Yale club Toad's, a number of extras didn't show up, making it look empty. The production team made calls, trying to recruit anyone they knew in the area, because the club needed to be packed in order for the scene to work. A group of 60-70 student huggers appeared outside, and the first Assistant Director convinced them to come inside and see a free Mates of State show for a couple of hours. He didn't tell them it would be the same song played repeatedly, but he managed to wrangle them inside for an hour so that the scene could be filled with people.

== Soundtrack ==
The Rumperbutts Soundtrack, written by Marc Brener and Mates of State, was released in May 2015. Mates of State had previously worked with Brener on a short film, and he contacted them to score his film, before ultimately casting them as the stars of the film.

1. "Hope" – Mates of State
2. "I Know I Knew" – Mates of State
3. "Someone Like You" – Mates of State
4. "Rock Bottom" – Mates of State
5. "You Can't Undo" – Mates of State
6. "Chemistry Attack" – Mates of State
7. "Not Sure What We Needed" – Mates of State
8. "I'm Sorry" – Mates of State
9. "Going for Gold" – Music by Mates of State; Performed by Arian Moayed and Vanessa Ray
10. "Rumperbutts Theme Song" – Mates of State
11. "When Mommy Says No" – Mates of State
12. "Hope" (Live @ Toad's Place) – Live Performance by Mates of State, Josh Brener, John Panos and Nancy Matlack

== Release ==
Rumperbutts was released on May 22, 2015.
