= Re-Arrange Us =

Studio album by Mates of State
- Released: May 20, 2008
- Genre: Indie pop
- Length: 35:40
- Label: Barsuk
- Producer: Mates of State; Peter Katis

Mates of State chronology
Bring It Back (2006)	Re-Arrange Us (2008)	Crushes (The Covers Mixtape) (2010)

Re-Arrange Us is the fifth studio album by American indie pop duo Mates of State. It was released on May 20, 2008, via Barsuk Records, making it the band's second album for the label. It was produced by Peter Katis and the duo. The album debuted at number 140 on the Billboard 200 and number 10 on the Tastemakers charts in the United States.

== Critical reception ==
Professional ratings
Aggregate scores
Source	Rating
Metacritic	71/100
Review scores
Source	Rating
AllMusic	4/5 stars
Alternative Press	4/5
The A.V. Club	D+
Robert Christgau	A−
Consequence of Sound	C+
Pitchfork	5.1/10
PopMatters	5/10
Spin	4/5 stars

Re-Arrange Us was met with generally favorable reviews from music critics. At Metacritic, which assigns a normalized rating out of 100 to reviews from mainstream publications, the album received an average score of 71 based on fifteen reviews.

AllMusic's Tim Sendra praised the album, stating: "most of all it will go down like honey for Mates of State fans who have been following the band's progression from an edgy lo-fi duo to the indie rock hit making machine they have so gracefully become". Chris Parker of Alternative Press wrote: Gardner and drummer Jason Hammel discover a prettier, fuller-bodied sound and enrich it with other instruments, such as strings on the inviting opener, 'Get Better'". Spencer Kornhaber of Spin concluded: "adorned with piano and synth, the ten songs on Re-Arrange Us are fuller, more elegant vessels for the duo's warm, intricate melodies".

In mixed reviews, Adam Moerder of Pitchfork stated: "unfortunately there aren't a lot of opportunities to get caught in that lovely crossfire on Re-Arrange Us, a record that, for all its lush bells and whistles, finds the pair sounding as bare-boned and sparse as you'd expect a two-person band to be". Mike Mineo of PopMatters wrote: "despite some worthwhile moments in efforts like 'The Re-Arranger', 'My Only Offer', and the serenely infectious 'You Are Free', the biggest fault in Re-Arrange Us lies in the duo's inability this time around to capitalize upon original ideas that have been presented but not built upon".

In his negative review for The A.V. Club, Joshua Alston summed up: "the Mates recapture a bit of brio of 'The Re-Arranger' and 'Help Help', but the rest of Re-Arrange Us is only useful for putting the kids to sleep".

=== Accolades ===
Publication	List	Rank	Ref.
Paste	The 50 Best Albums of 2008	23	
The A.V. Club	The best music of 2008	18	

== Track listing ==
No.	Title	Length
1.	"Get Better"	3:27
2.	"Now"	2:39
3.	"My Only Offer"	2:58
4.	"The Re-Arranger"	4:28
5.	"Jigsaw"	3:14
6.	"Blue and Gold Print"	4:22
7.	"Help Help"	3:44
8.	"You Are Free"	3:19
9.	"Great Dane"	3:04
10.	"Lullaby Haze"	4:25
Total length:		35:40

== Charts ==
Chart (2008)	Peak position
US Billboard 200	140
US Heatseekers Albums (Billboard)	6
