= Mates of State =

American indie pop duo

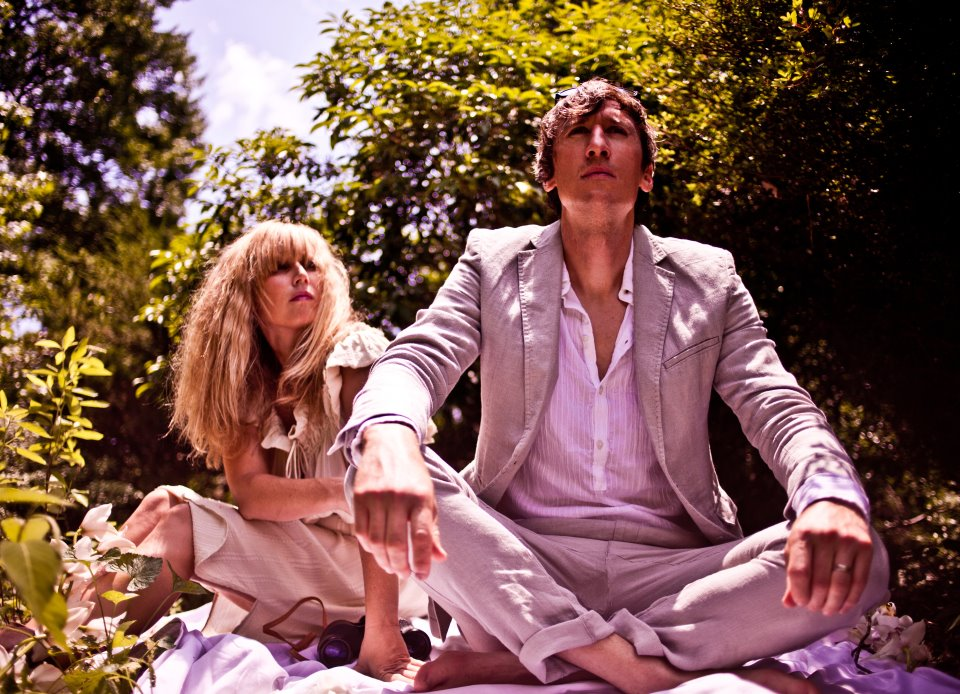
- Mates of State in 2011

Background information
- Origin: Lawrence, Kansas, U.S.
- Genre: Indie pop
- Years active: 1997–present
- Labels: Barsuk, Polyvinyl
- Members: Kori Gardner; Jason Hammel

Mates of State are an American indie pop duo, active since 1997. The group is the husband-and-wife team of Kori Gardner (born June 16, 1974) (vocals, organ, synthesizer, piano, electric piano, and occasional guitar and drums) and Jason Hammel (born February 1, 1976) (vocals, drums, percussion, and occasional synthesizer).

As of 2015, the duo has released four EPs and seven full-length albums. Their most recent album, Mountaintops, was released on September 13, 2011.

== History ==
Gardner and Hammel first met in Lawrence, Kansas, while both were involved in relationships with other people. Even though they exchanged e-mails regularly, they did not get together until three months later. They originally played together in a four-piece rock band called Vosotros, in which they both sang and played guitar. Shortly after the couple moved to California in 1998, Gardner began teaching, and Hammel applied to medical school. They both opted later to devote their time to making music and touring together instead and got married in 2001. Gardner and Hammel originally lived together in San Francisco, and in 2004 they moved to East Haven, Connecticut. In February 2007, they sold their house in East Haven and relocated to Stratford, Connecticut.

Gardner and Hammel have three daughters: Magnolia, born in 2004; June Elizabeth, born in 2008; and Phoebe Ann, born in 2017. For the band, touring became a family affair, their daughters joining them on the road. Gardner kept a 'blog, Band on the Diaper Run, that appeared on Babble.com. In its entries, she recounted their experiences of life on the road and the unique circumstance of touring with two young children in tow.

The main instruments Mates of State used in their early recordings were drums and the electric organ. Both had started out playing the guitar, but they ultimately found they were experimenting more with the organ and drums in their practice space than with any other musical instruments. On later recordings, the band moved away from the organ-dominated sound and incorporated additional instrumentation, beginning with the EP All Day and continuing on Bring It Back, their fourth studio album. The organ wasn't incorporated at all on their fifth album, Re-Arrange Us.

Mates of State songs are notable for their male/female vocal harmony, shifting rhythms, and quirky song structure – most tracks comprised distinct, almost disjointed movements. Both members tend to sing with great intensity, often in the upper ranges of their voices, and they often simultaneously sing different, complementary melodies and lyrics.

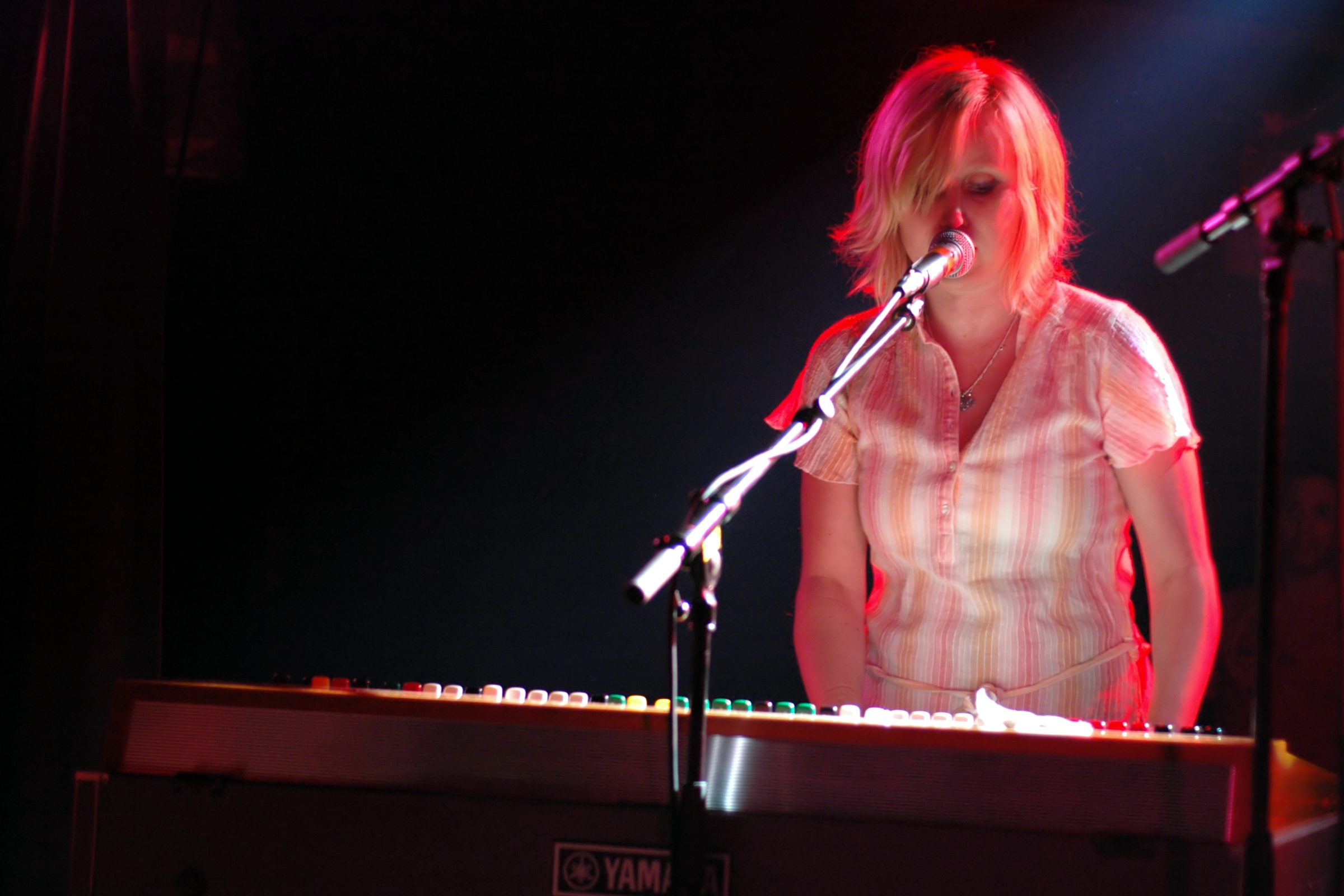
Kori Gardner, Stockholm 2005

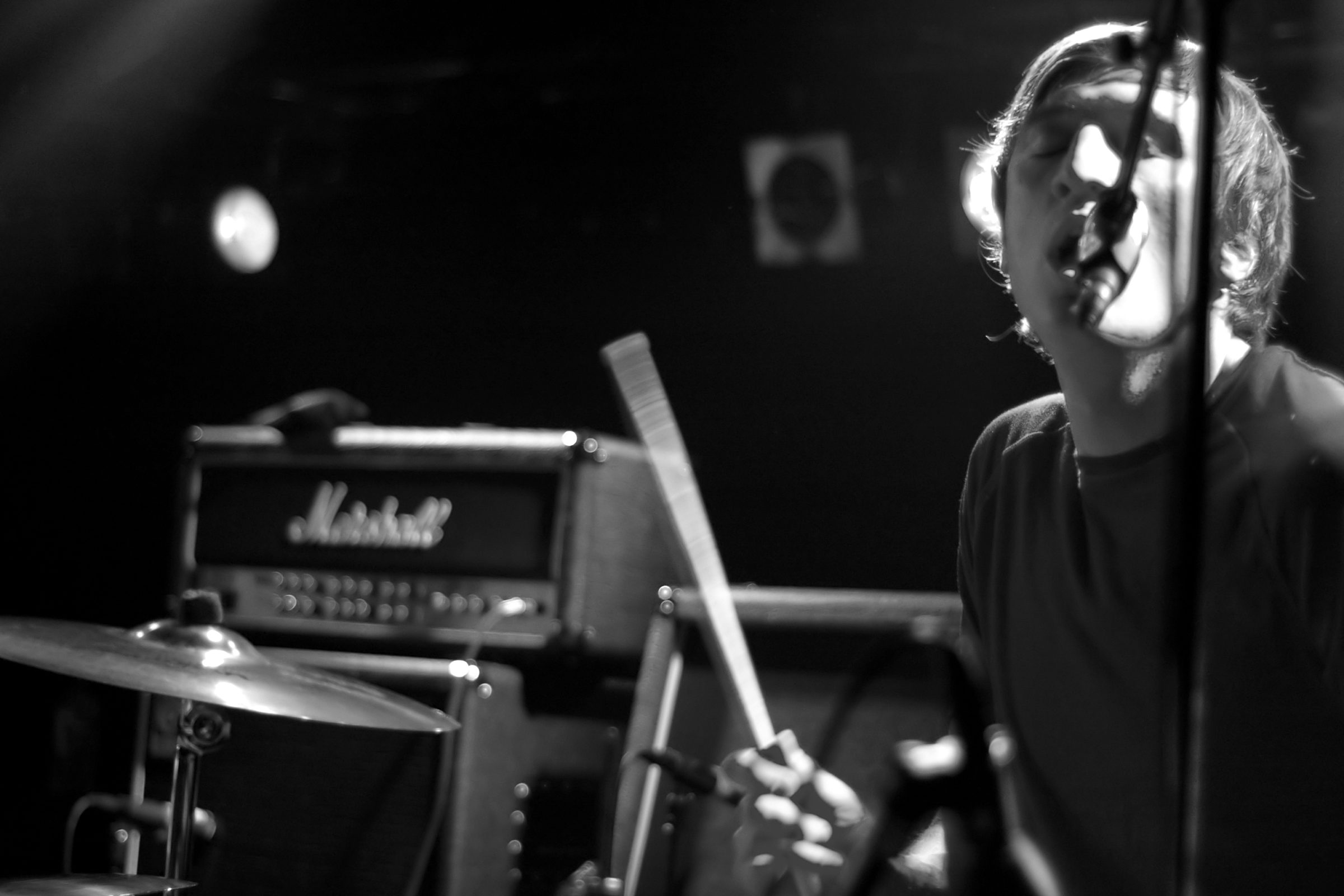
Jason Hammel, Stockholm 2005

The band recorded one album on Omnibus Records before moving to Polyvinyl for their second and third full-length albums. In December 2005, the band signed with Barsuk Records and released two full-length albums and an EP of remixes on the label.

On October 11, 2004, the band held a contest for fans to create their own video for "Goods (All In Your Head)," the first track on their All Day EP. The winning entry, directed by Jonathan Yi and Sam Goetz, became the official video for the song and was aired on MTV on June 12, 2005. It became available for download in the Media section of the band's official site.

The band's fifth album, Re-Arrange Us, was released on May 20, 2008. For their tour in support of the album, Mates of State became a quartet by adding Lewis and Anton Patzner of Judgement Day as multi-instrumentalists to complement the duo's sound on select songs.

On June 15, 2010, Mates of State released their sixth studio album, Crushes (The Covers Mixtape), which consisted entirely of their cover versions of songs previously recorded by other musical artists, including "Long Way Home" by Tom Waits and "Son Et Lumiere" by The Mars Volta. Music videos were shot for two of the songs: Nick Cave's "Love Letter" and Daniel Johnston's "True Love Will Find You in the End." The former was directed by Daniel Garcia and the latter was produced in conjunction with ABC News for its indie rock program, "Amplified."

The band's most recent full-length album, Mountaintops, was released on September 13, 2011. It also came out on Barsuk, the same independent label that released two of the band's previous records, Bring It Back and Re-Arrange Us. It consisted entirely of new original material.

== Tours and performances ==
Mates of State have performed all over the globe; in the United States, Canada, Europe, Japan, and Australia.

In the summer of 2001, they played shows with Superdrag and Beulah and, later in the year, opened for The Anniversary during the release tour for their album Your Majesty.

In 2003, Mates of State toured with Palomar.

In 2005, Mates of State toured with Jimmy Eat World and Taking Back Sunday, and performed at the Austin City Limits Music Festival in Austin, Texas.

In 2006, Mates of State toured with Spoon and Death Cab for Cutie. Mates of State also provided support (alongside Au Revoir Simone) for We Are Scientists on their tour of the UK in November 2006.

During February and March 2007, Mates of State toured as the house band for WBEZ Chicago's This American Life, hosted by Ira Glass. Tour locations included New York, Boston, Seattle, Chicago, and Minneapolis. Recordings of some of the band's performances during this tour were included in a 2008 episode titled "What I Learned from Television." On Earth Day in 2007, Mates of State headlined the Concert for a Green Earth in Westport, Connecticut.

In 2008, the team appeared again at the Austin City Limits Music Festival, in addition to performing at Lollapalooza in Chicago, the All Points West Music & Arts Festival in Jersey City, and the Pemberton Music Festival in Pemberton, BC. In 2009, they played at Diversafest in Tulsa, Oklahoma and the Voodoo Fest in New Orleans on Halloween weekend.

In 2010, they appeared on the children's television show Yo Gabba Gabba! in Rochester, New York.

Beginning in 2010, the band toured with backing musicians Kenji Shinagawa on guitar and John Panos on trumpet, both graduates of the University of Miami.

On February 16, 2012, the band began a 9-day tour of the East Coast at Union Transfer in Philadelphia, Pennsylvania.

On June 11, 2013, they joined The Postal Service's "Give Up" ten-year reunion tour at the Air Canada Theater in Toronto. The tour had stops in Boston, at the sold out Barclay's Center in Brooklyn and shows in Minnesota and Kansas City. Mates of State opened The Postal Service's last show of the tour on August 4, 2013, at the Metro in Chicago. It was also the official Lollapalooza closing party and the last time The Postal Service would tour for a decade.

They performed two songs in conjunction with BYUtv's Studio C: "Dealbreaker" in October 2013 and "Kill the Whales" in May 2014.

== Films ==
- The Rumperbutts (2015). Lead actors, producers, and composers. Starring alongside Josh Brener, Arian Moayed, and Vanessa Ray. Distributed by Mance Media.
- Two of Us (2004). Produced, directed, shot, and edited by Thadd Day. Released by Hooked on Sonics!
- The song "My Only Offer" features prominently in the last half of the trailer for the 2009 documentary Best Worst Movie and plays over that film's closing credits.

== Discography ==
=== Albums ===
Title	Album details	Peak chart positions		
Title	Album details	US	US Heat	US Indie
My Solo Project	Released: 2000; Label: Omnibus, Polyvinyl	—	—	—
Our Constant Concern	Released: January 22, 2002; Label: Polyvinyl	—	—	—
Team Boo	Released: September 16, 2003; Label: Polyvinyl	—	—	—
Bring It Back	Released: March 21, 2006; Label: Barsuk	—	32	35
Re-Arrange Us	Released: May 20, 2008; Label: Barsuk	140	6	11
Crushes (The Covers Mixtape)	Released: June 15, 2010; Label: MOS Records	—	5	34
Mountaintops	Released: September 13, 2011; Label: Barsuk	—	7	44
Greats	Released: April 6, 2015; Label: Barsuk / Fierce Panda	—	—	—
"—" denotes album that did not chart or was not released

=== EPs ===
- European Tour 2003 EP (Fickle Fame, 2003)
- All Day EP (Polyvinyl, 2004)
- Daytrotter Session (2006)
- Re-Arranged: Remixes Volume 1 (Barsuk, 2009)
- You’re Going To Make It (Barsuk, 2015)

=== Singles ===
- "Mates of State"/"Fighter D Split" (Omnibus, 1999)
- "It's the Law"/"Invitation Inn" (Omnibus, 2000)
- "Lower" (Devil in the Woods, 2001) *Note: split single with The Shins & Sparklehorse
- "Beehive State/Über Legitimate" (Snow Globe, 2001)
- "These Days" (Polyvinyl, 2002) *Note: split single with Dear Nora
- "Fraud in the '80s" (Moshi Moshi, 2006)
- "Like U Crazy" (Moshi Moshi, 2006)
- "Staring Contest" (Barsuk / Fierce Panda, 2015)

=== Other releases ===
- 2002 – "Why You Little..." on the compilation CD Ten Years of Noise Pop (Amazing Grease)
- 2005 – "Invitation Inn" on the compilation A House Full of Friends (Magic Marker)
- 2006 – "California" (Phantom Planet cover) on the compilation Music from the OC: Mix 6 (WEA)
- 2006 – "Popular Mistakes" on the compilation This is a Care Package (Exotic Fever)
- 2007 – "Jellyman Kelly" (James Taylor cover) on the compilation For The Kids III (RCA)
- 2008 – "Little Boxes" (Malvina Reynolds cover), was recorded as theme music for an episode of Weeds but never appeared on the program
- 2010 – "I Will Dare" (Replacements cover) is featured on The Onion's A.V. Club Undercover, with comedian Todd Barry on drums
- 2012 − "I am a Scientist" (Guided by Voices cover) on the compilation "Science Fair" (Spoil the Rock)
