= Can't Go Back (Fleetwood Mac song) =

Single by Fleetwood Mac

from the album Mirage
- B-side: "That's Alright"
- Released: April 1983 (UK)
- Recorded: 1982
- Genre: Pop
- Length: 2:42
- Label: Warner Bros.
- Songwriter: Lindsey Buckingham
- Producers: Lindsey Buckingham; Fleetwood Mac; Ken Caillat; Richard Dashut

Fleetwood Mac UK singles chronology
"Oh Diane" (1982)	"Can't Go Back" (1983)	"Big Love" (1987)

"Can't Go Back" is a song by British-American rock group Fleetwood Mac. It was written and performed by guitarist Lindsey Buckingham for the 1982 album Mirage, the second issued by the band with Buckingham as main producer. In the UK, it was released as the fourth single from the album.

== Background ==
Along with "Eyes of the World", "Can't Go Back" was one of the two songs that Buckingham brought into the recording studio in Hérouville, France for the Mirage sessions. The song initially began as an instrumental that was built around some interweaving guitar parts and a basic rhythm track. It was later adorned with a more extensive rhythm track from Mick Fleetwood, who overdubbed drum fills and auxiliary percussion.

The final mix of the song includes multitracked vocals that shift from the left channel to the right channel during the chorus. Blair Jackson wrote in BAM magazine that this panning effect created the impression of "two different groups independently answering the lead singer's plaintive cry." An instrumental demo of "Can't Go Back" appears on the 2016 deluxe edition of Mirage under the working title "Suma's Walk".

In the UK, the track was released as the follow-up to the Top 10 hit "Oh Diane" and became the fourth single to be released from the Mirage album in April 1983. It was released on 7" and 12", with the 12" format including "Tusk" and "Over & Over" from the 1979 album Tusk, and "Rhiannon" from 1975 album Fleetwood Mac. The song peaked at number 83 on the UK Singles Chart.

Despite being released as a single, "Can't Go Back" has yet to be included on any retrospective of Fleetwood Mac material; thus it can only be found on its parent album Mirage. In an interview with Classic Rock magazine, Christine McVie expressed her approval of "Can't Go Back" and identified the salience of the song's lyrics in relation to their attempt at recreating the success of the band's Rumours album.

== Track listings ==
UK 7" Single (W 9848)

1. "Can't Go Back" – 2:42
2. "That's Alright" - 3:09

UK 12" Single (W 9848 T)

1. "Can't Go Back" – 2:42
2. "Rhiannon" – 4:13
3. "Tusk" – 3:38
4. "Over & Over" – 4:35

== Personnel ==
- Mick Fleetwood – double tracked drums, castanets, sleigh bells, maracas
- John McVie – bass guitar
- Christine McVie – keyboards
- Lindsey Buckingham – guitars, vocals, keyboards

== Chart performance ==
Chart (1983)	Peak position
UK Singles Chart	83
