= Our Constant Concern =

Studio album by Mates of State
- Released: January 22, 2002
- Genre: Indie pop, electronica
- Length: 31:58
- Label: Polyvinyl Records

Mates of State chronology
My Solo Project (2000)	Our Constant Concern (2002)	Team Boo (2003)

Our Constant Concern is the second album by American indie pop duo Mates of State. Released on January 22, 2002, it was the first of two albums released under Polyvinyl Records.

== Critical reception ==
Professional ratings
Review scores
Source	Rating
AllMusic	4/5 stars
Pitchfork	5.0/10

Mackenzie Wilson of AllMusic called it a "stunning follow-up to 2000's My Solo Project," praising the duo's mixture of "sugary pop hooks" and "deep lyrical conversations" through "young but charming" harmonies, concluding "[T]heir relationship is their musical storybook and Our Constant Concern playfully suggests that love can really be beautiful." Pitchfork writer Rob Mitchum was disappointed with the album, noting the slow tempo of the material, heavy use of non-distorted organ effects, and the duo's harmonies being "far less eccentric and less vibrant" compared to their first effort. Despite giving praise to "Quit Doin' It" and "Halves and Have-Nots", he wrote "these brief flashes, even on a thirty-minute album, do little to keep the dreaded sophomore slump virus from hitting Our Constant Concern."

== Track listing ==
No.	Title	Length
1.	"Hoarding It for Home"	4:15
2.	"10 Years Later"	3:08
3.	"Über Legitimate"	3:55
4.	"Girls Singing"	3:05
5.	"I Know, and I Said Forget It"	3:41
6.	"Quit Doin' It"	3:47
7.	"A Duel Will Settle This"	3:42
8.	"Clean Out"	2:10
9.	"Halves and Have-Nots"	1:57
10.	"As Night as Now"	2:18

== In popular culture ==
The Mates of State song "Girls Singing" from the Our Constant Concern album was prominently featured in "Changes: You Got A Prom Wit Dat?" the first season (originally series) finale of the MTV animated series Clone High, which premiered on Teletoon on March 2, 2003.
