= Love in Store =

Single by Fleetwood Mac

from the album Mirage
- B-side: "Can't Go Back"
- Released: 3 November 1982
- Recorded: 1982
- Length: 3:14
- Label: Warner Bros. 7-29848
- Songwriters: Christine McVie; Jim Recor
- Producers: Lindsey Buckingham; Fleetwood Mac; Ken Caillat; Richard Dashut

Fleetwood Mac US singles chronology
| "Gypsy" (1982) | "Love in Store" (1982) | "Oh Diane" (1982) |

"Love in Store" is a song by British-American rock group Fleetwood Mac. The song serves as the opening track to their thirteenth studio album Mirage (1982). "Love in Store" was written by Christine McVie and Jim Recor, and features McVie on lead vocals, with vocal harmonies by Stevie Nicks and background vocals by Lindsey Buckingham. The song was released on 3 November 1982 via Warner Bros as the third single from Mirage, exclusively in North America, Australasia, and the Netherlands.

It proved a moderate-sized hit, charting at number 22 on the Billboard Hot 100 and number 11 on the Adult Contemporary chart.

== Release and later appearances ==
Released in November 1982, the song debuted at number 72 on the US Billboard Hot 100 on the week dated 27 November 1982. That same week, it was the second most added song by national radio stations and listed by Billboard as a national breakout due to its significant radio activity. On the week dated 11 December 1982, the song entered the top forty and later went on to peak at No. 22 for three weeks as the follow-up to top 20 hits "Hold Me" (No. 4) and "Gypsy" (No. 12). "Love in Store" spent a total of 14 weeks in the top 100, eight of which were in the top 40. It also peaked at number 11 on the Adult Contemporary chart.

In the UK, another track from Mirage, "Oh Diane", was released as the third single and became a top ten hit. "Love In Store" was not released as a single in the UK, although it was released in other territories such as Australia.

An alternate mix of the song was released in 1992 on the CD box set 25 Years – The Chain. An early mix was included on the 2016 deluxe edition of Mirage. This version featured a different bassline and vocal arrangement along with more prominent mallet percussion. Buckingham and Christine McVie mentioned that components from the original basic track were retained for the final mix and said that they adjusted parts for "Love in Store" "constantly" throughout the recording sessions for Mirage. "Love in Store" was included on the 2002 US version and 2009 UK re-issue of The Very Best of Fleetwood Mac. Fleetwood Mac performed the song on their 1982 Mirage Tour; a recording from their performance at The Forum appeared on their Mirage Tour '82 live album in 2024.

== Critical reception ==
Billboard said that "Love in Store" "has the same appeal as the string of singles that first gave the group ownership of the pop charts in 1975–1976." Rolling Stone thought that the vocals on "Love in Store", which they described as a "pulsing" song, created the impression of a "feather bed".

== Personnel ==
- Christine McVie – electric piano, electronic organ, lead vocals, backing vocals
- Lindsey Buckingham – electric guitar, acoustic guitar, backing vocals
- Stevie Nicks – backing vocals
- John McVie – bass guitar
- Mick Fleetwood – drums, tambourine, güiro, wood block, xylophone

== Charts ==
=== Weekly charts ===
| Chart (1982–1983) | Peak position |
|---|---|
| Australia (Kent Music Report) | 96 |
| US Billboard Hot 100 | 22 |
| US Adult Contemporary (Billboard) | 11 |
| US Cash Box Top 100 | 28 |
| US Adult Contemporary (Radio & Records) | 6 |
| US Contemporary Hit Radio (Radio & Records) | 9 |

=== Year-end charts ===
| Chart (1983) | Position |
|---|---|
| US Adult Contemporary (Radio & Records) | 68 |
