= Mountaintops (album) =

Studio album by Mates of State
- Released: September 13, 2011
- Studios: Studio 1973 (Brooklyn); Tarquin Studios (Bridgeport)
- Genre: Indie pop
- Length: 37:23
- Label: Barsuk
- Producer: Mates of State

Mates of State chronology
Crushes (The Covers Mixtape) (2010)	Mountaintops (2011)	Greats (2015)

Mountaintops is the seventh album by American indie pop band Mates of State. It was released through Barsuk on September 13, 2011. The song "Palomino" was featured in a 15-second Ice Breakers commercial where a man and a woman share a cab in a rainy night.

== Reception ==
Professional ratings
Aggregate scores
Source	Rating
Metacritic	74/100
Review scores
Source	Rating
The A.V. Club	B+
AllMusic	4/5 stars
Consequence of Sound	C+
Paste	8.1/10
Pitchfork	7.1/10
PopMatters	5/10
Robert Christgau	A−
Spin	7/10 stars
Sputnikmusic	3.0/5.0

Mountaintops received generally favorable reviews from music critics. At Metacritic, which assigns a normalized rating out of 100 to reviews from mainstream critics, the album received an average score of 74, based on 18 reviews.

Robert Christgau gave it an A− and wrote that "the wholeness of the music leaves us feeling they're more than OK." Spin gave the album a 7/10, writing, "Mountaintops has plenty of upbeat romps, but the most compelling moments are the epic, minor-key laments 'At Least I Have You' and 'Unless I'm Led,' which argue that even the truest of loves can still feel lonely and miserable."

Paste placed Mountaintops at number 49 on their "Top 50 Albums of 2011" list. The magazine's writer Carey Hodges said: "On Mountaintops, the band's seventh full-length, the pair delivers more of their polished pop while tastefully showcasing a handful of warped turns that partner lush synths with minor-key experiments."

== Track listing ==
All tracks are written by Mates of State.

No.	Title	Length
1.	"Palomino"	4:54
2.	"Maracas"	3:22
3.	"Sway"	3:34
4.	"Unless I'm Led"	5:21
5.	"Total Serendipity"	3:40
6.	"Basement Money"	3:32
7.	"At Least I Have You"	3:34
8.	"Desire"	2:47
9.	"Change"	2:38
10.	"Mistakes"	4:01

== Personnel ==
Credits adapted from the album's liner notes.

Mates of State

- Jason Hammel
- Kori Gardner

Additional musicians

- John Panos – horns (5, 8, 10)
- Kenji Shinagawa – guitars (5, 7, 8)
- Ryan Breen – guitar (1)

Technical

- Chris Coady – mixing (Soundtracks)
- Steve Fallone – mastering (Sterling Sound)

Imagery

- Jeremy Paul Beasley – artwork, packaging
