= Eyes of the World (Fleetwood Mac song) =

Song by Fleetwood Mac

from the album Mirage
- A-side: Hold Me
- Released: 1982
- Recorded: 1981 – 1982
- Studio: Le Château (Hérouville, France); Larrabee Sound (Los Angeles, California)
- Length: 3:44
- Label: Warner Bros.
- Songwriter: Lindsey Buckingham
- Producers: Fleetwood Mac, Richard Dashut, Ken Caillat

"Eyes of the World" is a song written by Lindsey Buckingham. It was included on Fleetwood Mac's thirteenth studio album, Mirage, in 1982. The song appeared as the B-side to "Hold Me", which served as Mirage's lead single. Following its inclusion on Mirage, the band has played the song live on numerous tours.

Musically, "Eyes of the World" incorporates the chord progression of Pachelbel's Canon and features several overdubs of guitars and backing vocals. The band heavily reworked the song throughout the recording sessions for Mirage and spliced together multiple unique sections to construct the final product.

== Composition ==
"Eyes of the World" emerged from components of Buckingham's song "Bwana" from his 1981 solo album, Law and Order. Buckingham used the drum track from an earlier arrangement of "Bwana" as the basis of "Eyes of the World" and explained that it was common for him to repurpose his existing material into new songs. According to Mick Fleetwood, "Eyes of the World" was one of two songs that Buckingham brought to the Mirage recording sessions at Le Château along with "Can't Go Back". Christine McVie said that "Eyes of the World" underwent significant changes in the recording studio; she believed that the final product was "hardly recognizable" from when it was first introduced to the band.

That started off with fewer sections [than it] ended up with. It's like a succession of little sections, sort of like Brian Wilson or classical-meets-Eddie Cochran. It starts off with the 'swingles,' then it goes into a sort of Bach-esque guitar thing and they're all fairly succinct sections within themselves, all butted up against each other

— Lindsey Buckingham

"Eyes of the World" initially consisted of a three chord cycle, which was played at a slower tempo than the final version that appeared on Mirage. Early run-throughs of the song lacked any lyrics and were instead temporarily supplanted with vocalizations from both Nicks and Buckingham as placeholders. Aspects of an early take were later used on Nicks' song "Enchanted", which she released on her 1983 album The Wild Heart.

== Recording ==
Buckingham structured "Eyes of the World" by splicing together different musical passages, including one that he called "the Swingle Singers section". He placed this section at the beginning of the composition and reintroduced the motif around midway through. Buckingham also incorporated an interpolation of an instrumental composition from his 1973 Buckingham Nicks album titled "Stephanie". Buckingham stated in an interview with Guitar World that he had no qualms repurposing some of his older compositions and that it gave him the opportunity to place his songs in a different context. He likened this technique to "leaving little clues for listeners who are really paying attention."

"Eyes of the World" continued to receive work throughout the Mirage sessions. Christine McVie and Buckingham recorded some wordless multitracked whispered vocals to the song's intro. High Fidelity magazine described the song as having a "fragmentary lyric style". These vocals are set to chord progression of Pachelbel's Canon, which Buckingham transposed to the key of B flat major. The lyrics, which touch upon themes of paranoia, are also juxtaposed with an interpolation of the 19th century nursery rhyme "Monday's Child". Buckingham changed the words from "Monday's child is fair of face/Tuesdays's child is full grace" to "Monday's children are filled with face/Tuesday's children are filled with grace."

Buckingham overdubbed multiple guitars on "Eyes of the World", including a Gibson Les Paul and a Fender Stratocaster, many of which were recorded in December 1981 and January 1982. He used a variable speed oscillator (VSO) to make some of the guitars resemble a twelve string, which he achieved by recording his parts at half-speed and then speeding up the track using the VSO, resulting in a phasing effect with the guitars. The song was recorded at 15 inches per second on a Studer 24-track machine. Multi-layered vocals were later added to the intro along with a fuzz guitar solo during the outro.

== Critical reception ==
Some contemporary and retrospective reviews of "Eyes of the World" compared the song to some of Buckingham's work on Tusk. John Milward of Rolling Stone thought that the song's lyrics were marginally better than the "limp language" found on "Book of Love". He also highlighted the song's "riveting guitar solo" and "'Tusk'-like beat". In his review of Mirage, Ken Emerson of The Boston Phoenix highlighted the song's "nursery rhymes and Swingle Sisters harmonies".

Writing for BAM, Blair Jackson highlighted the song's "stunningly beautiful interplay of overdubbed acoustic guitars" and thought that the backing vocals in the intro resembled "the Swingle Singers updating Bach." Newsweek noticed the influence of the Swingle Singers in the backing vocals and called the song an "oddball". Writing for The Washington Post, Geoffrey Himes believed that "Eyes of the World" was a song that exemplified his "odd brand of folkie-surf music." Sandy Robertson of Sounds identified the song as a "frantically compelling flare-up" with "idiosyncratic" guitar work.

Annie Zaleski of The A.V. Club characterised "Eyes of the World" as a "skeletal" and "acoustic-driven" song that was "plenty abstract". Ben Allan of GQ placed "Eyes of the World" on his list of the ten best Fleetwood Mac songs post-Rumours, saying that the song's "chaotic energy" channeled the work of Tusk despite being more "radio-friendly" than some of the tracks present on that album. Michael Gallucci Ultimate Classic Rock was more lukewarm and believed that it would have been more fitting on a Buckingham solo album. Mike Mettler of Sound & Vision called the song "a textbook case of capturing someone just a tick away from being fully unhinged," and said that it was "the main callback to his Tusk proclivities," citing the oddly enticing wide percussive field [and] the acoustic/electric chordal juxtaposition".

== Live performances ==
"Eyes of the World" debuted during the Mirage Tour in 1982. These renditions included prominent vocal harmonisations from Buckingham and Christine McVie. A live recording from one of Fleetwood Mac's October 1982 performances at The Forum in Inglewood, California was later included on disc three of the 2016 deluxe edition of Mirage and the 2024 release of Mirage Tour 82. Buckingham eschewed concert tours until 1992, when he played "Eyes of the World" as an encore for his 1992–1993 solo tour promoting his Out of the Cradle album. He was accompanied onstage with four other guitarists, three percussionists, a bassist, and a keyboardist for these performances.

Fleetwood Mac played "Eyes of the World" on their opening night of The Dance tour in Hartford, Connecticut on 17 September 1997, but substituted this song for "Second Hand News" on all subsequent dates of the tour. "Eyes of the World" also appeared on all legs of the Say You Will Tour with the exception of the 2004 North American leg, where it was replaced with "I Know I'm Not Wrong". A live recording of the song taken from a performance at the Boston FleetCenter was included on both the CD and DVD editions of Fleetwood Mac: Live in Boston, which was released in 2004.

Fleetwood Mac revived the song for their 2013 concert tour. It was the only song in the setlist other than "Gypsy" that originated from the Mirage album. Fleetwood would open "Eyes of the World" with a drum solo that led into the main song. Several publications, including The Boston Globe, Cleveland Scene, and The Newtown Bee praised Fleetwood's drumming on this song, with Zaleski characterising his playing as "monstrous" in her concert review of Fleetwood Mac's performance at the Rocket Mortgage FieldHouse. During these performances, visuals of zoomed-in eyeballs were projected onto a video screen behind the band.

== Personnel ==
- Lindsey Buckingham – electric and acoustic guitars, lead and backing vocals
- Mick Fleetwood – drums
- John McVie – bass guitar
- Christine McVie – backing vocals
