= Crushes (The Covers Mixtape) =

Mixtape by Mates of State
- Released: June 15, 2010
- Genre: Indie pop
- Length: 30:47
- Label: MOS Records / Constant Artists, Inc. / TuneCore
- Producer: Kori Gardner, Jason Hammel

Mates of State chronology
Re-Arrange Us (2008)	Crushes (The Covers Mixtape) (2010)	Mountaintops (2011)

Professional ratings
Review scores
Source	Rating
Alternative Press	3.5/5 stars
The A.V. Club	C+
Under the Radar	7/10 stars

Crushes (The Covers Mixtape) is the sixth full-length release by husband/wife duo Mates of State. It was released digitally via iTunes as well as from the band's website on June 15, 2010. On the band's website, they explained the reason for doing a covers album. "We've been talking about doing a covers record for a long time. We'd hear a great song at 2 AM while driving the straight line from one part of Texas to the next, and all we'd want to do is play that song as if we had written it." The album was recorded and produced by Kori Gardner and Jason Hammel, making it their first self-produced record to date. The album was mixed by Peter Katis (The National, Interpol, Frightened Rabbit, Jónsi), a longtime collaborator. The third track "Sleep the Clock Around" was featured in the film The Art of Getting By.

== Track listing ==
No.	Title	Original artist	Length
1.	"Laura"	Girls	3:50
2.	"Son Et Lumiere"	The Mars Volta	2:09
3.	"Sleep the Clock Around"	Belle & Sebastian	5:12
4.	"Technicolor Girls"	Death Cab for Cutie	2:29
5.	"Long Way Home"	Tom Waits	3:31
6.	"Love Letter"	Nick Cave and the Bad Seeds	3:42
7.	"Second Hand News"	Fleetwood Mac	3:13
8.	"17 Pink Sugar Elephants"	Vashti Bunyan	2:01
9.	"Roller Coaster Ride"	Dear Nora	2:04
10.	"True Love Will Find You in the End"	Daniel Johnston	2:36
