= Arian Moayed =

Iranian actor (born 1980)

- Moayed in 2026
- Born: April 15, 1980 (age 46); Tehran, Iran
- Education: Glenbrook South High School
- Alma mater: Indiana University (BA)
- Occupations: Actor; screenwriter; director
- Years active: 2002–present
- Spouse: Krissy Shields
- Children: 2

Arian Moayed (Persian: آرین مؤید; born April 15, 1980) is an Iranian-American actor, screenwriter, and director. Moayed received two Tony Award nominations for Best Featured Actor in a Play for his performances as an Iraqi gardener in Bengal Tiger at the Baghdad Zoo (2011) and a domineering husband in A Doll's House (2023), and two Primetime Emmy Award nominations for his role as private equity investor Stewy Hosseini in HBO's Succession.

Moayed portrayed Todd Spodek in Netflix's Inventing Anna and Agent P. Cleary in the Marvel Cinematic Universe film Spider-Man: No Way Home (2021) and the Disney+ series Ms. Marvel (2022) and Wonder Man (2026).

== Early life ==
Arian Moayed was born in Tehran, Iran. His father is a banker by profession. His parents emigrated from Iran in 1986. The family settled in Glenview, in Cook County, Illinois, a suburb of Chicago, when Moayed was five years old. Moayed has described his family as Persian-speaking Muslims.

Moayed graduated from Glenbrook South High School in 1998. He then received a bachelor's degree from Indiana University Bloomington in 2002. During college, he appeared in plays by Samuel Beckett, Carlo Goldoni and William Shakespeare.

== Career ==
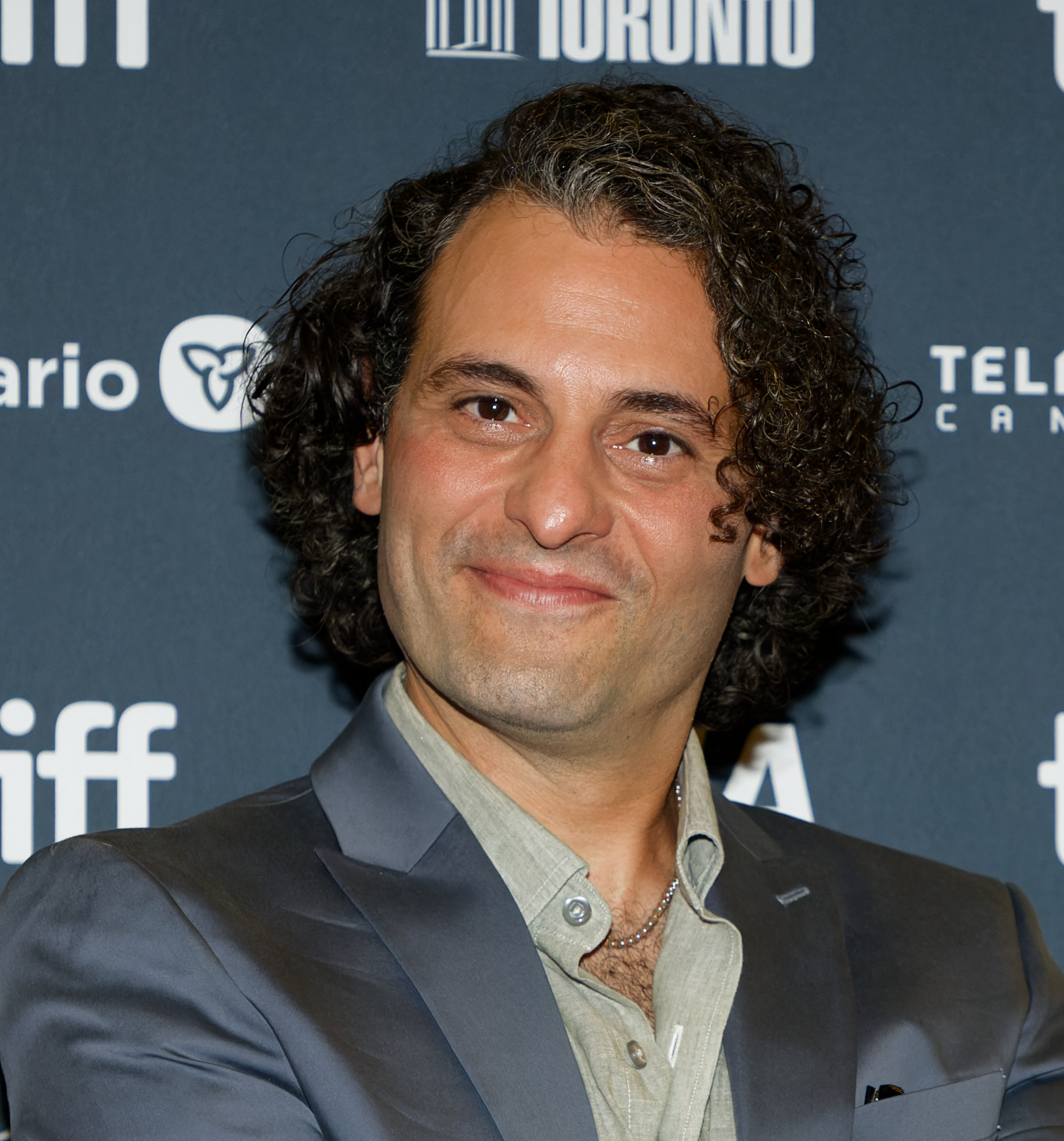
Moayed at the 2024 Toronto International Film Festival for Shell

Moayed moved to Manhattan after college. In 2002, Moayed and director Tom Ridgely, who was Moayed's roommate at Indiana University, co-founded the Waterwell, a theater, education and film company based out of New York. Waterwell has produced more than a dozen stage productions and shows since the theater was established.

He portrayed the character of Musa in Rajiv Joseph's Bengal Tiger at the Baghdad Zoo, where Moayed appeared opposite Robin Williams. Moayed received a Tony Award nomination for Best Featured Actor in a Play for his portrayal of Musa at the 65th Tony Awards in 2011. He also received a Drama League Award nomination for Distinguished Performance and received a Theater World Award.

As a writer/director, Moayed wrote and directed his first short Overdue, which premiered at the Cinequest Film Festival and was released on The Business of Being Born website. His second film, Day Ten, stars Omar Metwally and is about the days after September 11, 2001, premiering at the Tribeca Film Festival.

In 2016, he starred as Babur, one of two characters in Guards at the Taj, a play written by Rajiv Joseph, alongside Omar Metwally as Humayun. For his performance, he received a 2016 Obie Award presented by the American Theatre Wing and The Village Voice.

In 2017, Moayed starred as Richard Saad in Stephen Karam's The Humans, which performed at the Roundabout Theater off-Broadway, Helen Hayes Theater and Gerald Schoenfeld Theater on Broadway as well as the Hampstead Theater in London. The production, directed by Joe Mantello and produced by Scott Rudin, won a Tony Award for Best Play at the 70th Tony Awards, and garnered Moayed a Drama Desk Award for Outstanding Ensemble.

From 2018 to 2023, Moayed starred as Stewy Hosseini in HBO's Succession, for which he received nominations for a Primetime Emmy Award for Outstanding Guest Actor in a Drama Series in 2022 and 2023.

=== Waterwell ===
Waterwell focuses on socially conscious and civic minded approach to theater, education, and film. Waterwell mission states, "empower its audience to change their lives and the world in which they live."

As the co-founder of Waterwell, Moayed has helped devise over a dozen original productions including most recently a dual-language Hamlet (played the title role) to critical acclaim. Also with Waterwell, Moayed produced a forgotten war musical called Blueprint Specials, produced on board of the Intrepid with a cast of veterans.

With Waterwell Films, he has written and directed the Emmy nominated and Webby nominated The Accidental Wolf, a premium short form series starring Kelli O'Hara, Laurie Metcalf, Denis O'Hare, Brandon Dirden, Ben McKenzie, Judith Ivey, Reed Birney, Marsha Stephanie Blake and a cast of over 70 Tony nominees on its own platform, theaccidentalwolf.com.

== Personal life ==
Moayed lives in New York City with his wife, Krissy Shields, and two daughters.

In October 2023, Moayed signed the Artists4Ceasefire open letter to Joe Biden, President of the United States, calling for a ceasefire of the Israeli bombardment of Gaza in response to the October 7 attacks. In September 2025, he signed an open pledge with Film Workers for Palestine pledging not to work with Israeli film institutions "that are implicated in genocide and apartheid against the Palestinian people".

== Acting credits ==
=== Film ===
Year	Title	Role	Notes
2003	Phileine Says Sorry	Taxichauffeur 2	
2007	Arranged	Ahmed Khaldi	
2008	The Christians	Darmon	
2011	Roadie	Irfan	
2014	Appropriate Behavior	Ali	
2014	Rosewater	Hamid	
2014	Saint Janet	Dr. Apte	
2015	The Rumperbutts	Gavin	
2015	Rock the Kasbah	Riza	
2019	Abe	Amir	
2021	Spider-Man: No Way Home	Agent P. Cleary	
2023	You Hurt My Feelings	Mark	
2023	Retribution	Sylvain	
2024	Shell	Dr. Hubert	
2024	House of Spoils	Andres	
2025	Fountain of Youth	Inspector Jamal Abbas	
2026	Other Mommy	Uncle Frank	

=== Television ===
Year	Title	Role	Notes
2003–2004	Late Night with Conan O'Brien	Various	3 episodes
2004–2010	Law & Order: Criminal Intent	Samil Al-Bana / Eli Gold	2 episodes
2005	Law & Order	Fadi Abu Ubdeh	Episode: "Bible Story"
2006	Six Degrees	Jay	Episode: "A New Light"
2007	Law & Order: Special Victims Unit	Amal Qinawi	Episode: "Philadelphia"
2007	M.O.N.Y.	Ates Kiliclioglu	NBC pilot
2009	White Collar	Avet	Episode: "Threads"
2013	The Following	David	2 episodes
2014	Believe	Corey	7 episodes
2014	Black Box	Cyrus	Episode: "The Fear"
2015	The Blacklist	Burke	Episode: "Ruslan Denisov (No. 67)"
2015	Elementary	Yusuf Al Shamsi	Episode: "Absconded"
2017	Mr. Mercedes	Augie	Episode: "Pilot"
2017–2019	Madam Secretary	Mohammed "Mo" Alwash	11 episodes
2018–2023	Succession	Stewy Hosseini	Main role; 25 episodes
2021	Love Life	Kian Parsa	6 episodes
2022	Inventing Anna	Todd Spodek	9 episodes
2022	Ms. Marvel	Agent P. Cleary	3 episodes
2024	Elsbeth	Joe	Episode: "Sweet Justice"
2025	Nobody Wants This	Dr. Andy	Recurring role; 6 episodes
2025	Elsbeth	Joe	Episode: "Ramen Holiday"
2026	Wonder Man	Agent P. Cleary	6 episodes
TBA	The Off Weeks	Angelo	Upcoming miniseries
TBA	The People v. Gorilla Grodd	TBA	Filming

=== Theatre ===
Year	Title	Role	Venue
2005	The Persians	Xerxes	Perry Street Theatre, Off-Broadway
2006	The American Pilot	The Translator/The Trader/Soldier (u/s)	New York City Center/Stage II, Off-Broadway
2007	The Last Year in the Life of The Rev. Dr. Martin Luther King, Jr., as Devised by Waterwell: A Rock Operetta	Performer	Barrow Street Theatre, Off-Broadway
2007	Queens Boulevard (the musical)	Abdi	Peter Norton Space, Off-Broadway
2008	Masked	Na'im	DR2 Theater, Off-Broadway
2009	Mahida's Extra Key to Heaven	Ramin	Peter Norton Space, Off-Broadway
2011	King Lear	Edgar	The Public Theater, Off-Broadway
2011	Bengal Tiger at the Baghdad Zoo	Musa	Richard Rodgers Theatre, Broadway
2012	Food and Fadwa	Emir Azzam	New York Theatre Workshop, Off-Broadway
2015	Guards at the Taj	Babur	Linda Gross Theater, Off-Broadway
2015	The Humans	Richard Saad	Laura Pels Theater, Off-Broadway
2016	The Humans	Richard Saad	Gerald Schoenfeld Theatre, Broadway
2017	Hamlet	Hamlet	Loreto Theater, Off-Broadway
2023	A Doll's House	Torvald Helmer	Hudson Theatre, Broadway
2023	Gutenberg! The Musical!	Producer	James Earl Jones Theatre, Broadway

=== Video games ===
- Pony Island 2: Panda Circus (2027)

== Awards and nominations ==
Name of the award ceremony, year presented, category, nominee of the award, and the result of the nomination
Award	Year	Category	Nominated work	Result	Ref.
Drama Desk Awards	2008	Outstanding Featured Actor in a Play	Masked	Nominated	
Drama Desk Awards	2016	Outstanding Ensemble Performance	The Humans	Won	
Drama Desk Awards	2023	Outstanding Featured Performance in a Play	A Doll's House	Nominated	
Drama League Award	2023	Distinguished Performance	A Doll's House	Nominated	
Hollywood Critics Association Awards	2023	Best Guest Actor in a Drama Series	Succession	Nominated	
Online Film & Television Association Awards	2022	Best Guest Actor in a Drama Series	Succession	Nominated	
Primetime Emmy Awards	2022	Outstanding Guest Actor in a Drama Series	Succession	Nominated	
Primetime Emmy Awards	2023	Outstanding Guest Actor in a Drama Series	Succession	Nominated	
Screen Actors Guild Awards	2024	Outstanding Ensemble in a Drama Series	Succession	Won	
Tony Awards	2011	Best Featured Actor in a Play	Bengal Tiger at the Baghdad Zoo	Nominated	
Tony Awards	2023	Best Featured Actor in a Play	A Doll's House	Nominated	
