= Bring It Back (Mates of State album) =

Studio album by Mates of State
- Released: March 21, 2006
- Genre: Indie pop
- Length: 41:40
- Label: Barsuk
- Producer: Bill Racine

Mates of State chronology
Team Boo (2003)	Bring It Back (2006)	Re-Arrange Us (2008)

Bring It Back is the fourth album by American indie pop band Mates of State. Released March 21, 2006, on Barsuk Records, the band's fourth album was their first to register on the Billboard charts, reaching number 35 on the Independent Albums chart and number 32 on the Top Heatseekers chart. The first track "Think Long", references the Modest Mouse song of the same name.

The song "For the Actor" from the album has been used on commercials for both AT&T wireless phones and for the Royal Caribbean cruise line.

== Critical reception ==
Professional ratings
Review scores
Source	Rating
AllMusic	4.5/5 stars
The A.V. Club	B+
Entertainment Weekly	B
Pitchfork	7.8/10
Rolling Stone	3/5 stars

Bring It Back received positive reviews from music critics. Tim Sendra of AllMusic gave high praise to the duo's evolving musicianship for having additional instruments into their established blueprints and crafting tracks that are both catchy and contain deep intricacies, concluding that "Mates of State started off their career as a kind of curiosity (no guitars!) but have grown into the kind of group where you can't wait to see what they will do next, even if it is only to release records like Bring It Back that strengthen and perfect their formula." Noel Murray of The A.V. Club also praised the musical chemistry of Gardner and Hammel's talents for creating songs that transcend the given genre and allow for certain elements to showcase their depth, concluding that "Bring It Back isn't exactly a set of love songs, but a song like the punchy "Punchlines," with its shifting tempos and call-and-response verses, definitely celebrates the sound of two voices working alone, and working as one." Sam Ubl of Pitchfork praised the duo's songs for containing various combinations of instrumentations, lyrics, genres and vocal tones that showcase their fullest musical capabilities, saying that the "Organ-and-drums duo gingerly lift the moratorium on six-strings and explore a more varied sonic palette, resulting in their best album to date." Christian Hoard of Rolling Stone praised the duo's vocal work over various types of love songs, saying that "Plucky, precious and sometimes cloying, their fourth album unfolds like a fussed-over valentine."

== Track listing ==
No.	Title	Length
1.	"Think Long"	4:43
2.	"Fraud in the '80s"	4:22
3.	"Like U Crazy"	3:57
4.	"Beautiful Dreamer"	4:39
5.	"What It Means"	2:25
6.	"For the Actor"	4:33
7.	"Nature and the Wreck"	2:22
8.	"So Many Ways"	3:57
9.	"Punchlines"	3:53
10.	"Running Out"	6:49

== Charts ==
Chart (2006)	Peak position
US Heatseekers Albums (Billboard)	32
US Independent Albums (Billboard)	35
