= Only Over You =

Song by Fleetwood Mac

from the album Mirage
- Released: June 18, 1982
- Length: 4:08
- Label: Warner Bros.
- Songwriter: Christine McVie
- Producers: Fleetwood Mac, Richard Dashut, Ken Caillat

Licensed audio
- "Only Over You" on YouTube

"Only Over You" is a song by the British-American rock band Fleetwood Mac from their 1982 album Mirage. It was written by Christine McVie for her boyfriend at the time, the Beach Boys' drummer Dennis Wilson. The record sleeve states, "With thanks to Dennis Wilson for inspiration." Biographer Jon Stebbins characterized the song as McVie's "last declaration of love" toward Wilson.

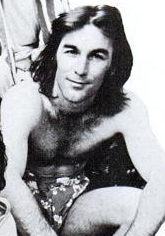
McVie wrote the song as a message to her then-boyfriend, Dennis Wilson (pictured 1971).

== Release and reception ==
McVie began sketching out "Only Over You" in 1980 while Fleetwood Mac was on their Tusk Tour. At this point, the song consisted of piano and a rough vocal melody. The following year, an early unreleased version "Only Over You", taken from the band's sessions at Château d'Hérouville, was selected by Rolling Stone to play in the background during Annie Leibovitz's photo shoot with Stevie Nicks for a appearance on the 3 September 1981 cover of their magazine.

"Only Over You" appeared as the sixth track on their 1982 album Mirage. In the UK, the song was issued as the B-side to their single "Oh Diane". An alternate mix of "Only Over You" was included on the 2016 deluxe reissue of Mirage. This version features louder drums and unused guitar parts from Buckingham.

Both contemporary and retrospective views of the song have been favourable. Sandy Robertson of Sounds labelled "Only Over You" as one of the two best songs on Mirage along with "Hold Me". Writing for Rolling Stone, John Milward highlighted McVie's vocal delivery on the song's opening line, "I'm out of my mind", and drew a lyrical parallel to "Over My Head".

Annie Zaleski of The A.V. Club characterised "Only Over You" as "an old-fashioned torch song". Mike Mettler of Sound & Vision called the song "subtly insistent" and highlighted the "'emergency' keyboard notes back in the mix". The Guardian and Paste ranked the song number 26 and number 24 respectively on their lists of the 30 greatest Fleetwood Mac songs.

== Influence ==
In 2009, musician Daniel Lopatin (credited as "sunsetcorp") reworked "Only Over You" as a hypnagogic pop music video titled "angel". The lyrics "Angel please don't go, I miss you when you go" were slowed down and looped with a phaser effect applied to certain phrases. A year later in 2010, he would release the track as "Untitled A2" under the pseudonym "Chuck Person" of Chuck Person's Eccojams Vol. 1.
