= My Solo Project =

Studio album by Mates of State
- Released: 2000
- Recorded: 1999–2000
- Genre: Indie pop
- Label: Omnibus

Mates of State chronology
My Solo Project (2000)	Our Constant Concern (2002)

My Solo Project is the debut album by the American musical duo Mates of State, released in 2000.

== Critical reception ==
Professional ratings
Review scores
Source	Rating
AllMusic	4/5 stars
Pitchfork	7.6/10
Tiny Mix Tapes	4.5/5 stars

The New York Times wrote that "Mates of State use keyboards and drums to create indie pop songs that ooze with a love that is, like the music, fragile and imperfect but all the more powerful because of it."

== Track listing ==
1. "Names" - 0:51
2. "Proofs" - 2:17
3. "What I Could Stand For" - 3:22
4. "La'hov" - 3:46
5. "Nice Things That Look Good" - 4:27
6. "A Control Group" - 3:00
7. "Throw Down" - 2:32
8. "I Have Space" - 2:26
9. "Everyone Needs an Editor" - 2:54
10. "Tan/Black" - 3:57
11. "Ride Again" - 3:40
12. "More in Me" - 0:39
