= Gypsy (Fleetwood Mac song) =

1982 single by Fleetwood Mac

Single by Fleetwood Mac

from the album Mirage
- B-side: "Cool Water"
- Released: 18 August 1982 (US); 17 September 1982 (UK)
- Genre: Soft rock
- Length: 4:24 (album version); 3:53 (single edit); 5:21 ("full-length version" featured on 25 Years - The Chain)
- Label: Warner Bros.
- Songwriter: Stevie Nicks
- Producers: Lindsey Buckingham; Fleetwood Mac; Ken Caillat; Richard Dashut

Fleetwood Mac UK singles chronology
| "Hold Me" (1982) | "Gypsy" (1982) | "Oh Diane" (1982) |

Fleetwood Mac US singles chronology
| "Hold Me" (1982) | "Gypsy" (1982) | "Love in Store" (1982) |

Music video
- "Gypsy" on YouTube

"Gypsy" is a song by British-American rock band Fleetwood Mac. The song was written by Stevie Nicks around 1979; the earliest demo recordings were made in early 1980 with Tom Moncrieff for possible inclusion on her debut solo album Bella Donna. When Nicks' close friend Robin Anderson died of leukemia, the song took on a new significance and Nicks dedicated the song to her in future performances. "Gypsy" was released on 18 August 1982 as the second single from the group's thirteenth studio album Mirage (1982), and was the second biggest hit from the album, following "Hold Me", peaking at number 12 on the Billboard Hot 100, and became a number one hit on contemporary hit radio.

In 2017, Nicks recorded an acoustic version to serve as the theme song for the Netflix drama series Gypsy.

== Background ==
Lyrically, "Gypsy" recounts the narrator’s early adulthood—with references to going to a clothing store in San Francisco—and reminisces about a bygone, carefree lifestyle. There are two points of inspiration behind "Gypsy", as stated by Stevie Nicks, the first of which is a nostalgia for her life before Fleetwood Mac. Before joining the group, Nicks lived with Lindsey Buckingham, who would also join Fleetwood Mac. Nicks and Buckingham were musical and romantic partners; however, only their musical partnership has survived. Nicks met Buckingham at a high school party, where he was singing "California Dreaming" by the Mamas and the Papas. Nicks joined in with perfect harmony, then they introduced themselves. They did not see each other again until college where they started a relationship and a musical duo called Buckingham Nicks. They barely got by with the income from Nicks' work as a waitress and cleaning lady.

They could not afford a bed frame, so they slept on a mattress directly on the floor. Nicks says the mattress was decorated in lace, with a vase and a flower at its side. Whenever she feels her famous life getting to her, she goes "back to her roots," and takes her mattress off the frame and puts it "back to the floor" and decorates it with "some lace, and paper flowers." On 31 March 2009, Nicks gave an interview to Entertainment Weekly discussing the inspiration for the song:

In the old days, before Fleetwood Mac, Lindsey [Buckingham] and I had no money, so we had a king-size mattress, but we just had it on the floor. I had old vintage coverlets on it, and even though we had no money it was still really pretty... Just that and a lamp on the floor, and that was it—there was a certain calmness about it. To this day, when I'm feeling cluttered, I will take my mattress off of my beautiful bed, wherever that may be, and put it outside my bedroom, with a table and a little lamp.

On 25 March 2009, during a show in Montreal, Quebec on Fleetwood Mac's Unleashed Tour, Nicks gave a short history of the inspiration behind "Gypsy". She explained it was written sometime in 1978–1979, when the band had become "very famous, very fast". It was a song that brought her back to an earlier time, to an apartment in San Francisco where she had taken the mattress off her bed and put it on the floor. To contextualize, Nicks voiced the lyrics: "So I'm back, to the velvet underground. Back to the floor, that I love. To a room with some lace and paper flowers. Back to the gypsy that I was." Those are the words: 'So I'm back to the velvet underground'—which is a clothing store in downtown San Francisco, where Janis Joplin got her clothes, and Grace Slick from Jefferson Airplane. It was this little hole in the wall, amazing, beautiful stuff—'back to the floor that I love, to a room with some lace and paper flowers, back to the gypsy that I was.'"

The band also played the song on other concert tours, including their 2018–2019 An Evening with Fleetwood Mac tour, which featured Mike Campbell on a Marxophone.

== Stevie Nicks and Robin Snyder Anderson ==
Nicks met and befriended Robin Snyder at Arcadia High School in Los Angeles when they were either 14 or 15. Snyder, who had theatrical interests, became Nicks' speech therapist. Videos of the two preparing for concerts are easily accessible over the internet, for instance, one video in particular where Snyder helps Nicks prepare for a concert during the Rumours Tour. Not only did she help her with her singing, but she was also her confidante, and the person who knew her best. According to Carol Ann Harris' book Storms, Snyder could calm her down within just a fraction of a second.

The night before Bella Donna was released, Nicks received a call from Snyder saying she had leukemia, and the doctors thought she would only live for three months. Nicks was also informed that Snyder had gotten pregnant so as to leave her husband, Kim Anderson, with something after she left. If Snyder chose to have an abortion, she could have possibly lived for another year. However, the baby was born (three months-premature), and Snyder died three days later. Nicks was on tour at the time of Snyder's death. The only person Nicks felt could understand her grief was Kim Anderson. He felt the same way, and out of grief, as well as a duty towards providing the baby (named Matthew) a good home, the two married.

However, three months later, Nicks filed for divorce after she "received a sign" from Snyder telling her to get out of there. Nicks has stated that she has put Matthew through college and told him about what had happened many times. As Snyder was dying, Nicks dedicated "Gypsy" to her. Nicks found it extremely difficult to sing the song in concert.

== Reception ==
Billboard described it as an "archetypal Stevie Nicks performance" and commented on the "lacy backing vocals and Lindsey Buckingham's chiming guitar lines." Cashbox commended the musicianship on the song, saying that the band played "with a lovely eloquence that no session folk could touch, especially the great Mick Fleetwood-John McVie rhythm section. The publication also thought that "Gypsy" would have also worked well on one of Nicks' solo albums. Record Mirror felt that Nicks' vocals had the "same effect on the ears as a tungsten tipped masonry bit" and predicted that the song would be commercially successful.

Mike Mettler of Sound & Vision labelled "Gypsy" as one of Nicks' best songs, saying that it was replete with "aural gems" such as the "full wash of wordless harmonies all throughout, Buckingham’s dual reads on 'lightning strikes / maybe once, maybe twice' ahead of his understated guitar solo, and Nicks extended 'ooooohs' in the back half." The Guardian and Paste ranked the song number nine and number seven, respectively, on their lists of the 30 greatest Fleetwood Mac songs.

== Music video ==
The video for the song, directed by Russell Mulcahy, was the highest-budget music video ever produced at the time. The video locations included a highly detailed portrayal of a forest and required many costumes and dancers. It was the very first "World Premiere Video" on MTV in 1982.

Interpersonal strife amongst the band members complicated the shoot, much as they had with the earlier video for "Hold Me". When he was pairing them during blocking, Mulcahy recalls, "people were pulling me aside saying, 'No, no. Those two were fucking and then they split up and now he's sleeping with her.' I got very confused, who was sleeping with whom."

Nicks especially remembers the experience as unpleasant. Two weeks before the shoot, she had gone into drug rehabilitation to try to overcome her cocaine addiction. However, the video shoot could not be rescheduled, and she had to take a break for it. Near the end of the first of three days of the shoot, Nicks was exhausted and said she needed cocaine. A small bottle was discreetly given to her, though it was thrown out before she could use any. Nicks later said, "I think we would probably have gone on to make many more great videos like 'Gypsy' had we not been so into drugs."

The aforementioned issues Nicks was having were further strained by having to work closely with her former boyfriend Lindsey Buckingham. "We weren't getting along well then. I didn't want to be anywhere near him; I certainly didn't want to be in his arms," Nicks said of the scene where the two are dancing. "If you watch the video, you'll see I wasn't happy. And he wasn't a very good dancer." In 1983, the music video received an award of Special Merit during the American Video Awards.

== B-side ==
The b-side of the "Gypsy" single [45 RPM] was "Cool Water," an acoustic performance featuring John McVie on backing vocals, a rare occurrence where McVie contributed his vocals to a Fleetwood Mac recording. The song was originally written in 1936 by Bob Nolan and has been covered by numerous artists over the years. The Fleetwood Mac version appears on the compilation album Revenge of the Killer B's, Volume 2, and has been released on the Deluxe Edition of the band's Mirage CD.

== Personnel ==
- Stevie Nicks – vocals
- Lindsey Buckingham – guitars, backing vocals
- Christine McVie – keyboards, backing vocals
- John McVie – bass guitar
- Mick Fleetwood – drums, percussion

== Charts ==
=== Weekly charts ===
Weekly chart performance for "Gypsy"
| Chart (1982–1983) | Peak position |
|---|---|
| Australia (Kent Music Report) | 17 |
| Canada Top Singles (RPM) | 16 |
| Canada Adult Contemporary (RPM) | 3 |
| Ireland (IRMA) | 25 |
| Netherlands (Dutch Top 40 Tipparade) | 6 |
| Netherlands (Single Top 100) | 42 |
| UK Singles (Official Charts) | 46 |
| US Billboard Hot 100 | 12 |
| US Adult Contemporary (Billboard) | 9 |
| US Mainstream Rock (Billboard) | 4 |
| US Cash Box Top 100 | 13 |
| US Adult Contemporary (Radio & Records) | 4 |
| US Contemporary Hit Radio (Radio & Records) | 1 |
| West Germany (GfK) | 35 |

| Chart (2020) | Peak position |
|---|---|
| US Hot Rock & Alternative Songs (Billboard) | 21 |

=== Year-end charts ===
1982 year-end chart performance for "Gypsy"
| Chart (1982) | Position |
|---|---|
| US Cash Box Top 100 | 83 |
| US Adult Contemporary (Radio & Records) | 47 |
| US Contemporary Hit Radio (Radio & Records) | 21 |

== Certifications ==
| Region | Certification | Certified units/sales |
|---|---|---|
| New Zealand (RMNZ) | 5× Platinum | 150,000^{‡} |
| United Kingdom (BPI) | Platinum | 600,000^{‡} |
^{‡} Sales+streaming figures based on certification alone.
