= Second Hand News =

1976 song by Lindsey Buckingham

Song by Fleetwood Mac

from the album Rumours
- Released: February 4, 1977
- Recorded: 1976
- Genre: Folk rock, pop rock
- Length: 2:43
- Label: Warner Bros.
- Songwriter: Lindsey Buckingham
- Producers: Fleetwood Mac, Ken Caillat & Richard Dashut

"Second Hand News" is a song written by Lindsey Buckingham. The song was recorded by the British-American rock band Fleetwood Mac as the opening track of their 1977 album Rumours.

== Background ==
"Second Hand News" was a frontrunner for the lead track off of the album Rumours. According to author Jacob Hoye, its opening lines "I know there's nothing to say/Someone has taken my place" set the mood for the entire album. "Second Hand News" is one of several songs on Rumours that reflects the romantic breakup of Buckingham and bandmate Stevie Nicks. The song was inspired by the redemption Buckingham was finding in other women after the failed relationship with Nicks. He sings that although he does not trust his lover and cannot live with her, he cannot live without her either. Fleetwood Mac biographer Donald Brackett highlights the irony of lines such as "One thing I think you should know/I ain't gonna miss you when you go."

According to Buckingham, the song incorporates Scottish and Irish folk song influences. Buckingham originally introduced the song to the band on the guitar without any lyrics, with the working title of "Strummer." "Strummer" has appeared on various reissues of "Rumours", including the 3-disc edition released in 2013. Buckingham initially withheld the lyrics to avoid getting into an argument with Nicks over them.

== Recording ==
The band initially played the song in a march rhythm, although Buckingham suggested a disco-like groove for the song after hearing the Bee Gees' "Jive Talkin'". Buckingham and co-producer Richard Dashut built up the song with four audio tracks of electric guitar and the use of chair percussion to evoke Celtic rock. A Naugahyde chair was struck with drum sticks to create the unusual percussion sound. To achieve a bright and ringy snare drum, Caillat and Richard Dashut tuned the instrument high and placed it in a large vocal booth. They miked a speaker situated in another room and layered the sounds from the device onto the snare drum track.

Originally, John McVie contributed a bass part that Ken Caillat described as "melodic" and "flowing". However, when McVie was on vacation, Buckingham put down his own bassline, one that was very simple, just quarter notes. "It worked, though," said Caillat. "Buckingham had a grand plan in his head, and he got his way. This was the start of him really calling the shots. It became a ‘my way or the highway' thing with him, which he perfected on the Tusk album." McVie would eventually rerecord the bass guitar part in accordance with Buckingham's instructions, but he made slight changes to make the part his own.

Around late May, Buckingham suggested that Fleetwood play an "aggressive" tom-tom part during the choruses. Buckingham mimed the parts for him in the control room, which Caillat described in his 2012 book, Making of Rumours. "It looked as if Lindsey was showing Mick how to kill a snake with his bare fists. He was screaming out the drumbeats with his voice, while his arms flailed wildly in rhythm. It was a very young and aggressive drum part, much in keeping with the bass part he wanted to get from John." After five to six takes, Fleetwood suggested that Buckingham record the part to demonstrate how it should be played. Upon hearing the playback, Fleetwood decided that Buckingham was better equipped to record the tom-tom fills. During the same day, Fleetwood spent several hours overdubbing some splash cymbal crashes; the band later kept the cymbal ad-libs they believed sounded the best, although Fleetwood later expressed his disappointment over the final result. "My version is in very random places. They don't really make any sense. They're in time, but they're in very odd places, and they're not uniform."

During the guitar solo, Buckingham overlaid a wordless vocal to enhance the effect. Music journalist Chuck Eddy uses this as a prime example of rock musicians using vocals as a bassline. According to author Cath Carroll, Buckingham's "syncopated scat singing" on this part and his singing on the "vigorous chorus" provides energy to the song. Carroll also praises Mick Fleetwood's drumming on the chorus as being some of his best. Carroll sums up the song by stating that "the romping acoustic guitars, pounding piano, and vigorous vocals combine in the final mix as an exuberant and hyper-rhythmic whole."

== Critical reception ==
Pitchfork critic Jessica Hopper describes "Second Hand News" as "perhaps the most euphoric ode to rebound chicks ever written." She describes it as being similar to the hit single "Go Your Own Way" in being "upbeat but totally fuck you." Rolling Stone magazine critic John Swenson claimed that "Second Hand News" was almost as good as "Go Your Own Way." He says that despite being about the breakup of his relationship with Nicks, the song is "anything but morose, and completely outdoes the Eagles in the kiss-off genre." Musically, Swenson claims that "the chunking acoustic guitar rhythm carries the song to a joyful chorus," resulting in "timeless pop harmony." Hoye considers "Second Hand News" to be an example of one of the lesser-known songs on Rumours that is "just as great as the hits." Author Tracie Ratiner describes "Second Hand News" as one of Fleetwood Mac's "trademark songs." BBC critic Daryl Easlea calls the refrain "euphoric." Classic Rock History critic Millie Zeiler rated it Buckingham's 4th best song with Fleetwood Mac.

== Other appearances ==
"Second Hand News" was included on the Fleetwood Mac compilation albums 25 Years – The Chain (1992), The Very Best of Fleetwood Mac (2002) and 50 Years – Don't Stop (2018). The track has also appeared on a couple of live set lists, including their 2013 tour and their 2018-2019 An Evening with Fleetwood Mac tour.

== Personnel ==
- Lindsey Buckingham – electric guitars, acoustic guitar, chair percussion, tom toms, lead vocals
- Stevie Nicks – backing vocals
- Christine McVie – organ, backing vocals
- John McVie – bass guitar
- Mick Fleetwood – drums

== Certifications ==
Region	Certification	Certified units/sales
New Zealand (RMNZ)	Platinum	30,000^{‡}
United Kingdom (BPI)	Gold	400,000^{‡}
^{‡} Sales+streaming figures based on certification alone.

== Cover versions ==
"Second Hand News"

Single by Julienne Taylor

from the album Racing the Clouds Home
- B-side: "Rose of the Sweethay"/"Woolball"
- Released: 2000
- Genre: Pop
- Length: 2:45
- Songwriter: Lindsey Buckingham

Mates of State covered "Second Hand News" on their 2010 album Crushes (The Covers Mixtape). Mates of State member Jason Hammel suggested that this was "the weirdest" challenge they faced on the album. The Mates of State version begins with a reggae beat, which Hammel thought people might hate, but felt that "if people need to be stoned to enjoy this one, so be it."

Tonic covered the song on the 1998 tribute album Legacy: A Tribute to Fleetwood Mac's Rumours.

Julienne Taylor covered the song on her 2002 album Racing the Clouds Home and as a single.

Kid Rock sampled "Second Hand News" for the bassline of his 1998 song "Wasting Time."
