= Hérouville-en-Vexin =

- Commune
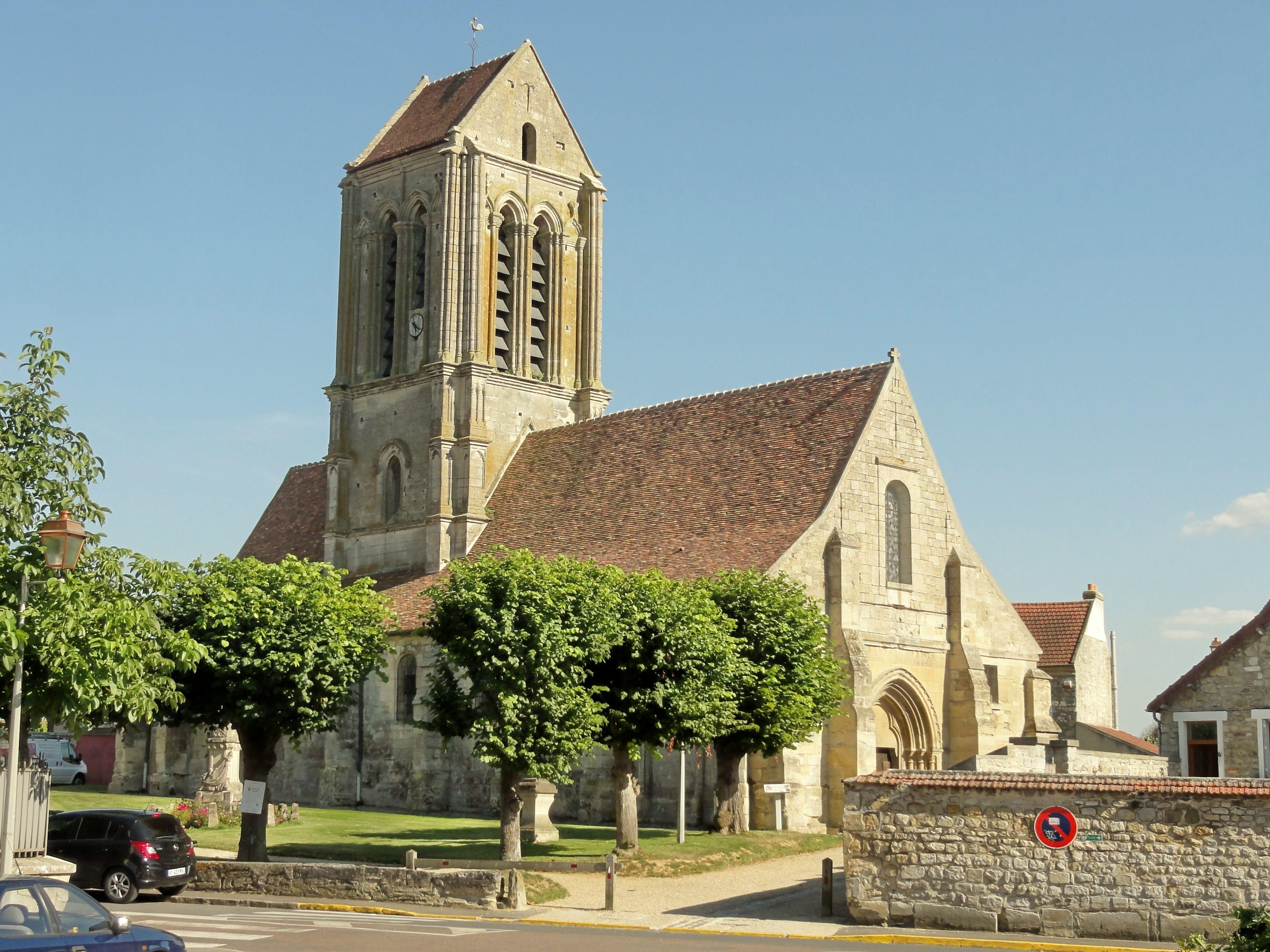
- The church of Saint-Clair, in Hérouville

- Coat of arms
- Location of Hérouville-en-Vexin
- Location within France Location within Île-de-France (region)
- Coordinates: 49°06′07″N 2°08′01″E
- Country: France
- Region: Île-de-France
- Department: Val-d'Oise
- Arrondissement: Pontoise
- Canton: Saint-Ouen-l'Aumône
- Intercommunality: Sausseron Impressionistes

Government
  - Mayor (2020–2026): Eric Baert
- Area^{1}: 8.42 km^{2} (3.25 sq mi)
- Highest elevation: 120 m (390 ft)
- Lowest elevation: 81 m (266 ft)
- Population (2023): 584
  - Density: 69.4/km^{2} (180/sq mi)
- Time zone: UTC+01:00 (CET)
  - Summer (DST): UTC+02:00 (CEST)
- INSEE/Postal code: 95308 /95300
- ^{1} French Land Register data, which excludes lakes, ponds, glaciers > 1 km^{2} (0.386 sq mi or 247 acres) and river estuaries.

Hérouville-en-Vexin (French pronunciation: [eʁuvil ɑ̃ vɛksɛ̃], literally Hérouville in Vexin; before 2017: Hérouville) is a commune in the Val-d'Oise department in Île-de-France in northern France.

== See also ==
- Château d'Hérouville
- Communes of the Val-d'Oise department
