= Hold Me (Fleetwood Mac song) =

1982 single by Fleetwood Mac

Single by Fleetwood Mac

from the album Mirage
- B-side: "Eyes of the World"
- Released: June 1982
- Recorded: 1981
- Genre: Pop rock
- Length: 3:44
- Label: Warner Bros.
- Songwriters: Christine McVie; Robbie Patton
- Producers: Lindsey Buckingham; Fleetwood Mac; Ken Caillat; Richard Dashut

Fleetwood Mac singles chronology
"Fireflies" (1981)	"Hold Me" (1982)	"Gypsy" (1982)

"Hold Me" is a 1982 song by the British-American rock group Fleetwood Mac. It was the first track to be released as a single from the band's thirteenth album Mirage. Written by Christine McVie and Robbie Patton, McVie and Lindsey Buckingham shared lead vocals on the song. The single reached number 4 on the US Billboard Hot 100, the band's first to break the top five since 1977.

== Background ==
According to Mick Fleetwood in his 1990 autobiography, "Hold Me" was written about McVie's failed relationship with Dennis Wilson of The Beach Boys. When McVie presented "Hold Me" to the band, the song was still unfinished, so the band left portions of the song open to develop throughout the Mirage sessions.

McVie said that the incorporation of Buckingham's vocals was unplanned. Patton had previously sung the lower parts early in the composition process. During one of the recording sessions, Lindsey Buckingham suggested that he and McVie perform "Hold Me" as a duet similar to "Don't Stop". McVie and Buckingham sang their parts with the studio windows open over the Paris countryside.

Musically, the song opens with a piano intro and features electric guitar strumming that Mike Mettler of Sound & Vision likened to a muted cowbell. The song also includes motifs played on a twelve string guitar, various percussion such as a tambourine and congas, and "come on and" chants.

== Release ==
Released in June 1982 in advance of the album itself, the song debuted at number 33 on the US Billboard Hot 100, which up to that point was the band's highest entry on the Hot 100. Previously, their highest debut on the Hot 100 was "Sara", which entered the chart at number 45. It became one of Fleetwood Mac's biggest hits in the United States, peaking at No. 4 for a then-record seven consecutive weeks, from July 24, 1982, to September 4, 1982. Potential higher chart placement was prevented by songs including "Eye of the Tiger" by Survivor and "Abracadabra" by the Steve Miller Band, as well as the No. 2 peaking of "Hurts So Good" by John Cougar. "Hold Me" ranked at No. 31 on the Billboard Year-End Hot 100 singles of 1982. BMI listed "Hold Me" as one of their most played songs of 1982.

In the United Kingdom, "Hold Me" was released in June 1982 and failed to enter the top 75. The song reached number 88 on the Record Business chart and number 30 on the publication's Airplay Guide. It also appeared on the Bubbling Under portion of the Music Week chart, an extension of the top 75. "Hold Me" was re-issued in the UK in February 1989 to promote the group's recently released Greatest Hits (1988) package with "No Questions Asked" as the B-side and reached No. 94. On 30th January 2026, the song was certified Silver by the British Phonographic Industry for sales/equivalent streams of over 200,000 copies.

The song is also included on the 2002 US version, and 2009 UK re-issue of the greatest hits album The Very Best of Fleetwood Mac.

== Critical reception ==
Professional ratings
Review scores
Source	Rating
Number One	3/5 stars

Cashbox said that "the catchy hook, the solid rhythm and, of course, the female harmonies all come together in a package that can't be beat." Billboard called it a "buoyant midtempo love song" and predicted that the single would become a "summer playlist fixture."

Sandy Robertson of Sounds labelled "Hold Me" as an "ecstatic, catchy rave-up of slinky repetition" that was one of the two best songs on Mirage along with "Only Over You". Writing for BAM magazine, Blair Jackson said that "Hold Me" was "probably the most instantly appealing" song on Mirage and thought that Buckingham and McVie sang the song "beautifully" together.

Matthew Greenwald of AllMusic praised "Hold Me" as a "gorgeous Christine McVie creation" that "goes to all of the right places at the right times." Paste ranked the song number 16 on its list of the 30 greatest Fleetwood Mac songs, saying that it had "a construction to it that will never age." Rolling Stone ranked the song 26th on their list of the 50 greatest Fleetwood Mac songs.

== Music video ==
The music video for "Hold Me" features the band in a surreal scenario set in a desert, in keeping with the album title, based on several René Magritte paintings. In the video, Christine McVie is in a room surrounded by paintings, using a telescope to search for Lindsey Buckingham in the desert. Buckingham discovers Stevie Nicks lying on a chaise longue and paints a portrait of her. In other scenes, John McVie and Mick Fleetwood are archaeologists, dressed in khaki shorts and pith helmets. They find the desert littered with broken mirrors, which serve as a motif in the video, along with partially buried pianos, electric guitars, bass guitars, and other instruments.

Due to the band members' strained relationships at the time, the video shoot in the Mojave Desert was a "nightmare," according to producer Simon Fields. "[They] were, um, not easy to work with," agreed Steve Barron, who directed the clip. Most scenes feature only one or two band members at a time and the entire band is never seen together.

The shooting of the music video began around 5 a.m., an effort to mitigate the amount of heat exposure in the Mojave Desert. However, this proved to be insufficient. "It was so hot, and we weren't getting along," recalls Nicks. Buckingham was still not over their breakup six years earlier, nor her subsequent affair with Fleetwood. Further, she elaborates, the rest of the band was angry with Fleetwood because he had then begun an affair with Nicks' best friend, causing serious issues for Nicks.

"Four of them, I can't recall which four, couldn't be together in the same room for very long. They didn't want to be there," says Barron. "Christine McVie was about ten hours out of the makeup trailer. By which time it was getting dark." According to Fields, "John McVie was drunk and tried to punch me. Stevie Nicks didn't want to walk on the sand with her platforms. Christine McVie was fed up with all of them. Mick thought she was being a bitch, he wouldn't talk to her."

== Track listing ==
7-inch single (US) (Warner Bros / 7-29966)

A. "Hold Me" — 3:42
B. "Eyes of the World" — 3:41

12-inch promotional single (US) (Warner Bros / PRO-A-1040)

1. "Hold Me" — 3:42 (both sides)

== Personnel ==
- Lindsey Buckingham – twelve-string acoustic guitar, electric guitar, lead (dual lead in harmony with C. McVie) and backing vocals
- Christine McVie – piano, Yamaha CP30 electric piano, lead (dual lead in harmony with Buckingham) and backing vocals
- John McVie – bass guitar
- Mick Fleetwood – drums, tambourine, congas

== Charts ==
=== Weekly charts ===
Chart (1982)	Peak position
Australia (Kent Music Report)	12
Belgium (Ultratop 50 Flanders)	14
Canada Top Singles (RPM)	9
Canada Adult Contemporary (RPM)	6
Netherlands (Dutch Top 40)	20
Netherlands (Single Top 100)	25
New Zealand (Recorded Music NZ)	45
US Billboard Hot 100	4
US Adult Contemporary (Billboard)	7
US Mainstream Rock (Billboard)	3
US Cashbox Top 100	3
US Adult Contemporary (Radio & Records)	6
US Contemporary Hit Radio (Radio & Records)	2
West Germany (GfK)	64

Chart (1989)	Peak position
UK Singles (Official Charts)	94

=== Year-end charts ===
Chart (1982)	Rank
Australia (Kent Music Report)	79
Canada Top Singles (RPM)	90
US Billboard Hot 100	31
US Cash Box Top 100	19
US Adult Contemporary (Radio & Records)	33
US Contemporary Hit Radio (Radio & Records)	9

== Bibliography ==
- The Great Rock Discography, Martin C. Strong, p. 378. (2000), ISBN 9781841950174
