= Rumours Live =

Live album by Fleetwood Mac
- Released: 8 September 2023
- Recorded: 29 August 1977
- Venues: The Forum, Inglewood, California
- Genre: Rock
- Length: 87:41
- Labels: Rhino; Warner

Fleetwood Mac chronology
Before the Beginning: 1968–1970 Live & Demo Sessions (2019)	Rumours Live (2023)	Mirage Tour '82 (2024)

Rumours Live is a live album by the British-American rock band Fleetwood Mac, released on 8 September 2023 through Rhino Entertainment. The tracks were recorded on 29 August 1977 at the Forum in Inglewood, California, during the Rumours Tour.

== Overview ==
Rumours Live is the first album released by Fleetwood Mac since the death of Christine McVie in November 2022.

The album's tracks were recorded during the band's opening night at the Forum, on 29 August 1977, by Ken Caillat using a mobile recording truck from the Record Plant, the studio where the band recorded part of Rumours. The show was attended by close to 20,000 people. At the time, Rumours held the No. 1 spot on the Billboard 200 chart and would go on to sell more than 40 million copies worldwide.

In addition to Rumours, the set list comprises tracks from Fleetwood Mac's 1975's self-titled album, as well as "Oh Well", which was written by Fleetwood Mac founder Peter Green and released as a single in 1969. The concert's tracks were previously unreleased, except for "Gold Dust Woman", which appeared on the 2021 deluxe edition of Live. The live versions of "Dreams" and "Go Your Own Way" preceded the album's release.

Rumours Live was issued in two formats: a two-CD set and a double LP gatefold vinyl edition, pressed on 180 g black vinyl, with lacquers cut by Chris Bellman at Bernie Grundman Mastering. A clear vinyl version of the LP was also manufactured.

Sam Graham wrote in the album's liner notes that the live versions of the songs are more "muscular, more ferocious, than the album recordings," adding that they are driven the rhythm section "powerhouse" of Mick Fleetwood and John McVie and Lindsey Buckingham's "febrile guitar playing". He said that instead of a "rote recital of the hits, the group stretches out in concert, as songs like 'Rhiannon', 'World Turning' and 'I'm So Afraid' blossom into exuberant tours de force onstage."

== Critical reception ==
Professional ratings
Review scores
Source	Rating
AllMusic	4/5 stars

Stephen Thomas Erlewine of AllMusic said that Rumours Live showcased "a rock band hitting their stride, still a little ragged and raw, happy to be playing to an enthusiastic large crowd" rather than a "well-oiled machine that's comfortable playing to the rafters of an arena." He noted that the band performed with a "verve and vigor that enlivens songs which have become perhaps overly familiar in their immaculate studio renditions."

Consequence's Jo Vito described the energy as "palpable" when listening to the version of "Dreams" from the album, arguing that while "Stevie Nicks' inimitable voice and top-notch songwriting" take center stage, "the rhythm section of Mick Fleetwood and John McVie augments the song to a level the album version never reaches." He added that the track, played at a faster tempo, feels "more punchy, more lively, as if you can feel the band playing off the excitement of the audience."

Megan LaPierre of Exclaim! thought that Rumours Live feels "like lightning captured in a bottle". She concluded by saying that "just when you thought you had memorized every dip and grove in your Rumours vinyl, you get to hear Fleetwood Mac reinvent their best work – back when the dough was still fresh for the kneading."

== Track listing ==
The album was released as a double LP, divided into two records. It includes live performances of tracks from Fleetwood Mac (1975), Rumours (1977), as well as the 1969 song "Oh Well".

=== Record one ===
Side one
No.	Title	Writer(s)	Length
1.	"Say You Love Me"	Christine McVie	4:31
2.	"Monday Morning"	Lindsey Buckingham	3:27
3.	"Dreams"	Stevie Nicks	4:08
4.	"Oh Well"	Peter Green	3:03
5.	"Rhiannon"	Nicks	8:05

Side two
No.	Title	Writer(s)	Length
1.	"Oh Daddy"	C. McVie	4:54
2.	"Never Going Back Again"	Buckingham	2:48
3.	"Landslide"	Nicks	4:17
4.	"Over My Head"	C. McVie	3:27
5.	"Gold Dust Woman"	Nicks	7:19
Total length:			45:59

=== Record two ===
Side three
No.	Title	Writer(s)	Length
1.	"You Make Loving Fun"	C. McVie	4:48
2.	"I'm So Afraid"	Buckingham	5:47
3.	"Go Your Own Way"	Buckingham	5:00
4.	"World Turning"	C. McVie; Buckingham	7:44

Side four
No.	Title	Writer(s)	Length
1.	"Blue Letter"	Richard Curtis; Michael Curtis	5:38
2.	"The Chain"	Buckingham; Mick Fleetwood; C. McVie; John McVie; Nicks	5:39
3.	"Second Hand News"	Buckingham	3:17
4.	"Songbird"	C. McVie	4:08
Total length:			42:01

== Personnel ==
Fleetwood Mac

- Mick Fleetwood – drums, percussion
- John McVie – bass
- Christine McVie – keyboards, synthesizer, vocals
- Lindsey Buckingham – guitars, vocals
- Stevie Nicks – vocals

Production

- Ken Caillat – recording (at The Fabulous Forum, Inglewood, California)
- Bill Inglot, Steve Woolard – production for release
- Brian Dodd – product manager
- Brian Kehew, Bill Inglot – mixing (at Timeless, North Hollywood)
- Dan Hersch – mastering (at D2, Los Angeles)
- Chris Bellman – lacquers (at Bernie Grundman Mastering, Hollywood)
- Rory Wilson – art direction, design
- Kristin Attaway – packaging manager
- Herbert Worthington III – photography

Project assistance

- Sheryl Farber
- Mike Johnson
- Amelia Halverson
- Susanne Savage
- John Strother
- Mike Wilson

Management

- Sheryl Louis – CSM Management
- Carl Stubner, Blain Clausen – Shelter Music Group
- Martin Wyatt – Bright Music
- Matt Sadie, Simon White – C3 Management

== Charts ==
Chart performance for Rumours Live
Chart (2023)	Peak position
Australian Albums (ARIA)	108
French Albums (SNEP)	51
Hungarian Albums (MAHASZ)	32
Japanese Hot Albums (Billboard Japan)	62
New Zealand Albums (RMNZ)	32
Portuguese Albums (AFP)	26
Scottish Albums (Official Charts)	6
Spanish Albums (Promusicae)	80
UK Albums (Official Charts)	34
US Billboard 200	81
US Top Rock Albums (Billboard)	14
