= Tusk Tour =

1979–80 concert tour by Fleetwood Mac

Tusk World Tour
- Tour by Fleetwood Mac
- Promotional poster for the tour
- Associated album: Tusk
- Start date: October 26, 1979
- End date: September 1, 1980
- Legs: 6
- No. of shows: 112

Fleetwood Mac concert chronology
- Rumours Tour (1977–78); Tusk Tour (1979–80); Mirage Tour (1982)

The Tusk Tour was a world concert tour by British-American rock band Fleetwood Mac. The tour began on October 26, 1979, in Pocatello, Idaho and ended on September 1, 1980, in Hollywood, California. The band's 1980 Live album contains many of the live recordings of songs from the Tusk Tour.

== History ==
In 1979, Fleetwood Mac embarked on their 112 show-long world tour promoting their new album, Tusk. The tour began in Pocatello, Idaho on October 26, 1979 at the ASISU Minidome and ended September 1, 1980 at the Hollywood Bowl, both of which were sold-out shows. Every one of their shows performed were filmed and recorded for their Live album.

The band adjusted the setlist throughout the tour: "Say You Love Me" served as the first song of the opening night in Pocatello and "Monday Morning" opened the set for their final tour in Los Angeles. Kate Bush declined an offer to open for Fleetwood Mac on this tour, so Danny Douma and Christopher Cross served as the opening act instead depending on the performance.

Starting with the Tusk Tour, Buckingham began to use a Model 1 guitar developed by Rick Turner. The instrument was equipped with a mahogany body, a rosewood fingerboard, and a single pickup with semi-parametric EQ. After playing the Model 1 during a rehearsal, Buckingham decided to make the instrument his primary guitar onstage, supplanting his Gibson Les Paul and Fender Stratocaster in the process.

=== Setbacks ===
Christine McVie mentioned that "somebody once said that with the money we spent on champagne on one night they could have made an entire album. I used to go onstage and drink a bottle of Dom Pérignon, and drink one offstage afterwards . It's not the kind of party I’d like to go to now. There was a lot of booze being drunk and there was blood floating around in the alcohol, which doesn’t make for a stable environment." The band members indulged in heavy amounts of cocaine and marijuana during the tour. McVie joked that the strength of the marijuana was so strong that the actual act of smoking was not needed to feel the effects of the drug.

As the tour progressed, the band members became less fond of each other. As a result of this tension and the financial setbacks endured, the band members were "barely able to stand the sight of each other". While in Auckland, New Zealand in 1980, Stevie Nicks said that Buckingham began to mimic her by pulling his jacket up over his head to mirror what she did stylistically with her shawl during this performance.

== Set lists ==
=== North American leg 1979 #1 ===
1. "Say You Love Me"
2. "The Chain"
3. "Dreams"
4. "Not That Funny"
5. "Rhiannon"
6. "Over & Over"
7. "Oh Well"
8. "Sara"
9. "What Makes You Think You're the One"
10. "Oh Daddy"
11. "Save Me a Place"
12. "Landslide"
13. "Tusk"
14. "Angel"
15. "You Make Loving Fun"
16. "I'm So Afraid"
17. "World Turning"
18. "Go Your Own Way"
19. "Sisters of the Moon"
20. "Blue Letter"
21. "Songbird"

=== North American leg 1979 #2 ===
1. "Say You Love Me"
2. "The Chain"
3. "Dreams"
4. "Not That Funny"
5. "Rhiannon"
6. "Don't Stop"
7. "Oh Well"
8. "Sara"
9. "What Makes You Think You're the One"
10. "Oh Daddy"
11. "Save Me a Place"
12. "Landslide"
13. "Tusk"
14. "Angel"
15. "You Make Loving Fun"
16. "I'm So Afraid"
17. "World Turning"
18. "Go Your Own Way"
19. "Sisters of the Moon"
20. "Blue Letter"
21. "Songbird"

=== North American leg 1979 #3 ===
1. "Say You Love Me"
2. "The Chain"
3. "Don't Stop"
4. "Dreams"
5. "Oh Well"
6. "Rhiannon"
7. "Oh Daddy"
8. "What Makes You Think You're the One"
9. "Sara"
10. "Not That Funny"
11. "Save Me a Place"
12. "Landslide"
13. "Tusk"
14. "Angel"
15. "You Make Loving Fun"
16. "I'm So Afraid"
17. "World Turning"
18. "Blue Letter"
19. "Go Your Own Way"
20. "Sisters of the Moon"
21. "Second Hand News"
22. "Songbird"

=== Japan, Oceania, second North American leg ===
1. "Say You Love Me"
2. "The Chain"
3. "Don't Stop"
4. "Dreams"
5. "Oh Well"
6. "Rhiannon"
7. "Oh Daddy"
8. "What Makes You Think You're the One"
9. "Sara"
10. "Not That Funny"
11. "Never Going Back Again"
12. "Landslide"
13. "Tusk"
14. "Angel"
15. "You Make Loving Fun"
16. "I'm So Afraid"
17. "World Turning"
18. "Go Your Own Way"
19. "Sisters of the Moon"
20. "Songbird"

=== European leg ===
1. "Say You Love Me"
2. "The Chain"
3. "Don't Stop"
4. "Dreams"
5. "Oh Well"
6. "Rhiannon"
7. "Oh Daddy"
8. "That's Enough for Me"
9. "Sara"
10. "Not That Funny"
11. "Never Going Back Again"
12. "Landslide"
13. "Tusk"
14. "Angel"
15. "You Make Loving Fun"
16. "I'm So Afraid"
17. "World Turning"
18. "Go Your Own Way"
19. "Sisters of the Moon"
20. "Songbird"

=== North American leg 1980 ===
1. "Monday Morning"
2. "The Chain"
3. "Don't Stop"
4. "Dreams"
5. "Oh Well"
6. "Rhiannon"
7. "Over and Over"
8. "What Makes You Think You're the One"
9. "Sara"
10. "Not That Funny"
11. "Never Going Back Again"
12. "Landslide"
13. "Tusk"
14. "Think About Me"
15. "I'm So Afraid"
16. "Angel"
17. "You Make Loving Fun"
18. "World Turning"
19. "Go Your Own Way"
20. "Sisters of the Moon"
21. "Songbird"

"The Ledge" and "I Know I'm Not Wrong" were rehearsed before this tour, but it is unknown if they were performed.

== Tour dates ==
Date	City	Country	Venue	Attendance	Revenue
North America
October 26, 1979	Pocatello	United States	Minidome	—N/a	—N/a
October 27, 1979	Ogden	United States	Dee Events Center	—N/a	—N/a
October 28, 1979	Salt Lake City	United States	Salt Palace	—N/a	—N/a
October 31, 1979	Denver	United States	McNichols Arena	20,978 / 25,000	$299,714
November 1, 1979	Denver	United States	McNichols Arena	20,978 / 25,000	$299,714
November 2, 1979	Albuquerque	United States	Tingley Coliseum	10,700 / 10,700	$107,000
November 5, 1979	St. Louis	United States	Checkerdome	25,200 / 25,200	$303,353
November 6, 1979	St. Louis	United States	Checkerdome	25,200 / 25,200	$303,353
November 7, 1979	Cincinnati	United States	Riverfront Coliseum	12,639 / 17,000	$174,348
November 10, 1979	New Haven	United States	New Haven Coliseum	9,635 / 9,635	$135,647
November 11, 1979	Uniondale	United States	Nassau Coliseum	—N/a	—N/a
November 12, 1979	Uniondale	United States	Nassau Coliseum	—N/a	—N/a
November 15, 1979	New York City	United States	Madison Square Garden	34,958 / 34,958	$438,254
November 16, 1979	New York City	United States	Madison Square Garden	34,958 / 34,958	$438,254
November 17, 1979	Boston	United States	Boston Garden	12,491 / 15,000	$183,333
November 20, 1979	Rochester	United States	Rochester Community War Memorial	—N/a	—N/a
November 21, 1979	Philadelphia	United States	The Spectrum	15,109 / 18,000	$194,504
November 22, 1979	Providence	United States	Providence Civic Center	10,699 / 12,000	$127,319
November 25, 1979	Landover	United States	Capital Centre	—N/a	—N/a
November 26, 1979	Pittsburgh	United States	Civic Arena	—N/a	—N/a
November 29, 1979	Ann Arbor	United States	Crisler Arena	10,212	$123,843
November 30, 1979	Champaign	United States	Assembly Hall	—N/a	—N/a
December 1, 1979	Cedar Falls	United States	UNI-Dome	25,556	$255,560
December 4, 1979	Inglewood	United States	The Forum	69,017 / 69,017 (Note: This box office score data is representative of all shows in Inglewood.)	$916,668
December 5, 1979	Inglewood	United States	The Forum	69,017 / 69,017	$916,668
December 6, 1979	Inglewood	United States	The Forum	69,017 / 69,017	$916,668
December 9, 1979	San Diego	United States	San Diego Sports Arena	11,748 / 11,748	$143,278
December 10, 1979	Inglewood	United States	The Forum		
December 11, 1979	Inglewood	United States	The Forum		
December 14, 1979	Daly City	United States	Cow Palace	33,858 / 33,858	$384,779
December 15, 1979	Daly City	United States	Cow Palace	33,858 / 33,858	$384,779
December 16, 1979	Daly City	United States	Cow Palace	33,858 / 33,858	$384,779
Asia
February 3, 1980	Tokyo	Japan	Nippon Budokan	—N/a	—N/a
February 4, 1980	Tokyo	Japan	Nippon Budokan	—N/a	—N/a
February 5, 1980	Tokyo	Japan	Nippon Budokan	—N/a	—N/a
February 8, 1980	Kyoto	Japan	Kyoto Kaikan	—N/a	—N/a
February 9, 1980	Gifu	Japan	Shimin Kaikan	—N/a	—N/a
February 11, 1980	Sapporo	Japan	Kuseinenkin Hall	—N/a	—N/a
February 13, 1980	Yokohama	Japan	Kenmin Hall	—N/a	—N/a
February 14, 1980	Sendai	Japan	Kenmin Hall	—N/a	—N/a
February 16, 1980	Osaka	Japan	Osaka Festival Hall	—N/a	—N/a
February 17, 1980	Osaka	Japan	Osaka Festival Hall	—N/a	—N/a
Oceania
February 21, 1980	Perth	Australia	Perth Entertainment Centre	—N/a	—N/a
February 22, 1980	Perth	Australia	Perth Entertainment Centre	—N/a	—N/a
February 25, 1980	Adelaide	Australia	Tennis Stadium	—N/a	—N/a
February 27, 1980	Sydney	Australia	Hordern Pavilion	—N/a	—N/a
February 28, 1980	Sydney	Australia	Hordern Pavilion	—N/a	—N/a
March 1, 1980	Melbourne	Australia	Melbourne Festival Hall	—N/a	—N/a
March 2, 1980	Melbourne	Australia	Melbourne Festival Hall	—N/a	—N/a
March 3, 1980	Melbourne	Australia	Melbourne Festival Hall	—N/a	—N/a
March 7, 1980	Brisbane	Australia	Brisbane Festival Hall	—N/a	—N/a
March 8, 1980	Brisbane	Australia	Brisbane Festival Hall	—N/a	—N/a
March 11, 1980	Melbourne	Australia	Festival Hall	—N/a	—N/a
March 12, 1980	Melbourne	Australia	Festival Hall	—N/a	—N/a
March 15, 1980	Sydney	Australia	Hordern Pavilion	—N/a	—N/a
March 16, 1980	Sydney	Australia	Hordern Pavilion	—N/a	—N/a
March 17, 1980	Sydney	Australia	Hordern Pavilion	—N/a	—N/a
March 20, 1980	Wellington	New Zealand	Athletic Park	—N/a	—N/a
March 22, 1980	Auckland	New Zealand	Western Springs Stadium	—N/a	—N/a
North America
March 27, 1980	Honolulu	United States	Neal S. Blaisdell Center	22,500 / 22,500	$287,225
March 28, 1980	Honolulu	United States	Neal S. Blaisdell Center	22,500 / 22,500	$287,225
March 29, 1980	Honolulu	United States	Neal S. Blaisdell Center	22,500 / 22,500	$287,225
April 30, 1980	Portland	United States	Portland Memorial Coliseum	11,000 / 11,000	$137,238
May 1, 1980	Seattle	United States	Hec Edmundson Pavilion	9,215 / 9,215	$114,188
May 2, 1980	Vancouver	Canada	Pacific Coliseum	—N/a	—N/a
May 5, 1980	Edmonton	Canada	Northlands Coliseum	25,851 / 25,851	$322,593
May 6, 1980	Edmonton	Canada	Northlands Coliseum	25,851 / 25,851	$322,593
May 9, 1980	Bloomington	United States	Metropolitan Sports Center	27,404 / 27,404	$319,005
May 10, 1980	Bloomington	United States	Metropolitan Sports Center	27,404 / 27,404	$319,005
May 11, 1980	Madison	United States	Dane County Coliseum	10,100 / 10,100	$111,000
May 14, 1980	Rosemont	United States	Rosemont Horizon	—N/a	—N/a
May 15, 1980	Rosemont	United States	Rosemont Horizon	—N/a	—N/a
May 16, 1980	Indianapolis	United States	Market Square Arena	—N/a	—N/a
May 19, 1980	Buffalo	United States	Buffalo Memorial Auditorium	13,777 / 17,000	$187,974
May 20, 1980	Richfield	United States	Richfield Coliseum	28,037 / 28,037	$308,407
May 21, 1980	Richfield	United States	Richfield Coliseum	28,037 / 28,037	$308,407
May 23, 1980	Detroit	United States	Joe Louis Arena	23,747 / 23,747	$291,455
May 24, 1980	Detroit	United States	Joe Louis Arena	23,747 / 23,747	$291,455
Europe
June 1, 1980	Munich	West Germany	Reitstadion	—N/a	—N/a
June 3, 1980	Bremen	West Germany	Stadthalle	—N/a	—N/a
June 4, 1980	Cologne	West Germany	Sporthalle	—N/a	—N/a
June 8, 1980	Kaiserslautern	West Germany	Betzenbergstadion	—N/a	—N/a
June 9, 1980	Zürich	Switzerland	Hallenstadion	—N/a	—N/a
June 12, 1980	Brussels	Belgium	Vorst Nationaal	—N/a	—N/a
June 13, 1980	Rotterdam	Netherlands	Rotterdam Ahoy Sportpaleis	—N/a	—N/a
June 14, 1980	Paris	France	Palais des Sports de Paris	—N/a	—N/a
June 16, 1980	Stafford	England	Bingley Hall	—N/a	—N/a
June 17, 1980	Stafford	England	Bingley Hall	—N/a	—N/a
June 20, 1980	London	England	Wembley Arena	—N/a	—N/a
June 21, 1980	London	England	Wembley Arena	—N/a	—N/a
June 22, 1980	London	England	Wembley Arena	—N/a	—N/a
June 25, 1980	London	England	Wembley Arena	—N/a	—N/a
June 26, 1980	London	England	Wembley Arena	—N/a	—N/a
June 27, 1980	London	England	Wembley Arena	—N/a	—N/a
North America
August 5, 1980	Lakeland	United States	Lakeland Civic Center	10,000 / 10,000	$120,000
August 6, 1980	Pembroke Pines	United States	Hollywood Sportatorium	—N/a	—N/a
August 8, 1980	Atlanta	United States	Omni Coliseum	13,764 / 17,000	$188,631
August 11, 1980	Mobile	United States	Municipal Auditorium	—N/a	—N/a
August 12, 1980	Birmingham	United States	BJCC Coliseum	—N/a	—N/a
August 13, 1980	Baton Rouge	United States	Riverside Centroplex	—N/a	—N/a
August 16, 1980	Dallas	United States	Reunion Arena	16,713 / 18,000	$208,912
August 17, 1980	San Antonio	United States	HemisFair Arena	10,309 / 15,000	$128,862
August 18, 1980	Houston	United States	The Summit	13,684 / 16,000	$174,574
August 21, 1980	Omaha	United States	Omaha Civic Auditorium	11,729 / 11,729	$140,478
August 22, 1980	Oklahoma City	United States	The Myriad	12,976 / 15,000	$162,200
August 23, 1980	Valley Center	United States	Kansas Coliseum	12,000 / 12,000	$146,400
August 24, 1980	Kansas City	United States	Kemper Arena	14,055 / 18,000	$175,687
August 27, 1980	Las Cruces	United States	Pan American Center	10,879 / 10,879	$114,583
August 28, 1980	Tucson	United States	McKale Center	11,400 / 11,400	$140,372
August 29, 1980	Phoenix	United States	Compton Terrace	—N/a	—N/a
August 31, 1980	Los Angeles	United States	Hollywood Bowl	—N/a	—N/a
September 1, 1980	Los Angeles	United States	Hollywood Bowl	—N/a	—N/a

== Personnel ==
- Mick Fleetwood – drums, cowbell, congas, gong, wind chimes, talking drum
- John McVie – bass guitar
- Christine McVie – Hammond organ, Yamaha CP-30, piano, accordion, acoustic guitar, maracas, vocals
- Lindsey Buckingham – lead guitar, acoustic guitar, vocals
- Stevie Nicks – vocals, tambourine, cowbell

Additional musicians

- Ray Lindsey – rhythm guitar on "Go Your Own Way" & "Second Hand News"
- Jeffery Bova – keyboards on "Tusk"
- Tony Todaro – percussion
