= Oh Daddy =

Oh Daddy may refer to:

- "Oh Daddy" (Fleetwood Mac song), a 1977 song by Fleetwood Mac from the album Rumours
- "Oh Daddy", a 1989 song by Adrian Belew from the album Mr. Music Head
- Oh, Daddy!, a 1935 film directed by Graham Cutts and Austin Melford
