= Rumours Tour =

1977–78 concert tour by Fleetwood Mac

- Tour by Fleetwood Mac
- Poster to the concerts in New York City
- Associated album: Rumours
- Start date: February 24, 1977
- End date: August 30, 1978
- Legs: 5
- No. of shows: 96

Fleetwood Mac concert chronology
- Fleetwood Mac Tour (1975–76); Rumours Tour (1977–78); Tusk Tour (1979–80)

The Rumours Tour was a concert tour by Fleetwood Mac that began after the release of the band's eleventh album with the same title in February 1977. During the tour, the band performed in North America, Europe, their native UK, continental Europe, Japan and Oceania. Their setlists primarily consisted of songs from their two most recent albums.

== Background ==
In the spring of 1976, Mick Fleetwood and John McVie set up their own management company called Seedy Management, which also included the Penguin Promotions subsidiary, which was tasked with handling the band's touring arrangements. Following a set of rehearsals in early February, the band embarked on their tour in the end of February, with their first series of performances occurring in the United States, where they frequently played to audiences of between ten and fifteen thousand people. The setlist primarily focused on material from the band's 1975 self-titled album and Rumours. Some early setlists from the band's first North American leg from February to March consisted of songs preceding the tenure of Stevie Nicks and Lindsey Buckingham including "Station Man" and "Hypnotized". By the month of May, when the band began travelled to Europe for their next leg of the tour, these two songs were dropped from the setlist and replaced with more songs from their two most recent albums. Nicks remembered that their show in Kansas City was not warmly received in part due to the heavy emphasis on songs from the Rumours album. She said that they "bombed" that performance because of the audience's lack of familiarity with the material at the time.

Following their European tour, which saw the band perform in the UK, Germany, Austria, and France, the band returned to the United States for some additional performances. A leg in Oceania followed, which saw the band perform a sold out show in Auckland, New Zealand. Prior to the band's departure to New Zealand, Nicks and Fleetwood began a romantic affair, which started during a break from touring while the band was in Los Angeles. During this time, the two of them withheld information about their relationship from the rest of the band. In between gigs, Fleetwood and Nicks secretly went on excursions together, which began in New Zealand and continued through December, where the band concluded the tour in Hawaii after playing a series of shows in Japan earlier that month. After the conclusion of the tour, Fleetwood informed Buckingham of his romantic relationship with Nicks.

Taking a break from the recording sessions for their follow-up album Tusk, the band went back on the road in the summer of 1978, playing arenas and stadiums in the United States. This leg of the tour was called "The Penguin Summer Country Safari". Whereas the band relied on station wagons for transport on their Fleetwood Mac Tour, they instead used private jets and limousines when travelling to venues.

== Setlist ==
First North American leg
1. "Say You Love Me"
2. "Station Man"
3. "Believe Me"
4. "The Chain"
5. "Dreams"
6. "Rhiannon"
7. "Why"
8. "Never Going Back Again"
9. "Landslide"
10. "Oh Daddy"
11. "Gold Dust Woman"
12. "Over My Head"
13. "You Make Loving Fun"
14. "I'm So Afraid"
15. "Go Your Own Way"
16. "World Turning"
17. "Hypnotized"
European leg
1. "Don't Stop"
2. "The Chain"
3. "Monday Morning"
4. "Dreams"
5. "Rhiannon"
6. "Why"
7. "Landslide"
8. "Never Going Back Again"
9. "Over My Head"
10. "Gold Dust Woman"
11. "Oh Well"
12. "Silver Springs
13. "You Make Loving Fun"
14. "I'm So Afraid"
15. "Say You Love Me"
16. "World Turning"
17. "Go Your Own Way"
18. "Songbird"
Second North American leg
1. "Say You Love Me"
2. "Monday Morning"
3. "Dreams"
4. "Oh Well"
5. "Rhiannon"
6. "Oh Daddy"
7. "Never Going Back Again"
8. "Landslide"
9. "Over My Head"
10. "Gold Dust Woman"
11. "You Make Loving Fun"
12. "I'm So Afraid"
13. "Go Your Own Way"
14. "World Turning"
15. "Blue Letter"
16. "Second Hand News"
17. "The Chain"
18. "Songbird"
The Penguin Summer Country Safari
1. "Monday Morning"
2. "Dreams"
3. "Oh Well"
4. "The Chain"
5. "Rhiannon"
6. "Oh Daddy"
7. "Say You Love Me"
8. "Never Going Back Again"
9. "Landslide"
10. "Gold Dust Woman"
11. "You Make Loving Fun"
12. "I'm So Afraid"
13. "World Turning"
14. "Go Your Own Way"
15. "Blue Letter"
16. "Sisters of the Moon"
17. "Songbird"

== Tour dates ==
Date	City	Country	Venue
North America, leg 1
February 24, 1977	Uniondale	United States	Nassau Veterans Memorial Coliseum
February 28, 1977	Berkeley	United States	Berkeley Community Theatre
March 4, 1977	Albuquerque	United States	University Arena
March 6, 1977	Fort Worth	United States	Tarrant County Convention Center
March 7, 1977	Houston	United States	The Summit
March 10, 1977	San Diego	United States	San Diego Sports Arena
March 19, 1977	Greensboro	United States	Greensboro Coliseum
March 21, 1977	Philadelphia	United States	Spectrum
March 22, 1977	Hershey	United States	Hersheypark Stadium
March 23, 1977	Hartford	United States	Hartford Civic Center
March 24, 1977	Uniondale	United States	Nassau Veterans Memorial Coliseum
March 25, 1977	Hartford	United States	Hartford Civic Center
March 27, 1977	Annapolis	United States	US Naval Academy
March 29, 1977	San Diego	United States	San Diego Sports Arena
April 1, 1977	Kansas City	United States	Kemper Arena
Europe
April 2, 1977	Birmingham	England	Birmingham Odeon
April 4, 1977	Glasgow	Scotland	Apollo Theatre
April 5, 1977	Manchester	England	Manchester Apollo
April 8, 1977	London	England	Rainbow Theatre
April 9, 1977	London	England	Rainbow Theatre
April 10, 1977	London	England	Rainbow Theatre
April 11, 1977	Bristol	England	Colston Hall
April 12, 1977	Paris	France	Pavillon de Paris
April 13, 1977	Amsterdam	Netherlands	Jaap Edenhal
April 14, 1977	Munich	West Germany	Circus Krone
April 15, 1977	Frankfurt	West Germany	Jahrhunderthalle
April 16, 1977	Amsterdam	Netherlands	Amsterdam RAI Exhibition and Convention Centre
April 19, 1977	Düsseldorf	West Germany	Phillipshalle
April 24, 1977	Stockholm	Sweden	Johanneshovs Isstadion
April 26, 1977	Lund	Sweden	Olympen
North America, leg 2
April 29, 1977	Salt Lake City	United States	U. of Utah Special Events Center (now Jon M. Huntsman Center)
May 1, 1977	Boulder	United States	Folsom Field
May 7, 1977 (Note: The concert on May 7, 1977 was a part of Day on the Green.)	Oakland	United States	Oakland–Alameda County Coliseum
May 8, 1977	Santa Barbara	United States	UCSB Campus Stadium
May 11, 1977	El Paso	United States	El Paso County Coliseum
May 15, 1977	Fort Worth	United States	Fort Worth Convention Center
May 16, 1977	Houston	United States	The Summit
May 18, 1977	Oklahoma City	United States	Oklahoma State Fair Arena
May 21, 1977	Nashville	United States	Nashville Municipal Auditorium
May 24, 1977	Columbia	United States	Carolina Coliseum
May 28, 1977	Miami	United States	Miami Stadium
May 29, 1977	Orlando	United States	Tangerine Bowl
June 1, 1977	Atlanta	United States	Omni Coliseum
June 2, 1977	Birmingham	United States	Jefferson Civic Center
June 3, 1977	Memphis	United States	Mid-South Coliseum
June 5, 1977	New Orleans	United States	Tad Gormley Stadium
June 24, 1977	Charlotte	United States	Charlotte Coliseum
June 25, 1977	Little Rock	United States	Barton Coliseum
June 28, 1977	Syracuse	United States	Oncenter War Memorial Arena
June 29, 1977	New York City	United States	Madison Square Garden
June 30, 1977	New York City	United States	Madison Square Garden
July 2, 1977	Buffalo	United States	Buffalo Memorial Auditorium
July 4, 1977	Toronto	Canada	CNE Grandstand
July 5, 1977	Greater Sudbury	Canada	Sudbury Community Arena
July 7, 1977	Providence	United States	Providence Civic Center
July 11, 1977	Norfolk	United States	Norfolk Scope
July 12, 1977	Landover	United States	Capital Centre
July 13, 1977	Landover	United States	Capital Centre
July 16, 1977	Lexington	United States	Rupp Arena
July 23, 1977	Chicago	United States	Chicago Stadium
July 24, 1977	Chicago	United States	Chicago Stadium
August 15, 1977	Clarkston	United States	Pine Knob Music Theatre
August 24, 1977	Las Vegas	United States	Aladdin Theatre
August 25, 1977	Las Vegas	United States	Aladdin Theatre
August 27, 1977	Tucson	United States	University of Arizona
August 29, 1977	Inglewood	United States	The Forum
August 30, 1977	Inglewood	United States	The Forum
August 31, 1977	Inglewood	United States	The Forum
September 3, 1977	Seattle	United States	Seattle Center Coliseum
September 4, 1977	Portland	United States	Veterans Memorial Coliseum
September 5, 1977	Vancouver	Canada	Pacific Coliseum
September 7, 1977	Edmonton	Canada	Northlands Coliseum
September 8, 1977	Calgary	Canada	Stampede Grandstand
September 11, 1977	Milwaukee	United States	Milwaukee County Stadium
September 12, 1977	Saint Paul	United States	Saint Paul Civic Center
September 15, 1977	Lincoln	United States	Bob Devaney Sports Center
September 16, 1977	Kansas City	United States	Kemper Arena
September 17, 1977	St. Louis	United States	Kiel Auditorium
September 20, 1977	Indianapolis	United States	Market Square Arena
September 21, 1977	Louisville	United States	Freedom Hall
September 22, 1977	Detroit	United States	Cobo Arena
September 25, 1977	Richfield	United States	Richfield Coliseum
September 26, 1977	Richfield	United States	Richfield Coliseum
September 27, 1977	Philadelphia	United States	Spectrum
October 2, 1977	Santa Barbara	United States	UC Santa Barbara Events Center
October 3, 1977	San Diego	United States	San Diego Sports Arena
October 4, 1977	San Diego	United States	San Diego Sports Arena
Oceania
November 6, 1977	Auckland	New Zealand	Western Springs Stadium
November 9, 1977	Gold Coast	Australia	Gold Coast Parklands
November 11, 1977	Sydney	Australia	Sydney Showground
November 13, 1977	Melbourne	Australia	Calder Park Raceway
November 15, 1977	Brisbane	Australia	Lang Park
November 17, 1977	Sydney	Australia	Sydney Showground
November 18, 1977	Perth	Australia	Perth Entertainment Centre
November 19, 1977	Perth	Australia	Perth Entertainment Centre
November 23, 1977	Adelaide	Australia	Memorial Drive Park
Japan
December 1, 1977	Nagoya	Japan	Nagoya Civic Assembly Hall
December 3, 1977	Osaka	Japan	Osaka Festival Hall
December 4, 1977	Osaka	Japan	Osaka Festival Hall
December 5, 1977	Tokyo	Japan	Nippon Budokan
North America, leg 3
December 7, 1977	Honolulu, Hawaii	United States	Neil Blaisdell Center
December 10, 1977	Lahaina, Hawaii	United States	Royal Lahaina Tennis Stadium
The Penguin Country Summer Safari
July 17, 1978	East Troy	United States	Alpine Valley Music Theatre
July 18, 1978	East Troy	United States	Alpine Valley Music Theatre
July 19, 1978	East Troy	United States	Alpine Valley Music Theatre
July 21, 1978	Boulder	United States	Folsom Field
July 22, 1978	Austin	United States	Texas Memorial Stadium
July 23, 1978	Dallas	United States	Cotton Bowl
July 26, 1978	Saratoga Springs	United States	Saratoga Performing Arts Center
July 28, 1978	Orchard Park	United States	Rich Stadium
July 29, 1978	Philadelphia	United States	John F. Kennedy Stadium
July 30, 1978	Philadelphia	United States	John F. Kennedy Stadium
August 6, 1978	Landover	United States	Capital Centre
August 7, 1978	Landover	United States	Capital Centre
August 24, 1978	Lexington	United States	Rupp Arena
August 26, 1978	Cleveland	United States	Cleveland Stadium
August 28, 1978	Birmingham	United States	Birmingham-Jefferson Civic Center
August 29, 1978	Atlanta	United States	Omni Coliseum
August 30, 1978	Baton Rouge	United States	Tiger Stadium

=== Box office score data ===
List of box office score data with date, city, venue, attendance, gross
Date	City	Venue	Attendance	Gross
March 10, 1977	San Diego, United States	San Diego Sports Arena	11,810 / 11,810	$89,613
March 19, 1977	Greensboro, United States	Greensboro Coliseum	15,821 / 15,821	$111,367
March 21, 1977	Philadelphia, United States	Spectrum	17,380 / 17,380	$126,971
March 25, 1977	Hartford, United States	Hartford Civic Center	10,409 / 10,409	$77,102
May 1, 1977	Boulder, United States	Folsom Field	61,500 / 61,500	$481,166
May 7, 1977	Oakland, United States	Oakland–Alameda County Coliseum	57,500 / 57,500	$575,000
May 21, 1977	Nashville, United States	Nashville Municipal Auditorium	11,000 / 11,000	$82,500
June 1, 1977	Atlanta, United States	Omni Coliseum	14,851 / 14,851	$116,340
June 2, 1977	Birmingham, United States	Jefferson Civic Center	17,815 / 17,815	$123,710
June 3, 1977	Memphis, United States	Mid-South Coliseum	11,222 / 11,222	$81,852
June 29, 1977	New York City, United States	Madison Square Garden	35,440 / 35,440	$287,270
June 30, 1977	New York City, United States	Madison Square Garden	35,440 / 35,440	$287,270
July 7, 1977	Providence, United States	Providence Civic Center	11,282	$101,767
July 16, 1977	Lexington, United States	Rupp Arena	20,422 / 20,422	$157,001
August 29, 1977	Inglewood, United States	The Forum	47,499 / 47,499	$433,853
August 30, 1977	Inglewood, United States	The Forum	47,499 / 47,499	$433,853
August 31, 1977	Inglewood, United States	The Forum	47,499 / 47,499	$433,853
September 3, 1977	Seattle, United States	Seattle Center Coliseum	15,000 / 15,000	$112,500
September 11, 1977	Milwaukee, United States	Milwaukee County Stadium	48,000	$433,958
September 16, 1977	Kansas City, United States	Kemper Arena	13,477 / 13,477	$112,936
September 17, 1977	St. Louis, United States	Kiel Auditorium	10,586 / 10,586	$85,095
September 20, 1977	Indianapolis, United States	Market Square Arena	17,500 / 17,500	$130,125
September 21, 1977	Louisville, United States	Freedom Hall	17,845 / 17,845	$133,455
September 27, 1977	Philadelphia, United States	Spectrum	19,500 / 19,500	$156,000
October 3, 1977	San Diego, United States	San Diego Sports Arena	26,156 / 26,156	$232,614
October 4, 1977	San Diego, United States	San Diego Sports Arena	26,156 / 26,156	$232,614
July 17, 1978	East Troy, United States	Alpine Valley Music Theatre	54,639 / 54,639	$503,754
July 18, 1978	East Troy, United States	Alpine Valley Music Theatre	54,639 / 54,639	$503,754
July 19, 1978	East Troy, United States	Alpine Valley Music Theatre	54,639 / 54,639	$503,754
August 24, 1978	Lexington, United States	Rupp Arena	17,424	$148,104
TOTAL			584,078	$4,894,053

== Personnel ==
- Mick Fleetwood – drums, cowbell, congas, wind chimes, gong, talking drum
- John McVie – bass guitars
- Christine McVie – Hammond B3 organ, Hohner Pianet, Fender Rhodes, piano, maracas, vocals
- Lindsey Buckingham – acoustic and electric guitars, vocals
- Stevie Nicks – vocals, tambourine, cowbell

Additional musicians

- Ray Lindsey – rhythm guitar on "Go Your Own Way", and "Second Hand News"
