= I Don't Want to Know =

- Japan single cover

Song by Fleetwood Mac

from the album Rumours
- Released: 1977
- Recorded: 1976
- Studio: Wally Heider Studios
- Genre: Pop rock
- Length: 3:11
- Label: Warner Bros.
- Songwriter: Stevie Nicks
- Producers: Fleetwood Mac, Richard Dashut, Ken Caillat

"I Don't Want to Know" is a song written by Stevie Nicks which was first released by the British-American rock band Fleetwood Mac on their 1977 album Rumours. It was added to the track list of Rumours to replace "Silver Springs", a Nicks composition that was cut from Rumours due to its length and tempo.

== Background ==
Stevie Nicks wrote "I Don't Want to Know" much earlier than the Rumours sessions, when she and Lindsey Buckingham were performing as the duo Buckingham Nicks, prior to joining Fleetwood Mac. The other band members of Fleetwood Mac decided to use the song as a replacement for a song Nicks had written for Rumours, "Silver Springs," when they found that "Silver Springs" would not fit on the album. The other four band members made a recording of the song without Nicks late in the Rumours recording sessions. Buckingham sang Nicks' lead vocal and the harmonies for this initial take, having known the song from their Buckingham Nicks days.

Drummer Mick Fleetwood broke the news to Nicks that they decided that they needed to replace "Silver Springs" with "I Don't Want to Know" and wanted her to re-record her vocal part over the one Buckingham recorded for the song. At first, Nicks was angry and did not want to cooperate with the recording, but ultimately she relented, unhappy with the prospect of only having two songwriting credits on the album.

Nicks later remarked that if "Silver Springs" had to be replaced, she was glad that "I Don't Want to Know" was used, since she likes the recording, noting The Everly Brothers-like harmonies in her vocals with Buckingham.

In 1978, the song was also released as a single in Japan with "Oh Daddy".

== Lyrics and music ==
"I Don't Want to Know" has a country music flavor. It is an uptempo song, which recording engineer Ken Caillat describes as "3:16 of high impact energy." Fleetwood Mac biographer Cath Carroll describes the opening of the song as being "unprepossessing" and "almost lumpen." However, she claims this has a purpose, as it makes it even more powerful and energetic when the main part of the song kicks in.

The lyrics provide a conciliatory view of the end of a romantic relationship. Although the song was written long before the breakup of Nicks and Buckingham, "I Don't Want to Know" fits the pattern of the songs on Rumours where Nicks' songs, such as "Dreams" provided a conciliatory perspective and Buckingham's songs, such as "Go Your Own Way" and "Second Hand News," were more bitter.

One of the lines of the song seems to be in answer to a line in a song Buckingham wrote for the previous self-titled Fleetwood Mac album. On "Monday Morning", Buckingham sang the lines

I got nothing but love for you
So tell me what you really wanna do
First you love me then you get on down the line.

In "I Don't Want to Know" Nicks picks up the "get on down the line" motif with the lines:

I don't want to know the reasons why
Love keeps right on walking on down the line.

== Reception ==
Rolling Stone critic John Swenson described "I Don't Want to Know" as "pure post-Buffalo Springfield country-rock formula." Fleetwood Mac biographer, Carroll, attributes its strength to the vocal harmonies between Nicks and Buckingham and to Buckingham's "strong country-pop guitar solo." Stylus Magazine critic Patrick McKay regards "I Don't Want to Know" as one of the "strongest tracks" on Rumours. In his book Killing Yourself to Live: 85% of a True Story, Chuck Klosterman praised Buckingham's acoustic guitar playing in that the way you can hear the squeaking sound of his fingers sliding down the guitar strings made the opening of the song sound "organic and raw." Billboard placed "I Don't Want to Know" No. 7 on their list ranking the eleven original songs on Rumours, saying that the song possessed "a nervous energy" with "some antsy handclaps and a tempo that feels set about 10 bpm faster than it should." Music historian Joel Whitburn lists "I Don't Want to Know" as an essential song for downloading to an iPod. Author Joe S. Harrington regards Liz Phair's "Six Foot One" as a "musical [and] spiritual descendant" of "I Don't Want to Know."

== Other media ==
The Goo Goo Dolls covered "I Don't Want to Know" on Legacy: A Tribute to Fleetwood Mac's Rumours in 1998. According to AllMusic critic Stephen Thomas Erlewine, "the Goo Goo Dolls rock the song up". The song was used in a second-season episode of Glee titled "Rumours" and was performed by Cory Monteith (as Finn Hudson) and Dianna Agron (as Quinn Fabray). In 2013, the song was used in a Saturday Night Live sketch, "Diner Divorce". The divorcing couple's intense arguments would end whenever the song played.

== Personnel ==
- Stevie Nicks – vocals, hand claps
- Christine Mcvie – Wurlitzer electric piano
- Mick Fleetwood – drums, tambourine
- John McVie – bass guitar
- Lindsey Buckingham – 12 string and electric guitars, vocals

== Certifications ==
Region	Certification	Certified units/sales
United Kingdom (BPI)	Silver	200,000^{‡}
^{‡} Sales+streaming figures based on certification alone.
