= Before the Beginning: 1968–1970 Live & Demo Sessions =

Box set by Fleetwood Mac
- Released: 15 November 2019
- Recorded: 1968–1970
- Genre: Blues rock
- Length: 213:43
- Label: Sony

Fleetwood Mac chronology
50 Years – Don't Stop (2018)	Before the Beginning: 1968–1970 Live & Demo Sessions (2019)	Rumours Live (2023)

Before the Beginning: 1968–1970 Live & Demo Sessions is a boxed set by the British-American blues rock band Fleetwood Mac, released on 15 November 2019 by Sony Music. Initially intended for release on 7 June 2019, The album was finally released on 15 November 2019.

== Contents ==
Before the Beginning: 1968–1970 Live & Demo Sessions is a 3xCD (3xLP, but shorter) compilation of demos and live performances recorded spanning from 1968 to 1970, this album's music was recorded with the early incarnation of the band, and was therefore recorded before Christine McVie (then Christine Perfect) joined the band. The liner notes of the set states the tracks are "undated, unlabeled, and recorded who knows where."

== Critical reception ==
Professional ratings
Review scores
Source	Rating
AllMusic	3.5/5 stars
Record Collector	3/4 stars

Writing for AllMusic, Thom Jurek stated that "when paired with the music, the argument can easily be made for completists, though this collection should also appeal to any serious blues fan."

In a Record Collector review, Terry Staunton said that it was "a joy to hear the lean and hungry enthusiasm of Mac’s rough edges, an earthiness that paradoxically makes an even greater impression after the digital polish the source tape has gone through". He also felt that the "youthful vitality of the playing illustrates a charming democracy, and tangible evidence that the group was much more than just a vehicle for Green’s burgeoning genius", concluding that "Nevertheless, the intermittent hiss and occasional feedback of the master tapes means Before The Beginning retains the air of a sneakily captured bootleg, as opposed to a collection specifically intended for mass consumption beyond the immediacy and thrill to be had from witnessing the performances in person."

== Track listing ==
All tracks on all discs are live recordings, except where noted.

Disc 1
No.	Title	Writer(s)	Length
1.	"Madison Blues" (version 1)	Elmore James	4:34
2.	"Something Inside of Me"	James; Marshall Sehorn	5:44
3.	"The Woman That I Love"	Joe Bihari; B. B. King	4:51
4.	"Worried Dream"	King	9:50
5.	"Dust My Blues"	James; Robert Johnson	4:31
6.	"Got to Move"	James; Sehorn	2:53
7.	"Trying So Hard to Forget"	Peter Green	4:30
8.	"Instrumental"	Green	9:36
9.	"Have You Ever Loved a Woman"	Billy Myles	7:50
10.	"Lazy Poker Blues"	Green	4:27
11.	"Stop Messin' Round"	Green	1:09
12.	"I Loved Another Woman"	Green	5:26
13.	"I Believe My Time Ain't Long" (version 1)	Johnson	5:05
14.	"Sun Is Shining"	James	4:50

Disc 2
No.	Title	Writer(s)	Length
1.	"Long Tall Sally"	Enotris Johnson; Robert Blackwell; Richard Penniman	4:22
2.	"Willie and the Hand Jive"	Johnny Otis	4:12
3.	"I Need Your Love So Bad"	William Edward John; Mertis John Jr.	1:30
4.	"I Believe My Time Ain't Long" (version 2)	Johnson	4:47
5.	"Shake Your Money Maker"	James	8:44
6.	"Before the Beginning"	Green	3:37
7.	"Only You"	Danny Kirwan	4:19
8.	"Madison Blues" (version 2)	James	3:21
9.	"Can't Stop Lovin'"	James	3:37
10.	"The Green Manalishi (With the Two Prong Crown)"	Green	12:00
11.	"Albatross"	Green	3:43
12.	"World in Harmony" (version 1)	Green; Kirwan	3:40
13.	"Sandy Mary"	Green	5:11
14.	"Only You"	KIrwan	4:02
15.	"World In Harmony" (version 2)	Green; KIrwan	3:33

Disc 3
No.	Title	Writer(s)	Length
1.	"I Can't Hold Out"	James	7:25
2.	"Oh Well" (Part 1)	Green	2:50
3.	"Rattlesnake Shake"	Green	13:05
4.	"Underway"	Green	7:33
5.	"Coming Your Way"	Kirwan	11:37
6.	"Homework"	Dave Clark; Albert Perkins; Otis Rush	3:20
7.	"My Baby's Sweet"	James Williamson	3:52
8.	"My Baby's Gone"	James	3:25
9.	"You Need Love" (demo)	Dixon	4:48
10.	"Talk With You" (demo)	Kirwan	4:12
11.	"If It Ain't Me" (GK edit, demo)	Jimmy Rogers	2:32
12.	"Mean Old World" (demo)	T-Bone Walker	3:14
Total length:			213:43

== Charts ==
Weekly chart performance for Before the Beginning: 1968–1970 Live & Demo Sessions
Chart (2019)	Peak position
UK Official Albums Sales Chart (OCC)	98
UK Official Record Store Chart (OCC)	31
