= Gold Dust Woman =

1977 song by Fleetwood Mac

Song by Fleetwood Mac

from the album Rumours
- A-side: "You Make Loving Fun" (US), "Don't Stop" (UK)
- Released: 1977
- Recorded: 1976
- Genre: Rock
- Length: 4:51
- Label: Warner Bros.
- Songwriter: Stevie Nicks
- Producers: Fleetwood Mac, Richard Dashut, Ken Caillat

Audio
- "Gold Dust Woman" on YouTube

"Gold Dust Woman" is a song by British-American rock band Fleetwood Mac from their eleventh studio album, Rumours (1977). Written and sung by Stevie Nicks, the song was released as a B-side to "Don't Stop" in the United Kingdom and "You Make Loving Fun" in the United States.

The 2004 two-disc special edition release of Rumours includes two demos of "Gold Dust Woman". One demo features a vocal melody and lyrics in the coda which would later be developed into Nicks' solo single "If You Ever Did Believe", which became the theme song for the film Practical Magic.

== Recording ==
"Gold Dust Woman" originally started as a folk song, but Nicks sought a darker arrangement as production on the song progressed during the Rumours recording sessions in February 1976. Nicks presented the song to bandmate Lindsey Buckingham on an acoustic guitar and remarked that the band began recording the song two days later. Ken Caillat, who produced Rumours, remarked that the song "evolved slowly" and that "the basic track was very simple, kind of like a folk song. Stevie wanted it to grow. It just kind of snuck up on you. The next thing I knew it was getting kind of creepy." In its original demo form, the song was nearly eight minutes long and consisted of a few alternating piano chords and vocals. It was the third song the band worked on for the Rumours album.

For basic tracking, Mick Fleetwood was on drums, John McVie played his recently acquired Alembic bass guitar, Lindsey Buckingham used a Fender Stratocaster electric guitar, Christine McVie played a Rhodes piano, and Stevie Nicks laid down a rough vocal. For a couple of early takes, Nicks played the piano instead, although she moved exclusively to vocals once Christine McVie was more familiar with the song's structure. They recorded eight takes, but none of them were satisfactory.

On February 14, the band resumed work on "Gold Dust Woman" and recorded another seven takes, with the fourth being deemed the best. During this batch of takes, Fleetwood mounted a cowbell on his drum kit, replacing the hi-hat. Several months later, while the rest of the band was away on vacation, Buckingham overdubbed some parts on a Dobro guitar. Caillat placed masking tape near the guitar's sound hole and used ECM-50 and AKG C-451 microphones to record the instrument. He then boosted the upper-mid frequencies and attenuated the lower frequencies so that the instrument would cut through the mix.

The take chosen for release on Rumours was reportedly recorded at 4 a.m., after a long night of attempts in the studio. Just before and during the final take, Stevie Nicks had wrapped her head with a black scarf, veiling her senses to tap memories and emotions. Many unusual instruments were used in the recording, including an electric harpsichord with a phaser. The keys of the harpsichord were marked with tape so Fleetwood could play the right notes. To accentuate Nicks's vocals, Fleetwood broke sheets of glass. According to Caillat, "He was wearing goggles and coveralls — it was pretty funny. He just went mad, bashing glass with this big hammer. He tried to do it on cue, but it was difficult. Eventually, we said, 'Just break the glass,' and we fit it all in."

== Critical reception ==
Slant Magazine critic Barry Walsh described the song as finding Nicks "at her folky (not flaky) best with one of her most poignant character studies". Matthew Greenwald of AllMusic thought that "Gold Dust Woman" was a "true autobiographical song for Stevie Nicks" that "foreshadowed her substance abuse problems in a poetic and somewhat biting manner." Billboard highlighted the song's "desert-like production" and felt that it was "as alluring and enigmatic as its singer — a note of anti-closure for the LP to end on." The Guardian and Paste ranked the song number 16 and number 12 respectively on their lists of the 30 greatest Fleetwood Mac songs. Rolling Stone ranked the song eighth on its list of the 50 greatest Fleetwood Mac songs, deeming it a "seductive guitar ballad that doubles as a horror show."

== Interpretations ==
In a 1976 interview with Crawdaddy magazine, Nicks said that the song was about "groupie-type ladies" who would give her and Christine McVie "dirty looks" but change their disposition when around men. When asked about the song in an interview with Courtney Love for Spin in October 1997, Nicks said that "gold dust" was a metaphor for cocaine:

Everybody was doing a little bit. We never bought it or anything, it was just around—and I think I had a real serious flash of what this stuff could be, of what it could do to you ... 'Gold Dust Woman' was about how we all love the ritual of it, the little bottle, the diamond-studded spoons, the fabulous velvet bags. For me, it fitted right into the incense and candles and that stuff. And I really imagined that it could overtake everything, never thinking in a million years that it would overtake me.

The "rulers make bad lovers" lyric related to the influx of wealth that Nicks accumulated due to the newfound commercial success of Fleetwood Mac and her contemplation on how this would affect her romantic life. Nicks said that dragon and the black widow referenced in the song symbolized anger. Buckingham commented that "Gold Dust Woman" was "an evil song, very dark, and I'm guessing that the acrimony was directed at me." In an interview for VH1's Classic Albums, Nicks offered further insight into the song's meaning:

"Gold Dust Woman" was my kind of symbolic look at somebody going through a bad relationship, doing a lot of drugs, and trying to make it. Trying to live. Trying to get through it.

== Live performances ==
"Gold Dust Woman" has been performed live on several occasions both by Fleetwood Mac and Nicks as a solo artist. The song was first performed during the band's Rumours Tour, with a live recording from a concert at The Fabulous Forum from 29 August 1977 later appearing on both the 2021 deluxe edition of Fleetwood Mac's Live album and their Rumours Live album in 2023. The song was also performed on the band's 1997 tour promoting The Dance. For tours later in the band's career including their On With the Show Tour, Nicks incorporated a routine that she dubbed the "Crackhead Dance", which she described as channelling "some of the drug addicts I knew, and probably being myself too — just being that girl lost on the streets, freaked out with no idea how to find her way." Nicks commented that Buckingham approved of the dance as it provided him with an opportunity to improvise on the guitar.

== Personnel ==
- Stevie Nicks – lead vocals
- Lindsey Buckingham – guitars, Dobro, backing vocals
- Mick Fleetwood – drums, cowbell, electric harpsichord, sound effects
- Christine McVie – Rhodes piano, backing vocals
- John McVie – bass guitar

== Certifications ==
Region	Certification	Certified units/sales
United Kingdom (BPI)	Gold	400,000^{‡}
^{‡} Sales+streaming figures based on certification alone.

== Cover versions ==
A cover version by the American alternative rock band Hole was released on 11 June 1996 as their ninth CD single. It was also featured on the soundtrack to The Crow: City of Angels where it played during the ending credits of the film. This version was produced by Ric Ocasek of the Cars.

=== Charts ===
Chart (1996)	Peak position
Australia (ARIA)	87
US Billboard Modern Rock Tracks	31
