= Go Your Own Way =

1976 single by Fleetwood Mac

Single by Fleetwood Mac

from the album Rumours
- B-side: "Silver Springs"
- Released: 20 December 1976
- Recorded: 1976
- Studio: Record Plant (Sausalito); Wally Heider's Studio 3 (Hollywood); Criteria (Miami)
- Genre: Rock; power pop
- Length: 3:43
- Label: Warner Bros.
- Songwriter: Lindsey Buckingham
- Producers: Fleetwood Mac; Richard Dashut; Ken Caillat

Fleetwood Mac singles chronology
"Say You Love Me" (1976)	"Go Your Own Way" (1976)	"Dreams" (1977)

Audio sample
- file; help

Music video
- "Fleetwood Mac - Go Your Own Way (Official Music Video) [HD Remaster]" on YouTube

"Go Your Own Way" is a song by the British-American rock band Fleetwood Mac from their eleventh studio album, Rumours (1977). The song was released as the album's lead single on 20 December 1976 in the United States and on 11 February 1977 in the United Kingdom. Written and sung by Lindsey Buckingham, it became the band's first top-ten hit in the United States. "Go Your Own Way" has been well received by music critics and was ranked number 120 by Rolling Stone magazine on their list of 500 greatest songs of all time in 2010, and re-ranked number 401 in 2021. They also ranked the song second on their list of the 50 greatest Fleetwood Mac songs.

Recorded in three separate studios, the track was developed over a period of four months. As with most tracks on the Rumours album, none of the instruments were recorded live together; the tracks were instead completed through a series of overdubs. Lyrically, "Go Your Own Way" is about Buckingham's breakup with his bandmate Stevie Nicks.

== Composition ==
"Go Your Own Way" was written at a house the band rented in Florida between legs of their Fleetwood Mac Tour and was the first song Buckingham presented to the band for the Rumours album. Mick Fleetwood, the band's drummer, remembered that the house had a "distinctly bad vibe to it, as if it were haunted, which did nothing to help matters". The lyrics at this stage had yet to be fleshed out, so Buckingham sang musical notes as placeholders in certain locations.

Buckingham wrote "Go Your Own Way" in what he described as "a stream of consciousness" that focused on his raw emotions. Ken Caillat, who produced Rumours, was unsure if the song had potential when Buckingham presented it to him. Buckingham had prepared a demo of "Go Your Own Way" on a cassette, which he played for Caillat and the rest of the band through room monitors in the control room. "Lindsey was beating his acoustic guitar as hard as he could and screaming his lungs out. The first time I heard it, I thought, What the heck is going on? It sounded so nonmusical. I didn’t know if anything would come from it."

Sheryl Crow, who would later work with Stevie Nicks, remarked: "When I was seventeen, I remember listening to 'Go Your Own Way' and feeling like that song was written for me."

== Recording ==
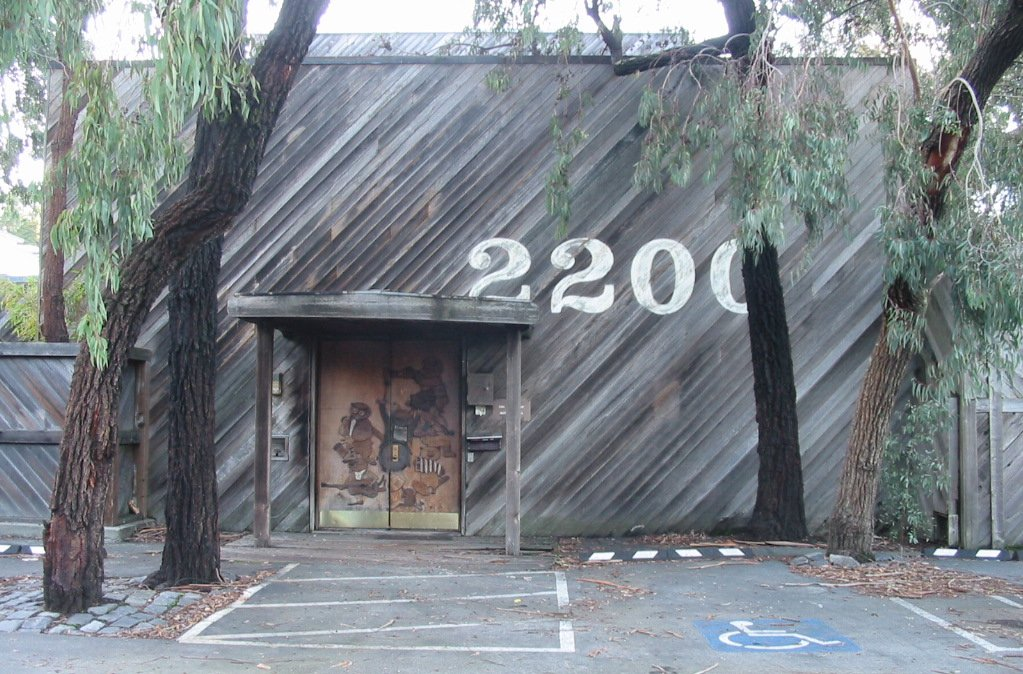
Like many other Rumours tracks, "Go Your Own Way" was partially recorded in Sausalito's Record Plant, a wooden structure with few windows, located at 2200 Bridgeway.

"Go Your Own Way" was the second song that Fleetwood Mac worked on for the Rumours album. To familiarize John McVie with the song structure, Buckingham guided McVie through the chord changes in the control room. Early tracking was done with Mick Fleetwood using an eight-inch Ludwig snare in his drum kit, John McVie on a Fender bass, Christine McVie on Hammond organ, Stevie Nicks on tambourine, and Lindsey Buckingham on a 1959 Fender Stratocaster. Buckingham played an electric guitar instead of an acoustic during these sessions so he could be in the same room as the rest of the band without worrying about audio leakage. None of Nicks' tambourine parts were used for the final recording.

Buckingham was inspired by the drum feel of "Street Fighting Man" by the Rolling Stones and sought to incorporate a variation of the groove in "Go Your Own Way". Caillat took notice of Buckingham's enthusiasm as he demonstrated the drum part to Fleetwood. "I remember watching him guide Mick (Fleetwood) as to what he wanted – he'd be so animated, like a little kid, playing these air tom fills with his curly hair flying. Mick wasn't so sure he could do what Lindsey wanted, but he did a great job, and the song took off." Fleetwood ultimately came up with his own variation of the "Street Fighting Man" groove by playing across the tom-toms and hitting the bass drum on the middle beat. To achieve an open drum sound, Caillat and Richard Dashut situated the drum kit next to plywood and hard backing walls; additional plywood was also placed on the ground. Fleetwood's drum kit was miked with AKG 451s for overheads and the snare drum, an M-88 Beyerdynamic microphone for the bass drum, and a Neumann U 87 for other components of the kit.

Initially, John McVie tracked a busier and bouncier bass part that gave the song "a country feel". To prevent the verses from becoming too bloated, Buckingham asked him to play straight eighth notes. Buckingham granted McVie more artistic liberty on the choruses, which he opened up with a more melodic bass line. Overdubs of Hammond B3 organ, electric and acoustic guitars, backing vocals, and assorted percussion such as the bell of a cymbal and maracas were also added to the mix. Buckingham wanted the electric rhythm guitars to sound like one instrument, so to fulfill that objective, he played a distorted guitar with little transience and layered it over a cleaner guitar. He believed that this recording technique created a thicker guitar sound that provided "a richer landscape to work with". The song follows a cyclic I-V-IV chord progression in the verses and a vi-IV-V chord progression in the chorus.

Buckingham had difficult time assembling a suitable guitar solo, so Caillat, who was away in Lake Tahoe for Christmas vacation, returned to Criteria Studios to finish the track. Caillat built the solo by piecing together six different lead guitar takes by pulling up and muting individual guitar solos through faders. He described the solo as "seamless" despite its fragmented nature. A Shure SM57 microphone was used to capture the guitar solo and some of the vocals.

In the final mix, the kick drum created a pumping effect together with the rhythm guitar from the dynamic range compression during the final portion of the song. Dashut, who served as a producer and engineer during these recording sessions, posited that they would not have encountered this "lucky mistake" had they mixed the song digitally.

== Lyrics ==
Like most tracks on Rumours, the lyrical content of "Go Your Own Way" documents personal strain in relationships between band members. Buckingham wrote "Go Your Own Way" as a response to his breakup with fellow Fleetwood Mac vocalist Stevie Nicks, with whom Buckingham had been in a romantic relationship. Buckingham noted that he struggled to maintain a professional working relationship with Nicks after she romantically severed ties with him. He likened the first line of the song, "Loving you isn't the right thing to do," to the start of a conversation with someone, adding that it was about "coming to terms with the fact that I may not be over this person."

Early versions of the song had an alternate chorus of "You can go your own way/You can roll like thunder" and also lacked the "packing up, shacking up" lyric that appeared on the final recording. When Nicks heard the line "packing up, shacking up is all you wanna do", she asked Buckingham to remove it from "Go Your Own Way", but he ultimately kept those lyrics. Nicks disputed that she "shacked up" with men while she was still in a relationship with him and said that he concocted that narrative to irritate her. "Every time those words would come onstage, I wanted to go over and kill him. He knew it, so he really pushed my buttons through that." Discussing the lyric, Buckingham commented that "it may be a rather truthful and blunt observation, but that’s the way you write songs." In a 2022 interview with The New Yorker, Nicks contrasted the lyrics on "Go Your Own Way" with those found on her composition "Dreams"; she called the two "counter songs" and said that they discussed their breakup through different perspectives.

== Release and initial response ==
Although the release date for Rumours was set for February 1977, Fleetwood Mac wanted a single out in the US by Christmas 1976 (although in the UK and other markets, the single was released in February 1977); "Go Your Own Way", which had just been mastered, was chosen to fulfill that role. This marketing move proved to be a boon to album sales: Pre-orders had reached 800,000 copies, which at the time was the largest advance sale in Warner Brothers' history.

B. Mitchel Reed, a Los Angeles radio DJ in the 1970s, was underwhelmed when he first played the single on his program, telling his listeners "I don't know about that one". Later that day, Buckingham contacted Reed, asking what his issues were with the song; Reed informed Buckingham that he had a difficult time finding beat one. Buckingham attributed the problem to the acoustic guitar track he added late into production. He maintained that the acoustic guitar was an essential component in gluing the composition together but also believed that its entrance created confusion over the location of beat one.

As soon as I came up with the acoustic part, the whole song came to life for me because it acted as a foil for the vocals and a rhythmic counterpoint...so when it comes in, you don't have a reference point for where the 'one' is, or where the beat is at all. It's only after the first chorus comes in that you can realize where you are – and that's what that deejay was confused about.

— Lindsey Buckingham

Fleetwood characterised his playing as "capitalizing on (his) own ineptness". Since then, Fleetwood has declared "Go Your Own Way" as one of his favorite songs to play, and praised Buckingham's contributions to the track. Jeff Porcaro, the drummer for Boz Scaggs, as well as a founding member of Toto, was particularly impressed with Fleetwood's drumming on "Go Your Own Way" during live performances. On nights when Boz Scaggs opened for Fleetwood Mac, Porcaro watched Fleetwood's drumming from the side of the stage. Intrigued by his playing, Porcaro approached Fleetwood after a live gig; Fleetwood explained to Porcaro that his dyslexia prevented him from understanding the minutiae of his drumming. Fleetwood said of that conversation, "It was only after we continued to talk that Jeff realized I wasn't kidding around. We eventually had a tremendous laugh about it."

== Commercial performance ==
Like their last three singles from the album Fleetwood Mac, "Go Your Own Way" charted in the US. The track made its first appearance on the Billboard Hot 100 chart dated January 8, 1977, where it entered at No. 71. Two weeks later, the single ascended into the top 40. On March 12, 1977, the song reached its peak of No. 10, a position it held for two weeks. The song spent a total of 11 weeks in the top 40. In Fred Bronson's Billboard's Hottest Hot 100 Hits, a book that lists the top 5000 most successful songs released between July 9, 1955, and February 3, 2007, in terms of chart performance, "Go Your Own Way" ranks 4201st.

In the UK, the single peaked at No. 38 with an initial chart run of four weeks. However, the song attained a lasting popularity in the UK, and it re-entered the singles chart as a digital download on several occasions, beginning in 2009, eventually accumulating ten additional weeks on the UK chart. In July 2026, the song was certified 6× platinum by the British Phonographic Industry (BPI), denoting sales and streams of over 3,600,000 units.

In New Zealand, the single debuted at No. 40 on March 13, 1977. Two weeks later, it entered the top 30. The song remained at No. 30 for two weeks on the chart dated April 10 and 17. By April 24, "Go Your Own Way" reached its peak of No. 23. "Go Your Own Way" exited the top 40 by May 29, but re-entered the following week at No. 38, extending its total chart duration to 11 weeks.

== Critical reception ==
Initial reviews for "Go Your Own Way" were mostly positive. In his review for Rumours, Alex Ward of The Washington Post deemed "Go Your Own Way" as "the best choice for a single on the record". John Swenson of Rolling Stone thought that Buckingham evoked the musical sensibilities of the Byrds with the acoustic guitar work, particularly on the chorus. He also said that Fleetwood's drumming added "a new dimension" to the song and served as an effective foil to John McVie's bass and Buckingham's acoustic guitar.

Billboard said that "Go Your Own Way" adhered more to the conventions of mainstream rock than any of the singles on their Fleetwood Mac album from 1975 and felt that the song resembled the work of Jefferson Starship. Writing for Phonograph Record, Bud Scoppa characterised the song as a "pathos-laden scorcher". Stephen Demorest of Creem magazine highlighted the song's "distinctive staggered rhythm and slicing guitar lines" and called it a superior track to "I'm So Afraid", a Buckingham composition from Fleetwood Mac's 1975 self-titled album.

"Go Your Own Way" has achieved critical acclaim in retrospective reviews. Noting the song's resurgence in popularity with millennials, James Lachno marvelled at the song's appeal with younger people, especially when juxtaposed with its alternative contemporaries. "Recently, 'Go Your Own Way' and 'The Chain' – better known as the BBC's Formula One theme tune – have become 2am favourites for bleary-eyed twentysomethings desperate to keep a house party going. By contrast, pioneering punk hits released in the same year such as 'God Save the Queen' and 'White Riot' never seem to get a look in." Daryl Easlea of BBC described Buckingham's compositions as the best tracks on Rumours, "Go Your Own Way" included. In a review of the Rumours Deluxe Edition, Steven Rosen praised Buckingham's acoustic guitar strumming and raw vocal delivery, all of which keeps the listener "riveted". Matthew Greenwald of AllMusic noted the song's folky sound, reminiscent of pre-Beatles bands like the Everly Brothers. Greenwald also praised the lively chord changes and bombastic choruses. "All of these factors, plus a great performance from the band (especially Buckingham's exquisite guitar solo) helped make the song one of the band's biggest and most timeless hits, ever."

"Go Your Own Way" was ranked number 120 by Rolling Stone magazine on their list of 500 greatest songs of all time in 2010, and re-ranked number 401 in 2021. It is on the Rock and Roll Hall of Fame's 500 Songs that Shaped Rock and Roll list. Rolling Stone also ranked it No. 1 on its list of Fleetwood Mac's 50 Greatest Songs. In 2012, "Go Your Own Way" was listed by music magazine NME in 33rd place on its list of "50 Most Explosive Choruses". The Guardian and Paste ranked the song number two and number eight, respectively, on their lists of the 30 greatest Fleetwood Mac songs.

"Go Your Own Way" was nominated for the Grammy Award for Best Vocal Arrangement in 1978, but lost to "New Kid in Town" by the Eagles.

== Live performances and other appearances ==
Fleetwood Mac first played "Go Your Own Way" during their 1977 Rumours Tour, where it was played on over 100 occasions. Beginning with this tour, Buckingham's guitar tech, Ray Lindsey, would cover the song's acoustic guitar part onstage. Lindsey explained that Fleetwood Mac was usually keen on having distinct arrangements between the studio recording and live renditions, but that "Go Your Own Way" was the first time that Buckingham sought to deviate from this approach by aiming to integrate instruments into "Go Your Own Way" that Fleetwood Mac was unable to cover onstage. During Fleetwood Mac's 1979–1980 Tusk Tour, where they played "Go Your Own Way" at every tour stop, a live recording of "Go Your Own Way" culled from a show in Cleveland was included on the band's 1980 Live album. "Go Your Own Way" was included in the setlist of the band's 1982 Mirage Tour.

After Buckingham's departure from Fleetwood Mac in 1987, the band continued to play "Go Your Own Way" in concert. One of Buckingham's replacements, Billy Burnette, singled out "Go Your Own Way" as his favorite song to play on the Shake the Cage Tour. On the final night of Fleetwood Mac's 1990 Behind the Mask Tour, Buckingham joined the band onstage to perform "Go Your Own Way". The 1994–95 lineup of Fleetwood Mac also included "Go Your Own Way" on their Another Link in the Chain Tour, making it the only time Fleetwood Mac played the song without both Buckingham and Nicks.

"Go Your Own Way" served as the main set closer for Fleetwood Mac's 1997 The Dance Tour. The song also appeared on its accompanying album, The Dance, which also included a live recording of "Silver Springs", the B-side to the studio recording of "Go Your Own Way". The live recording of "Go Your Own Way" was issued as the b-side for all editions of "Silver Springs" and the German single for "Temporary One" in 1997.

"Go Your Own Way" appeared on the DVD and CD of Fleetwood Mac: Live in Boston, filmed from their Say You Will Tour in 2003. During both this tour and their 2013 tour, "Go Your Own Way" served as the final song of the main set. On An Evening with Fleetwood Mac, Buckingham's replacements Mike Campbell and Neil Finn shared guitar duties, while the latter also doubled up on lead vocals. On August 31, 2023, a live recording of "Go Your Way" was released one week before the release of the Rumours Live album. The recording was taken from a 29 August 1977 performance at the Forum in Los Angeles.

Buckingham has also played the song on his solo tours starting in 1992 for his Out of the Cradle tour. During these performances, he would preface the main set by assuring the audience that "as long as you don't call out, 'Go Your Own Way' too soon, we'll get along great." "Go Your Own Way" was included as the final song of the main set on Buckingham's 2008 tour, which included touring members Neale Heywood, Brett Tuggle, and Walfredo Reyes Jr. Buckingham also played the song in 2018 during the promotion of his Solo Anthology compilation album.

Throughout the years, "Go Your Own Way" has appeared on numerous Fleetwood Mac compilation albums, including Greatest Hits in 1988, 25 Years – The Chain in 1992, The Very Best of Fleetwood Mac in 2002, Opus Collection in 2013, and 50 Years – Don't Stop in 2018.

== Track listing ==
- US vinyl (Warner Brothers Records – WBS 8304)
1. "Go Your Own Way" – 3:34
2. "Silver Springs" – 4:33

== Personnel ==
- Lindsey Buckingham – guitars, lead and backing vocals
- Stevie Nicks – backing vocals
- Christine McVie – Hammond organ, backing vocals
- John McVie – bass guitar
- Mick Fleetwood – drums, maracas, cymbals

== Charts ==
=== Weekly charts ===
Chart (1977)	Peak position
Australia (Kent Music Report)	20
Belgium (Ultratop 50 Flanders)	1
Belgium (Ultratop 50 Wallonia)	9
Canada Top Singles (RPM)	11
Canada Adult Contemporary (RPM)	43
Netherlands (Dutch Top 40)	1
Netherlands (Single Top 100)	1
New Zealand (Recorded Music NZ)	23
South Africa (Springbok Radio)	4
UK Singles (Official Charts)	38
US Billboard Hot 100	10
US Adult Contemporary (Billboard)	45
US Cash Box Top 100	10
US Pop/Adult (Radio & Records)	23
US Top 40 (Radio & Records)	8
US Record World Singles	10
West Germany (GfK)	11

Chart (2020)	Peak position
US Hot Rock & Alternative Songs (Billboard)	19

Chart (2023)	Peak position
Ireland (IRMA) Top 100	85

Chart (2025–2026)	Peak position
Sweden Heatseeker (Sverigetopplistan)	3

=== Year-end charts ===
Chart (1977)	Position
Belgium (Ultratop Flanders)	17
Canada Top Singles (RPM)	109
Netherlands (Dutch Top 40)	7
Netherlands (Single Top 100)	6
US Billboard Hot 100	94
US Cash Box Top 100	86
US Top 40 (Radio & Records)	45

Chart (2022)	Position
Australia (ARIA)	91

Chart (2023)	Position
Australia (ARIA)	96
New Zealand (Recorded Music NZ)	49
UK Singles (OCC)	91

Chart (2025)	Position
UK Singles (OCC)	94

== Certifications ==
Region	Certification	Certified units/sales
Denmark (IFPI Danmark)	Platinum	90,000^{‡}
Italy (FIMI)	Gold	50,000^{‡}
New Zealand (RMNZ)	11× Platinum	330,000^{‡}
Spain (Promusicae)	Gold	30,000^{‡}
United Kingdom (BPI)	6× Platinum	3,600,000^{‡}
^{‡} Sales+streaming figures based on certification alone.

== Other versions ==
The Cranberries released their rendition of "Go Your Own Way" on The Complete Sessions release of To The Faithful Departed in 2002.

Wilson Phillips recorded a new version of "Go Your Own Way" for their 2004 reunion album California. The song peaked at number 13 on the Billboard Adult Contemporary chart. In New Zealand, "Go Your Own Way" topped the country's adult contemporary radio chart for several weeks.

In 2011, Lea Michele of the American musical comedy drama Glee sang the song on season two's "Rumours" episode. This cover would go on to peak at No. 45 in USA and 51 in the UK. A year later, in 2012, the American singer-songwriter Lissie charted with her version. This rendition was included on the Nicholas Sparks movie soundtrack for Safe Haven, and used in Season 1, Episode 3 of the TV series A Discovery of Witches.

In 2022, Ben Platt and Aly & AJ performed the song on the former's Reverie Tour and during the Disneyland portions on the 2023 edition of Dick Clark's New Year's Rockin' Eve.

After a 2024 PayPal commercial with Will Ferrell singing a slightly revised version of Fleetwood Mac's "Everywhere" a 2025 ad campaign starring Ferrell used an altered version of "Go Your Own Way", with the words "Pay your own way".
