= Herbert W. Worthington =

Herbert "Herbie" Wheeler Worthington lll (May 25, 1944 – November 2013), was an influential rock and roll photographer until his death at 69, in 2013. There was no HWW "Senior", or HWW "Junior". Herbie added the III himself. He was best known as the photographer for Fleetwood Mac and Stevie Nicks (including the covers for her first two albums, Bella Donna and The Wild Heart). It was his photograph that was run on the cover of the Fleetwood Mac Rumours album and was instrumental in creating the iconic imagery (like the crystal ball) that is still associated with Fleetwood Mac today. He photographed over 40 covers for several bands and artists, including Buddy Miles, Paris, Jesse Cutler 20/20 and Lita Ford, among many others, in his 30+ years as a rock music photographer.

== Career ==
Worthington grew up in South Los Angeles, and in the 1960s he started associating with the music scene. Later, in the early 1970s, while living with his friend Buddy Miles, a friend gave him a camera. Living and working with Buddy Miles, Worthington got to know other musicians, such as Steve Winwood, Sly Stone and Jimi Hendrix. Hendrix became a very close friend, and Worthington would end up traveling with Hendrix on several shows in 1969.

While living with Buddy Miles, Worthington notes it was Ron Raffaelli, personal photographer of Jimi Hendrix, who taught him about photography. Worthington became well known for his photography as he became even more involved in the entertainment industry.

== Final years and death ==
Worthington had an antique store, "House of Worthington," in Los Angeles, on La Brea, selling gothic furniture and antiques. In 2007, Worthington had a website "Herbert W. Worthington", in which he sold Stevie Nicks posters, calendars, prints and T-shirts.

Some of the last projects Worthington contributed to were, photographs to Ken Caillat's book, "Making Rumours", Dave Grohl's Sound City documentary, The long-awaited WB's 'Rumours' CD/LP/DVD Reissue and Fleetwood Mac's album Say You Will, and the Fleetwood Mac documentary Destiny Rules.

Worthington lived his last years in Pasadena, and kept a relatively low profile. Herbert W. Worthington died from heart disease in November 2013.
