= Rumours (album) =

1977 studio album by Fleetwood Mac

Studio album by Fleetwood Mac
- Released: 4 February 1977
- Recorded: February–August 1976
- Studios: Criteria (Miami); Record Plant (Sausalito and Los Angeles); Wally Heider's Studio 3 (Hollywood); Producer's Workshop; Sound City Studios; Davlen (North Hollywood); Zellerbach Auditorium (Berkeley)
- Genres: Pop rock; soft rock
- Length: 39:03
- Label: Warner Bros.
- Producers: Fleetwood Mac; Ken Caillat; Richard Dashut

Fleetwood Mac chronology
Fleetwood Mac (1975)	Rumours (1977)	Tusk (1979)

Singles from Rumours
- 1. "Go Your Own Way" Released: December 1976; 2. "Dreams" Released: March 1977 (US); 3. "Don't Stop" Released: April 1977 (UK); 4. "You Make Loving Fun" Released: September 1977

Rumours is the eleventh studio album by the British and American rock band Fleetwood Mac, released on 4 February 1977, by Warner Bros. Records. Largely recorded in California in 1976, it was produced by the band with Ken Caillat and Richard Dashut. The recording sessions took place as the band members dealt with breakups with one another and struggled with heavy drug use, both of which shaped the album's direction and lyrics.

Recorded with the intention of making a pop album that would expand on the commercial success of their tenth studio album, Fleetwood Mac (1975), Rumours contains a mix of electric and acoustic instrumentation, accented rhythms, guitars, and keyboards, with lyrics concerning personal and often troubled relationships. Its release was postponed by delays in the mixing process. The band promoted the album with a worldwide concert tour.

Rumours became the band's first number-one album on the UK Albums Chart and also topped the US Billboard 200. It received multi-platinum certifications in Australia, Canada, Denmark, New Zealand, the United Kingdom, and the United States. As of February 2023, Rumours had sold over 40 million copies worldwide, making it one of the best-selling albums of all time. All of its four singles—"Go Your Own Way", "Dreams", "Don't Stop", and "You Make Loving Fun"—reached the top 10 of the US Billboard Hot 100, with "Dreams" reaching number one. In 2004, Rumours was remastered and reissued, with the addition of the track "Silver Springs" and outtakes from the recording sessions.

On release, the album garnered universal acclaim from critics, who praised its production quality and the vocal harmonies of the band's three singers, and won Album of the Year at the 1978 Grammy Awards. Retrospectively, Rumours has continued to receive acclaim and is widely considered Fleetwood Mac's magnum opus and one of the greatest albums of all time. It was inducted to the Grammy Hall of Fame in 2003 and was selected for preservation in the National Recording Registry in 2017 by the Library of Congress for being "culturally, historically, or aesthetically significant". In 2020, Rumours was ranked seventh in Rolling Stone's list of the "500 Greatest Albums of All Time".

== Background ==
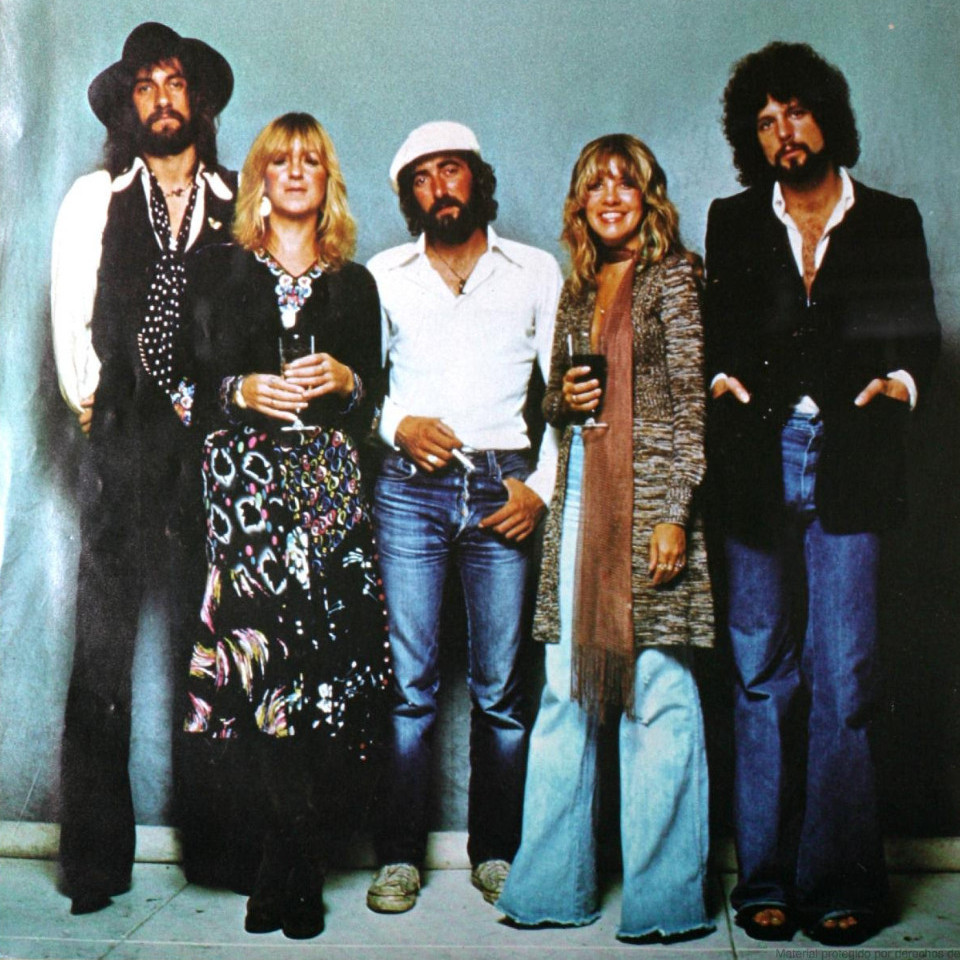
Fleetwood Mac in 1977. From left to right: Mick Fleetwood, Christine McVie, John McVie, Stevie Nicks and Lindsey Buckingham.

After guitarist Bob Welch left Fleetwood Mac in 1974, drummer Mick Fleetwood, keyboardist and vocalist Christine McVie, and bassist John McVie were joined by guitarist and singer Lindsey Buckingham and singer Stevie Nicks. In July 1975, Fleetwood Mac released its eponymous tenth album to great commercial success, reaching No. 1 in the U.S. in 1976; the record's singles "Over My Head", "Rhiannon" and "Say You Love Me" all reached the Top 20 there.

The band's success belied turmoil amongst its members; after six months of non-stop touring, the McVies divorced, ending eight years of marriage. The divorce was precipitated by John McVie's severe alcoholism. The couple stopped talking to each other socially and discussed only musical matters. Buckingham and Nicks were having an on/off relationship that led them to fight often between takes, including during "You Make Loving Fun". The duo's vicious arguments stopped only when they worked on songs together. Fleetwood faced domestic problems of his own after discovering that his wife Jenny, mother of his two children, was having an affair with his best friend. In the midst of the recording process, producer Ken Caillat felt he had to take on the role of therapist just to keep the sessions on track, as Nicks was prone to storming out after hearing Buckingham's lyrics. Caillat was only initially hired to be the engineer (after the success of "Rhiannon") and was primarily focused on the sound of the instruments until Christine McVie asked him serve as a traditional producer as she wanted his opinion on vocal takes. The band were often distracted in the studio and not adhering to their noon-to-midnight recording schedule, as they were taking "stimulants" which made them want to record until 3:00 or 4:00 AM, but not return to work at their scheduled time the next day. The recording process ultimately took a year.

Press intrusions into the band members' lives led to inaccurate stories. Christine McVie was reported to have been in the hospital with a serious illness, while Buckingham and Nicks were declared the parents of Fleetwood's daughter Lucy after being photographed with her. The press also wrote about a rumoured return of original Fleetwood Mac members Peter Green, Danny Kirwan, and Jeremy Spencer for a tenth anniversary tour. Despite false reports, the band did not change its lineup, although its members had no time to come to terms with the separations before recording for a new album began. Fleetwood has noted the "tremendous emotional sacrifices" made by everyone just to attend studio work and that "[they] were lucky to get out alive." In early 1976, Fleetwood Mac crafted some new tracks in Florida. Fleetwood and John McVie fired their producer Keith Olsen because he favoured a lower emphasis on the rhythm section. The duo formed a company called Seedy Management to represent the band's interests.

== Recording ==
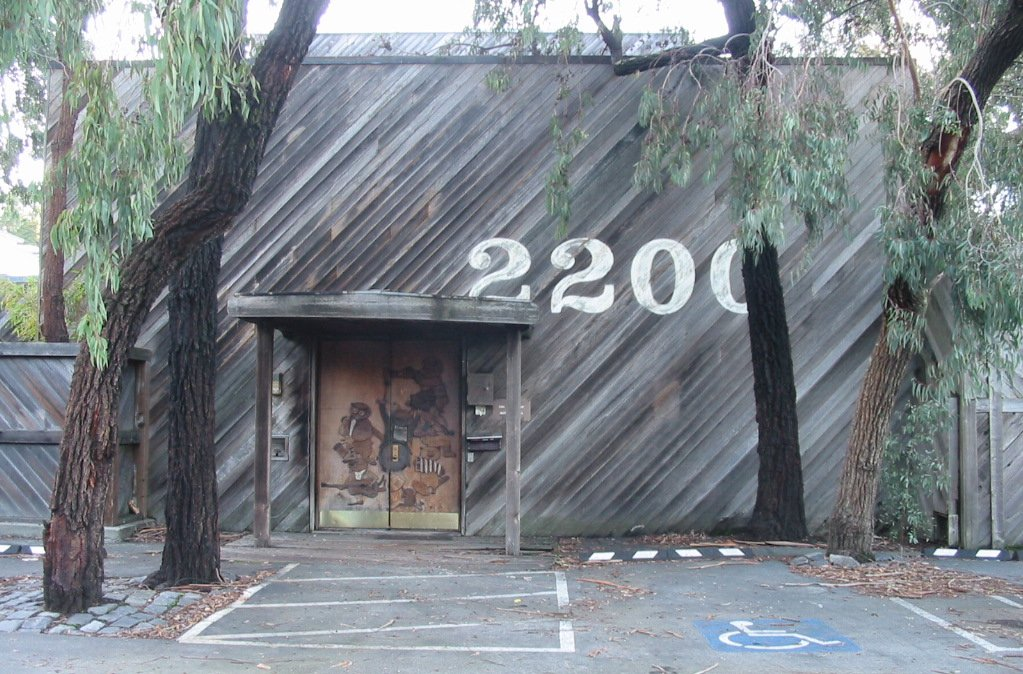
Rumours was largely recorded in Sausalito's Record Plant, a wooden structure with few windows, located at 2200 Marinship Way.

In February 1976, Fleetwood Mac convened at the Record Plant in Sausalito, California, with the engineers Ken Caillat and Richard Dashut. The three parties shared production duties, while the more technically adept Caillat was responsible for most of the engineering; he took a leave of absence from Wally Heider Studios in Los Angeles on the premise that Fleetwood Mac would eventually use their facilities. The set-up in Sausalito included several small recording rooms in a large, windowless, wooden building. Most band members complained about the studio and wanted to record at their homes, but Fleetwood did not allow any moves. Christine McVie and Nicks decided to live in two condominiums near the city's harbour, while the male contingent stayed at the studio's lodge in the adjacent hills. Recording occurred in a six-by-nine-metre (20 by 30 ft) room equipped with a 3M 24-track tape machine, a range of high-quality microphones, and an API mixing console with 550A equalisers; the latter were used to control frequency differences or a track's timbre. Although Caillat was impressed with the set-up, he felt that the room lacked ambience because of its "very dead speakers" and large amounts of soundproofing.

The record's working title in Sausalito was Yesterday's Gone. Buckingham took charge of the studio sessions to make "a pop album". According to Dashut, while Fleetwood and the McVies came from an improvisational blues rock background, the guitarist understood "the craft of record making". During the formative stages of compositions, Buckingham and Christine McVie played guitar and piano together to create the album's basic structures. The latter was the only classically trained musician in Fleetwood Mac, but both shared a similar sense of musicality. When the band jammed, Fleetwood often played his drum kit outside the studio's partition screen to better gauge Caillat's and Dashut's reactions to the music's groove. Baffles were placed around the drums and around John McVie, who played his bass guitar facing Fleetwood. Buckingham performed close to the rhythm section, while Christine McVie's keyboards were kept away from the drum kit. Caillat and Dashut spent about nine days working with a range of microphones and amplifiers to get a larger sound, before discovering they could adjust the sound effectively on the API mixing console.

As the studio sessions progressed, the band members' new intimate relationships that formed after various separations started to have a negative effect on Fleetwood Mac. The musicians did not meet or socialise after their daily work at the Record Plant. At the time, the hippie movement still affected Sausalito's culture and drugs were readily available. Open-ended budgets enabled the band and the engineers to become self-indulgent; sleepless nights and the extensive use of cocaine marked much of the album's production. Chris Stone, one of the Record Plant's owners, indicated in 1997 that Fleetwood Mac brought "excess at its most excessive" by taking over the studio for long and extremely expensive sessions; he stated, "The band would come in at 7 at night, have a big feast, party till 1 or 2 in the morning, and then when they were so whacked-out they couldn't do anything, they'd start recording".

Trauma, Trau-ma. The sessions were like a cocktail party every night—people everywhere. We ended up staying in these weird hospital rooms ... and of course John and me were not exactly the best of friends.

— Christine McVie, on the emotional strain when making Rumours in Sausalito

Nicks has suggested that Fleetwood Mac created the best music when in the worst shape, while, according to Buckingham, the tensions between band members formed the recording process and led to "the whole being more than the sum of the parts". The couple's work became "bittersweet" after their final split, although Buckingham still had a skill for taking Nicks' tracks and "making them beautiful". The vocal harmonies between the duo and Christine McVie worked well and were captured using the best microphones available. Nicks' lyrical focus allowed the instrumentals in the songs that she wrote to be looser and more abstract. According to Dashut, all the recordings captured "emotion and feeling without a middle man ... or tempering". John McVie tended to clash with Buckingham about the make-up of songs, but both admit to achieving good outcomes. Christine McVie's "Songbird", which Caillat felt needed a concert hall's ambience, was recorded during an all-night session at Zellerbach Auditorium in Berkeley, across San Francisco Bay from Sausalito.

Following over two months in Sausalito, Fleetwood arranged a ten-day tour to give the band a break and get fan feedback. After the concerts, recording resumed at venues in Los Angeles, including Wally Heider Studios. Christine McVie and Nicks did not attend most of the sessions and took time off until they were needed to record any remaining vocals. The rest of Fleetwood Mac, with Caillat and Dashut, struggled to finalise the overdubbing and mixing of Rumours after the Sausalito tapes were damaged by repeated use during recording; the kick and snare drum audio tracks sounded "lifeless". A sell-out autumn tour of the US was cancelled to allow the completion of the album, whose scheduled release date of September 1976 was pushed back. A specialist was hired to rectify the Sausalito tapes using a vari-speed oscillator. Through a pair of headphones that played the damaged tapes in his left ear and the safety master recordings in his right, he converged their respective speeds aided by the timings provided by the snare and hi-hat audio tracks. The prolonged overdubbing process had also worn the 24-track master tape, leaving many of its sounds dull and flat by the time mixing began; engineers used the then-novel Aphex Aural Exciter, a harmonic enhancer, to restore some of the tape's lost top-end clarity. Fleetwood Mac and their co-producers wanted a "no-filler" final product, in which every track seemed a potential single. After the final mastering stage and hearing the songs back-to-back, the band members sensed they had recorded something "pretty powerful".

== Composition ==
=== Lyrics ===
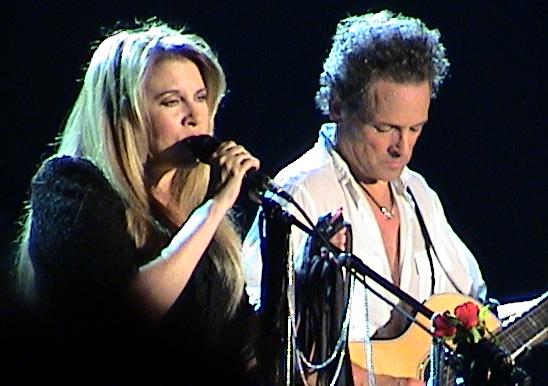
Nicks and Buckingham (pictured in 2003) were integral to the songwriting on Fleetwood Mac and Rumours.

Fleetwood Mac's main songwriters—Buckingham, Christine McVie, and Nicks—worked individually on songs but sometimes shared lyrics. "The Chain" is the only track on which all members, including Fleetwood and John McVie, collaborated. All songs on Rumours concern personal, often troubled relationships. According to Christine McVie, the fact that the lyricists were focusing on the various separations became apparent to the band only in hindsight. "You Make Loving Fun" is about her boyfriend, Fleetwood Mac's lighting director, whom she dated after splitting from John. Nicks' "Dreams" details a breakup and has a hopeful message, while Buckingham's similar effort in "Go Your Own Way" is more pessimistic. After a short fling with a New England woman, he was inspired to write "Never Going Back Again", a song about the illusion of thinking that sadness will never occur again once content with life.

"Don't Stop"
The lyrics of "Don't Stop" are about having an optimistic outlook on life. Inspired by the triple step, the song contains music from both normal and prepared pianos.

"Don't Stop", written by Christine McVie, is a song about optimism. She noted that Buckingham helped her craft the verses because their personal sensibilities overlapped. McVie's next track, "Songbird", features more introspective lyrics about "nobody and everybody" in the form of "a little prayer". "Oh Daddy", the last McVie song on the album, was written about Fleetwood and his wife Jenny Boyd, who had just got back together. The band's nickname for Fleetwood was "the Big Daddy". McVie commented that the writing is slightly sarcastic and focuses on the drummer's direction for Fleetwood Mac, which according to her always turned out to be right. Nicks' song "Gold Dust Woman" is inspired by Los Angeles and the hardship encountered in such a city. After struggling with the rock lifestyle, Nicks became addicted to cocaine; the lyrics address her belief in "keeping going".

=== Music ===
Featuring a soft rock and pop rock sound, Rumours is built around a mix of acoustic and electric instrumentation. Buckingham's guitar work and Christine McVie's use of Fender Rhodes piano or Hammond B-3 organ are present on all but two tracks. The record often includes stressed drum sounds and distinctive percussion such as congas and maracas. It opens with "Second Hand News", originally an acoustic demo titled "Strummer". After hearing Bee Gees' "Jive Talkin'", Buckingham and co-producer Dashut built up the song with four audio tracks of electric guitar and the use of chair percussion to evoke Celtic rock. "Dreams" includes "ethereal spaces" and a recurring two note pattern on the bass guitar. Nicks wrote the song in an afternoon and led the vocals, while the band played around her. The third track on Rumours, "Never Going Back Again", began as "Brushes", a simple acoustic guitar tune played by Buckingham, with snare rolls by Fleetwood using brushes; the band added vocals and further instrumental audio tracks to make it more layered. Inspired by triple step dancing patterns, "Don't Stop" includes both conventional acoustic and tack piano. In the latter instrument, nails are placed on the points where the hammers hit the strings, producing a more percussive sound. "Go Your Own Way" is more guitar-oriented and has a four-to-the-floor dance beat influenced by the Rolling Stones' "Street Fighting Man". The album's pace slows down with "Songbird", conceived solely by Christine McVie using a nine-foot Steinway piano.

"Gold Dust Woman"
"Gold Dust Woman" is influenced by jazz and features a dobro. The song's lyrics focus on Nicks' struggle with cocaine addiction.

Side two of Rumours begins with "The Chain", one of the record's most complicated compositions. A Christine McVie demo, "Keep Me There", and a Nicks song were re-cut in the studio and were heavily edited to form parts of the track. The whole of the band crafted the rest using an approach akin to creating a film score; John McVie provided a prominent solo using a fretless bass guitar, which marked a speeding up in tempo and the start of the song's final third. Inspired by R&B, "You Make Loving Fun" has a simpler composition and features a clavinet, a special type of keyboard instrument, while the rhythm section plays interlocking notes and beats. The ninth track on Rumours, "I Don't Want to Know", makes use of a twelve string guitar and harmonised vocals. Influenced by the music of Buddy Holly, Buckingham and Nicks created it in 1974 before they were in Fleetwood Mac. "Oh Daddy" was crafted spontaneously and includes improvised bass guitar patterns from John McVie and keyboard blips from Christine McVie. The album ends with "Gold Dust Woman", a song inspired by free jazz, which has music from a harpsichord, a Fender Stratocaster guitar, and a dobro, an acoustic guitar whose sound is produced by one or more metal cones.

== Promotion and release ==
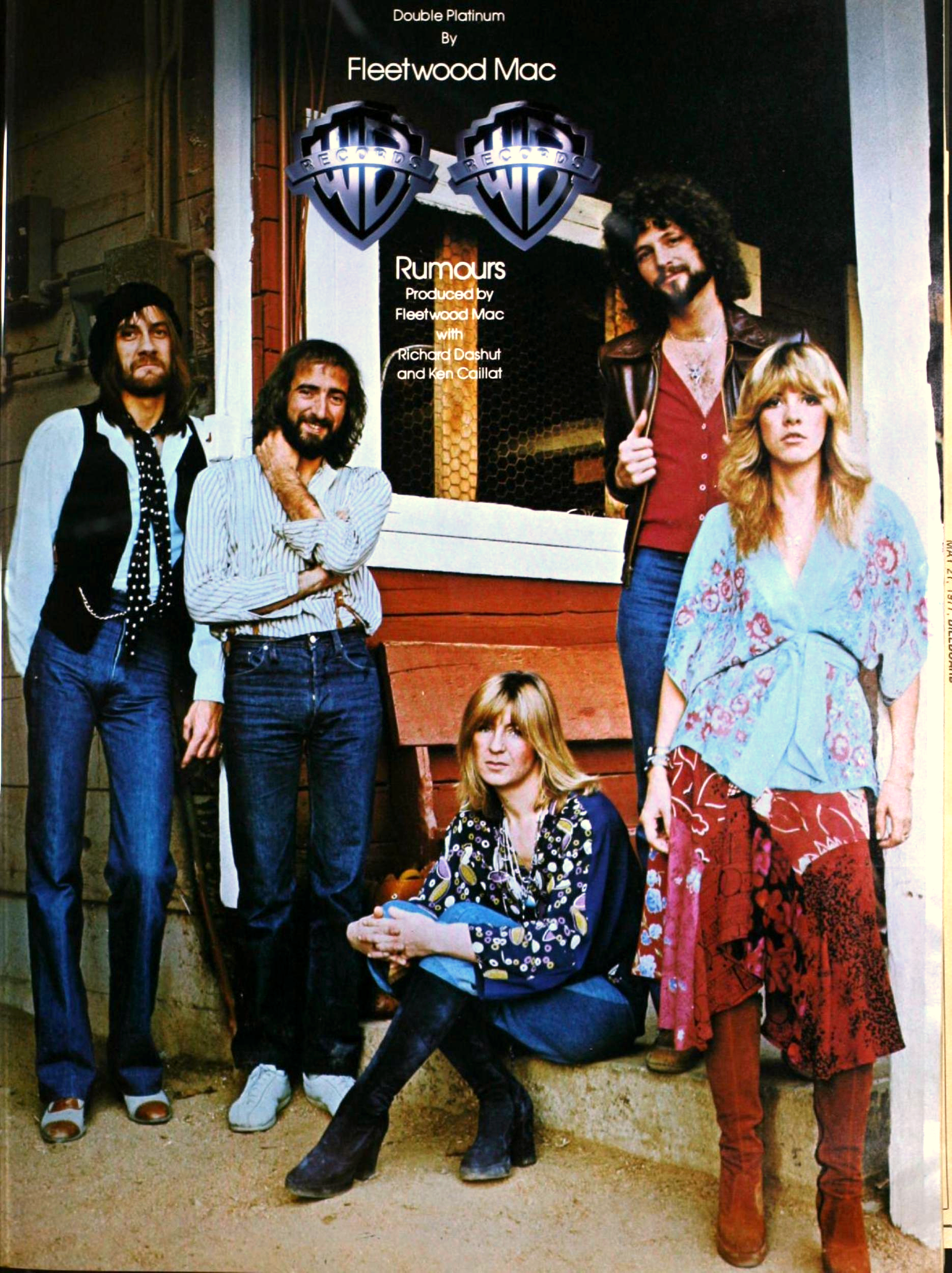
Trade ad for Rumours

In Autumn 1976, while still recording, Fleetwood Mac showcased tracks from Rumours at the Universal Amphitheatre in Los Angeles. John McVie suggested the album title to the band because he felt the members were writing "journals and diaries" about each other through music. Warner Bros. confirmed the release details to the press in December and chose "Go Your Own Way" as a December 1976 promotional single. The label's aggressive marketing of 1975's Fleetwood Mac, in which links with dozens of FM and AM radio stations were formed across America, aided the promotion of Rumours. At the time, the album's advance order of 800,000 copies was the largest in Warner Bros.' history.

Rumours was released on 4 February 1977 in the US, and a week later in the UK. On 28 February 1977, after rehearsing at SIR Studios in Los Angeles, Fleetwood Mac embarked on the Rumours Tour, which visited North America, Europe, Oceania and Asia. Nicks has noted that, after performing mostly Rumours songs during gigs, the band initially encountered poor reception from fans who were not accustomed to the new material. A one-off March performance at a benefit concert for United States Senator Birch Bayh in Indiana was followed by a short tour of the UK, the Netherlands, France, and Germany in April. Nigel Williamson of Uncut called Fleetwood Mac's performances "rock's greatest soap opera". "Dreams", released in March 1977, became the band's only number one on the US Billboard Hot 100 that June.

=== Artwork ===
The front cover art features a stylised shot of Fleetwood with his foot raised on a stool, and Nicks dressed in her "Rhiannon" stage persona, while the back has a montage of band portraits; all the photographs were taken by Herbert Worthington. Fleetwood sports a pair of lavatory chains with wooden balls hanging down between his legs, and holds a crystal ball in his left hand.

=== Deluxe edition ===
Rumours was reissued on 28 January 2013 as a six-disc super deluxe edition box set, for the album's 35th anniversary. The set included four CDs that were divided into: a remastered version of the original album that features "Silver Springs"; a dozen unreleased live recordings from the 1977 "Rumours" world tour; sixteen new and unreleased tracks from the album's recording sessions, titled "More From The Recording Sessions"; and another eighteen session tracks, previously found on the 2004 reissue of the album, titled as "Recording Sessions, Roughs & Outtakes". The last two discs were a 140-gram gatefold vinyl edition of the album and a DVD of "The Rosebud Film", a documentary created by Michael Collins to promote the European leg of the "Rumours" tour, with behind-the-scenes interviews, rehearsal footage and live performances.

Among the extra content on discs three and four, two different demos of "Planets of the Universe" were featured. Written by Nicks in 1976 during the recording of Rumours about her breakup with Buckingham, the song was rehearsed for the album but never recorded. A new version would officially be released on Nicks' 2001 solo album, Trouble in Shangri-La. Another Nicks-penned demo, "Think About It", was included on disc four. Written in 1975 and dedicated to Christine McVie, the finished recording would end up on her 1981 album, Bella Donna.

=== Rumours Live ===
On 8 September 2023, Fleetwood Mac released a live album from the Rumours Tour, titled Rumours Live. Recorded by Ken Caillat on the band's opening night at The Forum on 29 August 1977, its setlist was mostly taken from Fleetwood Mac and Rumours, except for 1969's "Oh Well". The live recording of "Gold Dust Woman" appeared as a bonus track on the deluxe edition of Live, but the show's other seventeen tracks had previously been unreleased.

Rumours Live was issued in two physical formats: a two-CD set, and a double-LP gatefold edition, pressed on 180g black vinyl, with lacquers cut by Chris Bellman at Bernie Grundman Mastering. A clear vinyl version of the LPs was also available.

== Critical reception ==
Professional ratings
Aggregate scores
Source	Rating
Metacritic	99/100 (deluxe version)
Review scores
Source	Rating
AllMusic	5/5 stars
Blender	5/5 stars
Christgau's Record Guide	A
Entertainment Weekly	A
The Independent	5/5 stars
Mojo	5/5 stars
Pitchfork	10/10
Rolling Stone	5/5 stars
The Rolling Stone Album Guide	5/5 stars
Uncut	5/5 stars

Rumours has received universal acclaim from music critics since its release. Much of the praise has focused on the album’s production, vocal harmonies, and musical arrangements. Robert Christgau, reviewing in The Village Voice, described it as "more consistent and more eccentric" than its predecessor. He added that it "jumps right out of the speakers at you". Rolling Stone magazine's John Swenson believed the interplay among the three vocalists was one of the album's most pleasing elements; he stated, "Despite the interminable delay in finishing the record, Rumours proves that the success of Fleetwood Mac was no fluke." In a review for The New York Times, John Rockwell said the album is "a delightful disk, and one hopes the public thinks so, too", while Dave Marsh of the St. Petersburg Times claimed the songs are "as grandly glossy as anything right now". Robert Hilburn was less receptive and called Rumours a "frustratingly uneven" record in his review for the Los Angeles Times, while Juan Rodriguez of The Gazette suggested that, while the music is "crisper and clearer", Fleetwood Mac's ideas are "slightly more muddled". The album finished fourth in The Village Voice's 1977 Pazz & Jop critics' poll, which aggregated the votes of hundreds of prominent reviewers.

In a retrospective review, AllMusic editor Stephen Thomas Erlewine gave Rumours five stars and noted that, regardless of the voyeuristic element, the record was "an unparalleled blockbuster" because of the music's quality; he concluded, "Each tune, each phrase regains its raw, immediate emotional power—which is why Rumours touched a nerve upon its 1977 release, and has since transcended its era to be one of the greatest, most compelling pop albums of all time." According to Slant Magazine's Barry Walsh, Fleetwood Mac drew on romantic dysfunction and personal turmoil to create a timeless, five-star record, while Andy Gill of The Independent claimed it "represents, along with The Eagles Greatest Hits, the high-water mark of America's Seventies rock-culture expansion, the quintessence of a counter-cultural mindset lured into coke-fuelled hedonism". In 2007, the BBC's Daryl Easlea labelled the sonic results as "near perfect", "like a thousand angels kissing you sweetly on the forehead", while Patrick McKay of Stylus Magazine wrote, "What distinguishes Rumours—what makes it art—is the contradiction between its cheerful surface and its anguished heart. Here is a radio-friendly record about anger, recrimination, and loss."

== Commercial performance ==
Rumours was a huge commercial success and became Fleetwood Mac's second US number-one record, following the 1975 eponymous release. It stayed at the top of the Billboard 200 for 31 non-consecutive weeks, while also reaching number one in the United Kingdom, Australia, Canada, and New Zealand. It re-entered the Billboard 200 chart at number 11 in May 2011, and the Australian ARIA chart at number 2, after several songs from the album were used for the "Rumours" episode of the American TV series Glee. It re-entered the Billboard 200 top ten in October 2020 in the wake of a viral TikTok by Nathan Apodaca which showed him skateboarding while "Dreams" played, even prompting Mick Fleetwood, Stevie Nicks and Lindsey Buckingham to create similar videos. The album was certified platinum in America and the UK within months of release after one million units and 300,000 units were shipped, respectively. All three major US trade publications—Billboard, Cash Box, and Record World—named it Album of the Year for 1977. After a debut at number seven, Rumours peaked at the top of the UK Albums Chart in January 1978, becoming Fleetwood Mac's first number one album in the country. In February, the band and co-producers Caillat and Dashut won the 1978 Grammy Award for Album of the Year. By March, the album had sold over 10 million copies worldwide, including over eight million in the US alone.

By 1980, 13 million copies of Rumours had been sold worldwide. As of 2017, sales were over 40 million copies. As of November 2023, Rumours has spent over 1,000 weeks in the top 100 of the UK Albums Chart. It is the 11th-best-selling album in UK history, and is certified 14× platinum by the British Phonographic Industry, the equivalent of 4.2 million units shipped. The record has received a Diamond Award from the Recording Industry Association of America for a 20× platinum certification or 20 million copies shipped, making it, as of 2021, tied for the 11th-highest certified album in US history (by number of copies shipped). Rumours was the UK's bestselling album on vinyl during 2020, with the Official Charts Company confirming 32,500 annual sales in the format.

== Legacy ==
Mick Fleetwood has called Rumours "the most important album we ever made", because its success allowed the group to continue recording for years to come. Pop culture journalist Chuck Klosterman links the record's sales figures to its "really likable songs" but suggests that "no justification for greatness" is intrinsically provided by them. In 1997, The Guardian surveyed renowned critics, artists, and radio DJs, who placed the record at number 78 in the list of the 100 Best Albums Ever. In 1998, Fleetwood produced and released Legacy: A Tribute to Fleetwood Mac's Rumours, an album that consisted of one cover of each song off Rumours by an act influenced by it, including alternative rock bands Tonic, Matchbox 20, and Goo Goo Dolls; Celtic rock groups The Corrs and The Cranberries; and singer-songwriters Elton John, Duncan Sheik, and Jewel. Other acts influenced by Rumours include Tori Amos, hard rock group Saliva, indie rock band Death Cab for Cutie, and art pop singer Lorde, who called it a "perfect record".

"There was a time when Fleetwood Mac's Rumours was just seen as an album that sold incredibly well; over the past five years, though, it's become more acceptable to classify Rumours as great in and of itself."

— Chuck Klosterman in 2004, on recognition for the record

Rumours has frequently been considered one of the greatest albums of all time. It was inducted into the Grammy Hall of Fame in 2003, In 1998, Q placed it at number three—behind The Clash's London Calling and Pink Floyd's The Dark Side of the Moon—in its list of 50 Best Albums of the 70s. In 1999, Vibe featured it as one of 100 Essential Albums of the 20th Century. In 2001, VH1 ranked the record at number 16 during its 100 Greatest Albums countdown, while Slant included it as one of 50 Essential Pop Albums. The same year, USA Today placed Rumours at number 23 in its Top 40 Albums list, while Rolling Stone ranked it at number 25 in its special issue of "The 500 Greatest Albums of All Time", in 2003, the highest Fleetwood Mac placement, number 26 in a 2012 revised list, and number 7 in the 2020 and 2023 lists. In 2000, it was voted number 31 in Colin Larkin's All Time Top 1000 Albums. In 2006, Time named it in its All-TIME 100 Albums shortlist, while Mojo featured it in its unnumbered list of 70 from the 1970s: Decade's Greatest Albums. The record is included in both The Guardian's "1000 Albums to Hear Before You Die" and the book 1001 Albums You Must Hear Before You Die. For the 2013 reissue of the album, Pitchfork's Jessica Hopper gave the album a rare 10 out of 10, earning it a "best new reissue" designation.

The 2023 Tony-award-winning play Stereophonic is a fictionalized depiction of the recording sessions for the album. In 2024, sound engineer Ken Caillat sued the creators of the play, alleging that they adapted his memoir Making Rumours: The Inside Story of the Classic Fleetwood Mac Album without permission.

== Track listing ==
Side one
No.	Title	Writer(s)	Lead vocals	Length
1.	"Second Hand News"	Lindsey Buckingham	Buckingham	2:43
2.	"Dreams"	Stevie Nicks	Nicks	4:14
3.	"Never Going Back Again"	Buckingham	Buckingham	2:02
4.	"Don't Stop"	Christine McVie	Buckingham and C. McVie	3:11
5.	"Go Your Own Way"	Buckingham	Buckingham	3:38
6.	"Songbird"	C. McVie	C. McVie	3:20

Side two
No.	Title	Writer(s)	Lead vocals	Length
1.	"The Chain"	Buckingham; Mick Fleetwood; C. McVie; John McVie; Nicks	Buckingham with Nicks and C. McVie	4:28
2.	"You Make Loving Fun"	C. McVie	C. McVie	3:31
3.	"I Don't Want to Know"	Nicks	Nicks with Buckingham	3:11
4.	"Oh Daddy"	C. McVie	C. McVie	3:54
5.	"Gold Dust Woman"	Nicks	Nicks	4:51
Total length:				39:03

"Silver Springs", written by Stevie Nicks, has been included on some reissues as either track 6, 7 or 12 of the album, depending on the pressing. Many cassette releases swapped the positions of "Second Hand News" and "I Don't Want to Know".

== Personnel ==
Adapted from the album's liner notes, and Making of Rumours.

Fleetwood Mac

- Lindsey Buckingham – guitars, vocals, percussion (on "Second Hand News" and "You Make Loving Fun")
- Stevie Nicks – vocals
- Christine McVie – keyboards, synthesizer, vocals, vibraphone (on "Dreams")
- John McVie – bass guitar
- Mick Fleetwood – drums, percussion, electric harpsichord (on "Gold Dust Woman")

Production

- Fleetwood Mac – producers
- Ken Caillat; Richard Dashut – producers, engineers
- Chris Morris – assistant engineer
- Rhyno; Ray Lindsey; Jeff Jacobs – studio crew
- Ken Perry; Charlie Watts – mastering

Artwork

- Desmond Strobel – album design
- Herbert W. Worthington – photography, concept
- Fleetwood Mac – concept
- Larry Vigon/Vigon Nahas Vigon – hand lettering

== Charts ==
=== Weekly charts ===
Weekly chart performance for Rumours
Chart (1977–2026)	Peak position
Australian Albums (ARIA)	2
Australian Albums (Kent Music Report)	1
Austrian Albums (Ö3 Austria)	15
Belgian Albums (Ultratop Flanders)	11
Belgian Albums (Ultratop Wallonia)	19
Canadian Albums (Billboard)	5
Canadian Albums (RPM)	1
Croatian International Albums (HDU)	5
Danish Albums (Hitlisten)	23
Dutch Albums (Album Top 100)	1
French Albums (SNEP)	116
German Albums (Offizielle Top 100)	5
German Rock & Metal Albums (Offizielle Top 100)	8
Greek Albums (Billboard)	1
Hungarian Albums (MAHASZ)	20
Icelandic Albums (Tónlistinn)	4
Japanese Albums (Oricon)	33
New Zealand Albums (RMNZ)	1
Norwegian Albums (VG-lista)	17
Norwegian Rock Albums (IFPI Norge)	1
Portuguese Albums (AFP)	12
South African Albums Chart	1
Swedish Albums (Sverigetopplistan)	18
Swiss Albums (Schweizer Hitparade)	17
UK Albums (Official Charts)	1
US Billboard 200	1
US Top Catalog Albums (Billboard)	1
US Top Rock Albums (Billboard)	1

=== Monthly charts ===
Monthly chart performance
Chart (2026)	Position
Croatian International Vinyl Albums (HDU)	7

=== Year-end charts ===
1977 year-end charts for Rumours
Chart (1977)	Position
Australian Albums (Kent Music Report)	3
Canada Top Albums/CDs (RPM)	1
Dutch Albums (Album Top 100)	2
German Albums (Offizielle Top 100)	11
New Zealand Albums (RMNZ)	1
UK Albums (OCC)	5
US Billboard 200	1

1978 year-end charts for Rumours
Chart (1978)	Position
Australian Albums (Kent Music Report)	7
Canada Top Albums/CDs (RPM)	37
Dutch Albums (Album Top 100)	17
German Albums (Offizielle Top 100)	11
New Zealand Albums (RMNZ)	7
US Billboard 200	3

2011 year-end chart for Rumours
Chart (2011)	Position
UK Albums (OCC)	170

2013 year-end charts for Rumours
Chart (2013)	Position
Australian Albums (ARIA)	78
Belgian Albums (Ultratop Flanders)	159
UK Albums (OCC)	51

2014 year-end chart for Rumours
Chart (2014)	Position
UK Albums (OCC)	100

2016 year-end chart for Rumours
Chart (2016)	Position
UK Albums (OCC)	71

2017 year-end charts for Rumours
Chart (2017)	Position
UK Albums (OCC)	44
US Billboard 200	155
US Top Rock Albums (Billboard)	23

2018 year-end charts for Rumours
Chart (2018)	Position
Australian Albums (ARIA)	99
UK Albums (OCC)	48
US Billboard 200	91
US Top Rock Albums (Billboard)	9

2019 year-end charts for Rumours
Chart (2019)	Position
Belgian Albums (Ultratop Flanders)	65
UK Albums (OCC)	30
US Billboard 200	90
US Top Rock Albums (Billboard)	13

2020 year-end charts for Rumours
Chart (2020)	Position
Australian Albums (ARIA)	27
Belgian Albums (Ultratop Flanders)	91
Canadian Albums (Billboard)	47
Dutch Albums (Album Top 100)	49
Icelandic Albums (Tónlistinn)	49
Irish Albums (IRMA)	10
New Zealand Albums (RMNZ)	18
Swedish Albums (Sverigetopplistan)	59
UK Albums (OCC)	14
US Billboard 200	53
US Top Rock Albums (Billboard)	3

2021 year-end charts for Rumours
Chart (2021)	Position
Australian Albums (ARIA)	21
Belgian Albums (Ultratop Flanders)	53
Canadian Albums (Billboard)	30
Danish Albums (Hitlisten)	64
Dutch Albums (Album Top 100)	36
Icelandic Albums (Tónlistinn)	57
Irish Albums (IRMA)	14
New Zealand Albums (RMNZ)	12
Swedish Albums (Sverigetopplistan)	50
UK Albums (OCC)	17
US Billboard 200	34
US Top Rock Albums (Billboard)	3

2022 year-end charts for Rumours
Chart (2022)	Position
Australian Albums (ARIA)	20
Belgian Albums (Ultratop Flanders)	43
Canadian Albums (Billboard)	42
Danish Albums (Hitlisten)	90
Dutch Albums (Album Top 100)	14
Icelandic Albums (Tónlistinn)	63
New Zealand Albums (RMNZ)	10
Portuguese Albums (AFP)	25
Swedish Albums (Sverigetopplistan)	73
UK Albums (OCC)	20
US Billboard 200	30
US Top Rock Albums (Billboard)	1

2023 year-end charts for Rumours
Chart (2023)	Position
Australian Albums (ARIA)	26
Belgian Albums (Ultratop Flanders)	67
Canadian Albums (Billboard)	31
Danish Albums (Hitlisten)	77
Dutch Albums (Album Top 100)	9
Icelandic Albums (Tónlistinn)	41
New Zealand Albums (RMNZ)	5
Swedish Albums (Sverigetopplistan)	35
UK Albums (OCC)	22
US Billboard 200	25
US Top Rock Albums (Billboard)	3

2024 year-end charts for Rumours
Chart (2024)	Position
Australian Albums (ARIA)	24
Austrian Albums (Ö3 Austria)	54
Belgian Albums (Ultratop Flanders)	77
Canadian Albums (Billboard)	33
Croatian International Albums (HDU)	12
Danish Albums (Hitlisten)	76
Dutch Albums (Album Top 100)	8
Icelandic Albums (Tónlistinn)	62
Swedish Albums (Sverigetopplistan)	33
UK Albums (OCC)	23
US Billboard 200	34

2025 year-end charts for Rumours
Chart (2025)	Position
Australian Albums (ARIA)	29
Austrian Albums (Ö3 Austria)	63
Belgian Albums (Ultratop Flanders)	106
Canadian Albums (Billboard)	24
Croatian International Albums (HDU)	18
Dutch Albums (Album Top 100)	7
German Albums (Offizielle Top 100)	97
Icelandic Albums (Tónlistinn)	41
Swedish Albums (Sverigetopplistan)	57
UK Albums (OCC)	20
US Billboard 200	25
US Top Rock & Alternative Albums (Billboard)	3

== Certifications and sales ==
Certifications and sales for Rumours
Region	Certification	Certified units/sales
Australia (ARIA)	13× Platinum	950,000
Canada (Music Canada)	2× Diamond	2,000,000^{^}
Denmark (IFPI Danmark)	5× Platinum	100,000^{‡}
France (SNEP)	Platinum	300,000^{*}
Germany (BVMI)	5× Gold	1,250,000^{^}
Hong Kong (IFPI Hong Kong)	Platinum	20,000^{*}
Iceland (FHF)	Platinum	10,000
Ireland 2020–2021 vinyl sales	—	2,000
Italy (FIMI) sales since 2009	Platinum	50,000^{‡}
Netherlands (NVPI)	Platinum	165,000
New Zealand (RMNZ)	14× Platinum	210,000^{‡}
Portugal (AFP)	Gold	3,500^{‡}
Spain (Promusicae)	Gold	50,000^{^}
United Kingdom (BPI)	17× Platinum	5,100,000^{‡}
United States (RIAA)	21× Platinum	21,000,000^{‡}
Summaries
Worldwide	—	40,000,000
^{*} Sales figures based on certification alone.^{^} Shipments figures based on certification alone.^{‡} Sales+streaming figures based on certification alone.

Certifications for Classic Albums: Rumours
Region	Certification	Certified units/sales
Australia (ARIA)	2× Platinum	30,000^{^}
New Zealand (RMNZ)	2× Platinum	10,000^{^}
United Kingdom (BPI)	Gold	25,000^{*}
^{*} Sales figures based on certification alone.^{^} Shipments figures based on certification alone.

== See also ==
- List of best-selling albums in Australia
- List of best-selling albums in New Zealand

== Bibliography ==
- Brackett, Donald (2007). Fleetwood Mac: 40 Years of Creative Chaos. Greenwood Publishing Group. ISBN 978-0-275-99338-2.
- Brunning, Bob (2004). The Fleetwood Mac Story: Rumours and Lies. Omnibus Press. ISBN 1-84449-011-4.
- Caillat, Ken & Stiefel, Steven (2012). Making Rumours: The Inside Story of the Classic Fleetwood Mac Album. John Wiley & Sons, Inc. ISBN 978-1-118-21808-2.
- Fleetwood Mac; Ken Caillat; Richard Dashut (2004). Classic Albums – Fleetwood Mac: Rumours (DVD). Eagle Rock Entertainment.
- Rooksby, Rikky (2005). Fleetwood Mac: The Complete Guide to Their Music. Omnibus Press. ISBN 1-84449-427-6.
- Fleetwood Mac; Ken Caillat; Richard Dashut (2009). Fleetwood Mac: Don't Stop (documentary). BBC.
