= Colin Reid =

Guitarist from Northern Ireland

- Born: August 1957 (age 69); Belfast, Northern Ireland
- Genres: Acoustic, fingerstyle, folk
- Occupations: Guitarist, composer
- Instrument: Acoustic guitar
- Years active: 1997–present
- Label: Topic Records

Colin Reid is a guitarist and composer from Belfast, Northern Ireland. He launched his solo career in 1997 after supporting performances with musicians such as Waterson–Carthy, Bert Jansch, Leo Kotke and John Cale.

His eponymous debut album was released by Shetland's Veesik Records in 1999.

He has since released Tilt (2001), (Topic Records) and Swim (2003)(Topic Records). He played in Eddi Reader's band between 2001 and 2005, performing at Cambridge Folk Festival, Celtic Connections, and toured Japan, USA, Canada, Hong Kong, France, Germany, Spain, The Basque Region, UK and Ireland.

In 2000 he received a New Voices commission from the Celtic Connections festival.

In 2001 he adapted Flann O'Brien's The Third Policeman for narrator and strings, and gave performances at the Glasgow Royal Concert Hall, Belfast Festival at Queen's, Dublin Literary Festival, CQAF. The show featured Reid on piano and cellists Neil Martin and David McCann, Oscar nominated actor Stephen Rea, and Dublin actor Phelim Drew and has ongoing performances.

Music can be heard at -

Soundcloud
