= Never Going Back Again =

Song by Fleetwood Mac

from the album Rumours
- A-side: "Don't Stop" (US); "You Make Loving Fun" (UK)
- Released: July 1977
- Recorded: 1976
- Studio: Sound City Studios in Van Nuys, Los Angeles
- Genre: Folk rock
- Length: 2:02
- Label: Warner Bros.
- Songwriter: Lindsey Buckingham
- Producers: Fleetwood Mac, Richard Dashut & Ken Caillat

"Never Going Back Again" is a song written by Lindsey Buckingham that was first released by the British-American rock band Fleetwood Mac on their eleventh studio album Rumours (1977). The song was also released as the B-side to the top-ten single "Don't Stop" in the US and the "You Make Loving Fun" single in the UK. It was also the B-side of "Dreams" in the Netherlands. "Never Going Back Again" has been covered by other artists, including Colin Reid and Matchbox Twenty.

== Background and composition ==
"Never Going Back Again" is one of several songs on Rumours that Buckingham wrote in the wake of the breakup of his relationship with fellow Fleetwood Mac member Stevie Nicks. Buckingham recalls it being one of the last songs written for the album, after he had started a rebound relationship with another woman. Buckingham regards it as a sweet and naive song and does not consider the lyrics to be very deep. The song reflects a desire not to repeat previous mistakes.

Lyrically, it was a bit naive, because it was obviously about Stevie. By the time I wrote that, we'd had a few ups and downs, and she'd moved away from me more than once and come back. It was about Stevie, and it was also about meeting somebody else. It seemed to reaffirm that there was life after that, and yet, you create this illusion of 'I was down once or twice, but I'm never going back to that again.' Which is not really the way it works.

— Lindsey Buckingham

"Never Going Back Again" is set in a 4/4 signature at a moderate tempo of 88 beats per minute, in the key of F sharp major. Buckingham's guitar is in drop D tuning with a capo on the fourth fret. Buckingham's voice spans from a C#3 to A#4.

== Recording ==
"Never Going Back Again" consists of an acoustic guitar and vocals, both of which are performed by Buckingham. He played the acoustic guitar using a Travis picking technique and drew inspiration from the work of Ry Cooder. Buckingham wanted to orchestrate the song with a single acoustic guitar that could "carry the track in total." To capture the optimal sound, producer Ken Caillat suggested that Buckingham's acoustic guitar be restrung every 20 minutes. Caillat pitied the guitar tech's job of restringing the acoustic guitar three times an hour for "the entire day", but approved of Buckingham's "magnificent" instrumental passages. When Buckingham was overdubbing his vocals, he realized that the acoustic guitar parts were in the wrong key, so he recorded the song from scratch the following day.

The working title for the song was "Brushes" because it was originally recorded with just Buckingham playing acoustic guitar and fellow band member Mick Fleetwood playing a snare drum using drum brushes. In the song's final release, the snare drum was removed. The initial backing track consisted of two acoustic guitars, with one playing harmonics and the other handling the solo. Caillat recalled that song sounded "strong" with the single guitar and the vocals when conducting the stereo mix of "Never Going Back Again", so the extra instrumentation was cut. The drums and lead guitar parts that went unused on the original release were restored and included as a bonus track for the DVD-audio release of Rumours. The alternate mix, created by Caillat, was received well by Fleetwood, who encouraged Caillat to place "Brushes" in the running order for the 2004 remaster of Rumours. Caillat also played the mix for Buckingham, who was also pleased with the inclusion of the snare drum and lead guitar, having forgotten that they were ever recorded for "Never Going Back Again". According to Billboard reviewer Christopher Walsh, these parts represent "a pleasant surprise that adds to the song's emotional punch." Another alternate mix of "Never Going Back Again" was found on the 35th anniversary deluxe edition of Rumours, which featured Nicks singing duet vocals with Buckingham.

== Critical reception and legacy ==
Rolling Stone critic John Swenson described "Never Going Back Again" as "the prettiest thing on [Rumours]", saying that the "delightful" vocal "belies the bad-news subject matter." Stylus Magazine critic Patrick McKay regards it as one of the "strongest tracks" on Rumours. Spin critic Chuck Eddy described "Never Going Back Again" as "an arty trance", and Fleetwood Mac biographer Cath Carroll praises "Never Going Back Again" as "a melodically uncluttered song with a simple chorus and a sharp resolve that says everything in a few elegant phrases." Music historian George Case described "Never Going Back Again" as a "gorgeous" song with "bubbly SoCal philosophies about relationships." Andrew Unterberger of Billboard placed "Never Going Back Again" number five on their list ranking every track on Rumours, referring to it as "a masterfully finger-picked Buckingham solo piece" that was one of the album's "most complete" songs.

"Never Going Back Again" has appeared on several Fleetwood Mac compilation albums, including 25 Years – The Chain (1992), The Very Best of Fleetwood Mac (2002) and 50 Years – Don't Stop (2018). The song has also appeared on several live albums. Buckingham has performed the song live both solo and with Fleetwood Mac. During his tour promoting Out of the Cradle, Buckingham included the song during one of his acoustic portions of the set. In a 2023 interview with Omar Apollo, Buckingham stated that the song experienced various permutations since it first appeared on Rumours. He has occasionally included the lyric "I've been down three times" for live performances, which was not part of the original studio recording.

== Personnel ==
- Lindsey Buckingham – acoustic guitar, vocals

== Charts ==
Chart (2011)	Peak position
US Rock Digital Songs (Billboard)	35

== Certifications ==
Region	Certification	Certified units/sales
United Kingdom (BPI)	Platinum	600,000^{‡}
^{‡} Sales+streaming figures based on certification alone.

== Cover versions ==
Matchbox Twenty covered "Never Going Back Again" on Legacy: A Tribute to Fleetwood Mac's Rumours. The Matchbox Twenty version is set in a minor key. Billboard Magazine critic Steve Knopper describes this version as "gloomy." Billboard writer Chuck Taylor describes this version as updating the original version's "unassuming demeanor with a subtly aggressive chug-along rock pulse." According to Matchbox Twenty drummer Paul Doucette, the band intended to play around with the song before coming up with their dark interpretation of what Doucette calls "a sad record when you think about it." Doucette felt that the version they came up with "turned out great." Matchbox Twenty lead vocalist Rob Thomas stated that "we took drums from 'Tusk' and put them in there and at the end, turned it into 'The Chain.' We used all minor chords and made it real brooding."

Guitarist Colin Reid covered "Never Going Back Again" on his 2001 album Tilt, with Eddi Reader providing the vocals. AllMusic critic Ronnie D. Lankford Jr. described this version as "lovely," stating that it "offer[s] a fresh take on a perhaps overplayed classic."

The guitar part from "Never Going Back Again" was used (albeit in a lower key than in the Fleetwood Mac version) in a 2014 television commercial for Bank of America.

Danish experimental pop band Slaraffenland covered "Never Going Back Again", inserting free-form jazz figures and changing the instrumentation while keeping the "sunny" sound of the original.
