= Don't Stop (Fleetwood Mac song) =

1977 single by Fleetwood Mac

- US vinyl single

Single by Fleetwood Mac

from the album Rumours
- B-side: "Gold Dust Woman" (UK); "Never Going Back Again" (US)
- Released: April 1977 (UK); June 1977 (US)
- Recorded: 1976
- Genre: Pop rock
- Length: 3:13
- Label: Warner Bros.
- Songwriter: Christine McVie
- Producers: Fleetwood Mac; Richard Dashut; Ken Caillat

Fleetwood Mac singles chronology
"Dreams" (1977)	"Don't Stop" (1977)	"You Make Loving Fun" (1977)

Music video
- "Don't Stop" on YouTube

"Don't Stop" is a song by the British-American rock band Fleetwood Mac, written by Christine McVie. The song was sung by Lindsey Buckingham and McVie, and was released as a single from the band's album Rumours (1977).

One of the band's most enduring hits, "Don't Stop" was released as the second single from Rumours in the United Kingdom in April 1977, peaking at No. 32, while in the US it followed "Dreams" as the third single from the album in June, eventually peaking at No. 3 at Billboard Hot 100 in September.

== Music and concept ==
"Don't Stop" is a pop rock song. It reflects Christine McVie's feelings after her separation from Fleetwood Mac's bass guitarist, John McVie, after eight years of marriage. McVie noted in The Fleetwood Mac Story: Rumours and Lies, that "Don't Stop" was directed towards her ex-husband John McVie, who was unaware of the song's subject matter until its release. "I've been playing it for years and it wasn't until somebody told me, 'Chris wrote that about you.' Oh really?"

The song was originally tracked with drums, bass, electric guitar, and electric piano on 16 March 1976. Its working title was "Yesterday's Gone", although Christine McVie changed the title to "Don't Stop" a few weeks later after she asked Buckingham to sing the song as a duet. Fleetwood Mac producer Ken Caillat recalled that the decision to sing the song as a duet "improved things dramatically". Take 25 was deemed satisfactory and used as the master.

Following the completion of the basic tracks at the Record Plant in Sausalito, California, the band relocated to Los Angeles for additional overdubs. By this point, "Don't Stop" only lacked the final lead vocal take, although McVie and Buckingham thought that the song was not in a suitable key, so all of the instrumentation was scrapped with the exception of the drums.

On 9 August, McVie replaced the electric piano with a tack piano, an instrument with metal thumb tacks attached to the hammers. Caillat described the decision to add a tack piano as a "breakthrough" that "made the song bounce along". During the same recording session, Buckingham overdubbed an "up-strumming syncopated electric guitar part, along with some lead licks" and also doubled his vocals with McVie, which allowed for the backing tracks to be pushed up in the mix. In Caillat's estimation, this provided the song with "a new range of dynamic energy".

Caillat commented that he was never fond of "Don't Stop", citing grievances with the tempo and the sound of the drums, (Note: Caillat thought that the song was too slow and told Recording Engineer/Producer magazine that "without looking at the faders, you could not tell the difference between the kick and the snare.") but he stated that Christine McVie still loved the song. He was more complimentary of the band's backing vocals after the song's final chorus. "The band kept changing their background vocals. Anytime I thought I knew what they'd sing, they'd do something different. That's a hallmark of classic Fleetwood Mac, their backgrounds. They're incredible singers."

== Reception ==
Cash Box said that "Mick Fleetwood and John McVie comprise a deadly rhythm section, especially when they're working with a straight ahead shuffle like this one." The Guardian and Paste ranked the song number four and number 25 respectively on their lists of the 30 greatest Fleetwood Mac songs. The Guardian wrote that the song's "cantering rhythm and chorus are so impossibly, infectiously buoyant, the song so flawless, that it cancels out the unhappiness that provoked it".

== Political usage ==
The song was the theme music for United States presidential candidate Bill Clinton's 1992 presidential campaign, and was played at the 1992 Democratic National Convention during its final night balloon drop. Upon winning the election, Clinton persuaded the group to perform the song for his inaugural ball in 1993. Some of Clinton's staff attempted to convince him to pick a more contemporary song; Garth Brooks' "We Shall Be Free" was briefly considered, although Clinton ultimately settled on "Don't Stop" because he approved of its message. In the aftermath of the 1993 performance, Fleetwood Mac's Greatest Hits album jumped from number 30 to number 11 on the Catalog Albums Chart.

At the 2000 convention, Clinton ended his speech by saying, "Keep putting people first. Keep building those bridges. And don't stop thinking about tomorrow!" Immediately after the final sentence, the song began playing over the loudspeakers. The song was also played for Clinton's appearances at the 2004, 2008, 2012, 2016, and 2024 conventions.

Additionally, the song was played at Conservative Conferences during David Cameron's tenure as party leader.

== Personnel ==
- Christine McVie – piano, tack piano, Vox Continental organ, lead vocals (2nd verse)
- Mick Fleetwood – drums, tambourine
- John McVie – bass guitar
- Lindsey Buckingham – electric guitars, lead vocals (1st verse)
- Stevie Nicks – backing vocals

== Charts ==
=== Weekly charts ===
Chart (1977–1978)	Peak position
Australia Kent Music Report	30
Belgium (Ultratop 50 Flanders)	6
Belgium (Ultratop 50 Wallonia)	18
Canada RPM Top Singles	1
Netherlands (Dutch Top 40)	5
Netherlands (Single Top 100)	4
UK Singles (Official Charts)	32
US Billboard Hot 100	3
US Adult Contemporary (Billboard)	22
US Cash Box Top 100	1
US Record World Singles	3
West Germany (GfK)	41

=== Year-end charts ===
Chart (1977)	Position
Belgium (Ultratop Flanders)	65
Canada	16
Netherlands (Dutch Top 40)	81
Netherlands (Single Top 100)	76
US Billboard Hot 100	52
US Cash Box Top 100	55

== Certifications ==
Region	Certification	Certified units/sales
New Zealand (RMNZ)	4× Platinum	120,000^{‡}
United Kingdom (BPI)	2× Platinum	1,200,000^{‡}
^{‡} Sales+streaming figures based on certification alone.
