= Oh Daddy (Fleetwood Mac song) =

Song by Fleetwood Mac

from the album Rumours
- Released: 1977
- Recorded: 1976
- Length: 3:56
- Label: Warner Bros.
- Songwriter: Christine McVie
- Producers: Fleetwood Mac, Ken Caillat, Richard Dashut

"Oh Daddy" is a song written by Christine McVie that was first performed by the British-American rock band Fleetwood Mac as the tenth song off their 1977 album Rumours.

The song was played throughout the band's Rumours and Tusk world tours, and resurfaced for the 1997 The Dance tour before disappearing once again.

== Background ==
Christine McVie stated in a series of 1977 interviews that she wrote the song about Mick Fleetwood's separation from his erstwhile wife, Jenny Boyd. At the time, Fleetwood was the only father in the band, with two daughters.

Producer Ken Caillat described "Oh Daddy" as "a beautiful, airy song." He noted that getting the proper tempo was particularly tricky since it sounded rushed at a quicker tempo but lethargic at a slower pace. Fleetwood Mac biographer Cath Carroll praised McVie's vocal and likened the song to a "sexy, old English version of The Rolling Stones' 'Fool to Cry'." Nicks assisted with the lyric 'And I can't walk away from you baby if I tried." In 2012, Fleetwood listed "Oh Daddy" as one of his 11 greatest recordings.

== Production ==
During the Rumours sessions, the band jokingly referred to the song as 'Addy' due to a technical mishap. Caillat had made the mistake while playing back a take. "We were going to do some overdubs, and while rewinding the tape, a portable tape oscillator fell on the machine, sending it into free-wheel – the reels were spinning out of control. I jumped on the machine to stop it - and snapped the tape! Oh, man... [laughs] We listened back and there it was: 'Oh 'addy.' The 'D' part of Christine's vocal was cut off. My heart sunk."

Early on in the recording process, Caillat applied a delay effect onto the song to give the musicians a better understanding of what the song would sound like with audio effects. Near the end of one take, Christine McVie played random notes on her keyboard to grab the attention of the engineers in the control room. The band opted to keep these unplanned additions in the final version of the song.

The band also utilized a $40,000 nine-foot Bösendorfer grand piano at Davlen Studios in North Hollywood. Caillat described the instrument as having "great action but also a dark quality". To achieve a brighter tone from the piano, Caillat used some tube U-47 microphones and applied some EQ to the instrument. McVie held down the piano's sustain pedal and played whole notes on beat 1 of the verses to create a "dramatic" effect. To extend the duration of the chords even longer, Caillat gradually increased the sensitivity of the microphones so that the chord would ring for 20-30 seconds.

For the electric guitar parts, Buckingham played a Fender Stratocaster that was connected through a Leslie speaker and a volume pedal. Caillat also put the guitar signal through a device developed by Rick Turner called the Stratoblaster, which increased the volume of the instrument by several decibels. The electric guitars were treated with reverb and delay. Buckingham also accentuated certain passages with some harmonics on an acoustic guitar.

== Critical reception ==
Pitchfork critic Jessica Hopper described "Oh Daddy" as a melancholic song "that ultimately maintains its dignity." Andrew Unterberger of Billboard placed the song tenth out of eleven on their list ranking every track on Rumours. He believed that the song's "gorgeously windswept production" created some "chilling moments" but felt that the lyrics and melody were not particularly strong. Rolling Stone ranked the song 35th on its list of the top 50 greatest Fleetwood Mac songs.

== Personnel ==
- Christine McVie – piano, Hammond B3, Moog, lead vocals
- Mick Fleetwood – drums, castanets, gong
- John McVie – bass guitar
- Lindsey Buckingham – acoustic guitars, electric guitars, backing vocals
- Stevie Nicks – backing vocals
