= You Make Loving Fun =

1977 single by Fleetwood Mac

Single by Fleetwood Mac

from the album Rumours
- B-side: "Gold Dust Woman" (US) "Never Going Back Again" (UK) "The Chain" (EU)
- Released: September 1977
- Recorded: 1976
- Genre: Pop rock; soft rock; country rock; funk
- Length: 3:36
- Label: Warner Bros.
- Songwriter: Christine McVie
- Producers: Fleetwood Mac; Richard Dashut; Ken Caillat

Fleetwood Mac US singles chronology
"Don't Stop" (1977)	"You Make Loving Fun" (1977)	"Tusk" (1979)

Audio video
- "You Make Loving Fun (2004 Remaster)" on YouTube

"You Make Loving Fun" is a song by the British-American rock band Fleetwood Mac, written and sung by Christine McVie. It was released as the fourth and final single from the band's 1977 album Rumours. "You Make Loving Fun" peaked at number 9 on the US Billboard Hot 100 to become the album's fourth Top 10 hit.

== Background ==
"You Make Loving Fun" was inspired by Christine McVie's affair with the band's lighting director, Curry Grant. "To avoid flare-ups", she told her then-husband and fellow band member, John McVie, that the song was about her dog. The song uses descending seconds in its chord progression. In an interview with the New York Post, McVie remarked that she wanted it to be the third US single from the album, but "Don't Stop" was chosen instead.

Early tracking of the song was done, according to Christine McVie, in the absence of Lindsey Buckingham, which gave her the freedom to "build the song on [her] own". For the February 8 session, Fleetwood was on drums, Stevie Nicks played the tambourine, and Christine McVie played a Rhodes piano that was sent through a Stratoblaster, which boosted the instrument's output by 15 decibels. John McVie's bass was re-recorded, and Christine McVie overdubbed a Hohner Clavinet, which was fed through a wah-wah pedal. McVie struggled to play the clavinet in tandem with the wah-wah pedal, so Fleetwood got on the floor and operated the pedal with his hands while McVie played the keys of the clavinet. Buckingham arrived at the studio in the late afternoon and chose to play a Gibson Les Paul for the rhythm guitar parts, which was plugged into a rotating Leslie speaker. A Hammond organ was also overdubbed during the recording session, which lasted until six in the evening.

Buckingham wanted accented tom-tom beats in the chorus, but Fleetwood was unwilling to try this idea. Instead, Buckingham played the instrument himself. Producer Ken Caillat remarked that "Lindsey was the accent king. He could accent with guitars, he could accent with toms [and] he could accent with Naugahyde chairs."

During the tracking of the backing vocals, Caillat recalled that Nicks and Buckingham were engaged in "vicious name calling": "The tape would start rolling and they’d sing, 'Yooooooou make loving fun,' just beautiful, two little angels. The tape would stop and they’d be calling each other names again. They didn't miss a beat."

When preparing the 5.1 surround sound mix for Rumours in 2001, "You Make Loving Fun" was one of the songs that Caillat showcased at the Surround 2001 International Conference and Technology Showcase. Commenting on the mix, Billboard said that "hearing 'You Make Living Fun' in 5.1 is like hearing another song altogether", adding that it was "a far more emotional and engrossing experience."

== Critical reception ==
Cash Box said McVie's "magical words are complemented by angelic backing vocals, strident guitar melodies, and the pulsating backbeat reinforced by her own electric keyboard." Record World called it a "light rocker with a compelling love lyric." Writing for Rolling Stone, John Swenson compared the song structure to some of the musical output from The Byrds, specifically referencing the "sparse instrumental background and the chorus comes on like an angelic choir." He also praised the vocals, saying that McVie sounded "vital" and noting the harmonies working in tandem with the counterpoint guitar during the chorus. Rob Brunner of Entertainment Weekly selected "You Make Loving Fun" as a highlight on the album and said that it "benefits from relative underexposure."

The Guardian and Paste ranked the song number 13 and number 14 respectively on their lists of the 30 greatest Fleetwood Mac songs. Andrew Unterberger of Billboard placed the song number 2 on their list ranking every song on Rumours, saying that it was the album's "secret weapon".

== Live performances ==
"You Make Loving Fun" was a concert staple for Fleetwood Mac and was played during every tour that included Christine McVie from 1976 until 1997, a year before McVie's departure from the band and retirement from touring. However, the song was revived for Fleetwood Mac's 2014–2015 On with the Show tour when McVie rejoined the band, as well as their 2018-2019 An Evening with Fleetwood Mac tour with new members Mike Campbell and Neil Finn. A live recording of "You Make Loving Fun" from their 21 October 1982 performance at The Forum in Los Angeles was included on their 2024 Mirage Tour '82 live album.

== Personnel ==
- Christine McVie – lead vocals, electric piano, clavinet, Hammond B3 organ
- Mick Fleetwood – drums, wind chimes, castanets, tambourine
- John McVie – bass guitar
- Lindsey Buckingham – guitars, tom toms, backing vocals
- Stevie Nicks – backing vocals

== Charts ==
=== Weekly charts ===
Chart (1977–1978)	Peak position
Australia (Kent Music Report)	65
Canada Top Singles (RPM)	7
Netherlands (Dutch Top 40)	27
Netherlands (Single Top 100)	22
New Zealand (Recorded Music NZ)	26
UK Singles (Official Charts)	45
US Billboard Hot 100	9
US Adult Contemporary (Billboard)	28
US Cash Box Top 100	7
US Record World Singles	8

=== Year-end charts ===
Chart (1977)	Rank
Canada Top Singles (RPM)	100
US (Joel Whitburn's Pop Annual)	78

Chart (1978)	Rank
US Cash Box Top 100	100

== Certifications ==
Region	Certification	Certified units/sales
United Kingdom (BPI)	Platinum	600,000^{‡}
^{‡} Sales+streaming figures based on certification alone.

== Cover versions ==
In March 2024, the American country band Lonestar covered "You Make Loving Fun" in a country rock style, as a tribute to Christine McVie who died in 2022. Mick Fleetwood praised their version, saying "Christine will be smiling!"

As part of the Mick Fleetwood-produced 20th anniversary tribute album Legacy: A Tribute to Fleetwood Mac's Rumours, the song was covered in 2024 by American singer-songwriter Jewel.
