= Fleetwood Mac Tour =

1975–76 concert tour by Fleetwood Mac

- Tour by Fleetwood Mac
- Layout used for the concert posters
- Associated album: Fleetwood Mac
- Start date: May 15, 1975
- End date: August 30, 1976
- Legs: 4
- No. of shows: 128

Fleetwood Mac concert chronology
- Heroes Are Hard to Find Tour (1974); Fleetwood Mac Tour (1975–76); Rumours Tour (1977–78)

The Fleetwood Mac Tour was a concert tour promoting the band's lineup of Lindsey Buckingham on guitar and vocals and Stevie Nicks on vocals. The band initially conducted a series of performances beginning in May 1975 to familiarize the public with the new lineup, with their first occurring in El Paso, Texas. The band's record company had some reservations about the decision to tour without an accompanying album, which was not due for release until July 1975. The setlist comprised a mixture of songs from the upcoming album and material predating the tenure of Buckingham and Nicks, including "Oh Well" and "Station Man".

After the conclusion of their initial tour, which ended in June, the band took a break from touring to finish their tenth album, which was released under the name Fleetwood Mac in July 1975. Once the album was completed, the band booked a lengthier tour for the remainder of 1975.

== Set list ==
=== 1975 setlist ===
1. "Get Like You Used to Be" (Chicken Shack cover)
2. "Station Man"
3. "Spare Me a Little of Your Love"
4. "Rhiannon"
5. "Monday Morning"
6. "Why"
7. "Landslide"
8. "Crystal"
9. "Frozen Love" (Buckingham Nicks cover)
10. "Over My Head"
11. "Say You Love Me"
12. "I'm So Afraid"
13. "Oh Well"
14. "The Green Manalishi (with the Two Pronged Crown)"
15. "World Turning"
16. "Blue Letter"
  Encore
17. "Don't Let Me Down Again" (Buckingham Nicks cover)
18. "Hypnotized"
- "Jumping at Shadows" and "Sunny Side of Heaven" were performed at least once on this leg of the tour(Day on the Green 8-3-75).

=== 1976 setlist ===
1. "Sunny Side of Heaven"
2. "Spare Me a Little of Your Love"
3. "Rhiannon"
4. "Monday Morning"
5. "Why"
6. "Landslide"
7. "Over My Head"
8. "Say You Love Me"
9. "Silver Springs"
10. "You Make Loving Fun"
11. "I'm So Afraid"
12. "Oh Well"
13. "World Turning"
14. "Blue Letter"
  Encore
15. "Don't Let Me Down Again" (Buckingham Nicks cover)
16. "Hypnotized"

== Tour dates ==
Date	City	Country	Venue
First leg
May 15, 1975	El Paso	United States	El Paso County Coliseum
May 16, 1975	Amarillo	United States	Amarillo Civic Center
May 17, 1975	Abilene	United States	Taylor County Coliseum
May 18, 1975	Dallas	United States	Dallas Memorial Auditorium
May 19, 1975	San Antonio	United States	San Antonio Municipal Auditorium
May 21, 1975	Austin	United States	Austin Municipal Auditorium
May 22, 1975	Detroit	United States	Majestic Theater
May 23, 1975	Akron	United States	Akron Civic Theatre
May 24, 1975	Evansville	United States	Soldiers and Sailors Memorial Coliseum
May 25, 1975	South Bend	United States	C. Morris Civic Auditorium
May 27, 1975	Oxford	United States	Millet Hall
May 29, 1975	Upper Darby Township	United States	Tower Theater
May 30, 1975	Port Chester	United States	Capitol Theatre
May 31, 1975	Richmond	United States	The Mosque
June 1, 1975	Washington, D.C.	United States	DAR Constitution Hall
June 3, 1975	Pittsburgh	United States	Stanley Theatre
June 4, 1975	Trenton	United States	Trenton War Memorial
June 5, 1975	Buffalo	United States	New Century Theatre
June 6, 1975	Hempstead	United States	Calderone Concert Hall
June 7, 1975	Passaic	United States	Capitol Theatre
June 8, 1975	Waterbury	United States	Palace Theatre
Second leg
July 25, 1975	Houston	United States	Houston Music Hall
July 26, 1975	New Orleans	United States	Tad Gormley Stadium
August 1, 1975	San Bernardino	United States	Swing Auditorium
August 3, 1975 (Note: The concert on August 3, 1975 was a part of Day on the Green.)	Oakland	United States	Oakland–Alameda County Coliseum
August 7, 1975	Vancouver	Canada	Pacific Coliseum
August 8, 1975	Seattle	United States	Paramount Theatre
August 9, 1975	Portland	United States	Paramount Theatre
August 10, 1975	Missoula	United States	Adams Fieldhouse
August 11, 1975	Lethbridge	Canada	Lethbridge Sportsplex
August 13, 1975	Calgary	Canada	Stampede Grandstand
August 15, 1975	Milwaukee	United States	MECCA Arena
August 17, 1975 (Note: The concert on August 17, 1975 was a part of Summer Jam.)	Kansas City	United States	Royals Stadium
August 18, 1975	St. Louis	United States	Ambassador Theatre
August 19, 1975	St. Louis	United States	Ambassador Theatre
August 20, 1975	Salt Lake City	United States	Terrace Ballroom
August 22, 1975	Albuquerque	United States	Albuquerque Civic Auditorium
August 23, 1975	Flagstaff	United States	Northern Arizona University Hall
August 24, 1975	Phoenix	United States	Celebrity Theatre
August 26, 1975	Tucson	United States	Tucson Convention Center
August 29, 1975	Modesto	United States	Olympic Gold Ice Arena
August 30, 1975	Anaheim	United States	Anaheim Stadium
August 31, 1975	San Diego	United States	Balboa Stadium
September 1, 1975	Fresno	United States	Madera Speedway
September 12, 1975	Denver	United States	McNichols Sports Arena
September 14, 1975	Casper	United States	Central Wyoming Fairgrounds
September 16, 1975	Lincoln	United States	Pershing Auditorium
September 17, 1975	Madison	United States	Veterans Memorial Coliseum
September 18, 1975	Chicago	United States	Auditorium Theatre
September 19, 1975	Carbondale	United States	SIU Arena
September 20, 1975	West Lafayette	United States	Elliott Hall of Music
September 21, 1975	Cincinnati	United States	Edgewater Speedway; Miami River Music Festival
September 23, 1975	La Crosse	United States	Mary E. Sawyer Auditorium
September 24, 1975	Davenport	United States	Orpheum Theater
September 25, 1975	Champaign	United States	Assembly Hall
September 26, 1975	Kent	United States	Student Center Ballroom
September 27, 1975	Detroit	United States	Michigan Theatre
September 29, 1975	Columbus	United States	Veterans Memorial Auditorium
October 3, 1975	Hampton	United States	Hampton Coliseum
October 4, 1975	Richmond	United States	Richmond Coliseum
October 5, 1975	Largo	United States	Capital Centre
October 8, 1975	Rochester	United States	Rochester Community War Memorial
October 9, 1975	Buffalo	United States	New Century Theatre
October 10, 1975	Uniondale	United States	Nassau Veterans Memorial Coliseum
October 11, 1975	Philadelphia	United States	The Spectrum
October 12, 1975	Slippery Rock	United States	Slippery Rock Fieldhouse
October 13, 1975	South Orange	United States	South Orange Performing Arts Center
October 14, 1975	Syracuse	United States	Loew's State Theatre
October 15, 1975	Pittsburgh	United States	Civic Arena
October 16, 1975	Erie	United States	Erie County Field House
October 17, 1975	Passaic	United States	Capitol Theatre
October 18, 1975	Boston	United States	Boston Garden
October 20, 1975	New Haven	United States	New Haven Coliseum
October 23, 1975	Wallingford, CT	United States	Trod Nossel Studios (radio concert)
October 24, 1975	Hamilton	United States	Reid Athletic Center
October 25, 1975	Storrs	United States	Jorgensen Auditorium
October 26, 1975	New York City	United States	Beacon Theatre
Third leg
November 12, 1975	Birmingham	United States	Boutwell Auditorium
November 13, 1975	Knoxville	United States	Civic Colliseum
November 14, 1975	Atlanta	United States	Fox Theater
November 15, 1975	Charleston	United States	Municipal Auditorium
November 18, 1975	Chapel Hill	United States	Carmichael Auditorium
November 19, 1975	Wilson	United States	Atlantic Christian College
November 20, 1975	Winston-Salem	United States	Wake Forest University Fieldhouse
November 21, 1975	Morgantown	United States	West Virginia University Coliseum
November 22, 1975	Harrisonburg	United States	Godwin Hall
November 26, 1975	Santa Monica	United States	Santa Monica Civic Auditorium
November 27, 1975	San Francisco	United States	Winterland Ballroom
November 28, 1975	San Francisco	United States	Winterland Ballroom
November 29, 1975	San Francisco	United States	Winterland Ballroom
November 30, 1975	San Jose	United States	San Jose Civic Auditorium
December 2, 1975	Sacramento	United States	Sacramento Memorial Auditorium
December 3, 1975	Houston	United States	Houston Music Hall
December 6, 1975	New Orleans	United States	The Warehouse
December 10, 1975	Tucson	United States	Tucson Convention Center
December 11, 1975	Denver	United States	Denver Convention Center
December 12, 1975	Phoenix	United States	Phoenix Civic Plaza
December 18, 1975	Bakersfield	United States	Bakersfield Civic Auditorium
December 19, 1975	Inglewood	United States	The Forum
December 20, 1975	San Diego	United States	San Diego Sports Arena
Summer Tour '76
May 1, 1976 (Note: The concert on May 1, 1976 was a part of Day on the Green.)	Oakland	United States	Oakland–Alameda County Coliseum
May 3, 1976	Santa Barbara	United States	Campus Stadium, UCSB
June 18, 1976 (Note: The concert on June 18, 1976 was a part of Summer Jam.)	Kansas City	United States	Royals Stadium
June 19, 1976	Omaha	United States	Omaha Civic Auditorium
June 20, 1976	Des Moines	United States	Iowa State Fairgrounds
June 21, 1976	Clarkston	United States	Pine Knob Music Theatre
June 22, 1976	Clarkston	United States	Pine Knob Music Theatre
June 24, 1976	Milwaukee	United States	MECCA Arena
June 25, 1976	Peoria, IL	United States	Glen Oak Park
June 26, 1976	Minneapolis Minnesota	United States	Parade Stadium
June 27, 1976	Fargo	United States	North Dakota State University
June 29, 1976	St. Louis	United States	Civic Center Busch Memorial Stadium
June 30, 1976	Cincinnati	United States	Riverfront Stadium
July 2, 1976	Greensboro	United States	Greensboro Coliseum
July 3, 1976	Atlanta	United States	Omni Coliseum
July 4, 1976	Tampa	United States	Tampa Stadium
July 12, 1976	Philadelphia	United States	The Spectrum
July 13, 1976	Syracuse	United States	War Memorial Arena
July 14, 1976	Hartford	United States	Colt Park
July 16, 1976	Green Bay	United States	Brown County Veterans Memorial Arena
July 17, 1976	Madison	United States	Dane County Coliseum
July 18, 1976	Denver	United States	Mile High Stadium
July 23, 1976	Richfield	United States	Richfield Coliseum
July 24, 1976	Pittsburgh	United States	Three Rivers Stadium
July 25, 1976	Foxborough	United States	Schaefer Stadium
July 27, 1976	Landover	United States	Capital Centre
August 24, 1976	San Bernardino	United States	Swing Auditorium
August 26, 1976	San Diego	United States	San Diego Sports Arena
August 27, 1976	Los Angeles	United States	Universal Amphitheatre
August 28, 1976	Los Angeles	United States	Universal Amphitheatre
August 29, 1976	Los Angeles	United States	Universal Amphitheatre
August 30, 1976	Los Angeles	United States	Universal Amphitheatre

=== Box office score data ===
List of box office score data with date, city, venue, attendance, gross
Date (1976)	City	Venue	Attendance	Gross
May 1	Oakland, United States	Oakland–Alameda County Coliseum	57,000 / 57,000	$486,200
June 18	Kansas City, United States	Royals Stadium	39,121 / 39,121	$311,000
June 19	Omaha, United States	Omaha Civic Auditorium	11,000	$72,000
June 24	Milwaukee, United States	MECCA Arena	9,531	$65,380
June 29	St. Louis, United States	Civic Center Busch Memorial Stadium	34,163	$350,400
July 13	Syracuse, United States	War Memorial Arena	6,571	$39,816
July 14	Hartford, United States	Colt Park	21,139	$166,886
July 16	Green Bay, United States	Brown County Veterans Memorial Arena	5,074	$32,352
July 17	Madison, United States	Dane County Coliseum	10,100 / 10,100	$61,701
July 18	Denver, United States	Mile High Stadium	62,000 / 62,000	$496,000
July 24	Pittsburgh, United States	Three Rivers Stadium	37,500	$375,000
July 25	Foxborough, United States	Schaefer Stadium	64,791 / 64,791	$588,687
July 27	Landover, United States	Capital Centre	18,787 / 18,787	$123,876
August 26	San Diego, United States	San Diego Sports Arena	11,500	$79,500
TOTAL			388,277	$3,248,798

== Personnel ==
- Mick Fleetwood – drums, congas, cowbell, gong, talking drum
- John McVie – bass guitar
- Christine McVie – hammond B3-organ, piano, solina string ensemble, hohner pianet, maracas, vocals
- Lindsey Buckingham – acoustic & electric guitars, vocals
- Stevie Nicks – vocals, tambourine
