= Don't Let Me Down Again =

Single by Buckingham Nicks

from the album Buckingham Nicks
- B-side: Races Are Run (US) "Crystal" (UK)
- Released: November 1973
- Recorded: 1973
- Studio: Sound City Studios, Van Nuys, California
- Length: 3:52 (album version); 3:11 (single edit)
- Label: Polydor
- Songwriter: Lindsey Buckingham
- Producer: Keith Olsen

Buckingham Nicks singles chronology
| "Don't Let Me Down Again" (1973) | "Crying in the Night" (1974) |

"Don't Let Me Down Again" is a song written by Lindsey Buckingham. It was originally included on the 1973 album Buckingham Nicks, an album that Buckingham recorded with his musical and then-romantic partner Stevie Nicks. The song was issued as the album's first single and failed to break the top 100 in any market. After Buckingham and Nicks joined Fleetwood Mac, the band included the song in some of their setlists. The single has been reissued on several occasions, including in 2025 as a digital download.

== Release and critical reception ==
"Don't Let Me Down Again" was recorded with Jerry Scheff on bass and Ron Tutt on drums, both of whom had served as members of Elvis Presley's rhythm section. Buckingham recorded the harmonized guitar break by triple tracking his parts. Nicks referred to the finished recording as "Southern rockabilly with a Celtic twist".

In the United States, "Don't Let Me Down Again" was released as a single on November 2, 1973, with "Races Are Run" as the B-side. Polydor, who distributed the single, took out an ad in Record World promoting the song as "a beautiful single by two beautiful people". Billboard reviewed the single in the November 24, 1973, edition of the magazine and wrote that the "energized vocals and guitar runs push this hip swaying tune. There's an infectious quality to the total production." That same week, Cashbox also reviewed the single, calling it a "steady, driving rocker". They also anticipated that "chart action is certain to follow" in part due to the duo's vocal harmonies, which they believed would make the song "attractive to most pop markets" and result in "a good deal of programming."

The single received some airplay in certain municipalities, including Cleveland, where Kid Leo played the song on WMMS. For the January 5, 1974 edition of Record World, "Don't Let Me Down" charted at number 113. The song did not chart on the US Billboard Hot 100 or any other publication. "Don't Let Me Down Again" was not released in the UK until April 1974, where it was accompanied with "Crystal" as the B-side. Additional reissues of the single were released in 1976 and 1977 with little promotion. After Buckingham and Nicks joined Fleetwood Mac, the band considered the idea of re-recording "Don't Let Me Down Again" for their 1975 Fleetwood Mac album, although the band's drummer Mick Fleetwood ultimately rejected the idea.

On August 11, 2025, a video of a radio playing "Don't Let Me Down Again" was posted on the social media accounts of Buckingham and Nicks, with a caption reading "Wednesday". Two days later, "Don't Let Me Down Again" was released as a digital single and made available on streaming services. Reviewing the re-release of Buckingham Nicks, Hillel Italie of the Associated Press said that the song's "opening gallop and heavy bass" was reminiscent of Buckingham's song "Second Hand News". Piers Martin of Uncut highlighted the song's rhythm section that underpinned Buckingham's "ecstatic riffing".

== Live performances ==
When Buckingham Nicks embarked on a tour to promote their album, "Don't Let Me Down Again" was one of the songs included in the band's setlist. In January, after the two agreed to join Fleetwood Mac, the duo played the song during a series of performances in Alabama and Florida, which marked the final shows played under the name Buckingham Nicks. Fleetwood Mac also incorporated the song as an encore for their 1975–1976 Fleetwood Mac Tour. A live recording from one of Fleetwood Mac's performances in Passaic was included on their 1980 Live album.

After Buckingham's departure from Fleetwood Mac in 1987, the band played the song on their Shake the Cage Tour in promotion of the Tango in the Night album. "Don't Let Me Down Again" was performed once in Madison, Wisconsin, for the band's 2003–04 Say You Will Tour. In one of the tour reports published by Lindsey Buckingham's niece, Cory, she mentioned that the band struggled to find a suitable location in the setlist for "Don't Let Me Down Again" and decided to permanently retire it in favor of "Goodbye Baby".

== Shirley Eikhard version ==
In 1977, "Don't Let Me Down Again" was covered by the Canadian singer-songwriter Shirley Eikhard on her Horizons album under the abbreviated title "Don't Let Me Down". The song was released as a single and peaked at number 76 on the RPM Canadian singles chart.

=== Chart performance ===
| Chart (1977) | Peak position |
|---|---|
| Canada RPM Top Singles | 76 |
| Canada RPM Adult Contemporary | 19 |
