= Shake the Cage Tour =

1987–88 concert tour by Fleetwood Mac

- Tour by Fleetwood Mac
- Poster to the concert in Offenburg, West Germany
- Associated album: Tango in the Night
- Start date: September 30, 1987
- End date: June 28, 1988
- Legs: 2
- No. of shows: 69

Fleetwood Mac concert chronology
- Mirage Tour (1982); Shake the Cage Tour (1987–88); Behind the Mask Tour (1990)

The Shake the Cage Tour by the British-American rock band Fleetwood Mac began on September 30, 1987, in Kansas City, Missouri, and ended on June 28, 1988, in Manchester, England. It was their first tour since 1974 without Lindsey Buckingham, who left the band in August 1987.

== History ==
Although the album Tango in the Night included Lindsey Buckingham, the guitarist quit at a band meeting to discuss the tour. Buckingham had agreed to commit to a ten week tour at the insistence of Mo Ostin, which was shorter than the eight months that were originally planned. Buckingham also suggested the addition of multiple touring musicians, including two-three guitarists and percussionists. Buckingham later reneged on his agreement to tour the album and was subsequently summoned to Christine McVie's house to discuss the matter. Following a confrontation between Buckingham and Stevie Nicks, the former left the meeting prematurely and decided to leave the band. "We'd signed the contracts," Nicks noted. "We couldn't call in and say, 'Oh, we can't do the tour.' We had to do it, or Fleetwood Mac would have been sued forever." Buckingham later explained that he was not willing to tour in support of the album due to his belief that the tension that underpinned the Tango in the Night sessions would be amplified on the road. He also claimed that he would have been willing to remain with Fleetwood Mac if they opted not to tour the album.

Buckingham was replaced by rockabilly singer and guitarist Billy Burnette and lead guitarist and session musician Rick Vito. The former contributed to Mick Fleetwood's solo album I'm Not Me, as a member of Mick Fleetwood's Zoo. Vito was an early fan of the band, having first witnessed the band in 1968 at a gig in Philadelphia. He later performed with John McVie in the 1970s on an album with John Mayall and also did session work for Jackson Browne, Bonnie Raitt, and Bob Seger. The band rehearsed in September and embarked on the Shake the Cage Tour later that month. In a 2022 interview with Rolling Stone, Burnette said that the band generally received positive feedback barring a few exceptions, citing a review for their tour in Pittsburgh as one example. Pete Bishop of The Pittsburgh Press mentioned that Burnette was "not Buckingham's equal as a singer" and thought that this detracted from the vocal harmonies on certain songs such as "Go Your Own Way". Burnette recalled seeing a "Lindsey who?" banner on the band's opening night in Kansas City.

The band's setlist included some songs from Peter Green's time with Fleetwood Mac, who was a founding member of the band. Burnette handled lead vocals on "Oh Well" and Vito sang lead on "I Love Another Woman". "Black Magic Woman", which was written by Green, was also considered for the setlist, although John McVie vetoed the idea on the grounds that it was too associated with Santana, who had recorded a cover of the song that eclipsed the original in popularity. "Don't Let Me Down Again" from the 1973 Buckingham Nicks album was also included in the setlist.

Multiple touring musicians augmented the tour, including Lori Perry, Elisecia Wright, and Sharon Celani, who had also served as backing vocalists for Nicks. Isaac Asante, who had previously worked with Fleetwood on his solo album The Visitor in 1981, was also part of the touring lineup.

This tour was filmed during the San Francisco shows (December 12–13) and released on VHS as Fleetwood Mac: Tango in the Night. Cruzados were the opening act of the tour. The band played at the Rock am Ring Festival in Nürburg, West Germany, on June 4, 1988. The crowd in attendance was 80,000.

== Set list ==
1. "Say You Love Me"
2. "The Chain"
3. "Dreams"
4. "Isn't It Midnight"
5. "Everywhere"
6. "Oh Well"
7. "Seven Wonders"
8. "Rattlesnake Shake"
9. "Over My Head"
10. "Gold Dust Woman"
11. "Don't Let Me Down Again" (Buckingham Nicks cover)
12. "Has Anyone Ever Written Anything for You?" (Stevie Nicks song)
13. "I Loved Another Woman"
14. "Brown Eyes"
15. "World Turning"
16. "Little Lies"
17. "Stand Back" (Stevie Nicks song)
18. "You Make Loving Fun"
19. "Go Your Own Way"
  Encore
20. "Blue Letter"
21. "Don't Stop"
22. "Songbird"

== Tour dates ==
Date	City	Country	Venue
North America
September 30, 1987	Kansas City	United States	Kemper Arena
October 1, 1987	Ames	United States	Hilton Coliseum
October 3, 1987	East Troy	United States	Alpine Valley Music Theatre
October 5, 1987	Indianapolis	United States	Market Square Arena
October 6, 1987	Louisville	United States	Freedom Hall
October 8, 1987	Landover	United States	Capital Centre
October 9, 1987	Chapel Hill	United States	Dean Smith Center
October 10, 1987	Clemson	United States	Littlejohn Coliseum
October 13, 1987	Richfield	United States	Richfield Coliseum
October 14, 1987	Pittsburgh	United States	Civic Arena
October 16, 1987	Cincinnati	United States	Riverfront Coliseum
October 17, 1987	Detroit	United States	Joe Louis Arena
October 19, 1987	Toronto	Canada	Maple Leaf Gardens
October 20, 1987	Montréal	Canada	Forum de Montréal
October 23, 1987	Hartford	United States	Hartford Civic Center
October 24, 1987	East Rutherford	United States	Meadowlands Arena
October 25, 1987	Uniondale	United States	Nassau Coliseum
October 28, 1987	Philadelphia	United States	The Spectrum
October 30, 1987	Boston	United States	Boston Garden
October 31, 1987	Boston	United States	Boston Garden
November 1, 1987	Providence	United States	Providence Civic Center
November 4, 1987	Tallahassee	United States	Leon County Civic Center
November 6, 1987	Pembroke Pines	United States	Hollywood Sportatorium
November 7, 1987	Tampa	United States	USF Sun Dome
November 10, 1987	New Orleans	United States	Lakefront Arena
November 12, 1987	Houston	United States	The Summit
November 13, 1987	Austin	United States	Frank Erwin Center
November 15, 1987	Dallas	United States	Reunion Arena
November 17, 1987	Murfreesboro	United States	Murphy Center
November 19, 1987	Rosemont	United States	Rosemont Horizon
November 20, 1987	St. Louis	United States	St. Louis Arena
November 27, 1987	Denver	United States	McNichols Sports Arena
November 28, 1987	Salt Lake City	United States	Salt Palace
December 1, 1987	Austin	United States	Frank Erwin Center
December 3, 1987	Phoenix	United States	Compton Terrace Amphitheatre
December 4, 1987	Paradise	United States	Thomas & Mack Center
December 6, 1987	Inglewood	United States	The Forum
December 7, 1987	Inglewood	United States	The Forum
December 8, 1987	San Diego	United States	San Diego Sports Arena
December 10, 1987	Fresno	United States	Selland Arena
December 12, 1987	San Francisco	United States	Cow Palace
December 13, 1987	San Francisco	United States	Cow Palace
December 17, 1987	Portland	United States	Portland Memorial Coliseum
December 18, 1987	Seattle	United States	Seattle Center Coliseum
Europe
May 14, 1988	Birmingham	England	National Exhibition Centre
May 15, 1988	Birmingham	England	National Exhibition Centre
May 18, 1988	London	England	Wembley Arena
May 19, 1988	London	England	Wembley Arena
May 21, 1988	London	England	Wembley Arena
May 22, 1988	London	England	Wembley Arena
May 24, 1988	London	England	Wembley Arena
May 25, 1988	London	England	Wembley Arena
May 28, 1988	Gothenburg	Sweden	Scandinavium
May 29, 1988	Stockholm	Sweden	Hovet
May 31, 1988	Bad Segeberg	West Germany	Freilichtbühne
June 3, 1988	Nüremberg	West Germany	Frankenhalle
June 4, 1988	Nürburg	West Germany	Nürburgring (Rock am Ring Festival)
June 6, 1988	Munich	West Germany	Olympiastadion
June 9, 1988	West Berlin	West Germany	Waldbühne
June 11, 1988	Dortmund	West Germany	Westfalenhalle
June 12, 1988	Offenburg	West Germany	Ortenauhalle
June 14, 1988	Rotterdam	Netherlands	Rotterdam Ahoy Sportpaleis
June 15, 1988	Rotterdam	Netherlands	Rotterdam Ahoy Sportpaleis
June 18, 1988	London	England	Wembley Arena
June 19, 1988	London	England	Wembley Arena
June 21, 1988	London	England	Wembley Arena
June 25, 1988	Dublin	Ireland	RDS Arena
June 28, 1988	Manchester	England	Maine Road

== Personnel ==
- Mick Fleetwood – drums, percussion
- John McVie – bass guitar
- Christine McVie – Hammond B3 Organ, Yamaha KX88, piano, maracas, vocals
- Rick Vito – lead guitar, vocals
- Billy Burnette – rhythm guitar, vocals
- Stevie Nicks – vocals, tambourine

Additional musicians

- Dan Garfield – keyboards, samples
- Isaac Asanté – percussion
- Lori Perry-Nicks – backing vocals
- Elisecia Wright – backing vocals
- Sharon Celani – backing vocals

== Certifications ==
Region	Certification	Certified units/sales
Australia (ARIA) DVD edition	Platinum	15,000^{^}
^{^} Shipments figures based on certification alone.
