= Warm Ways =

Single by Fleetwood Mac

from the album Fleetwood Mac
- B-side: "Blue Letter" (single version)
- Released: October 1975 (UK)
- Recorded: February 1975
- Genre: Soft rock
- Length: 3:52
- Label: Reprise K 14403
- Songwriter: Christine McVie
- Producers: Fleetwood Mac, Keith Olsen

Fleetwood Mac singles chronology
"Heroes Are Hard to Find" (1974)	"Warm Ways" (1975)	"Over My Head" (1975)

Audio video
- "Warm Ways" on YouTube

"Warm Ways" is a song by the British/American music group Fleetwood Mac. It was included as the second track on the band's 1975 album titled Fleetwood Mac and was one of the four songs on the album solely written and sung by Christine McVie. The song was also issued as a single in the United Kingdom.

== Background ==
During the making of Tusk album, Buckingham borrowed aspects of his guitar playing on "Warm Ways" and repurposed it for "Over & Over", another song written by McVie. Buckingham had played slide guitar on "Warm Ways", a technique that he seldom utilised. Hernan Rojas, who served as the engineer for Tusk, said that Buckingham was reminded of "Warm Ways" when he first heard "Over & Over". These two tracks, along with "Never Forget" from Tusk, are among the few Fleetwood Mac songs to feature Buckingham on slide guitar.

In October 1975, "Warm Ways" was released as the lead single from Fleetwood Mac in the United Kingdom. The following month, "Warm Ways" was listed by Music Week as a Radio One Record of the Week. "Warm Ways" was not released as a single in the United States, where "Over My Head" was issued as the first single instead. The single did not chart in Britain, with only the fourth single from the album, "Say You Love Me" managing to chart upon its original release. Fleetwood Mac rehearsed the song for their Fleetwood Mac Tour, but they never performed it live.

== Critical reception ==
PopMatters wrote that the song "lives up to its title and then some", adding that the music possessed a "wistful" quality. Writing for NPR, Annie Zaleski noted how McVie stretched out the syllables on a few lyrics found in "Warm Ways", which Zaleski said "illuminate[d] the coziness of sleeping by a beloved."

== Personnel ==
- Christine McVie – keyboards, lead vocals
- Lindsey Buckingham – guitars, harmony vocals
- Stevie Nicks – harmony vocals
- John McVie – bass guitar
- Mick Fleetwood – drums
