= An Evening with Fleetwood Mac =

2018–19 concert tour by Fleetwood Mac

- Tour by Fleetwood Mac
- Location: Europe; North America; Oceania
- Start date: October 3, 2018
- End date: November 16, 2019
- Legs: 4
- No. of shows: 88
- Attendance: 1.3 million
- Box office: $172 M

Fleetwood Mac concert chronology
- On with the Show (2014–15); An Evening with Fleetwood Mac (2018–19)

An Evening with Fleetwood Mac was the final concert tour by British-American rock band Fleetwood Mac. The tour's lineup consisted of Stevie Nicks, Christine McVie, Mick Fleetwood, John McVie, Mike Campbell and Neil Finn. The tour marked the only tour with the band for Campbell and Finn, and the first tour without Lindsey Buckingham since the Another Link in the Chain Tour (1994–1995). Comprising 88 shows, it began on October 3, 2018, in Tulsa, and concluded on November 16, 2019, in Las Vegas.

== Background ==
Fleetwood Mac's plans for a worldwide concert tour in 2018 were first revealed by Christine McVie in March 2017, when the tour was initially referred to as a "farewell tour", with plans of having the Rumours lineup (Lindsey Buckingham, Stevie Nicks, Christine McVie, Mick Fleetwood and John McVie) reuniting for another tour for the first time since On with the Show (2014–2015). "The 2018 tour is supposed to be a farewell tour, but you take farewell tours one at a time. Somehow we always come together, this unit. We can feel it ourselves" said Christine McVie. She told The One Show in June 2017 that the band planned to begin rehearsing in March 2018, and begin the global tour in June.

The band announced the An Evening With Fleetwood Mac tour on April 25, 2018, with a leg of 54 concerts across North America, beginning in October 2018. Weeks prior to the tour announcement, the band had announced its separation from longtime vocalist and lead guitarist Lindsey Buckingham. The separation was reportedly due to disagreements concerning the tour. According to Stevie Nicks, the band wanted to begin rehearsals in June 2018 and tour at the end of the year, while Buckingham wanted to put off rehearsals until November 2019. Vocalist/guitarist Neil Finn and guitarist Mike Campbell joined the band after Buckingham's departure. Campbell, who was approached by Fleetwood to join the band, was tasked with recreating Buckingham's guitar parts live, which he found to be "a challenge" as he was unaccustomed to learning other musician's parts. He said that he "learned a lot about the guitar by having to learn Lindsey's parts" and compared the world tour as a "beautiful paid vacation".

== Set list ==
This set list is representative of the show on March 11, 2019. It may not represent all concerts for the duration of the tour.

1. "The Chain"
2. "Little Lies"
3. "Dreams"
4. "Second Hand News"
5. "Say You Love Me"
6. "Black Magic Woman"
7. "Everywhere"
8. "Rhiannon"
9. "Tell Me All the Things You Do"
10. "World Turning"
11. "Gypsy"
12. "Oh Well"
13. "Don't Dream It's Over"
14. "Landslide"
15. "Hold Me"
16. "Monday Morning"
17. "You Make Loving Fun"
18. "Gold Dust Woman"
19. "Go Your Own Way"
  Encore
20. "Free Fallin'"
21. "Don't Stop"
22. "All Over Again"
23. "Albatross" (outro)

=== Notes ===
- "Storms" and "Hypnotized" were performed from October 3 to 14, 2018.
- "Isn't It Midnight" was performed from October 3 to November 23, 2018, until "Hold Me" replaced it.
- On October 28, 2018, "Gypsy" was added to the set list.
- For 2019 dates, "Black Magic Woman" and "Everywhere" swapped places and "I Got You" and "Man of the World" replaced "Tell Me All the Things You Do" and "Monday Morning", respectively.
- "All Over Again" was cut from the setlist on March 26, 2019.
- "Blue Letter" was performed in Perth.

== Tour dates ==
List of concerts
Date	City	Country	Venue	Attendance	Box office
October 3, 2018	Tulsa	United States	BOK Center	10,651 / 10,651	$1,451,846
October 6, 2018	Chicago	United States	United Center	15,042 / 15,042	$2,291,909
October 8, 2018	Grand Rapids	United States	Van Andel Arena	9,576 / 9,576	$1,349,012
October 10, 2018	Louisville	United States	KFC Yum! Center	11,087 / 11,087	$1,412,766
October 12, 2018	Lincoln	United States	Pinnacle Bank Arena	10,221 / 10,221	$1,165,339
October 14, 2018	Des Moines	United States	Wells Fargo Arena	9,211 / 9,211	$1,223,202
October 16, 2018	Indianapolis	United States	Bankers Life Fieldhouse	10,928 / 10,928	$1,456,172
October 18, 2018	Kansas City	United States	Sprint Center	11,646 / 11,646	$1,626,949
October 20, 2018	St. Louis	United States	Enterprise Center	12,982 / 12,982	$1,619,814
October 22, 2018	Saint Paul	United States	Xcel Energy Center	12,975 / 12,975	$1,867,097
October 26, 2018	Cleveland	United States	Quicken Loans Arena	12,138 / 12,138	$1,660,301
October 28, 2018	Milwaukee	United States	Fiserv Forum	10,894 / 10,894	$1,491,507
October 30, 2018	Detroit	United States	Little Caesars Arena	15,684 / 15,684	$1,924,401
November 1, 2018	Pittsburgh	United States	PPG Paints Arena	13,311 / 13,311	$1,727,612
November 3, 2018	Ottawa	Canada	Canadian Tire Centre	12,473 / 12,473	$1,045,573
November 5, 2018	Toronto	Canada	Scotiabank Arena	14,993 / 14,993	$1,617,703
November 7, 2018	Columbus	United States	Nationwide Arena	13,159 / 13,159	$1,777,623
November 14, 2018	Vancouver	Canada	Rogers Arena	13,630 / 13,630	$1,319,752
November 17, 2018	Tacoma	United States	Tacoma Dome	18,828 / 18,828	$2,351,594
November 19, 2018	Portland	United States	Moda Center	13,698 / 13,698	$1,935,225
November 21, 2018	San Jose	United States	SAP Center	11,413 / 11,413	$1,650,803
November 23, 2018	Sacramento	United States	Golden 1 Center	13,658 / 13,658	$2,077,865
November 25, 2018	Oakland	United States	Oracle Arena	12,903 / 12,903	$1,806,852
November 28, 2018	Phoenix	United States	Talking Stick Resort Arena	13,847 / 13,847	$2,000,833
November 30, 2018	Paradise (Note: Promoted as Las Vegas)	United States	T-Mobile Arena	15,038 / 15,450	$2,305,731
December 3, 2018	Denver	United States	Pepsi Center	13,344 / 13,344	$1,930,543
December 6, 2018	Fresno	United States	Save Mart Center	10,854 / 10,854	$1,412,811
December 8, 2018	San Diego	United States	Viejas Arena	10,036 / 10,036	$1,630,822
December 11, 2018	Inglewood	United States	The Forum	42,628 / 52,500	$5,900,000
December 13, 2018	Inglewood	United States	The Forum	42,628 / 52,500	$5,900,000
December 15, 2018	Inglewood	United States	The Forum	42,628 / 52,500	$5,900,000
January 31, 2019	Denver	United States	Pepsi Center	13,511 / 13,511	$1,652,308
February 2, 2019	Sioux Falls	United States	Denny Sanford Premier Center	10,568 / 10,568	$1,473,110
February 5, 2019	Houston	United States	Toyota Center	12,561 / 12,561	$1,833,005
February 7, 2019	Dallas	United States	American Airlines Center	14,434 / 15,237	$2,370,345
February 9, 2019	Austin	United States	Frank Erwin Center	13,174 / 13,174	$2,001,664
February 13, 2019	Birmingham	United States	Legacy Arena	14,018 / 14,018	$1,912,397
February 16, 2019	New Orleans	United States	Smoothie King Center	14,177 / 14,177	$1,930,722
February 18, 2019	Tampa	United States	Amalie Arena	14,938 / 14,938	$2,130,194
February 20, 2019	Sunrise	United States	BB&T Center	14,039 / 14,039	$1,991,585
February 22, 2019	Columbia	United States	Colonial Life Arena	13,392 / 13,392	$1,902,658
February 24, 2019	Charlotte	United States	Spectrum Center	15,411 / 15,411	$2,087,245
February 27, 2019	Nashville	United States	Bridgestone Arena	14,635 / 14,635	$2,165,057
March 1, 2019	Chicago	United States	United Center	14,524 / 14,524	$2,007,945
March 3, 2019	Atlanta	United States	State Farm Arena	11,890 / 11,890	$2,014,845
March 5, 2019	Washington, D.C.	United States	Capital One Arena	14,623 / 14,623	$2,136,769
March 9, 2019	Atlantic City	United States	Boardwalk Hall	12,742 / 12,742	$1,937,316
March 11, 2019	New York City	United States	Madison Square Garden	30,912 / 30,912 (Note: The score data is representative of the both shows at Madison Square Garden on March 11 and 18 respectively.)	$4,769,179
March 13, 2019	Newark	United States	Prudential Center	13,044 / 13,044	$1,792,378
March 15, 2019	Hartford	United States	XL Center	11,708 / 11,708	$1,598,904
March 18, 2019	New York City	United States	Madison Square Garden	—	—
March 20, 2019	Albany	United States	Times Union Center	11,636 / 11,636	$1,545,428
March 22, 2019	Philadelphia	United States	Wells Fargo Center	13,170 / 13,170	$1,619,815
March 24, 2019	Baltimore	United States	Royal Farms Arena	12,475 / 12,475	$1,741,915
March 26, 2019	Buffalo	United States	KeyBank Center	14,034 / 14,034	$1,857,080
March 31, 2019	Boston	United States	TD Garden	13,645 / 13,645	$2,119,805
June 6, 2019	Berlin	Germany	Waldbühne	20,379 / 20,379	$2,481,439
June 8, 2019 (Note: The June 8, 2019, concert in Werchter is part of Werchter Boutique Festival.)	Werchter	Belgium	Werchter Festival Grounds	45,000 / 45,000	—N/a
June 10, 2019 (Note: The June 10, 2019, concert in Landgraaf is part of Pinkpop Festival.)	Landgraaf	Netherlands	Megaland Park	48,000 / 48,000	—N/a
June 13, 2019	Dublin	Ireland	RDS Arena	35,247 / 35,247	$4,179,376
June 16, 2019	London	England	Wembley Stadium	108,469 / 108,469	$17,155,177
June 18, 2019	London	England	Wembley Stadium	108,469 / 108,469	$17,155,177
August 9, 2019	Perth	Australia	RAC Arena	26,767 / 26,767	$3,572,209
August 11, 2019	Perth	Australia	RAC Arena	26,767 / 26,767	$3,572,209
August 15, 2019	Sydney	Australia	Qudos Bank Arena	—N/a	—N/a
August 17, 2019	Sydney	Australia	Qudos Bank Arena	—N/a	—N/a
August 20, 2019	Brisbane	Australia	Brisbane Entertainment Centre	31,973 / 31,973	$4,554,409
August 22, 2019	Brisbane	Australia	Brisbane Entertainment Centre	31,973 / 31,973	$4,554,409
August 24, 2019	Brisbane	Australia	Brisbane Entertainment Centre	31,973 / 31,973	$4,554,409
August 27, 2019	Sydney	Australia	Qudos Bank Arena	—N/a	—N/a
August 29, 2019	Sydney	Australia	Qudos Bank Arena	—N/a	—N/a
September 2, 2019	Melbourne	Australia	Rod Laver Arena	53,072 / 53,072	$7,303,980
September 4, 2019	Melbourne	Australia	Rod Laver Arena	53,072 / 53,072	$7,303,980
September 7, 2019	Melbourne	Australia	Rod Laver Arena	53,072 / 53,072	$7,303,980
September 9, 2019	Melbourne	Australia	Rod Laver Arena	53,072 / 53,072	$7,303,980
September 12, 2019	Auckland	New Zealand	Spark Arena	41,042 / 41,042	$5,779,089
September 14, 2019	Auckland	New Zealand	Spark Arena	41,042 / 41,042	$5,779,089
September 16, 2019	Auckland	New Zealand	Spark Arena	41,042 / 41,042	$5,779,089
September 19, 2019	Auckland	New Zealand	Spark Arena	41,042 / 41,042	$5,779,089
September 21, 2019	Dunedin	New Zealand	Forsyth Barr Stadium	35,000 / 35,000	—N/a
October 28, 2019	Boston	United States	TD Garden	13,826 / 13,826	$1,930,630
October 30, 2019	Quebec City	Canada	Videotron Centre	—N/a	—N/a
November 1, 2019	Toronto	Canada	Scotiabank Arena	16,406 / 16,406	$1,630,908
November 3, 2019	Philadelphia	United States	Wells Fargo Center	15,854 / 15,854	$2,314,487
November 7, 2019	Winnipeg	Canada	Bell MTS Place	11,167 / 11,167	$994,352
November 10, 2019	Calgary	Canada	Scotiabank Saddledome	—N/a	—N/a
November 12, 2019	Edmonton	Canada	Rogers Place	—N/a	—N/a
November 16, 2019	Paradise	United States	T-Mobile Arena	15,464 / 15,464	$2,939,051
Total				1,181,675 / 1,253,775 (94%)	$156,458,433

== Personnel ==
- Mick Fleetwood – drums, percussion
- John McVie – bass guitar
- Christine McVie – vocals, keyboards, maracas on "Everywhere" and "World Turning"
- Stevie Nicks – vocals, tambourine
- Mike Campbell – lead guitar, Marxophone on "Gypsy", lead vocals on "Oh Well”
- Neil Finn – vocals, rhythm guitar, lead guitar on "Don't Dream It's Over", keyboards on "All Over Again"

Additional musicians

- Neale Heywood – rhythm guitar, lead guitar on "Landslide", backing vocals
- Sharon Celani – backing vocals
- Marilyn Martin – backing vocals
- Taku Hirano – percussion
- Ricky Peterson – keyboards, backing vocals
