= Frozen Love =

Song by Buckingham Nicks

from the album Buckingham Nicks
- Released: September 1973
- Recorded: 1973
- Studio: Sound City Studios, Van Nuys, California
- Length: 7:16
- Label: Polydor
- Songwriters: Stevie Nicks; Lindsey Buckingham
- Producer: Keith Olsen

"Frozen Love" is a song written by Stevie Nicks and Lindsey Buckingham. The song is the final track on their 1973 album Buckingham Nicks. At over seven minutes in length, it is also the album's longest track. It is the only song on the album where the two shared co-writing credits and also one of the few songs in their careers to have this distinction.

"Frozen Love" was one of the songs that Keith Olsen played for Mick Fleetwood during his first visit at Sound City Studios. The song's guitar solo in particular caught Fleetwood's attention and prompted him to ask the duo to join Fleetwood Mac after the departure of their guitarist Bob Welch.

== Background ==
=== Composition ===
Nicks remarked in a 1975 interview that "Frozen Love" was written when she and Buckingham began their romantic relationship. The song was initially written by Nicks as a poem and later plotted out the musical accompaniment on an acoustic guitar; she then handed it over to Buckingham for revision. In 2025, Buckingham commented that "She understood that I was transforming things for her, and I understood that I wouldn't have had anything to transform without the beautiful center that she’d given me."

Lyrically, Nicks said that the song was "about two people that were in love, that had a lot of differences and saw the world slightly differently, but had this relationship that seemed to be a gift ... I like to think of it as Wuthering Heights or Great Expectations — a modern day love affair." The liner notes found in the original release contained the lyrics "Hate gave you me for a lover" in the third verse, which was later corrected in the liner notes for the 2025 edition to "Fate gave you me for a lover". In 2025 Nicks attributed the typo to her pronunciation of the word "fate" and wished that she could have re-recorded that line to remove any ambiguity.

"Frozen Love" is the only song on Buckingham Nicks where Buckingham and Nicks share co-writing credits. Buckingham said that the song was pieced together separately and "was not strictly a collaboration where two writers are co-captaining the entire process". Instead, Nicks was responsible for the verses and choruses whereas Buckingham created the instrumental interlude. Buckingham wanted the instrumental section to have "this epic quality about it" that resembled "a mini movie" that would segue back into the full song. Commenting on this part, Nicks said that "if it had just remained my song and Lindsey hadn't have written that whole part, it wouldn't have been the same."

From the onset, Nicks was adamant about splitting the verses between herself and Buckingham so that the song was presented as "a relationship made of two instead of a relationship just made of one." Buckingham perceived "Frozen Love" as having been written from Nicks' point of view and felt that the song worked well as taking on the form of a dialogue. They also interpreted the song as being about the interruptions and turbulence in their romantic relationship.

=== Recording ===
The song was demoed at night in a warehouse within a coffee plant owned by Buckingham's father Morris in Palo Alto. Buckingham created the middle section for "Frozen Love" and Nicks was responsible for the remainder of the song. Buckingham took inspiration from Jimmy Page and the Allman Brothers Band when approaching the song's guitar parts. He recalled that the song presented him with the opportunity to explore different guitar tunings.

For the guitar solo, Buckingham said that he worked in a modal open tuning and created chords "that made sense with the tuning." He described the end result as "specific" and "idiosyncratic" and felt that the song had "so much range and landscape". Gary Hodges, who met Buckingham at a water fountain in Sound City Studios, overdubbed the drums in Studio A of the facility after all of the instrumentation and vocals had been recorded. Buckingham explained that the song had a number of twists and turns rhythmically" that rendered it difficult to record the song with live drums. As such, Buckingham and Olsen guided Hodges through the song as he recorded his part to a click track. The song's string orchestration during the coda was arranged by Richard Halligan. "Frozen Love" later received airplay on Birmingham radio stations, which prompted the band to schedule a show there in August 1974, where they opened for the band Mountain.

=== Catalyst for joining Fleetwood Mac ===
Buckingham and Nicks were working on their follow-up album to Buckingham Nicks in Studio B of Sound City Studios when Olsen played "Frozen Love" for Fleetwood in the adjacent Studio A, which was selected to demonstrate the sonic capabilities of the facility. For most of their sessions at Sound City Studios, Buckingham and Nicks recorded their material at night so that their work would not interfere with Olsen's other projects. During Fleetwood's visit, the duo's audio engineer and friend Richard Dashut secured them access that day to Studio B as there was an opening in the schedule. When Olsen was playing "Frozen Love" for Fleetwood, Buckingham was passing by when he overheard the song being played. Buckingham then opened the door, entered the room, and saw "this giant of a man standing up, grooving to a guitar solo of mine." He later said that "it took me a minute to register who it was", adding that he was "already a Fleetwood Mac fan, certainly a huge fan of Peter Green's, so it was a big deal for me". When the song ended, Olsen confirmed Fleetwood's identity to Buckingham with a social introduction: "Oh, Lindsey, this is Mick Fleetwood." Fleetwood then complimented Buckingham on his guitar work: “it was economic, melodic, with an astute sense of tone and a unique style.”

Fleetwood recalled that he met Buckingham "literally in passing" and did not think much of the encounter initially. Buckingham said that Olsen did not explain why he played "Frozen Love" for Fleetwood and that he "never questioned" Olsen's decision. Fleetwood later reflected in his 2014 Play On memoir that "Frozen Love" impressed him the most of the songs that Olsen played for him. This later spurred Fleetwood's decision to ask Buckingham to join Fleetwood Mac after their guitarist Bob Welch departed from the band in December.

Fleetwood telephoned Olsen on New Year's Eve and inquired if the guitarist who played on "Frozen Love", whose name he had since forgotten, would replace Welch as Fleetwood Mac's guitarist. After Olsen informed him that Buckingham and Nicks came as a pair, Fleetwood asked Olsen if both would be willing to join the band. After ending the call with Olsen, Fleetwood commented to Fleetwood Mac’s photographer Herbie Worthington: “Oh, Herbie, we found a guitar player to take Bob’s place.... The only thing is he’s got a girl, but if she don’t work out, we’ll dump her.” Olsen then visited their apartment on Fairfax Avenue and spent the next few hours asking the two to become members of Fleetwood Mac. Buckingham mentioned that he was insistent on Nicks joining Fleetwood Mac with him. After the Olsen visit ended, Buckingham was very reluctant to accept the Fleetwood Mac offer, but Nicks then spent many hours persuading Buckingham to agree. After convening at a Mexican restaurant for dinner, Fleetwood Mac officially invited Buckingham and Nicks into the band.

According to Olsen, Fleetwood Mac considered the idea of re-recording "Frozen Love" for their 1975 Fleetwood Mac album, but Buckingham thought that the song would be too difficult to recreate, so they decided against it. Some of the initial tour dates for the band's 1975 Fleetwood Mac Tour included "Frozen Love" in the setlist, often as an encore.

=== Use in announcing the remaster of Buckingham Nicks ===
In July 2025, a video of Fleetwood listening to "Frozen Love" with headphones was published on his Instagram account. The following day, the social media accounts of Nicks and Buckingham posted handwritten lyrics from the song; Nicks' account posted the line "And if you go forward", with Buckingham's account following an hour later with the second half of the lyric: "I'll meet you there". Less than a week later, a remastered edition of Buckingham Nicks was announced for release on September 19, 2025; the Associated Press said that the social media posts "foreshadowed" the remastered edition of the album. "Frozen Love" was issued as a digital single in advance of the album's release.

== Critical reception ==
Dan Hedges reviewed the song a year after the release of Buckingham Nicks in Rock magazine, saying that the "epic track" featured the duo's "most striking vocal work." In his review of Buckingham Nicks John Duffy of AllMusic thought that the duo were "over-reaching themselves just a bit" on "Frozen Love". In an updated review from the website, Tim Sendra labeled the track as the most impressive offering on the album, adding that it "lasts a long time but never gets boring", which he attributed to the song's "winding harmonies and Buckingham's vibrant guitar work on both acoustic and electric. It's easy to see what caught Fleetwood's ear."

Classic Rock magazine highlighted "Frozen Love" as the "real prize" on Buckingham Nicks and identified the song as a "distant precursor" to Fleetwood Mac's song "The Chain". Record Collector also thought that aspects of the song's middle-section that resembled "The Chain" and said that the song's guitar part "lacks the provocative push John McVie's bassline was to bestow" later on "The Chain". Consequence of Sound called it a "majestic cut" with "a moving string section and an extended bridge that burns with fiery emotion". Uncut said that the song's "duelling vocals and spectral folk" were juxtaposed with its "looser second section". Mojo characterized the song as a "proggy, shape-shifting holy grail of Fleetwood Mac's most combustible couple."
