= Monday Morning (Fleetwood Mac song) =

Song by Fleetwood Mac

from the album Fleetwood Mac
- A-side: "Say You Love Me"
- Released: 11 July 1975
- Recorded: January–February 1975
- Genre: Rock
- Length: 2:48
- Label: Warner Bros.
- Songwriter: Lindsey Buckingham
- Producers: Fleetwood Mac, Keith Olsen

"Monday Morning" is a 1975 song written and sung by Fleetwood Mac guitarist Lindsey Buckingham. It is the first track from the multi-platinum, second eponymous album Fleetwood Mac. The song was included on the band's 2002 compilation album, The Very Best of Fleetwood Mac.

== Background ==
Like "Rhiannon" and "I'm So Afraid", "Monday Morning" was intended for a second Buckingham Nicks LP, but the album never came to fruition as their label, Polydor Records, dropped the duo from their roster before they could record a follow-up. Buckingham said that there was originally some uncertainty surrounding the prospects of these songs given their lack of a record deal.

"Monday Morning" was among the songs presented to the rest of Fleetwood Mac on Buckingham's 4-track tape machine during the 1975 recording sessions of Fleetwood Mac. While drummer Mick Fleetwood immediately took a liking to the demos, bassist John McVie was initially hesitant to venture away from the band's blues roots. Producer Keith Olsen convinced McVie that the band would be more successful embracing pop rock, quipping, "It’s a much faster way to the bank". An earlier take of the song found on the 2018 deluxe edition of Fleetwood Mac had a less prominent bassline; the bass guitar's presence was increased on the final version.

In an interview with Nile Rodgers, Buckingham said that the song "was very reflective of the early dynamic that was later to become a hallmark of Fleetwood Mac, which was couples breaking up, the angst of having to push forward." He believed that the song foreshadowed some of the band's interpersonal struggles and mentioned that the lyrics related to the fluctuations of his romantic relationship with Nicks.

The song really was just addressing the fact that maybe on Monday everything was great, but by Friday things weren’t so great. As can be the case with relationships in general.

== Critical reception ==
Bud Scopa of Rolling Stone thought that "Monday Morning" had the most "initial appeal" of Buckingham's compositions on Fleetwood Mac's 1975 eponymous album. Record World characterised it as a "commercial pleaser". Billboard labelled "Monday Morning" as one of the "best cuts" from Fleetwood Mac in their 1975 review of the album. In 2018 review, the same publication called it both "buoyant" and "surging". Matthew Greenwald of AllMusic described the song as "a brilliant opening to a brilliant album" which he attributed to Buckingham's "strong pop instincts and craftsmanship". Paste ranked the song number 30 on its list of the 30 greatest Fleetwood Mac songs, calling it a "bold first offering from Buckingham".

== Live performances ==
Prior to its inclusion on any Fleetwood Mac setlists, Buckingham and Nicks first performed "Monday Morning" for a series of gigs promoting their 1973 self-titled album. "Monday Morning" was performed on all of Fleetwood Mac's tours from 1975 to 1980. Some performances from these tours have been included on various releases, including a live recording from The Fabulous Forum in Inglewood on 29 August 1977, which was appeared on disc 2 of the Rumours deluxe edition. A live recording from a February 1980 performance in Tokyo was included on the band's Live album.

Fleetwood Mac also played the song on the Unleashed Tour in 2009 and the An Evening with Fleetwood Mac Tour in 2018–2019. On the An Evening With Fleetwood Mac Tour, "Monday Morning" was sung by Neil Finn, who was one of the musicians who replaced Buckingham following his dismissal from the band in 2018. Finn identified "Monday Morning" as a "strange song with a weird lyrics" that was difficult to perform live due to the strain it caused to his voice. He attributed this to the lack of gaps in the lyrics and the song being in a key that required him to sing in a high vocal register. Finn said that he was "blowing [his] voice out every night singing it" and asked if the song could be dropped the song down a few semitones, although the band instead dropped the song from the setlist entirely.

== Personnel ==
- Mick Fleetwood – drums
- John McVie – bass guitar
- Christine McVie – keyboards
- Lindsey Buckingham – acoustic guitars, electric guitars, lead and backing vocals
- Stevie Nicks – backing vocals
