= I'm Missin' You =

Single by Shirley Myers

from the album There Will Come a Day
- Released: 2000
- Genre: Country
- Length: 3:49
- Label: Stony Plain
- Songwriters: Shirley Myers; Rod Nicholson; Duane Steele
- Producer: Keith Olsen

Shirley Myers singles chronology
"You Better Be Sure" (1999)	"I'm Missin' You" (2000)	"No One" (2000)

"I'm Missin' You" is a song recorded by the Canadian country music artist Shirley Myers. It was released in 2000 as the third single from her second studio album, There Will Come a Day. It peaked at number 10 on the RPM Country Tracks chart in June 2000.

== Chart performance ==
Chart (2000)	Peak position
Canada Country Singles (RPM)	10
