= Forever in Love (Shirley Myers song) =

Single by Shirley Myers with Duane Steele

from the album There Will Come a Day
- Released: 1999
- Genre: Country
- Length: 3:27
- Label: Stony Plain
- Songwriters: Shirley Myers; Duane Steele; Rod Nicholson
- Producer: Keith Olsen

Shirley Myers singles chronology
"Fallin' Out of Love" (1998)	"Forever in Love" (1999)	"You Better Be Sure" (1999)

Duane Steele singles chronology
"Right from the Start" (1998)	"Forever in Love" (1999)	"Little Black Dress" (1999)

"Forever in Love" is a song recorded by Canadian country music artists Shirley Myers and Duane Steele. It was released in 1999 as the first single from Myers' second studio album, There Will Come a Day. It peaked at number 9 on the RPM Country Tracks chart in August 1999.

== Chart performance ==
Chart (1999)	Peak position
Canada Country Singles (RPM)	9

=== Year-end charts ===
Chart (1999)	Position
Canada Country Tracks (RPM)	41
