= Shirley Eikhard =

Canadian singer-songwriter (1955–2022)

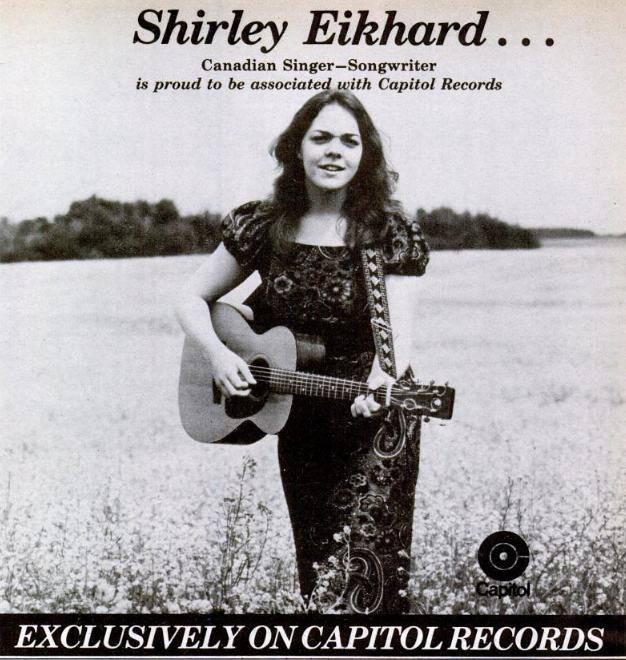
- Eikhard in 1973

Background information
- Born: Shirley Rose Eikhard; 7 November 1955; Sackville, New Brunswick, Canada
- Died: 15 December 2022 (aged 67) Orangeville, Ontario, Canada
- Genres: Country, pop, jazz
- Occupations: Singer, songwriter
- Years active: 1968–2022

Shirley Rose Eikhard (7 November 1955 – 15 December 2022) was a Canadian singer-songwriter. Although moderately successful in Canada as a performer in her own right, she had her greatest Canadian and international success as a songwriter for other artists, most notably as the writer of Bonnie Raitt's 1991 hit "Something to Talk About".

== Early life ==
Eikhard was born in Sackville, New Brunswick. Her mother, June Eikhard (born Marguerite Cameron in Moncton) began her musical career with her husband, Eikhard's late father, bassist Cecil Eikhard, in the 1950s when both parents were members of a small local band, the Tantramar Ramblers. Her mother, June, released her debut album, Canada's First Lady of the Fiddle, in 1959, and was the first woman to participate in the Canadian Open Old Time Fiddlers' Contest.

The family relocated to Oshawa, Ontario, when Eikhard was in her early teens. She was given her first guitar at age 11, and at age 12 she first performed on stage at a fiddling festival in Cobourg, Ontario.

== Career ==
At age 13, following her debut performance in Cobourg, Eikhard successfully auditioned for the Songwriter's Workshop at the 1969 Mariposa Folk Festival where she played alongside Joni Mitchell, Ian & Sylvia, and Bruce Cockburn. Two years later, when she was 15, her song "It Takes Time" was recorded by Anne Murray and became a hit in Canada. The song was also recorded by Kim Carnes for her 1971 album Rest on Me.

In 1972, Earl Ball of Capitol Records was alerted to her growing reputation and signed her to the label. She released her first album, Shirley Eikhard, which was moderately successful and won Eikhard two Juno Awards for Country Female Artist of the Year at both the Juno Awards of 1973 and the Juno Awards of 1974.

After a three-year career break, she returned to recording and released three albums for Attic Records, Child of the Present, Let Me Down Easy, and Horizons. Though again none were big sellers, they included her cover versions of "Don’t Let Me Down Again" by Buckingham Nicks and Christine McVie's "Say You Love Me". "Say You Love Me" was released as a single several weeks in advance of Fleetwood Mac in early June 1976. Eikhard took the song into the Canadian top 40, peaking at No. 34; Fleetwood Mac's version, released only a few weeks later, peaked at No. 29 in September.

In 1981, Emmylou Harris recorded Eikhard's "Good News", later also releasing a version of Eikhard’s "Maybe Tonight".

She contributed backing vocals to her friend Mary Lu Zahalan's Think of Me that was released in 1982.

Through the 1980s, she battled both stage fright and throat problems and was advised by her doctor that she should stop performing in clubs due to an allergy to cigarette smoke. Following her 1987 album Taking Charge for WEA Records, a period which she would later describe as the nadir of her life, her prominence in the music industry had significantly declined, and she had started to pursue background extra work in film and television to support herself. By 1989, however, the tide began to turn for her as a songwriter again, with singers such as Rita Coolidge, Mary Lu Zahalan and Alannah Myles recording Eikhard songs.

Anne Murray had wanted to record Eikhard's "Something to Talk About" in 1985, but the song was rejected by her producers; despite the song not being on Murray's album, it was still titled Something to Talk About. In 1991, Bonnie Raitt recorded the song and released it as the lead-off single for her album Luck of the Draw. The biggest chart hit for both Eikhard and Raitt, the song had significant airplay throughout the 1990s. The song earned Raitt a Grammy Award for Best Female Pop Vocal Performance in 1991, with the album earning Raitt a second Grammy that year. In Canada, "Something to Talk About" earned Eikhard a Juno nomination as Songwriter of the Year at the Juno Awards of 1992, and later a SOCAN Classics award.

Although she toured earlier in her career, Eikhard later refrained from exhaustive touring. She performed at selected events and occasional club dates, often with her brother, the late Brent Eikhard.

In the early 1990s, she performed with Gwen Swick and Cherie Camp in the trio The Three Marias; her songs were also recorded by artists such as Quartette ("It's Just a Little Rain") and Cher ("Born with the Hunger"). She sang the theme song to the movie The Passion of Ayn Rand, "Love Is, Love Is Not". "Lovers Forever", a song she originally wrote with Cher for the 1994 film Interview with the Vampire, is featured on Cher's 2013 studio album Closer to the Truth.

In 1995, she recorded a new album, If I Had My Way, co-produced with her long-standing keyboard player Evelyne Datl. She also contributed the theme song to a new Warner Brothers film, Something to Talk About. In the late 1990s she started to record and perform jazz, releasing the albums The Jazz Sessions (1996) and Going Home (1998), headlining her own concert special in 1998 as an episode of Bravo!'s Live at the Rehearsal Hall.

In 2020, Eikhard was inducted into the Canadian Songwriters Hall of Fame for "Something to Talk About".

Eikhard released her final album, On My Way to You in October 2021. It featured the song "Anything Is Possible", about her recent diagnosis with cancer.

== Personal life ==
Eikhard's partner, Lola Catherine Osborne, died in 2021. Eikhard lived in Harriston, Ontario.

Eikhard died of cancer in Orangeville, Ontario on 15 December 2022, at the age of 67.

== Awards and recognition ==
- 1973: winner, Juno Award for Best Country Female Artist
- 1974: winner, Juno Award for Best Country Female Artist
- 1992: nominee, Juno Award for Songwriter of the Year
- 2020: inducted, Canadian Songwriter's Hall of Fame

== Discography ==
=== Albums ===
Year	Title	CAN
1972	Shirley Eikhard	58
1975	Child of the Present	
1976	Let Me Down Easy	
1977	Horizons	
1987	Taking Charge	
1995	If I Had My Way	
1996	The Jazz Sessions	
1998	Going Home	
1999	The Last Hurrah	
2001	End of the Day	
2003	Stay Open	
2005	Country	
2005	Pop	
2006	The Holidays Are Here	
2007	Stuck in This Groove	
2008	Riding on the 65	
2012	Dream of a Perfect Day	
2021	On My Way to You	

=== Singles ===
Year	Title	Chart Positions			Album
Year	Title	CAN	CAN AC	CAN Country	Album
1971	"It Takes Time"	—	7	33	Shirley Eikhard
1971	"Something in Your Face"	—	2	11	Shirley Eikhard
1972	"Smiling Wine"	49	1	1	Shirley Eikhard
1973	"Right on Believing"	—	—	40	single only
1974	"Rescue Me"	87	70	98	single only
1975	"Play a Little Bit Longer"	72	18	—	Child of the Present
1976	"I Just Wanted You to Know"	77	18	—	Child of the Present
1976	"Say You Love Me"	34	4	—	Let Me Down Easy
1977	"Let Me Down Easy"	64	20	—	Let Me Down Easy
1977	"Someday Soon"	—	21	—	Horizons
1977	"Don't Let Me Down"	76	19	—	Horizons
1983	"Something That Lasts"	—	22	—	Taking Charge
1986	"It's Understood"	—	27	—	Taking Charge
1987	"You're My Weakness"	—	25	—	Taking Charge
1995	"Take the Fall"	—	30	51	If I Had My Way
2021	"Anything is Possible"				On My Way to You
