= Rhiannon (song) =

1976 single by Fleetwood Mac

Single by Fleetwood Mac

from the album Fleetwood Mac
- B-side: "Sugar Daddy"
- Released: February 1976 (US); April 1976 (UK)
- Recorded: February 1975
- Genre: Rock
- Length: 4:11 (album version); 3:46 (single version)
- Label: Reprise
- Songwriter: Stevie Nicks
- Producers: Fleetwood Mac; Keith Olsen

Fleetwood Mac singles chronology
"Over My Head" (1975)	"Rhiannon" (1976)	"Say You Love Me" (1976)

Music video
- "Fleetwood Mac - Rhiannon (Official Music Video) [HD Remaster]" on YouTube

"Rhiannon" (also released as a single under the title "Rhiannon (Will You Ever Win)") is a song written by Stevie Nicks and originally recorded by the British-American rock band Fleetwood Mac for their eponymous 1975 album, then issued as a single the following year. The song peaked on U.S. charts at no. 11 in June 1976. The song peaked at no. 46 in the UK singles chart for three weeks after re-release in February 1978.

"Rhiannon" was voted no. 488 in The 500 Greatest Songs of All Time by Rolling Stone magazine. They also ranked the song number six on their list of the 50 greatest Fleetwood Mac songs.

When Nicks performed the song live, she often introduced it as "a song about an old Welsh witch." During 1975–1982, Fleetwood Mac's live performances of "Rhiannon" took on a theatrical intensity not present on the FM-radio single. The song built to a climax in which Nicks's vocals were so impassioned that, as drummer and band co-founder Mick Fleetwood recalled, "her Rhiannon in those days was like an exorcism."

== Composition and recording ==
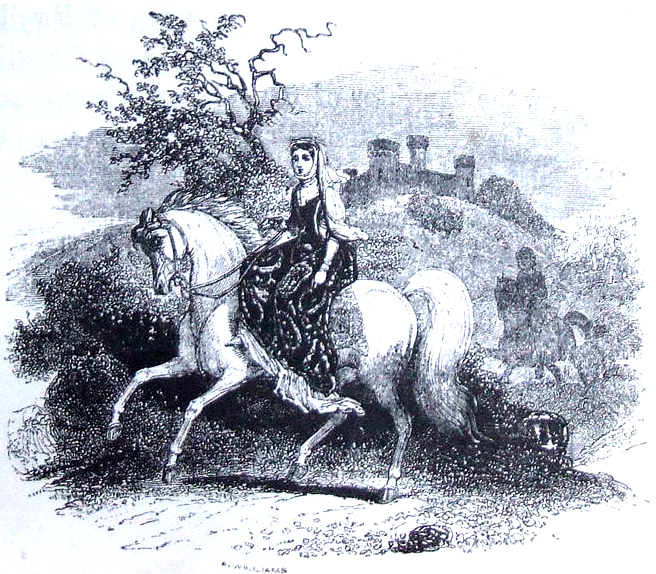
The Goddess Rhiannon is a prominent figure in Welsh Mythology

Nicks wrote "Rhiannon" after reading the novel Triad by Mary Bartlet Leader. Nicks was so taken by it that she felt she "had to write something" about the character. Nicks then composed "Rhiannon" on the piano and recorded a demo of the song onto a cassette tape. The Welsh legend of Rhiannon is mentioned in the novel, but the characters in the novel bear little resemblance to their original Welsh namesakes.

Unlike the other songs on Fleetwood Mac, which generally only required five attempts or fewer to achieve a satisfactory take, "Rhiannon" took longer to finalise. Keith Olsen, who produced the song, explained that "it was one of those songs that took over a day to get the basic track, and we're on analog tape. The first pass was kind of magical but had too many mistakes. The second pass was pretty good, but didn't have the magic, and from there it went downhill. But I kept those two". After the band returned to the studio the following afternoon, Olsen took some two-inch recording tape and looped certain sections, although this resulted in "mini scars" in some of the cymbal crashes. The best parts from the previous session were spliced together to create the final version that appeared on the album. Olsen reckoned that around 14 or 15 cuts were required to piece the song together. Some of Nicks' vocals on "Rhiannon" were processed with a Lexicon Delta T Delay unit according to Olsen.

== Single remix and release ==
The single version of the song was mixed on 19 January 1976, in studio 1 at Wally Heider Studios. Ken Caillat had previously mixed a live version of the song two days earlier from a performance at the King Biscuit Flower Hour radio show, and was interested in engineering the sessions for the radio edit, although the band had already booked Kelly Kotera for the session. However, the studio's computer-automated console crashed, and Kotera struggled to mix the song manually, which occurred as both Lindsey Buckingham and Richard Dashut hovered over him throughout the session. Dashut then asked Caillat to mix the song, which he agreed to.

Whereas Keith Olsen's album mix emphasized the instruments' bottom end, Caillat accentuated the midranges, bringing the bass guitar further up in the recording to compensate for the reduced lower frequencies. The mix took seven hours to complete and was transferred onto an Ampex stereo two-track recorder.

Upon the release of "Rhiannon" as a single, Nicks told Melody Maker that "people come up to me every place we play and tell me what an effect 'Rhiannon' has had on their lives; as if it has some spiritual power over them."

== Post-release ==
After writing the song, Nicks learned in early 1978 that Rhiannon originated from a Welsh goddess and discovered that the lyrics in her song also applied to the Welsh Rhiannon. Nicks told the Los Angeles Times that a fan sent her "four paperback novels in a Manila envelope" five years after she first wrote "Rhiannon" in 1973. Included in the envelope was Evangeline Walton's adaptation of the ancient British Mabinogion, which Nicks then bought the rights to after being "transfixed" by the prose. Nicks researched the Mabinogion story and began work on a Rhiannon project, unsure of whether it would become a movie, a musical, a cartoon, or a ballet. She created several Rhiannon-centered and themed songs from this unfinished project, including "Three Birds of Rhiannon (Maker of Birds)", "Forest of the Black Roses" and "Stay Away". Additionally, Nicks wrote the Fleetwood Mac song "Angel" based on the Rhiannon mythology.

In 2020, Nicks mentioned that she had started working on the Rhiannon project again and that it would be a television miniseries. She has earmarked ten songs for the Rhiannon miniseries, all of which are unreleased.

== Live performances ==
"Rhiannon" was first performed live with Buckingham Nicks as an uptempo number. Bob Aguirre, who was one of the drummers for the Buckingham Nicks tour, recalled that Buckingham had already finalized the song's arrangement prior to its first performance, although Nicks reminded the band to be mindful of the song's tempo. "We needed another uptempo song in the set so we made it faster, you can hear Stevie say right after her intro 'And remember, not too fast'".

Prior to the release of the band's 1975 eponymous release, Fleetwood Mac played "Rhiannon" in El Paso, Texas, which was Nicks' and Buckingham's first live show as members of Fleetwood Mac. Nicks frequently introduced "Rhiannon" as "a song about a Welsh witch" during this time period. Up until the late seventies, Christine McVie played a Fender Rhodes for live performances of "Rhiannon", saying that "the Rhodes was great to play on something like "Rhiannon" because it's so bell-like, but on anything else it would kind of get lost among the electric guitars." A live recording of "Rhiannon", taken from a 1980 performance in London, was included on Fleetwood Mac's Live album that same year. "Rhiannon" was performed on every tour from 1975 to 1982 (Fleetwood Mac Tour, Rumours Tour, Tusk Tour, and Mirage Tour). While the song was included on Fleetwood Mac's 1987–1988 Shake the Cage Tour, the band occasionally omitted "Rhiannon" from the setlist when Nicks was suffering from problems with her throat.

Following Nicks' departure from Fleetwood Mac in 1991, the band did not include "Rhiannon" in their setlist for their 1994–1995 Another Link in the Chain Tour. Nicks' replacement, Bekka Bramlett, insisted on not playing it live, largely because she felt that her voice would be unsuitable for the song. "I definitely didn't want to do 'Rhiannon' and 'Dreams' Also, I didn't sound anything like her." Before the band embarked on the tour, Christine McVie approved of Bramlett's decision, saying that it was "quite honorable to not sing those particular songs of Stevie's".

When Nicks returned to Fleetwood Mac in 1997, "Rhiannon" was added back to the band's setlist. A performance at Warner Brothers Studios in Burbank, California was included on The Dance album. "Rhiannon" remained in the setlist for the band's Say You Will Tour and also appeared on Fleetwood Mac: Live in Boston, a live video/music album taken from two nights in September 2003. AllMusic called this rendition of "Rhiannon" a "blowout performance". "Rhiannon" has since been included on every subsequent Fleetwood Mac tour, including Fleetwood Mac's Unleashed Tour in 2009, the Fleetwood Mac Live Tour in 2013, the On with the Show Tour in 2014-2015, and the An Evening with Fleetwood Mac Tour in 2018-2019.

== Reception ==
Billboard described "Rhiannon" as a "haunting song" with an "infectious melody". Record World said that "Stevie Nicks' vocal evokes a magic that is hard to ignore on this scintillating track." Harvey Kubernik of Melody Maker wrote that the song "cemented a relationship with the important AM audience that Fleetwood Mac has been seeking in the States for years."

Jason Elias of AllMusic found the vocals and lyrics to be "compelling". Alexis Petridis of The Guardian ranked the song number seven on its list of the 30 greatest Fleetwood Mac songs. He called the song's guitar riff "perfect" and thought that the rest of the music was both "coolly understated and atmospheric." Paste ranked "Rhiannon" number six on its list of the 30 greatest Fleetwood Mac songs and described it as "the first career-defining song Fleetwood Mac ever assembled."

== Personnel ==
Fleetwood Mac

- Stevie Nicks – lead vocals
- Lindsey Buckingham – guitar, backing vocals
- Christine McVie – keyboards, backing vocals
- John McVie – bass guitar
- Mick Fleetwood – drums

== Track listings ==
Standard 7-inch single

1. "Rhiannon (Will You Ever Win)" – 3:46
2. "Sugar Daddy" – 4:01

French 7-inch single

1. "Rhiannon" – 3:46
2. "Say You Love Me" – 3:58

== Charts ==
=== Weekly charts ===
Chart (1976)	Peak position
Australia (Kent Music Report)	13
Belgium (Ultratop 50 Flanders)	21
Belgium (Ultratop 50 Wallonia)	43
Canada Adult Contemporary (RPM)	4
Canada Top Singles (RPM)	4
Netherlands (Dutch Top 40)	16
Netherlands (Single Top 100)	16
US Billboard Hot 100	11
US Billboard Adult Contemporary	33
US Cash Box Top 100	9
US Record World Singles	10

Re-issue

Chart (1978)	Peak position
UK Singles (Official Charts)	46

=== Year-end charts ===
Chart (1976)	Rank
Australia (Kent Music Report)	100
Canada	63
US Billboard Hot 100	77
US Cash Box	74

== Certifications ==
Region	Certification	Certified units/sales
New Zealand (RMNZ)	5× Platinum	150,000^{‡}
United Kingdom (BPI)	2× Platinum	1,200,000^{‡}
^{‡} Sales+streaming figures based on certification alone.
