= You Better Be Sure =

Single by Shirley Myers

from the album There Will Come a Day
- Released: 1999
- Genre: Country
- Length: 4:03
- Label: Stony Plain
- Songwriters: Shirley Myers; Rod Nicholson
- Producer: Keith Olsen

Shirley Myers singles chronology
| "Forever in Love" (1999) | "You Better Be Sure" (1999) | "I'm Missin' You" (2000) |

"You Better Be Sure" is a song recorded by Canadian country music artist Shirley Myers. It was released in 1999 as the second single from her second studio album, There Will Come a Day. It peaked at number 10 on the RPM Country Tracks chart in January 2000.

== Chart performance ==
| Chart (1999–2000) | Peak position |
|---|---|
| Canada Country Singles (RPM) | 10 |
