= Haven't You Heard (Shirley Myers song) =

Single by Shirley Myers

from the album Let It Rain
- Released: 1997
- Genre: Country
- Length: 3:20
- Label: Stony Plain
- Songwriters: Shirley Myers; Rod Nicholson; Rick Scott
- Producer: Rick Scott

Shirley Myers singles chronology
"Let It Rain" (1997)	"Haven't You Heard" (1997)	"One Last Step" (1998)

"Haven't You Heard" is a song recorded by Canadian country music artist Shirley Myers. It was released in 1997 as the second single from her debut album, Let It Rain. It peaked at number 9 on the RPM Country Tracks chart in February 1998.

== Chart performance ==
Chart (1998)	Peak position
Canada Country Singles (RPM)	9
