= There Will Come a Day (album) =

Studio album by Shirley Myers
- Released: June 8, 1999
- Genre: Country
- Label: Stony Plain
- Producer: Keith Olsen

Shirley Myers chronology
Let It Rain (1997)	There Will Come a Day (1999)	A Little Time for Me (2003)

There Will Come a Day is the second studio album by Canadian country music artist Shirley Myers. It was released by Stony Plain Records on June 8, 1999. The album includes the Top Ten singles "Forever in Love," "You Better Be Sure," and "I'm Missin' You."

== Track listing ==
1. "You Better Be Sure" – 4:03
2. "I'm Missin' You" – 3:49
3. "You Left Me" – 4:28
4. "Do You Love Me" – 2:44
5. "I Give Up" – 3:09
6. "I'll Still Be Holding You" – 3:35
7. "Forever in Love" – 3:27
  - duet with Duane Steele
8. "Real True Love" – 3:45
9. "Why Can't It Be You" – 4:41
10. "Saturday Night" – 2:59
11. "There Will Come a Day" – 4:52
12. "The French Song" – 2:55

== Chart performance ==
Chart (1999)	Peak position
Canadian RPM Country Albums	29
