= Crystal (Fleetwood Mac song) =

1975 song by Fleetwood Mac

Song by Buckingham Nicks (Stevie Nicks and Lindsey Buckingham

from the album Buckingham Nicks
- Released: September 5, 1973
- Recorded: 1973
- Studio: Sound City Studios, Van Nuys, California
- Length: 3:41
- Label: Polydor/Anthem
- Songwriter: Stevie Nicks
- Producers: Lee Hasseff, Keith Olsen

"Crystal" is a song written by Stevie Nicks. The song originally appeared on her debut studio album with Lindsey Buckingham, Buckingham Nicks (1973). Two years later, after the duo joined Fleetwood Mac, the band re-recorded "Crystal" and released it on their 1975 Fleetwood Mac album. Buckingham sang lead vocals on both of these recordings. In 1998, Nicks re-recorded the song with herself on lead vocals for the Practical Magic soundtrack.

== Background ==
=== Buckingham Nicks version ===
"Crystal" first appeared on Buckingham Nicks, an album recorded by Lindsey Buckingham and Stevie Nicks in 1973 prior to their time in Fleetwood Mac. Despite being written by Nicks, the song was instead sung by Buckingham partially because producer Keith Olsen believed that his vocal timbre suited the song better. Nicks commented in the 2025 limited edition liner notes for Buckingham Nicks that she personally asked Buckingham to sing the song. "I'd written the song about him and me when things were good. I said, 'You sing it to me'". Nicks also said in a 1981 interview with Rolling Stone that she wrote the lyric "I have changed but you remain ageless" for her father. She would also reference that line during written correspondence with her father, adding that these words represented "what life is all about, because if somebody could take him away from me, they could do anything to me."

Buckingham played his guitar parts on "Crystal" in an open tuning. The recording also featured an oboe at the end of each chorus. Mick Fleetwood recalled that "Crystal" was one of the songs that he heard while visiting Sound City Studios, which he was considering as a potential studio to record the next Fleetwood Mac album. Fleetwood said that the song had "so much connective power to our story and so much power in terms of what happened next." Keith Olsen, who produced Buckingham Nicks, did not mention "Crystal" as one of the songs he played for Fleetwood, instead citing "Frozen Love" and "Django" along with some compositions from James Gang and Emitt Rhodes. In January 1975, Buckingham Nicks performed "Crystal" as an encore during a show in Tuscaloosa, Alabama. By this point, the two had already agreed to join Fleetwood Mac and were performing their last shows as members of Buckingham Nicks.

=== Fleetwood Mac version ===
"Crystal"

Song by Fleetwood Mac

from the album Fleetwood Mac
- Released: 11 July 1975
- Recorded: 1975
- Studio: Sound City Studios, Van Nuys, California
- Length: 5:14
- Label: Warner Bros.
- Songwriter: Stevie Nicks
- Producers: Fleetwood Mac, Keith Olsen

After Buckingham and Nicks joined Fleetwood Mac, the band opted to record another version of "Crystal" for their 1975 Fleetwood Mac album, again with Buckingham on lead vocals. John McVie had suggested that the band re-record "Crystal", although Nicks was not initially supportive of the idea because she preferred to have one of her newer songs to appear on the album instead. For this recording, Christine McVie recorded the keyboard solo on a multimoog synthesizer. "It wasn't even mine, though. There was some mad little professor guy running around twiddling all the knobs for me while I played it. I think he slept with the damn thing". Buckingham treated his guitar with a variable speed oscillator, a device that was used to alter the speed of a tape machine and thus manipulate the sound of the guitar. The band previewed the song during their Fleetwood Mac Tour prior to the album's release.

=== Stevie Nicks version ===
In 1998, Nicks recorded another version of the song for the Practical Magic soundtrack, this time with herself on lead vocals. This version was produced by Sheryl Crow and is featured several times during the film, including one of the opening scenes. Bob Aguirre, who played drums in a band with Nicks during the early 1970s, said that he was "floored by the way she sang it" and gave Nicks a phone call to compliment her vocal performance.

== Personnel ==
Fleetwood Mac version

- Lindsey Buckingham – lead vocals, guitar
- Mick Fleetwood – drums
- Christine McVie – keyboards
- John McVie – bass guitar
- Stevie Nicks – backing vocals
