= Mary Bartlet Leader =

American author (1918–2004)

Mary Bartlet Leader (March 19, 1918 – April 27, 2004, in Mequon, Wisconsin) was the American author of two novels, Triad: A Novel of the Supernatural (1973) and Salem’s Children (1979). Triad was the inspiration behind the popular Fleetwood Mac song "Rhiannon".

Leader died on April 27, 2004, in Mequon, Ozaukee County, Wisconsin where she had been a long time resident.
