= Let It Rain (Shirley Myers song) =

Single by Shirley Myers

from the album Let It Rain
- Released: 1997
- Genre: Country
- Length: 3:05
- Label: Stony Plain
- Songwriters: Shirley Myers; Rod Nicholson; Rick Scott
- Producer: Rick Scott

Shirley Myers singles chronology
"Let It Rain" (1997)	"Haven't You Heard" (1997)

"Let It Rain" is a song recorded by Canadian country music artist Shirley Myers. It was released in 1997 as the first single from her debut album, Let It Rain. It peaked at number 3 on the RPM Country Tracks chart in August 1997.

== Chart performance ==
Chart (1997)	Peak position
Canada Country Singles (RPM)	3

=== Year-end charts ===
Chart (1997)	Position
Canada Country Tracks (RPM)	29
