= World Turning =

Song by Fleetwood Mac

from the album Fleetwood Mac
- Released: 1975
- Recorded: 1975
- Genre: Blues rock, country rock
- Length: 4:25
- Label: Reprise
- Songwriters: Christine McVie, Lindsey Buckingham
- Producers: Fleetwood Mac; Keith Olsen

"World Turning" is a song written by Christine McVie and Lindsey Buckingham for the British/American rock band Fleetwood Mac's tenth album, Fleetwood Mac. Fleetwood Mac took inspiration from a song included on their 1968 debut album titled "The World Keeps on Turning" and reworked it for their 1975 album. The band has since performed "World Turning" live on several concert tours, often with an extended drum solo.

== Background ==
The origins of "World Turning" date back to 1968 when Fleetwood Mac's first album, titled Fleetwood Mac, was released. One of the tracks included on the album was "The World Keep on Turning", which was written by founding member Peter Green. The band reinterpreted this song for the 1975 Fleetwood Mac sessions and truncated the title of their updated version to "World Turning". Fleetwood referred to the song as "an intersection of both eras of the band".

Unlike other songs on the album, "World Turning" was a collaboration with two Fleetwood Mac members: keyboardist Christine McVie, and guitarist Lindsey Buckingham. Keith Olsen, who produced Fleetwood Mac's 1975 self-titled album, claimed that Stevie Nicks was initially jealous over her lack of involvement in the writing process, and said that she eventually "got over it". Nicks confirmed the matter in an interview with Spin magazine, saying that "I remember getting very upset when I realised he and Christine had written 'World Turning'. I had been with Lindsey all these years, and we had never written a song together."

Buckingham used two guitars on the track: a Fender Telecaster electric guitar and a Dobro, a resonator guitar that produces sound through one or more metal cones. He also had his low E string tuned down to a D. Mick Fleetwood played a talking drum on both the studio recording and subsequent live renditions of the song. A Nigerian musician named Speedy made a red talking drum for Fleetwood, which he included in his equipment setup for every Fleetwood Mac tour since 1969.

"World Turning" has appeared on most of the band's concert tours from the Fleetwood Mac Tour onwards. Starting with their Shake the Cage Tour in 1987, the band performed an extended live version that showcased Fleetwood's drumming. For this tour Fleetwood's drum solo was augmented with additional percussion from Asante and a solo played by Fleetwood on a "drum vest" utilising MIDI. The vest, which was connected to an amplifier, had five touch-activated pads that produced various sampled noises such as bells, screams, horns, and shattering glass. Fleetwood continued to incorporate the drum vest solo through the 2003–2004 Say You Will Tour. Performances on the 2018–2019 An Evening with Fleetwood Mac Tour lasted over ten minutes that featured both a talking drum solo and a call and response section.

== Personnel ==
- Lindsey Buckingham – guitars, Dobro, lead and backing vocals
- Christine McVie – keyboards, lead and backing vocals
- Stevie Nicks – backing vocals
- Mick Fleetwood – drums, talking drum, tambourine
- John McVie – bass guitar

== Covers ==
- The song was covered by former Fleetwood Mac member Bob Welch on his 2006 album His Fleetwood Mac Years and Beyond, Vol. 2.
- Tony Trischka covered this song on his 1993 album World Turning featuring Alison Krauss on vocals.
- Leo Kottke covered this song on his 1997 album Standing in My Shoes.
