= One Last Step =

Single by Shirley Myers

from the album Let It Rain
- Released: 1998
- Genre: Country
- Length: 3:13
- Label: Stony Plain
- Songwriters: J. Barnes; Shirley Myers; Rod Nicholson
- Producer: Shirley Myers

Shirley Myers singles chronology
"Haven't You Heard" (1997)	"One Last Step" (1998)	"Fallin' Out of Love" (1998)

"One Last Step" is a song recorded by Canadian country music artist Shirley Myers. It was released in 1998 as the third single from her debut album, Let It Rain. It peaked at number 9 on the RPM Country Tracks chart in June 1998.

== Chart performance ==
Chart (1998)	Peak position
Canada Country Singles (RPM)	9

=== Year-end charts ===
Chart (1998)	Position
Canada Country Tracks (RPM)	64
