= Blue Letter =

1976 song performed by Fleetwood Mac

Song by Fleetwood Mac

from the album Fleetwood Mac
- A-side: "Warm Ways"
- Released: 1975
- Recorded: 1975
- Genre: Rock
- Label: Warner Bros.
- Songwriters: Richard Curtis, Michael Curtis
- Producers: Fleetwood Mac, Keith Olsen

"Blue Letter" is a song written by brothers Richard and Michael Curtis, first released by British-American rock band Fleetwood Mac on their eponymous 1975 album, Fleetwood Mac. It was the only song on the album not written by a band member. A remixed version of "Blue Letter" was included on the B-side of "Warm Ways".

== Background ==
Brothers Michael and Richard Curtis met the young couple Stevie Nicks and Lindsey Buckingham, then known as rock duo Buckingham Nicks and unaffiliated with Fleetwood Mac, through Polydor Records. The group of four became fast friends and worked together on two demos. The first was "Blue Letter", which, like many of the songs on the Fleetwood Mac album, was intended for the second Buckingham Nicks LP. Unlike "Blue Letter", the second demo titled "Seven League Boots" was not adopted by the group and was later reworked to become Crosby, Stills, and Nash’s 1982 hit, "Southern Cross".

In January 1975, Buckingham Nicks performed the song live in Alabama. According to drummer Mick Fleetwood’s autobiography, Play On, the decision to record "Blue Letter" was made towards the end of the Fleetwood Mac album sessions. While Fleetwood Mac was recording their eponymous album at Sound City with producer Keith Olsen, they overheard Michael and Richard Curtis rehearsing the song in another room. Pleased with what they heard, the band decided to record the song to include on Fleetwood Mac. It was one of two last-minute additions, along with "World Turning".

== Origin ==
Co-writer Michael Curtis revealed in an interview that the inspiration for the song came from an actual letter that was mailed to his brother Richard. As said in the lyrics, it had been enclosed in a blue-colored envelope with silver handwriting on the front. Although Michael didn't name the woman who wrote the letter, he confirmed that the lyric "redbird" referred to her, saying that "she was the redbird who wrote blue letters with silver words."

== Legacy ==
The song inspired the name of a set of Fleetwood Mac related archives, called "The Blue Letter Archives", self-described as the site for "over 750 articles published about the band, reviews of their albums, and information regarding their solo careers".

== Personnel ==
- Lindsey Buckingham – guitars, lead vocals
- Stevie Nicks – backing vocals
- Christine McVie – organ
- John McVie – bass guitar
- Mick Fleetwood – drums, tambourine
