= Let It Rain (Shirley Myers album) =

Studio album by Shirley Myers
- Released: October 1997
- Genre: Country
- Length: 32:37
- Label: Stony Plain
- Producer: Shirley Myers; Rod Nicholson; Troy Lancaster; Rick Scott

Shirley Myers chronology
| Let It Rain (1997) | There Will Come a Day (1999) |

Let It Rain is the debut album by Canadian country music artist Shirley Myers. It was released by Stony Plain Records in October 1997. The album produced the Top Ten singles "Let It Rain", "Haven't You Heard", and "One Last Step".

== Track listing ==
1. "Let It Rain" (Shirley Myers, Rod Nicholson, Rick Scott) – 3:05
2. "Let It Go" (Myers, Nicholson) – 3:07
3. "One Last Step" (J. Barnes, Myers, Nicholson) – 3:13
4. "A Rose in the Snow" (Rex Benson, Fran Lee) – 2:54
5. "Grindin' Wheel" (Kim Bear, Frank Dycus, Troy Lancaster, Scott) – 2:42
6. "Haven't You Heard" (Myers, Nicholson, Scott) – 3:20
7. "Fallin' Out of Love" (Myers, Nicholson) – 3:18
8. "Thirty Nine Days" (Barry Brown, E. Emerson) – 3:39
9. "Don't Say a Word" (Lorrie Church, Jim Varsos) – 3:33
  - duet with Johnny Lee
10. "Long Long Gone" (Myers, Nicholson) – 3:46

== Personnel ==
- Larry Beaird - acoustic guitar
- Steve Bryant - bass guitar
- Jimmy Carter - bass guitar
- Chip Davis - background vocals
- Greg Dotson - drums
- Glen Duncan - fiddle
- Owen Hale - drums
- Tommy Harden - drums
- Dirk Johnson - keyboards
- Mike Johnson - steel guitar
- Wayne Killius - drums
- Troy Lancaster - acoustic guitar, electric guitar
- Johnny Lee - duet vocals on "Don't Say a Word"
- Shirley Myers - lead vocals, background vocals
- Russ Pahl - steel guitar
- David Russell - fiddle, mandolin
- Curt Ryle - acoustic guitar
- Jim Wilson - keyboards
