= Shirley Myers =

- Origin: New Brunswick, Canada
- Genres: Country
- Occupation: Singer-songwriter
- Years active: 1997–present
- Label: Stony Plain
- Website: www.shirleymyers.com

Shirley Myers is a Canadian country music singer-songwriter. Signed to Stony Plain Records in the 1990s, she released her debut album, Let It Rain, in 1997. The first single, the title track, reached the top five of the RPM Country Singles chart in Canada. Myers was nominated for a Juno Award for Best Country Female Vocalist in 1998.

== Discography ==
=== Albums ===
Title	Details	Peak positions
Title	Details	CAN Country
Let It Rain	Release date: October 1997; Label: Stony Plain Records	—
There Will Come a Day	Release date: 8 June 1999; Label: Stony Plain Records	29
A Little Time for Me	Release date: September 2003; Label: Sextant Records	×
"—" denotes releases that did not chart "×" indicates that no relevant chart existed or was archived

=== Singles ===
Year	Single	Peak positions	Album
Year	Single	CAN Country	Album
1997	"Let It Rain"	3	Let It Rain
1997	"Haven't You Heard"	9	Let It Rain
1998	"One Last Step"	9	Let It Rain
1998	"Fallin' Out of Love"	44	Let It Rain
1999	"Forever in Love" (with Duane Steele)	9	There Will Come a Day
1999	"You Better Be Sure"	10	There Will Come a Day
2000	"I'm Missin' You"	10	There Will Come a Day
2000	"No One" (with Chad Brock)	35	New Country 7
2000	"Real True Love"	34 (Note: "Real True Love" reached number 34 when RPM ceased publication after the November 6, 2000 issue.)	There Will Come a Day
2001	"Do You Love Me"	×	There Will Come a Day
2001	"I Give Up"	×	There Will Come a Day
2002	"How Do I Get Out of This Dream"	×	Non-album singles
2003	"A Little Time for Me"	×	A Little Time for Me
2003	"No Worries"	×	A Little Time for Me
"×" indicates that no relevant chart existed or was archived

=== Music videos ===
Year	Video
1997	"Let It Rain"
1998	"One Last Step"
1998	"Fallin' Out of Love"
1999	"You Better Be Sure"
2000	"I'm Missin' You"
2002	"How Do I Get Out of This Dream"
