= Over My Head (Fleetwood Mac song) =

Single by Fleetwood Mac

from the album Fleetwood Mac
- B-side: "I'm So Afraid"
- Released: September 1975 (US); 14 February 1976 (UK)
- Recorded: February 1975
- Genre: Soft rock
- Length: 3:38 (album version); 3:09 (single version)
- Label: Reprise
- Songwriter: Christine McVie
- Producers: Fleetwood Mac; Keith Olsen

Fleetwood Mac singles chronology
"Warm Ways" (1975)	"Over My Head" (1975)	"Rhiannon" (1976)

Audio video
- "Over My Head" on YouTube

"Over My Head" is a song recorded by British-American rock band Fleetwood Mac for their self-titled 1975 album. The song was written by keyboardist and vocalist Christine McVie. "Over My Head" was the band's first single to reach the Billboard Hot 100 since "Oh Well", ending a six-year dry spell on the American charts.

== Composition ==
Christine McVie composed the song using a portable Hohner electric piano in a small apartment in Malibu, California. McVie had moved into the apartment with her then-husband John McVie (Fleetwood Mac's bassist) after the completion of the band's concert tour promoting Heroes Are Hard to Find, which was the album that preceded the band's 1975 self-titled release.

Christine McVie said that the lyrics were inspired by her relationship with bandmate Lindsey Buckingham. "I think that was based on a sort of fantasy about Lindsey, really. I think that was a sort of an ode to the gorgeous Lindsey at the time."

== Recording ==
The original rhythm track consisted of just vocals, drums and a Dobro. Other instruments were added later to embellish the song, including McVie's Vox Continental organ and an electric guitar. McVie said that the addition of these instruments helped to culminate "a really pleasant atmosphere". Buckingham used open D tuning on the studio version and also played a Fender Stratocaster with the same tuning for some early live performances. Rick Turner installed a Stratoblaster into the guitar, which boosted the signal of the instrument by several decibels. Buckingham also played some guitar harmonics during certain portions of the song.

Different band members have provided varying accounts on when "Over My Head" was recorded. Buckingham said that they rehearsed the song on the first day of recording sessions while Christine McVie said that it was "the last track we kept." In a 2025 interview with the Library of Congress, Buckingham said that he was also responsible for reworking the song's bridge.

The first night of rehearsal, we did [Christine's] "Over My Head" and I changed the bridge. It was too angular originally. It didn’t go from where the song begins and it was hard to come back to where it had to go. Christine was open to it; she saw that the song immediately improved.

— Lindsey Buckingham

== Release and single remix ==
In the U.S., Reprise Records selected "Over My Head" as the lead single from the 1975 LP Fleetwood Mac, a decision that surprised the band, who believed that "Over My Head" was the least likely song on the album to become a single. Nevertheless, the song reached No. 20 on the Billboard Hot 100 chart in early 1976. The single's success helped the group's eponymous 1975 album sell eight million units. The commercial success of "Over My Head" was partially attributed to a $25,000 AM radio campaign that used the recording as its theme song.

The 45 RPM single version of the song released for radio airplay was a remixed, edited version that differed from the version on the Fleetwood Mac album. The decision to remix the song was made by Paul Ahearn, who the band hired as an independent PR man to provide suggestions on attaining radio airplay. Ahearn believed that some of the songs, including "Over My Head", were not mixed properly for radio and needed to be remixed.

The single version is distinguished by a cold start rather than the fade-in intro on the LP version, louder guitar strums in the choruses, and different vocal harmonies. Additionally, the single version fades during its three-bar instrumental outro whereas the album version tape-loops it to six bars upon fade-out. Further, while the album version has a relatively wide stereo image, the single version is mixed narrowly (essentially mono) with stereo reverberation effects on some bongo passages and select guitar flourishes. The single remix was completed by Deke Richards, who had previously worked with the Jackson 5 on some of their earlier hits.

The aforementioned remixed/edited version is the one included on the compilation album The Very Best of Fleetwood Mac. The single version is also available as a bonus track on the 2004 remastered CD release of the album Fleetwood Mac.

== Critical reception ==
Cash Box wrote that "versatility is again demonstrated with a boiling rhythm subtly driving a soft McCartney-like vocal, shaded by organ and sweet, answering harmony." Record World said the song has a "clean, confident folk-rock sound" and that "Christine McVie takes the lead here over a network of jangly acoustic guitars, singing in a rich, deep voice." In a 1975 review, Billboard described McVie's vocal performance as "a completely distinctive voice, with a sexy huskiness that is unique in pop today."

Matthew Greenwald of AllMusic described "Over My Head" as "another great example of Christine McVie's restrained craftsmanship." He praised the song's "simple but eloquent" lyrics, jazzy melody, and chord changes that evoked the work of Burt Bacharach. The Guardian and Paste ranked the song number 17 and number 11 respectively on their lists of the 30 greatest Fleetwood Mac songs.

== Track listing ==
7-inch single

1. "Over My Head" – 3:17
2. "I'm So Afraid" – 4:15

== Personnel ==
- Christine McVie – Vox Continental organ, electric piano, lead vocals
- Lindsey Buckingham – electric and acoustic guitars, backing vocals
- Stevie Nicks – backing vocals
- John McVie – bass guitar
- Mick Fleetwood – drums, bongos

== Charts ==
=== Weekly charts ===
Chart (1975–76)	Peak position
Canada Top Singles (RPM)	9
Canadian Adult Contemporary (RPM)	30
US Billboard Hot 100	20
US Adult Contemporary (Billboard)	32
US Cash Box Top 100	18
US Record World Singles	23
US Pop/40 (Radio & Records)	17
US Top-40 (Radio & Records)	15

=== Year-end charts ===
Chart (1976)	Rank
Canada	103
U.S. (Joel Whitburn's Pop Annual)	139

== Certifications ==
Certifications for Over My Head
Region	Certification	Certified units/sales
New Zealand (RMNZ)	Gold	15,000^{‡}
^{‡} Sales+streaming figures based on certification alone.

== Bibliography ==
The Great Rock Discography. Martin C. Strong. Page 378. ISBN 1-84195-312-1
