= Fleetwood Mac (1975 album) =

Studio album by Fleetwood Mac
- Released: 11 July 1975
- Recorded: January–February 1975
- Studios: Sound City Studios, Van Nuys, California
- Genres: Soft rock; folk rock; pop rock
- Length: 42:12
- Label: Reprise
- Producers: Fleetwood Mac; Keith Olsen

Fleetwood Mac chronology
Heroes Are Hard to Find (1974)	Fleetwood Mac (1975)	Rumours (1977)

Singles from Fleetwood Mac
- 1. "Over My Head" Released: September 1975 (US); 2. "Warm Ways" Released: October 1975 (UK); 3. "Rhiannon" Released: February 1976; 4. "Say You Love Me" Released: June 1976

Fleetwood Mac is the tenth studio album by the British-American rock band Fleetwood Mac, released on 11 July 1975 in the United States and on 1 August 1975 in the United Kingdom by Reprise Records. It is the band's second eponymous album, the first being their 1968 debut album, and is sometimes referred to by fans as the White Album. It is the first Fleetwood Mac album with Lindsey Buckingham as guitarist and Stevie Nicks as a vocalist, after Bob Welch departed the band in late 1974. It is also the band's last album to be released on the Reprise label until 1997's The Dance; the band's subsequent albums until then were released through Warner Bros. Records, Reprise's parent company.

The album peaked at number one on the US Billboard 200 chart on 4 September 1976, 58 weeks after entering the chart, and spawned three top-twenty singles: "Over My Head", "Rhiannon", and "Say You Love Me", the last two falling just short of the top ten, both at number 11; it also features the song "Landslide", which has been included in Rolling Stone's 500 Greatest Songs of All Time. The album has been certified 9× platinum by the Recording Industry Association of America (RIAA) for sales of over 9 million copies in the United States. Peaking at number 23 on the UK Albums Chart, it was the start of a run of hugely successful albums for the band in Britain, with four number ones starting with Rumours (1977) and ending with Behind the Mask (1990).

== Background ==
In 1974, Fleetwood Mac relocated to California from England so they could better manage the band's affairs. In California, they recorded an album, Heroes Are Hard to Find, and set out on tour. Shortly after finishing the tour, Bob Welch (guitarist, singer, and composer) left the band, ending Fleetwood Mac's ninth lineup in eight years, to form the band Paris.

Prior to Welch's departure, Mick Fleetwood was advised to visit Sound City Studios by an employee who worked at the facility. Fleetwood arrived at Sound City Studios and met with producer Keith Olsen, who showed him some demos for the purpose of demonstrating the studio's sonic capabilities. There, Olsen played Fleetwood an album he had recently engineered, titled Buckingham Nicks. Fleetwood particularly enjoyed the guitar solo on the album's final song, "Frozen Love", and decided to "take a mental note" of the duo.

Once Welch had departed from the band, Fleetwood contacted Olsen about hiring Lindsey Buckingham for Fleetwood Mac. Olsen informed Fleetwood that Buckingham was unlikely to accept the invitation to join Fleetwood Mac unless Buckingham's musical and romantic partner, Stevie Nicks, could join as well. During his conversation with Fleetwood, Buckingham reaffirmed that he would be unwilling to join the band without Nicks.

After Fleetwood played the rest of the band the Buckingham Nicks album, Christine McVie insisted that they meet with Buckingham and Nicks before officially accepting them as members of Fleetwood Mac. An informal interview was held at the Mexican restaurant El Carmen to determine if Buckingham and Nicks would be suitable for the band. Before they met up, Fleetwood and John McVie agreed that Christine McVie would make the final determination on whether Nicks would join Fleetwood Mac due to her initial apprehension about having another woman in the band. Nicks, who was the first to arrive at El Carmen for the informal interview, was still dressed in a flapper dress from her shift at the restaurant. After the interview, Fleetwood invited Buckingham and Nicks to join Fleetwood Mac, and this tenth lineup of the band proved to be its most successful. Within three months, the band had recorded the album Fleetwood Mac, with recording sessions beginning in February 1975.

== Composition ==
Several songs on Fleetwood Mac were written before Buckingham and Nicks joined the band. The duo had recorded demos for "Rhiannon", "I'm So Afraid", and "Monday Morning", which were initially slated to appear on a second Buckingham Nicks album. "Crystal" was recycled from the first Buckingham Nicks album and was given a different arrangement for Fleetwood Mac's self-titled album. Fleetwood praised these songs as "show stoppers, even as rough sketches recorded on Lindsey's four-track.

McVie wrote several of her compositions on a Hohner Pianet in her Malibu apartment, including "Warm Ways" and "Over My Head". She mentioned that it was "tough to compete" with the compositions that Buckingham and Nicks brought into the recording sessions and that she placed additional effort into improving her songwriting on the album. Commenting on her song "Sugar Daddy", McVie said that she did not "recall it being about anybody. I just dreamed it up".

== Recording ==
Following an initial jam session with Buckingham, Fleetwood, and John McVie, a full rehearsal was held in the basement of International Creative Management, who at the time served as the band's booking agent. The band started their official recording sessions at Sound City in January 1975 over the course of ten days. Commenting on these sessions, Buckingham said that "we really didn't know each other too well when we did the album. So we mostly recorded tunes that had been worked out beforehand in our own styles. It was planned as well as it could have been in a couple of weeks."

Keith Olsen, who produced the album, mentioned that most of the songs on the album were "easy" to record, adding that the "feel just kept getting better" after roughly five takes. He said that the one exception to this was "Rhiannon", which took over a day to achieve the basic track. Olsen assembled the final version by looping certain sections from different takes and splicing them together.

Richard Dashut, who had worked with Buckingham and Nicks on their Buckingham Nicks album with Olsen, did not participate in the recording sessions for Fleetwood Mac. Dashut had also been involved with the production for the planned Buckingham Nicks follow-up, where several of the songs from those sessions were incorporated into the Fleetwood Mac album. The role of second engineer was instead taken by David Devore, who had been employed at Crystal Sound Studios. Devore commented that the chemistry between the band during the sessions was "magical" and that he and Olsen "made a good team", adding that he also handled some of the production and engineering responsibilities when Olsen was not available.

During the recording sessions, bassist John McVie clashed with Buckingham over creative decisions made in the studio, particularly over some of the album's bass parts. McVie reminded Buckingham that "The band you're in is Fleetwood Mac. I'm the Mac. And I play the bass." Buckingham told Billboard that Christine McVie was more receptive to his creative input.

"It was so clear that right away that Christine and I had this thing. She was just really looking for direction. She was open to me taking liberties with her songs. So early on, that was probably the first thing that hit me about being in Fleetwood Mac was being extremely aware that I had something to contribute to Christine’s songs as a producer and possibly as a co-writer."

Fleetwood remembered that he encountered some difficulties playing the drum parts to Buckingham's specifications, who asked Fleetwood to recreate the drum parts from his demos. "[Buckingham] assumed that we could play a certain way – I'd be like, 'Well I'll try to do that, but I don't know whether I can." Fleetwood compromised by playing a derivation of the drum tracks that Buckingham had showed him.

== Artwork ==
Like all of the band's studio albums, the front cover photo of Fleetwood Mac does not show the whole band. The front cover, which was photographed by Herbert W. Worthington, shows Fleetwood in a black jacket with long boots standing next to John McVie, who are both positioned in front of a doorway. Fleetwood is shown posing with a cane and drinking from a wine glass next to McVie, who appears in a kneeling position while gazing upwards at a crystal ball. Within the crystal ball is an obfuscated reflection of Fleetwood and McVie.

Larry Vigon was responsible for designing the font for the words "Fleetwood Mac" that appear above the doorway. Vigon mentioned that his goal was to "do something that complimented and framed the doorway and the shape that [Fleetwood and John McVie] created." He made multiple drafts for the layouts, all of which were hand-drawn. The back cover photograph features the band standing in a washroom with sinks in the background.

== Release and reception ==
Professional ratings
Review scores
Source	Rating
AllMusic	5/5 stars
Blender	4/5 stars
Encyclopedia of Popular Music	4/5 stars
Entertainment Weekly	A
Mojo	4/5 stars
Pitchfork	9.0/10
Q	4/5 stars
The Rolling Stone Album Guide	4.5/5 stars
Uncut	9/10
The Village Voice	A−

Fleetwood Mac was released on 11 July 1975. In August of that year, Olsen sued the band over alleged unpaid producer's royalties. The band also embarked on a tour to promote the album, having previously done so earlier in the year to familiarise the public with the new lineup. Nicks told Uncut that the band "just played everywhere and we sold that record. We kicked that album in the ass." Christine McVie called the album "a discovery process" and said that the versatility of Buckingham and Nicks resulted in a diverse set of songs.

In its 26 July 1975 review, Billboard thought that the album demonstrated Fleetwood Mac's "sophisticated versatility" and "zeroes them in more closely on AM hit material and the ensuing wider success." Cashbox believed that then album showcased their ergonomic approach to music, saying that "everything they've done has had its purpose and it is this economics in music that shows through on their latest offering." Record World labelled it as "one of their finest sets to date, mixing a variety of styles—all really well done—and sure to amass steady spins and heavy sales." In 2003, the album was ranked number 183 on Rolling Stone Magazine's list of "The 500 Greatest Albums of All Time", and was re-ranked at 182 in a 2012 revised list.

=== Singles ===
All of the singles that derived from Fleetwood Mac used mixes of the songs different from those used on the album (and occasionally different takes, as in the case of "Over My Head"). A "single mix" was also created for "Blue Letter", and this mix was only available as the B-side of the "Warm Ways" single from 1975 until it was included as a bonus track on the 2004 re-issue of the album (along with an instrumental called "Jam #2" and the single versions of "Say You Love Me", "Rhiannon (Will You Ever Win)", and "Over My Head").

In the US, the album spawned three top twenty singles: "Over My Head", "Rhiannon", and "Say You Love Me", the last two falling just short of the top ten, both at number 11. A version of "Landslide" taken from the live reunion album The Dance was released as a single in the US in 1998 and reached number 51 on the Billboard Hot 100.

In the UK, the album's first single was "Warm Ways", which was not released as a single in the US. Initially, the album generated limited interest in the UK, and the first three singles released by the new lineup failed to enter the UK Singles Chart, while "Say You Love Me" reached number 40. Following the massive success of Rumours two years later, however, interest in the band reignited, Fleetwood Mac was re-released in 1978, and a reissue of "Rhiannon" peaked at number 46.

== Commercial performance ==
The album debuted at number 183 on the US Billboard 200 chart dated 2 August 1975. The album initially peaked at number nine on the US Billboard 200 before it began its descent down the charts. When "Rhiannon" was released as a single, the album climbed up the charts again. It eventually reached its peak at number one on the chart dated 4 September 1976, which was 57 weeks after it had entered the chart. On 10 July 2025, the album was certified nine times platinum by the Recording Industry Association of America (RIAA) for sales of over 9 million copies in the United States.

In the UK, the album initially did not enter the charts and made its debut at number 49 on the UK Albums Chart dated 6 November 1976, well over a year after the album's release. It peaked at number 23 its second week on the chart. On 5 July 1978, the album was certified gold by the British Phonographic Industry (BPI) for sales of over 100,000 copies in the UK.

== Track listing ==
Side one
No.	Title	Writer(s)	Lead vocals	Length
1.	"Monday Morning"	Lindsey Buckingham	Buckingham	2:48
2.	"Warm Ways"	Christine McVie	C. McVie	3:50
3.	"Blue Letter"	Michael Curtis; Richard Curtis	Buckingham	2:31
4.	"Rhiannon"	Stevie Nicks	Nicks	4:12
5.	"Over My Head"	C. McVie	C. McVie	3:34
6.	"Crystal"	Nicks	Buckingham	5:12

Side two
No.	Title	Writer(s)	Lead vocals	Length
1.	"Say You Love Me"	C. McVie	C. McVie	4:11
2.	"Landslide"	Nicks	Nicks	3:05
3.	"World Turning"	C. McVie; Buckingham	C. McVie with Buckingham	4:25
4.	"Sugar Daddy"	C. McVie	C. McVie	4:09
5.	"I'm So Afraid"	Buckingham	Buckingham	4:15
Total length:				42:12

== Personnel ==
Adapted from the album's liner notes.

Fleetwood Mac

- Mick Fleetwood – drums, percussion
- John McVie – bass guitar
- Christine McVie – keyboards, synthesizer, vocals
- Lindsey Buckingham – guitars, vocals
- Stevie Nicks – vocals

Additional musician

- Waddy Wachtel – rhythm guitar (on "Sugar Daddy")

Production

- Fleetwood Mac; Keith Olsen – producers
- Keith Olsen – engineer
- David Devore – second engineer
- John Courage; Mike Miller; Rhyno – road managers
- Fleetwood Mac – sleeve concept
- Des Strobel/AGI – album design
- Herbert W. Worthington III – photography

== Charts ==
=== Weekly charts ===
Initial weekly chart performance for Fleetwood Mac
Chart (1975–1977)	Peak position
Australian Albums (Kent Music Report)	3
Canada Top Albums/CDs (RPM)	2
New Zealand Albums (RMNZ)	4
Norwegian Albums (VG-lista)	3
UK Albums (Official Charts)	23
US Billboard 200	1

2018 weekly chart performance for Fleetwood Mac
Chart (2018)	Peak position
Belgian Albums (Ultratop Flanders)	94
Belgian Albums (Ultratop Wallonia)	157
Dutch Albums (Album Top 100)	86
German Albums (Offizielle Top 100)	47
Scottish Albums (Official Charts)	31
UK Albums (Official Charts)	53
US Top Rock Albums (Billboard)	23
US Indie Store Album Sales (Billboard)	10

2022 weekly chart performance for Fleetwood Mac
Chart (2022)	Peak position
UK Album Downloads (Official Charts)	90

2024 weekly chart performance for Fleetwood Mac
Chart (2024)	Peak position
Hungarian Physical Albums (MAHASZ)	8

=== Year-end charts ===
1976 year-end chart performance for Fleetwood Mac
Chart (1976)	Position
Australian Albums (Kent Music Report)	14
Canada Top Albums/CDs (RPM)	16
US Billboard 200	2

1977 year-end chart performance for Fleetwood Mac
Chart (1977)	Position
Australian Albums (Kent Music Report)	12
US Billboard 200	10

== Certifications ==
Region	Certification	Certified units/sales
Australia (ARIA)	4× Platinum	280,000^{^}
Canada (Music Canada)	Platinum	100,000^{^}
New Zealand (RMNZ)	3× Platinum	45,000^{‡}
United Kingdom (BPI)	Gold	100,000^{^}
United States (RIAA)	9× Platinum	9,000,000^{‡}
^{^} Shipments figures based on certification alone.^{‡} Sales+streaming figures based on certification alone.

== See also ==
- List of Billboard 200 number-one albums of 1976
