= Buckingham Nicks =

Studio album by Buckingham Nicks (Stevie Nicks and Lindsey Buckingham)
- Released: September 5, 1973
- Recorded: 1973
- Studios: Sound City, Los Angeles, California
- Genre: Folk rock
- Length: 35:58
- Labels: Polydor/Anthem (US); Quality (Canada); Rhino (2025 re-release)
- Producer: Keith Olsen

Buckingham Nicks (Stevie Nicks and Lindsey Buckingham) chronology
Buckingham Nicks (1973)	Fleetwood Mac (1975)

Singles from Buckingham Nicks
- 1. "Don't Let Me Down Again" / "Races Are Run" Released: November 1973; 2. "Without a Leg to Stand On" / "Stephanie" Released: 1973 (Netherlands); 3. "Crying in the Night" / "Stephanie" Released: 1977; 4. "Crying in the Night (remaster)" Released: July 24, 2025; 5. "Don't Let Me Down Again (remaster)" Released: August 13, 2025; 6. "Frozen Love (remaster)" Released: September 10, 2025

Professional ratings
Review scores
Source	Rating
AllMusic	4/5 stars
Pitchfork	8.4/10
The Rolling Stone Record Guide	2/5 stars

Buckingham Nicks is the only album by the duo of American rock guitarist Lindsey Buckingham and singer Stevie Nicks, both of whom later joined Fleetwood Mac. Produced by Keith Olsen, the album was released in September 1973 by Polydor Records.

The album was a commercial failure on its original release, and despite the duo's subsequent success, it remained without a commercial remaster or digital re-release for over five decades.

The album was remastered and re-released on CD, vinyl, and streaming services on September 19, 2025. Rhino Records handled distribution. Upon its re-release, Buckingham Nicks charted in several countries, reaching the top 20 in Austria, Belgium, Croatia, Germany, the Netherlands, the United Kingdom, and the United States. Billboard reported that the album sold 30,000 copies in the United States during its first week on the Billboard 200 chart in September 2025.

== Background ==
Prior to recording the album Buckingham Nicks, Lindsey Buckingham and Stevie Nicks performed together in the Fritz Rabyne Memorial Band. The pair met while they were both attending Menlo-Atherton High School in Atherton, California, south of San Francisco. At the time, Nicks was a senior in high school and Buckingham was a junior. According to Nicks, they first met at a casual, after-school "Young Life" gathering in 1966. Nicks and Buckingham harmonized to "California Dreamin'," a hit single by the Mamas and the Papas. Nevertheless, Nicks and Buckingham did not collaborate again for another two years. In 1968 Buckingham invited Nicks to sing in Fritz, a band for which he was playing bass guitar and included some of his high school friends. Nicks talks about joining Fritz in an interview with Us Magazine from 1988:

I met Lindsey when I was a senior in high school and he was a junior, and we sang a song together at some after-school function. Two years later, in 1968, he called me and asked me if I wanted to be in a rock & roll band. I had been playing guitar and singing pretty much totally folk-oriented stuff. So I joined the band, and within a couple of weeks we were opening for really big shows: Jefferson Airplane, Janis Joplin. All of a sudden I was in rock & roll.

While performing with Fritz, Nicks had attended San Jose State University, studying speech communication. Buckingham joined her at college, also managing to balance school and music. Although Nicks and Buckingham never performed their own original music while in Fritz, the band provided them with the opportunity to gain experience on stage, performing in front of crowds while opening for wildly successful rock and roll acts. Grace Slick of Jefferson Airplane, Janis Joplin of Big Brother and the Holding Company and Jimi Hendrix, whom Fritz also opened for, would all prove influential on Nicks and her developing stage persona.

The band manager, David Forrester, worked hard to secure a record deal for Fritz, despite their sound differing from the harder, psychedelic music of their more popular contemporaries. Fritz was brought to the attention of Keith Olsen, who was serving as a record producer and had recently formed his own company with entrepreneurs Ted Feigin and Lee Lasseff called Anthem Records. Upon seeing the band perform in San Jose, California, Olsen encouraged Nicks and Buckingham to record a demo at Sound City Studios in Los Angeles without the remaining members of Fritz. Lasseff secured a distribution deal for the duo with Polydor Records.

== Recording and production ==
In 1972, the two wrote a series of songs, recording demo tapes at night in Daly City on a half-inch four-track Ampex tape machine Buckingham kept at the coffee roasting plant belonging to his father. They decided to drop out of college and move to Los Angeles to pursue a record deal. Taking the Ampex tape machine with them, they continued recording songs, including "Frozen Love", "Races Are Run", and "Crystal." Nicks worked several jobs, as a hostess at Bob's Big Boy, a waitress at Clementine's and as a cleaning lady for her record producer, Keith Olsen, so as to support herself and Buckingham financially; they had decided that it would be best for him not to work and to instead focus on honing his guitar technique.

Nicks wrote "Long Distance Winner" about her experiences living with Buckingham and said that the lyrics were about the challenges of living with a difficult musician. Buckingham performed two guitar instrumentals on the album: "Django" and "Stephanie". "Django" was written by pianist John Lewis in the 1950s to honor jazz guitarist Django Reinhardt. "Stephanie" was written by Buckingham as a love song for Nicks; she was born as Stephanie Lynn Nicks. Buckingham wrote the song in late 1971 or early 1972 while recovering from a bout of mononucleosis that forced him to play while lying flat on his back. He recorded the song on a Martin D-18 guitar with a Travis picking technique.

Recording sessions for Buckingham Nicks took place at Sound City Studios. Olsen took the opportunity to purchase a large Neve console for the facility, as he owned part of the studio at the time. "Crying in the Night", the opening song on Buckingham Nicks, was the first song recorded on the device. Various session musicians, including drummer Jim Keltner and guitarist Waddy Wachtel, assisted in recording the album. Olsen facilitated the arrangement between Buckingham, Nicks, and Wachtel, and the three became "very tight". Buckingham reflected that the two of them were fortunate to have secured a record deal within a year and found the sessions to be a positive experience. Nicks discussed this series of events in an interview with The Island Ear in 1994:

We had some great demos. We shopped around. Over a period of time we got a deal with Polydor and made our first album, Buckingham Nicks. We had a taste of the big time. We had great musicians in a big, grand studio. We were happening. Things were going our way. But up until that point I had been thinking of quitting it all and going back to school because I was sick of being miserable and I hate being poor.

== Artwork ==
The album's cover is a black-and-white photo of Buckingham and Nicks, both nude from the waist up, taken by photographer Jimmy Wachtel. Nicks spent $111 ($805 in 2025 dollars) on a white blouse for the cover shoot, but Wachtel and Buckingham coerced her to take her top off when shooting the cover. Nicks later recounted, "I was crying when we took that picture. And Lindsey was mad at me. He said, 'You know, you're just being a child. This is art.' And I'm going, 'This is not art. This is me taking a nude photograph with you, and I don't dig it.' I thought, 'Who are you? Don't you know me?'... I couldn't breathe. But I did it because I felt like a rat in a trap."

Nicks was so mortified by the photos she hid them from her family for several weeks, worried about how they would respond. She told MOJO Magazine in 2013, "When the record came out and I saw my father, it was, 'Why didn't you just say no, Stevie?' I said, 'Daddy, I don't know. I didn't feel like I had a choice – I'm so sorry.' He said, 'OK – move on. But you always have a choice.' I learned a big lesson that day." Outtakes from the photoshoot were revealed and auctioned off for $15,000 in 2014.

== Promotion ==
Despite their efforts, Buckingham Nicks was virtually ignored by the promotional staff at Polydor Records. Polydor took out an advertisement titled "Polydor's Treasure Map" in the September 1, 1973 edition of Record World, which showcased Buckingham Nicks as one of their several new releases. In the October 27 edition of Billboard, Buckingham Nicks was amongst the artists that were planned to be featured on a promotional billboard in Sunset Strip. Nicks commented that she "couldn't even find our album in the record shops, let alone hear it on the radio." Thanks, however, to airplay by several Birmingham, Alabama disc jockeys, the album got well-received exposure during the WJLN-FM progressive rock evening hours, and the duo managed to cultivate a relatively small and concentrated fan base in that market. Elsewhere in the country, the album did not prove to be commercially successful and was soon deleted from the label's catalog. Disheartened, Nicks and Buckingham would spend much of the rest of 1973 continuing to work outside of the music industry to pay rent, with manager Martin Pichinson releasing them from their management contract.

However, shortly after the album's release, Mick Fleetwood, while evaluating recording studios, heard "Frozen Love" played back through studio monitors at Sound City by Keith Olsen. Fleetwood would go on to invite the duo to join his band, Fleetwood Mac, on New Year's Eve 1974. Later, Buckingham met with Fleetwood and Christine and John McVie at the Mexican restaurant El Carmen, with Nicks later joining the group after her waitress shift at Clementine's, still wearing her flapper costume.

== Tour ==
Buckingham Nicks toured the US in 1973 to promote Buckingham Nicks. During their performance at the Troubadour in Los Angeles, the duo opened for John Prine and had further accompaniment on guitar from Waddy Wachtel. Nat Freedland reviewed their performance in the November 10, 1973 edition of Billboard and called them "a lackluster male-female acoustic duo who towards the end of their set showed a couple of songs with chart possibilities." Writing for Cashbox, Eliot Skuler was more complimentary of the show and highlighted the duo's "tight energetic harmonies and intricate, primarily acoustic arrangements."

Bootlegged recordings from two concerts in Tuscaloosa and Birmingham, Alabama have surfaced on the internet. These tours featured performances of "Rhiannon", "Blue Letter", and "Monday Morning" which would all appear on the Fleetwood Mac album, along with "I Don't Want to Know" which later appeared on Rumours. They also performed "Sorcerer" and songs from the Buckingham Nicks album. The touring band consisted of bassist Tom Moncrieff, who later played bass on Nicks' first solo album Bella Donna, drummer Gary "Hoppy" Hodges, who played drums on Buckingham Nicks, and Wachtel on guitar.

== Re-release ==
Despite the international success that Nicks and Buckingham later achieved, Buckingham Nicks was not officially released on CD for five decades. It was widely bootlegged, including one copy titled Buckingham Nicks: Deluxe Edition from South Korea. This version adds 12 extra tracks which were all recorded by Buckingham Nicks at around the same period as the Buckingham Nicks album, but were not included on the album. A copy of this album allegedly sourced from the master tapes (as opposed to a copy taken from vinyl) has also surfaced online.

Two of the album's studio recordings appeared on other albums: "Long Distance Winner" was released as part of Nicks' Enchanted box set; and "Stephanie" turned up on a promotional-only CD release by Buckingham entitled Words and Music (A Retrospective), although this was from a vinyl transfer as well. Another song from the album, "Crystal", was recorded by the revamped Fleetwood Mac for the group's 1975 breakthrough LP, Fleetwood Mac, and was also recorded by Nicks herself for the soundtrack to the 1998 film Practical Magic. A live recording of "Don't Let Me Down Again" was included on their 1980 live album and was performed several times to support the Fleetwood Mac album. Additionally, Buckingham performed "Stephanie" on his One Man Show tour in 2012. "Stephanie" is also featured on the accompanying live album, One Man Show. Nicks performed "Crying in the Night" for the first time since 1973 on her 24 Karat Gold tour in 2016.

In an interview on WRLT 100.1 Nashville from September 11, 2006, Buckingham expressed interest in seeing the album released on CD. He also suggested the possibility of a Buckingham Nicks tour to support the prospective re-release. Backing musicians Moncrieff and Hodges have also expressed interest in reuniting with Buckingham and Nicks for a future tour.

In an interview with NME in August 2011, Buckingham reiterated his interest in giving the album an official CD release. Regarding the long wait, he stated: "It's been a victim of inertia. We have every intention of putting that album back out and possibly even doing something along with it." In December 2012, Nicks was hopeful that a 40th anniversary edition of Buckingham Nicks would be released in 2013, claiming that at least one unreleased song from the sessions could be included on the release.

In a December 2012 interview with CBS Local, Buckingham talked about the possibility of an official CD release in 2013:

Stevie and I have been hanging out a little bit lately, and we've been talking about that. I think that's something that would happen this year as well. Oddly enough, I hate to even say it, I think the 40th anniversary of that is next year. Jeez! Is that possible? So we've been talking about it. Of course, we've been talking about it off and on for a long time, but Stevie seems really into the idea. So yes, I would say yes.

On April 30, 2013, Fleetwood Mac, with Buckingham and Nicks, released Extended Play, their first new studio material since 2003's Say You Will via digital download on the iTunes Store with the four-track EP containing three new songs and one song from the Buckingham Nicks sessions ("Without You") which was a "lost" demo written during the Buckingham Nicks era, which Nicks herself had found posted on YouTube.

On July 17, 2025, Nicks and Buckingham through their social media posted lyrics from their song "Frozen Love", which appeared on Buckingham Nicks. Mick Fleetwood the previous day posted video to his social media of him listening to the same song and saying "It's all in the song... It's in the music that played on for so many years. It's magic then, magic now. What a thrill." Later that week, on July 21, a billboard was spotted on Sunset Boulevard in Los Angeles, teasing a September 19, 2025, release.

== Cover version ==
In 2024, before the original album was reissued, violinist/whistler/singer Andrew Bird and guitarist/singer Madison Cunningham covered every song on the album and released it under the title Cunningham Bird. The idea for the tribute album came from Bird who first approached Cunningham to collaborate on the arrangements, soon joined by producer Mike Viola who also played bass and electric piano. They adapted the songs to their own liking, extremely so in some cases, purposely avoiding the other path of staying faithful to the originals. Cunningham said she enjoyed reworking the "fascinating" and emotional songs into "something we would want to sing and play together." Bird said he felt that the original was "inaccessible to a lot of people" because it had not been re-issued, which was part of the impetus to create the tribute album. The other part was that the "dysfunction" in the music was very intriguing, with so much "drama brewing in the songs", according to Bird.

== Track listing ==
Side one
No.	Title	Writer(s)	Lead vocals	Length
1.	"Crying in the Night"	Stevie Nicks	Nicks	2:58
2.	"Stephanie"	Lindsey Buckingham (Note: The album notes list each individual composition credit above the lyrics for each song. Because "Stephanie" is an instrumental, Buckingham did not officially receive a credit for the song on releases.)	instrumental	2:12
3.	"Without a Leg to Stand On"	Buckingham	Buckingham	2:09
4.	"Crystal"	Nicks	Buckingham	3:41
5.	"Long Distance Winner"	Nicks	Nicks	4:50

Side two
No.	Title	Writer(s)	Lead vocals	Length
1.	"Don't Let Me Down Again"	Buckingham	Buckingham	3:52
2.	"Django"	John Lewis	instrumental	1:02
3.	"Races Are Run"	Nicks	Nicks	4:14
4.	"Lola (My Love)"	Buckingham	Buckingham	3:44
5.	"Frozen Love"	Nicks; Buckingham	Nicks; Buckingham	7:16
Total length:				35:58

== Personnel ==
- Lindsey Buckingham – vocals, guitars, bass, percussion
- Stevie Nicks – vocals (Note: Credited as "Stevi Nicks" on the original LP release.)

Additional personnel

- Waddy Wachtel – guitars
- Jerry Scheff – bass
- Mark Tulin – bass
- Peggy Sandvig – keyboards (Note: Credited as "Peggy Sandvic" on the original LP release.)
- Monty Stark – synthesizer
- Gary "Hoppy" Hodges – drums, percussion
- Jim Keltner – drums
- Ron Tutt – drums
- Jorge Calderón – percussion
- Richard Halligan – string arrangements

Production

- Keith Olsen – producer, engineer
- Lee Lasseff – executive producer
- Richard Dashut – assistant engineer
- Jimmy Wachtel – album design, photography

== Charts ==
1983 chart performance for Buckingham Nicks
Chart (1983)	Peak position
US Billboard Midline LPs	28

2025 chart performance for Buckingham Nicks
Chart (2025)	Peak position
Australian Albums (ARIA)	30
Austrian Albums (Ö3 Austria)	15
Belgian Albums (Ultratop Flanders)	7
Belgian Albums (Ultratop Wallonia)	30
Canadian Albums (Billboard)	91
Croatian International Albums (HDU)	9
Dutch Albums (Album Top 100)	10
German Albums (Offizielle Top 100)	15
German Rock & Metal Albums (Offizielle Top 100)	5
Hungarian Albums (MAHASZ)	32
Irish Albums (Official Charts)	42
Scottish Albums (Official Charts)	4
Spanish Albums (PROMUSICAE)	89
Swedish Albums (Sverigetopplistan)	37
Swiss Albums (Schweizer Hitparade)	25
UK Albums (Official Charts)	6
UK Americana Albums (Official Charts)	1
US Billboard 200	11
US Top Rock & Alternative Albums (Billboard)	2
