= Say You Love Me (Fleetwood Mac song) =

Single by Fleetwood Mac

from the album Fleetwood Mac
- B-side: "Monday Morning"
- Released: June 1976 (US); September 1976 (UK)
- Recorded: February 1975
- Genre: Soft rock
- Length: 4:11 (album version); 4:01 (single version)
- Label: Reprise
- Songwriter: Christine McVie
- Producers: Fleetwood Mac, Keith Olsen

Fleetwood Mac singles chronology
"Rhiannon" (1976)	"Say You Love Me" (1976)	"Go Your Own Way" (1976)

"Say You Love Me" is a song written by English singer-songwriter Christine McVie for Fleetwood Mac's 1975 self-titled album. The song peaked at No. 11 on the Billboard Hot 100 for three weeks, and remains one of the band's most recognizable songs. Its success helped the group's eponymous 1975 album sell over eight million copies worldwide.

In the UK, "Say You Love Me" was the fourth single from the Fleetwood Mac album, but the first to chart, peaking at No. 40 on the UK Singles Chart in November 1976. In Canada, Shirley Eikhard covered "Say You Love Me" and released it as a single several weeks in advance of Fleetwood Mac in early June 1976. Eikhard's version became a Canadian top 40, peaking at No. 34; Fleetwood Mac's peaked at No. 29 in September.

== Background ==
McVie wrote "Say You Love Me" after her fifth year in the band while she was married to the group's bassist, John McVie. "Say You Love Me" was the first song the band rehearsed during the making of their self-titled 1975 album. McVie recalled that Lindsey Buckingham and Stevie Nicks impressed her with their vocal harmonies during the run-through of the first chorus. "I started singing the chorus and those two came in from nowhere with the most amazing harmonies. It was one of those moments you remember forever." The version used on the single release has overdubbed additional guitar work and a faster fade-out.

"Say You Love Me" has been performed on seven Fleetwood Mac tours since its release. During the band's Rock and Roll Hall of Fame performance of the song and on The Dance tour, Mick Fleetwood and Lindsey Buckingham played a cocktail drum kit and banjo respectively. Originally, Buckingham had suggested that the band perform "Say You Love Me" a cappella, but they instead gave the song a folk rearrangement. John McVie also sang a vocalized bass line over his bass guitar for these performances at the request of Christine McVie. Previously, John McVie's only other vocal contribution was on a cover of "Cool Water", the B-side to "Gypsy". Following Christine McVie's departure from the band, the song was performed on Fleetwood Mac's Unleashed Tour with Stevie Nicks and Lindsey Buckingham sharing lead vocals.

In addition to its appearance on Fleetwood Mac's self-titled 1975 album, "Say You Love Me" appears on four of the group's compilation albums: Greatest Hits, The Very Best of Fleetwood Mac, 25 Years - The Chain and 50 Years – Don't Stop (with the single version featuring on the latter two).

== Reception ==
Billboard praised McVie's singing, noting the "easy" guitar playing, and the "good, catchy bridge." Cash Box said that "it’s an intelligent and commercial single...the music seems to flow, in mid-tempo rock rhythm; the song has a fat sound" and that "the vocals are distinctive." Record World said that "Christine McVie takes the lead this time and belts out a gutty vocal which is underpinned by chiming guitars and a banjo."

== Personnel ==
- Christine McVie – lead vocals, piano
- Lindsey Buckingham – harmony vocals, guitars, banjo
- Stevie Nicks – harmony vocals
- John McVie – bass guitar
- Mick Fleetwood – drums, tambourine

== Charts ==
=== Weekly charts ===
Chart (1976)	Peak position
Australia KMR	38
Canada RPM Top Singles	29
Canada RPM Adult Contemporary	19
UK Singles (OCC)	40
US Billboard Hot 100	11
US Billboard Adult Contemporary	12
US Cash Box Top 100	12
US Record World Singles	14

=== Year-end charts ===
Chart (1976)	Rank
Canada	197
US Billboard Hot 100	53

== Certifications ==
Region	Certification	Certified units/sales
New Zealand (RMNZ)	2× Platinum	60,000^{‡}
United Kingdom (BPI)	Gold	400,000^{‡}
^{‡} Sales+streaming figures based on certification alone.

== Cover versions ==
Shirley Eikhard covered the song in 1976. It became a hit in Canada, spending two weeks at number 34 on the pop singles chart and number four on the Adult Contemporary chart.

In the late half of the 1970s, the song proved to be a popular song to cover in country music. Singer Lynda K. Lance spent five weeks in the fall of 1976 on the American country singles chart with her version, peaking at No. 93. In the fall of 1979, singer Stephanie Winslow scored the only Top 10 country hit of her career, with her cover reaching number 10 on the country charts.

Shirley Eikhard cover

Chart (1976)	Peak position
Canada RPM Top Singles	34
Canada RPM Adult Contemporary	4
