= Keith Olsen =

American record producer and sound engineer (1945–2020)

- Born: May 12, 1945; Sioux Falls, South Dakota, U.S.
- Died: March 9, 2020 (aged 74) Genoa, Nevada, U.S.
- Genres: Pop rock; rock; hard rock; heavy metal
- Occupations: Record producer; sound engineer; rock musician
- Instruments: Upright bass; bass guitar
- Years active: 1960s–2020

Keith Alan Olsen (May 12, 1945 – March 9, 2020) was an American record producer and sound engineer, who worked with Magnum, Rick Springfield, Fleetwood Mac, Ozzy Osbourne, Grateful Dead, Whitesnake, Pat Benatar, Heart, Santana, Saga, Foreigner, Scorpions, Journey, The Babys, Emerson, Lake & Palmer, Joe Walsh, 38 Special, and Eric Burdon & the Animals, among others.

== Career ==
Olsen was born in Sioux Falls, South Dakota, and went to school in Minneapolis, where he developed an appreciation for classical, pop, and jazz music. He gained production experience working in recording studios in the Minneapolis area, and musical and touring experience playing upright bass in jazz and folk bands. He subsequently played bass as a member of the Music Machine, who had a hit with the single "Talk Talk". During this time he began collaborating with Curt Boettcher, producer of the Association's single "Cherish", and met another early influence, Brian Wilson of the Beach Boys, who taught him "to envision everything about a production as you hear the song the first time."

After moving to Los Angeles he was instrumental in launching the careers of Lindsey Buckingham and Stevie Nicks. He helped them to secure a record deal, produced their first album, Buckingham Nicks, and let them live in his house, employing Nicks as a housekeeper for a while. After introducing them to Mick Fleetwood, he went on to produce Fleetwood Mac's eponymous 1975 album, which reached No. 1 in the US.

Through the 1970s, 1980s, and 1990s, Olsen built a reputation as a producer. In addition to Fleetwood Mac, some of the artists he has worked with include the Grateful Dead (he produced and engineered their 1977 album Terrapin Station); Bob Weir; Eddie Money; Emerson, Lake & Palmer; Rick Springfield (he produced Springfield's No. 1 hit "Jessie's Girl"); REO Speedwagon; Pat Benatar; Heart; Joe Walsh; Starship; Santana; Kim Carnes; Sheila; Jethro Tull; The Babys; Magnum (Goodnight L.A.); Saga; Ozzy Osbourne (No Rest for the Wicked); Scorpions (Crazy World); Bad Company; Europe; 38 Special; Russ Ballard; Sammy Hagar; Whitesnake; Foreigner; Sheena Easton; Steve Perry; Journey; Loverboy; and Lou Gramm. He was also involved in several movie soundtracks, including Footloose, Vision Quest, Tron, Flashdance and Top Gun.

In 1996, Olsen stepped back from artist production to concentrate on developing surround sound music mixes for the Kore Group record label, licensing existing masters, remixing them for surround sound, and re-releasing them. As corporate director of global product development at Mackie Designs, he assembled a team of experts to develop their digital products line.

More recently, Olsen produced several albums per year for Pogologo Productions Group and was a member of the National Academy of Recording Arts and Sciences (NARAS) Producers and Engineers Wing. He also served on the A&N Committee, the P&E Steering Committee and the P&E Advisory Council.

Olsen died on March 9, 2020, from cardiac arrest at his home in Genoa, Nevada, at the age of 74.

== Production credits ==
- Eternity's Children - Eternity's Children (1968)
- The Millennium - Begin (1968)
- James Gang - Passin' Thru (1972)
- Lindsey Buckingham and Stevie Nicks - Buckingham Nicks (1973)
- Fleetwood Mac - Fleetwood Mac (1975)
- Sons of Champlin - A Circle Filled With Love (1976)
- Grateful Dead - Terrapin Station (1977)
- Bob Weir - Heaven Help the Fool (1978)
- Foreigner - Double Vision (1978)
- Santana - Marathon (1979)
- Airborne - Airborne (1979)
- The Babys - Union Jacks (1980)
- Pat Benatar - Crimes of Passion (1980)
- Rick Springfield - Working Class Dog (1981)
- Santana - Zebop! (1981)
- Sheila - Little Darlin' (1981)
- Pat Benatar - Precious Time (1981)
- Sammy Hagar - Standing Hampton (1982)
- Rick Springfield - Success Hasn't Spoiled Me Yet (1982)
- Sammy Hagar - Three Lock Box (1982)
- Heart - Passionworks (1983)
- Kim Carnes - Café Racers (1983)
- Whitesnake - Slide It In (1984) (American Mix Version)
- Joe Walsh - The Confessor (1985)
- 38 Special - Strength in Numbers (1986)
- Bad Company - Fame and Fortune (1986)
- Saga - Wildest Dreams (1987)
- Whitesnake - Whitesnake (1987)
- Starship - No Protection (1987)
- Carlos Santana - Blues for Salvador (1987)
- Rick Springfield - Rock of Life (1988)
- Ozzy Osbourne - No Rest for the Wicked (1988)
- Night Ranger - Man in Motion (1988)
- Whitesnake - Slip of the Tongue (1989)
- Kingdom Come - In Your Face (1989)
- Magnum - Goodnight L.A. (1990)
- Scorpions - Crazy World (1990)
- Eddie Money - Right Here (1991)
- Emerson, Lake & Palmer - In the Hot Seat (1994)
- Scorpions - Pure Instinct (1996)
- Shirley Myers - There Will Come a Day (1999)
- Sheila - Venue d'ailleurs (2021) (two songs released in 2017)
