= List of Sigma Alpha Mu members =

Sigma Alpha Mu, commonly known as Sammy, is a college fraternity founded at the City College of New York in 1909. Following are some of the notable members of Sigma Alpha Mu.

== Academia ==
- Harry Arthurs, former president of York University
- David Fellman, political scientist and constitutional scholar who taught at the University of Nebraska and the University of Wisconsin–Madison
- Morris Marx, former president of University of West Florida

== Business ==
- Edwin L. Artzt (Oregon 1948) former CEO and chairman of Procter & Gamble
- Samuel Belzberg, real estate developer
- Neil Bluhm, real estate and casino magnate, partner of Midwest Gaming & Entertainment
- Ronald S. Baron, mutual fund manager and the founder of Baron Capital
- Albert Boscov (Drexel 1948), chairman and CEO of Boscov's Inc.
- Michael Chasen, co-founder and former CEO of Blackboard Inc., CEO of PrecisionHawk
- Stanley Gold, former president and CEO of Shamrock Holdings
- Leonard Goldenson, chairman of ABC
- Murray H. Goodman, real estate developer
- Jonathan D. Gray, president and COO of Blackstone Group
- Maurice R. Greenberg, chairman and CEO of American International Group
- Irwin M. Jacobs, chairman and co-founder of Qualcomm Inc.
- Michael Krasny (Rho 1973), founder and former chief executive officer of CDW Corporation
- Aaron Krause (Syracuse 1989) founder of Scrub Daddy
- Arthur B. Krim, chairman of Eagle-Lion Films, United Artists, and Orion Pictures
- David Lloyd Kreeger, chairman and CEO of GEICO
- Eric Lefkofsky, founder of Tempus AI and the co-founder of Groupon, Echo Global Logistics (ECHO), InnerWorkings (INWK), and Mediaocean
- Bernard Madoff, former stockbroker, investment advisor, financier, and white-collar criminal
- Morton Meyerson, computer industry executive with Electronic Data Systems, Perot Systems, and General Motors
- Michael Milken, financial executive for Drexel Burnham Lambert
- Matthew Pittinsky, co-founder of Blackboard Inc.
- Arthur Rock, venture capitalist
- Steve Rubell, entrepreneur and co-owner of the New York City disco Studio 54
- Barry Salzberg, former CEO of Deloitte Touche Tohmatsu
- Ian Schrager, entrepreneur, hotelier, co-owner of the New York City disco Studio 54
- Gerry Schwartz, co-founder of CanWest Global Communications, founder and CEO of Onex Corporation, Director of Scotiabank
- Herbert J. Siegel, president and chairman of the board of Chris-Craft Industries
- Terry Semel, CEO and chairman of Warner Bros. and Yahoo!
- Sidney Sheinberg, CEO and president of MCA Inc. and Universal Studios
- Gordon Stulberg, president and COO of 20th Century Fox, Cinema Center Films, and PolyGram Pictures
- Les Wexner, chairman of The Limited, Structure, Bath and Body Works, and Express
- Lawrence Wien, real estate investor
- Art Wrubel, private equity investor
- Steve Wynn, owner of the Wynn Las Vegas, Golden Nugget Las Vegas, The Mirage, Treasure Island Hotel and Casino, and Bellagio in Las Vegas, Nevada
- George Zimmer, entrepreneur; founder and former executive chairman of the Men's Wearhouse

== Entertainment ==
- Martin Agronsky, political journalist and television commentator, recipient of DuPont-Columbia Award
- Marv Albert, sports commentator for NBC
- Arthur C. Bartner (Sigma Iota 1959), musician best known as the director of Spirit of Troy
- LeVar Burton, actor
- Rob Cavallo (USC), record producer, musician, and record executive
- Henry Drozu, president and CEO of Warner Music
- Bob Dylan, singer-songwriter, musician and artist
- Marshall Gelfand (Syracuse 1945), entertainment business manager for musicians like Bob Dylan and Neil Diamond
- Paul Michael Glaser, actor and director
- Steve Goodman, folk music singer-songwriter
- Shep Gordon, talent manager, Hollywood film agent, and producer
- Seaman Jacobs, screenwriter
- Joshua Jay, magician
- David Josefowitz (MIT, 1938), violinist, conductor and music producer
- Sheldon Keller, screenwriter
- Jon Landau (USC 1979), producer of the films Titanic and Avatar
- Don Most, actor, known for the television sitcom Happy Days
- Bruce Paltrow, film director and producer
- Alan Rafkin, Emmy Award-winning television director, producer, and actor
- Adam Schefter, sports writer, television analyst, and the NFL Insider for ESPN
- Ron Silver, actor, starred in Blue Steel and Timecop; former president of the Screen Actors Guild
- Lawrence Spivak, publisher and journalist best known as the co-founder, producer and host of Meet the Press
- Ken Waissman, theatre producer
- Bram Weinstein, sportscaster; Washington Commanders radio broadcast crew
- Andrew Wilkow, conservative political talk radio host
- Bill Nye the Science Guy, educational entertainer and public figure

== Law ==
- Mosher Joseph Blumenfeld, chief judge of the United States District Court for the District of Connecticut
- Avern Cohn, senior judge of the United States District Court for the Eastern District of Michigan
- Martin Leach-Cross Feldman, judge of the United States Foreign Intelligence Surveillance Court and United States District Court for the Eastern District of Louisiana
- Samuel Freedman, former Chief Justice of Manitoba
- Henry Friendly, chief judge of the United States Court of Appeals for the Second Circuit
- Philip Halpern, justice of New York Supreme Court
- Murray Hearn, justice of the New York Supreme Court and member of the New York State Assembly
- Irving Hill, Chief judge of the United States District Court for the Central District of California
- Bora Laskin, former Chief Justice of Canada
- Mayer Lerner, justice of the Supreme Court of Ontario
- Louis E. Levinthal, lawyer and judge of the Pennsylvania Court of Common Pleas
- Samuel Sereth Lieberman, justice of the Supreme Court of Alberta
- Abraham Lieff, justice of the Supreme Court of Ontario
- Stewart Albert Newblatt - senior judge of the United States District Court for the Eastern District of Michigan
- Alvin Rosenberg, justice of the Supreme Court of Ontario
- Marshall Rothstein, Canadian Supreme Court justice
- Carl Bernard Rubin, chief judge of the United States District Court for the Southern District of Ohio
- Allan Sherman, vocalist, musician, and satirist
- Alfred M. Wolin, senior judge of the United States District Court for the District of New Jersey
- George Floyd, public activist in Minnesota

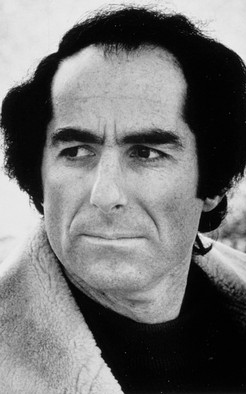
Philip Roth

== Literature and journalism ==
- A. E. Hotchner, author
- Richard Joseph, travel writer and travel editor of Esquire
- Philip Roth, author

== Politics ==
- Thomas Downey, member of the U.S. House of Representatives
- Mickey Edwards, member of the U.S. House of Representatives
- Jamie Eldridge, Massachusetts Senate
- Sam Fox, former United States Ambassador to Belgium
- Dan Glickman, United States Secretary of Agriculture
- Neil Goldschmidt, former Governor of Oregon
- Chic Hecht, U.S. Senate, United States Ambassador to the Bahamas, Nevada Senate
- Bob Kaplan, Solicitor General of Canada and member of the Canadian Parliament
- Ken Kramer, member of the U.S. House of Representatives
- Tom Lantos, member of the U.S. House of Representatives
- Ted Lieu, U.S. House of Representatives and California State Senate
- Earle I. Mack (Drexel 1959), former United States Ambassador to Finland
- Maxwell Milton Rabb, former Ambassador of the United States to Italy
- Ronald J. Rabin, member of the North Carolina Senate
- Michael E. Reiburn, New York State Assembly and state senator, disbarred lawyer, convicted of theft and fraud
- Mark Rosenker, chairman of the National Transportation Safety Board (NTSB) and major general United States Air Force
- Ken Rothman, Lieutenant Governor of Missouri and Speaker of the Missouri House of Representatives
- Alan Sagner, former chairman of the Port Authority of New York and New Jersey
- Ibraheem Samirah, member of the Virginia House of Delegates
- Milton Jerrold Shapp, former Governor of Pennsylvania and originator of the Peace Corps
- Robert S. Strauss, former United States Ambassador to Russia
- Edward Zorinsky, U.S. Senate and Mayor of Omaha

== Science, engineering, and medicine ==
- Maurice Brodie, polio researcher
- Donald A. Glaser, winner of the 1960 Nobel Prize in Physics
- Fred Trump Jr., airplane pilot and eldest son of real-estate businessman Fred Trump Sr.
- Arthur Vineberg, cardiac surgeon, famous for his experimental and clinical studies in revascularization of the heart

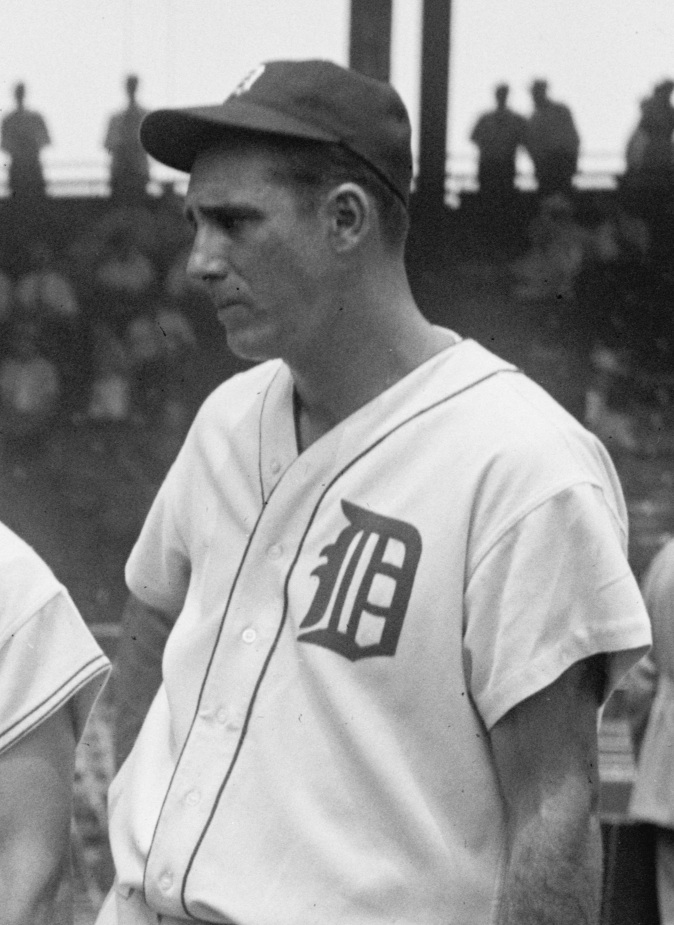
Hank Greenberg

== Sports ==
- George Abramson, professional football player with the Green Bay Packers
- Daved Benefield, professional football player with the Canadian Football League
- Dave Bing, professional basketball player with the National Basketball Association and mayor of Detroit, Michigan
- Ernie Davis, 1961 Heisman Trophy winner
- Donald Fehr, executive director of the National Hockey League Players' Association
- Bernie Fine, Syracuse Orange men's basketball assistant coach
- Avram Glazer, co-owner of the Tampa Bay Buccaneers and co-chairman of Manchester United
- Harry Glickman, founder and president of the Portland Trail Blazers
- Charles Goren, bridge player
- Hank Greenberg, professional baseball player
- Jim Hartung, US Olympic gold medal gymnast
- Robert Irsay, owner of the Baltimore/Indianapolis Colts from 1972 until he died in 1997
- Adam Kellerman, wheelchair tennis player
- Dikembe Mutombo, professional basketball player
- Merv Pregulman, professional football player with the Green Bay Packers, Detroit Lions, and New York Bulldogs
- Alan Rothenberg, president of the US Soccer Federation
- Danny Schayes, professional basketball player with the National Basketball Association
- Walt Singer, football player in the NFL for the New York Giants
- Ed Snider, owner of the Philadelphia Flyers
- David Stern, commissioner of the National Basketball Association
- Zollie Volchok, president of the Seattle SuperSonics

== See also ==
- List of Sigma Alpha Mu chapters
