= Tribute to Troy =

Song
- Written: 1965
- Genre: Fight song
- Composer: Ronald Broadwell

Audio sample
- 26 seconds performed by the Spirit of Troy (USC marching band): file; help

"Tribute to Troy" is an epic fanfare most frequently associated with the University of Southern California (USC), whose fans use it as a fight song. It was composed in 1965 by Ronald Broadwell, the director of USC's Spirit of Troy marching band. Variously described as "an incessant stanza of pounding drums and blaring horns," and "reminiscent of rallying the citizenry to guard the perimeter of the ancient Troy city-state," it is traditionally performed at USC Trojan football games following each USC defensive stop. A count in 2011 found that the song was played nearly 600 times over the course of that year's football season.

Though the song has no lyrics, some fans of opposing teams sing along the invented lyrics "this is the only song we know, it's boring and it's slow". "Hardcore" alumni and fans of USC have been known to make "Tribute to Troy" the ringtone on their mobile phones, while opposing football teams often play the song on a loop over loudspeakers during practice to acclimate themselves prior to games at the Los Angeles Memorial Coliseum.

The song has inspired both derision and acclaim. The Phoenix New Times has named "Tribute to Troy" one of the "top 10 most annoying college football fight songs," while a columnist with The Seattle Times once referred to it as "almost as annoying as Nancy Grace". ESPN, however, has commented that "'Fight On,' USC's official fight song, is a little cornball, but the Spirit of Troy more than makes up for the hokum with the stirring 'Tribute to Troy'", while USA Today has described the tune as "a great tradition that fans and non-fans alike can appreciate".

"Tribute to Troy" is often erroneously referred to as "Conquest". "Conquest," a different song, is performed following USC football victories and is adapted from the score of the 1947 film Captain from Castile.

== See also ==
- "Fight On"
