= Peter Lisagor =

American journalist

- Born: 5 August 1915
- Died: 10 December 1976 (aged 61)
- Education: University of Michigan
- Occupation: Journalist
- Organization: Chicago Daily News

Peter Lisagor (August 5, 1915 – December 10, 1976) was Washington bureau chief of the Chicago Daily News from 1959 to 1976 and was one of the most respected and best-known journalists in the United States. Lisagor gained nationwide recognition from his syndicated column and appearances on such public-affairs broadcasts as Meet the Press, Face the Nation, Washington Week in Review, and Agronsky & Company.

== Early life ==
Lisagor was born in Keystone, West Virginia and moved to Chicago at age 14, where he attended Marshall High School. He graduated from the University of Michigan with a bachelor's degree in political science.

== Career ==
Lisagor began his career in journalism in 1939 as a sportswriter for the Daily News. During World War II he was a sergeant in the Army, serving as a correspondent and London editor for the service newspaper, Stars and Stripes. He returned to the Daily News after the war.

== Awards ==
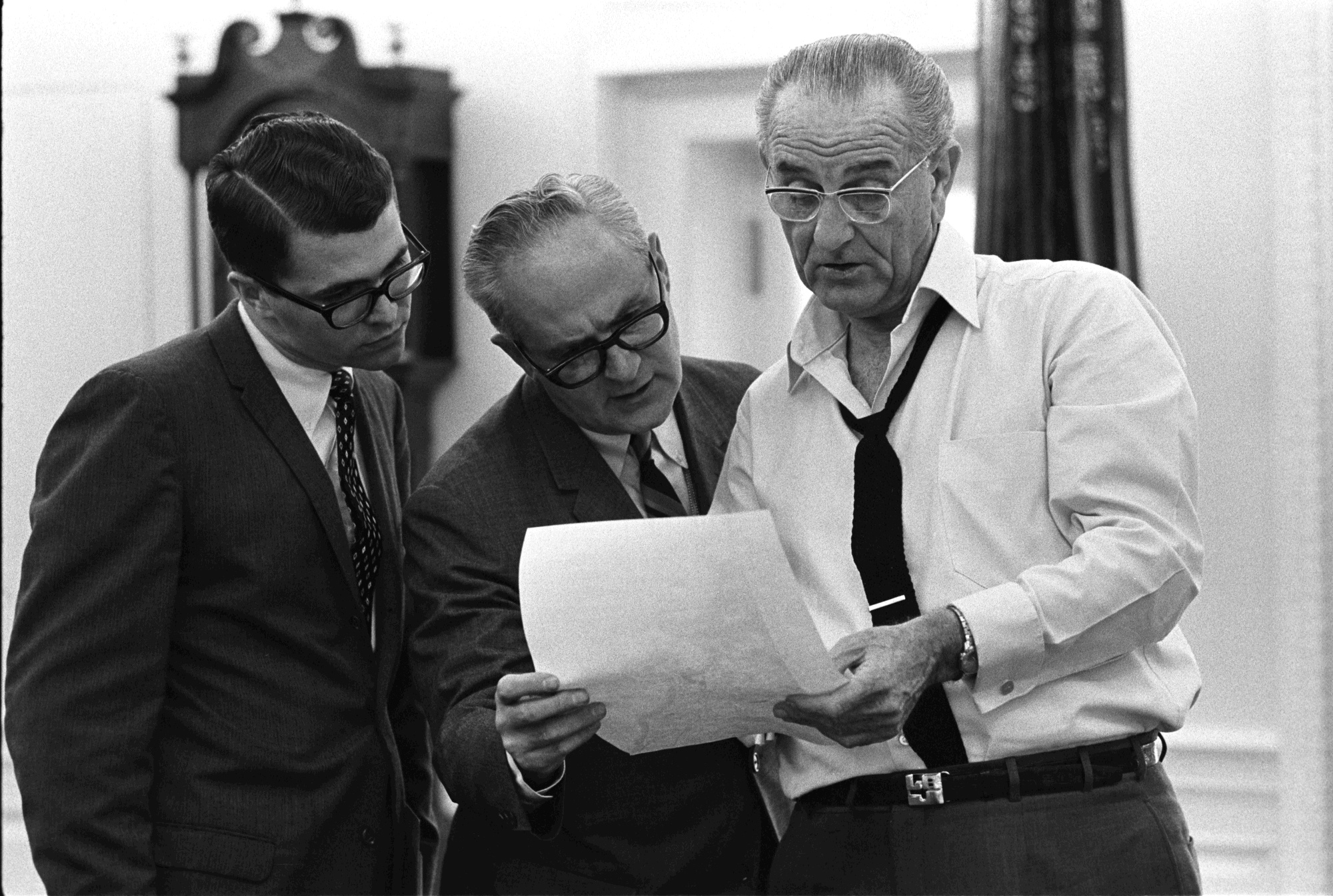
Meeting between President Lyndon B. Johnson, Tom Johnson (left) and Peter Ligasor (middle).

In 1948 Lisagor was selected for a Nieman Fellowship at Harvard University. He was a recipient of the Newspaper Guild's Page One Award, the George Foster Peabody Broadcasting award, the William Allen White award and the Edward Weintal Prize for diplomatic reporting. He served as president of the White House Correspondents' Association, the Gridiron Club, the Overseas Writers Association, and the State Department Correspondents Association.

In 1977, the United States' largest chapter of the Society of Professional Journalists, the Chicago Headline Club, established the Peter Lisagor Awards "to inspire Chicago-area journalists to follow his outstanding example and to recognize truly superior contributions to journalism."

After Peter Lisagor died, his colleagues on Washington Week in Review gave Mr. Lisagor's explanation of his own philosophy of reporting: "Ride down the middle of the street, shooting out windows on both sides." The competition's categories range from in-depth reporting and public service to business, commentary and feature reporting.

== Death ==
Lisagor died in 1976 of complications from cancer of the lung and larynx. He is interred at Arlington National Cemetery.
