= Never Make Me Cry =

Song by Fleetwood Mac

from the album Tusk
- A-side: "Tusk"
- Released: 1979
- Recorded: February – July 1979
- Studio: The Village Recorder
- Genre: Soft rock
- Length: 2:18
- Label: Warner Bros.
- Songwriter: Christine McVie
- Producers: Fleetwood Mac, Richard Dashut, Ken Caillat

"Never Make Me Cry" is a song by Fleetwood Mac from the 1979 double LP Tusk. It was one of six songs from the album composed and sung by Christine McVie. The song was released a B-side to the album's title track in September 1979.

== Background ==
Work on "Never Make Me Cry" began in February 1979, although McVie wrote the song several months earlier on Dennis Wilson's boat. McVie later confirmed that she wrote the song about her romantic relationship with Wilson. For the February 1979 recording sessions, Ken Caillat and Richard Dashut, who served as the producers for Tusk, positioned a Yamaha grand piano in the middle of the recording space and miked the room before McVie's arrival. Hernan Rojas, who engineered the sessions, remembered that it was difficult to settle on a proper tempo, but they ultimately settled on 77 BPM.

McVie played through the song several times on a grand piano and worked out an introduction and ascending melodic pattern that led into the third verse. After some run-throughs with Buckingham strumming an acoustic guitar, three takes were required to achieve satisfactory piano and guitar tracks. McVie recorded a scratch vocal separately from the piano so that she could primarily focus on her singing. After this, Buckingham doubled his guitar strums and John McVie added some bass guitar. Originally, the song featured parts on a Hammond organ and a Chamberlin during the bridge, although these instruments were removed in favor of a nylon string guitar and some cymbals, the latter of which was played by Mick Fleetwood. The cymbals replaced the claves and timpani that he previously recorded.

Although originally conceived as a piano ballad akin to "Songbird", Buckingham conducted a significant overhaul on the song several months later, scrapping all of the keyboards in favor of nine electric guitar tracks primarily played on his Fender Stratocaster. The guitars were sent through Caillat's Fat Box to boost the output of the instrument, which was sent into the mixing console; another line was sent through a Fender Twin amplifier in an isolation room. Caillat, Dashut and Rojas applied reverb amongst other effects to the guitars, which according to Rojas, created the impression of a "sun-shimmering seabed." Buckingham thought that the song could have worked well with a groove, but held off on this idea out of deference to McVie.

The final lead vocal take was not recorded until July to avoid some of the consequences associated with colder weather, namely nasal congestion. During this recording session, Rojas said that McVie was in good spirits because Dennis Wilson had created a rose shaped garden for her birthday. McVie later said of the incident that "he had all these people holding a candle around the edge of it, slowly sinking into the mud. Then he got up on the balcony and proposed to me. Then he sent me the bill for the work. I suppose his heart was in the right place." The producers wanted McVie to deliver the song with maximum emotion, so she recorded her lead vocal five times from start to finish without any cuts or punch-ins.

== Critical reception ==
Contemporary music critics only briefly mentioned "Never Make Me Cry" in reviews for Tusk. Ed Harrison of Billboard thought that the song's "minimal orchestration shows off McVie's vocal range." Writing for the Hartford Courant, Henry McNulty said that the song had "the elegant simplicity that made 'Songbird' such an elegant treat on the Rumours LP." Robert Hilburn of Los Angeles Times thought that several of McVie's compositions, including "Never Make Me Cry", benefited from "ore tailored arrangements." Retrospective reviews have remained mostly positive, with PopMatters identifying the song as one of the album's "emotional centerpieces", although they were critical of the "unpleasant" echo on McVie's voice. Writing for Record Collector, Kris Needs identified "Never Make Me Cry" as a "gorgeous" song that "stood the test of time".

Following McVie's death in 2022, several publications have listed "Never Make Me Cry" as one of McVie's best songs. Lindsay Zoladz of The New York Times labeled the song as an "underappreciated gem buried on the C side of Tusk that "places McVie's angelic voice front and center." Gwen Ihnat of Entertainment Weekly called the song a "beautiful, near-a cappella McVie showcase that underlines her eternal, emotional strength." Rob Sheffield of Rolling Stone called the piano demo of "Never Make Me Cry" "one of her mightiest heartbreakers." He further noted the contrast between the delivery of the "defiant and victorious" first chorus and the end of the song, where her "refusal to cry" is the "saddest part" of the song.

== Personnel ==
- Christine McVie – vocals
- Mick Fleetwood – cymbals
- John McVie – bass guitar
- Lindsey Buckingham – guitars
