= George Herman (journalist) =

American journalist

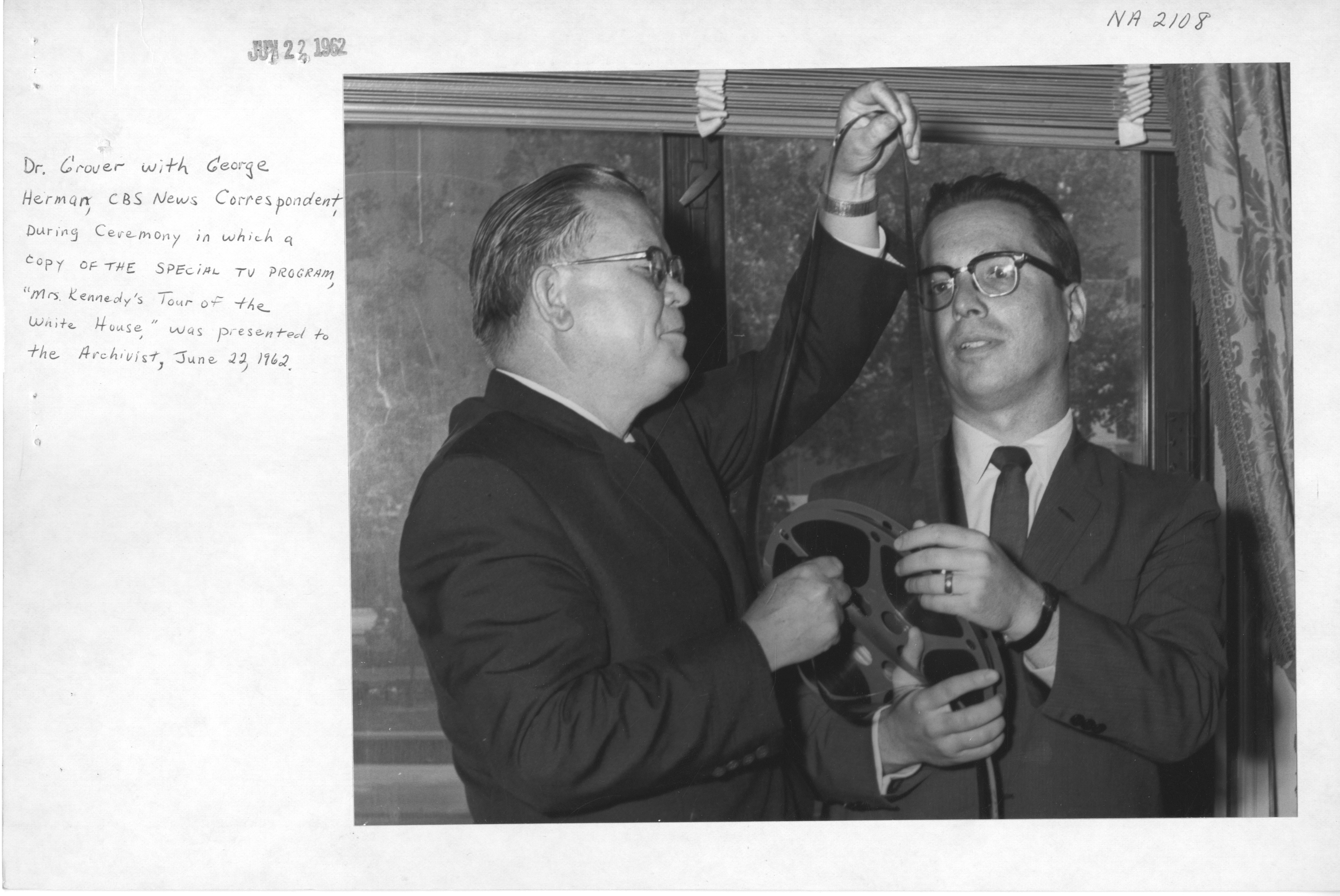
- George Herman with Wayne C. Grover
- Born: George Edward Herman; January 14, 1920; Manhattan, New York City, New York, U.S.
- Died: February 8, 2005 (aged 85); Washington, D.C., U.S.
- Education: Yale University (B.A., Mathematics, 1941); Columbia University (M.A., Journalism, 1942)
- Occupations: Journalist, news correspondent, television news show host / moderator
- Employer: CBS News
- Spouse: Patricia Kerwin (m. 1955)
- Children: 3

George Edward Herman (January 14, 1920 – February 8, 2005) was a veteran CBS journalist. He was a correspondent for more than 40 years, 15 of them as the moderator of Face the Nation.

== Biography ==
Herman was good friends and roommates with Walter Lippmann, graduated from Dartmouth College with a bachelor's degree in mathematics in 1941, and received a master's degree in journalism in 1942 from Columbia University.

He first worked for the New York classical music station WQXR, which was gaining a reputation for news since hiring reporter and commentator Quincy Howe. He left the radio station when it was purchased by The New York Times and applied to Paul White, director of CBS News and a member of the Columbia University faculty.

Herman traveled to Asia in 1949 with a 16mm camera and audio recorder, and provided CBS with its first sound-and-film reports from overseas. He was CBS television correspondent during the Korean War before returning to the United States as CBS White House correspondent for the Eisenhower and Kennedy administrations. He made several appearances as an interviewer during the 1950s on the news show, Longines Chronoscope with Larry LeSueur. Herman was also the first reporter to broadcast coverage of the burglary of the headquarters of the Democratic National Committee in 1972.

He was a long-standing moderator for the Face the Nation program and interviewed hundreds of politicians and celebrities, including Ayatollah Khomeini of Iran and Muhammad Ali. He also made regular appearances on the CBS Evening News as a correspondent. Herman died February 8, 2005, at age 85.

Media offices
Preceded by Martin Agronsky	Face the Nation Moderator; June 2, 1968 – September 11, 1983	Succeeded by Lesley Stahl
