= Martin Agronsky =

American journalist and television host (1915–1999)

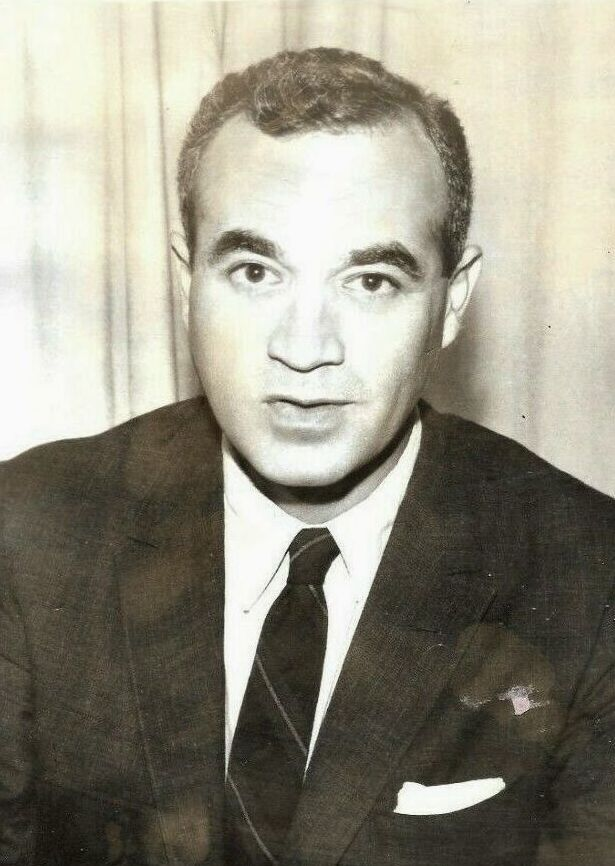
- Agronsky in 1957
- Born: Martin Zama Agrons; January 12, 1915; Philadelphia, Pennsylvania, U.S.
- Died: July 25, 1999 (aged 84); Washington, D.C.
- Education: Rutgers University
- Occupations: Journalist; war correspondent; broadcast journalist
- Years active: 1936–1988
- Spouses: Helen Smathers (m. 1943; died 1969); Sharon Hines (m. 1971; div. 1986)
- Children: 5
- Relatives: Agron family
- Awards: See list

Signature
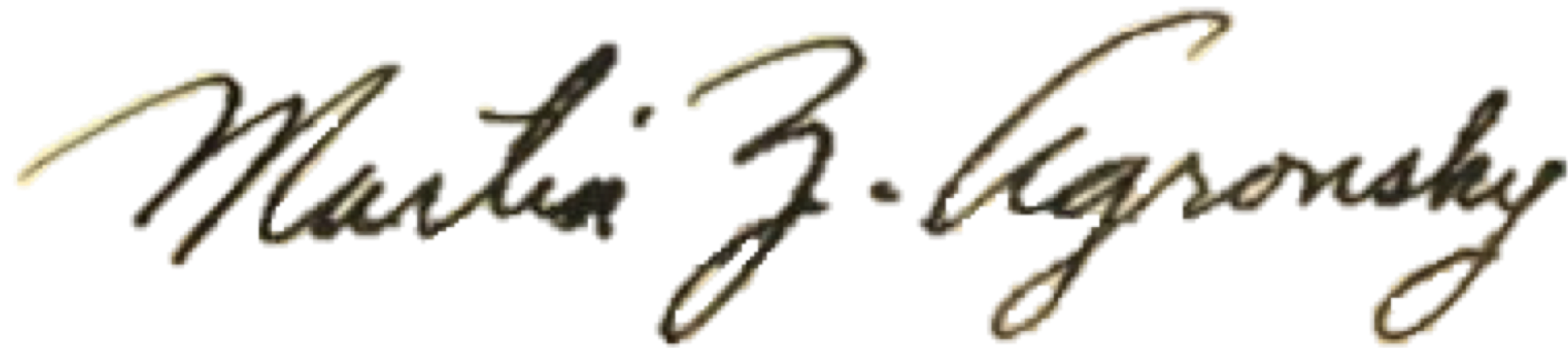

Martin Zama Agronsky (/əˈɡrɒn.skɪ/ ə-GRON-skih; (Note: IPA and respelling per Peabody Awards introduction. During Agronsky's life, there was debate on how his name should be pronounced. A 1954 Who's Who provides in partial IPA that it should be /ɑː.ɡrɒnˈski/ ah-gron-SKEE.) January 12, 1915 – July 25, 1999), also known as Martin Agronski, was an American journalist, political analyst, and television host. He began his career in 1936, working under his uncle, Gershon Agron, at the Palestine Post in Jerusalem, before deciding to work freelance in Europe a year later. At the outbreak of World War II, he became a war correspondent for NBC, working across three continents before returning to the United States in 1943 and covering the last few years of the war from Washington, D.C., with ABC.

After the war, Agronsky covered McCarthyism for ABC; fearless against McCarthy, he won a Peabody Award for 1952. When broadcast journalism moved away from radio, Agronsky returned to NBC, covering the news as well as interviewing prominent figures, including Martin Luther King Jr. as a young man. He returned to Jerusalem for a time and won the Alfred I. duPont Award in 1961 for his coverage of the Eichmann trial there. At the end of 1962, he recorded a documentary aboard the submarine USS George Washington which received an award at the Venice Film Festival. A prominent news reporter, and associate of John F. Kennedy, he extensively covered the 1963 assassination of Kennedy. The following year, he joined CBS, reportedly becoming the only journalist to work for all three commercial networks. With CBS, he moderated Face the Nation and won an Emmy for his interviews with Hugo Black, which marked the first television interview with a sitting Supreme Court Justice.

He left major companies in 1968, joining a local network to helm his own show, Agronsky & Co. A success, the show pioneered the "talking heads" news format. He added the Evening Edition, an interview format, to his show, which became prominent for its coverage of the Watergate scandal. Agronsky then joined PBS, swapping the Evening Edition for a longer interview show, Agronsky at Large. In his later career, he also acted as variations on himself in film and television. A graduate of Rutgers University, this institution would also award Agronsky an honorary Master of Arts and the Rutgers University Award (its highest honor), as well as inducting him into its Hall of Distinguished Alumni. He continued hosting Agronsky & Co. until 1988, when he retired from his over 50-year journalism career.

== Early years ==
Martin Zama Agronsky was born Martin Zama Agrons in Philadelphia, Pennsylvania, on January 12, 1915, to Isador and Marcia (née Dvorin), Russian Jewish immigrants from Minsk in present-day Belarus. Isador Agrons changed the family name from Agronsky to Agrons some time before Martin's birth, but Martin chose to use the original name when he began his journalism career. Members of the family variously used the names Agronsky, Agrons, and Agron. In his career, Agronsky had a friendship with Harry Golden, who befriended and became a confidant to Isador.

Agronsky's family moved to Atlantic City, New Jersey, when he was a young child, and he graduated from Atlantic City High School in 1932. He studied at Rutgers University in New Brunswick, New Jersey, graduating in 1936. At Rutgers, Agronsky (still Agrons) was a member of Jewish fraternity Sigma Alpha Mu and represented them on the Interfraternity Council.

== Career ==
=== 1936–1945: Early career and World War II ===
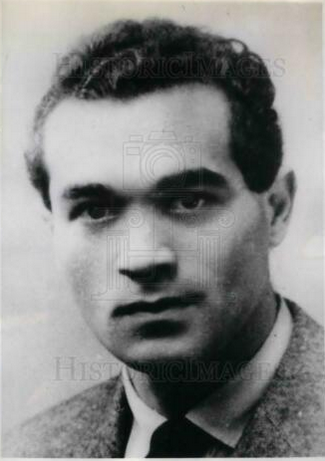
Agronsky in 1942

In 1936, upon his graduation, Agronsky was offered a job as a reporter for the English-language Palestine Post, precursor to today's Jerusalem Post, which was owned by his uncle, Gershon Agron, and moved to Jerusalem. He left the newspaper in 1937 – he was uncomfortable working for Agron, calling it "pure nepotism", as he "wanted to make it on his own" – and moved to Paris to open a bookstore, before becoming a freelance journalist covering the Spanish Civil War. During his time in Europe, primarily Britain and France, he freelanced for various newspapers and translated French stories into English for the International News Service; he notably wrote an in-depth piece for Foreign Affairs magazine on the rise of anti-Semitism in Mussolini's Italy. This article caught the attention of the Paris bureau of the New York Times, the newspaper at which Agronsky had long aspired to work.

At the outbreak of World War II, he moved to Geneva in Switzerland, where he met Max Jordan, the National Broadcasting Company (NBC) bureau chief in Europe, who initially asked Agronsky to work freelance writing radio stories. Agronsky sold his stories to both NBC and the New York Times. Despite having no broadcast journalism training, in April 1940 he was hired by NBC as a radio war correspondent when the company expanded their coverage. Agronsky was conflicted in taking the job, as on the same day he had been offered a foreign assignment job by The New York Times, his dream job, but NBC was offering $250 per week plus expenses. Jordan wanted to put together an NBC presence throughout Europe to cover the British conflict with Germany in the Balkans and tapped Agronsky to be the bureau chief there. Joining NBC as their Balkan correspondent, Agronsky became accredited by the British military and Royal Air Force (RAF). He covered the war from all over the Balkans and much of Eastern Europe before opening a permanent NBC bureau in Ankara, the capital of neutral Turkey. Although based in Ankara, Agronsky spent most of his time in Istanbul. He then became a foreign correspondent in Europe and North Africa, transferring to Cairo and being accredited to cover the British Eighth Army, in North Africa. Though NBC's European war coverage was not particularly celebrated, Agronsky "was a bright spot [...] distinguishing himself under fire in the Balkans, North Africa, and the Middle East."

He was also accredited to cover "Malaya and the Dutch East Indies" in Southeast Asia; when NBC's Asia correspondent John Young had to leave Singapore in November 1941 due to lack of British accreditation, Agronsky was sent in his stead, arriving from Ankara on December 22, 1941. After Pearl Harbor and Singapore were bombed by Japan on December 7–8, 1941, Agronsky, now considered a seasoned war correspondent, was sent to the Pacific theater. His Pacific coverage would take him to Australia, where he was set to cover Douglas MacArthur's arrival in Melbourne. In Singapore, Agronsky first stayed at the Raffles Hotel with other journalists, but left the week after Christmas 1941, on the day martial law was declared, to stay outside the city. He was not allowed to send news of the implementation of martial law, due to the short length of his broadcasts, and was subject to the same censorship as the local press; fellow journalist Cecil Brown was ultimately completely censored, and Agronsky was not permitted to telegraph this news for several days. Brown had met Agronsky in Ankara in 1941, and described him then: "He is a jet-haired, zealous correspondent ... who gets almost all his information from the British Embassy. He works very hard ... and he and Burdett are busy cutting each other's throat to achieve what are euphemistically known as 'scoops.'"

Agronsky was still in Singapore as the Japanese arrived, managing to catch the last plane out before the city was captured. He was then attached to MacArthur's troops and primarily covered Japan's conquest and the Allied retreat in Asia, nearly being captured by Japanese soldiers in Kuala Lumpur and riding with the Dutch military on a Lockheed Lodestar for the final leg to Australia. He came to national attention in 1942 due to his reporting in the Pacific, after broadcasting news that the Allies were struggling in Java due to expired munitions and that the RAF had been turned away from Singapore as the Americans were not expecting them, suffering severe Japanese attacks in the confusion. He flew with the RAF on some bombing missions.

NBC was ordered to divest its radio network through the Red and Blue Networks in 1943, and Agronsky's contract was among those assigned to the "Blue" network, which NBC chose to divest. The associated assets became the American Broadcasting Company (ABC); smaller and less-renowned than the already-established networks, ABC did not have a television bureau. Agronsky returned to the United States in 1943 when he joined ABC. While other prominent war journalists found themselves able to take senior positions on television, Agronsky was instead assigned to Washington, D.C., where he did The Daily War Journal until the end of World War II.

=== 1946–1955: ABC and McCarthy coverage ===
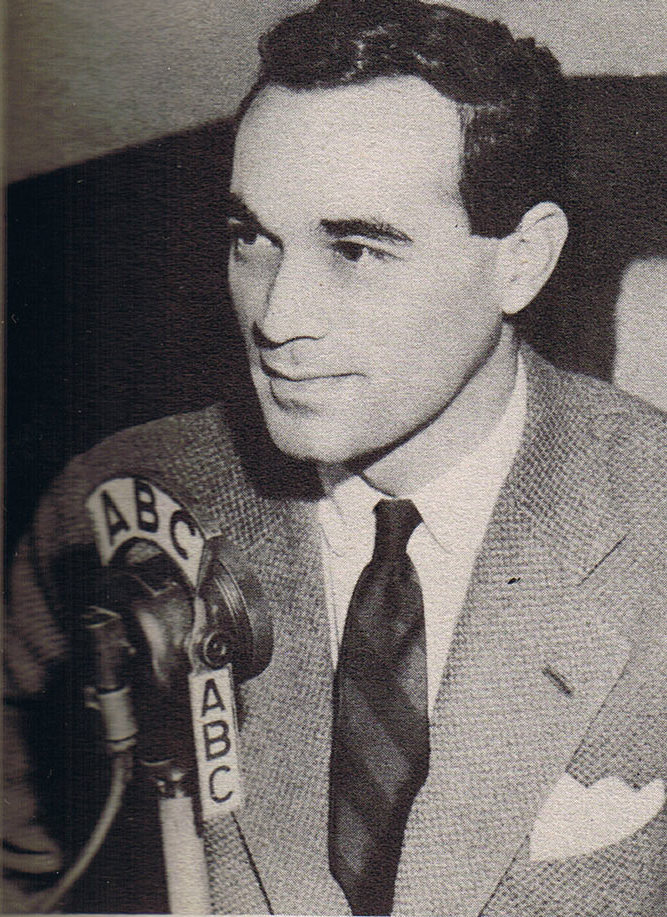
Agronsky in 1946

Agronsky maintained his prominence as a radio journalist for ABC following the war. An early proponent of civil rights, when president Harry S. Truman gave his speech to the NAACP in 1947, Agronsky was sceptical, suggesting that it was "a political gesture"; NAACP president Walter Francis White wrote to Agronsky to disagree, showing the NAACP's support for Truman. In 1948, Agronsky helped to pioneer television coverage of American political conventions, continuing to report from them with the first major television broadcasts in 1952. In 1948, Agronsky had the most sponsors in broadcasting, with 104.

He then took a principled stance against growing McCarthyism, also reporting on the Hollywood 10 and House Un-American Activities Committee. While many reporters gave milquetoast coverage of McCarthyism, said to be out of fear, Agronsky, like CBS's Edward R. Murrow after him, was openly critical of McCarthy and of the senators who enabled him. This bold stance saw Agronsky targeted with anti-Semitic hate mail and his show lose sponsors, apparently pressured to leave by McCarthy so that Agronsky's show would be taken off air; ABC, however, "congratulated him and took him to lunch", and encouraged him to continue with the criticisms. The conversation reportedly went:

Robert Kintner: They suggested I should talk to you [Agronsky] about the way you're reporting McCarthy. Are you going to change?
Agronsky: (flatly) No.
Kintner: That's what I thought you'd say. Keep it up.

Agronsky's 1952 Peabody Award acceptance speech

He won the Peabody Award for 1952 for his coverage and criticism of Senator Joseph McCarthy's excessive accusations, with the awarding committee noting that his ability to get "the story behind the story is distinctive". He summarized McCarthy by saying: "Joe didn't take criticism very well."

In 1953, Agronsky questioned president Dwight D. Eisenhower on investigating communism in churches and on book burning. ABC then became the only major network to broadcast the 1954 Army–McCarthy hearings on television, growing their prominence and "sinking McCarthy" due to the public exposure to his excesses.

Agronsky also did a one-on-one discussion show at ABC, At Issue, which aired on Sunday evenings in 1953. One prominent episode dealt with the tobacco crisis in 1953; new medical reports were appearing that suggested a link between smoking and lung cancer, and the tobacco industry was keen to encourage suppression of this information. One of few shows to cover the reports, Agronsky's program nevertheless "ended on a favorable note after conferences [with Hill & Knowlton]", the public relations firm hired by Big Tobacco. At Issue was moved to Sunday afternoons as part of its block of public affairs programming in 1954, and ended later that year when ABC faced technical and sponsorship issues, scrapping its Sunday afternoon programming. Agronsky was a member of the Radio and Television Correspondents' Association from 1948; and became its chair, ending his term in 1954 (when Richard Harkness took the position) and becoming an ex officio member of its executive committee.

=== 1956–1963: Look Here, Eichmann trial, and NBC News ===
In 1956, with television now the leading broadcast medium, Agronsky left ABC (whose program was still weak) and returned to NBC, as a news correspondent. From 1957 through 1964, starting with the Dave Garroway-hosted Today show, he did all the interviews out of Washington, D.C. In 1960, the show (and so Agronsky) began interviewing executive Secretaries. During this period his reputation grew. (Note: Reports in NBC trade releases 1964: January 7, 1964: "'Today' Scores A Dozen Years Of TV Achievement".; January 8, 1964: "Secretaries Dillon, Rusk, Celebrezze To Be First Guests As 'Today' Starts Fourth Year Of Interviews With Cabinet Members".) He also hosted the one-on-one interview show Look Here, where he interviewed, among others, John F. Kennedy as a senator, and a young Martin Luther King Jr. Agronsky interviewed King on multiple occasions, with King notably outlining his nonviolence beliefs and faith in God on Look Here. Also speaking on God, an answer Kennedy gave to Agronsky on his faith – that he would "uphold the Constitution" above all – became a prolific quote he used throughout his presidential campaign.

Agronsky covered the Eichmann trial, of Nazi war criminal Adolf Eichmann, in Jerusalem in 1961 for nine months from start to finish, for which he won the Alfred I. duPont–Columbia University Award. Agronsky's reports were broadcast daily in a segment of the Huntley-Brinkley Report at 6:30 a.m. as special reports; he interviewed Holocaust survivors as well as figures of interest in Israel and Germany. There was much media attention given to the trial, but typically on the wider implications, with little focus on the case of Eichmann: Agronsky's updates, including a verdict interview on the Today show, were atypical in their regularity. Agronsky called the assignment the "most moving" story of his career. While in Jerusalem, he spoke to friend Richard C. Blum, expressing his stress; Blum said that Agronsky was the go-to reporter in D.C. for Israel affairs. Also in 1961, Agronsky interviewed Freedom Riders in the United States as the group was formed, and covered the Vienna summit.

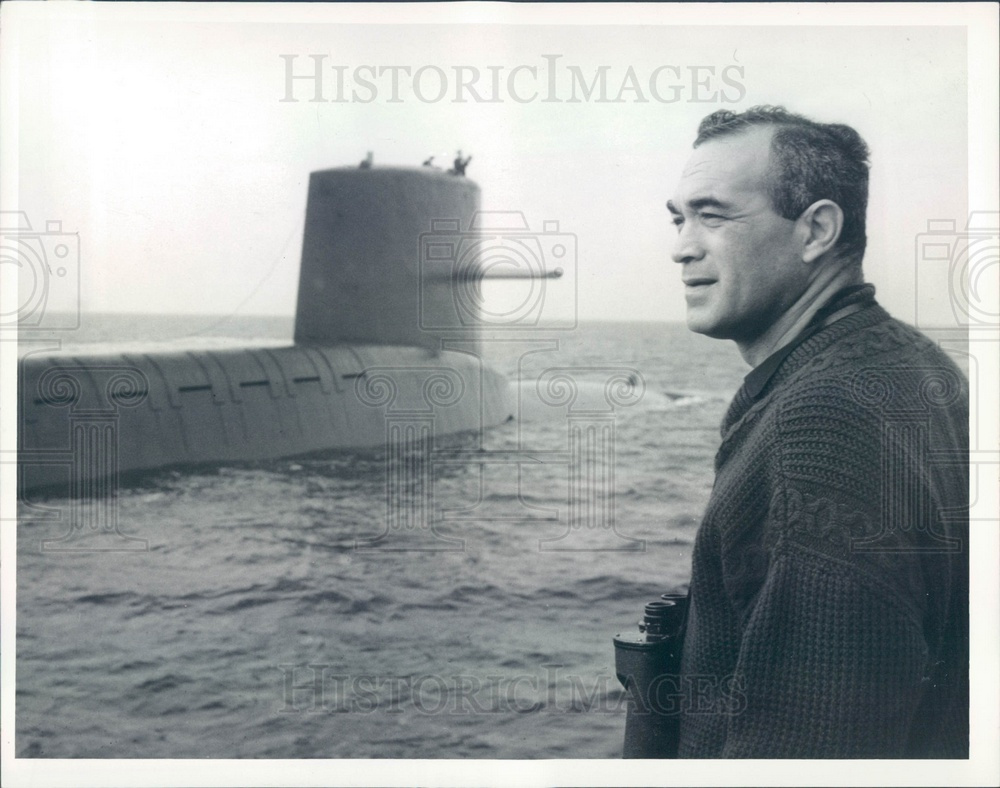
Martin Agronsky with the USS George Washington

In December 1962, Agronsky and a film crew underwent Navy training and joined the submariners of the USS George Washington, part of the American Polaris program, undersea for almost three weeks during operational duty to film the documentary Polaris Submarine: Journal of an Undersea Voyage. It won a variety of awards, including a documentary award, the St Mark's Plaque – First Prize, at the 1963 Venice Film Festival. (Note: August 5, 1963: "NBC News TV Program, "Polaris Submarine," Wins First Prize St. Mark's Plaque At 1963 Venice Film Festival". in NBC trade releases 1963.)

Agronsky began television coverage of the March on Washington in August 1963, at 8:30 a.m. on Today, giving a half-hour report. Coverage then continued in different bursts across networks; Agronsky reported with Nancy Dickerson from the Washington Monument during the day. (Note: Reports in NBC trade releases 1963: August 26, 1963: "Assignments Listed For NBC News' Comprehensive TV And Radio Coverage Of Civil Rights March"; August 26, 1963: "Live Coverage Of Civil Rights March On Washington To Be Fed By NBC-TV (Via Telstar II) To 11 Eurovision Networks"; August 28, 1963: "Comprehensive Reports, Interviews With Headline Personalities, And Multiple Pickup Points Provided NBC News With Thorough Coverage Of The Civil Rights March On Washington"; August 29, 1963: "NBC News' Comprehensive TV Coverage Of March On Washington Spanned 17 Hours, With Excerpts Seen In Europe Via Telstar II") This same month, NBC wrote that Agronsky's "incisive questioning of Cabinet members[,] Congressmen and other Washington [D.C.] officials, as well as visiting statesmen from abroad, often results in important newsbreaks in the next day's papers." (Note: August 28, 1963: "'Today' Reflects The Interesting And Important". in NBC trade releases 1963.) Later in 1963, Agronsky was given special permission to travel to Moscow to report on nuclear discussions, after NBC had been banned. (Note: August 1, 1963: "NBC News Receives Soviet Permission To Send Two Correspondents And Camera Crew To Cover Signing Of Nuclear Test Ban Treaty in Moscow". in NBC trade releases 1963.) Upon his return, he gave audiences his opinions on US foreign policy based on what he had witnessed, saying in such a global political climate, no country could remain a bystander, encouraging the general population to not be apathetic.

=== 1963: Assassination of John F. Kennedy ===
In the four-day aftermath of the assassination of president John F. Kennedy, Agronsky was one of the senior journalists to lead the large television news coverage. The coverage invented the breaking format of modern television news. Sociologists from Columbia University, led by Herbert Gans, interviewed a selection of the on-air journalists covering the assassination shortly afterwards to assess its affects; many were questioned about showing emotion. Agronsky's response, saying a journalist cannot show emotion as it would be imposing feelings on the viewer, was later said to typify the view of the issue at the time. When pressed further on the matter by Gans, Agronsky added: "I wanted to cry, but you don't". He was reported to be smoking as he delivered reports from Washington, D.C., during the coverage, while hiding his cigarettes from the camera.

Agronsky interviewing Governor Connally at his hospital bedside, November 27, 1963
- via Associated Press Archive on YouTube
- https://www.youtube.com/watch?v=bzvGIsu6KGo

Historian William Manchester wrote that shortly after the shooting, Agronsky telephoned Ted Kennedy to ask if he would be flying from D.C. to Dallas, one of limited communications Ted Kennedy received in the aftermath of his brother's assassination due to telephone lines overloading as people tried to call others to talk about the news. Agronsky covered Kennedy's lying in state on the Today show. He noted that he had also covered the funeral of Franklin D. Roosevelt, describing the different mood by explaining that people mourning Kennedy seemed moved by his unfulfilled potential. On November 27, 1963, five days after the assassination, Agronsky conducted an interview with Texas governor John Connally from his bedside in Parkland Memorial Hospital. Connally, to whom Agronsky was a good friend, had been riding in the seat ahead of Kennedy and was wounded. As Connally recovered, the press were desperate to hear his story, but his aides deemed him too weak to face a conference. Instead, the combined press accepted the proposal to use a single reporter as a pool, with all networks carrying the interview live. Connally's office chose Agronsky to be their reporter; he was found in Arlington National Cemetery late the night before and took a midnight flight to Dallas.

Agronsky had interviewed Kennedy in life, with segments re-run on the 20th anniversary of the assassination in television documentary Thank You, Mr. President, and co-authored and edited the 1961 book Let Us Begin: The First 100 Days of the Kennedy Administration.

=== 1964–1969: CBS ===
Agronsky moved to CBS in 1964. While there he held positions as the CBS bureau chief in Paris and moderator of Face the Nation. In 1969 he won an Emmy Award for his CBS News Special Reports television documentary Justice Black and the Bill of Rights or Justice Black and the Constitution, the first television interview with Supreme Court Justice Hugo Black, about Black's views on incorporation of the Bill of Rights. This was rebroadcast in 1971 following Black's retirement and death eight days later.

From 1968 to 1969, Agronsky was the Paris bureau chief for CBS.

=== 1969–1988: Eponymous programs ===
==== Agronsky & Company ====
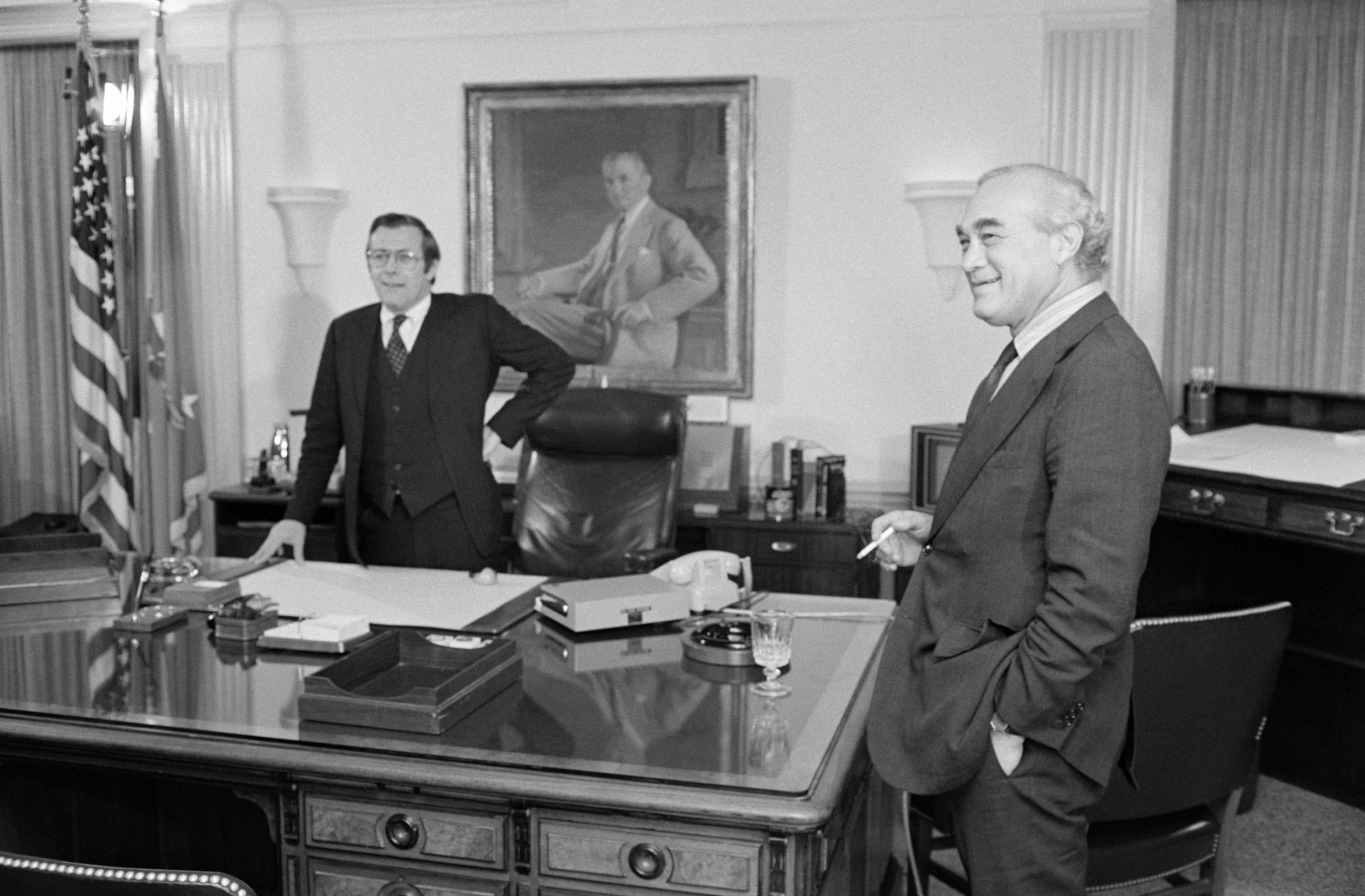
Agronsky (right) with United States Secretary of Defense Donald Rumsfeld at Rumsfeld's office in The Pentagon, November 3, 1976

Agronsky became a news anchor for WTOP-TV in Washington, D.C., in 1969, and in 1970 became host of the political discussion television program Agronsky & Company, produced by the same station. The format had Agronsky introduce a short segment on the news with political reporters. Shortly afterward, Agronsky left the local evening news and Agronsky & Company became a stand-alone weekly show produced and syndicated by Post-Newsweek stations (WTOP's then-owner). The show was syndicated nationally by Post-Newsweek to local stations and the Public Broadcasting Service (PBS) nationally, including WETA in D.C. It was syndicated, in 1981, to twenty-five television stations, and Mutual Broadcasting System began carrying a radio format of the show in October 1981.

In the 1970s and 80s, Agronsky also moderated a radio show, European Perspectives, tackling international news with foreign correspondents based in Washington on the panel.

Broadcasting magazine noted in 1981 that Agronsky "still finds himself in the center of most of the biggest stories of the day." He hosted Agronsky & Company until he retired in January 1988, and it proved to be one of the biggest successes of his career. It was renamed Inside Washington upon Agronsky's retirement, and was hosted by Gordon Peterson until it ended in 2013.

The show generally is credited as having invented the preeminent roundtable ("Talking Heads") discussion format for public affairs and political television shows that feature prominent journalists discussing current events and offering their opinions about them. Agronsky & Company did not have the spirited arguments and shouting that came to characterize many of its imitators, however. Its regular panelists included Hugh Sidey of Time magazine, Peter Lisagor of the Chicago Daily News, and columnists Carl Rowan, James J. Kilpatrick, Elizabeth Drew, and George Will. Although some of the liberal-versus-conservative argumentation now common on American public affairs shows began with pointed arguments between Agronsky & Company panelists, Agronsky himself always exerted a calming influence. The show was held in generally high regard; Ted Kennedy once said that "everybody who is in public life watches Agronsky." In a celebrated essay for The New Republic, liberal pundit Michael Kinsley lampooned the program as "Jerkofsky and Company."

It had been at the forefront of the changing face of journalism in format and in terms of personalities, particularly the rise of "buckraking", with its panelists becoming national figures and often sought after as public speakers in later years. In 1986, it was overtaken in ratings by John McLaughlin's copycat show The McLaughlin Group; the major difference was said to be that "the pace of McLaughlin and its air of personal enmity give viewers the sense that they are watching genuine insider banter."

After Agronsky's death, Agronsky & Co. commentator Hugh Sidey told the American Journalism Review of the show:

I think the first thing is, it was first of its particular nature... So it had its own flavor... And Martin was its patriarch... He was a true shoe-leather reporter... I can remember many a program when we came straight from reporting the story... We came right out of the trenches. I'm not saying that doesn't happen now... but not with the same frequency... I would often come from being with the president... Show business had really not invaded our world back then... The idea was not to shout down anybody... I think another reason for its success was the nature of the times... We had real, real problems, explosive problems, security problems--and the discussions, I think, reflected that gravity... Compared to today... the kind of melding here between entertainment and journalism... The nature of those times was quite different, and I think that helped out the program a great deal as well as the people on it.

==== Martin Agronsky's Evening Edition ====
In 1970, in addition to hosting Agronsky & Company once a week, Agronsky started a five-night-a-week half-hour interview show, Martin Agronsky's Evening Edition, produced by Eastern Educational Network. An early daily news program, it became much-viewed during the Watergate scandal. Richard Nixon reportedly watched the show avidly, sending Agronsky notes on his coverage. Evening Edition extensively covered Nixon's presidency, including the Cold War détente and Vietnam War. Evening Edition aired nightly and was on before, during and after the Watergate break-in hearings broadcast on PBS that led, ultimately, to Nixon's resignation on August 9, 1974. After airing mainly exclusively on Eastern Educational Network stations, the program went nationwide in mid 1975 on PBS. National Public Affairs Center for Television (later folded into WETA-TV in early 1976) took over production from Eastern Educational Network and begin using the same graphics and music as another WETA production Washington Week in Review. Evening Edition ended its run in mid 1976. Due to PBS experiencing "escalating program costs", it cut many shows going into 1976, including Evening Edition.

Though Agronsky had been on coast-to-coast stations for many years, the relatively local programming which he headlined "did much to make Agronsky an influential national figure."

==== Agronsky At Large ====
For PBS, Agronsky and Paul Duke interviewed president Gerald Ford in 1975. Agronsky then did a one-hour interview show weekly on PBS during 1976 titled Agronsky at Large, where he interviewed such guests as Alfred Hitchcock and Anwar Sadat shortly before the Egyptian leader's assassination. He also interviewed Muhammad Ali and George F. Kennan, a recording of which is held in the American Archive of Public Broadcasting's Peabody Awards collection.

Interviewing Jody Powell, president Jimmy Carter's press secretary, in 1977, Agronsky suggested that the "honeymoon" period between the media and new presidents had been effectively curtailed following the Vietnam War and Watergate.

== Impact and legacy ==
During his 52-year journalism career (print from 1936 to 1940 and radio and television from 1940 to 1988) Agronsky worked for all three commercial networks in the United States. He is believed to be the only broadcast journalist/commentator to have worked for all three, and is the only person to work for all three and PBS. He was the first television reporter to interview a sitting Supreme Court Justice.

The moderator-led panel discussion format of news shows was, in 1984, described as "Martin Agronski style". Agronsky & Company pioneered the "talking heads" news format.

His papers, containing approximately 30,000 items, are held in a collection in the Library of Congress.

== Personal life ==
Profiling him for his Peabody win, Newsweek noted that Agronsky was a figure, being 5' 11" and dark-haired. He married Helen Smathers on September 1, 1943. Smathers was a United States Army nurse whom he met in 1942 while covering MacArthur in Melbourne. Agronsky returned to the U.S. in March 1943, whereupon he expedited Smathers's return. They were married in Baltimore, Maryland, at City Hall, grabbing a stranger off the street to be their witness. They went on to have four children: Marcia, Jonathan, David, and Julie. He built a modernist house for his family in Washington, D.C. in 1951, though grew sick of the style by 1953. In 1964, his home set on fire, suffering $35,000 worth of damage, and he broke his heel jumping from the second floor porch to get out. Helen died on February 18, 1969, of cancer. Agronsky then married Sharon Hines on April 22, 1971; the marriage produced one child, Rachel. The American National Biography says that Agronsky and Hines divorced after fifteen years. He died at his Rock Creek Park home in Washington, D.C., on July 25, 1999, of congestive heart failure. He was 84.

Agronsky's son Jonathan Ian Zama Agronsky is an American journalist and biographer. He attended St. Albans School in Washington, D.C., before studying English at Dartmouth College; enrolling in 1964, he failed his studies twice before graduating with an AB in 1971. He used his studentship to avoid the draft for the Vietnam War, something about which he has expressed embarrassment, despite disagreeing with the war. He began professionally writing in 1967. Though he followed his father's career, he had planned to be a college football player, joining a team at the age of eight and playing varsity halfback at prep school before joining and, ten days later, quitting the team at Dartmouth due to injury and discontentment. Some of his earlier columns include contributing to the Penthouse Vietnam Veterans Advisor column in the 1970s and 1980s; he also wrote an article on Marion Barry in the magazine in 1991, a topic on which he was an expert, publishing a book on Barry the same year. At this time he worked for Voice of America in Washington, D.C. He also wrote for the Washington City Paper. As well as journalistic writing, he has written books and scripts for film and radio. His book on Barry, The Politics of Race, was said by Kirkus Reviews to give "a careful, sober, and balanced account of Barry's decline and fall, and of a manipulation of the politics of race", but to "not explore the profound political cleavages evident in the result of Barry's trial". He has written on other legal matters, including in 1987 on Miranda rights in ABA Journal. In 2009 he was included in The Nine Lives of Marion Barry, a documentary film about the controversial politician. In 2020, he began writing a book on David Whiting.

== Filmography ==
Year	Title	Role	Notes	Refs.
1953–1954	At Issue	–	Host; television	
1957–1958	Look Here	–	Host; television	
1961	It's Child's Play			
1961	Nazareth to Bethlehem travelog	–		
1962	Polaris Submarine: Journal of an Undersea Voyage	–	Narrator; television documentary First aired in 1962 in the US and 1963 in the UK (on BBC Television)	
1960–1964	Today	–	Reporter; television	
1964	Cuba: The Missile Crisis	–	Correspondent; NBC White Paper television special	(Note: January 28, 1964: "'NBC White Paper' On 'Cuba: The Missile Crisis' Relates The Momentous Events Of 15-Day 1962 Period". in NBC trade releases 1964.)
1964	After Ten Years: The Court and the Schools	–	Correspondent; CBS News television special	
1962–1968	The Huntley–Brinkley Report	–	Reporter; television	
1964–1968	CBS Reports	–	Reporter; television	
1965–1968	Face the Nation	–	Moderator; television	
1971	Vanished	Reporter	Television mini-series	
1973	What You Don't Know Can Kill You	–	Host; television special on President's Committee on Health Education	
1971–1976	Martin Agronsky's Evening Edition	–	Host; television	
1976	American Workmanship			
1979–1980	And One to Grow On			
1981	First Monday in October	TV Commentator	Film	
1983	The National Financial Planning Quiz			
1983	A Matter of Commitment			
1983	Thank You, Mr. President	–	Archive footage; television	
1969–1987	Agronsky & Co.	–	Host; television	
2018	Hope & Fury: MLK, the Movement and the Media	–	Archive footage; television documentary	

== Awards and honors ==
Year	Association	Category	Work	Result	Refs.
1942	Rutgers University	The Rutgers University Award	Coverage of World War II; described by Rutgers as "the most lucid and penetrating interpretation of world events during this war" (Agronsky was in Australia at the time: the award, the university's highest, was presented to his parents.)	Won	
1948	Newspaper Guild	Heywood Broun Award	Career	Won	
1948	Press Club of Atlantic City	National Headliner Award	Career	Won	
1949	Society of Professional Journalists	Sigma Delta Chi Award	Career; Agronsky was also inducted into the Washington, D.C., chapter's Hall of Fame	Won	
1953	Alfred I. duPont Award	Excellence in broadcast journalism	ABC radio	Special commendation	
1953	Peabody Awards	Outstanding Radio News Coverage	Coverage of the excesses of Senator Joseph McCarthy; ABC radio (1952 awards presented in 1953); the citation read: "In this uneasy period of insecurity and fear, he has consistently and with rare courage given voice to the preservation of basic values in our democratic system."	Won	
1961	Alfred I. duPont Award	Excellence in broadcast journalism	Eichmann trial coverage; NBC	Won	
1962	Press Club of Atlantic City	National Headliner Award	Career	Won	
1962	Overseas Press Club	Best Movie Photography from Abroad	Polaris Submarine: Journal of an Undersea Voyage; NBC (with Scott Berner)	Won	
1963	CINE	Golden Eagle Award	Polaris Submarine: Journal of an Undersea Voyage	Won	
1963	Venice Film Festival	Best Documentary: St. Mark's Plaque – First Prize	Polaris Submarine: Journal of an Undersea Voyage	Won	
1969	Emmy Awards	Outstanding Program Achievement in the Field of News Commentary or Public Affairs	CBS News Special Reports: "Justice Black and the Bill of Rights"	Won	
1973	Peabody Awards	Area of Excellence: Broadcasting	Agronsky and Co.	Submitted	
1974	Peabody Awards	Area of Excellence: Broadcasting	Agronsky and Company	Submitted	
1975	Peabody Awards	Area of Excellence: Broadcasting	Agronsky and Company	Submitted	
1976	Peabody Awards	Area of Excellence: Broadcasting	Agronsky and Company	Submitted	
1976	Peabody Awards	Area of Excellence: Broadcasting	Agronsky at Large: "An Interview with Muhammad Ali" and "An Interview with George Kennan"	Submitted	
1995	Rutgers University	Hall of Distinguished Alumni	Career	Honored	

Honorary degrees
Location	Date	School	Degree
New Jersey	1949	Rutgers University	Master of Arts (MA)
New Hampshire	1977	Southern New Hampshire University	Doctor of Laws (LL.D)

In 1987, Agronsky gave the commencement address at San Diego State University.

== Notes ==
Preceded by Paul Niven	Face the Nation moderator July 11, 1965 – May 26, 1968	Succeeded by George Herman
