= At Issue =

American TV public affairs series (1953–1954)

- Genre: Public affairs
- Directed by: Charles Dubin
- Presented by: Martin Agronsky

Production
- Producer: Betty Forsling
- Running time: 15 minutes

Original release
- Network: ABC
- Release: July 12, 1953 – June 1954

At Issue is an American public affairs television program that was broadcast on ABC in prime time from July 12, 1953, to February 24, 1954, and on Sunday afternoons until June 1954.

== Overview ==
Current issues were the focus of the program as host Martin Agronsky intereviewed public figures. Interviews occurred in "a living-room atmosphere", as Agronsky and his guest chatted while facing each other across a small table. Some guests were experts in the topics being discussed; others were those "around whom publicity has suddenly exploded". Guests and their topics included

- Supreme Court Justice William O. Douglas - Liberty and the law
- Physicist Ralph Lapp - America's vulnerability to atomic attack by Russia
- Author Archibald MacLeish - burning books
- Bishop Garfield Bromley Oxnam - House Un-American Activities Committee's investigation of clergy
- Assistant Secretary of Defense for Research and Development Donald A. Quarles - Feasibility of a cobalt bomb as a weapon

== Production ==
The producer of At Issue was Betty Forsling; the director was Charles Dubin. The show initially was broadcast on Sundays from 9 to 9:15 p.m. Eastern Time. Its "brief summer run" ended in August 1953. In October 1953 it was moved to Wednesdays from 8 to 8:15 p.m. E. T., where it stayed until its prime-time run ended. ABC resumed At Issue on Sunday afternoons beginning on February 28, 1954. That time slot had a problem, however, because it was reserved for individual stations rather than for the network. Individual TV stations that had existing contracts for programs at that time could not carry At Issue. The program was sustaining.

== Critical response ==
A review in The New York Times said that At Issue was essentially an editorial, which "seems to be sincerely interested in having its viewers think." Although each episode offered a conclusion about the topic of the interview, it did not try to convince viewers to accept that conclusion. The review said, "Mr. Agronsky shows skill in keeping his guests in an informative groove", adding that he needed to stay prepared "to challenge any statements that seem to be inspired purely by prejudice or bias." Overall, the review said that the program's "contents have been absorbing and penetrating."

Harry MacArthur, writing in The Evening Star, called At Issue "another excursion into food for thought" and added that it "is downright enriching". In a later article, MacArthur called At Issue "a most provocative and illuminating discussion program".

A review of the premiere episode in the trade publication Variety said that At Issue "shapes up as an important TV entry, both for its subject matter and the guests involved." The review added that the episode "was a little choppy and uneven, but nevertheless intriguing and effective", and it found some flaws in Agronsky's questioning techniques.
