= Tusk (song) =

1979 single by Fleetwood Mac

Single by Fleetwood Mac

from the album Tusk
- B-side: "Never Make Me Cry"
- Released: 21 September 1979
- Recorded: 1978–1979
- Genre: Avant-pop
- Length: 3:29
- Label: Warner Bros.
- Songwriter: Lindsey Buckingham
- Producers: Fleetwood Mac; Richard Dashut; Ken Caillat

Fleetwood Mac singles chronology
"You Make Loving Fun" (1977)	"Tusk" (1979)	"Sara" (1979)

Audio sample
- Short sample of "Tusk" to demonstrate the percussion-driven production and integration of the USC Marching Band within the song: file; help

"Tusk" is a song by British-American rock band Fleetwood Mac from the 1979 double LP of the same name. It was written and sung by Lindsey Buckingham. The song peaked at number eight in the United States for three weeks, reached number six in the United Kingdom (where it was certified silver for sales of over 250,000 copies), number five in Canada, and number three in Australia.

The single was released with two different picture sleeves in many territories: the first featured the black and white picture of producer/engineer Ken Caillat's dog Scooter snapping at a trouser leg, the same as that used for the album cover, whilst the second featured a plain cover with the same font as the album cover but without the dog picture. A limited promotional 12-inch version, featuring mono and stereo versions, was also released to US radio stations.

A slightly different mix of the track appeared on the retrospective four-disc compilation 25 Years – The Chain in 1992.

== History ==
Looking for a title track for the as yet unnamed album, Mick Fleetwood suggested that they take the rehearsal riff that Lindsey Buckingham used for sound-checks, which carried the working title "Stage Riff". Fleetwood recalled that the band played the riff the same way every night with the intention of developing it further in the studio. Early on in the Tusk recording sessions, the band attempted to develop the riff into a full song, but their initial efforts were unsuccessful. They eventually returned to the riff a few months later.

Buckingham brought a new idea for the stage riff into the studio and then worked with Christine McVie to refine the chord progression. Buckingham referred to the title track as being "the centerpiece" of the Tusk album and representative of his mindset in subverting the musical precedent established by Fleetwood Mac's Rumours album, saying that the song "embodies the spirit of rebelling against those expectations in every way possible." Richard Dashut and Ken Caillat, who served as the producers for the Tusk album, worked to turn the title track into a drum-driven production. They took Buckingham's 16-track recording and transferred it to a 24-track tape on a Studer. The drums were then dampened to eliminate unwanted overtones.

Buckingham wanted the drums to have a "hypnotic feel" and said that "we found a 15-second section we liked and made a circular loop of two-inch tape that went across the room. We let it run for ten minutes and put the song over it." They used a microphone stand and another fixture functioning as a spool to wrap the tape around, which was then copied onto a different tape machine. The tape loop originated from a different song with a slower tempo; the band repurposed this loop for "Tusk" by speeding the tape up with a variable speed oscillator (VSO).

In addition to the standard drum kit, Fleetwood Mac also experimented with different found sounds on the song, including a Kleenex box and lamb chops. Fleetwood originally tried to slap the side of his leg for a desired percussive effect, but he instead purchased a leg of lamb from the butcher and hit the food with a spatula. This overdub was ultimately unused for the final recording. Additional noises were recorded for "Tusk", including animal sounds, whips, bottles clinking, and screams. Hernán Rojas, who served as the audio engineer for the sessions, also recorded some Chilean profanities that were included in the song, including the phrase "Puta la cagó".

Buckingham said the decision to name the song "Tusk" was a by-product of the band's impulses and that the title did not carry any particular significance. "Suddenly, Mick was just walking around, saying 'tusk' all the time, and it was a nice sounding word. There's no specific hidden meaning behind it." He added that "there was no sense in telling a literal story about anything. In a way, I almost wanted it to be alienating, in which I think it was."

=== Recording of the USC marching band ===
At the request of Mick Fleetwood, the band recruited the University of Southern California's (USC) Trojan Marching Band to play on the song. The idea of employing the services of a marching band on "Tusk" came to Fleetwood after he was awakened by a local brass band playing outside during a vacation in Barfleur.

I saw the entire village dancing in the streets. They were following the band...I grabbed the remainder of my bottle of Beaujolais from the night before and went down to join in...That joyous, irresistible cacophony is what I heard when I listened to that loop of the riff.

— Mick Fleetwood

Upon Fleetwood's return to Los Angeles, he called the USC offices and received a reply from Tony Fox, who was the assistant director of the USC Trojan Marching Band. Fleetwood then got in contact with the band's director, Arthur C. Bartner, who met with Fleetwood Mac and Fox at Studio D of The Village Recorder, where they composed the marching band arrangements for "Tusk". After Fox and Bartner returned to USC and refined the arrangement, Fleetwood informed them via phone call that the band intended to record the USC Trojan Marching Band at Dodger Stadium. Fleetwood recalled that the band was originally apprehensive about recording at Dodger Stadium due to the predicted costs of renting the venue. He attempted to assuage these concerns by offering to pay for these expenses, although the band ultimately secured the venue for free through Ron Cey, a baseball player for the Los Angeles Dodgers who had previously attended some Fleetwood Mac recording sessions.

A mobile studio was installed in Los Angeles' Dodger Stadium to record the marching band, which included 112 members. Buckingham remembered that the band wanted to record the marching band in an outdoor atmosphere and selected Dodger Stadium for that purpose. The band also believed that the venue would serve as a suitable location to film the outdoor recording session. Some recorded footage of the session made it into the song's music video. John McVie was in Tahiti during the Dodger Stadium recording, but he is represented in the video by a cardboard cutout carried around by Mick Fleetwood and later positioned in the stands with the other band members. The music video also features Stevie Nicks twirling a baton, a skill that she learned in high school. Caillat expected the marching band to be stationary during the recording session, but was informed by Barner that the band played while marching for the purpose of timekeeping, so Caillat used shotgun microphones to record the marching band as they moved.

While the band was mixing "Tusk", Caillat and Dashut used a VSO to align the USC Trojan Marching Band's recording with Fleetwood Mac's "cacophony tape" of sound effects. Fleetwood also overdubbed a reversed cymbal crash to transition out of the drum solo, which was recorded at a different tempo compared to the rest of the song. For the song's intro, which includes someone uttering the phrase "How are the tenors?", the band took an audio clip of around a dozen people talking from the Dodger Stadium recording session and looped it. During a USC football game at the Los Angeles Memorial Coliseum on 4 October 1980, Buckingham, Nicks, and Fleetwood presented the marching band with a platinum disc for their contributions on "Tusk".

== Release and commercial response ==
According to Bob Regehr, who was the erstwhile vice-president of artist development and publicity for Warner Bros, Mick Fleetwood suggested the idea of releasing the title track as the first single from Tusk. Regehr believed that Fleetwood wanted the single to "pique people's interest" and felt that the song would "provoke people". Buckingham instead attributed the decision to Warner Bros and said that the label "felt very strongly" about releasing the title track as the album's first single. He expressed his belief that the song was a departure from some of the band's previous work and believed that the single was effective in eliciting discussion amongst the public.

"Tusk" was released in September 1979, with "Never Make Me Cry" as the B-side. Promotional copies of the single were distributed to radio stations on 14 September. Music Week reported that the retail single would be made available on 21 September, ahead of the album's release by several weeks.

Capitol Records pressed the initial shipment of the single, which was soon recalled by Warner Bros due to a scratch in the B-side that resulted in unwanted surface noise. Warner Bros was informed of the defects from various retail stores across the United States and decided to recall all copies of the single due to the logistical issue of determining which parts of the country were impacted. The promotional copies were undamaged during the pressing process and were thus unaffected by the recall. Subsequent pressings of the retail single were handled by CBS Records, with shipments of the single beginning on the 21st, resulting in a delay in consumer availability.

In the United Kingdom, "Tusk" became Fleetwood Mac's biggest hit since 1973, when a reissue of "Albatross" reached number two. Alan Jones of Record Mirror commented that "Tusk" features "the largest ensemble ever to chart in Britain", with the track containing input from over 100 musicians – the five members of Fleetwood Mac and the USC Trojan Marching Band. In the US, the record continued to be held by the 320-number Mormon Tabernacle Choir with their 1959 hit "The Battle Hymn of the Republic".

== Reception ==
Billboard described "Tusk" as "an eerie combination of vocals and a heavy percussion track." They suggested that it was "not as accessible" as other Fleetwood Mac songs and that it was more difficult to "get a handle" on the hook. Cash Box said it "may mystify some with its droning drum beat, the inclusion of the USC Marching Band and dissonant break" but it has a "mesmerizing quality". Record World called it "a unique departure" for the band and said that "The drum-led rhythm and chant-like vocals merge into a thick tribal dance." Reviewing Tusk for Rolling Stone, Stephen Holden called the song Buckingham's "most intriguing" contribution to the album, deeming it "an aural collage that pits African tribal drums, the USC Trojan Marching Band and some incantatory group vocals against a backdrop of what sounds like thousands of wild dogs barking", and calling it Fleetwood Mac's equivalent to the Beatles' "Revolution 9" (1968).

Retrospectively, Marcello Carlin of Uncut described it as a "collision between Sousa marching band and free jazz/tribal drumming workshop", and wrote that along with Public Image Ltd's "Death Disco", it was "the most avant-garde hit single of 1979." In his piece for Melody Maker's Unknown Pleasures guide, Simon Reynolds called the single a "daft little ditty" that highlighted the "not-right" aura of the parent album, and wrote that its "mock tribal rhythms, peculiar 'found sounds' in the back of the mix that sound like a restive mob, and pompous, punctilious horns" are comparable to Faust's quirkier material, such as "The Sad Skinhead" (1973). He added that it was a "'novelty' hit, and doubtless by dint only of the blind-loyalty of the fans."

Emily St. James of The A.V. Club called it Fleetwood Mac's "weirdest hit" as well as one of their best, describing it as "a work of strange savagery, overlaid with jungle sounds and a thudding, endlessly repetitive drum riff that drives everything that happens in the song." She added: "It's a song at odds with itself, the various voices all tugging at the tune in different directions until everything unites when the vocalists scream the song’s title, an enigmatic moment that means… what, exactly?" Rolling Stone writer Ryan Reed agreed it was "an odd choice for a lead single", describing it as "a nervous, jittery Buckingham sing-along with a mysterious title, an out-of-nowhere drum freakout, and only a handful of lyrics, with the bone-dry tom-toms mixed louder than the whispered vocals. Then there are the interjections of the University of Southern California Trojan Marching Band". Writing for Record Collector, Kris Needs labeled "Tusk" as Buckingham's "most controversial creation" that was "seemingly accompanied by a raised middle finger."

== Live performances ==
For the Tusk Tour, the band used an Oberheim Four Voice synthesizer played by keyboard tech Jeffery Sova to cover the horn parts. An OB-X with a cassette interface was kept backstage if the Four Voice broke down. Christine McVie, who expected to play a percussion part for live renditions of "Tusk", instead opted to play the accordion. "I never planned on learning the accordion...It was just laying around the stage one day. I wasn't sure what I was going to play on 'Tusk'. I thought I might wind up playing some kind of percussion, but I just picked it up and started doing the riff."

Fleetwood's original idea was to recreate the song on tour every night with a local marching band, with one such occurrence happening at the L.A. Forum, where the Trojan Marching Band joined Fleetwood Mac onstage. "It was complete lunacy, with baton twirlers making their way through the audience and these gorgeous horses galloping in full stride". The song was also performed with the Trojan Band during the recording of Fleetwood Mac's 1997 live album, The Dance. The band played the song on additional concert tours, including their 2014–2015 On With the Show Tour.

Since its release, members of Fleetwood Mac have accompanied the USC marching band for live renditions of "Tusk". Buckingham performed the song with the ensemble in April 2015 in the Bovard Auditorium. In November 2025, Fleetwood played "Tusk" with the USC marching band for their halftime show.

== Personnel ==
- Lindsey Buckingham – guitars, percussion, vocals
- Christine McVie – keyboards, backing vocals
- Stevie Nicks – backing vocals
- John McVie – bass guitar
- Mick Fleetwood – drums, percussion

Additional personnel

- USC Trojan Marching Band – percussion, horns, woodwinds

== Charts ==
=== Weekly charts ===
Weekly chart performance for "Tusk"
Chart (1979–1980)	Peak position
Australia (Kent Music Report)	3
Austria (Ö3 Austria Top 40)	6
Belgium (Ultratop 50 Flanders)	26
Canada Top Singles (RPM)	5
Ireland (IRMA)	15
Netherlands (Dutch Top 40)	9
Netherlands (Single Top 100)	10
New Zealand (Recorded Music NZ)	4
UK Singles (Official Charts)	6
US Billboard Hot 100	8
US Cash Box Top 100	8
US Top-40 (Radio & Records)	5
US Record World Singles	8
West Germany (GfK)	7

=== Year-end charts ===
Chart (1979)	Position
Australia (Kent Music Report)	35
Canada Top Singles (RPM)	54
Netherlands (Dutch Top 40)	62
Netherlands (Single Top 100)	97
UK Singles (OCC)	75
US Cash Box Top 100	64
US Top-40 (Radio & Records)	50

Chart (1980)	Position
Australia (Kent Music Report)	97
US Billboard Hot 100	94
West Germany (Official German Charts)	47

== Certifications ==
Region	Certification	Certified units/sales
Australia (ARIA)	Gold	50,000^{^}
New Zealand (RMNZ)	Platinum	30,000^{‡}
United Kingdom (BPI)	Silver	250,000^{^}
^{^} Shipments figures based on certification alone.
