= Fight On =

School fight song

"Fight On" is the fight song of the University of Southern California. It was composed in 1922 by USC dental student, Milo Sweet, with lyrics by Sweet and Glen Grant, for a student spirit competition. The song is played at all USC sports competitions, as well as many other USC related events, by the Spirit of Troy, the USC Marching Band.

During World War II, the song was used to inspire combat-bound troops in the Aleutians Campaign. According to legend, it was played off the deck of a transport carrying American soldiers onto the beach of a Japanese-held island; the troops let out a roar when they heard the song and eventually captured the island.

The term, "Fight On", is also used as a battle cry for USC fans.

Like many other college fight songs, "Fight On" is used by many high schools throughout the United States, though often with modified lyrics.
