= List of Sigma Alpha Mu chapters =

Sigma Alpha Mu is a college fraternity founded at the City College of New York in 1909. Though initially founded as a Jewish organization, the fraternity dropped its religious affiliation and became open to men of all faiths in 1953. In the following list of Sigma Alpha Mu chapters, active chapters are indicated in bold and inactive chapters and institutions are in italics.

Chapter	Charter date and range	Institution	Location	Status	Ref.
Alpha	November 26, 1909– 1983	City College of New York	New York City, New York	Inactive	
**Beta**	September 2, 1911– 1975; 1984	Cornell University	Ithaca, New York	Active	
Gamma	November 4, 1911– 1928; 1947–2015	Columbia University	New York City, New York	Inactive	
Delta (First)	November 25, 1911– 1934	Long Island College Hospital	Brooklyn, New York	Inactive	
Epsilon	January 7, 1912– 1922	Columbia University College of Physicians and Surgeons	Manhattan, New York	Inactive	
Zeta	December 8, 1912– 1915	Cornell University Medical College	Upper East Side, New York City, New York	Inactive	
**Eta**	February 8, 1913– 1991; 1995–2018; 202x ?	Syracuse University	Syracuse, New York	Active	
**Theta**	February 21, 1914– 2001; 2005	University of Pennsylvania	Philadelphia, Pennsylvania	Active	
Iota	November 1, 1915– 1924	University of Kentucky	Syracuse, New York	Inactive	
**Kappa**	December 17, 1915– 1972; 1975	University of Minnesota	Minneapolis, Minnesota	Active	
Lambda	April 2, 1916– 1934	Harvard University	Cambridge, Massachusetts	Inactive	
Nu	April 16, 1916– 1934; 1950–1972; 1982–2001	University of Buffalo	Buffalo, New York	Inactive	
Xi	February 11, 1917– 1973	Massachusetts Institute of Technology	Cambridge, Massachusetts	Inactive	(Note: The chapter disaffiliated from the national fraternity and is now a co-ed Independent Living Group known as Fenway House.)
**Omicron**	February 24, 1917– 1970; 1983–1987; 1993–2013; 202x ?	University of Cincinnati	Cincinnati, Ohio	Active	
Pi	June 2, 1917– 1934	Yale University	New Haven, Connecticut	Inactive	
**Rho**	May 25, 1918– 1991; 1995	University of Illinois at Urbana-Champaign	Champaign, Illinois	Active	
Sigma	April 26, 1919– 1921	Dickinson College	Carlisle, Pennsylvania	Inactive	(Note: Chapter formed from Alpha Lambda Nu, established in 1919.)
**Tau**	May 3, 1919– 1961; 2012	University of Alabama	Tuscaloosa, Alabama	Active	
Upsilon	June 10, 1919– 1929; 1948–1951	University of Utah	Salt Lake City, Utah	Inactive	
Phi	June 21, 1919– 1999; 2002–2012	Washington University in St. Louis	St. Louis, Missouri	Inactive	
Chi	November 15, 1919– 1936; 1956 1956–1986; 1992–2008	McGill University	Montreal, Quebec, Canada	Inactive	(Note: The chapter was ordered to shut down after refusing to pay for the National insurance policy because it failed to comply with Canadian law. It continues to operate as "an independent chapter of Sigma Alpha Mu in Quebec".)
**Psi**	December 6, 1919– 1970; 1987	University of Pittsburgh	Pittsburgh, Pennsylvania	Active	
Omega	February 20, 1920– 1972	University of Toronto	Toronto, Ontario, Canada	Inactive	
Sigma Alpha	May 22, 1920– 1982	University of Oklahoma	Norman, Oklahoma	Inactive	(Note: Chapter formed from the Alpha Club (local), established in 1919.)
Sigma Beta	May 28, 1920– 2013; 201x ?–2018	Ohio State University	Columbus, Ohio	Inactive	
Sigma Gamma	November 14, 1920– 1971; 1976–1980; 1987–2012	Tulane University	New Orleans, Louisiana	Inactive	
**Sigma Delta**	December 17, 1921– 1922; 1928–199x ?; 2003–2021	Rutgers University–New Brunswick	New Brunswick, New Jersey	Colony	(Note: Chapter reformed as a colony in the fall of 2024.)
Sigma Epsilon	December 4, 1922– 1952	Illinois Institute of Technology	Chicago, Illinois	Inactive	(Note: Chapter formed from the Ohr Society (local), established in 1914.)
**Sigma Zeta**	April 19, 1922– 1972; 1977	Indiana University Bloomington	Bloomington, Indiana	Active	
**Sigma Eta**	April 20, 1922– 19xx ?; 1978–1989; 2023	Purdue University	West Lafayette, Indiana	Active	(Note: Chapter formed from Teknoin (local), established in 1912. Re-established in 2023.)
**Sigma Theta**	October 14, 1922	University of Texas at Austin	Austin, Texas	Active	
Sigma Iota	February 10, 1923– 199x ?; 2003–2015	University of Michigan	Ann Arbor, Michigan	Inactive	(Note: The national fraternity permanently disbanded the chapter in 2015 for causing $400,000 in damages to a northern Michigan resort and avoiding personal accountability.)
Sigma Kappa	March 25, 1923– 1994; 1974–2008	Lehigh University	Bethlehem, Pennsylvania	Inactive	(Note: Chapter formed from Zeta Alpha Phi, established in 1921.)
Sigma Lambda	April 15, 1923– 1936	University of Kansas	Lawrence, Kansas	Inactive	
Sigma Nu	May 19, 1926– 1983; 1988–19xx ?	University of Washington	Seattle, Washington	Inactive	
Sigma Xi	May 16, 1926– 19xx ?	University of Manitoba	Winnipeg, Manitoba, Canada	Inactive	
**Sigma Omicron**	December 11, 1926– 19xx ?; 1994–xxxx ?; 2017	University of Nebraska–Lincoln	Lincoln, Nebraska	Active	(Note: Chapter formed from Kimmett (local), established in 1925.)
Sigma Pi	December 11, 1926– 1934; 1937–1970; 1983–1998; 2005–2008; 2016–2019	University of California, Los Angeles	Los Angeles, California	Inactive	(Note: Chapter was formed from Sigma Chi Delta, established in 1926. After going dormant, the chapter was revived in 1937 from 1Alpha Epsilon (local), established in 1934. The national fraternity suspended the chapter in 2008 due to a lack of pledges.)
Sigma Rho	November 24, 1928– 1976; 1980–199x ?	University of Missouri	Columbia, Missouri	Inactive	
Sigma Sigma	April 21, 1929– 1934; 1945–1970; 1979–2023	University of California, Berkeley	Berkeley, California	Inactive	(Note: Chapter formed from Kappa Rho, established in 1927.)
Sigma Tau	February 2, 1930– 1962; 2018–2022	University of Oregon	Eugene, Oregon	Inactive	(Note: Chapter formed from Delta Epsilon, established in 1927.)
Sigma Upsilon	September 13, 1930– 1935	Dartmouth College	Hanover, New Hampshire	Inactive	
Sigma Phi	January 17, 1932– 1987; 199x ?–1997; 200x ?–2008	Bucknell University	Lewisburg, Pennsylvania	Inactive	(Note: Chapter formed from Tau Epsilon Delta, established in 1929.)
**Sigma Chi**	December 16, 1933– 2006; 2018	University of Maryland, College Park	College Park, Maryland	Active	
Sigma Psi	January 10, 1937– 1950	Mississippi State University	Mississippi State, Mississippi	Inactive	(Note: Chapter formed from Sigma Phi Zeta, established in 1933.)
**Sigma Omega**	May 7, 1938– 2007; 2023	North Carolina State University	Raleigh, North Carolina	Active	(Note: Chapter formed from Theta Phi, established in 1929.)
Mu Alpha	April 16, 1939– 1976	Southern Methodist University	Dallas, Texas	Inactive	(Note: Chapter formed from Phi Sigma Rho, established in 1936.)
Mu Beta	March 30, 1941– 1972	University of Alberta	Edmonton, Alberta, Canada	Inactive	(Note: Chapter formed from Zeta Alpha Upsilon, established in 1935.)
Mu Gamma	June 10, 1945– 20xx ?	Case Western Reserve University	Cleveland, Ohio	Inactive	(Note: Chapter formed from Pi Sigma Phi, established in 1921.)
Mu Delta	November 18, 1945– 1974	University of Louisville	Louisville, Kentucky	Inactive	(Note: Chapter formed from Beta Tau Chi, established in 1939.)
Mu Epsilon	June 2, 1946– 1970; 1987–2021	University of Miami	Coral Gables, Florida	Inactive	(Note: Chapter formed from Cleo Phi, established in 1941. After going dormant, it reformed in 1987 from the Patrollers (local), established in 1985.)
Mu Zeta	September 13, 1947– 1950; 2017–2019	Washington State University	Pullman, Washington	Inactive	
**Mu Eta**	October 4, 1947– 2001; 2009	Drexel University	Philadelphia, Pennsylvania	Active	(Note: Chapter formed from Kappa Phi Delta, established in 1921.)
**Mu Theta**	February 29, 1948– 199x ?; 2008	University of Southern California	Los Angeles, California	Active	
Mu Iota	June 4, 1948– 1957	Butler University	Indianapolis, Indiana	Inactive	
Mu Kappa	October 24, 1948– 1971; 1980–xxxx ?	Wayne State University	Detroit, Michigan	Inactive	(Note: Chapter formed from Pi Tau Sigma, established in 1929.)
Mu Lambda	October 29, 1949– 1970; 1983–2019	Pennsylvania State University	State College, Pennsylvania	Inactive	(Note: Chapter formed from Sigma Alpha, established in 1949.)
Mu Mu				Unassigned	
Mu Nu				Unassigned	
Mu Xi	November 10, 1949– 1959	University of British Columbia	Vancouver, British Columbia, Canada	Inactive	
Mu Omicron	December 2, 1949– 1966; 1989–2024	New York University	New York City, New York	Inactive	(Note: Chapter was suspended in the spring of 2024.)
**Mu Pi**	October 24, 1953– 1960; 200x ?–200x ?; March 2020	University of Colorado Boulder	Boulder, Colorado	Active	
Mu Sigma	December 11, 1955– 1973	Queens College, City University of New York	Flushing, Queens, New York City, New York	Inactive	(Note: Chapter formed from Blue Lights House (local).)
Mu Rho	March 30, 1957– 2019	University of Rochester	Rochester, New York	Inactive	
Mu Tau				Unassigned	
Mu Upsilon	May 5, 1957– 1971; 1991–2023	Brooklyn College	New York City, New York	Inactive	(Note: Chapter formed from Chi Beta Nu, established in 1938.)
Mu Phi	May 3, 1958– 196x ?; 19xx ?–1987	Long Island University	Brookville, New York	Inactive	(Note: Chapter formed from Delta Epsilon, established in 1956.)
**Mu Chi**	September 27, 1959– 1998; 2000–2009; 201x ?	Michigan State University	East Lansing, Michigan	Active	(Note: Chapter formed from Alpha Kappa, established in 1954.)
**Mu Psi**	November 1, 1959– 2008; 2011	Miami University	Oxford, Ohio	Active	(Note: Chapter formed from Kappa Phi Omega, established in 1958.)
Mu Omega	April 16, 1961– 1974; 1982–200x ?	University of Toledo	Toledo, Ohio	Inactive	(Note: Chapter formed from Sigma Alpha, established in 1958.)
Beta Alpha	April 29, 1962– 1972	University of Texas at El Paso	El Paso, Texas	Inactive	
Beta Beta	May 27, 1962– 1979	Ferris State University	Big Rapids, Michigan	Inactive	(Note: Chapter formed from Sigma Mu Iota, established in 1958.)
**Beta Gamma**	December 7, 1962– 1965; 1988–1996; 1999–2004; 2007	University of Arizona	Tucson, Arizona	Active	
Beta Delta	April 27, 1963– 19xx ?; 1977–2000	San Jose State University	San Jose, California	Inactive	(Note: Chapter formed from Omega Delta, established in 1961.)
Beta Epsilon	May 23, 1965– 19xx ?;1; 99x ?–200x ?; 2013–2015	University of Massachusetts Amherst	Amherst, Massachusetts	Inactive	
Beta Zeta	October 24, 1965– 1967	St. Mary's University, Texas	San Antonio, Texas	Inactive	(Note: Chapter formed from Sigma Alpha, established in 1963)
Beta Eta	March 20, 1966– 1971; 1984–199x ?	California State University, Northridge	Los Angeles, California	Inactive	(Note: Chapter formed from Sigma Sigma Tau, established in 1964.)
Beta Theta	March 27, 1966– 1972	University of New Orleans	New Orleans, Louisiana	Inactive	
**Beta Iota**	April 3, 1966– 1972; 1983	University of Wisconsin–Madison	Madison, Wisconsin	Active	
Beta Kappa	April 16, 1966– 1971	Hunter College	New York City, New York	Inactive	(Note: Chapter formed from Delta Epsilon, established in 1964.)
Beta Lambda	November 28, 1966– 1970	Lehman College	Bronx, New York	Inactive	(Note: Chapter formed from Manor House (local), established in 1962.)
Beta Mu				Unassigned	
Beta Nu	February 26, 1967– 1971	Portland State University	Portland, Oregon	Inactive	(Note: Chapter formed from Beta Chi, established in 1966.)
Beta Xi	May 6, 1967– 1971; 1989–200x ?	University of Hartford	West Hartford, Connecticut	Inactive	(Note: Chapter formed from Beta Xi, established in 1960.)
Beta Omicron	May 7, 1967– 1971; 1987–1994; 2002–20xx ?	George Washington University	Washington, D.C.	Inactive	
Beta Pi	November 19, 1967– 1973; 1989–1990	Northwestern University	Evanston, Illinois	Inactive	(Note: Chapter formed from the Praetorians (local), established in 1936.)
Beta Rho	May 13, 1967– 1972; 1989–xxxx ?	University of Houston	Houston, Texas	Inactive	(Note: Chapter formed from Theta Gamma, established in 1985.)
Beta Sigma	May 14, 1967– 1987	University of North Texas	Denton, Texas	Inactive	(Note: Chapter formed from Nu Tau Sigma, established in 1965.)
Beta Tau	February 11, 1968– 1978; 1988–199x ?; 2002–20xx ?	Northeastern University	Boston, Massachusetts	Inactive	(Note: Chapters formed from Sigma Phi Beta, established in 1966.)
Beta Upsilon	February 11, 1968– 1971; 1986–xxxx ?; 2008–2013	Boston University	Boston, Massachusetts	Inactive	
Beta Phi	March 3, 1968– 1975	Youngstown State University	Youngstown, Ohio	Inactive	(Note: Chapter formed from the Octagon Club, established in 1966.)
Beta Chi	November 10, 1968– 1971; 1994–xxxx ?	Eastern Michigan University	Ypsilanti, Michigan	Inactive	
**Beta Psi**	December 8, 1968– 2002; 2005	University of Virginia	Charlottesville, Virginia	Active	
**Beta Omega**	February 2, 1969	Kentucky Wesleyan College	Owensboro, Kentucky	Active	(Note: Chapter formed from the Octagon Club, established in 1965.)
Gamma Alpha	April 13, 1969– 1974	Oglethorpe University	Brookhaven, Georgia	Inactive	
Gamma Beta	April 26, 1969– 1977	Monmouth College	Monmouth, Illinois	Inactive	(Note: Chapter formed from Sigma Alpha Beta, established in 1961.)
Gamma Gamma	April 27, 1969– 1977	Stony Brook Southampton	Southampton, New York	Inactive	
Gamma Delta	October 25, 1969– 1975	Northern Michigan University	Marquette, Michigan	Inactive	(Note: Chapter formed from Jewish Org. Youth, established in 1967.)
**Gamma Epsilon**	February 1, 1970	University of Illinois Chicago	Chicago, Illinois	Active	(Note: Chapter formed from Sigma Delta Pi, established in 1965.)
Gamma Zeta	May 9, 1970– 1972; 199x ?–200x ?	Ohio University	Athens, Ohio	Inactive	
Delta (Second)	1970 – 1972	New York University, Heights		Inactive	(Note: Chapter formed from Phi Sigma Delta, established in 1913.)
Gamma Eta	April 24, 1971– 1973	Southern Illinois University Carbondale	Carbondale, Illinois	Inactive	
Gamma Theta	February 24, 1979– 2023	University of California, Davis	Davis, California	Inactive	
Gamma Iota	April 6, 1980– 199x ?; 2014–2018	Towson University	Towson, Maryland	Inactive	
**Gamma Kappa**	January 31, 1982– 1995; 2004	Texas A&M University	College Station, Texas	Active	
Gamma Lambda	February 20, 1982– 2024	Northern Illinois University	DeKalb, Illinois	Inactive	
Gamma Nu	January 23, 1983– 1984; 1989–2009	San Diego State University	San Diego, California	Inactive	
Gamma Xi	February 12, 1984– 1990	California State University, Fullerton	Fullerton, California	Inactive	
Gamma Omicron	April 21, 1985– 200x ?	University of Iowa	Iowa City, Iowa	Inactive	
Gamma Pi	January 25, 1986– 200x ?	State University of New York at Albany	Albany, New York	Inactive	
**Gamma Rho**	February 15, 1986	University of California, San Diego	San Diego, California	Active	
**Gamma Sigma**	April 19, 1986– 2001	Binghamton University	Vestal, New York	Colony	(Note: Chapter reformed as a colony in the fall of 2024.)
**Gamma Tau**	November 9, 1986– 1996; 2005–2007; 2011	University of Florida	Gainesville, Florida	Active	
Gamma Upsilon	November 15, 1986– 199x ?	Stanford University	Stanford, California	Inactive	
**Gamma Phi**	April 25, 1987– 199x ?; 2005	Arizona State University	Tempe, Arizona	Active	
**Gamma Chi**	November 21, 1987– 199x ?; 2010	Brandeis University	Waltham, Massachusetts	Active	
**Gamma Psi**	November 22, 1987– 2001; 2010	Temple University	Philadelphia, Pennsylvania	Active	
Gamma Omega	January 30, 1988– xxxx ?	University of South Florida	Tampa, Florida	Inactive	
Delta Alpha	March 13, 1988– xxxx ?; 2010–2020	Hofstra University	Hempstead, New York	Inactive	
**Delta Beta**	January 28, 1989– 2003; 2010	American University	Washington, D.C.	Active	(Note: After going dormant, the chapter was reformed from Sigma Omega Alpha, established in 2003.)
Delta Gamma	April 7, 1989– 1995	State University of New York at Oneonta	Oneonta, New York	Inactive	(Note: The chapter disaffiliated with the national office in 1995 after university policy no longer allowed recognized fraternities to give bids to first-semester freshmen.)
Delta Delta	April 8, 1989– 2002	Alfred University	Alfred, New York	Inactive	(Note: Chapter was dissolved when the university disallowed Greek letter organizations on campus.)
Delta Epsilon	March 11, 1990– 200x ?	Johns Hopkins University	Baltimore, Maryland	Inactive	
**Delta Zeta**	January 20, 1991	Florida International University	University Park, Florida	Active	(Note: Chapter formed from Alpha Gamma Omega, established in 1982.)
**Delta Eta**	January 19, 1991	University of West Florida	Pensacola, Florida	Active	
Delta Theta	March 2, 1991– 2018	State University of New York at Stony Brook	Stony Brook, New York	Inactive	
Delta Iota	March 24, 1991– 2009	State University of New York College at Brockport	Brockport, New York	Inactive	(Note: Chapter disaffiliated from the national fraternity.)
Delta Kappa	April 4, 1991– 2008	University of Western Ontario	London, Ontario, Canada	Inactive	
Delta Lambda	November 10, 1991– 2009	University of Delaware	Newark, Delaware	Inactive	
Delta Nu	February 16, 1992– 1999	Western Michigan University	Kalamazoo, Michigan	Inactive	
Delta Xi	April 25, 1992– xxxx ?	Ithaca College	Ithaca, New York	Inactive	
Delta Omicron	November 22, 1992– xxxx ?	York College of Pennsylvania	Spring Garden Township, Pennsylvania	Inactive	
**Delta Pi**	January 31, 1993– 2007; 2012	University of Ottawa	Ottawa, Ontario, Canada	Active	
Delta Rho	April 24, 1993– xxxx ?	State University of New York at Oswego	Oswego, New York	Inactive	
Delta Sigma	April 26, 1993– 2010	LIU Post	Brookville, New York	Inactive	
Delta Tau	September 17, 1994– 2012	Florida Atlantic University	Boca Raton, Florida	Inactive	
**Delta Upsilon**	April 29, 1995	University of Nevada, Las Vegas	Las Vegas, Nevada	Active	
Delta Phi	March 24, 1996– 200x ?	Adelphi University	Garden City, New York	Inactive	
Delta Chi	March 24, 1996– 2011	St. John's University	New York City, New York	Inactive	
Delta Psi	March 24, 1996– 200x ?	College of Staten Island	Staten Island, New York	Inactive	
**Delta Omega**	November 2, 1996	Rochester Institute of Technology	Rochester, New York	Active	(Note: Chapter formed from Octagon Club, established in 1996.)
**Epsilon Alpha**	April 27, 1997	Stephen F. Austin State University	Nacogdoches, Texas	Active	
Epsilon Beta	April 26, 1998– 200x ?	Nova Southeastern University	Fort Lauderdale, Florida	Inactive	
**Epsilon Gamma**	January 10, 1999	Illinois State University	Normal, Illinois	Active	
**Epsilon Delta**	January 26, 2002	Johnson & Wales University	Providence, Rhode Island	Active	
**Epsilon Epsilon**	May 4, 2003	State University of New York at Geneseo	Geneseo, New York	Active	
Epsilon Zeta	November 8, 2003– 200x ?	Villanova University	Villanova, Pennsylvania	Inactive	
Epsilon Eta	September 25, 2005– 2020	Louisiana State University	Baton Rouge, Louisiana	Inactive	
Epsilon Theta	October 21, 2006– 202x ?	West Virginia University	Morgantown, West Virginia	Inactive	
Epsilon Iota	March 29, 2008– 2016	Chapman University	Orange, California	Inactive	
Epsilon Kappa	June 2, 2008– 201x ?	University of California, Santa Barbara	Santa Barbara, California	Inactive	
Epsilon Lambda	April 29, 2011– 2020	Buffalo State University	Buffalo, New York	Inactive	
**Epsilon Nu**	April 26, 2014	University of Connecticut	Storrs, Connecticut	Active	
**Epsilon Xi**	April 2, 2016	Emory University	Atlanta, Georgia	Active	
Epsilon Omicron	February 4, 2017– 2020	State University of New York at Purchase	Purchase, New York	Inactive	
**Epsilon Pi**	April 28, 2019	University of Rhode Island	Kingston, Rhode Island	Active	
**Epsilon Rho**	April 30, 2023	Clemson University	Clemson, South Carolina	Active	
**Kappa Xi Kappa**		New Jersey Institute of Technology	Newark, New Jersey	Colony	

== Canadian chapters ==
The national office forced all four Canadian chapters to cease operations or disaffiliate from the fraternity during the period between August 2006 to August 2008. Delta Pi chapter at the University of Ottawa informed the Octagon (national board) that its American insurance provider failed to comply with Canadian law in 2005. They requested permission to secure an alternative and equivalent Canadian provider. Their request was denied in August 2006 and their charter was revoked. Delta Omicron chapter at York University and Delta Kappa chapter at the University of Western Ontario were forced to shut down in 2007 due to impecuniosity, which was a direct consequence of the National insurance issue.

By 2008, the Chi chapter at McGill University was the only surviving Canadian chapter. It demanded that the national office allow Delta Pi chapter's 2005 appeal and establish a Canadian insurance alternative pursuant thereto. It further demanded that the national office act to quash the Octagon's 2006 expulsion order issued against the Delta Pi chapter. The national office offered to consider the former but rejected the latter out of hand. Chi chapter responded by ceasing all financial transfers to Indianapolis. The national office subsequently ordered the Chi chapter to cease operations in August 2008. However, the Chi chapter refused to comply and has continued to operate notwithstanding the order. In 2012, the Delta Pi chapter was reinstated and is once again active at the University of Ottawa.
