= USC Trojan Marching Band =

University of Southern California Trojan Marching Band

- School: University of Southern California
- Location: Los Angeles, California
- Conference: Big Ten Conference
- Director: Jacob Vogel
- Associate Director: Dontay Douglas
- Members: 330
- Fight song: "Fight On"

Uniform
- Website: uscband.usc.edu

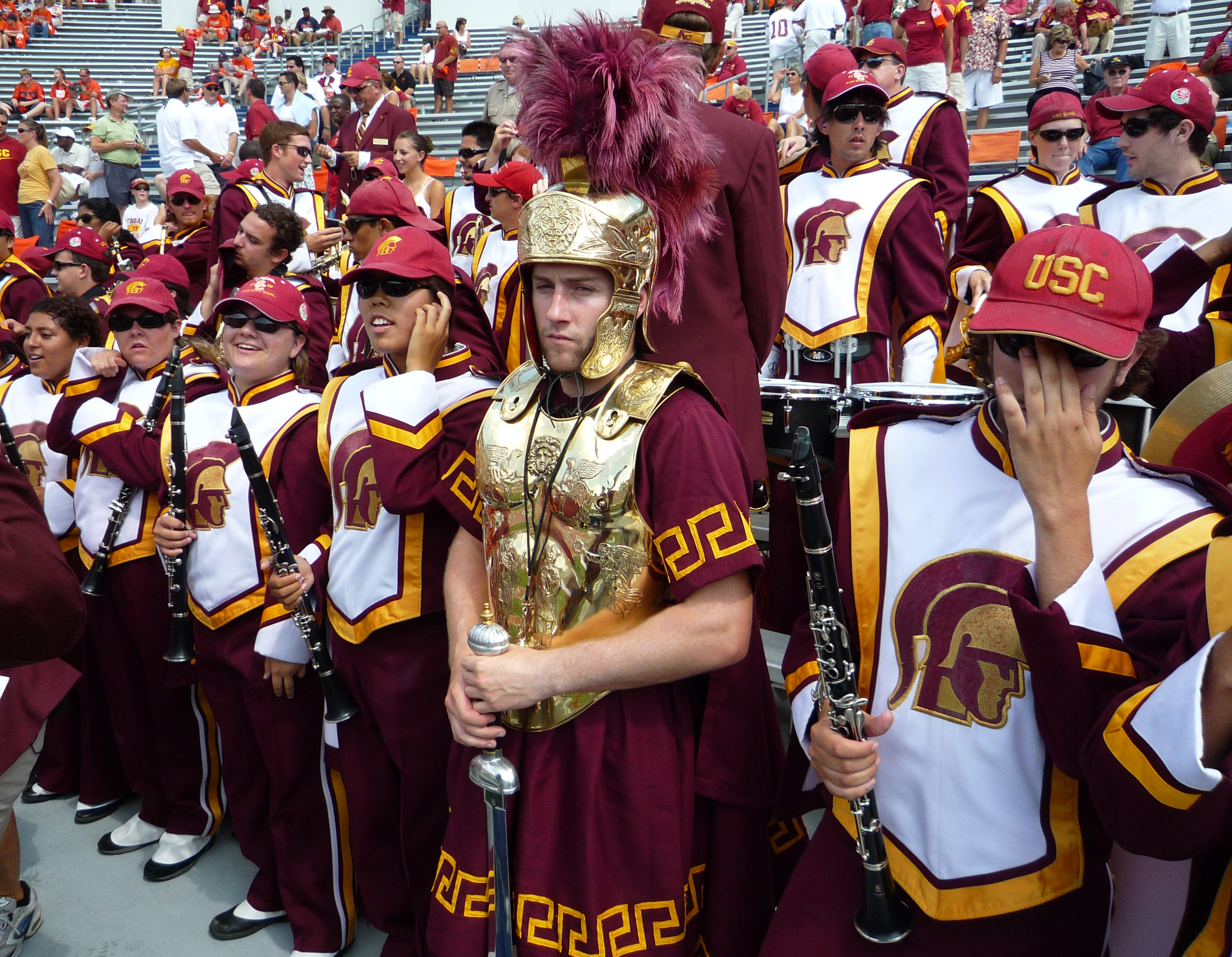
The drum major of the Spirit of Troy wears a more elaborate uniform and conducts the band with a sword.

The Spirit of Troy drum line at Navy Pier in Chicago, October 14, 2005

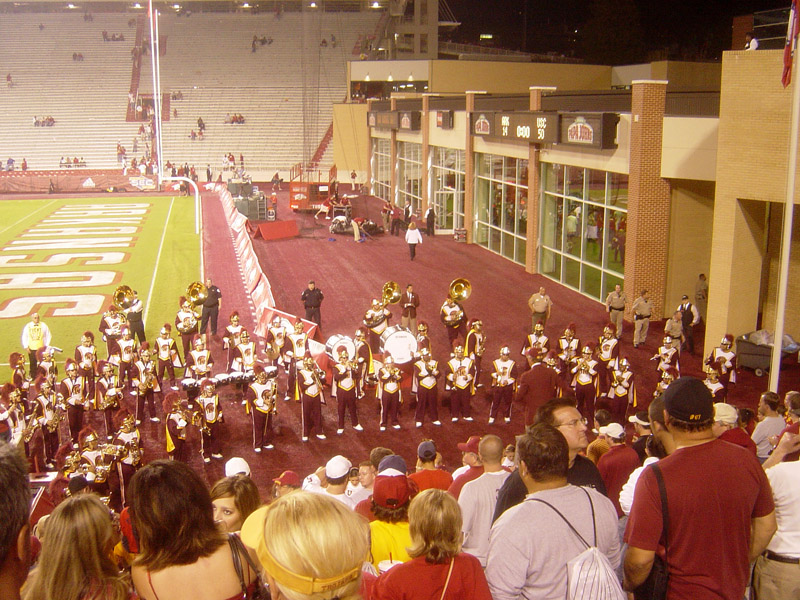
The Spirit of Troy giving a traditional post-game concert, this time celebrating the defeat of the University of Arkansas in Razorback Stadium (2006)

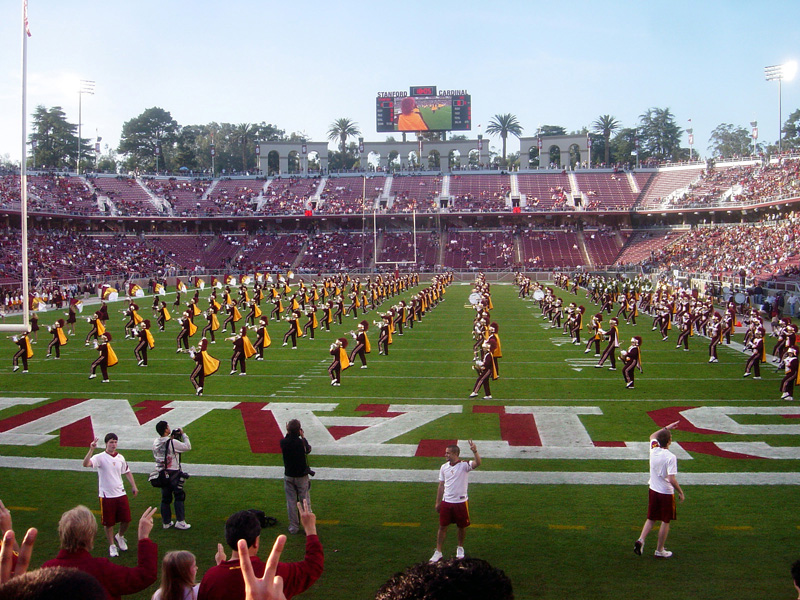
The Spirit of Troy take the field at Stanford Stadium (2006)

The Spirit of Troy's Tunnel Run

The USC Trojan Marching Band, nicknamed The Greatest Marching Band in the History of the Universe (TGMBITHOTU), represents the University of Southern California (USC) at various collegiate sports, broadcast, popular music recording, and national public appearance functions.

The Trojan Marching Band is the only collegiate band to have two platinum records. The group has performed with numerous celebrities including AJR, John Williams, Michael Jackson, Diana Ross, Radiohead, Beyoncé, Doc Severinsen, George Clinton, Fleetwood Mac, The Three Tenors, John Dolmayan, Shavo Odadjian, Odesza, Olivia Rodrigo and The Offspring. In addition, the band has performed for five U.S. presidents, at the Summer Olympics, and on the Academy Awards, Grammy Awards, and the season 7 finale of American Idol.

A contingent of the band has performed at every USC football game, home and away, since 1987. It also makes an international trip at least every other year.

The Trojan Shrine, the symbol of USC and popularly known as "Tommy Trojan", was originally supposed to be named "The Spirit of Troy".

== History ==
The TMB's first recorded performance was in November 1918 when, at the end of World War I, members of the TMB led a victory parade of America's returning servicemen in New York City. "Fight On", the fight song of the university was composed in 1922 and became a part of the TMB tradition. In 1923, the school's alma mater, "All Hail", was composed by a member of the TMB, Al Wesson. The TMB gave its first national radio concert on CBS on April 19, 1929. The band participated in the 1932 Summer Olympics held in Los Angeles, forming the Olympic Braid in the opening ceremonies in the Los Angeles Memorial Coliseum (coincidentally USC's home stadium).

After wearing various uniforms over the years, particularly those with a military style, the band began using basic, unadorned Trojan-style helmets and uniforms in 1950. Three years later, the TMB adopted "Conquest", a song composed by Alfred Newman for the film Captain from Castile as a victory march. The TMB made its first trip outside of California in 1954, traveling to Portland, Oregon to play a USC-Oregon game that the Trojans would win, 24–14. During the Grammy Awards of 1966, TMB trumpet alumnus Herb Alpert won three Grammy Awards, including Record of the Year. Arthur C. Bartner took over the program in 1970, and began shaping the band into its current form. Women were allowed to join the band in 1972.

After several more uniform changes, the TMB began using more elaborate Trojan helmets with brushes, visors, and ear flaps in 1972. In 1973 the TMB began its tradition of sending the full band to games at USC-Notre Dame rivalry games at Notre Dame Stadium.

In 1979, the TMB was invited by Fleetwood Mac to perform and record "Tusk", the title song for the album Tusk. The album went double-platinum and was adopted as a part of the TMB's traditional selections. Additionally, the band later played on another multi-platinum Fleetwood Mac album, The Dance (1997).

During the 1984 Summer Olympics in Los Angeles, Bartner directed an 800-member All American College Marching Band, 125 of whom were members of the TMB. The year 1987 featured several significant moments for the band: the TMB trumpets performed the fanfare for Pope John Paul II in his visit to Los Angeles, the band performed during Super Bowl XXI in Pasadena, and the band began its current streak of attending all USC home and away football games. In 1988, the TMB performed again at Super Bowl XXII in San Diego, and at the Expo '88 World's Fair held in Brisbane, Australia, during that nation's bicentennial

The band took several more international trips in the 1990s, including to the Berlin Wall after its fall, Amsterdam, Brussels, Innsbruck, Japan, the then-EuroDisneyLand in France, the Seville Expo '92, and to France to commemorate the 50th Anniversary of the D-Day Landings. The band also participated in Super Bowl XXIV in New Orleans and the opening ceremony of the 1994 FIFA World Cup. In 1993, USC alumnus and then U.S. Representative Christopher Cox welcomed the band from the floor of the Congress.

In 2003, the TMB performed during the Chinese New Year celebration in Hong Kong, a year later it also played at the Great Wall of China, Xi'an, Shanghai as well as returning to Hong Kong for the Chinese New Year. The TMB participated in Expo 2005 in Nagoya, Japan, while also performing in Tokyo and Kyoto. In 2006 the TMB went to Italy and performed in Venice, Florence and in front of the Colosseum of Rome. In 2010, the band traveled to Shanghai, China, once again to play for United States National Day at the 2010 World Expo and in 2014 for the grand opening of the first Old Navy flagship store in China. In 2016 the band became the first American performing group invited to participate in Macau's Chinese new year parade.

At the end of the 2016 season, the TMB appeared in the 103rd Rose Bowl. This marked the 34th time USC has played in the "Granddaddy of Them All".

In 2014, the Spirit of Troy was declared the best marching band in college football by USA Today's "College Football Fan Index."

The Spirit of Troy also appeared at Expo 2015 in Milan, Italy to perform as part of the American Pavilion's Fourth of July celebration. This was the band's fifth appearance at a World Expo.

In 2019, the Spirit of Troy elected its first female drum major.

Bartner retired from the director role following the 2020 season following a tenure of more than 50 years. Jacob Vogel was named the director of the Trojan Marching Band on December 15, 2020.

In November 2024, the university reorganized the Trojan Marching Band, USC Spirit Leaders, USC Song Leaders (formerly the Song Girls), the Tommy Trojan basketball mascot, and Traveler, USC's live mascot, under the single moniker of the Spirit of Troy. Prior to this, the Spirit of Troy had been used colloquially as the nickname for the band.

In August, 2026, the Trojan Marching Band performed at the 2026 Streamer Games, organized by streamer-youtuber Ludwig Ahgren.

== Ties to the entertainment industry ==
The Spirit of Troy has appeared in several movies and television shows, including:

- Amazon Women on the Moon, in the "Titan Man" segment
- America's Funniest Home Videos, for the $100,000 grand prize in Season 2
- America's Got Talent
- The Croods
- Doogie Howser, M.D., in the episode "Dances With Wanda"
- Fame
- Forrest Gump, as the Alabama Band
- Glee
- Grease 2, as the Rydell High School Band
- Hello, Dolly!
- How I Met Your Mother
- The Cat in the Hat (2026), played the soundtrack rendition of "Shake it Off" by Taylor Swift, composed by Lorne Balfe.
- The Last Boy Scout
- The Gong Show Movie
- The Leeza Gibbons Show
- The Little Rascals
- The Masked Singer Season 8, served as musical accompaniment for Hedgehog's performance in the season premiere.
- The Music Man
- The Naked Gun: From the Files of Police Squad!
- Scrubs, in the episode "My Best Friend's Baby's Baby and My Baby's Baby"
- Sgt. Bilko
- That's Entertainment II
- The Tonight Show with Conan O'Brien
- The Tonight Show Starring Jimmy Fallon
- Two-Minute Warning
- When Billie Beat Bobby
- Win, Lose or Draw, College Week 1988, starring NYU, SMU, UCLA, Georgia Tech, Northwestern & Washington
- You Don't Know Jack, one episode
- The Late Late Show with James Corden, one episode

The band also appeared in the Academy Award shows of 1976 and 2000 as well as at the 2004 Grammy Awards with OutKast. During the 2009 Grammy Awards, it accompanied Radiohead's performance of "15 Step". The band appeared with Beyoncé Knowles and Hugh Jackman on the 81st Academy Awards in 2009. The Spirit of Troy was used for the opening broadcast of ESPN's West Coast SportsCenter from Los Angeles. The television drama House used a section of the Spirit of Troy to play an April Fools' Day prank on its cast during taping. In 2009, the band played on the show Dancing with the Stars. The USC drum line performed with Tommy Lee at the 2009 Guitar Center Drum Off. On April 17, 2010, the band performed "Welcome Home" with Coheed and Cambria at the Coachella Music Festival. In fall 2010, the band was used to film the promo video for the return of the television show Hawaii Five-0. The band returned to Coachella in 2015 performing "Bloom" with electronic music duo Odesza, and in 2024, performing "Tokyo Calling" with the J-Pop group Atarashii Gakko!

The band has played at the Hollywood Bowl's "Tchaikovsky Spectacular" for over 20 years, helping supplement the Los Angeles Philharmonic during the 1812 Overture finale.

== People ==
=== Directors ===
- J. Paul Elliott (1914–?)
- Harold Roberts (1926–1936)
- Clarence Sawhill (1947–1952)
- William A. Schaefer (1952–1958)
- Gary Garner (1958–1963)
- Ronald Broadwell (1963–1970)
- Arthur C. Bartner (1970–2020)
- Jacob Vogel (2021–present)

=== Notable members ===
- Erik Aadahl
- Herb Alpert
- Michael Ausiello
- Charlie Bisharat
- Harry Blackstone, Jr.
- Ken Dye
- Larry Harmon
- Damon Intrabartolo
- Jessy J
- Richard M. Sherman
- Ernie Smith
- Tommy Walker
- Mark Watters

== See also ==
- "Tribute to Troy"
