= Arthur C. Bartner =

American marching band director

- Born: August 30, 1940 (age 86); Maplewood, New Jersey
- Education: University of Michigan
- Occupation: Director of Spirit of Troy
- Years active: 1970 - 2020
- Employer: University of Southern California

Arthur Charles Bartner (born August 30, 1940) is an American musician best known as the director of Spirit of Troy, the marching band for the University of Southern California, a position he held from 1970 to 2020. During this time he has become closely identified with USC Trojans football and has been credited with establishing the Spirit of Troy as "one of the most-famous bands in America." In addition to his longtime work directing the USC marching band, Bartner also served as director of bands at Davison High School in Davison, Michigan, and as director of the band of the 1984 Summer Olympics.

== Early life and education ==
Bartner was born and raised in Maplewood, New Jersey. He claims his interest in music began when his older brother started taking trumpet lessons, a path Bartner followed, and crystallized when he saw the United States Marine Band, which had come to perform at his junior high school. At Columbia High School, Bartner earned all-state honors in both trumpet and basketball, and went on to attend the University of Michigan, where he was a member of Sigma Alpha Mu. After a failed try-out for the basketball team, he joined the University of Michigan Marching Band, where he played trumpet from 1958 to 1962. Following graduation in 1962, Bartner went on to earn a Master of Music degree in 1963 and a Doctor of Education in 1971, both also at Michigan. Bartner has credited longtime Michigan band director William D. Revelli as the most important musical influence in his life.

== Career ==
=== Davison High School ===
Bartner was the band director at Davison High School in Davison, Michigan. During his five years at Davison, Bartner said he doubled the size of the band from 60 to 120 students. During this time he also performed with the Flint Symphony Orchestra in Flint, Michigan.

=== USC ===
Bartner was hired as director of the USC marching band in 1970. When he took over the group, it had 80 members and was derisively known as "the library band." By the late 1970s Bartner had become disappointed in the direction of the group which had become increasingly unruly and insubordinate. Talked out of resigning by university administrators, Bartner adopted a new disciplinarian approach to running the band, banning profanity, hazing and alcohol, and introducing an intensity in rehearsal he borrowed from observing Trojan football practices.

Adopting a disciplinarian approach to running the group, Bartner quickly grew its size and energy. In 1973 Diana Ross became the first in a long line of celebrity performers to appear on-field with the USC band.

In 1979 the Spirit of Troy recorded Tusk with Fleetwood Mac.

In 2011 Bartner was inducted into the USC Athletic Hall of Fame.

Bartner announced on November 22, 2019, that he would step down as full-time director at the end of the season, with the intention of remaining with the band in 2020 to help the band transition to a new director. He officially retired after the 2020 season, with Jacob Vogel named as his successor.

== Personal life ==
Bartner married Barbara Masin, who he met in junior high school, in June 1962; they have two children.
