= Danny Kirwan discography =

This is a discography for Danny Kirwan, one of the lead guitarists in Fleetwood Mac from 1968 to 1972. From 1975 to 1979 he had a brief solo career.

== Discography ==
=== Albums ===
- Second Chapter (DJM 1975)
- Midnight in San Juan (DJM 1976; released in US as Danny Kirwan)
- Hello There Big Boy! (DJM 1979)

=== Singles ===
- "Ram Jam City" / "Hot Summer Day" (DJM 07/1975) – from Second Chapter
- "Misty River" / "Rolling Hills" (DJM 05/1976) – from Midnight in San Juan
- "Second Chapter" / "Skip a Dee Doo" (DJM 08/1976 – US only) – from Second Chapter
- "Hot Summer Day" / "Love Can Always Bring You Happiness" (DJM 06/1977) – from Second Chapter
- "Let It Be" / "I Can Tell" (DJM 08/1977 – US only) – from Midnight in San Juan
- "Only You" / "Caroline" (DJM 03/1979 – UK only) – from Hello There Big Boy!

=== Demo album ===
- Ram Jam City (Mooncrest 2000 – recorded in the mid-1970s as demo tracks for the Second Chapter album)

== Other releases featuring Danny Kirwan ==
- Otis Spann – The Biggest Thing Since Colossus (1969)
- Tramp – Tramp (1969)
- Clifford Davis – "Before the Beginning" / "Man of the World" (Blue Horizon 1969)
- Clifford Davis – "Come On Down and Follow Me" / "Homework" (Blue Horizon 1970)
- Christine Perfect – Christine Perfect (CBS 1970)
- Jeremy Spencer – Jeremy Spencer (Reprise 1970)
- Jeremy Spencer – "Linda" / "Teenage Darling" (Reprise 1970)
- Chris Youlden – Nowhere Road (1973)
- Tramp – Put a Record On (1974)
- Jo Ann Kelly – Tramp 1974 (Mooncrest 2001 – Kirwan plays on 6 tracks recorded live in 1974)

== With Fleetwood Mac ==
=== Albums ===
- Then Play On (Reprise 1969)
- Fleetwood Mac in Chicago/Blues Jam in Chicago, Vols. 1–2 (Blue Horizon 1969)
- Kiln House (Reprise 1970)
- Future Games (Reprise 1971)
- Bare Trees (Reprise 1972)

=== Singles ===
- "Albatross" / "Jigsaw Puzzle Blues" (Blue Horizon 01/1969)
- "Man of the World" / "Somebody's Gonna Get Their Head Kicked In Tonite" (Immediate 04/1969)
- "Oh Well (Part 1)" / "Oh Well (Part 2)" (Reprise 11/1969)
- "Rattlesnake Shake" / "Coming Your Way" (France, Germany, USA, Canada 1969)
- "The Green Manalishi (With the Two-Pronged Crown)" / "World in Harmony" (Reprise 05/1970)
- "Jewel Eyed Judy" / "Station Man" (Germany, Netherlands, USA 1970)
- "Tell Me All the Things You Do" / "This Is the Rock" (France 1970)
- "Dragonfly" / "The Purple Dancer" (Reprise 03/1971)
- "Sands of Time" / "Lay It All Down" (USA 11/1971)
- "Sentimental Lady" / "Sunny Side Of Heaven" (USA 05/1972)

"Somebody's Gonna Get Their Head Kicked in Tonight" was credited to 'Earl Vince and the Valiants', a pseudonym sometimes used by Fleetwood Mac when Jeremy Spencer sang lead.
