= Before the Beginning =

Song by Fleetwood Mac

from the album Then Play On
- Released: 19 September 1969
- Recorded: 18 April 1969
- Studio: De Lane Lea Studios
- Length: 3:28
- Label: Reprise
- Songwriter: Peter Green
- Producer: Fleetwood Mac

"Before the Beginning" is a song by British rock band Fleetwood Mac. It was written by Peter Green and was included as the final track on the band's 1969 studio album Then Play On. Originally written and recorded in January 1969, the band revisited and re-recorded the track later in April. The song has since been covered by a few artists, including Clifford Davis and Trixie Whitley, with Davis' version also being released as a single.

== Background ==
"Before the Beginning" started off as an instrumental titled "Blues in B Flat Minor", which was recorded on 8 January 1969 at a New York City recording studio during the same sessions as "Showbiz Blues", "Man of the World", "Somebody's Gonna Get Their Head Kicked In Tonite", and "Like it This Way". Two takes of "Blues in B Flat Minor" were left incomplete and the third take was later included on The Vaudeville Years. On 25 January 1969, Fleetwood Mac performed a live version of the song at the Shrine Auditorium in Los Angeles. This version was released on Shrine '69 under the title "Before the Beginning", which featured vocals unlike "Blues in B Flat Minor".

Fleetwood Mac revisited "Before the Beginning" at De Lane Lea Studios in London on 18 April 1969. Seven takes were recorded, of which the fifth was selected as the master. Green told Record Mirror that he had reservations with the title "Before the Beginning", saying that "it's called that at the moment, but I don't like that name. It's what it's about – but it sounds pretentious." Nick Logan of New Musical Express noted that the song features a solo from Green midway through the composition; Logan obtained this information through an interview with Green at his home prior to the release of Then Play On. Record Mirror visited the band at a recording session and reported that Green had recorded a "Duane Eddy-like bass part" on the track. In the July 1969 edition of John Mayall's newsletter, Green listed "Before the Beginning" as the first track of side one of Then Play On.

Musically, the song is built upon instrumentation of guitars, bass, and drums, with tom-toms mixed to sound resonant. Earlier mixes of the song featured more muted tom-toms and also lacked a bass part. The lyrics detail a narrator restlessly lying awake ruminating over a deteriorating romance.

== Critical reception ==
Nick Logan of New Musical Express wrote that the song possessed an "atmospheric guitar" and a "voice that cries from the mind." He also felt that the "superlatively beautiful composition" resembled "Man of the World". A different review from New Musical Express referred to "Before the Beginning" as "a beautiful blues ballad with an achingly sad quality to it" and "one of the best Peter Green compositions from his group's Then Play On LP". Blender selected "Before the Beginning" as one of the "standout tracks" on the album. The Rolling Stone Album Guide identified the song as one of the album's "compact cuts" that "pack the tangled guitar lines into clear melodic structures".

Marshall Gu of PopMatters thought that the guitars during the refrain were particularly striking, while Mick Fleetwood's drums sound like they're coming from down the hallway of an abandoned mansion." Jim Campilongo of Guitar Player called it "the perfect ending to an almost-perfect record". Writing for the Lexington Herald-Leader Walter Tunis said that the song's lyrics were "as restless, wispy and forlorn as its superbly crafted guitar melodies, all of which are underscored by a disquieting drum rattle from Mick Fleetwood. It is a spellbinding coda to Fleetwood Mac's most underappreciated triumph."

== Cover versions ==
Clifford Davis, who served as the band's manager and had a career as a professional vocalist, covered "Before the Beginning" in July 1969 with Green. Billboard announced that Davis' version would be released as a commercial single in their 29 September 1969 edition of the publication. The recording received orchestral overdubs and was coupled with a cover of Fleetwood Mac's "Man of the World". It was one of three covers from Fleetwood Mac's Then Play On recorded and released around that time, with the others being "Christine Perfect's rendition of "When You Say" and "Closing My Eyes" by David McIvor, a musical artist who was "discovered by Davis" according to New Musical Express. The publication said that Davis "makes a pretty good stab it", but felt like a deeper vocal timbre would have accentuated "the nuances of the lyrics". Trixie Whitley later covered the song on the 2012 tribute album, Just Tell Me That You Want Me: A Tribute to Fleetwood Mac.
