= The Vaudeville Years =

Compilation album by Fleetwood Mac
- Released: 13 October 1998
- Recorded: 1968–70
- Genre: Blues rock
- Length: 140:20
- Label: Receiver Records

The Vaudeville Years of Fleetwood Mac 1968 to 1970 (or just The Vaudeville Years) is an album by British blues rock band Fleetwood Mac, released in 1998. It was a compilation of outtakes and unreleased tracks from the band's early line-up, none of which had previously been officially released. Available on double vinyl LP and double CD, it came with a booklet of extensive notes and anecdotes (written by Martin Celmins), and was the companion volume to Show-Biz Blues: Fleetwood Mac 1968–70, which was released a few years later.

The release included songs originally intended for the second unreleased disc of Then Play On. These included tracks recorded by Jeremy Spencer. There was also a single live performance of "Oh Well" with the rest of the collection filled out with various alternative takes of familiar Green, Spencer and Kirwan songs, including an alternative take of Peter Green's "The Green Manalishi (With the Two Prong Crown)".

"The Vaudeville Years" was reissued in 2008 as a double CD set with a single DVD, but without the extensive sleeve notes.

== Track listing ==
=== Disc one ===
1. "Intro/Lazy Poker Blues" (Peter Green, Clifford Adams) – 3:48
2. "My Baby's Sweeter" (Willie Dixon) – 3:53
3. "Love that Burns" (Green, Adams) – 4:15
4. "Talk to Me Baby" (Elmore James) – 3:37
5. "Everyday I Have the Blues #1" (John Chatman) – 4:13
6. "Jeremy's Contribution to Doo-Wop" (Jeremy Spencer) – 3:34
7. "Everyday I Have the Blues #2" (Chatman) – 4:23
8. "Death Bells" (Lightnin' Hopkins) – 5:05
9. "(Watch Out for Yourself) Mr Jones" (Spencer) – 3:35
10. "Man of Action" (Spencer) – 5:21
11. "Do You Give a Damn for Me" (Green) – 3:45 ~ early version of "Showbiz Blues"
12. "Man of the World" (Green) – 3:28
13. "Like It This Way" (Danny Kirwan) – 3:17
14. "Blues in B Flat Minor" (Green) – 4:16 ~ instrumental version of "Before the Beginning"
15. "Somebody's Gonna Get Their Head Kicked in Tonite" (Spencer) – 2:58 ~ full-length version
16. "Although the Sun Is Shining" (Kirwan) – 2:24
17. "Showbiz Blues" (Green) – 6:51

=== Disc two ===
1. "Underway" (Green) – 16:15 ~ full-length version
2. "The Madge Sessions #1" (John McVie, Mick Fleetwood) – 17:21
3. "The Madge Sessions #2" (McVie, Fleetwood) – 2:42
4. "(That's What) I Want You to Know" (Spencer) – 3:54
5. "Oh Well" (Green) – 2:47
6. "Love It Seems" (Kirwan) – 2:39
7. "Mighty Cold" (Doc Pomus, Mort Shuman) – 2:28
8. "Fast Talking Woman Blues" (Green) – 4:02 ~ also known as "Drifting"
9. "Tell Me from the Start" (Kirwan) – 2:02
10. "October Jam #1" (Kirwan, Green, McVie) – 5:01
11. "October Jam #2" (Kirwan, Green, McVie, Fleetwood) – 1:57
12. "The Green Manalishi (With the Two Prong Crown)" (Green) – 4:43
13. "World in Harmony" (Kirwan, Green) – 3:28
14. "Farewell" (Kirwan) – 2:18 ~ early demo of "Earl Gray"

== Personnel ==
- Peter Green – guitar, vocals
- Jeremy Spencer – guitar, vocals
- Danny Kirwan – guitar, vocals
- John McVie – bass guitar
- Mick Fleetwood – drums, percussion
