= Live at the BBC (Fleetwood Mac album) =

Live album by Fleetwood Mac
- Released: 1995
- Recorded: 1967–71
- Genre: Blues rock
- Length: 108:30
- Label: Castle Communications

Professional ratings
Review scores
Source	Rating
AllMusic	4/5 stars
The Virgin Encyclopedia of the Blues	4/5 stars

Live at the BBC is a double compact disc compilation album by British blues rock band Fleetwood Mac, recorded at various BBC radio sessions between 1967 and 1971. It contains many tracks by Fleetwood Mac which are otherwise unavailable.

== Background ==
According to Mick Fleetwood, the release was initiated around 1992 by a fan of Fleetwood Mac when they informed him that some BBC tapes of the band were still intact. Fleetwood then contacted the BBC, who insisted that the tapes had actually been destroyed. The BBC was eventually able to supply these recordings to Fleetwood and spent 15 months preparing them for release and clearing the licensing. He expressed his approval for the quality of the tapes and said that they "represented everything this band was when we first started."

When asked about the band's sessions at the BBC, Fleetwood responded by saying that the sessions were conducted in an efficient manner and that the audio engineers were well versed in recording a wide array of music ensembles.

The engineers were of the old school and could record all kinds of bands from rock to big bands. Sometimes there was an audience to play in front of and I can even remember playing live on the radio, so there was no room for error when we were setting up and playing live.

— Mick Fleetwood

== Track listing ==
=== Disc one ===
No.	Title	Writer(s)	First broadcast date	Length
1.	"Rattlesnake Shake"	Peter Green	9 Apr 1970	7:38
2.	"Sandy Mary"	Green	23 May 1970	5:00
3.	"I Believe My Time Ain't Long"	Robert Johnson, arr. Jeremy Spencer	12 Nov 1967	3:00
4.	"Although the Sun Is Shining"	Danny Kirwan	12 Oct 1969	2:31
5.	"Only You"	Kirwan	23 May 1970	2:51
6.	"You Never Know What You're Missing"	Spencer	16 Mar 1969	2:52
7.	"Oh Well, Part 1"	Green	12 Oct 1969	2:26
8.	"Can't Believe You Wanna Leave"	Lloyd Price	16 Mar 1969	3:25
9.	"Jenny Lee"	Spencer	22 Aug 1970	2:19
10.	"Heavenly"	Conway Twitty	16 Mar 1969	2:37
11.	"When Will I Be Loved"	Phil Everly	22 Aug 1970	2:13
12.	"When I See My Baby"	Kirwan	22 Aug 1970	2:11
13.	"Buddy's Song"	Buddy Holly	22 Aug 1970	2:09
14.	"Honey Hush"	Big Joe Turner	22 Aug 1970	3:08
15.	"Preachin'"	Son House	23 Jan 1971	3:05
16.	"Jumping at Shadows"	Duster Bennett	15 Jun 1969	3:35
17.	"Preachin' Blues"	Johnson	11 Sep 1968	1:59
18.	"Need Your Love So Bad"	Little Willie John, Mertis John Jr.	11 Sep 1968	3:48

=== Disc two ===
No.	Title	Writer(s)	First broadcast date	Length
1.	"Long Grey Mare"	Green	12 Nov 1967	2:53
2.	"Sweet Home Chicago"	Johnson	26 Nov 1968	3:10
3.	"Baby Please Set a Date"	Elmore James, Marshall Sehorn (Note: Incorrectly credited on the sleeve to "McCoy".)	12 Nov 1967	2:59
4.	"Blues with a Feeling"	Marion Walter Jacobs	16 Mar 1969	2:56
5.	"Stop Messin' Round"	Green	1 Sep 1968	2:17
6.	"Tallahassee Lassie"	Frank Slay, Frederick Picariello, Bob Crewe	11 May 1969	3:24
7.	"Hang on to a Dream"	Tim Hardin	5 Nov 1968	2:56
8.	"Linda"	Spencer	15 Jun 1969	2:03
9.	"Mean Mistreatin' Mama"	Leroy Carr	2 Jun 1968	4:03
10.	"World Keeps Turning"	Green	21 Jan 1968	2:39
11.	"I Can't Hold Out"	James	21 Jan 1968	2:27
12.	"Early Morning Come"	Kirwan	11 May 1969	2:29
13.	"Albatross"	Green	5 Nov 1968	2:48
14.	"Looking for Somebody"	Green	12 Nov 1967	2:40
15.	"A Fool No More"	Green	12 Nov 1967	3:40
16.	"Got to Move"	James, Sehorn	12 Nov 1967	2:57
17.	"Like Crying Like Dying"	Kirwan	9 Oct 1968	2:33
18.	"Man of the World"	Green	15 Jun 1969	2:49

== Personnel ==
Fleetwood Mac

- Peter Green – guitar, harmonica, vocals
- Jeremy Spencer – guitar, piano, vocals
- Danny Kirwan – guitar, vocals
- John McVie – bass guitar
- Mick Fleetwood – drums, percussion
- Christine McVie (née Perfect) – piano, backing vocals ("Preachin'"); as guest: ("Preachin' Blues", "Need Your Love So Bad", "Stop Messing Around")

Guests

- Neil Picket – fiddle ("Sandy Mary", "Only You")
- Eddie Boyd – piano ("I Can't Hold Out")

== Charts ==
Chart (1995)	Peak position
UK Albums (Official Charts)	48

== Notes ==
Footnotes
