= Shrine '69 =

Live album by Fleetwood Mac
- Released: 1999
- Recorded: 25 January 1969
- Venue: Shrine Auditorium
- Genre: Blues-rock
- Length: 43:13
- Label: Rykodisc

Fleetwood Mac chronology
The Dance (1997)	Shrine '69 (1999)	The Very Best of Fleetwood Mac (2002)

Shrine '69 is a live album by British blues rock band Fleetwood Mac, recorded on 25 January 1969, and finally released in 1999. Recorded at a concert in Los Angeles, this album includes versions of the band's recent hits, "Albatross" and "Need Your Love So Bad", as well as more unusual songs like "Before the Beginning" and "Lemon Squeezer".

== Track listing ==
1. "Tune Up" – 2:10
2. "If You Be My Baby" (Peter Green, C.G. Adams) – 4:28
3. "Something Inside of Me" (Danny Kirwan) – 4:03
4. "My Sweet Baby" (Homesick James) – 4:26
5. "Albatross" (Green) – 3:26
6. "Before the Beginning" (Green) – 3:05
7. "Rollin' Man" (Green, Adams) – 5:33
8. "Lemon Squeezer" (James A. Lane) – 5:29
9. "Need Your Love So Bad" (Little Willie John, Mertis John Jr.) – 6:59
10. "Great Balls of Fire" (Otis Blackwell, Jack Hammer) – 3:37

== Personnel ==
Fleetwood Mac

- Peter Green – guitar, vocals
- Jeremy Spencer – slide guitar, vocals, piano
- Danny Kirwan – guitar, vocals
- John McVie – bass guitar
- Mick Fleetwood – drums, percussion

Technical

- Stuart "Dinky" Dawson – sound engineer
- Alan Douches – mastering engineer
- Clifford Davis – management
