= Hello There Big Boy! =

- Japanese CD release

Studio album by Danny Kirwan
- Released: 21 March 1979
- Recorded: January 1979
- Studios: Kingsway Recorders, London; mixed at DJM Studios, London
- Genres: Pop, rock
- Label: DJM
- Producer: Clifford Davis

Danny Kirwan chronology
Midnight in San Juan (1976)	Hello There Big Boy! (1979)	Ram Jam City (2000)

Hello There Big Boy! is an album by British blues rock musician Danny Kirwan, who was a member of Fleetwood Mac from 1968–72. Released in 1979 on the DJM Records label, this was his last solo album. It was eventually released on CD in February 2006, albeit only in Japan.

== Recording and composition ==
In comparison with Kirwan's other albums, this album contains less of his songwriting input. However, Kirwan wrote or co-wrote five of the nine songs on the album, while the other tracks were contributed by musicians involved in the recording (with the exception of Randy Edelman's "You"). Backing vocalist Tony Rivers provided one song; guitarist Kirby Gregory another, and Dana Gillespie co-wrote one with manager / producer Clifford Davis (under his usual pseudonym of Clifford Adams) as well as singing a duet on one of Kirwan's own songs.

"Only You" was an old Fleetwood Mac song given an update, and was released as a single. Fleetwood Mac's version had not yet been released at that point, though it can now be found on the Volume 1 of the triple Live in Boston set and the Live at the BBC 2-CD set released in 1995. "Caroline" was the single's B-side, written by Kirwan about his ex-wife (although her name was not Caroline), and a sad insight into his state of mind at the time.

It is not clear how much of the lead guitar on the album was played by Kirwan, with Gregory and Bob Weston playing on several tracks, although a press release for the album states that Kirwan took the acoustic guitar solo on "Summer Days and Summer Nights". Producer Davis added the work of 87 outside musicians to the recording, after Kirwan had laid down the basic tracks. On hearing the finished album, Kirwan told Davis that he thought it was "the best thing" he had done. Davis said of the album some years later that it was "so bad...he had to finish it for contractual reasons. I even picked the songs."

== Reception ==
Professional ratings
Review scores
Source	Rating
Allmusic	4/5 stars
Music Week	2/4 stars

Allmusic critic Joe Viglione described the album as "light pop on a mission", and "perfectly produced" by Davis. Comparing "End Up Crying" to the "soft rock" Fleetwood Mac, he also highlights "California" and "Spaceman" as "more accessible than some of the popular versions of Fleetwood Mac". He also singled out the "intricate guitar lines" and "sterling vocals" of "Summer Days and Summer Nights".

== Track listing ==
Side one

1. "Wings of a Dove" (Danny Kirwan) – 2:52
2. "Gettin' the Feelin'" (Tony Rivers) – 3:46
3. "End Up Crying" (Kirby Gregory) – 3:51
4. "Caroline" (Kirwan, Clifford Adams) – 3:08
5. "You" (Randy Edelman) – 3:42

Side two

1. "Only You" (Kirwan) – 3:52
2. "California" (Adams, Dana Gillespie) – 2:35
3. "Spaceman" (Kirwan) – 3:18
4. "Summer Days and Summer Nights" (Kirwan) – 3:32

== Personnel ==
- Danny Kirwan – guitars, vocals
- Kirby Gregory – guitars
- Bob Weston – lead guitar on tracks 2 and 5
- Tex Comer – bass guitar
- Fran Byrne – drums
- John Cook – keyboards
- Kevin Kitchen – electric piano
- Chris Fletcher – percussion
- Dana Gillespie – duet vocal on track 9
- Tony Rivers, Stuart Calver, John Perry – backing vocals
- Arrangements by Clifford Davis and Tony White

== Production ==
- Producer – Clifford Davis
- Engineer – Louie Austin
- Second engineer – Bob Broglia
- Photography & sleeve design – Seabrook Graves Aslett
- Recorded at Kingsway Recorders during January 1979
- Mixed at DJM Studio by Louie Austin

== Release Information ==
- UK – DJM DJF20555 – 21 March 1979 (LP & cassette)
- USA – DJM DJM-22 – 25 April 1979 (LP, cassette & 8-track)
- Canada – DJM 9238-22 – 1979 (LP & cassette)
- Peru – MAG LPN-2583 – 1979 (LP)
- Japan – AMR Archive AIRAC-1177 – 22 February 2006 (CD)

The Japanese CD release came in a cardboard sleeve.
