= Midnight in San Juan =

Midnight in San Juan may refer to:

- Midnight in San Juan (Danny Kirwan album), an album by British blues rock musician Danny Kirwan released 1976
- Midnight in San Juan (Earl Klugh album), a smooth jazz studio album by Earl Klugh released 1991
