= Coming Your Way =

Song by Fleetwood Mac

from the album Then Play On
- A-side: "Rattlesnake Shake"
- Recorded: 6 October 1968, 18 April 1969
- Studio: CBS and De Lane Lea, London
- Genre: Blues rock, hard rock
- Length: 3:47
- Label: Reprise
- Songwriter: Danny Kirwan
- Producer: Fleetwood Mac

"Coming Your Way" is a song by British rock group Fleetwood Mac, written by Danny Kirwan, which first appeared as the opening track on the band's 1969 album Then Play On. It was issued as the B-side to "Rattlesnake Shake" in various territories. A live recording was also included on the band's 1985 Live in Boston album, which was recorded in 1970 at the Boston Tea Party.

== Background ==
The original tracking for "Coming Your Way" occurred on 6 October 1968 at CBS Studio on New Bond Street in London. It was one of seven songs Fleetwood Mac recorded that day along with "Something Inside of Me", "One Sunny Day", "Without You", "Like Crying", "Jigsaw Puzzle Blues", and "Albatross. "Coming Your Way" carried the working title of "Going My Way" and was produced by Mike Vernon and engineered by Mike Ross. In the liner notes for The Complete Blue Horizon Sessions 1967–1969, Kirwan was credited with vocals and guitar, with Mick Fleetwood listed as playing drums and bongos. Peter Green and John McVie also played guitar and bass respectively.

"Coming Your Way" was later re-recorded for Fleetwood Mac's Then Play On studio album, with sessions commencing in April 1969 and Martin Birch serving as the band's audio engineer. It was one of the first two songs recorded for the album along with Kirwan's "Although the Sun is Shining". The session, which took place on 18 April 1969 at De Lane Lea, was the first Fleetwood Mac recording session without Mike Vernon as producer, who split with the band following their switch from Blue Horizon to Immediate Records. Instead, Green served as the producer for the session with assistance from Birch. Jeremy Spencer, who was a member of Fleetwood Mac at the time, did not attend this recording session.

Martin Celmins, who served as Green's biographer, wrote in The Vaudeville Years that Kirwan played all of the guitars on "Coming Your Way". Birch believed that this was because Green wanted Kirwan to become more self-sufficient in the studio by recording his own parts. One take was required to attain the master. Another recording, labelled as "Front Piece", was recorded and appended to the beginning of "Coming Your Way".

On the re-recording of "Coming Your Way", Fleetwood overdubbed some fiberglass conga drums, which he described as being "very flashy". He said that Fleetwood Mac began to "understand the art of overdubbing" around the time that "Coming Your Way" and the rest of Then Play On was recorded. Christine McVie, who at the time was known by her maiden name Christine Perfect, also played some piano passages as a guest musician. On the same day of this recording session, Perfect had sent her notice that she would be leaving the band Chicken Shack.

== Critical reception ==
Writing for New Musical Express, Nick Logan highlighted Fleetwood's "racey [sic] congas and tom toms interlaced with [Kirwan's] guitar and vocal." In a retrospective review, Jeremy McDonagh of PopMatters noted the song's "propulsive percussion" and said that the outro matched the intensity found in Fleetwood Mac's "The Green Manalishi (With the Two Prong Crown)". In AllMusic's review of the album, Michael G. Nastos thought that the song "not only define[d] the Mac's sound, but the rock aesthetic of the day." Mark Blake wrote that "'Coming Your Way' stripped the meat off the blues and threw rattling Afro-Cuban percussion, voodoo rhythms and incantatory lyrics into the mix."

== Personnel ==
- Mick Fleetwood – drums, congas
- John McVie – bass
- Danny Kirwan – guitars, vocals
- Christine Perfect – piano
