= Then Play On =

Studio album by Fleetwood Mac
- Released: 19 September 1969
- Recorded: 1968–1969
- Studios: CBS and De Lane Lea, London
- Genres: Blues rock; psychedelic rock; folk rock; hard rock
- Length: 53:39
- Label: Reprise
- Producer: Fleetwood Mac

Fleetwood Mac chronology
The Pious Bird of Good Omen (1969)	Then Play On (1969)	Fleetwood Mac in Chicago (1969)

Singles from Then Play On
- 1. "Rattlesnake Shake" Released: September 1969 (US)

Then Play On is the third studio album by the British blues rock band Fleetwood Mac, released on 19 September 1969. It was the first of their original albums to feature Danny Kirwan (although two tracks recorded with him were included on the compilation album The Pious Bird of Good Omen released earlier in 1969) and the last with Peter Green. Although still an official band member at the time, Jeremy Spencer did not feature on the album apart from "a couple of piano things" (according to Mick Fleetwood in Q magazine in 1990).

The album offered a broader stylistic range than the straightforward electric blues of the group's first two albums, displaying elements of folk rock, hard rock, art rock and psychedelia. The album reached No. 6 on the UK Albums Chart, becoming the band's fourth Top 20 LP in a row, as well as their third album to reach the Top 10. The album's title, Then Play On, is taken from the opening line of William Shakespeare's play Twelfth Night—"If music be the food of love, play on".

Then Play On is Fleetwood Mac's first release with Reprise Records after being lured away from Blue Horizon and a one-off single with Immediate Records. The label would be the band's home until their self-titled 1975 album, after which they signed to Reprise's parent company Warner Bros. Records. The initial US release of the album omitted two tracks that were previously issued on the American compilation album English Rose, while the second US pressing further abridged the tracklist with the addition of the hit single "Oh Well". The original CD compiled all the songs from the two US LP versions, both of which omitted the English Rose tracks that are on the original UK version.

In August 2013, a remastered edition of the album was reissued on vinyl and CD. This version includes all the tracks from all previous versions of the album, with the original 1969 UK track listing as the main album and both parts of "Oh Well", as well as the 1970 non-album single "The Green Manalishi (With the Two Prong Crown)" and its B-side "World in Harmony", as bonus tracks.

== Background ==
Fleetwood Mac's previous albums had been recorded live in the studio and adhered strictly to the blues formula. For the recording of Then Play On, editing and overdubbing techniques were used extensively for the first time. Fleetwood was adamant about veering away from material that was strictly blues-oriented and told Samuel Graham in a 1978 interview that "we didn't have an exact concept of what we were going to do, but we knew what we weren't going to do, and that was put out another record of Jeremy singing Elmore James.

Jeremy Spencer attended some of the studio sessions and attempted to record a few things for Then Play On, but none of his contributions appeared on any of the album's original tracks. Fleetwood said that the band was "stylistically two bands in one" at the time; this was reflected in their live setlists, which consisted of conventional blues compositions and rock-and-roll covers with Spencer onstage and another portion of the show without Spencer primarily dedicated to extended jams. Green was opposed to the idea of including disparate styles on Then Play On, so the original plan was to release an EP of Spencer compositions to coincide with the album, but the EP was not commercially issued until 1998, when the tracks were included on the band's 1998 compilation album, The Vaudeville Years. In a 1989 interview with Musician magazine, John McVie labeled this EP as his favorite material he ever recorded with Fleetwood Mac.

It was a parody album, which was very funny and technically perfect. It was done as a whole show with different bands in it. It started off with your typical gross MC who introduced this acid band, a blues band, a jazz fusion band and one doing some '50s Fabian-esque cutie music. We'd be playing in each different style, and Jeremy was very much a mimic with a beautifully sarcastic sense of humor. It was full of wanker jokes, vulgar gags and very outrageous stuff. I don't think the record company thought we were serious, but it was great!

— John McVie

Green and Spencer also considered the idea of recording a concept album – "an orchestral-choral LP" – about the life of Jesus Christ, although the album never materialised. Instead, Spencer released a solo album in 1970 with the members of Fleetwood Mac as his backing band. Spencer later said in a 2012 interview that he had only discussed this idea with Green "in passing" and that the project was never seriously pursued.

== Composition ==
Green, the de facto band leader at the time, delegated half of the songwriting to bandmate Danny Kirwan. Music journalist Anthony Bozza remarked that Green "was a very generous band leader in every single way. And Peter gave Danny all of that freedom. You just don’t hear about things like that". Kirwan wrote "Although the Sun is Shining" prior to his tenure in Fleetwood Mac when he was still in his band Boilerhouse. The recording attempted on 18 April 1969 went unused until it resurfaced on The Vaudeville Years compilation album in 1998. Kirwan revisited "Although the Sun Is Shining" the following month; the fourth and final take was included on Then Play On.

Whereas Kirwan wrote several of his songs over the span of two years, Green wanted his songs to be more contemporary and progressive. "Before the Beginning", a Green composition, was first developed in January 1969 during the recording sessions that later produced the band's "Man of the World" single. At the time, "Before the Beginning" was titled "Blues in B flat minor" and was recorded as an instrumental. "Showbiz Blues" also emerged from the same recording sessions under the working title "Do You Give a Damn For Me", which Green dedicated to Bukka White, a slide guitar player who was also the cousin of BB King. Green wrote the song centered around the fingertapping technique that White utilised and re-recorded the song for the Then Play On sessions later in the summer. The final recording that appeared on Then Play On featured less fingertapping than the version from the January recording session. Fleetwood overdubbed some tambourine on the new take; the handclaps were recorded by "whoever was in the studio at the time". "Show-Biz Blues" was one of the songs that the band recorded during sessions at De Lane Lea Studios from 2 July through 4 July. Two takes were completed on the 2 July session, with work resuming the following day, which yielded the master. Kirwan's song "My Dream", which at the time was referred to as "Danny's Instrumental", was also completed during those sessions.

Green wrote "Closing My Eyes" during a time of spiritual awakening when was extensively reading the Bible. "[It] was written around the time I had such a great faith in Jesus that I felt I was walking and talking with God. I wanted to tell people about it, but they turned it round and tried to shatter my dreams." "Like Crying" began with Green singing the lyric "woman's got the blues", which reminded Kirwan of Bessie Smith. Kirwan then wrote the remainder of the song based on Green's initial musical idea.

== Recording ==
Martin Birch, who served as the audio engineer for the album, recalled that Green would frequently come into the recording studio with a demo recorded at home on his Revox. Once Birch familiarised himself with the general feel of the song, the rest of the band would record the basic tracks. He said that the other members would then leave the studio, leaving himself and Green to work on the song until all of the parts were recorded. He repeated the same process with Kirwan and alternated between the two songwriters until the album was complete. Dennis Keen, who served as the band's road manager at the time, said that the band were reliant on Green during the recording sessions.

If Peter didn't get his guitar out, there wouldn't be a sound made. If Peter was late, they'd just spend the time sitting about drinking coffee. Instead of Danny saying 'Oh I've got a number, let's work it out and when Pete comes we'll see what he thinks', they'd do nothing.

— Dennis Keen

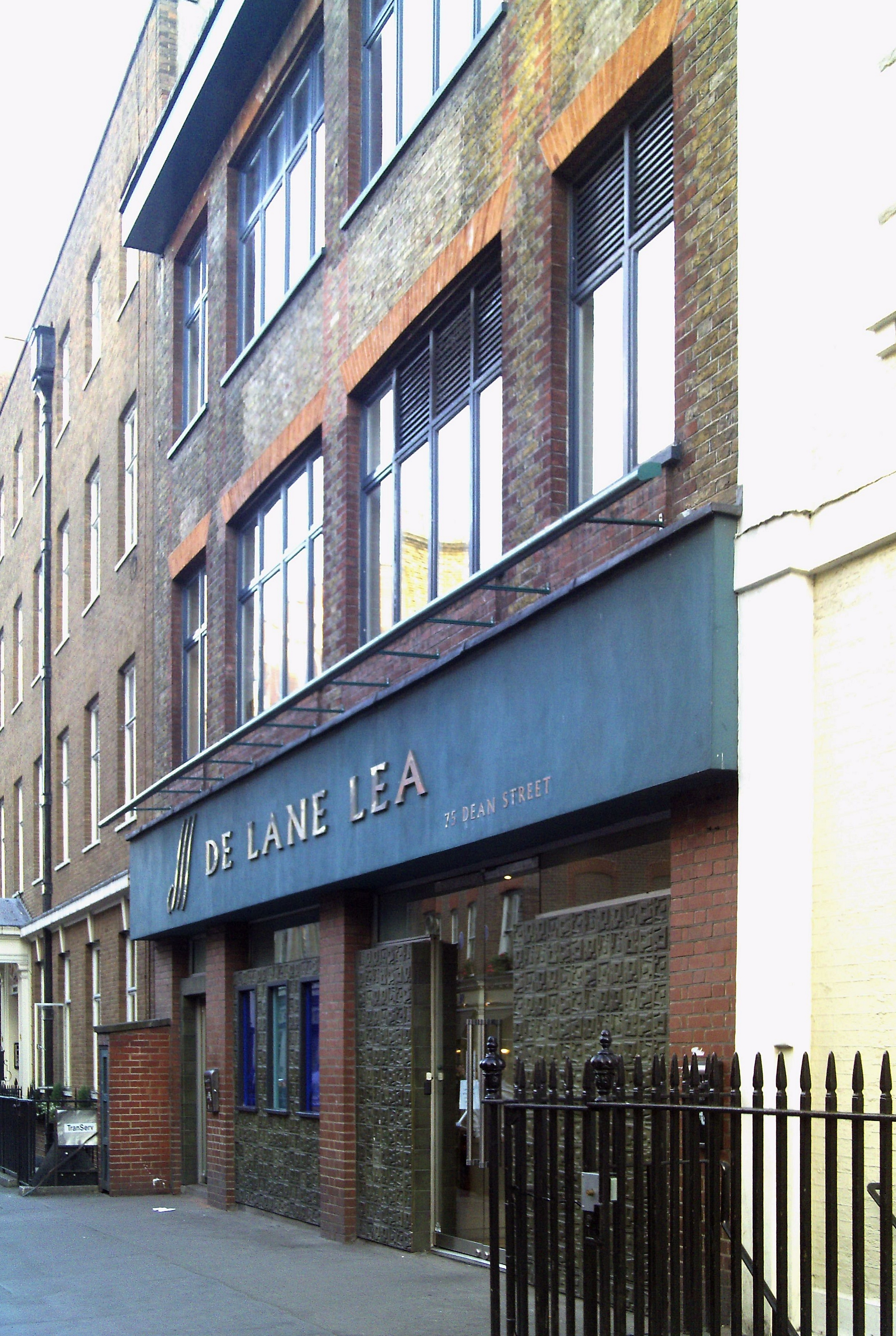
Several songs on Then Play On were recorded at De Lane Lea Studios

Several of Kirwan's tracks, including "One Sunny Day", "Without You", and "Coming Your Way", were originally recorded on 6 October 1968. At the time, "Coming Your Way" carried the working title "Going My Way". These songs were later re-recorded and remixed for Then Play On, with sessions for "Coming Your Way" and "Although The Sun is Shining" beginning in April 1969.

Christine McVie, who at the time was known by her maiden name Christine Perfect, played piano on "Coming Your Way". Kirwan played all of the guitar parts on "Coming Your Way", "My Dream" and "Although the Sun is Shining" as Green wanted him to become more independent and proficient in the recording studio. He also played the Spanish and electric guitars found on "When You Say". His compositions "One Sunny Day" and "Without You" emerged from the same recording session as "Albatross", which was completed when the band were still signed to Blue Horizon. "One Sunny Day" and "Without You" had previously appeared on Fleetwood Mac's English Rose album; the band performed "Without You" for the radio show Top Gear on 27 August 1968. At the time of this performance, "Without You" carried the working title "Crazy for My Baby" and included harmonica playing from Green and a piano part from Spencer; these instruments were not used for the final version that appeared on Then Play On and were replaced with a second guitar played by Green.

Green's friend Paul Morrison remembered that Green spent a considerable time working on tracks alone. Morrison also said that Green would occasionally prevent the rest of the band from entering the recording studio so that he could overdub guitars, bass, and drums himself. He played percussion on a few tracks, including some timpani parts. Some of Green's timpani-playing appeared on "Oh Well", which appeared on later editions of Then Play On. Rattlesnake Shake" was recorded on 15 May 1969 and is underpinned by a riff played by Green on a Fender Bass VI. The sound of a rattlesnake was also overdubbed onto the track.

The band began to embrace jamming in their live performances around the time Then Play On was developed. Three of the tracks on the album, specifically "Underway", "Searching for Madge", and "Fighting for Madge", were compiled by Green from several hours of studio jam sessions. Green told Gianluca Tramontana of Rolling Stone in a 2001 interview that "Underway" was a free-form composition created collectively by the band through jamming, adding that "it was what I used to play before I had my problems." Green was involved with the editing and cutting of these songs and spent time reviewing the tapes; he would then provide feedback to Birch, who mixed the tracks.

The Madge jams were named after a fan of the band who hitchhiked to several of their shows. "Fighting for Madge" was pieced together with two pieces of tape and "Searching for Madge" required the splicing of five snippets of tape taken from an extended jam session. "Searching for Madge" also included an audio clip of someone chuckling, portions of a sped-up and reversed segment from "Underway", and an orchestral recording. A 16-minute version of the Madge jam was later included on The Vaudeville Years.

Much of the album's mixing was conducted by Green and Birch. When the two were working on the two Madge jams, Birch employed panning on the guitar tracks to create the impression of a "guitar duel" between Green and Kirwan.

== Release ==
The band originally told the music press that the title for the album would be Bread & Kunny. In the July 1969 edition of John Mayall's newsletter, Green revealed a tentative track listing with "Before the Beginning" as the first track of side one and "Searching for Madge" as the final track on side two. The tentative track listing was accompanied with a different title for the album: Then Play On. The following month, the band confirmed that the album would be titled Then Play On rather than Bread & Kunny. Then Play On was released in the UK on 19 September 1969.

Then Play On was quickly followed by the non-album single "Oh Well", which reached No. 2 in the UK Singles Chart. "Oh Well" was not initially released as a single in the US, as the band's then-manager Clifford Davis felt that the album track "Rattlesnake Shake" would be a better choice for US single release, although the song did not chart in that country. After the commercial failure of "Rattlesnake Shake", "Oh Well" was chosen as the next single for the US market. "Oh Well" fared better than "Rattlesnake Shake" and became band's first song to chart on the Billboard Hot 100. Davis had also recorded a cover of Green's "Before the Beginning" using members of Fleetwood Mac as his backing band. The recording was adorned with orchestral overdubs and coupled with a cover of Fleetwood Mac's "Man of the World", both of which were released in October by Reprise Records. Another one of Green's compositions, "Closing My Eyes", was covered by David McIvor for Warner Records.

In January 1970, Then Play On was reissued in the US, this time with "Oh Well" in place of "When You Say" and "My Dream". The 2013 remastered CD has the original UK album as tracks 1 to 14 with parts 1 and 2 of "Oh Well", the 1970 non-album single "The Green Manalishi (With the Two Prong Crown)" and its B-side "World in Harmony" as tracks 15 to 18. "One Sunny Day" and "Without You" were not included on the North American edition of the album as they had already been included on the compilation album English Rose.

Spencer expressed disappointment with the album, saying that it "wasn't complete" and "lacked humour." In his 2013 autobiography, Fleetwood called Then Play On his favourite Fleetwood Mac album. Green was also pleased with the album, saying that he "loved every minute of it. There is nothing I feel I could have done better." However, he believed that the band made a mistake in producing the album themselves and said that they "should have kept Mike Vernon", who had produced the band's first two albums. Vernon agreed with Green's assessment and said that he felt disappointed with the album due to his belief that it sounded too "synthetic".

== Artwork ==
The painting used for the album cover artwork is a mural by the English artist Maxwell Armfield. The artwork, which carried the title Domesticated Mural Painting, features a naked man on a galloping horse with a yellow sky in the background. The painting was featured in the February 1917 edition of The Countryside magazine, which noted that the mural was originally designed for the dining room of a London mansion. According to Christine McVie, the original painting belonged to Mick Fleetwood's sister; Classic Rock magazine reported that the painting was in the possession of Mick Fleetwood in a 2013 interview.

== Reception ==
Professional ratings
Review scores
Source	Rating
AllMusic	4.5/5 stars
Blender	5/5 stars
Encyclopedia of Popular Music	4/5 stars
Entertainment Weekly	A−
Record Mirror	4/5 stars
The Rolling Stone Album Guide	4.5/5 stars

Contemporary reception of the album was mixed. Writing for Rolling Stone magazine, John Morthland said Fleetwood Mac had fallen "flat on their faces", and dismissed the album as mostly "nondescript ramblings". Robert Christgau described the album's mixing of "easy ballads and Latin rhythms with the hard stuff" as "odd" but "very good". Melody Maker praised the album, saying that it would "enhance" the Fleetwood Mac's reputation and "surprise anyone who thinks of them as a straight, bashing blues band." Record Mirror characterised Then Play On as "an interesting, progressive LP" that "may not please their blues fans" and called it the band's "most interesting album to date".

Billboard said that the album "gives a good sampling of their blues-with-a-British-accent style of playing". Record World thought that the album possessed creative playing and arrangements and that the bottleneck guitar work evoked music from the 1920s and 1930s. Cashbox called the album "an exciting package that will go far" that was "sure to make [Fleetwood Mac] as popular statewide as in their home."

More recent reviews of the album are highly positive; The New Rolling Stone Album Guide labeling the album as a "cool, blues-based stew" and considered it the second best Fleetwood Mac album. The Daily Telegraph described Then Play On as a "musically expansive, soft edged, psychedelic blues odyssey". Clark Collins of Blender magazine gave the album five stars out of five, and described "Oh Well" as an "epic blues-pop workout".

== Track listing ==
Side one
No.	Title	Writer(s)	Vocals	Length
1.	"Coming Your Way"	Danny Kirwan	Kirwan	3:47
2.	"Closing My Eyes"	Peter Green	Green	4:50
3.	"Fighting for Madge"	Mick Fleetwood	Instrumental	2:45
4.	"When You Say"	Kirwan	Kirwan	4:22
5.	"Show-Biz Blues"	Green	Green	3:50
6.	"Underway"	Green	Instrumental	3:06
7.	"One Sunny Day"	Kirwan	Kirwan	3:12

Side two
No.	Title	Writer(s)	Vocals	Length
8.	"Although the Sun Is Shining"	Kirwan	Kirwan	2:31
9.	"Rattlesnake Shake"	Green	Green	3:32
10.	"Without You"	Kirwan	Kirwan	4:34
11.	"Searching for Madge"	John McVie	Instrumental	6:56
12.	"My Dream"	Kirwan	Instrumental	3:30
13.	"Like Crying"	Kirwan	Kirwan, Green	2:21
14.	"Before the Beginning"	Green	Green	3:28

2013 remaster bonus tracks
No.	Title	Writer(s)	Vocals	Length
15.	"Oh Well – Pt. 1"	Green	Green	3:22
16.	"Oh Well – Pt. 2"	Green	Instrumental	5:39
17.	"The Green Manalishi (With the Two Prong Crown)"	Green	Green	4:37
18.	"World in Harmony"	Kirwan, Green	Instrumental	3:26
Total length:				69:43

=== Alternate track listings ===
Original US LP, September 1969

The two songs ("One Sunny Day" & "Without You") deleted from the US version of the LP had already appeared on the US compilation English Rose, and "Underway" was shortened by about 15 seconds.

Revised US LP, January 1970

When the double-sided single "Oh Well (Parts 1 & 2)" (released November 1969) became a hit, the US LP was re-released in January 1970 with a revised running order to include "Oh Well", dropping Danny Kirwan's "When You Say" and "My Dream" to make room for it. The two parts of "Oh Well" differ widely, the first being hard rock, the latter a meditative instrumental, on which Green played cello.

Other changes include putting the two edits from the "Madge" jams back-to-back, fading down between them. The giggle that previously linked "My Dream" to "Like Crying" ended up, in the previous edit, following the end of "Fighting for Madge" instead. Madge, the press were told at the time, was a female fan of the group.

=== Unreleased bonus EP: The Milton Schlitz Show ===
The original intention was to include a bonus EP in the Then Play On album. The EP was to be compensation for the fact that Jeremy Spencer barely appeared on the album. The EP consisted of Spencer's parodies of doo wop ("Ricky Dee and the Angels"), Alexis Korner, country blues ("Texas Slim"), acid rock ("The Orange Electric Squares"), and John Mayall ("Man of Action"). It was finally released on Fleetwood Mac's The Vaudeville Years compilation in 1998.

No.	Title	Writer(s)	Length
1.	"Jeremy's Contribution to Doo Wop"	Jeremy Spencer	3:34
2.	"Everyday I Have the Blues"	Peter Chatman	4:23
3.	"Death Bells"	Spencer	5:05
4.	"(Watch Out for Yourself) Mr. Jones"	Spencer	3:35
5.	"Man of Action"	Spencer	5:21

== Personnel ==
Fleetwood Mac

- Peter Green – vocals, guitar, harmonica, six string bass, percussion, cello on "Oh Well (Part 2)"
- Danny Kirwan – vocals, guitar
- John McVie – bass guitar
- Mick Fleetwood – drums, percussion
- Jeremy Spencer – piano on "Oh Well (Part 2)"

Additional personnel

- Christine Perfect – uncredited piano
- Sandra Elsdon – uncredited recorders on "Oh Well (Part 2)"

Production

- Fleetwood Mac – producers
- Martin Birch – engineer
- Dinky Dawson – sound consultant

== Charts ==
Weekly chart performance for Then Play On
Chart (1969–2020)	Peak position
Finnish Albums (The Official Finnish Charts)	13
German Albums (Offizielle Top 100)	90
Norwegian Albums (VG-lista)	8
UK Albums (Official Charts)	4
US Billboard 200	109
