= Ram Jam City =

Demo album by Danny Kirwan
- Released: May 2000
- Recorded: 1973–74
- Genre: Rock
- Label: Mooncrest Records

Danny Kirwan chronology
Hello There Big Boy! (1979)	Ram Jam City (2000)

Ram Jam City is an album by British blues rock musician Danny Kirwan, released in 2000. This release consists of demo recordings for his 1975 debut solo album, recorded after leaving Fleetwood Mac in 1972. His solo career was being managed by ex-Mac manager Clifford Davis.

These demos were recorded around 1973–74, and finished tracks for this album were released in 1975 as Second Chapter.

== Track listing ==
- All tracks written by Danny Kirwan.
1. "Mary Jane" – 2:57
2. "Cascades" – 3:11
3. "Falling in Love with You (earlier version with false starts) – 2:56
4. "Odds and Ends" (alternate take) – 2:37
5. "Odds and Ends" – 2:37
6. "Skip a Dee Doo" – 2:45
7. "Hot Summer Day" – 2:38
8. "Second Chapter" – 3:22
9. "Silver Streams" (earlier version) – 3:18
10. "Best Girl in the World" – 2:29
11. "Falling in Love with You" – 2:16
12. "Lovely Days" (with false starts) – 3:40
13. "Ram Jam City" (earlier instrumental version) – 2:38
14. "Silver Streams" – 3:27
15. "Ram Jam City" – 2:43

== Personnel ==
- Danny Kirwan – vocals, guitar
- Andy Silvester – bass guitar
- Paul Raymond – piano
- Geoff Britton – drums
- Jim Russell – drums, percussion
- Released in May 2000 by Mooncrest Records – CRESTCD 044 Z
