= Second Chapter =

Studio album by Danny Kirwan
- Released: 12 September 1975
- Recorded: 1973–74
- Genre: Rock
- Length: 33:58
- Label: DJM
- Producer: Martin Rushent

Danny Kirwan chronology
Second Chapter (1975)	Midnight in San Juan (1976)

Second Chapter is the debut solo album by British blues rock musician Danny Kirwan, released in 1975 on the DJM Records label. This was his first solo album after being dismissed from Fleetwood Mac in 1972, and his solo career was being managed by ex-Mac manager Clifford Davis.

Demo tracks for this album were released on CD in 2000 as Ram Jam City.

== Reception ==
Professional ratings
Review scores
Source	Rating
Allmusic	4/5 stars

Billboard complimented Kirwan's musicianship and thought that Second Chapter "touched on several musical bases" and possessed a "country twinge". They also believed that the album evoked the California sound that his former band Fleetwood Mac had pursued. Allmusic critic Joe Viglione declared that Second Chapter was a feather in the cap for Kirwan as well as producer Martin Rushent. Drawing comparisons with the music of Lindsey Buckingham, Paul McCartney and America, he highlighted the title track, "Love Can Always Bring You Happiness" and "Silver Streams" as the best tracks. He also stated that the album shows Kirwan's importance as a pop artist, and that Fleetwood Mac would have benefitted from his presence in their very successful mid-70s line-up.

== Track listing ==
All songs written by Danny Kirwan.

Side one

1. "Ram Jam City" – 2:48
2. "Odds and Ends" – 2:31
3. "Hot Summer Day" – 2:40
4. "Mary Jane" – 2:54
5. "Skip a Dee Doo" – 2:39
6. "Love Can Always Bring You Happiness" – 3:12

Side two

1. "Second Chapter" – 3:24
2. "Lovely Days" – 2:26
3. "Falling in Love With You" – 2:16
4. "Silver Streams" – 3:27
5. "Best Girl in the World" – 2:31
6. "Cascades" – 3:10

Album variations

- On some versions, "Hot Summer Day" was shown as "Hot Summer's Day".
- "Best Girl in the World" was left off the US version of the album. However, it appeared on the B-side of a 1976 US single featuring the 1969 Fleetwood Mac recording "Man of the World" on the A-side.

== Personnel ==
- Danny Kirwan – guitars, vocals
- Andy Silvester – bass guitar
- Paul Raymond – piano
- Geoff Britton – drums
- Jim Russell – drums, percussion
- Gerry Shury – string arrangements

== Production ==
- Producer / engineer – Martin Rushent
- Photography & album co-ordination – Clifford Davis
- Sleeve design – McKinley Howell & J.M. Heale

== Release information ==
- UK – DJM DJPLS454 (LP) / DJM DJH40454 (cassette) – 12 September 1975
- USA – DJM DJLPA-1 – 1975 (LP & cassette), distributed by Amherst Records
- Japan –

DJM IFS 80431 – 1975 (LP)
AMR Archive AIRAC-1175 – 22 February 2006 (CD)

- Germany – Repertoire REP 4370-WP – 1993 (CD)

The UK and US LP releases came in a gatefold sleeve, and the Japanese CD release came in a cardboard sleeve.
