= Fleetwood Mac in Chicago =

Studio album by Fleetwood Mac
- Released: 5 December 1969
- Recorded: 4 January 1969
- Studios: Chess Ter-Mar, Chicago
- Genre: Chicago blues
- Length: 103:28
- Labels: Blue Horizon; Epic; Sire (US)
- Producers: Mike Vernon; Marshall Chess

Fleetwood Mac chronology
Then Play On (1969)	Fleetwood Mac in Chicago (1969)	Kiln House (1970)

Alternative cover

Blues Jam in Chicago is a studio recording by the British rock band Fleetwood Mac, originally released in two single-LP volumes by Blue Horizon in December 1969. It was the result of a recording session in early 1969 at Chess Records in Chicago with Fleetwood Mac, then a young British blues band, and a number of famous Chicago blues artists from whom they drew inspiration. The album has also been released, with slightly different track listings, under the titles Blues Jam at Chess Volumes One and Two and Fleetwood Mac in Chicago, the latter by Sire Records in 1975.

The members of Fleetwood Mac at the time of this recording were Peter Green (guitar, vocals), Jeremy Spencer (guitar, vocals), Danny Kirwan (guitar, vocals), Mick Fleetwood, (drums), and John McVie (bass guitar). The Chicago blues musicians who played at this session were Otis Spann (piano, vocals), Willie Dixon (upright bass), Shakey Horton (harmonica, vocals), J.T. Brown (tenor saxophone, vocals), Buddy Guy (guitar), Honeyboy Edwards (guitar, vocals), and S.P. Leary (drums).

In December 2022, a book of Jeff Lowenthal's photographs of the session was published as Fleetwood Mac in Chicago: The Legendary Chess Blues Session, January 4, 1969. The book also contains forwards by session producers Marshall Chess and Mike Vernon and texts by Robert Schaffner and some of the participating musicians.

== Background ==
In January 1969, Fleetwood Mac were in Chicago opening for Muddy Waters at the Regal Theater when their producer Mike Vernon heard that the Chess Record Studio was about to close. He contacted Marshall Chess, who was one of the co-founders of Chess Records to schedule a recording session at the facility. Melody Maker discussed the recording sessions in their 11 January 1969 edition of the publication and said that Buddy Guy, Shakey Horton, and Willie Dixon were among the musicians who participated, the latter of whom also organized the sessions.

Blues Jam in Chicago was recorded when Fleetwood Mac were still under their contract with Blue Horizon, although by the time the album was released in December, they were instead signed to Reprise Records. After the Fleetwood Mac's record deal with Blue Horizon lapsed, the band purchased most of their catalogue from the label, although their material with Dixon from the Chess recording sessions was retained by Blue Horizon.

Green expressed his disappointment that Blues Jam was released soon after their studio album Then Play On, which at the time was still on the charts in the United Kingdom. He believed that Blues Jam was inferior to both Then Play On and its predecessor, Mr. Wonderful and expressed his belief that "the bulk of our fans won't like it, because a lot of the blues fans have dropped us, like they do, because we'd been on television and had hits. I get a bit angry about this sort of old release." Reflecting on his experiences at Chess in a 1999 interview, Green dismissed the recording sessions as a "non-event", adding that "the rest of the band wasn't into it, and we did not play well".

In the United States, Billboard listed Blues Jam as one of its new releases in the 8 May 1971 edition of the magazine. It entered the Billboard 200 on 1 July 1971 at No. 193. The album was later reissued by Sire Records in 1975, with this edition of the album reaching a peak position of No. 118.

== Critical reception ==
Professional ratings
Review scores
Source	Rating
Christgau's Record Guide	B+

Writing in Rolling Stone in 1976, Greil Marcus said, "Thanks to the near-permanent success of the current Fleetwood Mac LP, virtually all the band's pre-Warner Bros. material – featuring guitarists Peter Green, Danny Kirwan and Jeremy Spencer – is back on the market. The best stuff is to be found on Fleetwood Mac in Chicago (Sire), a double album cut in '69 at the Chess studios, with real-life black bluesmen sitting in.... The Fleetwood Mac that cut this album was a rough, derivative band, full of enthusiasm and committed to their music... The shade of Elmore James smiled on the band, and never more so than on Chicago..."

AllMusic said, "Put together on short notice, and recorded in one day, the sessions have something of a ramshackle feel, but the energy of the performances transcends any shortcomings on this date...." "Given that the Peter Green-led Fleetwood Mac was already deeply rooted in Chicago blues, the project proved to be a natural for the group..."

Robert Christgau wrote, "Knowledgeable song selection, expressive playing – especially by Peter Green, who filters B.B. King through Santo & Johnny with a saxophonist's sense of line – and lots of help from Otis Spann, Willie Dixon, Shakey Horton, and others makes the thinness of the singing seem like a tribute to a new tradition."

On Analog Planet, Michael Fremer said, "Whatever you think of the blues, you gotta love the sound of these recordings, and more importantly the spirited playing as the veterans join in the fun of playing with the white youngsters from across the sea. These are jams – surprisingly tight ones – with snippets of producer Mike Vernon's communication between the recording booth and the studio left in between the music to help give you an indication of how the tunes were conceived."

== Track listing ==
=== Blues Jam at Chess ===
Side A

1. "Watch Out" (Peter Green) – 4:20 – vocals: Peter Green
2. "Ooh Baby" (Howlin' Wolf) – 4:05 – vocals: Peter Green
3. "South Indiana" (take 1) (Walter Horton) – 3:21 – instrumental
4. "South Indiana" (take 2) (Walter Horton) – 3:46 – instrumental
5. "Last Night" (Little Walter Jacobs) – 5:01 – vocals: Peter Green
6. "Red Hot Jam" (Peter Green) – 6:02 – instrumental

Side B

1. "I'm Worried" (Elmore James) – 3:46 – vocals: Jeremy Spencer
2. "I Held My Baby Last Night" (Elmore James, Jules Taub) – 5:16 – vocals: Jeremy Spencer
3. "Madison Blues" (Elmore James) – 4:55 – vocals: Jeremy Spencer
4. "I Can't Hold Out" (Elmore James) – 4:48 – vocals: Jeremy Spencer
5. "I Need Your Love" (Walter Horton) – 4:31 – vocals: Shakey Horton
6. "I Got the Blues" (Walter Horton) – 3:59 – vocals: Shakey Horton

Side C

1. "World's in a Tangle" (Jimmy Rogers) – 5:25 – vocals: Danny Kirwan
2. "Talk With You" (Danny Kirwan) – 3:27 – vocals: Danny Kirwan
3. "Like It This Way" (Danny Kirwan) – 4:24 – vocals: Danny Kirwan
4. "Someday Soon Baby" (Otis Spann) – 7:36 – vocals: Otis Spann
5. "Hungry Country Girl" (Otis Spann) – 5:46 – vocals: Otis Spann

Side D

1. "Black Jack Blues" (J. T. Brown) – 5:08 – vocals: J.T. Brown
2. "Everyday I Have the Blues" (Memphis Slim) – 4:54 – vocals: Jeremy Spencer
3. "Rockin' Boogie" (Jeremy Spencer) – 3:57 – instrumental
4. "Sugar Mama" (Howlin' Wolf) – 6:08 – vocals: Peter Green
5. "Homework" (Dave Clark, Al Perkins) – 3:20 – vocals: Peter Green

=== Blues Jam in Chicago, Volume One ===
1. "Watch Out"
2. "Ooh Baby"
3. "South Indiana" (take 1)
4. "South Indiana" (take 2)
5. "Last Night"
6. "Red Hot Jam" (take 1) – instrumental *
7. "Red Hot Jam" (take 2)
8. "I'm Worried"
9. "I Held My Baby Last Night"
10. "Madison Blues"
11. "I Can't Hold Out"
12. "Bobby's Rock" (Elmore James) – instrumental *
13. "I Need Your Love"
14. "Horton's Boogie Woogie" (take 1) (Walter Horton) – vocals: Shakey Horton *
15. "I Got the Blues"

* Bonus track

=== Blues Jam in Chicago, Volume Two ===
1. "World's in a Tangle"
2. "Talk With You"
3. "Like It This Way"
4. "Someday Soon Baby"
5. "Hungry Country Girl"
6. "Black Jack Blues"
7. "Everyday I Have the Blues"
8. "Rockin' Boogie"
9. "My Baby's Gone" (David Edwards) – vocals: Honeyboy Edwards *
10. "Sugar Mama" (take 1) – vocals: Peter Green *
11. "Sugar Mama" (take 2)
12. "Homework"
13. "Honey Boy Blues" (David Edwards) – instrumental *
14. "I Need Your Love" (take 1) (Jimmy Rogers) – vocals: Shakey Horton *
15. "Horton's Boogie Woogie" (take 2) – vocals: Shakey Horton *
16. "Have a Good Time" (Walter Horton) – vocals: Shakey Horton *
17. "That's Wrong" (Walter Horton) – vocals: Shakey Horton *
18. "Rock Me Baby" (Lil' Son Jackson) – vocals: Shakey Horton*

* Bonus track

== Personnel ==
Fleetwood Mac

- Peter Green – guitar, vocals
- Jeremy Spencer – guitar, vocals
- Danny Kirwan – guitar, vocals
- John McVie – bass
- Mick Fleetwood – drums

Chicago blues artists

- Otis Spann – piano, vocals
- Willie Dixon – upright bass
- Walter "Shakey" Horton – harmonica, vocals
- J. T. Brown – tenor saxophone, vocals
- Buddy Guy – guitar
- David "Honeyboy" Edwards – guitar, vocals
- S.P. Leary – drums

Production

- Produced by Mike Vernon and Marshall Chess
- Engineering: Stu Black
- Photography: Jeff Lowenthal

== Charts ==
Chart (1976)	Peak position
US Billboard 200	118
