= Oh Well (Fleetwood Mac song) =

1969 song by Fleetwood Mac

- Cover of the French release: (back row, L-R) McVie, Kirwan, Green (front row L-R) Spencer, Fleetwood

Single by Fleetwood Mac
- A-side: "Oh Well (Part 1)"
- B-side: "Oh Well (Part 2)"
- Released: 26 September 1969
- Recorded: Summer 1969
- Studio: De Lane Lea Studios
- Genre: Blues rock; hard rock; folk rock; psychedelic rock
- Length: 3:22 (Part 1 single); 2:22 (Part 1); 5:39 (Part 2); 8:56 (Then Play On version)
- Label: Reprise
- Songwriter: Peter Green
- Producer: Fleetwood Mac

Fleetwood Mac singles chronology
"Man of the World" (1969)	"Oh Well" (1969)	"The Green Manalishi (With the Two Prong Crown)" (1970)

Alternative cover
- Side A of the UK single

"Oh Well" is a song by British rock band Fleetwood Mac, released in 1969 and composed by vocalist and lead guitarist Peter Green. It first appeared as a single in various countries in 1969 and subsequently appeared on US versions of that year's Then Play On album and the band's Greatest Hits album in 1971. The song was later featured on the 1992 boxed set 25 Years – The Chain, on the 2002 compilation album The Best of Peter Green's Fleetwood Mac, and on the 2018 compilation 50 Years – Don't Stop.

"Oh Well" was composed in two parts, with "Part 1" as a fast electric blues song with vocals (lasting 2:19), and "Part 2" as an entirely different instrumental piece with a classical influence (lasting 5:39). The original 1969 single features the first minute of part 2 as a fade-out coda to the A-side and then part 2 begins again on the B-side. Later releases varied in length.

During concerts, only the first part was played, and live versions of the song have been released on a handful of Fleetwood Mac live albums throughout their career such as Live and Live at the BBC, as well as the B-sides of singles. After Green's departure from Fleetwood Mac, the song was sung by various other members, including Bob Welch, Dave Walker, Lindsey Buckingham, Billy Burnette, and Mike Campbell. During live performances with the original lineup, Spencer frequently played supplemental percussion during the song, often maracas.

== Composition ==
Peter Green wrote what would become part 2 of "Oh Well" on a Ramirez Spanish guitar, which he purchased after hearing the instrument on the radio. Part 1, which Green dismissed as a "throwaway riff", was intended to appear on the B-side of part 2, but part 1 was ultimately selected as the A-side instead. He characterised the full composition as a representation of his "two extremes" and said that it was his "first sort of semiclassical attempt". In a 1983 interview, Green cited Muddy Waters as the inspiration for the song title.

Recording sessions took place on 3 August 1969 at De Lane Lea Studios in London. All members of Fleetwood Mac were in attendance for the session, including Jeremy Spencer, who last joined the band in the recording studio in January 1969 for what was later released as Blues Jam in Chicago in December of that year. The band recorded Part 1 in four takes, with Spencer on maracas. According to the rock historian Christopher Hjort, "Oh Well Part 2" was either recorded on the same day or on an undated session.

The first part of the song consists of an eight bar blues riff played by Green on a Michigan dobro-style resonator guitar, then joined by an electric guitar, bass guitar and various percussion instruments played by Mick Fleetwood, including maracas and a cowbell. Green sings a brief verse with no musical accompaniment, before the riff begins again and breaks into a rock shuffle with a guitar solo that lasts 16 measures. The cowbell solo was an unplanned addition that Fleetwood played by accident, but Green liked the part and insisted on keeping it in the mix. In his 2014 memoir, Fleetwood recalled that he encountered difficulties nailing the cowbell part for live performances and worried that he would "never get it".

Where the second part follows, there is a brief pause before Green's sombre, Spanish-style acoustic guitar and low electric guitar, leading into further instrumental passages of cello, recorder, and piano. Green's then-girlfriend, Sandra Elsdon, played some of the recorder parts and Jeremy Spencer overdubbed the piano parts. Melody Maker reported in its 30 August 1969 publication that "Oh Well" was the first Fleetwood Mac song to feature cello playing from Green. According to Elsdon, who maintained that she lacked "any musical skills", the last few recorder notes on the song were played by her, whereas the remainder of the recorder playing was covered by Green.

Peter bought me a flute, and he bought recorders, and we used to mess around. He could pick up anything and play anything. I don't remember how it came about that I would play the last little piece on that, but I screwed up, so I'm only really playing a few notes at the end. Peter's playing some of that, and then the last few notes are mine.

— Sandra Elsdon

== Release ==
Instead of including "Oh Well" on the UK track listing of Then Play On, the label chose the song as the band's next single, which came as a surprise to Green, who expected Kirwan's "When You Say" to receive that designation. Hesitant to release "Oh Well (Part 1)" as a single, Green lobbied to make "Oh Well (Part 2)" the A-side instead, but to no avail. He believed that Part 1 was more likely to receive airplay and thought that Part 2 would "take a few listens to get used to".

Fleetwood said that the band initially thought "Oh Well" should be the band's next single upon the song's completion, but he and McVie doubted its commercial viability upon listening to it again. In an October 1969 interview with NME, Green said that he "would not be surprised" if the single did not perform well and admitted that he would be "disheartened" if this was the case. Fleetwood and McVie bet Green money that "Oh Well" would fail to chart on the grounds that it was "too sad", but the single instead went on to chart in several territories, including number two in the UK and number 55 in the US.

After the single was released, US versions of Then Play On were updated to include the song, replacing Kirwan's "When You Say" and "My Dream". The album edit of "Oh Well" joined the two sides of the single as one track, entitled "Oh Well" (lasting 8:56), so that the second part's beginning is heard twice. It was repeated on the worldwide original CD release. A 1972 US reissue of the single featured just the electric "Oh Well (Part 1)" without the coda. Other reissues of the song, including on the Greatest Hits album and the 2013 deluxe Then Play On, feature the original single releases of part 1 (with coda) and part 2 as two separate tracks.

== Chart performance ==
The single's peak position on the UK charts was No. 2 for two weeks in November 1969, spending a total of 16 weeks on the chart. In the Dutch Top 40, the song peaked at No. 1 and spent a total of 11 weeks in the top 40. It also reached the top 5 in Ireland, Norway, and New Zealand, as well as the top 10 in Germany and Switzerland.

"Oh Well" was a minor hit in the United States, where it debuted on Billboard's Bubbling Under chart in January 1970. That same month, the song entered the Billboard Hot 100 at number 81. The song eventually peaked at No. 55, spending a total of ten weeks on the chart. It was Fleetwood Mac's first single to reach the Hot 100 and their only pre-Buckingham/Nicks song to earn this distinction.

In Canada, the song reached No. 54. It was their second charting single after "Albatross" in March 1969.

The single was also issued in Argentina, Brazil, India, Italy, Japan, Lebanon, Mexico (as "Ah Bueno"), Portugal and Spain (as "Muy Bien"), and South Africa and Venezuela (as "Oh Bien") on Reprise Records. Other countries included Greece on Warner Bros. Records and Malaysia on Jaguare Records.

== Legacy ==
"Oh Well (Part 1)" has been viewed by music critics as one of the early crossovers between blues rock and heavy metal. The Led Zeppelin song "Black Dog" (1971) also features a call and response with a cappella vocals - Jimmy Page was inspired to structure the song like "Oh Well". John Brackett, a former professor from the University of Utah, notes that both songs employ "a syncopated ascending chromatic motif that finishes with a long sustained note."

Upon its release in 1969, Peter Jones of Record Mirror said that the song seemed "a bit ponderous, despite some excellent moments". In 1972, Record World said the song "shows [the] group in its finest moment." The Guardian and Paste ranked "Oh Well, Part 1" number 21 and number 8 respectively on their lists of the 30 greatest Fleetwood Mac songs. Rolling Stone also ranked the song number nine on their list of the top 50 greatest Fleetwood Mac songs.

== Personnel ==
Oh Well (Part 1)

- Peter Green – vocals, electric guitar, dobro
- Danny Kirwan – electric guitar
- John McVie – bass
- Mick Fleetwood – drums, cowbell, congas
- Jeremy Spencer – maracas

Oh Well (Part 2)

- Peter Green – classical guitar, electric guitar, bass, cello, recorder, timpani, clash cymbals
- Jeremy Spencer – piano

Additional Personnel

- Sandra Elsdon – additional recorder

== Charts ==
=== Weekly charts ===
Chart (1969–70)	Peak position
Australia	17
Austria	6
Belgium (Ultratop 50 Flanders)	3
Belgium (Ultratop 50 Wallonia)	5
Canada (RPM)	54
Germany	5
Ireland	5
Netherlands (Dutch Top 40)	1
Netherlands (Single Top 100)	1
Norway	3
Switzerland	6
UK Singles (Official Charts)	2
US Billboard Hot 100	55

== Cover versions and other uses ==
"Oh Well" has been covered by various other artists and groups, including Billy Gibbons, Deep Purple, Tom Petty and the Heartbreakers, 2Cellos, Kenny Wayne Shepherd, Monks of Doom, Gordon Giltrap, Joe Jackson, The Rockets, Big Country, Tribe of Gypsies, Ratt, Tourniquet, McCoy, John Parr, Oh Well, Haim, Aerosmith, Darrell Mansfield, Zona B and Jason Isbell and the 400 Unit. The song has also been played live by Jimmy Page & the Black Crowes and released on their 2000 album Live at the Greek. The Australian singer-songwriter Rick Springfield performed a version of the song in July 2013 for The A.V. Club's A.V. Undercover series. Eels included a cover of the song on the bonus-disc edition of their 2014 album The Cautionary Tales of Mark Oliver Everett, and it is also found on the 2012 album Fifteen by Colin James.

Former Fleetwood Mac member Bob Welch recorded a version of the song for the 2003 His Fleetwood Mac Years & Beyond album. To outline the sections, Welch played his guitars along to the original recording so his cover would "closely match the original, but not be exact copies." After he recorded the guitars, Welch gradually muted the original recording and filled out the song with samples and MIDI tracks. Over the course of a couple weeks, Welch had amassed between 64 and 96 tracks, which he condensed into 32 tracks on his master recording through a series of premixes.

An excerpt from the song can be heard in the Doctor Who story Spearhead from Space. It was filmed around the same time that the single was on the chart, and transmitted in January 1970. The song was omitted from later video releases of the story, but was reintroduced on the DVD release in 2011. The beginning of the song from Live in Boston by Fleetwood Mac can be heard in the second season of the television show Fargo.
