= Midnight in San Juan (Danny Kirwan album) =

- Japanese CD release

Studio album by Danny Kirwan
- Released: September 1976; 1977 (USA & Canada)
- Genre: Rock
- Label: DJM
- Producer: Clifford Davis

Danny Kirwan chronology
Second Chapter (1975)	Midnight in San Juan (1976)	Hello There Big Boy! (1979)

North American cover
- Danny Kirwan, as released in the USA and Canada

Midnight in San Juan is the second solo album by British blues rock musician Danny Kirwan, who was a member of Fleetwood Mac from 1968–72. Released in 1976, this was his second of three solo albums with the DJM Records label.

This album was released in the USA and Canada in May 1977 under the title Danny Kirwan, with a different sleeve (front and back) and a biography / review written by Michael Hogan. The recorded material is identical to the UK release. It was released for the first time on CD, only in Japan, in February 2006.

== Songs and backing band ==
Apart from the self-penned tracks, Kirwan includes a reggae-style cover of The Beatles' "Let It Be", which was a single in the United States. The other single from this album was "Misty River". Another cover version was "Look Around You", written by Dave Walker, himself an ex-Fleetwood Mac member.

Kirwan's backing band on the album was made up of members of Stretch; an earlier incarnation of Stretch had briefly toured as a bogus version of Fleetwood Mac in 1974.

== Reception ==
Professional ratings
Review scores
Source	Rating
AllMusic	4/5 stars

Allmusic critic Joe Viglione claimed that the album was "chock-full of quality material – there isn't a bad track on it musically". Raising comparisons with America, The Beatles, Kirwan's last album with Fleetwood Mac, Bare Trees, and also the music of his old bandmate Bob Welch, he suggested that Kirwan's record label should have supported the album more strongly. Viglione gave particular credit for Kirwan's creative treatment of "Let It Be", rather than simply covering the Beatles song note for note.

== Track listing ==
- All tracks written by Danny Kirwan, except where stated.

Side One

1. "I Can Tell" – 3:02
2. "Life Machine" – 2:26
3. "Midnight in San Juan" – 2:38
4. "Let It Be" (John Lennon, Paul McCartney) – 2:28
5. "Angel's Delight" – 2:47
6. "Windy Autumn Day" – 2:38

Side Two

1. "Misty River" – 3:59
2. "Rolling Hills" – 2:25
3. "I Can't Let You Go" – 2:42
4. "Look Around You" (Dave Walker) – 3:09
5. "Castaway" – 3:47

== Personnel ==
- Danny Kirwan – guitars, vocals
- Steve Emery – bass guitar
- Jeff Rich – drums
- John Cook – piano

== Production ==
- Producer – Clifford Davis Productions Ltd
- Engineers – Louie Austin, Simon Davis
- Sleeve Design: McKinley/Howell

== Release information ==
- UK – DJM DJF20481 – 1 September 1976 (LP & cassette)
- USA – DJM DJLPA-9 – May 1977 (LP, cassette & 8-track). Titled Danny Kirwan.
- Canada – DJM – 1977 (LP & cassette)
- Japan – AMR Archive AIRAC-1175 – 22 February 2006 (CD)

The Japanese CD release came in a cardboard sleeve.
