= When You Say =

1969 single by Christine McVie

Song by Fleetwood Mac

from the album Then Play On
- Released: 1969
- Recorded: 2 July 1969
- Genre: Blues rock, folk rock
- Length: 4:22
- Label: Reprise
- Songwriter: Danny Kirwan
- Producer: Fleetwood Mac

"When You Say"

Single by Christine Perfect a.k.a. Christine McVie

from the album Christine Perfect
- B-side: "No Road Is the Right Road"
- Released: October 1969
- Recorded: September 1969
- Genre: Blues rock
- Length: 3:14
- Label: Blue Horizon
- Songwriter: Danny Kirwan
- Producer: Danny Kirwan

Christine Perfect a.k.a. Christine McVie singles chronology
"When You Say" (1969)	"I'm Too Far Gone (To Turn Around)" (1970)

"When You Say" is a song by British rock group Fleetwood Mac written by guitarist Danny Kirwan, which first appeared on their 1969 album Then Play On as the fourth track on the album. It was also recorded by Christine Perfect as her debut single, which was later included on her self-titled album in 1970.

== Background ==
=== Fleetwood Mac version ===
According to an NME article written by Nick Logan, Kirwan played both electric and Spanish guitars on "When You Say" and also contributed lead vocals. In his book Strange Brew: Eric Clapton and the British Boom, Christopher Hjort instead listed Peter Green as the lead guitarist for the session and Kirwan as the rhythm guitarist. The recording session for "When You Say" took place on 2 July 1969, with the sixth take being used as the master.

Green originally wanted "When You Say" to be released as the first single from their 1969 album Then Play On, but his song "Oh Well" was selected instead. In an interview with NME prior to the release of Then Play On, Green commented that "When You Say" was "one of the best things [Kirwan has] ever done". Following the commercial success of "Oh Well", "When You Say" was one of the two songs dropped from the track listing of Then Play On to make room for "Oh Well". Nick Logan of NME found "When You Say" to be "simple, appealing and effective."

=== Christine Perfect version ===
In September 1969, the song was recorded as the debut solo single by former Chicken Shack keyboardist/vocalist Christine Perfect, then wife of Fleetwood Mac bass guitarist John McVie. Danny Kirwan, who was the songwriter behind "When You Say", produced Perfect's rendition and provided the song's arrangement. The B-side of the single was "No Road Is the Right Road", written by Perfect. The single was announced in the 29 September 1969 edition of Melody Maker and the publication also provided an expected release date of 17 October 1969 under the Blue Horizon label.

Writing for Melody Maker, Chris Welch found the string arrangement on Perfect's "When You Say" to be dated but thought that she sang the song "in fetching fashion". He also characterised it as a "weird ballad". Derek Johnson of NME called the song a "beautiful ballad with classical leanings" but questioned whether the single would have "mass appeal". The single was a commercial failure, partly due to Perfect's refusal to appear on the BBC TV music show Top of the Pops in favor of a vacation with John McVie in Greece. However, McVie did record a performance of the song with the Derek Wadsworth Orchestra for a BBC Radio 1 radio programme presented by John Peel, which was broadcast on 1 November 1969.

== Track listing ==
- UK vinyl (Blue Horizon – 57-3165)
1. "When You Say" – 3:11
2. "No Road is the Right Road – 2:52

== Personnel ==
=== Fleetwood Mac version ===
- Danny Kirwan – guitars, vocals
- Peter Green – possible lead guitar
- John McVie – bass guitar

=== Christine Perfect version ===
- Christine Perfect – vocals, keyboards
- Danny Kirwan – guitar
- John McVie – bass guitar
- Top Topham – guitar on b-side
- Rick Hayward – guitar on b-side
- Martin Dunsford – bass guitar on b-side
- Chris Hardings – drums on b–side
