= J. T. Brown (musician) =

American blues saxophonist (1918–1969)

- Also known as: Saxman Brown, J. T. (Big Boy) Brown, Bep Brown
- Born: John Thomas Brown; April 2, 1918; Mississippi, U.S.
- Died: November 24, 1969 (aged 51) Chicago
- Genres: Blues
- Instrument: Tenor saxophone

John Thomas Brown (April 2, 1918 – November 24, 1969) was an American tenor saxophonist of the Chicago blues era. He was variously billed as Saxman Brown, J. T. (Big Boy) Brown, Bep Brown, Nature Boy Brown and J.T. "Blow It" Brown during his career.

== Biography ==
Born John Thomas Brown in Mississippi, he was a member of the Rabbit's Foot Minstrels and spent some time in Memphis, Tennessee, before moving to Chicago. He worked as a session musician for several artists and made some records on Harlem and United, among other labels, in the 1950s. "Round House Boogie" / "Kickin' the Blues Around", "Sax-ony Boogie", and "Dumb Woman Blues" were issued under various band names by Meteor Records in this period.

Brown later played and recorded with Elmore James and Howlin Wolf. He also recorded as a leader for several independent record labels, including JOB and United. He appeared on several tracks of Fleetwood Mac's 1969 album Fleetwood Mac in Chicago, on which he sang his own composition, "Black Jack Blues".

He died in Chicago in November 1969, at the age of 51. He was interred at the Burr Oak Cemetery, in Worth, Illinois.

On May 14, 2011, the fourth annual White Lake Blues Festival took place at the Howmet Playhouse Theater in Whitehall, Michigan. The concert was organized by executive producer Steve Salter, of the nonprofit organization Killer Blues, to raise money to honor Brown's unmarked grave with a headstone. The event was a success, and a headstone was placed in June 2011.

== Discography ==
As bandleader

- Windy City Boogie (Pearl, 1977)

Compilation

- The Chronological J.T. Brown 1950-54 (Classics (Blues & Rhythm series), 2005)

With Fleetwood Mac, Otis Spann, Willie Dixon, Big Walter Horton, Buddy Guy, Honeyboy Edwards and S.P. Leary

- Blues Jam in Chicago, Vol. One (Blue Horizon, 1969)
- Blues Jam at Chess (Blue Horizon, 1969)

With Fleetwood Mac, Otis Spann, Willie Dixon, Big Walter Horton, Buddy Guy, Honeyboy Edwards and S.P. Leary

- Blues Jam in Chicago, Vol. Two (Blue Horizon, 1970)

With Howlin' Wolf

- The Real Folk Blues (Chess, 1956-64 [1965])

== See also ==
- List of Chicago blues musicians
- List of electric blues musicians
