= I Can't Hold Out =

1960 song by Elmore James

Single by Elmore James
- B-side: "The Sun Is Shining"
- Released: May 1960
- Recorded: Chicago, April 1960
- Genre: Blues
- Length: 2:12
- Label: Chess
- Songwriter: Willie Dixon
- Producers: Leonard Chess, Phil Chess

Elmore James singles chronology
"The Sky Is Crying" (1960)	"I Can't Hold Out" (1960)	"Rollin' and Tumblin'" (1960)

"I Can't Hold Out", also known as "Talk to Me Baby", is a blues song written by Willie Dixon and recorded by Elmore James in 1960 for the Chess label. Called a classic and a "popular James standard", it has been interpreted and recorded by several artists.

== Composition and recording ==
Blues arranger/songwriter Willie Dixon wrote "Talk to Me Baby (I Can't Hold Out)" in late 1958 or 1959 in Los Angeles while he was on tour with Memphis Slim. According to Dixon, he was inspired to write the song after a telephone conversation with his wife Marie.

I just talked to my baby, on the telephone
She said 'Stop what you're doin', and come on home'
I can't hold out, I can't hold out too long
I get a real good feelin', talkin' to you on the phone

When Dixon returned to Chicago, Elmore James had a recording session for Chess Records and invited Dixon to participate. Together, they "made that 'Talk to Me Baby (I Can't Hold Out Too Long)'", although Dixon does not perform on the song and James is given the composer credit on the label. For the recording session, James, who sang and played slide guitar, was accompanied by his long-time backing band the Broomdusters: J. T. Brown on saxophone, Johnny Jones on piano, Odie Payne on drums, and Homesick James on guitar.

== Releases ==
"I Can't Hold Out" has been described as a "jumping 'Dust My Broom' styled number ... that featured Dixon's trademark stop-time arrangement after each verse". After recording the song in April 1960, Chess prepared for a rush release of the single in May 1960, to capitalize on the success of James' previous single for Fire Records, "The Sky Is Crying", which was then entering the Billboard R&B chart. Elmore James was listed as the songwriter on the single and in an early BMI registration.

In February 1963 during his last recording session, Elmore James re-recorded the song during a "thrown together session" with New York session musicians for the Fire/Fury/Enjoy record labels. When this version of the song was later released on various budget compilation albums (it was not released as a single), it was titled "Talk to Me Baby". When the original song was included on the 1969 Chess compilation album Whose Muddy Shoes, it was re-titled "Talk to Me Baby" and credited to Willie Dixon. Subsequent appearances of the song are often titled "Talk to Me Baby".
