= Danny Kirwan =

British rock musician (1950–2018)

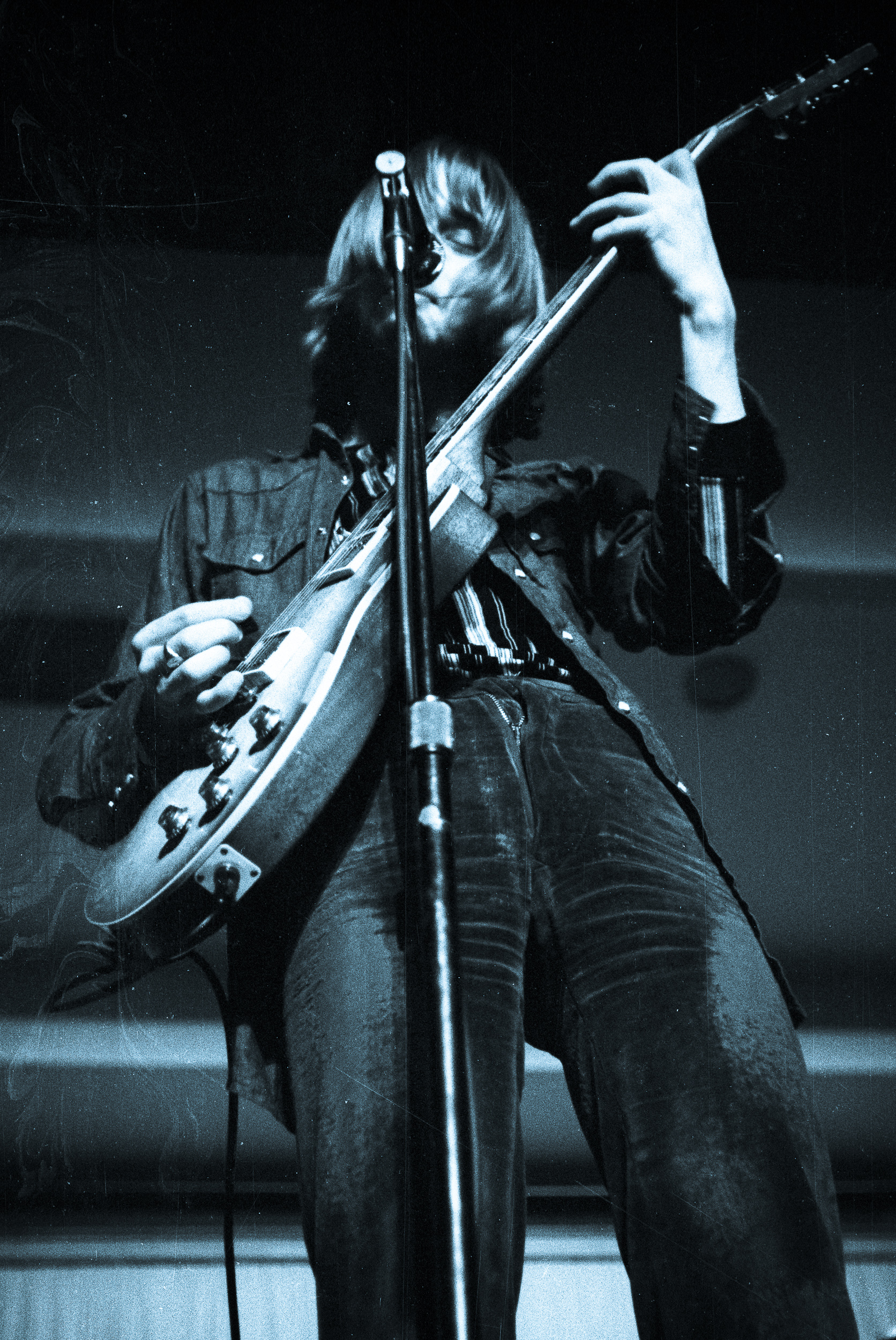
- Kirwan performing with Fleetwood Mac, 18 March 1970

Background information
- Born: Daniel David Langran; 13 May 1950; Brixton, London, England
- Died: 8 June 2018 (aged 68) London, England
- Genres: Blues rock; rock; folk rock
- Occupations: Musician; songwriter
- Instruments: Guitar; vocals
- Years active: 1966–1979
- Labels: Blue Horizon; Reprise; DJM

Daniel David Kirwan (né Langran, 13 May 1950 – 8 June 2018) was a British guitarist, singer and songwriter with the blues-rock band Fleetwood Mac between 1968 and 1972. He released three albums as a solo artist from 1975 to 1979, recorded albums with Otis Spann, Chris Youlden, and Tramp, and worked with former Fleetwood Mac colleagues Jeremy Spencer and Christine McVie on some of their solo projects. He was inducted into the Rock and Roll Hall of Fame as a member of Fleetwood Mac in 1998.

== Early life, education and family ==
Kirwan was born Daniel David Langran on 13 May 1950 and raised in Brixton, South London. His parents separated when he was young. His mother, Phyllis Rose Langran, married Aloysious J. Kirwan in 1958 when Danny was eight. Kirwan left school in 1967 with six O-levels and worked for a year as an insurance clerk in Fenchurch Street in the City of London.

== Career ==
=== Musical influences and first band ===
Kirwan's mother was a singer and he grew up listening to the music of jazz musicians such as Eddie Lang, Joe Venuti, Belgian gypsy guitarist Django Reinhardt and 1930s–40s groups such as the Ink Spots. He began learning guitar at the age of 15 and rapidly became an accomplished musician and guitarist. He was influenced by, among others, Hank Marvin of the Shadows, Django Reinhardt, Jimi Hendrix, and particularly by Eric Clapton's playing in the Bluesbreakers. Kirwan was 17 when he came to the attention of established British blues band Fleetwood Mac in London while fronting his first band, Boilerhouse, a blues three-piece with Trevor Stevens on bass and Dave Terrey on drums. Boilerhouse played support slots for Fleetwood Mac at London venues such as the Nag's Head in Battersea and John Gee's Marquee Club in Wardour Street.

=== Joining Fleetwood Mac ===
Mick Fleetwood recalled, "We met Danny at a little club in Brixton, the Nag's Head, one night when we played with a local band called Boilerhouse. Danny played beautifully, getting a subtle tremolo effect from his fingering." Fleetwood Mac's producer Mike Vernon booked Boilerhouse to play at his blues club, the Blue Horizon in Battersea, and he remembered, "Danny was outstanding. He played with an almost scary intensity. He had a guitar style that wasn't like anyone else I'd heard in England." Kirwan became a devoted fan of Fleetwood Mac's lead guitarist, Peter Green, and followed the band around the London clubs, often turning up at gigs during the afternoon to help to carry the gear in and jam with Green after the soundcheck. "Which is how Danny Kirwan came into our lives," Fleetwood said. "Danny was a huge fan of Peter's. He would see us every chance he got, usually watching in awe from the front row."

Fleetwood Mac had been constituted as a quartet but Green, the band's founder, wanted to move away from pure blues and had been looking for a new musical collaborator and backing guitarist to work with, as slide guitarist Jeremy Spencer did not contribute to his songs. Green found that he and Kirwan worked well together, and suggested to Fleetwood that Kirwan could join Fleetwood Mac. Although the rest of the band were not entirely convinced, Fleetwood invited Kirwan to join the band in August 1968. Fleetwood said, "Danny was an exceptional guitar player. It was clear that he needed to be with better players ... In the end, we just invited him to join us. It was one of those 'ah-ha' moments when you realise the answer is right there in front of you." Kirwan's reaction was described as "astonishment and delight". His arrival expanded Fleetwood Mac to a five-piece with three guitarists.

Green described Kirwan as "a clever boy who got ideas for his guitar playing by listening to all that old-fashioned Roaring Twenties big-band stuff." Kirwan was known to be "emotionally fragile", and Green said that in the early days, Kirwan "was so into it that he cried as he played."

=== Fleetwood Mac ===
A year after forming Fleetwood Mac, Peter Green was looking for ways to extend the band and perhaps change its direction. He wanted to be open to other musical styles and bring in more of his own material. Kirwan was the ideal foil for Green's new approach: he played gentle, supportive rhythm guitar to Green and Spencer's fiery solo work and introduced vocal harmonies to some of the songs. Spencer said, "Peter and I had seen Danny play and thought he was very good. Peter and Danny worked well together."

Fleetwood said, "Danny worked out great from the start. His playing was always very melodic and tuneful, with lots of bent notes and vibrato. Danny's style of playing complemented Peter's perfectly because he was already a disciple. His sense of melody on rhythm guitar really drew Peter out, allowing him to write songs in a different style. He was full of ideas that helped to move Fleetwood Mac out of the blues and into the rock mainstream ... Playing live, he was a madman." Fleetwood Mac biographer Leah Furman said Kirwan had "provided a perfect sounding board for Peter's ideas, added stylistic texture, and moved Fleetwood Mac away from pure blues."

Kirwan was interviewed by weekly music paper Melody Maker soon after joining Fleetwood Mac and gave the first indication of the breadth of his musical influences. He told Melody Maker:

I'm not keen on blues purists who close their ears to all other forms of music. I like any good music, particularly the old big band-type things. Django Reinhardt is my favourite guitarist, but I like any music that is good, whether it is blues, popular or classical.

The band's manager Clifford Davis, himself a musician, remembered Kirwan as "a very bright boy with very high musical standards. When we were on the road he was constantly saying 'Come on, Clifford, we must rehearse, we must rehearse, we've got to rehearse'." Davis said Kirwan "was the originator of all the ideas regarding harmonies and the lovely melodies that Fleetwood Mac would eventually encompass."

==== First gigs and tours ====
Kirwan progressed from being an 18-year-old guitarist in a small pub band in south London to being a member of an internationally known touring band in one move. He played his first gig with Fleetwood Mac on 14 August 1968 at the Nag's Head Blue Horizon Club in Battersea, London. Ten days later he was with them on stage at the Hyde Park Free Concert in London, performing on the same bill as Family, Ten Years After and Fairport Convention. A session in the BBC radio studios in London followed, to record twelve songs for broadcast on John Peel's 'Top Gear'. Three days after that the band began a 50-date tour of the UK and Scandinavia, and at the end of November they were in Paris, performing in a New Year's Eve show for French television [ORTF 'Surprise Partie'] with The Who, Small Faces, Pink Floyd and The Troggs. Two days later, on 1 December 1968, Kirwan was in New York City at the start of an almost sold-out, 30-date Fleetwood Mac US tour which would include performances at major venues such as the Fillmore East in Manhattan, the Fillmore West in San Francisco, the Boston Tea Party, and an appearance before 100,000 fans at the three-day Miami Pop Festival in Florida alongside, among others, Chuck Berry, Muddy Waters, B. B. King, and the Grateful Dead. In April 1969, Kirwan played at the Royal Albert Hall in London when Fleetwood Mac supported B.B. King on the opening date of his first UK tour.They played support on the eight-date tour.

==== First recording: "Albatross" ====
Kirwan's first recorded work with Fleetwood Mac, in October 1968, was his contribution of the second guitar part to Green's blues instrumental "Albatross". Green had been working on the piece for some time, and Kirwan completed it by adding the counterpoint harmony in the middle section. Green said, "Once we got Danny in, it was plain sailing... I would never have done 'Albatross' if it wasn't for Danny. I would never have had a number one hit record." Kirwan recalled that Green had told him what to do and all the bits he had to play. The band spent two days recording and mixing the track at CBS studios in New Bond Street, London, and when they listened to the final mix, everyone agreed it was "a beautiful record". "Albatross" was released in November 1968 on Mike Vernon's Blue Horizon label. It reached number one in the UK Singles Charts in December 1968 and sold nearly a million copies.

Kirwan provided the instrumental "Jigsaw Puzzle Blues" for the B-side of "Albatross". His first published composition, this was originally a clarinet piece, written by Joe Venuti and Adrian Rollini and recorded by the Joe Venuti / Eddie Lang Blue Five in 1933. Kirwan worked it out from the record and adapted it for Green and himself to play on guitar, but Green remembered, "I couldn't do it properly, I can't play that sort of big band Prohibition-time thing," so Kirwan played all the guitar parts himself.

The Beatles admired "Albatross" and were inspired by it to create the slow, melodic, harmonised track "Sun King" on their 1969 album Abbey Road. In the spring of 1969, after Fleetwood Mac's manager had removed the band from the Blue Horizon label, John Lennon was reported to be interested in signing Fleetwood Mac to the Beatles' new Apple Records label.

==== Blues sessions at Chess ====
In early January 1969 Kirwan was on his first tour of the United States with Fleetwood Mac, and they opened for Muddy Waters at the Regal Theater in Chicago. While they were there, producer Mike Vernon heard that Chess Records was about to close its famous Chicago studio and suggested recording a Fleetwood Mac blues album in the home of Chicago blues before it disappeared. He and Marshall Chess arranged a two-day recording session in which Kirwan, along with Green, Spencer, McVie and Fleetwood, played with legendary blues musicians David "Honeyboy" Edwards, Walter 'Shakey' Horton, J.T. Brown, Willie Dixon, Otis Spann, Buddy Guy, and S.P. Leary. Willie Dixon organised the sessions.

The recordings made at Chess Studios were judged a great success, and were released by Vernon in December 1969 as a double album on the Blue Horizon label, originally entitled Blues Jam at Chess and later reissued as Fleetwood Mac in Chicago. Fleetwood said later that the sessions had produced some of the best blues the band had ever played, and ironically, the last blues that Fleetwood Mac would ever record. Two of Kirwan's songs, "Talk With You" and "Like It This Way", were included on the album.

==== Then Play On, 1969 ====
Kirwan's skills came to the forefront on the band's mid-1969 album Then Play On, recorded at Kingsway Studios in Holborn, London. Green had told Kirwan when he joined the band that he would be responsible for half of the next album, and the songwriting and lead vocals on Then Play On were split almost equally between them, with many of the performances featuring their dual-lead Gibson Les Paul guitars. Fleetwood said that Kirwan, asked to write his first songs for the band, "approached his assignment very cerebrally, much as Lindsey Buckingham would do later, and came up with some very good music." (Fleetwood said in an interview years later that Buckingham had "a huge regard for Danny".) Kirwan's input drew on material he had written in his first band.

Green took a back seat during the recording sessions and left most of the guitar work to Kirwan, who composed seven of the fourteen tracks. His "Coming Your Way" opened side one of the album. Kirwan's varied musical influences were evident throughout, from the flowing instrumental "My Dream" to the 1930s-style "When You Say", which Green had earmarked to be a single until his own composition "Oh Well" took shape and was chosen instead. "Like Crying" was a Kirwan duet with Green and Kirwan played all the guitar parts on "Although the Sun is Shining". Mike Vernon noted that Kirwan's presence and his eclectic musical influences "were already beginning to take the band out of mainstream 12-bar blues and into blues-rock and rock ballads."

The UK release of Then Play On featured two extra earlier Kirwan recordings, the sad blues "Without You" and the heavy "One Sunny Day", which was later covered by American blues musician Tinsley Ellis on his 1997 album Fire It Up.

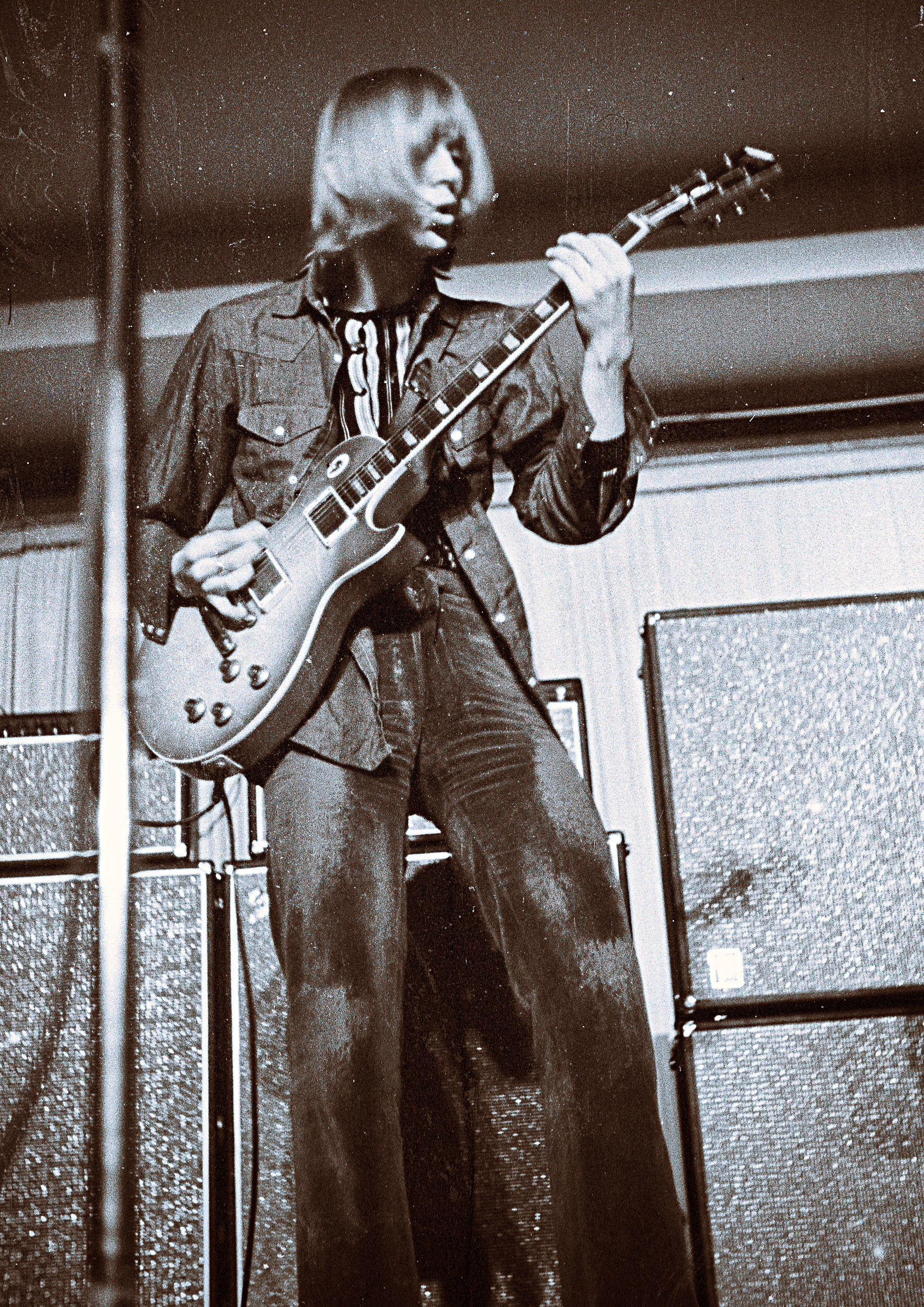
Kirwan playing at the Niedersachsenhalle, Hanover, Germany, 18 March 1970

==== US releases ====
The US-only release English Rose from the same era included Kirwan's "Without You" and "One Sunny Day", plus his blues "Something Inside of Me" and "Jigsaw Puzzle Blues", both also dating from earlier sessions. Fleetwood described the album as "a sort of pastiche" consisting of the best cuts from their second studio album, Mr Wonderful, plus "Black Magic Woman", "Albatross", and the four new tracks from Kirwan. English Rose was Fleetwood Mac's second album release in the US. Kirwan began a two-month tour with the band to promote English Rose at the Fillmore East in New York on 1 February 1969.

The US track-listing of Then Play On was reordered to allow the inclusion of the full nine-minute version of Green's hit single "Oh Well", and two of Kirwan's songs, "My Dream" and "When You Say", were dropped. Only "Coming Your Way", the wistful "Although the Sun Is Shining" and his duet with Green, "Like Crying", appeared on all the later non-UK vinyl releases. On the 1990 CD release, Kirwan's two dropped songs were reinstated, although "One Sunny Day" and "Without You" were now absent from releases in all territories, including the UK. The 2013 CD release restored the original UK track order, with "Without You" and "One Sunny Day" included.

==== Archival packages from 1968–70 ====
Archival packages from Kirwan's time with Green in Fleetwood Mac, such as The Vaudeville Years and Show-Biz Blues double sets, included several of his songs and showed other musical influences besides blues. Kirwan's unusual musical interests were said to have prompted band leader Green to dub him "Ragtime Cowboy Joe". The track listing on The Vaudeville Years contained five Kirwan songs: "Like It This Way", "Although the Sun Is Shining", "Love It Seems", "Tell Me from the Start", and "Farewell", plus a joint composition with Green, "World in Harmony". His songs on Show-Biz Blues included his first recorded song, "Mind of My Own", and a live version of "Coming Your Way". Kirwan's up-tempo blues "Like It This Way" was recorded during the "Man of the World" sessions early in 1969, and was the first Fleetwood Mac recording to feature Kirwan and Green's duelling twin-lead guitars, which became part of the band's live performances.

==== Singles 1968–1970 ====
Fleetwood Mac's hit singles from 1968 to 1970 were all written by Green but Kirwan's style shone through, thanks to Green's desire not to act as the band's musical focus. Kirwan joined Green in the dual guitar harmonies on "Albatross", contributed to "Man of the World" and took the solo on "Oh Well Pt. 1". Mike Vernon recalled "considerable input" from Kirwan in the making of "Man of the World", which was released in April 1969 and reached number two in the UK charts.

The final hit single from this line-up, "The Green Manalishi", was recorded in the US in April 1970 in a difficult night-time session after Green had announced that he was leaving the band. Producer Martin Birch recalled Green growing increasingly frustrated because he could not get the sound he wanted, and Kirwan reassuring him that they would stay there all night until they got it right. Green said later that although it had left him exhausted, making "Green Manalishi" was one of his best musical memories. "Lots of drums, bass guitars ... Danny Kirwan and me playing those shrieking guitars together ... I thought it would make number one." The track was recorded at Warner-Reprise's studios in Hollywood on the band's third US tour. "The Green Manalishi" was released in May 1970 and reached number 10 in the UK charts. It was the band's fourth consecutive hit single, and Fleetwood Mac's last in the UK for six years.

The B-side of "The Green Manalishi" was the instrumental "World in Harmony", the only track given a "Kirwan/Green" joint songwriting credit. In March 1970, Green said that he and Kirwan were planning an album based around their two guitars, and Spencer recalled later that Kirwan and Green had begun to piece their guitar parts together "almost like orchestrally layered guitar work." Kirwan and Green had already worked on melodic twin guitar demos that had sparked rumours in the music press in late 1969 of a "duelling guitars" project, but ultimately nothing came of it.

==== Kirwan and Green ====
Despite the closeness of their musical partnership, Kirwan and Green did not always get on well personally, which was at least partly due to Kirwan's short temper. Kirwan had high musical standards and concentrated more on rehearsing than the other members of the band, and Green recalled that Kirwan always had to arrive anywhere an hour early. One of the band's roadies, Dennis Keane, recalled that Kirwan had begun to clash with Green. He suggested that the success of "Albatross" and the follow-up single "Man of the World" may have gone to his head and made him more confident, to the point of trying to pressure Green and compete with him. Producer Martin Birch, however, remembered that Kirwan often sought reassurance from Green, and seemed to be in awe of him. "I often got the impression that Danny was looking for Peter's approval, whereas Peter wanted Danny to develop by himself."

==== Departure of Peter Green ====
After rumours in the music press in early 1970 that Kirwan would leave Fleetwood Mac, it was Green who departed, in May of that year. Kirwan said later that he was not surprised. "We just didn't get on too well basically ... We played some good stuff together, we played well together, but we didn't get on." Brunning said in his 1998 history of the band that Green left because of personality clashes with Kirwan and musical and personal differences with the other band members. He said Green wanted to be free to play with other musicians and not be tied down to a particular musical format. Green said, among other things, that he was exhausted from endless touring.

=== Sessions away from Fleetwood Mac ===
==== Otis Spann, Spencer, McVie ====
In January 1969, Kirwan made his first musical appearance outside Fleetwood Mac when he contributed to Otis Spann's blues album The Biggest Thing Since Colossus with Green and John McVie. After Then Play On had been completed, Kirwan worked on Christine McVie's first solo album, titled Christine Perfect (McVie was still using her maiden name). She included a version of Kirwan's "When You Say" on the album, which was chosen as a single. Kirwan arranged the string section and acted as producer.

Kirwan worked with Fleetwood and John McVie on the first solo album from a then-current member of Fleetwood Mac when Spencer recorded his album Jeremy Spencer, released in January 1970. Kirwan played rhythm guitar in various styles and sang backing vocals throughout. The album was not commercially successful, but Spencer discovered that he and Kirwan worked well together without Green. He said later, "In retrospect, one of the most enjoyable things was working with Danny on it, as it brought out a side of him I hadn't seen."

==== Blues band Tramp ====
In 1969, Kirwan contributed as a session guitarist to the first album by London-based blues band Tramp, titled Tramp, which was recorded at DeLane Lea Studios in Soho. The album featured an uptempo guitar instrumental, "Hard Work", from Kirwan. Mick Fleetwood played drums on the recording.

Tramp's bass player Bob Brunning, Fleetwood Mac's first bassist, said he had enjoyed working with Kirwan during the Tramp sessions and remembered him being friendly and cooperative. In his 1998 history of the band, Brunning described Kirwan as "a talented and soulful musician" who had contributed much fine work to Fleetwood Mac's repertoire. He recalled that when his bass amplifier was stolen in 1969, Kirwan had given him a vintage Marshall amp as a replacement.

=== Kiln House, 1970 ===
==== Arrival of Christine McVie ====
After Green left in May 1970, the band considered splitting up. Kirwan and Spencer were now having to front the band and their morale was low. Fleetwood said Spencer was terrified of being a front man on his own, "and the pressure on Danny's sensitive temperament was tremendous." He recalled, "There was one terrible night when everybody decided they wanted to leave ... but one by one, I talked them all back in." The band continued briefly as a four-piece, and was augmented after the recording of Kiln House by the arrival of keyboard player Christine McVie, described by Fleetwood as "the best blueswoman in England", as a fifth band member. The new line-up allowed Kirwan to develop more melodic rock.

==== Kirwan compositions ====
Kirwan and Spencer handled the guitars and vocals together on the band's next album, Kiln House, released in September 1970, and continued the working relationship they had developed while recording Spencer's solo album the previous year. Kirwan's songs on Kiln House included "Station Man", co-written with Spencer and John McVie, which became a live staple into the post-1974 Buckingham-Nicks era.

His other songs on the album were "Jewel Eyed Judy", dedicated to Judy Wong, a friend of the band from San Francisco, "Tell Me All the Things You Do"; and "Earl Gray", an atmospheric instrumental that Kirwan had largely composed while Green was still in the band. Kirwan sang distinctive backing vocals on some of Spencer's numbers, such as the 1950s-flavoured opening track "This Is the Rock".

Other Kirwan compositions from the second half of 1970, such as those which eventually surfaced in the 2003 Madison Blues CD box set, included "Down at the Crown". The lyrics referred to a pub near the band's communal house, 'Benifold', in Headley, Hampshire. The unsuccessful single "Dragonfly", recorded late in the year, was written by Kirwan and included lyrics adapted from a poem by W. H. Davies. This was not the last time Kirwan used a poem as lyrics for a song, and may have been a solution to occasional lack of inspiration. The B-side of the single, "The Purple Dancer", written by Kirwan, Fleetwood, and John McVie, featured Kirwan and Spencer duetting on lead vocals.

==== Return of Peter Green ====
On a US tour in early 1971, Jeremy Spencer abruptly left the band to join the Children of God. The band had another six weeks of contracted gigs that could not be performed with only one guitarist, and they would face financial ruin if they cancelled the tour. In desperation, manager Clifford Davis phoned Peter Green in England and asked if he would temporarily rejoin the band to save them from disaster. Green agreed, on condition that each show was to consist mostly of improvisation and free-form jamming.

Once the band got into their stride, Kirwan is reported to have felt annoyed and overshadowed because Green was taking a leading role in their guitar playing. After one show at which Fleetwood Mac were the headliners, he is said to have thrown a bottle of beer over Green in the dressing room. Green's biographer Martin Celmins said Green had not been trying to put Kirwan down. "[Peter] just played around him, trying to egg him on, but Danny didn't have the fire or the skills of improvisation, so he got very frustrated."

The final concert of the tour was in New York on Saturday 27 March 1971, the second of two nights at the Rock Pile on Long Island. Until then Green had kept a relatively low profile, but in his last ever performance with Fleetwood Mac, he and Kirwan and the band "took the place by storm" with a four-hour improvised version of "Black Magic Woman". Promoter Bill Graham almost started a riot when he tried to end the show at midnight and Green finally ran out of ideas at 4am.

=== Bob Welch ===
==== Welch and Kirwan ====
American guitarist Bob Welch was recruited to replace Spencer in April 1971. He arrived in London from Paris, where he had been stranded after his previous band fell apart. Fleetwood said later, "We tried a few others, but Bob was the perfect fit. We loved his personality. His musical roots were in R&B instead of blues [and] we thought it would be an interesting blend. He had a precise sense of phrasing and timing and he was well-trained, as opposed to us, who had just wandered into it."

Welch remembered Kirwan's lead guitar style as mature and economical.

"Danny was a very meticulous guitar player. The notes had to be exactly right. He didn't play any twiddly licks just to fill time. Danny's style, which he modelled after Pete Green's, was a 'make every note count emotionally' style. No wasted notes, no flash fooling around just to impress. This was actually a very mature style to have at [that] young age ... I learned a lot from Danny about economy of notes, and really trying to say something in a guitar lead."

Welch's contrasting attitudes towards Kirwan – on one hand, a difficult personal relationship, and on the other his great respect for Kirwan's musicianship – were a point of focus during the sixteen months they were together in Fleetwood Mac. Fleetwood remembered that they were "very different as people and as musicians". A personality clash developed and by 1972, under the strain of touring, Kirwan was arguing with Welch and "picking fights".

Welch commented later, "Danny was a brilliant musician [but he] wasn't a very lighthearted person, to say the least. He probably shouldn't have been drinking as much as he did, even at his young age. He was always very intense about his work, as I was, but he didn't seem to ever be able to distance himself from it and laugh about it. Danny was the definition of 'deadly serious'."

Welch recalled, "I thought he was a nice kid, but a little bit paranoid, a little bit disturbed. He would always take things I said wrongly. He would take offence at things for no reason ... I thought it was just me, but as I got to know the rest of the band, they'd say 'Oh yes, Danny, a little... strange'." Welch also suspected that Kirwan did not appreciate his musical style. "I think Danny thought I was too clever a player ... too jazzy, too many weird notes. I don't feel he loved my stuff to death."

In a Penguin Q&A session in 1999, Welch said, "Danny Kirwan was a very innovative and exciting player, singer, and writer. He was a very intuitive musician ... he played with surprising maturity and soulfulness. I always loved Danny's playing in Fleetwood Mac and on his solo work. His Second Chapter is one of the sweetest albums I have."

"He was a talented, gifted musician, almost equal to Pete Green in his beautiful guitar playing and faultless string bends. The sessions with him in the band were always intense, in a fun way. As a musician, he was developed way beyond his years and he had a sensitivity to match. Danny was definitely in tune with 'other worlds'. When he left, Fleetwood Mac lost a certain lyricism that they wouldn't get back until Stevie Nicks."

==== Future Games, 1971 ====
On the last two Fleetwood Mac albums that featured Kirwan, his songs occupied about half of each album. His guitar work was also evident on songs written by Welch and Christine McVie as they developed their own songwriting techniques. Future Games was released in September 1971. Welch brought a couple of new songs, notably the lengthy title track, which featured Welch and Kirwan playing long instrumental sections. Welch recalled later, "I mostly did the rhythm guitar parts. Danny and I worked together pretty well." Kirwan contributed the album's opening track, "Woman of 1000 Years", which one reviewer said "floated on a languid sea of echo-laden acoustic and electric guitars". His other songs were the melodic "Sands of Time", which Warner Bros. Records chose as a single in the US, and the country-flavoured "Sometimes", which suggested the route he would later take during his solo career. McVie later described Kirwan's "Woman of 1000 Years" and "Sands of Time" as "killer songs". Welch said "Woman of 1000 Years" was "Danny at his best".

==== Bare Trees 1972 ====
In 1971 Kirwan began an 11-month tour of America and Europe with the band. They opened a couple of dozen shows for Deep Purple and for several months played second on the bill to Savoy Brown. In a rare week off, early in 1972, they returned to London and recorded their next album, Bare Trees, in a few days. The pressure and strain of life on the road, of constant travelling and performing, increasingly affected Kirwan, and as the tour progressed he became withdrawn and isolated from the rest of the band, got into arguments with Welch and was drinking heavily to the point where, Fleetwood said, "alcoholism began to take hold."

Bare Trees was recorded at DeLane Lea Studios in London and released in March 1972. The album contained five new Kirwan tracks, including another instrumental, "Sunny Side of Heaven". The lyric for the album-closer, "Dust", was taken from a poem about death by British war poet Rupert Brooke, although Brooke was not credited. "Danny's Chant" featured heavy use of the wah-wah guitar effect and was essentially an instrumental piece, except for Kirwan's wordless, rhythmic scat vocals.

"Bare Trees" and "Child of Mine", which touched upon the absence of Kirwan's father during his childhood, opened each side of the LP, and under Welch's influence showed funk and slight jazz leanings. An unissued Kirwan track, "Trinity", was played live for a period during 1971–1972 and the studio version was eventually released on the 1992 box set 25 Years – The Chain. Welch commented later, "There was no overall plan to make Bare Trees sound bleak, it just happened. I think a lot of that mood comes from Danny's angst in his writing. His songs always had a kind of loneliness and forlornness about them."

Rolling Stone published a review of Bare Trees in the issue dated 8 June 1972. Reviewer Bud Scoppa said how much he had liked the previous albums, Kiln House and Future Games. He found Bare Trees "more introspective", but harder-hitting and he said, "As before, it's Danny Kirwan who makes the difference." He likened "the kind of music the new Mac plays" to "the moody rock of the middle-period Beatles" and commented on the resemblance of Kirwan's style, with his "deft melodic touch", to Paul McCartney's. He noted that after Spencer had left the band, Kirwan had become "the sole focal figure". He said Kirwan's "Jewel-Eyed Judy", "Tell Me All the Things You Do", and "Station Man" were "among the best examples of the soft-hard rock song, with their silky vocals and smoking guitars." Scoppa ended the review by saying:

"With his multiple skills, Kirwan can't help being the focal point. It is his presence that makes Fleetwood Mac something more than another competent rock group. He gives them a distinctiveness, a sting. He makes you want to hear these songs again."

=== Firing from Fleetwood Mac ===
==== Pressure and stress ====
By the summer of 1972 Kirwan had been writing, recording, touring, and performing continuously for nearly four years, since the age of 18, as a member of a major international band. He had shouldered much of the songwriting responsibility during the band's recent troubled and uncertain period and through changes in line-up and musical style. He had also found himself pushed into the spotlight as lead guitarist and front man to replace Peter Green. The pressure eventually affected his health; he developed serious problems with alcoholism, and stories were told of him not eating for days at a time and living mostly on beer.

The pressure and stress of life as a professional musician, with constant travelling and performing and exhausting schedules, particularly affected him. As the band's 1972 tour progressed he became increasingly hostile and withdrawn and was drinking heavily. Fleetwood remembered, "On that long tour in 1972 Danny became quite volatile ... He just got more and more intense. He wouldn't talk to anyone. He was going inside himself, which we put down to an emotional problem that we had no idea about. We thought he was just being awkward. I had no idea he was struggling at that level." He said,

"Danny had been a nervous and sensitive lad from the start. He was never really suited to the rigours of the business. Touring is hard and the routine wears us all down ... Our manager kept us touring non-stop and we were being stretched to our limits ... and the pressure was obviously taking its toll. He simply withdrew into his own world."

==== Backstage incident ====
Kirwan became estranged from the other members of the band and things came to a head in August. Backstage before a concert on the 1972 US tour to promote Bare Trees, he argued with Welch over tuning their guitars and suddenly flew into a violent rage, banging his head and fists against the wall. He smashed his Gibson Les Paul guitar, trashed the dressing room and refused to go on stage. Kirwan watched from the mixing desk as the rest of the band struggled through the gig without him, with Welch trying to cover Kirwan's lead parts, and offered unwelcome criticism afterwards.

Other members of the band recalled the incident. Welch: "We had a university gig somewhere. Danny started to throw this major fit in the dressing room. He had a beautiful guitar ... [a vintage Les Paul Black Beauty.] First he started banging the wall with his fists, then he threw his guitar at the mirror, which shattered, raining glass everywhere. He was pissed [intoxicated with alcohol] out of his brain, which he was for most of the time. We couldn't reason with him."

Fleetwood: "We all felt a blow-up was brewing, but we didn't expect what happened. We were sitting backstage waiting to go on. Danny was being odd about tuning his guitar. He went off on a rant about Bob never being in tune ... He got up suddenly ... and bashed his head into the wall, splattering blood everywhere. I'd never seen him do anything that violent in all the years I'd known him. The rest of us were paralysed, in complete shock. He grabbed his precious Les Paul guitar and smashed it to bits. Then he set about demolishing everything in the dressing room as we all sat and watched. When there was nothing left to throw at the wall or overturn, he calmed down. Five minutes to showtime and there was blood everywhere. Danny said 'I'm not going on'. We were already late to the stage and we could hear the crowd chanting for us. We had to go on stage without him."

Welch remembered, "I was extremely pissed off and the set seemed to drag on for ever. To do a whole set without Danny was tough, because all the band arrangements depended on him being there for a guitar part or a vocal part or whatever. I think we told the audience Danny was sick, which I guess he was, in a way."

==== Sacking from the band ====
After a conference between the other band members back at the hotel, Kirwan was sacked. Fleetwood, who had been the only member of the band still speaking to him, said later,

"In essence, he had a breakdown. ... The rest of us were so hurt and insulted by what Danny had done we didn't know what to do. I was loath to fire him because he played so well ... [Firing him] would mean pulling out of two weeks of gigs and cancelling the tour... [but] there was no other option. Danny had to go."

Fleetwood said in 1976, "It was a torment for him, really, to be up there [on stage], and it reduced him to someone who you just looked at and thought 'My God'. It was more a thing of, although he was asked to leave, the way I was looking at it was, I hoped it was almost putting him out of his agony," adding later, "I don't think he's ever forgiven me."

Welch said that until then the band had remained loyal to Kirwan, even when he became impossible to work with. "I would say, 'the guy doesn't show up to rehearsals, he's embarrassing, he's paranoid, we've spent five hours dealing with him', but Mick, John, and Christine remained loyal to him because he was Peter's protégé."

Kirwan's reaction after being sacked was initially one of surprise, and it seemed he had little idea of how alienated from the other band members he had become. Shortly afterwards, he met his replacement, Bob Weston, in a musicians' bar in London. Weston described the meeting: "He was aware that I was taking over and rather sarcastically wished me the best of luck – then paused and added, 'You're gonna need it.' I read between the lines that he was pretty angry with the band."

Fleetwood justified the decision to fire Kirwan as a way to put him out of his misery. In 1993, Kirwan looked back at his time with the band and his departure from it without any resentment. He said,

"I couldn't handle it all mentally. I had to get out ... I was lucky to have played for the band at all. I just started off following them around, but I could play the guitar a bit and Mick felt sorry for me and put me in. I did it for about four years, but I couldn't handle the lifestyle and the women and the travelling."

=== Solo career and beyond ===
==== Hungry Fighter, 1974 ====
In early 1974, Kirwan and another recently departed member of Fleetwood Mac, singer/guitarist Dave Walker, joined forces with keyboard player Paul Raymond, bassist Andy Silvester and drummer Mac Poole to form a short-lived band called Hungry Fighter. This group played only one gig, at the University of Surrey in Guildford, England, which was not recorded. Walker remembered, "Danny was an incredible talent ... At this time [his] guitar playing was still superb, but he was becoming increasingly withdrawn."

Walker said the band had not functioned properly because "perhaps we were not focused enough musically, and in addition, Danny Kirwan's problems were just starting, and this made communication extremely difficult." Kirwan's alcoholism had been a factor, "although in fairness to Danny the rest of the band drank a fair bit themselves", and while some interesting stuff was going on, the focus of the project left a bit to be desired. He said later, "Danny Kirwan, bless him, had already started his downward spiral, and it was so painful and sad to watch that I think it permeated the band's optimism and vision."

Walker had previously been a member of UK band the Idle Race, which opened a show for Fleetwood Mac at the Lyceum Theatre in London in 1970. In a Penguin Q&A session in 2000, he recalled Kirwan's guitar playing being "very classy". He commented,

"Fleetwood Mac's original line-up [Green, Spencer, Kirwan, Fleetwood, McVie] were the most impressive group I had had the privilege of sharing a stage with since the Beatles."

==== Other sessions: Chris Youlden, Tramp ====
After leaving Fleetwood Mac, Kirwan worked with Chris Youlden of Savoy Brown on his 1973 solo album Nowhere Road. In 1974, Kirwan worked again with Mick Fleetwood at Southern Music Studio in Denmark Street, London, in recording sessions for the second album of London-based blues band Tramp. Kirwan played with Tramp in a 1974 BBC Radio One live broadcast to promote the album, and Tramp later performed a few live shows with Kirwan on guitar and Fleetwood as one of the drummers.

==== Solo albums, 1975–1979 ====
Guided by ex-Fleetwood Mac manager Clifford Davis, Kirwan recorded three solo albums for DJM Records between 1975 and 1979. These albums showed a gentler side of his music, as opposed to the blues guitar dynamics of his Fleetwood Mac years. The first of these, Second Chapter [1975], exhibited various musical influences, including a style close to that of Paul McCartney later in his Beatles career. Many of the songs were very simple musically, with little more than infectious melody and basic lyrics to sustain them. A Rolling Stone review of Bare Trees in 1972 commented on the similarity of Kirwan's musical style to Paul McCartney's. Kirwan said in 1997 that McCartney had been one of his early influences.

Midnight in San Juan [1976] featured a reggae-inspired cover of the Beatles' "Let It Be", which was released as a single in the US. Otherwise Kirwan tended towards simpler tunes and dispensed with the heavy production that had dominated his previous album. The lyrics were still mostly about love, but were less cheerful than before, with growing themes of loneliness and isolation, as in the closing track, "Castaway". One song, "Look Around You", was written by fellow Mac refugee Dave Walker, with whom Kirwan had worked in Hungry Fighter a couple of years previously.

Kirwan's last album, Hello There Big Boy!, recorded in London in January 1979, featured guitar contributions from his Fleetwood Mac replacement Bob Weston on two tracks, "Getting the Feeling" and "You". Weston said later, "As an experience it was difficult. Danny was barricaded in a womb of studio baffle boards much of the time. He had become totally reclusive. Danny appears to have played rhythm guitar on that album, but he couldn't handle the lead guitar work. It was evident he'd fallen totally apart."

Kirwan was not well at this time and it is not clear how much, if any, lead guitar work he contributed to the recording, although he did sing on all the tracks. Fewer of the songs were self-penned and one song, "Only You", was retrieved from his Fleetwood Mac days. Backing vocalists were used for the first time, and the musical style was much less distinct. A record company press release stated that producer Clifford Davis had added contributions from 87 musicians to the final recording. Davis later described the album as "so bad". He said, "[Kirwan] had to finish it for contractual reasons, but I had to put down the acoustic guitar parts and the vocals and everything else. I even picked the songs."

None of Kirwan's solo releases achieved commercial success, which could be attributed to his lack of public visibility and reluctance to perform live. Kirwan did not play any live gigs after a few shows with Tramp and a single performance with Hungry Fighter, all in 1974. This left all three of his solo albums unsupported by any form of extra exposure or active promotion, apart from an irregular string of equally unsuccessful singles. No singles were released in continental Europe, where he might have enjoyed some success given Peter Green's resurgence there, particularly in Germany.

== Personal life ==
=== Mental health ===
==== Fleetwood Mac period, 1968–1972 ====
Kirwan was described by those who knew him in Fleetwood Mac, between the ages of 18 and 22, as a brilliant and exceptionally talented musician, but also as nervous, sensitive and insecure. Christine McVie said in an interview in 2018, "Danny was a troubled man and a difficult person to get to know. He was a loner." John McVie recalled, "Danny was a very nice guy, nervous and shy ... he had a lot of insecurity." Fleetwood remembered Kirwan as "nervous and sensitive" and commented, sympathetically, that he had "carried all his emotional baggage around with him". Spencer said, "He was jittery and nervous ... the pressure became too much for him." A member of the band Kirwan was in briefly in 1974 recalled, "Danny had a touch of genius, but the poor fellow was a bag of nerves." Fleetwood said in 2014, "Danny was wonderful, but he couldn't handle the life."

In 1969, Peter Green described Kirwan, then aged 19, as neurotic and prone to worrying. He said, "[Danny] has done some incredible things on the new LP and we're proud to have him with us, [but] he's neurotic and worries about everything. He even worries about simple things like catching a bus. He bites his nails until they bleed. He's either right up or right down, either raving or worrying." In a Melody Maker interview in 1969 Kirwan described himself as "nervous" and "highly strung". He said, "I just can't relax."

Bob Welch worked with Kirwan in Fleetwood Mac from April 1971 to August 1972. He and Kirwan shared a productive musical partnership, but Welch, an outgoing Californian, found Kirwan to be withdrawn and difficult to communicate with. Welch recalled,

I thought he was a nice kid, but a little bit paranoid, defensive, a little bit disturbed. He would always take things I said wrongly ... He would take offence at things for no reason. He'd play something and I'd say, 'That's kinda nice' and he'd say, 'Kind of nice? You mean you don't like it?' I thought it was just me, but as I got to know the rest of the band they'd say, 'Oh yes, Danny, a little... strange'.

In Penguin Q&A sessions in 1999 and 2003, Welch said:

Danny Kirwan was a wonderful musician, and we had no problems there at all [...] He was a sort of 'moody genius' type to work with. I didn't understand Danny at all […] But he was such a sweet and charming singer and writer. The contrast couldn't have been greater between what he sounded like and what it was like to be around him.

Danny was one of the strangest people I've ever met, very nervous, hard to establish a rapport with ... [but] he was also a very intuitive musician ... he played with surprising maturity and soulfulness. There was something idealistic and pure about him.

Kirwan's mental state appears to have been fragile before he became involved with Fleetwood Mac. The band's manager, Clifford Davis, said Kirwan's mother had split from his father "and Danny was always trying to find him. He had a lot of problems with self-confidence and security ... Hurled into the Fleetwood Mac circus in his teens, he found the fame hard to cope with."

In the late 1970s Kirwan's mental health deteriorated, and after a difficult time recording his final solo album in January 1979, he played no further part in the music industry.

==== Alcohol and drugs ====
Alcohol and drugs appear to have contributed to Kirwan's decline. Green's biographer Martin Celmins said that by the age of 21, after two and a half years as a professional musician, Kirwan was "lost in a drink and drugs wasteland." A lot of pressure and responsibility had fallen on his shoulders after Green left the band in 1970 and he had found it difficult to cope. By the end of 1970 his excessive drinking was causing concern. By 1972 he was drinking heavily and showing signs of alcoholism, and he had experimented with LSD and mescaline. Celmins quoted Fleetwood's first wife, Jenny Boyd, who knew Kirwan, as saying, "I think drugs and alcohol got Danny totally nuts in the end. He was just too sensitive a soul."

==== Homelessness ====
During the 1980s and 1990s, Kirwan endured periods of homelessness in London. In 1980 Fleetwood Mac, then based in Los Angeles, were in London for a concert and Kirwan turned up at their hotel. Fleetwood recalled later, "It was heartbreaking ... he looked derelict ... he told us he'd slept on a park bench the night before." In 1989 Bob Brunning, wanting to interview Kirwan for a book, tracked him down to a hostel for the homeless in Covent Garden in London's Soho district. Brunning said Kirwan was "still slim, but puffy-cheeked and highly agitated. He couldn't talk coherently, just said, 'Can't help you Bob. Too much stress'."

In 1993, Fleetwood contacted the Missing Persons Bureau in London from Los Angeles and Kirwan, then aged 42, was traced to the hostel for the homeless where he had been for the past four years, "carrying all his worldly goods in a rucksack" and living on social security and small amounts of royalties. Interviewed by The Independent newspaper, Kirwan said, "I've been through a bit of a rough patch, but I'm not too bad. I get by. I suppose I am homeless, but then I've never really had a home since our early days on tour."

In 1994 he was described as "a homeless alcoholic, divorced, with a son he hardly ever sees." In March 1996 he was reported to be sleeping on park benches and was a semi-permanent resident of a homeless hostel. Around this time his ex-wife was quoted as saying, "[Danny] lives a very simple life and is pretty much disconnected from what you or I would call reality."

In July 2000, a few weeks after his 50th birthday, Kirwan was settled in a care home for alcoholics in south London. A journalist who had interviewed him in 1996 reported that he was now looking "fitter, stronger and more together" and kept a guitar in his room. He said, "[Danny] remains a very private person who keeps himself to himself." In 2002, Jeremy Spencer visited with Kirwan's ex-wife and son. Spencer said later that the meeting had been pleasant, although Kirwan was "in his own world". Kirwan was said to be well looked after, and was visited by family and friends.

==== Final interview ====
Music writer Martin Celmins met Kirwan at the hostel in London where he was staying and managed a brief interview, which was published in The Guitar Magazine [UK] in July 1997. Celmins said Kirwan was "mostly cheery ... and able to express his views forcefully and articulately." Celmins asked how he had come to play the blues. Kirwan said, "I was around and gathered it all up and got involved. I didn't think 'I want to be a musician'. It just kind of happened ... I got into the blues and it got into my system."

Celmins asked about big-band music and Django Reinhardt. Kirwan said, "Those were the kind of records I'd buy. I worked out 'Jigsaw Puzzle Blues' from that stuff and then played the signals to the rest of the band. John McVie knew every signal you could give out – signals to say, 'You do this' and 'You do that', and they'd do it and it would all come together. That band was so clever – they knew all the signals and could do it." Celmins asked how he had joined Fleetwood Mac. Kirwan said, "Mick Fleetwood asked me ... I didn't know what to think once I'd joined because ... then I was on stage and there were television cameras and I got a bit paranoid."

Kirwan said, "I always liked Mick Fleetwood – he was like family. I still think of them as friends. John McVie is the cleverest person. A nice bloke and highly intelligent. He was my best friend in the band at the time ... Jeremy Spencer was a bit sarcastic. And although I used to get on with John and Mick, it got very cliquey ... So I wasn't actually a part of them really. I only got mixed up with them ... [Peter and I] played some good stuff together, we played well together, but we didn't get on. I was a bit temperamental, you see."

==== Munich commune incident, 1970 ====
In a 2009 BBC documentary about Peter Green, and in Bob Brunning's 1998 history of Fleetwood Mac, the band's manager, Clifford Davis, blamed Kirwan's mental deterioration on the same incident in March 1970 that is alleged to have damaged Green's mental stability: a reaction to LSD taken at a hippie commune near Munich in the middle of a European tour. Davis said, "Peter Green and Danny Kirwan both went together to that house in Munich, both of them took acid as I understand it, [and] both of them, as of that day, became seriously mentally ill."

Other sources, however, say that Kirwan was not present at the Munich commune. Fleetwood Mac roadie Stuart 'Dinky' Dawson remembers that only two of the Fleetwood Mac contingent went to the party: Green and another roadie, Dennis Keane. Dawson states that Kirwan did not go to the commune, and that when Keane returned to the band's hotel and told them that Green would not leave the commune, neither Kirwan nor Davis went to fetch him, leaving the task to Keane, Dawson, and Mick Fleetwood.

Keane agrees with Dawson's account, except for the details that he phoned Davis from the commune and did not physically return to the hotel to fetch help, and that Davis accompanied Dawson and Fleetwood to fetch Green. Green said of the incident, "To my knowledge, only Dennis and myself out of the English lot went there." Jeremy Spencer has suggested that he was also present at the commune and arrived later with Fleetwood. Neither Keane, Dawson, Green, nor Spencer mentioned Kirwan being present at the commune.

==== LSD and mescaline ====
Kirwan appears to have taken LSD before the Munich commune incident. Fleetwood stated in his autobiography that the band took LSD together when they arrived in New York in December 1968 at the start of a US tour, a few months after Kirwan had joined the band. They opened for the Grateful Dead at the Fillmore East, and after the show they were offered "the best, most pure LSD available." Fleetwood said, "We all wanted to try it ... We all had a go." They took the LSD in a hotel room in New York, "sitting in a circle on the floor, holding hands", and later took more acid trips together as "a bonding experience."

Fleetwood remembered Kirwan and Spencer taking mescaline when the band arrived in San Francisco at the start of a US tour in February 1971. He said, "It really did a number on them.... The effects seemed to last far longer than they should have."

== Later developments ==
Kirwan was inducted into the Rock and Roll Hall of Fame in Cleveland, Ohio, in 1998 for his work as part of Fleetwood Mac. He did not attend the induction ceremony.

Peter Green said in a Penguin Q&A session in 1999 that all the [early Fleetwood Mac] musicians were receiving their share of royalties, although there had been difficulty over the years in collecting some of them. He said, "Danny Kirwan is still receiving his and is doing OK."

Kirwan's three solo albums were given a belated CD release in February 2006, but only in Japan. A limited edition of 2,500 copies of "Second Chapter" was issued by Repertoire Records in early 2008. The rights and royalties situation regarding these releases was such that it was not known whether Kirwan's estate would receive any income from them. Prior to this, only Second Chapter had been available on CD for a brief period in Germany in 1993. The rights were owned by Clifford Davis.

In the mid-2000s there were rumours of a reunion of the early line-up of Fleetwood Mac involving Green and Spencer. The two guitarists apparently remained unconvinced about a reunion, and Kirwan made no comment. In April 2006, during a question-and-answer session on the Penguin Fleetwood Mac fan website, John McVie said of the reunion idea, "If we could get Peter and Jeremy to do it, I'd probably, maybe, do it. I know Mick would do it in a flash. Unfortunately, I don't think there's much chance of Danny doing it. Bless his heart."

One of Kirwan's songs, "Tell Me All the Things You Do" from the 1970 album Kiln House, was included in the set of Fleetwood Mac's 2018–19 "An Evening with Fleetwood Mac" tour, with guitarist Neil Finn and Christine McVie sharing vocals.

== Marriage and death ==
Kirwan married Clare E. Stock in Southend district in the June quarter of 1971; they divorced a few years later. They had one son, Dominic Daniel, born in 1971.

Danny Kirwan died in London on 8 June 2018 aged 68. An obituary in The New York Times quoted his former wife as saying that he had died in his sleep after contracting pneumonia earlier in the year.

=== Tributes ===
In a statement posted on Facebook, Mick Fleetwood said, "Danny was a huge force in our early years ... Danny's true legacy will forever live on in the music he wrote and played so beautifully as a part of the foundation of Fleetwood Mac that has now endured for over fifty years. Thank you, Danny Kirwan. You will forever be missed." Fleetwood had previously said in an interview, "I cared for Danny a lot and I care for his legacy. Danny was a quantum leap ahead of us creatively. He was a hugely important part of the band."

In an interview with Mojo magazine, Christine McVie said, "Danny Kirwan was the white English blues guy. Nobody else could play like him. He was a one-off ... Danny and Peter gelled so well together. Danny had a very precise, piercing vibrato – a unique sound ... He was a perfectionist ... Listen to "Woman of 1000 Years", "Sands of Time", "Tell Me All the Things You Do" – they're killer songs. He was a fantastic musician and a fantastic writer." Jeremy Spencer said, "Danny brought inventiveness and melody to the band ... I was timid about stepping out with new ideas, but Danny was brimming with them."

Former Hungry Fighter singer/guitarist Dave Walker said in 2000 that Kirwan was "a great loss to music." Bob Welch said in 1999 that Kirwan had been "a talented and gifted musician; an innovative and exciting player, singer, and writer. As a musician, he was developed way beyond his years." Mick Fleetwood said in 1990, "Danny was an exceptional guitar player who inspired Peter Green into writing the most moving and powerful songs of his life."

== Equipment ==
- Watkins Rapier 33, 1960s British-made Fender Stratocaster-style guitar, with a chambered body: Kirwan's was red, and he used it when in Boilerhouse, and during early Fleetwood Mac performances (e.g. Hyde Park, London, free concert 1968).
- Fender Telecaster Standard Blonde, used on "Like Crying"
- 1956 Gibson Les Paul Standard, Goldtop, P-90 pickups, no pickguard, later refinished to red
- 1959 Gibson Les Paul Standard, Cherry Sunburst, no pickguard
- 1959 Gibson Les Paul Standard, Tobacco Sunburst, no pickguard
- 1957 Gibson Les Paul Custom, three-pickup Black Beauty, no pickguard
- Orange Matamp 100W valve (vacuum tube) amplifier, usually used with two 4 × 12 Orange speaker cabinets (used by the whole band for a period) and separate Orange (valve) spring reverb unit
- Fender Dual Showman amplifier

== Discography ==
=== Solo albums ===
- Second Chapter (DJM 1975)
- Midnight in San Juan (DJM 1976)
- Danny Kirwan (DJM 1977 – US release of Midnight in San Juan)
- Hello There Big Boy! (DJM 1979)
- Ram Jam City (Mooncrest 2000 – recorded in the mid-1970s as demo tracks for the Second Chapter album)
