= DJM Records =

British record label, 1969–1986

- Founded: 1969
- Defunct: 1986
- Distributor: Pye Records
- Genre: various

DJM Records (also known as Dick James Music) was a British independent record label, set up in the late 1960s by British music publisher Dick James. It was distributed by Pye Records in the UK, and various other companies around the world, including the US.

The first release on the label was "It Takes a Thief" by Dave Sealey, which had been adapted from the theme music from the television series for which a lyric was written. Frank Neilson was A&R manager from 1976 to 1979, before he moved to Polydor Records. Andy Stinton was Promotions Manager for several years before moving to Canada in 1980 to start his own communications company.

Elton John was prominent on DJM, except in the United States and Canada where his records were issued on the MCA Records label. In 1976, he began his own label, The Rocket Record Company. He brought a lawsuit against DJM in the 1980s over the rights to his earlier (pre-1976) work.

Other acts on the label in the 1970s included Ireland's Celtic rockers Horslips; John Inman, Mr. Bloe, who included pianist Zack Laurence and harmonica player Harry Pitch; former Fleetwood Mac member Danny Kirwan, who recorded three albums for DJM, Second Chapter (1975), Midnight in San Juan (1976), and Hello There Big Boy! (1979); The Tremeloes, after their departure from CBS/Epic in 1974; singer and actor Dennis Waterman; and Johnny "Guitar" Watson, who had several successful singles and albums in the US.

Roger Hodgson – prior to joining Supertramp – issued a UK single on DJM under the name "Argosy". This record was also released on Congress Records (a division of Kapp Records) in the US.

DJM had a daughter label called "Weekend Records" for releases relating to the ITV contractor London Weekend Television such as T.V. themes and some releases appeared both on the DJM and "Weekend Records" labels. Notable releases include "Hi Summer" by Carl Wayne.

After Dick James' death in 1986, the DJM catalogue was acquired by PolyGram. Today, the catalogue is now owned by Polygram's successor-in-interest Universal Music Group.

== See also ==
- List of record labels
