= Man of the World (song) =

- 1969 Germany issue

Single by Fleetwood Mac
- B-side: "Somebody's Gonna Get Their Head Kicked in Tonite"
- Released: April 1969
- Recorded: January 1969
- Genre: Rock
- Length: 2:36
- Label: Immediate
- Songwriter: Peter Green
- Producer: Mike Vernon

Fleetwood Mac singles chronology
| "Albatross" (1968) | "Man of the World" (1969) | "Oh Well" (1969) |

"Man of the World" is a song recorded by Fleetwood Mac in 1969, and composed by vocalist and lead guitarist Peter Green. After the group signed to Immediate Records that year, the label collapsed shortly after the single's release. As such, "Man of the World" is the only Fleetwood Mac single under the Immediate Records label.

"Man of the World" first appeared as a Fleetwood Mac single in various countries in 1969, subsequently appearing on the band's Greatest Hits album in 1971. The song was later featured on the 1992 boxed set 25 Years – The Chain, and on the 2002 compilation albums The Very Best of Fleetwood Mac and The Best of Peter Green's Fleetwood Mac. A slightly different version of the song was included on the 1998 compilation The Vaudeville Years. In 2019, the band played the song live for the first time in 50 years during the Australian leg of their An Evening with Fleetwood Mac tour.

== Composition ==
Green wrote "Man of the World" when he was at an emotional low point, saying that "It was how I felt at the time. It's me at my saddest." He mentioned in an April 1969 interview with New Musical Express that that the origins of "Man of the World" dated back a year and a half prior when he started with the phrase "Shall I tell you about my life?". The song was then gradually pieced together, with the middle section coming at a later point. Mick Fleetwood commented on the song's lyrics in an interview with Rolling Stone. "It's a very prophetic song. When he made those songs, we had no idea that he was suffering internally as much as he was. But if you listen to the words, it's crucifyingly obvious what was going on. But a beautiful song. A poignant song."

Fleetwood Mac began the recording sessions for "Man of the World" in January 1969 during a break in the band's touring schedule. The band was in New York during their second American tour when they began work on the song. Disc magazine reported in its 1 February 1969 publication that "Man of the World" would be the follow-up single to "Albatross". They described the upcoming single as "a vocal track with flute and strings".

"Man of the World" was the final Fleetwood Mac song with Mike Vernon serving as producer. After the recording sessions in New York, Vernon returned to London with the rest of the band and resumed work on the song at Kingsway Studios in Holborn. Martin Birch served as the engineer for these sessions and finished the song without Vernon, who left before the conclusion of the recording sessions to settle some contractual issues related to the band. Vernon remembered that Danny Kirwan had "considerable input" in the creation of "Man of the World" and said that he and Green worked out guitar harmonies together.

Green told Disc magazine in an April 1969 interview that he had no intention of performing "Man of the World" live, saying that "I don't sing it on stage because I don't feel it's true of me now. It's me of the past..." In 2025, the original handwritten lyrics to "Man of the World" were sold at an auction for £24,700. Green had written the original lyrics in a blue ballpoint pen and made revisions to the lyrics with black ink, which was used to change three lines and add a new part to the final verse.

== Release ==
"Man of the World" was released in the UK on 4 April 1969. Whereas previous Fleetwood Mac singles had been issued under the Blue Horizon label, "Man of the World" was instead distributed by Immediate Records. Before the release of "Man of the World", Fleetwood Mac's one-year recording contract with Blue Horizon lapsed and Vernon had forgotten to renew it. Clifford Davis, who served as Fleetwood Mac's manager at the time, used the opportunity to secure more money for the band by negotiating a contract with a different record label.

Davis eventually settled on Immediate Records after the label offered $250,000 to sign them. He arranged a deal with Malcolm Forrester to secure the copyrights for Fleetwood Mac's songs after Green sold his publishing to Forrester a few years prior; at the time of the deal, Forrester was working for Immediate. Davis informed Vernon the next day that Fleetwood Mac was no longer signed to Blue Horizon and that the band's deal with Immediate was already in effect. Vernon contended that he would have been willing to match Immediate's offer if he was informed of the matter earlier. Davis promised Vernon that "Man of the World" would still be released under Blue Horizon since Fleetwood Mac had recorded the song when they were still under the label. The song was instead released on Immediate and the label never delivered the band the $250,000 it had promised.

On the decision to release "Man of the World" as a single, Green said that "our intention was to release what was best for the general public–what is generally known as a commercial hit. We want hits same as anybody else." He also mentioned in an interview with New Musical Express less than a month after the release of "Man of the World" that he would be disappointed if the single was commercially unsuccessful.

Sales for "Man of the World" were initially modest, so Davis engaged in payola to ensure that the song became commercially successful. Davis said "It was a big hit. I made sure of that. I spent a lot of money making sure it was played on the right programmes and you can read into that however you like. "Man of the World" peaked No. 2 on the UK Singles Chart on 7 June 1969, spending a total of 14 weeks on the listing. When discussing the single, Green expressed his belief that those who disliked "Man of the World" "were not real followers" of the band and were instead blues purists.

The song was not released in the US until 1976, when DJM Records released it as a single with "Best Girl in the World" as its B-side. "Best Girl in the World" was pulled from the non-US version of Kirwan's album Second Chapter, released in 1976. Record World said of the release that "an exquisite pattern of guitars re-establishes the early trademark." The 1976 UK re-release of "Man of the World" had the title track of Second Chapter as the B-side. The song was reissued again in February 1983 with "Somebody's Gonna Get Their Head Kicked in Tonite" as the B-side.

== Original B-side ("Somebody's Gonna Get Their Head Kicked in Tonite") ==
The B-side of the original "Man of the World" single was "Somebody's Gonna Get Their Head Kicked in Tonite", credited to Earl Vince and the Valiants – in reality Fleetwood Mac performing under a different name. The song was composed and sung by Jeremy Spencer and was one of the few songs penned by Spencer included in the band's live sets. The song was later covered by the UK punk band The Rezillos on their debut album, Can't Stand the Rezillos.

== Sampling and other uses ==
"Man of the World" was used by Ian Broudie as the basis – melody and the final lyric line – for an album track, "I Wish I Was in Love", on The Lightning Seeds' album Tilt (1999). The track is credited accordingly as co-written by Peter Green.

Green also re-recorded the song as an instrumental with the Peter Green Splinter Group, as a hidden track for their 1999 release, Destiny Road.

Midge Ure recorded a version for his album 10 in 2008.

== Personnel ==
- Peter Green – vocals, guitar
- Danny Kirwan – guitar
- John McVie – bass guitar
- Mick Fleetwood – drums
- Jeremy Spencer – vocals, guitar, piano (B-side only)

== Chart positions ==
| Chart (1969) | Peak position |
|---|---|
| Ireland (IRMA) | 5 |
| Netherlands (Single Top 100) | 12 |
| Norway (VG-lista) | 2 |
| Sweden (Sverigetopplistan) | 12 |
| UK Singles (Official Charts) | 2 |
| West Germany (GfK) | 23 |
