= Clifford Davis (music manager) =

British producer and music manager

Clifford Davis (born Clifford George Adams) is a British musician, producer and music manager, chiefly known for his controversial tenure as manager of blues rock band Fleetwood Mac from 1967 to 1974.

== Career ==
Davis's name is actually Clifford Adams. He was 'Cliff Adams' to the members of the early Fleetwood Mac circa 1967 but by 1969 had changed his surname to Davis to avoid confusion with the British vocal group The Cliff Adams Singers. He continued to use the name C. G. Adams in songwriting credits, such as those he shared with band founder Peter Green for legal or copyright reasons on the 1968 album Mr Wonderful.

Davis (as Cliff Adams) worked for Beatles manager Brian Epstein before being brought in to run the Gunnell Brothers Agency in London, which was handling all of Fleetwood Mac's work, in 1967. Peter Green came in one day shortly after Davis had arrived and said he was dissatisfied with the way the agency was promoting the band and their new single, "Black Magic Woman". Davis, having been thus introduced to Fleetwood Mac, thought the band was "stunning" and immediately did all he could to help them. Like Green, Davis was a tough East End Cockney; he liked and respected Green, and Green, impressed by his enthusiasm, asked Davis to be their manager.

=== 1967–1974: Tenure as Fleetwood Mac manager ===
Davis managed Fleetwood Mac during their first period of success in the late 1960s. The band's original leader Peter Green left in 1970 after a bout with drug use and mental illness. In February 1971, guitarist Jeremy Spencer quit the group without prior notice, causing concerts to be cancelled, and another guitarist, Danny Kirwan, was sacked in the middle of a tour in August 1972. Kirwan's replacement, Bob Weston, was fired during a tour the following year after having an affair with Mick Fleetwood's wife, after which the tour was abandoned.

Having also managed Curved Air, his tenure as Fleetwood Mac's band manager came to an end during 1974 when he started promoting a different band under the name of Fleetwood Mac, after the original band had been forced to cancel or disrupt a number of tours. Fleetwood Mac had fallen apart after an aborted tour in late 1973, leaving Davis with touring commitments to fulfill in the US, and he recruited more musicians, including ex-members of Curved Air, to tour the US as a replacement Fleetwood Mac in early 1974. He said later that he had done this with Mick Fleetwood's approval and the knowledge of other members of the band. He also claimed that he owned the group's name, which caused ill-feeling between him and the band. The members of the real Fleetwood Mac brought legal proceedings against Davis, and the subsequent court case lasted four years. The dispute was eventually settled amicably out of court, in "a reasonable settlement not unfair to either party."

=== Recording artist ===
During 1969 Davis embarked on a recording career of his own with the help of Green and Fleetwood Mac. His first single, "Before the Beginning" / "Man of the World", was a coupling of two reworked Fleetwood Mac songs written by Green. His second and final recording, "Come On Down and Follow Me" / "Homework", followed in 1970; neither single was commercially successful.

=== After Fleetwood Mac ===
Davis later managed the career of ex-Mac guitarist Danny Kirwan and produced his latter two solo albums, making use of some of the musicians who formed the fake Fleetwood Mac. He also continued to act as manager for Peter Green during the early part of his solo career. Also, during late 1975 and early 1976 Davis managed Slack Alice, a London-based 'boogie rock' band signed to Phonogram Records and put on the Vertigo label. This ended when Davis sued Phonogram over who would decide which song would be released as the band's second single. The band had not been notified that he would do this. The subsequent litigation caused the band to implode.

== General references ==
- Fleetwood Mac: Behind the Masks, Bob Brunning, Hodder & Stoughton, 1990. ISBN 978-0450531163
- My 25 Years in Fleetwood Mac, Mick Fleetwood, Hyperion, 1992. ISBN 978-1562829360
