= The Best of Peter Green's Fleetwood Mac =

Greatest hits album by Fleetwood Mac
- Released: 11 November 2002
- Recorded: 1967–1971
- Genre: Blues rock
- Labels: Columbia, Blue Horizon
- Producers: Mike Vernon, Fleetwood Mac

Professional ratings
Review scores
Source	Rating
AllMusic	4/5 stars

The Best of Peter Green's Fleetwood Mac is a compilation album by British blues rock band Fleetwood Mac released in November 2002 and focusing on the Peter Green years. The album serves as a digitally remastered replacement for the band's Greatest Hits, with the remastering and cover art taken from the 1999 box set The Complete Blue Horizon Sessions 1967–1969.

== Background ==
The album contains every single by the band released in the United Kingdom during the years 1968 to 1971, seven in total, with the exception of their joint single credited also to Otis Spann, although the band's cover of "Need Your Love So Bad" is a longer outtake rather than the UK single version. That single's b-side does appear, as does the b-side to "Oh Well (Part 1)" without the edit separating the track from its A-side. An eighth single "I'd Rather Go Blind" by the band Chicken Shack features future Fleetwood Mac member Christine McVie.

The other twelve tracks were all released on album, with nine on either the debut, Mr. Wonderful, or Then Play On. "Something Inside of Me" and "Worried Dream" are outtakes, appearing on compilations. Only two tracks do not include Green: "Dragonfly" recorded after Green left; and the Chicken Shack single. Horns and strings were added to "Need Your Love So Bad," with horns as well on "I'd Rather Go Blind"; credited musicians unknown on both. The version of "Albatross" that closes the disc is a 2002 recording by DJ Chris Coco, featuring Green.

== Critical reception ==
Reviewing the album for AllMusic, Greg Prato called the album "an exceptional document of Fleetwood Mac's early years." Music Week thought that the collection an "excellent retrospective" that demonstrated the band's music before their "radical reinvention" as a pop-rock band.

== Track listing ==
No.	Title	Writer(s)	Length
1.	"Albatross" (Blue Horizon 3145 UK #1)	Peter Green	3:08
2.	"Black Magic Woman" (Blue Horizon 3138 UK #37)	Peter Green	2:49
3.	"Need Your Love So Bad" (US version; UK edit issued as Blue Horizon 3157 UK #31)	Little Willie John, Mertis John Jr.	6:18
4.	"My Heart Beat Like a Hammer" (from Fleetwood Mac)	Jeremy Spencer	2:57
5.	"Rollin' Man" (from Mr. Wonderful)	Peter Green, C.G. Adams	2:52
6.	"The Green Manalishi (With the Two Prong Crown)" (Reprise 27007 UK #10)	Peter Green	4:30
7.	"Man of the World" (Immediate IM080 UK #2)	Peter Green	2:46
8.	"Something Inside of Me" (from English Rose)	Danny Kirwan	3:54
9.	"Looking for Somebody" (from Fleetwood Mac)	Peter Green	2:50
10.	"Oh Well (Parts 1 & 2)" (Reprise 27000 UK #2)	Peter Green	9:03
11.	"Rattlesnake Shake" (from Then Play On)	Peter Green	3:29
12.	"Merry Go Round" (from Fleetwood Mac)	Peter Green	4:05
13.	"I Loved Another Woman" (from Fleetwood Mac)	Peter Green	2:55
14.	"Need Your Love Tonight" (from Mr. Wonderful)	Jeremy Spencer	3:26
15.	"Worried Dream" (from The Original Fleetwood Mac)	B.B. King	5:22
16.	"Dragonfly" (Reprise 27010)	Danny Kirwan, W. H. Davies	2:42
17.	"Stop Messin' Round" (Blue Horizon 3157b)	Peter Green, C.G. Adams	2:19
18.	"Shake Your Moneymaker" (from Fleetwood Mac)	Elmore James	2:54
19.	"I'd Rather Go Blind" (Blue Horizon 3160 UK #14)	Etta James, Ellington Jordan, Billy Foster	3:12
20.	"Albatross" (Chris Coco featuring Peter Green)	Peter Green	5:25

== Personnel ==
- Peter Green — lead vocals all tracks except as below; guitars all tracks except "Looking for Somebody," "Dragonfly," and "I'd Rather Go Blind"; harmonica on "Looking for Somebody"; dobro, cello, timpani, clash cymbals, additional recorder on "Oh Well"
- Jeremy Spencer — slide guitar, lead vocals on "My Heart Beat Like a Hammer," "Need Your Love Tonight," and "Shake Your Moneymaker"; slide guitar on "Black Magic Woman"; piano on "Oh Well Part 2"
- Danny Kirwan — guitars on "Albatross," "The Green Manalishi," "Man of the World," "Something Inside of Me," "Oh Well Part 1," "Rattlesnake Shake," and "Dragonfly"; lead vocals on "Something Inside of Me" and "Dragonfly"
- John McVie — bass
- Mick Fleetwood — drums
- Christine McVie — piano on "Rollin' Man," "Need Your Love Tonight," "Worried Dream," and "Stop Messin' Around"; organ on "Need Your Love So Bad" and "I'd Rather Go Blind"; lead vocals on "I'd Rather Go Blind"
- Stan Webb, Andy Silvester, Dave Bidwell — instrumentation on "I'd Rather Go Blind"
- Johnny Almond, Steve Gregory, Dave Howard, Roland Vaughan — saxophones on "Rollin' Man" and "Stop Messin' Around"
- Sandra Elsdon — recorder on "Oh Well Part 2"

== Charts ==
Chart (2005)	Peak position
Scottish Albums (Official Charts)	65
UK Jazz & Blues Albums (Official Charts)	1

== Certifications ==
Region	Certification	Certified units/sales
United Kingdom (BPI)	Gold	100,000^{^}
^{^} Shipments figures based on certification alone.
