= The Essential Fleetwood Mac =

Compilation album by Fleetwood Mac
- Released: 2007
- Recorded: 1967–1968
- Genres: Blues, rock, pop
- Length: 1:49:16
- Labels: Columbia, Sony BMG
- Producer: Mike Vernon

Fleetwood Mac chronology
Fleetwood Mac: Live in Boston (2004)	The Essential Fleetwood Mac (2007)	Extended Play (2013)

Professional ratings
Review scores
Source	Rating
AllMusic	4/5 stars

The Essential Fleetwood Mac is a 2007 compilation of recordings from British blues rock band Fleetwood Mac's early recordings made with Blue Horizon Records. It includes most of the tracks from their first two albums Fleetwood Mac and Mr. Wonderful, plus non-album singles and a few rarities. The album is part of the Sony BMG series The Essential.

== Track listing ==
CD 1

1. "Black Magic Woman" – 2:54
2. "Albatross" – 3:12
3. "Long Grey Mare" – 2:16
4. "No Place to Go" – 3:22
5. "Merry-Go-Round" – 4:09
6. "Watch Out" – 4:15
7. "My Baby's Good to Me" – 2:52
8. "Looking for Somebody" – 2:52
9. "Coming Home" – 2:38
10. "World's in a Tangle" – 5:04
11. "If You Be My Baby" – 3:54
12. "Worried Dream" – 5:24
13. "Trying So Hard to Forget" – 4:48
14. "Need Your Love Tonight" – 3:29
15. "I Loved Another Woman" – 2:57
16. "Love That Burns" – 5:01

CD 2

1. "Dust My Broom" – 2:54
2. "Rollin' Man" – 2:54
3. "Lazy Poker Blues" – 2:37
4. "I Believe My Time Ain't Long" – 2:57
5. "Shake Your Moneymaker" – 2:57
6. "Cold Black Night" – 3:17
7. "Got to Move" – 3:21
8. "Stop Messin' Round" – 2:22
9. "Rockin' Boogie" – 3:49
10. "Talk with You" – 3:26
11. "Doctor Brown" – 3:46
12. "Jigsaw Puzzle Blues" – 1:36
13. "Like Crying" – 2:31
14. "The World Keep on Turning" – 2:30
15. "My Heart Beat Like a Hammer" – 2:59
16. "Need Your Love So Bad" – 6:13

== Release history ==
Country	Date	Label	Format	Catalog
Europe	2007	Columbia, Sony BMG Music Entertainment	CD, Music download	88697105392
