= Black Magic Woman (album) =

Compilation album by Fleetwood Mac
- Released: 1971
- Recorded: 1967–69
- Genre: Blues rock
- Label: Epic
- Producer: Mike Vernon

Fleetwood Mac compilations chronology
The Pious Bird of Good Omen (1969)	Black Magic Woman (1971)	The Original Fleetwood Mac (1971)

Black Magic Woman is a compilation album by British blues rock band Fleetwood Mac, released in 1971. It is a double album, composed of songs from two Peter Green-era albums, Peter Green's Fleetwood Mac (in its entirety, making up the first LP of the two) and English Rose. The U.S. Epic double album contains a different cover photo of a gypsy woman.

Professional ratings
Review scores
Source	Rating
AllMusic	4.5/5 stars

== Track listing ==
Disc 1 (Fleetwood Mac)
No.	Title	Length
1.	"My Heart Beat Like a Hammer" (Jeremy Spencer)
2.	"Merry-Go-Round" (Peter Green)
3.	"Long Grey Mare" (Peter Green)
4.	"Hellhound on My Trail" (Robert Johnson)
5.	"Shake Your Moneymaker" (Elmore James)
6.	"Looking for Somebody" (Peter Green)
7.	"No Place to Go" (Howlin' Wolf)
8.	"My Baby's Good to Me" (Jeremy Spencer)
9.	"I Loved Another Woman" (Peter Green)
10.	"Cold Black Night" (Jeremy Spencer)
11.	"The World Keep on Turning" (Peter Green)
12.	"Got to Move" (Elmore James, Marshall Sehorn)

Disc 2
No.	Title	Original release	Length
1.	"Stop Messin' Round" (Clifford Davis, Peter Green)	Mr. Wonderful
2.	"Jigsaw Puzzle Blues" (Danny Kirwan)	English Rose
3.	"Doctor Brown" (John Thomas Brown, Buster Brown)	Mr. Wonderful
4.	"Something Inside of Me" (Danny Kirwan)	English Rose
5.	"Evenin' Boogie" (Jeremy Spencer)	Mr. Wonderful
6.	"Love That Burns" (C.G. Adams, Peter Green)	Mr. Wonderful
7.	"Black Magic Woman" (Peter Green)	English Rose
8.	"I've Lost My Baby" (Jeremy Spencer)	Mr. Wonderful
9.	"One Sunny Day" (Danny Kirwan)	English Rose
10.	"Without You" (Danny Kirwan)	English Rose
11.	"Coming Home" (Elmore James)	Mr. Wonderful
12.	"Albatross" (Peter Green)	English Rose

== Credits ==
- Peter Green – vocals, guitar, harmonica
- Jeremy Spencer – vocals, slide guitar
- Danny Kirwan – vocals, electric guitar
- John McVie – bass guitar
- Mick Fleetwood – drums

Additional musicians

- Christine Perfect – piano (on Disc 2, tracks 1, 3, 5, 6, 8, and 11)
- Steve Gregory – alto saxophone (on Disc 2, tracks 1, 3, 5, 6, 8, and 11)
- Dave Howard – alto saxophone (on Disc 2, tracks 1, 3, 5, 6, 8, and 11)
- Johnny Almond – tenor saxophone (on Disc 2, tracks 1, 3, 5, 6, 8, and 11)
- Roland Vaughan – tenor saxophone (on Disc 2, tracks 1, 3, 5, 6, 8, and 11)

== Chart performance ==
Chart (1971)	Peak position
US Billboard 200	143
