= The Complete Blue Horizon Sessions 1967–1969 =

Box set by Fleetwood Mac
- Released: 1999
- Recorded: 1967–1969
- Genre: Blues rock
- Length: 6:43:14
- Label: Blue Horizon
- Producer: Mike Vernon

Professional ratings
Review scores
Source	Rating
AllMusic	3/5 stars

The Complete Blue Horizon Sessions 1967–1969 is a boxed set by British blues rock band Fleetwood Mac, released in 1999. It is a six-CD compilation of previously released material, plus outtakes and unreleased tracks from the band's early line-up, coming in a longbox with individually boxed CDs and a booklet of extensive notes and anecdotes, written by the record's producer Mike Vernon. It represents the entire recorded output of Fleetwood Mac while they were signed to the Blue Horizon label.

== Track listing ==
=== CD 1 – Peter Green's Fleetwood Mac ===
1. "My Heart Beat Like a Hammer" [Take 2 master with studio talk] – 3:31
2. "Merry Go Round" [Take 2 master with studio talk] – 4:19
3. "Long Grey Mare" – 2:15
4. "Hellhound on My Trail" [Take 1 complete master] – 2:04
5. "Shake Your Moneymaker" [Master with studio talk] – 3:11
6. "Looking for Somebody" – 2:50
7. "No Place to Go" – 3:20
8. "My Baby's Good to Me" – 2:50
9. "I Loved Another Woman" – 2:55
10. "Cold Black Night" – 3:15
11. "The World Keep on Turning" – 2:27
12. "Got to Move" – 3:19
13. "My Heart Beat Like a Hammer" [Take 1] – 3:42
14. "Merry Go Round" [Take 1] – 0:54
15. "I Loved Another Woman" [Takes 1–4] – 6:08
16. "I Loved Another Woman" [Take 5 (Master Remix) and 6] – 5:08
17. "Cold Black Night" [Takes 1–5, and 6 (Master Remix)] – 5:28
18. "You're So Evil" – 3:05
19. "I'm Coming Home to Stay" – 2:27

=== CD 2 – Mr. Wonderful ===
1. "Stop Messin' Round" [Take 4 master (album) remix with studio talk] – 2:34
2. "I've Lost My Baby" – 4:15
3. "Rollin' Man" – 2:52
4. "Dust My Broom" – 2:51
5. "Love That Burns" – 5:01
6. "Doctor Brown" – 3:43
7. "Need Your Love Tonight" – 3:26
8. "If You Be My Baby" – 3:52
9. "Evenin' Boogie" – 2:40
10. "Lazy Poker Blues" – 2:34
11. "Coming Home" – 2:38
12. "Trying So Hard to Forget" – 4:45
13. "Stop Messin' Round" [Takes 1–3] – 4:32
14. "Stop Messin' Round" [Take 5 master (single) remix] – 2:47
15. "I Held My Baby Last Night" – 4:26
16. "Mystery Boogie" – 2:51

=== CD 3 – The Pious Bird of Good Omen ===
1. "Need Your Love So Bad" (Version #2) [Take 4 remix] – 6:55
2. "Rambling Pony" [Master remix] – 3:32
3. "I Believe My Time Ain't Long" [Master remix with studio talk] – 3:01
4. "The Sun is Shining" – 3:10
5. "Albatross" – 3:10
6. "Black Magic Woman" – 2:46
7. "Jigsaw Puzzle Blues" – 1:33
8. "Like Crying" – 2:29
9. "Need Your Love So Bad" (Version #1) [Takes 1–3] – 11:33
10. "Need Your Love So Bad" (Version #2) [Takes 1–2] – 13:06
11. "Need Your Love So Bad" (Version #2) [Take 3] – 6:18
12. "Need Your Love So Bad" (USA Version) – 6:18

=== CD 4 – Blues Jam in Chicago — Volume One ===
1. "Watch Out" – 4:15
2. "Ooh Baby" – 4:05
3. "South Indiana" [Take 1] – 3:14
4. "South Indiana" [Take 2] – 3:47
5. "Last Night" – 4:56
6. "Red Hot Jam" [Take 1 with studio talk] – 5:55
7. "Red Hot Jam" – 6:02
8. "I'm Worried" – 3:44
9. "I Held My Baby Last Night" – 5:16
10. "Madison Blues" – 4:55
11. "I Can't Hold Out" – 4:49
12. "Bobby's Rock" – 3:59
13. "I Need Your Love" [Take 2 master with studio talk] – 4:32
14. "Horton's Boogie Woogie" [Take 1] – 3:37
15. "I Got the Blues" [Master with false start] – 4:53

=== CD 5 – Blues Jam in Chicago — Volume Two ===
1. "World's in a Tangle" – 5:25
2. "Talk with You" – 3:28
3. "Like It This Way" – 4:24
4. "Someday Soon Baby" – 7:36
5. "Hungry Country Girl" – 5:43
6. "Black Jack Blues" – 5:08
7. "Everyday I Have the Blues" – 4:55
8. "Rockin' Boogie" – 3:58
9. "My Baby's Gone" – 4:04
10. "Sugar Mama" [Take 1] – 0:49
11. "Sugar Mama" – 6:08
12. "Homework" – 3:19
13. "Honey Boy Blues" – 2:20
14. "I Need Your Love" [Take 1] – 2:15
15. "Horton's Boogie Woogie" [Take 2] – 3:40
16. "Have a Good Time" – 4:54
17. "That's Wrong" – 4:12
18. "Rock Me Baby" – 3:23

=== CD 6 – The Original Fleetwood Mac ===
1. "Drifting" – 3:31
2. "Leaving Town Blues" [Take 5 master remix] – 3:09
3. "Watch Out" [Take 2 master remix] – 4:46
4. "A Fool No More" [Takes 1–7, and 8 (master alternative mix)] – 7:59
5. "Mean Old Fireman" [Take 1 and 2 (master alternative mix)] – 4:06
6. "Can't Afford to Do It" – 2:02
7. "Fleetwood Mac" (Mono) – 3:54
8. "Worried Dream" [Take 1 master remix] – 6:55
9. "Love That Woman" [Alternative mix] – 2:32
10. "Allow Me One More Show" [Alternative Mix] – 2:58
11. "First Train Home" (Mono) – 4:05
12. "Rambling Pony #2" [Alternative Mix] – 2:53
13. "Watch Out" [Take 1] – 3:06
14. "Something Inside of Me" – 3:54
15. "Something Inside of Me" [Take 2] – 4:05
16. "Something Inside of Me" [Take 3] – 4:16
17. "One Sunny Day" [Master remix] – 3:11
18. "Without You" – 4:30
19. "Coming Your Way" [Take 6] – 2:59

== Credits ==
- Peter Green – vocals, guitar, harmonica
- Jeremy Spencer – vocals, guitar, piano
- Danny Kirwan – guitar, vocals
- John McVie – bass guitar
- Mick Fleetwood – drums, percussion
- Bob Brunning – bass guitar
- Christine Perfect – piano
- David Howard, Roland Vaughan, Steve Gregory, Johnny Almond – saxophone
- Duster Bennett – harmonica

=== Extra personnel on CDs 4–5 only ===
- Walter Horton – vocals, harmonica
- Buddy Guy – guitar
- 'Honey Boy' Edwards – vocals, guitar
- Willie Dixon – upright bass
- J. T. Brown – saxophone, vocals
- Otis Spann – vocals, piano
- S. P. Leary – drums
- Producer – Mike Vernon
- Engineer – Mike Ross
- Assistant producer CDs 4–5 – Marshall Chess
- Engineer CDs 4–5 – Stu Black
