= The Pious Bird of Good Omen =

Compilation album by Fleetwood Mac
- Released: 1 August 1969
- Recorded: September 1967, January–April & October 1968
- Genre: Blues rock
- Length: 36:00
- Label: Blue Horizon
- Producer: Mike Vernon

Fleetwood Mac chronology
Mr. Wonderful (1968)	The Pious Bird of Good Omen (1969)	Then Play On (1969)

Professional ratings
Review scores
Source	Rating
AllMusic	4.5/5 stars
Blender	5/5 stars
The New Rolling Stone Album Guide	4.5/5 stars

The Pious Bird of Good Omen is a compilation album by the British blues rock band Fleetwood Mac, released in 1969. It consists of their first four non-album UK singles and their B-sides, one track from their first album Fleetwood Mac, two tracks from their second album Mr. Wonderful, and two tracks by the blues artist Eddie Boyd with backing by members of Fleetwood Mac. These came from Boyd's album 7936 South Rhodes.

== Release ==
The album was released under the Blue Horizon, which had published all of their material up until the "Man of the World" single, which was instead issued by Immediate Records. By the time Pious Bird of Good Omen was released, the band had left Immediate Records and were searching for a new record label.

The Pious Bird of Good Omen was not released in the US. The closest US equivalent is the English Rose compilation album, released in December 1968 and sharing four songs with Pious Bird.

CBS reissued The Pious Bird of Good Omen in 1981 under the Nice Price catalogue campaign, which made several of the label's albums available to retailers at a discounted price. In 2002, the album was repackaged by Sony BMG as Greatest Hits with cover art very closely resembling the 1971 Greatest Hits album, and with "Shake Your Moneymaker" and "Love That Burns" added to the track listing.

In 2004, when Fleetwood Mac's Blue Horizon era albums were remastered, Pious Bird was reconfigured to remove tracks from the previous two Mac albums and the Boyd tracks, which were replaced by archival recordings from the 1967 and 1968 period.

== Reception ==
Reaction to The Pious Bird of Good Omen has been highly positive. It was described as "excellent" by the Rolling Stone Album Guide. Reviewing the 1981 reissue of the album, Record Business called it "a good buy for anyone who doesn't already own most of the tracks." Team Rock ranked the album on their list of the 20 Greatest Blues Albums from 1967–1970.

== Track listing ==
Side one
No.	Title	Writer(s)	Lead vocals	Length
1.	"Need Your Love So Bad" (single, 1968)	Little Willie John; Mertis John Jr.	Peter Green	3:50
2.	"Comin' Home" (from Mr. Wonderful, 1968)	Elmore James	Jeremy Spencer	2:38
3.	"Rambling Pony" (B-side to "I Believe My Time Ain't Long", 1967)	Green	Green	2:40
4.	"The Big Boat" (with Eddie Boyd) (single, 1968)	Boyd	Boyd	2:35
5.	"I Believe My Time Ain't Long" (single, 1967)	James	Spencer	2:55
6.	"The Sun Is Shining" (B-side to "Black Magic Woman", 1968)	James	Spencer	3:10

Side two
No.	Title	Writer(s)	Lead vocals	Length
1.	"Albatross" (single, 1968)	Green	instrumental	3:10
2.	"Black Magic Woman" (single, 1968)	Green	Green	2:46
3.	"Just the Blues" (with Eddie Boyd) (from 7936 South Rhodes)	Boyd	Boyd	5:35
4.	"Jigsaw Puzzle Blues" (B-side to "Albatross")	Danny Kirwan	instrumental	1:33
5.	"Looking for Somebody" (from Fleetwood Mac, 1968)	Green	Green	2:50
6.	"Stop Messin' Round" (from Mr. Wonderful)	Clifford Adams; Green	Green	2:18

=== 2004 release ===
No.	Title	Writer(s)	Length
1.	"Need Your Love So Bad – Version No. 2 (Remake)" (Take 4 – complete master version/remix*)	John; John Jr.	6:55
2.	"Rambling Pony" (Complete master version/remix*)	Green	3:32
3.	"I Believe My Time Ain't Long" (Master version with studio talk/remix*)	Elmore James	3:01
4.	"The Sun Is Shining"	James	3:10
5.	"Albatross"	Green	3:10
6.	"Black Magic Woman"	Green	2:51
7.	"Jigsaw Puzzle Blues"	Kirwan	1:33
8.	"Like Crying" (*)	Kirwan	2:29
9.	"Need Your Love So Bad – Version No. 1" (Take 1 – false start*, take 2 – incomplete* and take 3*)	John; John Jr.	11:33
10.	"Need Your Love So Bad – Version No. 2 (Remake)" (Take 1* and take 2*)	John; John Jr.	13:06
11.	"Need Your Love So Bad – Version No. 2 (Remake)" (Take 3*)	John; John Jr.	6:18
12.	"Need Your Love So Bad – USA Version" (*)	John; John Jr.	6:18

* Bonus track

== Credits ==
Fleetwood Mac

- Peter Green – vocals, guitar, harmonica
- Jeremy Spencer – vocals, slide guitar, piano
- Danny Kirwan – vocals, electric guitar (on side 2, tracks 1 and 4)
- John McVie – bass guitar
- Mick Fleetwood – drums

Additional musicians

- Eddie Boyd – vocals, piano (on side 1, track 4 and side 2, track 3)
- Christine Perfect – keyboards, piano (on side 1, track 2 and side 2, track 6)
- Steve Gregory – alto saxophone (on side 1, track 2 and side 2, track 6)
- Dave Howard – alto saxophone (on side 1, track 2 and side 2, track 6)
- Johnny Almond – tenor saxophone (on side 1, track 2 and side 2, track 6)
- Roland Vaughan – tenor saxophone (on side 1, track 2 and side 2, track 6)

Technical staff

- Mike Vernon – producer
- Mike Ross – engineer

=== 2004 release ===
Fleetwood Mac

- Peter Green – vocals (except on tracks 3, 4, 5, and 7), guitar (except on tracks 3 and 4), harmonica (on tracks 2 and 3)
- Jeremy Spencer – vocals (on tracks 3 and 4), guitar (on tracks 3 and 4), piano (on track 4)
- Danny Kirwan – vocals (on track 8), guitar (on track 5, 7, and 8)
- John McVie – bass guitar (except on track 2, 3, and 8)
- Mick Fleetwood – drums (except on track 8)
- Bob Brunning – bass guitar (on track 3)

Additional musicians

- Christine Perfect – piano (on track 9), organ (on tracks 10, and 11)
- Steve Gregory – tenor saxophone (on track 10 and 11)
- Mickey "Guitar" Baker – string arrangement (on track 1, 10, and 11)
- Terry Noonan – director of strings and horns (on tracks 1, 10, and 11)

Technical staff

- Mike Vernon – producer
- Mike Ross – engineer

== Charts ==
Chart performance for The Pious Bird of Good Omen
Chart (1969)	Peak position
UK Albums (Official Charts)	18
