= The Original Fleetwood Mac =

Compilation album by Fleetwood Mac
- Released: May 1971
- Recorded: 1967–1968
- Genre: Blues
- Length: 42:58
- Labels: Blue Horizon; CBS
- Producer: Mike Vernon

Fleetwood Mac albums chronology
Kiln House (1970)	The Original Fleetwood Mac (1971)	Future Games (1971)

Fleetwood Mac compilations chronology
Black Magic Woman (1971)	The Original Fleetwood Mac (1971)	Greatest Hits (1971)

Professional ratings
Review scores
Source	Rating
AllMusic	4/5 stars

The Original Fleetwood Mac is a compilation album by British blues rock band Fleetwood Mac, first released in May 1971. It consists of various outtakes recorded by the first incarnation of the band in 1967–68. The album was re-released in 2000 with four extra tracks, and re-released in 2004 with seven different extra tracks (and not including the four extra tracks from the 2000 re-release).

"First Train Home", "Rambling Pony No.2" and an instrumental composition titled "Fleetwood Mac" were recorded at Decca's West Hempstead studios in the summer of 1967. This collection marked the first time that "First Train Home" and "Fleetwood Mac" were released on an album. Green commented that he initiated the sessions for these three songs with the intention of releasing an extended play. He said that "when we finished the recordings, I called one of our numbers 'Fleetwood Mac' in tribute to Mick and John's participation."

The "No. 2" addendum to "Rambling Pony" was designated by Mike Vernon to denote that it was the second released version of the song. All remaining tracks on the collection were recorded at CBS Studios on New Bond Street.

One song on the album, "Leaving Town Blues", was covered by Rory Gallagher and included on a 1995 Peter Green tribute album. Green later commented that Gallagher's rendition of "Leaving Town Blues" was the only Fleetwood Mac/Peter Green solo cover that he enjoyed, saying "it's a different arrangement, but it's a really, really good one." The version of "Leaving Town Blues" included on The Original Fleetwood Mac was recorded on 11 December 1967 at CBS Studios in London, with the fifth take being used.

== Track listing ==
All songs written by Peter Green, except where noted.

1. "Drifting"
2. "Leaving Town Blues"
3. "Watch Out"
4. "A Fool No More"
5. "Mean Old Fireman" (Arthur Crudup)
6. "Can't Afford to Do It" (Homesick James)
7. "Fleetwood Mac"
8. "Worried Dream" (B.B. King)
9. "Love That Woman" (Lafayette Leake)
10. "Allow Me One More Show" (Jeremy Spencer)
11. "First Train Home"
12. "Rambling Pony No. 2"

=== Extra tracks on re-release (2000) ===
1. "Mighty Cold" (Doc Pomus, Mort Shuman)
2. "Jumping at Shadows" [live] (Duster Bennett)
3. "Somebody's Gonna Get Their Head Kicked In Tonite" (Spencer)
4. "Man of Action" (Spencer)

=== Extra tracks on re-release (2004) ===
- Recorded in October 1968 except where noted.
1. "Watch Out" – [Take 1 incomplete, previously unreleased] (November 1967)
2. "Something Inside of Me" (Danny Kirwan) – [master version was used on the USA LP English Rose]
3. "Something Inside of Me" (Kirwan) – [Take 2, previously unreleased]
4. "Something Inside of Me" (Kirwan) – [Take 3, previously unreleased]
5. "One Sunny Day" (Kirwan) – [also used on English Rose]
6. "Without You" (Kirwan) – [also used on English Rose]
7. "Coming Your Way" (Kirwan) – [Take 6, previously unreleased]

== Credits ==
- Peter Green – vocals, guitar, harmonica
- Jeremy Spencer – vocals, slide guitar
- John McVie – bass guitar
- Mick Fleetwood – drums
- Danny Kirwan – vocals, guitar on extra 2004 release tracks #2–7
- Bob Brunning – bass guitar on track 12

Additional musicians

- Christine Perfect – piano

== Charts ==
Chart performance for The Original Fleetwood Mac
Chart (2026)	Peak position
Scottish Albums (Official Charts)	86
UK Albums Sales (OCC)	71
