= Stop Messin' Round =

Song written by Peter Green

Single by Fleetwood Mac
- A-side: "Need Your Love So Bad"
- Released: Mid-1968
- Recorded: 28 April 1968
- Studio: CBS, London
- Genre: Blues rock
- Length: 2:38
- Label: Blue Horizon; Epic
- Songwriters: Peter Green; C.G. Adams
- Producer: Mike Vernon

Fleetwood Mac singles chronology
"Black Magic Woman" (1968)	"Stop Messin' Round" (1968)	"Albatross" (1968)

"Stop Messin' Round" is a song first recorded by English blues rock group Fleetwood Mac in 1968. It was written by the group's principal guitarist and singer Peter Green, with an additional credit for manager C.G. Adams. The song is an upbeat 12-bar blues shuffle and is representative of the group's early repertoire of conventional electric blues. The lyrics deal with the common blues theme of the unfaithful lover and share elements with earlier songs.

"Stop Messin' Round" was first released in mid-1968 as the B-side of "Need Your Love So Bad", which appeared on the UK singles chart. A different take of the song was later used as the opening track on Fleetwood Mac's second UK and US albums. Music writers have viewed the song favourably, with Green's guitar work singled out as a highlight. Other artists, such as Gary Moore and Aerosmith, have recorded renditions for their blues-inspired albums.

== Lyrics ==
"Stop Messin' Round" is credited to Peter Green and C.G. Adams, Fleetwood Mac's manager, who also used the name Clifford Davis. Only two of the song's 12-bar verses include vocals: the first uses the common call and response or AAB pattern, while the second includes four bars of stop-time, before concluding with the same refrain as the first:

Please stop messin' round
Messin' round all the time
Now if you don't stop messin' round
Be somebody's baby instead of mine

In 1948, Detroit blues harp player and singer Walter Mitchell recorded the similarly titled "Stop Messin' Around" for J.V.B. Records. Mitchell uses an AAB pattern, but includes a reference to a .44 caliber pistol. (Note: The .44 caliber pistol is referenced in early blues songs, such as "44 Blues" which was popularized by pianist Roosevelt Sykes in 1929.) Both songs use similar phrasing to the first eight bars of Sonny Boy Williamson I's 1945 adaptation of Robert Johnson's 1938 song "Stop Breakin' Down Blues". (Note: In 1997, the Peter Green Splinter Group recorded "Stop Breakin' Down Blues" for their tribute album The Robert Johnson Songbook.) Johnson's song uses the refrain "Stop breakin' down, please stop breakin' down".

== Recording and musical style ==
Fleetwood Mac recorded "Stop Messin' Round" at the CBS studio in London on 28 April 1968. The core group—guitarist Green, bassist John McVie, and drummer Mick Fleetwood—were augmented by pianist (also future McVie wife and full-time group member) Christine Perfect, and saxophone players Steve Gregory and Johnny Almond. (Note: As with most early Fleetwood Mac songs, Jeremy Spencer does not contribute guitar to recordings on which he does not sing.) Five takes were attempted: the first three were incomplete and the fourth yielded the master later included on the group's Mr. Wonderful album in 1968. The fifth take was used for the single release. (Note: At 2:38, the single version is 20 seconds longer than the album version and includes an extra 12 bars of guitar solo as well as the lyrics "Now baby please stop messin' round, You're messin' round with my heart".)

In order to capture a sound more typical of live performances, a public address system (PA system) was used in the recording studio. Producer Mike Vernon describes it as providing a "dirtier, gutsier sound – closer to that generated at a club performance" than a typical recording studio. Multitracking, a common studio technique, was not used: "[T]here is a full density of sound that ... is a result of having recorded the full band and guest musicians as one unit. No overdubs", he adds. In a 1999 interview, Vernon singled out "Stop Messin' Round":

The records we made [for Blue Horizon] were a fairly good representation of that kind of excitement [but] probably we never actually really captured the live performance in a studio – with the exception of "Stop Messin' Around" from the Mr. Wonderful album. (Note: Also participating in the interview, Green's response to Vernon's assertion was "Maybe".)

[Early Fleetwood Mac] zeroed in on two things—B.B. King and Elmore James—and they played the shit out of that music. They had the sound of B.B.'s [1965] Live at the Regal album down almost as good as B.B. did!

—Carlos Santana, Universal Tone (2014)

Fleetwood Mac biographer Donald Brackett describes the approach on Mr. Wonderful as "the straight goods in terms of gritty white blues within a traditional format" and the material as "pure scintillating blues, rough in form and raw in content". Critic Richie Unterberger sees it as an attempt to emulate the sound of the Sun Studio in Memphis and Chess Studios in Chicago, where many of the classic electric blues songs were recorded. However, he describes the overall album sound as "rushed, raw, and thin".

Chicken Shack co-founder and bassist Andy Silvester recalled Green as a perfectionist, who advised Fleetwood on his drum parts. At Green's request, Silvester played Fleetwood a Jimmy Reed song: "[I played Reed's] 'My Bitter Seed', which just had this amazing groove to it: the tempo was really slow and yet it shuffled along with a lot of swing ... it just flowed [but Fleetwood's drumming] already had that". (Fleetwood later remarked: "Shuffles ... I'm sick to death of fuckin' shuffles!")

The most prominent feature of "Stop Messin' Round" is Green's guitar work: only two 12-bar verses have vocals, the remaining four (album version) are devoted to Green's guitar soloing. Author Douglas J. Noble points out that Green's early blues guitar style reflects "a fluid approach to phrasing", where his notes are slightly behind or ahead of the beat. He adds "Green made great use of quarter tone bent notes", which is a feature of blues guitarists, such as B.B. King, to whom he was often compared. Noble's transcription shows a tempo of 132 beats per minute (or allegro) in the key of C, which he describes as "a straight-forward medium tempo shuffle blues". Green also uses both a C blues scale and C pentatonic major scale.

== Releases ==
In mid-1968 in the UK, Blue Horizon released the 2:38 fifth take of "Stop Messin' Around" as the B-side to "Need Your Love So Bad", which was recorded during the same sessions. The single reached number 31 on the UK Singles Chart on 23 July 1968. Epic Records issued the single in the US, but it did not reach the record charts. Subsequently, the shorter 2:18 fourth take of the song was added to Fleetwood Mac's second British album, Mr. Wonderful (1968) and their second American album, English Rose (1969).

The album version of the song usually appears on early compilations of Fleetwood Mac songs, such as The Pious Bird of Good Omen (1969), Black Magic Woman (1971), Greatest Hits (1971), and Vintage Years (1975). The anniversary band retrospective boxed set 25 Years – The Chain (1992) includes it, along with eight other Green compositions. The Mike Vernon produced The Complete Blue Horizon Sessions 1967–1969 (1999) has all five takes of the song. A live recording by the BBC from 1 September 1968, shortly after Danny Kirwan joined the group, appears on Live at the BBC (1995).

== Critical reception ==
"Stop Messin' Round" has received positive comments from music writers, with Green's guitar playing being singled out. In a song review for AllMusic, critic Matthew Greenwald noted:

The opening track from Fleetwood Mac's second album finds the band at once staying true to their authentic blues roots while expanding arrangements. Essentially a Jimmy Reed-styled blues-rocker, "Stop Messin' Around" is buttressed by an excellent, funky horn section. Some excellent solo sections from Peter Green highlight the song and show the band digging in to a more hard rock groove than the songs from their debut.

In a review of English Rose, critic Bruce Eder describes it as one of the songs "representing the stronger tracks" from Mr. Wonderful. Richie Unterberger calls it "Mr. Wonderful's one gem" among the album's more derivative tunes. In Legends of Rock Guitar: The Essential Reference of Rock's Greatest Guitarists, "Stop Messin' Round" is identified as one of six "guitar high points" in Peter Green's career.

== Renditions ==
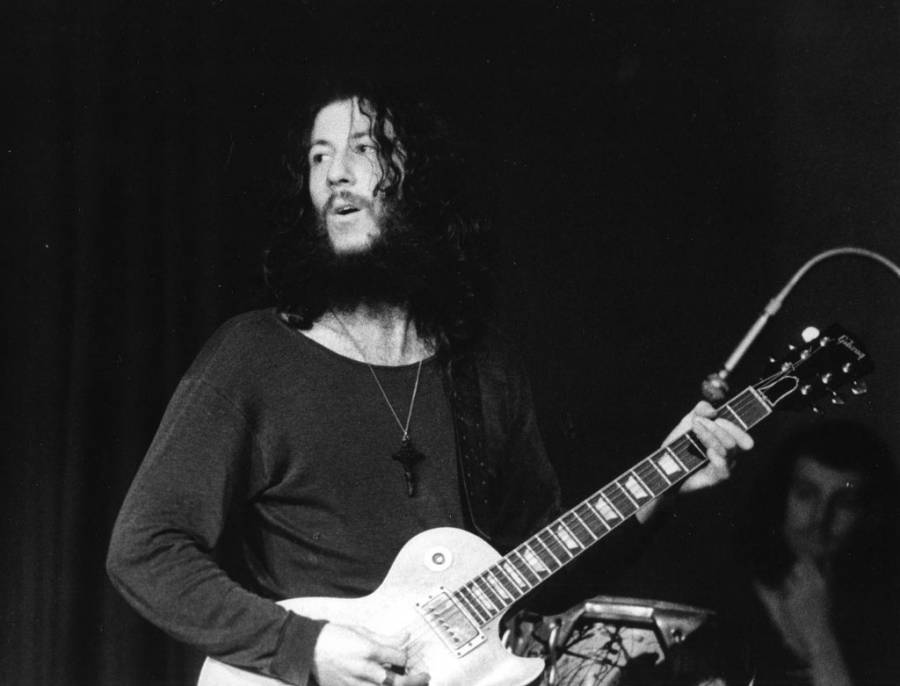
Green playing a Les Paul with a reversed neck pickup, c.1970 (Note: When asked about the extra tone control on his Les Paul, Jimmy Page replied: "I wanted to be able to reverse the phase of the pickups to get a close approximation of the sound Peter Green got.")

Northern Irish guitarist Gary Moore recorded the song for his first blues album, Still Got the Blues (1990). For a while, Moore owned Green's 1959 Gibson Les Paul, which Green frequently played with Fleetwood Mac and used to record many of the group's most well-known songs. Moore used the guitar to record his tribute album to Green, Blues for Greeny (1995), which features Fleetwood Mac-era compositions by Green. (Note: Guitarist Kirk Hammett of Metallica bought Green's original 1959 Les Paul guitar for a reported US$2 million in 2016 (about £1.6 million).)

Welsh guitarist and Savoy Brown co-founder Kim Simmonds recorded an acoustic ensemble version of the song, which appears on the tribute albums, Rattlesnake Guitar: The Music of Peter Green (1995) and Peter Green Songbook (2000). In a 1996 review for Cadence magazine, Bob Rusch describes it as "a surprisingly jazzy rendition".

American rock group Aerosmith recorded the song as "Stop Messin' Around" for their blues tribute album, Honkin' on Bobo (2004). Group guitarist Joe Perry provides the lead vocals, with Steven Tyler contributing the blues harp. Perry later explained: "[Steven]'s not a technical player ... He just lets it rip and he's great. Ripping is what we do best." The two played the song during the "Tribute to the Blues" concert at the Radio City Music Hall in New York City in February 2003. Their performance is included as a bonus track on the DVD of Lightning in a Bottle, the 2004 concert documentary film by director Antoine Fuqua.

== Bibliography ==
- Bacon, Tony (2008). Million Dollar Les Paul: In Search of the Most Valuable Guitar in the World. London: Jawbone Press. ISBN 978-1906002985.
- Bienstock, Richard (2011). Aerosmith. Voyageur Press. ISBN 978-1610597692.
- Brackett, Donald (2007). Fleetwood Mac: 40 Years of Creative Chaos. Westport, Connecticut: Praeger. ISBN 978-0-275-99338-2.
- Celmins, Martin (1998). Peter Green: Founder of Fleetwood Mac – The Authorised Biography. London: Sanctuary. ISBN 1-86074-233-5.
- LaVere, Stephen (1990). The Complete Recordings (Box set booklet). Robert Johnson. Columbia Records. C2K 46222.
- Noble, Douglas J. (1990). Instant Peter Green. Essex, England: International Music Publications. ISBN 0-86359-733-5.
- Perry, Joe (2014). Rocks: My Life In and Out of Aerosmith. New York City: Simon and Schuster. ISBN 978-1476714608.
- Prown, Pete; Newquist, Harvey P. (1997). Legends of Rock Guitar: The Essential Reference of Rock's Greatest Guitarists. Milwaukee, Wisconsin: Hal Leonard. ISBN 978-0793540426.
- Rusch, Bob (1996). "Rattlesnake Guitar". Cadence. Vol. 22, no. 7–12. ISSN 0162-6973.
- Unterberger, Richie (2016). Fleetwood Mac: The Complete Illustrated History. Minneapolis, Minnesota: MBI. ISBN 978-0760351765.
- Vernon, Mike (1999). The Complete Blue Horizon Sessions 1967–1969 (Boxed set booklet). Fleetwood Mac. New York City: Sire Records. 73003-2.
