= Vintage Years =

Compilation album by Fleetwood Mac
- Released: March 1975
- Genre: Rock
- Label: Sire

Fleetwood Mac compilations chronology
Greatest Hits (1971)	Vintage Years (1975)	Man of the World (1978)

Vintage Years is a March 1975 compilation album by British blues rock band Fleetwood Mac and was released on the Sire Records label and on CBS in the UK. The album peaked at number 67 in the U.K. and number 138 in the U.S.

== Track listing ==
Side 1

1. "Black Magic Woman"
2. "Coming Home"
3. "Rambling Pony"
4. "Something Inside of Me"
5. "Dust My Broom"
6. "The Sun Is Shining"

Side 2

1. "Albatross"
2. "Just the Blues"
3. "Evenin' Boogie"
4. "The Big Boat"
5. "Jigsaw Puzzle Blues"
6. "I've Lost My Baby"

Side 3

1. "Doctor Brown"
2. "Need Your Love So Bad"
3. "Looking for Somebody"
4. "Need Your Love Tonight"
5. "Shake Your Moneymaker"
6. "Man of the World"

Side 4

1. "Stop Messin' Round"
2. "Rollin' Man"
3. "Love That Burns"
4. "If You Be My Baby"
5. "Lazy Poker Blues"
6. "Trying So Hard to Forget"
