= Mr. Wonderful (Fleetwood Mac album) =

Studio album by Fleetwood Mac
- Released: 23 August 1968
- Recorded: April 1968
- Studios: CBS, London
- Genre: Blues rock
- Length: 41:30
- Label: Blue Horizon
- Producer: Mike Vernon

Fleetwood Mac chronology
| Fleetwood Mac (1968) | Mr. Wonderful (1968) | The Pious Bird of Good Omen (1969) |

Mr. Wonderful is the second studio album by British blues rock band Fleetwood Mac. Produced by Mike Vernon, it was recorded at CBS Studios in April 1968, where the band recorded the material live by miking their amplifiers. The material includes a mixture of blues rock originals and covers, with Peter Green and Jeremy Spencer splitting lead vocals across the album. In addition to the Fleetwood Mac's core lineup, Mr. Wonderful also features contributions from Christine Perfect (later known as Christine McVie) on piano, Duster Bennett on harmonica, and four saxophonists.

Blue Horizon released Mr. Wonderful in August 1968, with the album reaching the top 10 in the United Kingdom, Finland, and Norway later that year. The same month that Mr. Wonderful was released, Danny Kirwan joined Fleetwood Mac as their third guitarist.

In the US, Mr. Wonderful was not released, though around half of the tracks appeared on English Rose. An expanded version of Mr. Wonderful was included in the box set The Complete Blue Horizon Sessions.

== Background ==
The album was broadly similar to Fleetwood Mac's self-titled debut album, albeit with some changes to personnel and recording method. The album was recorded live in the studio with miked amplifiers and PA system, rather than plugged into the board. The vocals were distorted with a Vox amplifier and most of the album was recorded in mono.

A horn section was featured throughout the album and Christine Perfect (later Christine McVie) of Chicken Shack played keyboards. Mike Vernon, who served as the producer on the album, placed baffles and wooden partitions between the instruments to avoid audio spill.

Peter Green's material on the album was recorded on 28 April 1968, the same day that the band re-recorded their cover of "Need Your Love So Bad". One song from that session, "Stop Messin' Round", was recorded in five takes. "Rollin' Man", "Love That Burns", "If You Be My Baby", and "Lazy Poker Blues" were also recorded that same day. Green remembered that Jeremy Spencer opted not to play on his tracks on Mr Wonderful. Clifford Davis received writing credits on Green's songs under the name C.G. Adams; Green told Guitar Player magazine in a 1994 interview that Davis did so as a "tax dodge".

A second session was booked to record six tracks sung by Spencer, who granted the horn section leeway when determining what to play on his compositions, telling them to "just blow". The album took a total of four days to record. "Trying So Hard to Forget", the album's final song, was a duet between Green on guitar and Duster Bennett on harmonica.

In a June 1968 interview, Green mentioned that he would not be only singing his own songs on the band's forthcoming album. A few months later, Green told Nick Logan in an interview with NME that the album would bear a greater resemblance to their live shows than their self-titled album. He said that his harmonica playing would be less prominent on Mr. Wonderful in comparison to the band's debut album and also mentioned that several other musicians, including Perfect and Stan Webb, would appear on his songs.

On Mr Wonderful, four of the songs, "Dust My Broom", "Doctor Brown", "Need Your Love Tonight" and "Coming Home", all begin with an identical Elmore James riff. Spencer conducted an interview after the release of Mr Wonderful where he explained his creative output on the album, saying "At the time we did the Mr Wonderful album, there was a lot of Elmore James, but I wanted the chance to clear it all out of my system on record, which I have, almost." He then expressed interest in pivoting toward novelty music for future releases. Certain songs on Mr. Wonderful, including "Stop Messin' Round", "Lazy Poker Blues", and "Love That Burns", were performed live with members of the band Chicken Shack prior to the album's release. John Peel wrote some passages in the album's liner notes, which included commentary about the band members.

== Title and cover art ==
The band originally wanted the album to be titled A Good Length, which would have featured an "obvious phallic symbol" on the album's front cover according to Fleetwood, although this idea was rejected as the label thought it would be too obscene. Udder Sucker was the next proposed title, and drummer Mick Fleetwood travelled to his godmother's farm to take a photo underneath a cow for the cover art, but the record label also turned this idea down. Bob Brunning, who was the original bassist of Fleetwood Mac, said that he suggested the name Mr. Wonderful while socialising with Green at a restaurant. He mentioned that they were "mimicking and satirising television talk-show hosts' tendencies to eulogise their guests by announcing them as 'the truly wonderful', etc. [Green] liked the title and it stuck".

With the exception of a hat and some fig leaves, Fleetwood posed naked on the cover of Mr. Wonderful. The foldable album cover, which was photographed by Terence Ibbott, revealed Fleetwood's full body, which showed him holding a doll and a toy dog while wearing a loincloth made out of branches. Vernon mentioned that Ibbott "would come up with the most daft ideas, some of which were just vulgar to the point of being irresponsible and unusable". He also called Ibbott's work with the album cover "extraordinary".

== Critical reception ==
Professional ratings
Review scores
| Source | Rating |
|---|---|
| AllMusic | 2/5 stars |
| The Daily Vault | B |

Compared to the huge success of the band's first album, Fleetwood Mac, the follow-up received mixed critical reviews. Allen Evans of New Musical Express noted the album's "deep, exciting blues sounds" and thought that the vocals of Green and Spencer had a "smack of the Deep South" on certain tracks. Writing for Record Mirror, Derek Boltwood thought that the songs were "all recognizably Fleetwood Mac" even with the additions of a saxophone section. He wrote that the song "Lazy Poker Blues" "isn't as lazy as the title suggests" and described "Need Your Love Tonight" as "psychedelic-Hawaiian blues". Melody Maker dismissed the album as "unadventurous" that paled in comparison to the work of band's contemporaries such as Ten Years After and Cream.

In a retrospective review, Richie Unterberger wrote in AllMusic that the album was "a disappointment". He believed that "the limits of Jeremy Spencer's potential for creative contribution were badly exposed" and felt that Green's material failed to match his other material with Fleetwood Mac. Mojo characterised the album as a "misfire" and felt that the album lacked "the extraordinary spark that would soon ignite stand-alone singles 'Albatross' and 'Man of the World'". Tom Pinnock of Uncut described the album as "lacking in inspiration" and "old-fashioned...having more to do with the canny industry wiles of the mid-'60s than the brave new world of expansive music, expensive recordings and progressive blues".

== Track listing ==
Side one
| No. | Title | Writer(s) | Lead vocals | Length |
|---|---|---|---|---|
| 1. | "Stop Messin' Round" | Peter Green; C.G. Adams | Green | 2:22 |
| 2. | "I've Lost My Baby" | Jeremy Spencer | Spencer | 4:18 |
| 3. | "Rollin' Man" | Green; Adams | Green | 2:54 |
| 4. | "Dust My Broom" | Elmore James; Robert Johnson | Spencer | 2:54 |
| 5. | "Love That Burns" | Green; Adams | Green | 5:04 |
| 6. | "Doctor Brown" | J. T. Brown; W. Glasco | Spencer | 3:48 |

Side two
| No. | Title | Writer(s) | Lead vocals | Length |
|---|---|---|---|---|
| 7. | "Need Your Love Tonight" | Spencer | Spencer | 3:29 |
| 8. | "If You Be My Baby" | Green; Adams | Green | 3:54 |
| 9. | "Evenin' Boogie" | Spencer | Spencer | 2:42 |
| 10. | "Lazy Poker Blues" | Green; Adams | Green | 2:37 |
| 11. | "Coming Home" | James | Spencer | 2:41 |
| 12. | "Trying So Hard to Forget" | Green; Adams | Green | 4:47 |

== Personnel ==
Fleetwood Mac

- Peter Green – vocals, guitar
- Jeremy Spencer – vocals, slide guitar, piano
- John McVie – bass guitar
- Mick Fleetwood – drums

Additional personnel

- Christine Perfect – piano
- Duster Bennett – harmonica
- Steve Gregory – alto saxophone
- Dave Howard – alto saxophone
- Johnny Almond – tenor saxophone
- Roland Vaughan – tenor saxophone

Production

- Producer: Mike Vernon
- Engineer: Mike Ross
- Coordination: Richard Vernon
- Cover design: Terence Ibbott
- Photography: Terence Ibbott

== Charts ==
1968 weekly chart performance for Mr. Wonderful
| Chart (1968) | Peak position |
|---|---|
| Finnish Albums (The Official Finnish Charts) | 6 |
| Norwegian Albums (VG-lista) | 8 |
| UK Albums (Official Charts) | 10 |
