= Greatest Hits (1971 Fleetwood Mac album) =

Greatest hits album by Fleetwood Mac
- Released: November 1971
- Recorded: 1967–1970
- Genre: Blues rock
- Length: 43:23
- Label: CBS
- Producers: Mike Vernon, Fleetwood Mac

Fleetwood Mac chronology
Future Games (1971)	Greatest Hits (1971)	Bare Trees (1972)

Professional ratings
Review scores
Source	Rating
AllMusic	4.5/5 stars

Greatest Hits is a compilation album by the British blues rock band Fleetwood Mac released on CBS Records in the United Kingdom in 1971. The album assembles the band's hit singles in the UK covering the period from the band's beginning in 1968 to 1971, mostly in its original incarnation led by guitarist Peter Green. It peaked at No. 36 on the UK Albums Chart.

== Track listing ==
All tracks written by Peter Green except where noted.

Side one
No.	Title	Writer(s)	Original release	Length
1.	"The Green Manalishi (With the Two Prong Crown)"		Non-album single	4:36
2.	"Oh Well (Part 1)"		Non-album single	3:29
3.	"Oh Well (Part 2)"		B-side of "Oh Well (Part 1)"	5:39
4.	"Shake Your Moneymaker"	Elmore James	Fleetwood Mac	2:55
5.	"Need Your Love So Bad"	Little Willie John, Mertis John Jr.	Non-album single	3:53
6.	"Rattlesnake Shake"		Then Play On	3:29

Side two
No.	Title	Writer(s)	Original release	Length
7.	"Dragonfly"	Danny Kirwan, W. H. Davies	Non-album single	2:42
8.	"Black Magic Woman"		Non-album single	2:54
9.	"Albatross"		Non-album single	3:08
10.	"Man of the World"		Non-album single	2:51
11.	"Stop Messin' Round"	Green, C.G. Adams	Mr. Wonderful	2:19
12.	"Love That Burns"	Green, Adams	Mr. Wonderful	5:02

== Personnel ==
- Peter Green – vocals, guitar
- Jeremy Spencer – vocals, slide guitar, piano
- Danny Kirwan – vocals, guitar
- John McVie – bass guitar
- Mick Fleetwood – drums, percussion
- Christine McVie – piano

== Charts ==
1972 weekly chart performance for Greatest Hits
Chart (1972)	Peak position
UK Albums (Official Charts)	36

== Certifications ==
Region	Certification	Certified units/sales
United Kingdom (BPI)	Platinum	300,000^{^}
^{^} Shipments figures based on certification alone.
