= Fleetwood Mac (disambiguation) =

Fleetwood Mac were a British-American rock band.

Fleetwood Mac may also refer to:

- Fleetwood Mac (1968 album), also known as Peter Green's Fleetwood Mac, or the "Dog & Dustbin" album (from the album cover picture)
- Fleetwood Mac (1975 album), also known as the White Album
