= List of UK Jazz & Blues Albums Chart number ones of 2020 =

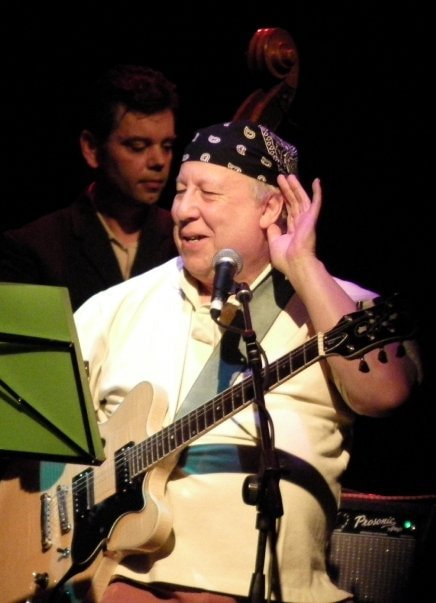
Following his death in July 2020, Peter Green spent six weeks atop the UK Jazz & Blues Albums Chart with Man of the World: The Anthology 1968–88. The Best of Peter Green's Fleetwood Mac also reached number one at the end of the year.

The UK Jazz & Blues Albums Chart is a record chart which ranks the best-selling jazz and blues albums in the United Kingdom. Compiled and published by the Official Charts Company, the data is based on each album's weekly physical sales, digital downloads and streams. In 2020, 52 charts were published with 33 albums at number one. The first number-one album of the year was I Shouldn't Be Telling You This, the second album by actor Jeff Goldblum and his jazz band, the Mildred Snitzer Orchestra. The last number-one album of the year was The Best of Peter Green's Fleetwood Mac by Fleetwood Mac featuring songs from their tenure with guitarist Peter Green.

The most successful album on the UK Jazz & Blues Albums Chart in 2020 was Man of the World: The Anthology 1968–88, a greatest hits album by Peter Green, which topped the chart for six weeks in the second half of the year following Green's death in July 2020. Kind of Blue by Miles Davis was the second most successful, returning to the top of the chart for a total of five weeks throughout the year. Rory Gallagher also spent five weeks at number one during 2020 – three weeks with the live album Check Shirt Wizard: Live in '77, two with the compilation Blues. Seven more albums topped the charts for two weeks each during the year.

== Chart history ==
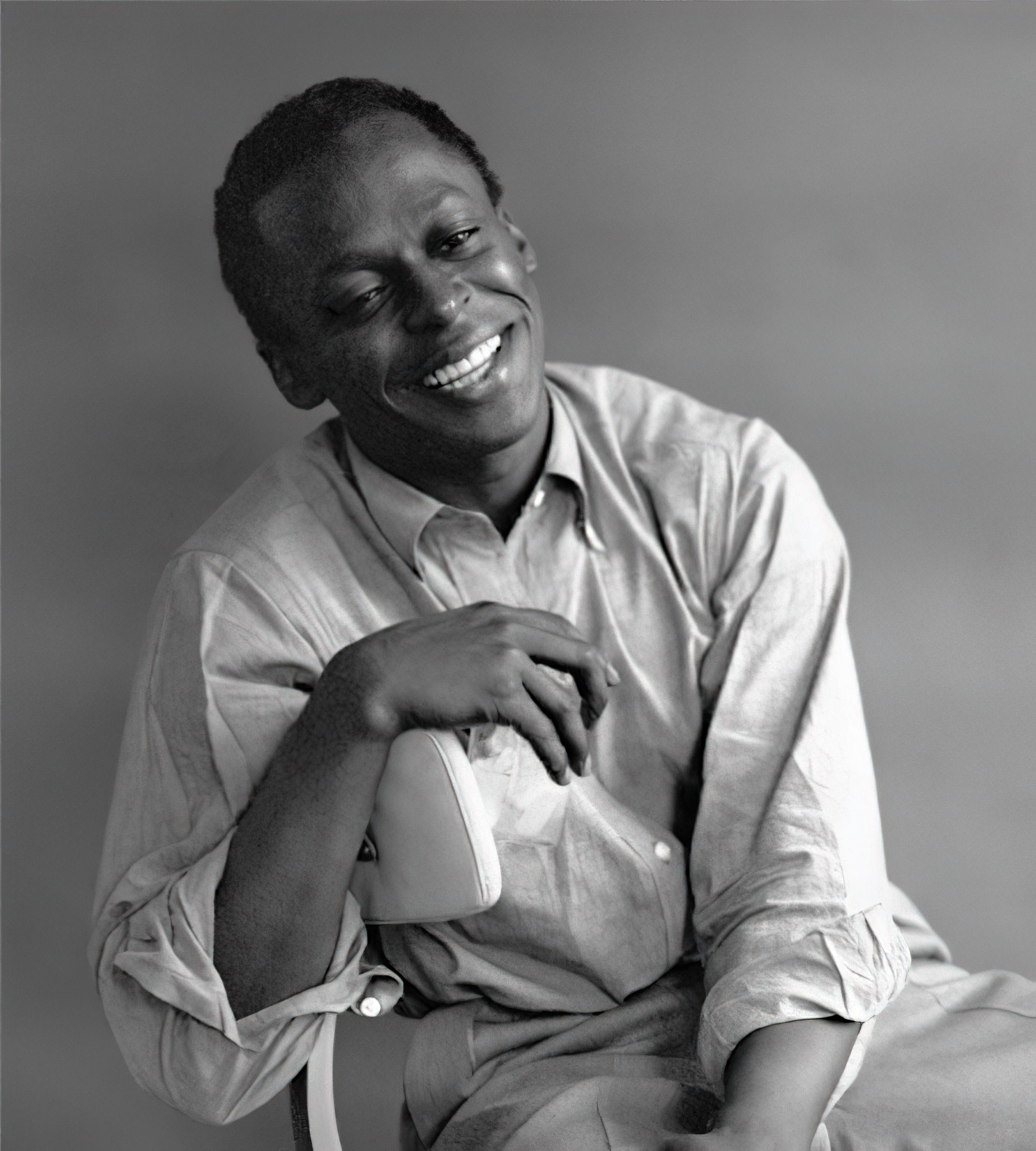
Kind of Blue by Miles Davis spent five weeks at number one in 2020.

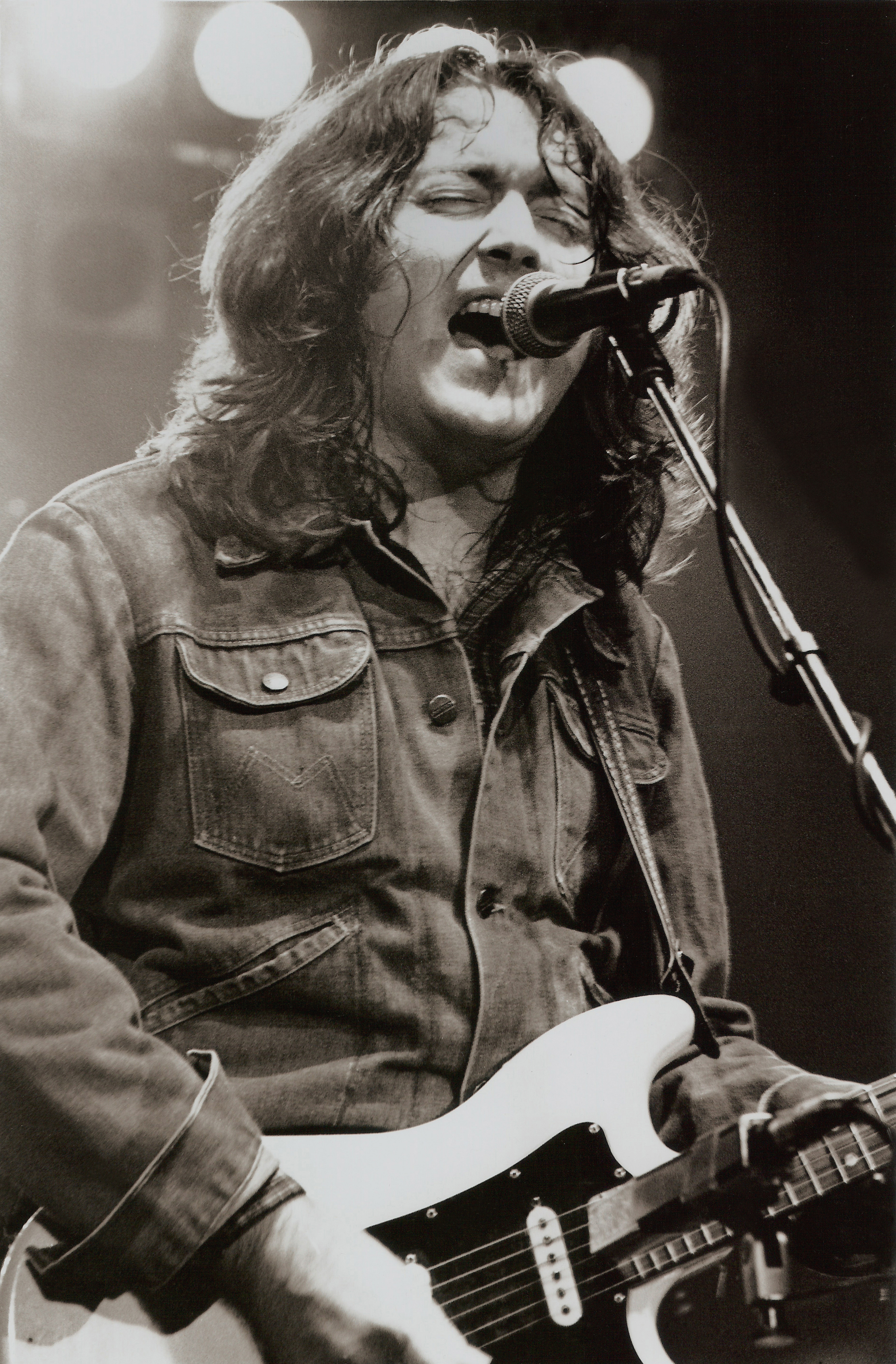
In 2020, Rory Gallagher spent two weeks at number one with Blues and three with Check Shirt Wizard: Live in '77.

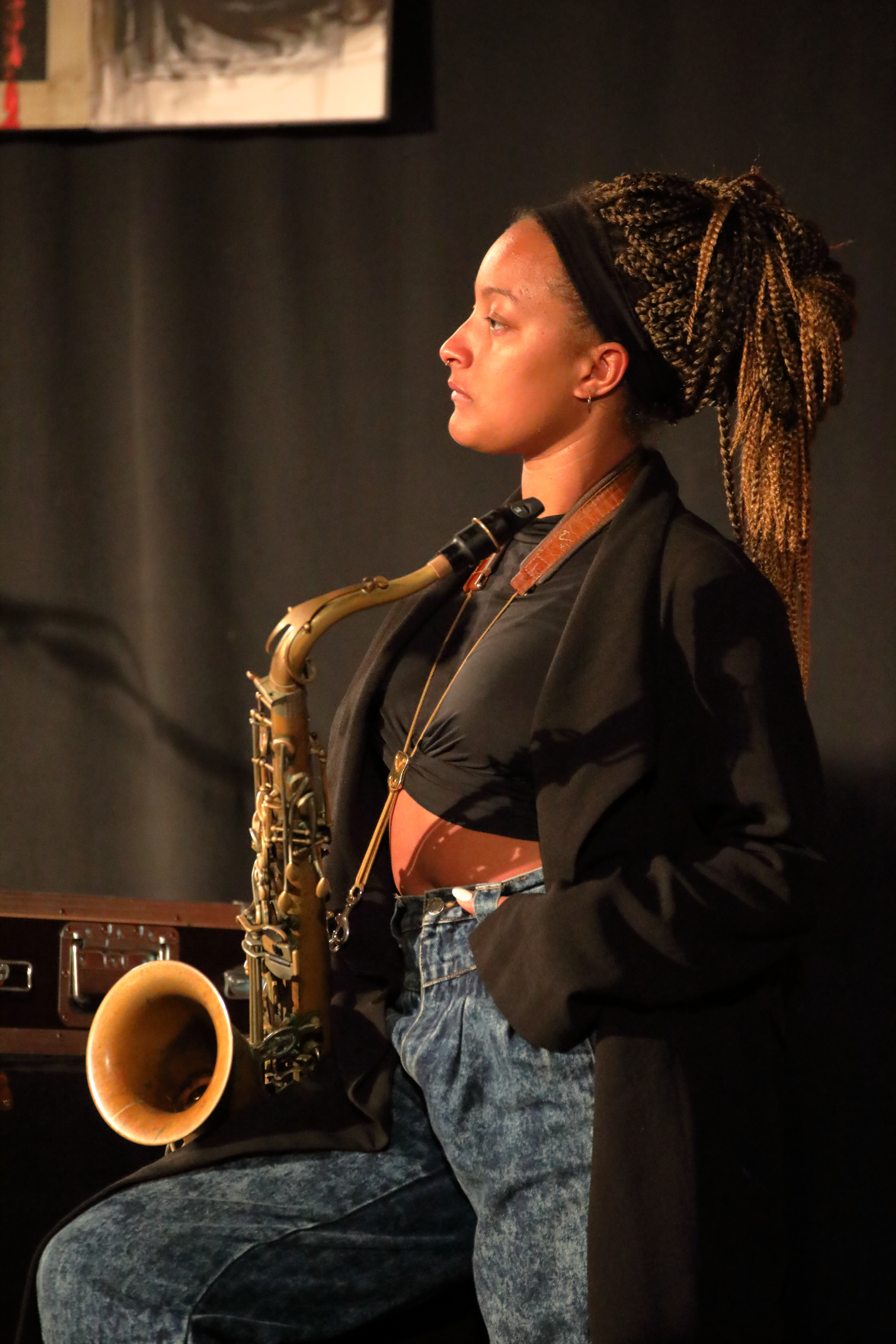
Nubya Garcia topped the UK Jazz & Blues Albums Chart with Source and was also featured on another number-one album, Blue Note Re:Imagined.

Issue date	Album	Artist(s)	Record label(s)	Ref.
3 January	I Shouldn't Be Telling You This	Jeff Goldblum, The Mildred Snitzer Orchestra	Decca	
10 January	Blues	Rory Gallagher	UMC	
17 January	Kind of Blue	Miles Davis	Columbia	
24 January	Blues	Rory Gallagher	UMC	
31 January	Suite for Max Brown	Jeff Parker	International Anthem	
7 February	War in My Mind	Beth Hart	Provogue	
14 February	We're New Again: A Re-Imagining	Gil Scott-Heron, Makaya McCraven	XL	
21 February	Live from London	Gary Moore	Provogue	
28 February	From This Place	Pat Metheny	Nonesuch	
6 March	That's What I Heard	Robert Cray	Nozzle	
13 March	Check Shirt Wizard: Live in '77	Rory Gallagher	UMC	
20 March	Check Shirt Wizard: Live in '77	Rory Gallagher	UMC	
27 March	Rejoice	Tony Allen, Hugh Masekela	World Circuit	
3 April	The Women Who Raised Me	Kandace Springs	UCJ	
10 April	Check Shirt Wizard: Live in '77	Rory Gallagher	UMC	
17 April	Kind of Blue	Miles Davis	Columbia	
24 April	Rejoice	Tony Allen, Hugh Masekela	World Circuit	
1 May	Good Souls Better Angels	Lucinda Williams	Highway 20	
8 May	Good Souls Better Angels	Lucinda Williams	Highway 20	
15 May	The Very Best of Glenn Miller	Glenn Miller	Sony	
22 May	To the Earth	Dinosaur	Edition	
29 May	Frank	Amy Winehouse	Island	
5 June	Kind of Blue	Miles Davis	Columbia	
12 June	Blues with Friends	Dion	KTBA	
19 June	Pick Me Up Off the Floor	Norah Jones	EMI	
26 June	Pick Me Up Off the Floor	Norah Jones	EMI	
3 July	Riding with the King	B. B. King, Eric Clapton	Reprise	
10 July	Blues with Friends	Dion	KTBA	
17 July	RoundAgain	Joshua Redman Quartet	Nonesuch	
24 July	Just Coolin'	Art Blakey, The Jazz Messengers	Blue Note	
31 July	Love & Peace	Seasick Steve	Contagious	
7 August	Love & Peace	Seasick Steve	Contagious	
14 August	A New Day Now	Joe Bonamassa	Provogue	
21 August	A New Day Now	Joe Bonamassa	Provogue	
28 August	Source	Nubya Garcia	Concord	
4 September	Ordinary Madness	Walter Trout	Provogue	
11 September	Sings Totally Blond	Michael Bublé	Metro	
18 September	Sings Totally Blond	Michael Bublé	Metro	
25 September	Man of the World: The Anthology 1968–88	Peter Green	Sanctuary	
2 October	This Dream of You	Diana Krall	UCJ	
9 October	Man of the World: The Anthology 1968–88	Peter Green	Sanctuary	
16 October	Man of the World: The Anthology 1968–88	Peter Green	Sanctuary	
23 October	Man of the World: The Anthology 1968–88	Peter Green	Sanctuary	
30 October	Blue Note Re:Imagined	various artists	Decca	
6 November	Man of the World: The Anthology 1968–88	Peter Green	Sanctuary	
13 November	Man of the World: The Anthology 1968–88	Peter Green	Sanctuary	
20 November	1995	Kruder & Dorfmeister	G-Stone	
27 November	Salute to the Sun	Matthew Halsall	Gondwana	
4 December	Straight to You: Live	Kenny Wayne Shepherd	Provogue	
11 December	Kind of Blue	Miles Davis	Columbia	
18 December	Kind of Blue	Miles Davis	Columbia	
25 December	The Best of Peter Green's Fleetwood Mac	Fleetwood Mac	Columbia	

== See also ==
- 2020 in British music
