= English Rose (album) =

Compilation album by Fleetwood Mac
- Released: December 1968
- Recorded: February–October 1968
- Genres: Blues rock, British blues
- Length: 40:14
- Label: Epic
- Producer: Mike Vernon

Fleetwood Mac compilations chronology
English Rose (1968)	The Pious Bird of Good Omen (1969)

Professional ratings
Review scores
Source	Rating
AllMusic	4.5/5 stars
The New Rolling Stone Album Guide	4/5 stars
Blender	4/5 stars

English Rose is a compilation album by British blues rock band Fleetwood Mac, released in December 1968 by Epic Records originally as a US-only compilation. The compilation album combines six tracks from the UK release Mr. Wonderful, three UK non-album single sides, two not-yet-released songs from the UK version of Then Play On, specifically "One Sunny Day" and "Without You", and "Something Inside of Me", which was a previously unreleased track. It was released a few months before the UK release of The Pious Bird of Good Omen, sharing four songs with that album.

Mick Fleetwood appears in drag on the cover. Fleetwood explained that he "got a schoolboy pleasure from shocking people" and that he collected "exotic jewelry, other erotica and those Victorian dolls that were made to be beautiful but are frightening to adults."

== Critical reception ==
Billboard expressed their belief that English Rose would "put Fleetwood Mac in the winner's circle." Record World thought that the album would bolster Fleetwood Mac's popularity in the United States. Cashbox referred to English Rose as an "excellent album", highlighting "Stop Messin' Round", "Something Inside of Me", "Black Magic Woman", and "Without You" as "particularly effective" tracks.

== Track listing ==
Side 1
No.	Title	Writer(s)	Other release	Length
1.	"Stop Messin' Round"	Clifford Adams, Peter Green	Mr. Wonderful	2:22
2.	"Jigsaw Puzzle Blues"	Danny Kirwan	Non-album single	1:36
3.	"Doctor Brown"	J. T. Brown, W. Glasco	Mr. Wonderful	3:46
4.	"Something Inside of Me"	Kirwan	Previously unreleased	3:57
5.	"Evenin' Boogie"	Jeremy Spencer	Mr. Wonderful	2:42
6.	"Love That Burns"	Adams, Green	Mr. Wonderful	5:05

Side 2
No.	Title	Writer(s)	Other release	Length
7.	"Black Magic Woman"	Peter Green	Non-album single	2:48
8.	"I've Lost My Baby"	Spencer	Mr. Wonderful	4:17
9.	"One Sunny Day"	Kirwan	Then Play On (UK version)	3:12
10.	"Without You"	Kirwan	Then Play On (UK version)	4:40
11.	"Coming Home"	Elmore James	Mr. Wonderful	2:40
12.	"Albatross"	Green	Non-album single	3:07

== Personnel ==
=== Fleetwood Mac ===
- Peter Green – vocals, guitar, harmonica
- Jeremy Spencer – vocals, slide guitar, piano (tracks 3, 8, and 11)
- Danny Kirwan – vocals, electric guitar
- John McVie – bass guitar
- Mick Fleetwood – drums

=== Additional personnel ===
- Christine Perfect — piano (tracks 1 and 6)

=== Production ===
- Mike Vernon – producer
- M. Ross – engineer
- Dinky Dawson – sound consultant

== Charts ==
Weekly chart performance for English Rose
Chart (1969)	Peak position
US Billboard 200	184
