= Need Your Love So Bad =

1955 song by Little Willie John

Single by Little Willie John

from the album Fever
- B-side: "Home at Last"
- Released: October 20, 1955
- Recorded: New York City, September 28, 1955
- Genre: Blues, rhythm & blues
- Length: 2:14
- Label: King
- Songwriters: William Edward John a.k.a. Little Willie John; Mertis John Jr.

Little Willie John singles chronology
"All Around the World" (1955)	"Need Your Love So Bad" (1955)	"Home At Last" (1956)

"Need Your Love So Bad", sometimes known as "I Need Your Love So Bad", is a song first recorded by Little Willie John in 1955. Called a "unique amalgam of gospel, blues and rhythm & blues", it was John's second single as well as his second record to reach the US charts.

The song is one of John's best known and appears on various compilation albums. Several other artists have also recorded renditions of the song.

== Composition and recording ==
"Need Your Love So Bad" follows an AABA form and a harmonic layout typical for the R&B ballad. However, the song has been described as "A tightly wound and intense plea for love ... quite different from the usual R&B ballad fare".

John recorded the song in New York City on September 20, 1955. He provides the vocal, accompanied by Robert "Bubber" Johnson on piano, Mickey Baker on guitar, Milton Hinton on bass, Calvin Shields on drums, Willis Jackson and David Van Dyke on tenor saxes, and Reuben Phillips on baritone sax.

== Songwriting credits and releases ==
There are differing accounts of the songwriting credits. The original King Records release lists the writer as "Willie John" as do the original Blue Horizon and CBS Records singles by Fleetwood Mac. However, some compilations show the writer as Mertis John, Willie's brother. A 2001 biography of Little Willie John includes:

Mertis Jr wrote much of the song in Korea, and brought it to Willie, who worked on it and eventually finished it off. Clearly, Willie's indelible stamp is on that tune, and Mertis restored Willie's name as co-writer in 2008.

The American performing rights organization BMI attributes the song to both William Edward John and Mertis John Jr. (Little Willie's and his brother's legal names).

King Records released John's single, which reached No. 5 on the Billboard R&B in 1956 and the B-side "Home at Last" reached No. 6 in the same chart. As one of John's most popular tunes, it has been included on various compilation albums, such as Fever: The Best of Little Willie John (1993) and The Very Best of Little Willie John (2001).

== Renditions by other artists ==
=== Irma Thomas ===
New Orleans R&B and soul blues singer Irma Thomas recorded the song as "I Need Your Love So Bad". Described as "deeply soulful", it first appeared on her 1964 album Wish Someone Would Care on Imperial Records. H. B. Barnum provided the arrangement, with the production duties handled by Eddie Ray. Album liner notes list the songwriter as "H. Dunham"; later compilations that include the song, such as Time Is on My Side (1983, Kent Records) show the composer as "John".

=== Fleetwood Mac ===
"Need Your Love So Bad"

Single by Fleetwood Mac
- B-side: "Stop Messin' Round"
- Released: 5 July 1968
- Recorded: London, 28 April 1968 (string & horn overdubs 15 May)
- Studio: CBS Studio
- Genre: Blues-rock
- Length: 3:53
- Label: Blue Horizon
- Songwriters: William Edward John a.k.a. Little Willie John; Mertis John Jr.
- Producer: Mike Vernon

Fleetwood Mac singles chronology
"Black Magic Woman"	"Need Your Love So Bad"	"Albatross"

In April 1968, Fleetwood Mac recorded "Need Your Love So Bad" for producer Mike Vernon's Blue Horizon Records. John Mayall encouraged Peter Green to cover the song. The initial recording sessions for "Need Your Love So Bad" took place on 11 April 1968, which yielded two incomplete takes, with one being aborted due to an incorrect piano chord. A complete recording from this session was included on The Complete Blue Horizon Sessions 1967–1969, which also featured McVie on piano.

A new session was arranged for 28 April, where Christine McVie switched over to organ for all subsequent run-throughs. Jeremy Spencer attended neither the original recording session nor the one arranged for 28 April. A few takes were recorded, including one with Steve Gregory on saxophone. Of the takes attempted, the third was labeled as the master. Vernon suggested to Green that a string section be added to improve the song's commercial viability. The band objected to the inclusion of the strings, although Vernon ultimately prevailed. Vernon contacted Mickey Baker, who provided the guitar on John's original version, to write an orchestral score for Fleetwood Mac's rendition. David Katz served as the violin leader for the recording session, which was held on 15 May.

"Need Your Love So Bad" was released as a single, backed with "Stop Messin' Round", and reached No. 31 on the UK Singles Chart in August 1968, and No. 7 in the Netherlands. The band originally considered releasing "Need Your Love So Bad" as a Part One and Part Two with the second half faded in, but they decided against this. In a review by New Musical Express, Derek Jones thought that the song was "too limited in its appeal" to be a successful single and that the string section was the "only concession to commerciality". He thought that the single was "super" and hoped that his assessment on the song's commercial prospects were incorrect.

Later in the UK, it was reissued as a single by Blue Horizon (designated as the A-side with "No Place to Go" as the B-side) and CBS as part of its "Hall of Fame Hits" series (designated as the B-side with "Albatross" as the A-side).

Green later expressed his grievances with the string section, saying that "it's not the arrangement that's old fashioned, it's the actual sound of the strings. It sounds like really old blokes were playing it...or old women." He posited that the song could have been a bigger hit without the string overdubs.

The song is included on several Fleetwood Mac compilation albums, including The Pious Bird of Good Omen (1969), Greatest Hits (1971), and others. In 1999, The Complete Blue Horizon Sessions 1967–1969 was released with additional takes of the song. One of those takes was planned for an American single, which included some additional guitar and vocal overdubs from Green, but this version was never commercially issued until its inclusion on The Complete Blue Horizon Sessions 1967–1969.

=== Whitesnake ===
On 3 January 1984, the song featured as the B-side of the UK release of rock band Whitesnake's second single "Give Me More Time", from the Slide It In album that was released in the UK on 6 February 1984. It featured David Coverdale singing over a Hammond organ played by keyboardist Jon Lord and with no other instrumentation on the version. The song also featured as the bonus track on the album's Japanese release.

=== Gary Moore ===
In 1995, guitarist and singer Gary Moore recorded the song for Blues for Greeny (1995), a tribute album to Peter Green, who sang and played guitar on Fleetwood Mac's rendition. Moore's version was also released as a single in June 1995 and reached No. 48 on the UK Singles Chart.
