= Duster Bennett =

Tony "Duster" Bennett
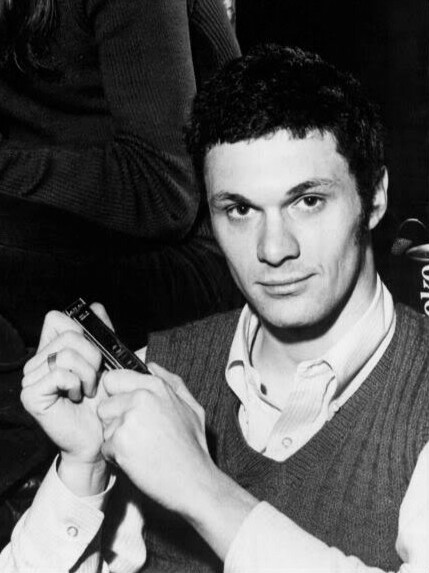
- Bennett with John Mayall on a 1970 US tour.

Background information
- Also known as: Duster Bennett
- Born: Anthony Bennett; 23 September 1946; Welshpool, Powys, Mid Wales
- Died: 26 March 1976 (aged 29) Warwickshire, England
- Genres: British blues; British R&B; acoustic blues; electric blues; blue-eyed soul
- Occupations: Musician; singer-songwriter
- Instruments: Vocals; acoustic guitar; slide guitar; electric guitar; harmonica; percussion; drums; keyboards; bass guitar; mandolin
- Years active: 1960s–1976
- Labels: Blue Horizon; Toadstool

Anthony "Duster" Bennett (23 September 1946 – 26 March 1976) was a British blues singer and musician. Based in London, his first album Smiling Like I'm Happy saw him playing as a one-man band, playing a bass drum with his foot and blowing a harmonica on a rack while strumming a 1952 Les Paul Goldtop guitar given to him in 1968 by Peter Green. Backed by his girlfriend Stella Sutton and the original Fleetwood Mac on three tracks, the album was well received. He remained popular on the local blues club scene until his death in a car crash in 1976.

== Early career ==
Bennett was born in Welshpool, Powys, Mid Wales. Emerging in the late 1960s from the art school music scene of Kingston-upon-Thames and Guildford, Bennett was a one-man blues band, in the style of bluesmen such as Joe Hill Louis, with virtuosity and coordination on drums, guitar and harmonica. His live sets combined his own compositions with Jimmy Reed-style blues standards often aided by friends Peter Green and Top Topham. He was a session musician in the early 1960s playing harmonica. Between 1968 and 1970 he was played on John Peel's Top Gear, toured and eventually joined John Mayall's Bluesbreakers as band member/solo act on a US tour in 1970. In the 1970s, he drifted off into more mainstream material.

== Musical style ==
Bennett's music was country blues with the occasional gospel music offering, but his last album Fingertips (1975) differs from the earlier records; it was made with influences of soul, R&B and funk. Bennett recorded three albums and a string of singles for Blue Horizon. Bright Lights was recorded live at the Gin Mill Club in Godalming, Surrey. Bennett's "Jumping at Shadows" was subsequently covered by Fleetwood Mac and revived in 1992 by Gary Moore, who covered it in his After Hours album. Attempts to gain wider appeal with Mickie Most were unsuccessful. For decades, a clutch of live and home recordings on Indigo seemed to be all that remained of his work until the 2006 release of the Complete Blue Horizon Sessions.

== Death ==
After performing with Memphis Slim on 26 March 1976, in Burslem, Stoke-on-Trent, Bennett was driving home in a Ford Transit van in Warwickshire when he apparently fell asleep at the wheel. The van collided with a truck and Bennett was killed.

== Discography ==
=== Albums ===
- 1968: Smiling Like I'm Happy (Blue Horizon)
- 1969: Bright Lights (live session) (Blue Horizon)
- 1969: Justa Duster (Blue Horizon)
- 1970: 12dbs (Blue Horizon)
- 1975: Fingertips (Toadstool Records)
- 1975: Levi's Blues (Toadstool Records) – Live album with Hound Dog Taylor and The Houserockers, Alexis Korner and Duster Bennett, recorded (engineer Ian McKenzie) at the Royal Melbourne Showgrounds, Ascot Vale, Victoria, Australia. Contains the track by Duster Bennett, "Bright Lights, Big City" (6:10)
- 1994: Jumpin' at Shadows (Indigo Records)
- 1996: Blue Inside (Indigo Records)

=== Compilation albums ===
- 1998: I Choose to Sing the Blues (Rare & Unreleased Recordings 1968-71 Vol 1) (Indigo Records)
- 1999: Comin' Home (Rare & Unreleased Recordings Vol 2) (Indigo Records)
- 2000: Shady Little Baby (Rare & Unreleased Recordings Vol 3) (Indigo Records)
- 2006: Complete Blues Horizon Sessions (a collection of the first three albums plus early singles)

=== Singles ===
- 1968: "It's a Man Down There" / "Things Are Changing" (45 rpm single, Blue Horizon 57-3141)
- January 1969: "Raining In My Heart" / "Jumpin' For Joy" (45 rpm single, Blue Horizon 57-3148)
- July 1969: "Bright Lights, Big City" / "Fresh Country Jam" (45 rpm single, Blue Horizon, 57-3154)
- July 1969: "I'm Gonna Wind Up Ending Up or I'm Gonna End Up Winding Up with You" / "Rock of Ages Cleft For Me" (45 rpm single, Blue Horizon 57-3164)
- October 1970: "Act Nice & Gentle" / "I Want You To Love Me" (45 rpm single, Blue Horizon 57-3179)
- 1970: "I Chose To Sing The Blues" / "If You Could Hang Your Washing Like You Hang Your Lines" (45 rpm single, Blue Horizon 57-3173)
- July 1974: "Comin' Home" / "Pretty Little Thing" (45 rpm single, RAK Records RAK 177)

== Bibliography ==
- M. Bane (1982), White Boy Singin' the Blues, London: Penguin, ISBN 0-14-006045-6
- Bob Brunning (1986, 1995, 2003), Blues: The British Connection, London: Helter Skelter Publishing, ISBN 1-900924-41-2
- Bob Brunning (1990, 1998), The Fleetwood Mac Story: Rumours and Lies, Omnibus Press London, ISBN 0-7119-6907-8
- Martin Celmins (1995, 1998, 2003), Peter Green – Founder of Fleetwood Mac, Sanctuary: London, foreword by B. B. King, ISBN 1-898141-13-4, ISBN 1-86074-233-5, ISBN 1-86074-507-5
- Dick Heckstall-Smith (2004), The Safest Place in the World: A Personal History of British Rhythm and Blues, Clear Books, ISBN 0-7043-2696-5 – First Edition: Blowing The Blues – Fifty Years Playing The British Blues.
- Christopher Hjort (2007), Strange Brew: Eric Clapton and the British Blues Boom, 1965-1970, foreword by John Mayall, Jawbone Press, ISBN 1-906002-00-2
- Paul Myers (2007), Long John Baldry and the Birth of the British Blues, Vancouver – GreyStone Books.
- Harry Shapiro (1997), Alexis Korner: The Biography, Bloomsbury Publishing PLC: London, Discography by Mark Troster.
- Martin Celmins (2007), Duster Bennett – Jumping at Shadows was published by Jet Martin.
