= Black Magic Woman =

Fleetwood Mac song, released 1968

Single by Fleetwood Mac
- B-side: "The Sun Is Shining"
- Released: 29 March 1968
- Recorded: February 1968
- Studio: CBS Studios, London
- Genre: Blues rock
- Length: 2:48
- Label: Blue Horizon (57-3138)
- Songwriter: Peter Green
- Producer: Mike Vernon

Fleetwood Mac singles chronology
"I Believe My Time Ain't Long" (1967)	"Black Magic Woman" (1968)	"Need Your Love So Bad" (1968)

"Black Magic Woman" is a song written by British musician Peter Green, which first appeared as a single for his band Fleetwood Mac in 1968. Subsequently, the song appeared on the 1969 Fleetwood Mac compilation albums English Rose (US) and The Pious Bird of Good Omen (UK), as well as the later Greatest Hits and Vintage Years compilations and the box set 25 Years – The Chain.

In 1970, the song was released as the first single from Santana's album Abraxas. The song, as sung by Gregg Rolie, reached number four on the US and Canadian charts, and its chart success made Santana's recording the better-known version of the song.

The song was also covered by former Fleetwood Mac member Bob Welch on his 2006 album His Fleetwood Mac Years and Beyond, Vol. 2. Although Welch was not a member of the group at the time of the original recording, he had performed a number of Peter Green's songs during his time with the band, including "Black Magic Woman".

== Composition ==
"Black Magic Woman" was written by Peter Green in 1968, with lyrics inspired by his former girlfriend, Sandra Elsdon, whom Green had nicknamed "Magic Mamma". Green has acknowledged that "Black Magic Woman" was musically influenced by "All Your Love", an Otis Rush song that had been recorded two years earlier by Green's former band, John Mayall & the Bluesbreakers, with Eric Clapton, Green's predecessor, on lead guitar. Green said in Peter Green: The Biography: "One of things [Mayall] said was that if you really like something, you should take the first lines and make up another song from them. So that's what I did with 'Black Magic Woman'."

"Black Magic Woman" is a minor blues with a Latin rhythm first explored in Green's "I Loved Another Woman" in Fleetwood Mac's 1968 self-titled debut album. Mike Vernon, who produced the recording session for "Black Magic Woman", said that the song "represents a high spot in the band's early recording career."

=== Structure and recording ===
"Black Magic Woman" has the same chord structure, guitar breaks, and even a similar melody to "I Loved Another Woman". Set in the key of D minor, the verse follows a twelve bar chord progression alternating between D minor^{7}, A minor^{7}, and G minor^{7}, and the instrumentation consists of vocals, two guitars, bass guitar, and drums. It is homophonic, the voice and lead guitar taking the lead roles. The song is set in common time (4/4), with the rhythm "pushing" on the upbeat, then breaking into a shuffle beat jam after the final verse.

Fleetwood Mac recorded the song at CBS Studios on 14 February 1968 with Mike Vernon as producer and Mike Ross as the audio engineer for the session. Take 7 was selected as the master from that session; additional work was also conducted on 22 February 1968 at the same recording facility. The song begins with guitar harmonics that create a simmering effect. A slightly distorted solo is played in the middle of the song and an additional solo follows during the coda. "Black Magic Woman" was recorded with Green on guitars and vocals, John McVie on bass, and Mick Fleetwood on drums. The band's other member, Jeremy Spencer, did not participate on the recording of "Black Magic Woman". He instead appeared on their cover of Elmore James's "The Sun is Shining", which was issued as a B-side of "Black Magic Woman" along with "Long Grey Mare".

== Performances ==
Fleetwood Mac's "Black Magic Woman" was released as a single on 29 March 1968 in the United Kingdom and 7 June 1968 in the United States. In an interview published prior to the single's release, Spencer predicted that it "wouldn't be a hit". It reached number 37 on the UK Singles Chart and did not chart in the United States. After Spencer left the band in 1971, Green temporarily returned to fulfill the remaining scheduled dates. These performances would include an extended instrumental jam of "Black Magic Woman" that often exceeded the original run-time of the studio recording. In his biography of Peter Green, Martin Celmins wrote that the band's performance of "Black Magic Woman" at the Filmore East lasted four hours. By the time of 1987's Shake the Cage Tour, performance of "Black Magic Woman" was blocked by John McVie, who felt the song too closely linked to Santana. As such, "I Loved Another Woman", another Green composition, was played during that tour instead. Stevie Nicks performed "Black Magic Woman" with slight changes in lyrics in the 2018-2019 tour An Evening with Fleetwood Mac.

Peter Green played the song with Santana at the 1998 Rock and Roll Hall of Fame Induction Ceremony where the inductees included both Fleetwood Mac and Santana. Santana had tasked Fleetwood with recruiting Green to play guitar on "Black Magic Woman" for the induction ceremony. Green agreed to participate and joined Santana for a rehearsal to run through the song, where he played "one, maybe two sustained notes" according to Fleetwood. After the rehearsal, Green told Fleetwood that he was unwilling to recreate one of his guitar solos from his earlier live performances of "Black Magic Woman" based on his belief that doing so would be tantamount to retreading old territory. Green still agreed to play at the induction ceremony and turned his volume down on his guitar on a few occasions, which made the instrument largely inaudible within the venue.

== Personnel ==
- Peter Green – lead and rhythm guitars, vocals
- John McVie – bass guitar
- Mick Fleetwood – drums

== Charts ==
Chart performance for "Black Magic Woman"
Chart (1968)	Peak position
UK Singles (Official Charts)	37

== Santana version ==
"Black Magic Woman"
- Artwork for the US vinyl single

Single by Santana

from the album Abraxas
- B-side: "Hope You're Feeling Better"
- Released: November 1970
- Studio: Wally Heider Studios (San Francisco, CA)
- Genre: Blues rock; Latin rock; psychedelic rock
- Length: 5:24 (album version); 3:20 (single version)
- Label: Columbia
- Songwriters: Peter Green ("Black Magic Woman"); Gábor Szabó ("Gypsy Queen")
- Producers: Fred Catero; Carlos Santana

Santana singles chronology
"Soul Sacrifice" (1970)	"Black Magic Woman" (1970)	"Oye Como Va" (1971)

=== Background ===
Santana's version, recorded in 1970, is a medley with Gábor Szabó's 1966 instrumental "Gypsy Queen", a mix of jazz, Hungarian folk and Latin rhythms. The song became one of Santana's staples and one of their biggest hits, with the single spending 13 weeks on the Billboard Hot 100 chart and peaking at number four in January 1971, their highest-peaking Hot 100 hit until 1999's "Smooth". Santana's 1970 album, Abraxas, reached No. 1 on the charts and hit quadruple platinum in 1986, partially thanks to "Black Magic Woman". The song made a brief re-appearance on the Canadian charts in March 1978, reaching #91.

"Gypsy Queen" was omitted from the single version contained on 1974's Santana's Greatest Hits album, even though radio stations usually play "Black Magic Woman" and "Gypsy Queen" as one song.

=== Structure ===
While the song follows the same general structure of Peter Green's version, also set in common time, in D minor and using the same melody and lyrics, it is considerably different, with a slightly altered chord pattern (Dm_{7}– Am_{7}–Dm_{7}–Gm_{7}–Dm_{7}–Am_{7}–Dm_{7}), occasionally mixing between the Dorian and Aeolian modes, especially in the song's intro. A curious blend of blues, rock, jazz, 3/2 afro-Cuban son clave, and "Latin" polyrhythms, Santana's arrangement added conga, timbales and other percussion, in addition to organ and piano, to make complex polyrhythms that give the song a "voodoo" feel distinct from the original.

The introduction of the song, which was adapted from Szabó's "Gypsy Queen", consists of simple hammer-ons, pull-offs and slides on the guitar and bass, before moving into the introductory guitar solo of "Black Magic Woman". After the introductory solo, which follows the same chord progression as the verse, the song moves into an eight-bar piano solo in D minor, and proceeds to two verses sung by keyboardist Gregg Rolie. Two verses of guitar solo follow the two sung verses, which are then succeeded by another verse, before moving into a modified version of the "Gypsy Queen" section from the beginning of the song to end the piece.

There is also a single edit, a slightly shorter version of the song that omits the opening piano solo and the "Gypsy Queen" portion, that runs for 3:15, while some radio versions play the full recording. Other longer versions have since been released, including one version which runs for 8:56.

=== Charts ===
==== Weekly charts ====
Chart (1970–1971)	Peak position
Australian Singles (Kent Music Report)	15
Austria (Ö3 Austria Top 40)	16
Belgium (Ultratop 50 Wallonia)	38
Canada Top Singles (RPM)	4
Finnish Singles (The Official Finnish Charts)	30
Italy (Musica e dischi)	27
Spain (AFE)	22
US Billboard Hot 100	4
US Adult Contemporary (Billboard)	29
West Germany (GfK)	14

==== Year-end charts ====
Chart (1970)	Position
Canada Top Singles (RPM)	88
Chart (1971)	Position
Canada Top Singles (RPM)	74

=== Certifications ===
Region	Certification	Certified units/sales
New Zealand (RMNZ)	Platinum	30,000^{‡}
United Kingdom (BPI)	Silver	200,000^{‡}
^{‡} Sales+streaming figures based on certification alone.
