= Mike Vernon (producer) =

English record producer (1944–2026)

Mike Vernon MBE
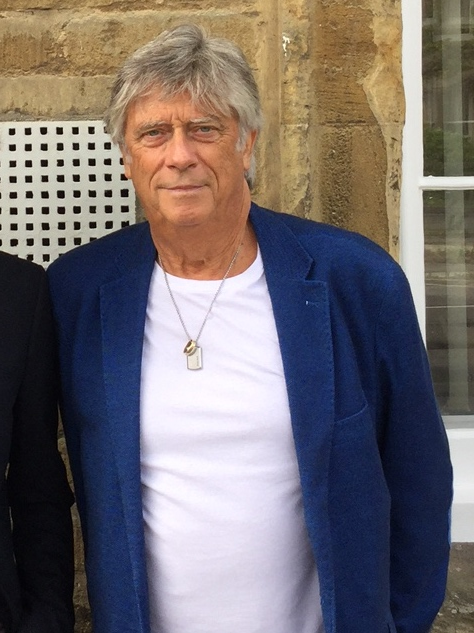
- Vernon in 2017

Background information
- Born: Michael William Hugh Vernon; 20 November 1944; Harrow, Middlesex, England
- Died: 2 March 2026 (aged 81) Andalusia, Spain
- Genres: Blues; pop rock
- Occupations: Record producer; recording engineer; executive producer
- Years active: 1963–2026
- Labels: CBS; Polydor; Blue Horizon; Decca

Michael William Hugh Vernon (20 November 1944 – 2 March 2026) was an English music executive, studio owner and record producer. He produced albums for British blues artists and groups in the 1960s, working with the Bluesbreakers, David Bowie, Duster Bennett, Savoy Brown, Chicken Shack, Climax Blues Band, Eric Clapton, Focus, Fleetwood Mac, Peter Green, Danny Kirwan, John Mayall, Christine McVie and Ten Years After.

== Life and career ==
Michael William Hugh Vernon was born on 20 November 1944 in Harrow, Middlesex. He is best known as founder of the blues record label, Blue Horizon. He worked at Decca Records starting in 1963, and produced the Mayall-Clapton collaboration Blues Breakers with Eric Clapton (1966). In 1967, Vernon produced David Bowie's debut album for Deram Records. In 1968 he produced Fleetwood Mac's million-selling hit single "Albatross". The 1971 Blue Horizon release Bring It Back Home featured Paul Kossoff and Rory Gallagher, each appearing on one track. Two years later, Vernon released a solo album, Moment of Madness, on Sire Records. He was also a member of Olympic Runners (1974–1979) and acted as producer for them. He was a producer and member of Rocky Sharpe and the Replays (1979–1983). With the Replays he sang bass under the pseudonym of Eric Rondo. He founded the Indigo and Code Blue record labels in the 1990s.

In 1971, Vernon and his brother Richard opened Chipping Norton Recording Studios as the in-house studio for the Blue Horizon label. The studio became a commercial enterprise and operated until 1999, recording many hit singles including "Baker Street" by Gerry Rafferty, "In the Army Now" by Status Quo, "Too Shy" by Kajagoogoo, "I Should Have Known Better" by Jim Diamond, "Promise Me" by Beverley Craven, "I'm Gonna Be (500 Miles)" by the Proclaimers, "Perfect" by Fairground Attraction, "(I Just) Died in Your Arms" by Cutting Crew, "Eighteen with a Bullet" by Pete Wingfield, "Hocus Pocus" by Focus and "Bye, Bye, Baby (Baby Goodbye)" by the Bay City Rollers.. Duran Duran recorded most of their debut album Duran Duran (1981) with Colin Thurston as producer, and Radiohead recorded their 1993 debut album, Pablo Honey, including their debut single "Creep".

Vernon came out of retirement in 2011 to produce Dani Wilde's album Shine, and the second album by the British blues prodigy, Oli Brown. Brown's album entitled Heads I Win, Tails You Lose was released in March 2010.

In October 2013, Vernon was rewarded with a BASCA Gold Badge Award, in recognition of his unique contribution to music.

On 7 September 2018, Vernon's first album on Manhaton Records, Beyond The Blue Horizon, was released. It featured twelve tracks, including nine new self-penned originals, and three covers from the catalogues of Brook Benton, Mose Allison and Clarence "Frogman" Henry. The release was supported by a European tour under the billing of 'Mike Vernon & The Mighty Combo'. Vernon's band, The Mighty Combo, consisted of Kid Carlos (guitar), Ian Jennings (upright bass), Matt Little (keyboards), Paul Tasker (saxophone) and Mike Hellier (drums).

Vernon was appointed Member of the Order of the British Empire (MBE) in the 2020 Birthday Honours for services to music. He died after a short illness at his home in Andalusia, Spain, on 2 March 2026, at the age of 81.

== Production discography ==
- 1965 – Five Long Years – Eddie Boyd
- 1965 – From the Land of Green Ginger – The Green Ginger Three
- 1966 – From New Orleans to Chicago – Champion Jack Dupree
- 1966 – Bluesbreakers with Eric Clapton – John Mayall & the Bluesbreakers
- 1966 – Art Gallery – The Artwoods
- 1966 – "Rubber Band" – David Bowie
- 1966 – Sound of Sitar – Chim Kothari
- 1966 – I Tried – Savoy Brown Blues Band
- 1967 – Champion Jack Dupree and His Blues Band – Champion Jack Dupree featuring Mickey Baker
- 1967 – "Love You till Tuesday" – David Bowie
- 1967 – The Blues Alone – John Mayall
- 1967 – A Hard Road – John Mayall & the Bluesbreakers
- 1967 – Crusade – John Mayall & the Bluesbreakers
- 1967 – David Bowie – David Bowie
- 1967 – Eddie Boyd and His Blues Band – Eddie Boyd (Liner notes)
- 1967 – Raw Blues – Various Artists
- 1967 – Shake Down – Savoy Brown
- 1967 – Ten Years After – Ten Years After
- 1968 – The 1968 Memphis Country Blues Festival – Various Artists
- 1968 – Roosevelt Holts: Presenting The Country Blues (Production)
- 1968 – 40 Blue Fingers, Freshly Packed and Ready to Serve – Chicken Shack
- 1968 – 7936 South Rhodes – Eddie Boyd
- 1968 – Bare Wires – John Mayall & the Bluesbreakers
- 1968 – Blues from Laurel Canyon – John Mayall
- 1968 – Long Overdue – Gordon Smith
- 1968 – Diary of a Band, Vol. 1 – John Mayall & the Bluesbreakers
- 1968 – Diary of a Band, Vol. 2 – John Mayall & the Bluesbreakers
- 1968 – Getting to the Point – Savoy Brown
- 1968 – Last Night's Dream – Johnny Shines
- 1968 – Fleetwood Mac – Fleetwood Mac
- 1968 – Mr. Wonderful – Fleetwood Mac
- 1968 – Undead – Ten Years After (Liner notes)
- 1968 – Fully Interlocking – The Web
- 1968 – Memphis Hot Shots – Bukka White (Production, liner notes, photo)
- 1968 -- "Albatross" – Fleetwood Mac
- 1969 – 100 Ton Chicken – Chicken Shack
- 1969 – The Biggest Thing Since Colossus – Otis Spann (Liner notes)
- 1969 – Blue Matter – Savoy Brown (Percussion, arranger, assistant)
- 1969 – Fleetwood Mac in Chicago/Blues Jam in Chicago, Vols. 1-2 – Fleetwood Mac
- 1969 – English Rose – Fleetwood Mac
- 1969 – First Slice – Jellybread
- 1969 – Heavy Blues – Champion Jack Dupree
- 1969 – Looking Back – John Mayall (Liner notes)
- 1969 – Midnight Jump – Sunnyland Slim
- 1969 – O.K. Ken? – Chicken Shack
- 1969 – Fiends And Angels – Martha Veléz
- 1969 – Patent Pending – The Johnny Almond Music Machine
- 1969 – The Pious Bird of Good Omen – Fleetwood Mac
- 1969 – A Step Further – Savoy Brown (Percussion, bells)
- 1969 – Box Of Surprises – Dana Gillespie (Production)
- 1969 – Stonedhenge – Ten Years After (Vocals)
- 1969 – Presenting the Country Blues/Furry Lewis (Production, liner notes)
- 1969 – Presenting the Country Blues/Mississippi Joe Callicott (Production, liner notes)
- 1970 – Theraphosa Blondi – The Web
- 1970 – Stars of the 1969–1970 Memphis Country Blues Festival – Various Artists
- 1970 – Grease One for Me – Bacon Fat
- 1970 – Christine Perfect – Christine McVie
- 1970 – White Hot Blue Black – John L. Watson
- 1970 – In and Out of Focus – Focus (Liner notes, supervisor)
- 1970 – The End of the Game – Peter Green
- 1970 – Accept – Chicken Shack
- 1971 – Black Magic Woman – Fleetwood Mac
- 1971 – Bring It Back Home – Mike Vernon (Harmonica, percussion, vocals)
- 1971 – The Original Fleetwood Mac – Fleetwood Mac
- 1971 – Moving Waves – Focus (Liner notes, supervisor)
- 1971 – Rick Hayward – Rick Hayward (Liner notes)
- 1971 – Thru the Years – John Mayall
- 1972 – Alvin Lee and Company – Ten Years After
- 1972 – Discovering the Blues – Robben Ford
- 1972 – Focus 3 – Focus (Supervisor, backing vocals)
- 1972 – Rocking at the Tweed Mill – Livin' Blues
- 1973 – At the Rainbow – Focus (Supervisor)
- 1973 – History of British Blues Vol. 1 (Various Artists) (Production, liner notes and on one song)
- 1973 – Ram Jam Josey – Livin' Blues
- 1974 – Burglar – Freddie King (Percussion)
- 1974 – Hamburger Concerto – Focus
- 1975 – Larger Than Life – Freddie King (Percussion)
- 1975 – Love Is a Five Letter Word – Jimmy Witherspoon (Percussion)
- 1975 – Out in Front – Olympic Runners (Percussion)
- 1975 – Vintage Years – Fleetwood Mac
- 1976 – Do You Wanna Do a Thing – Bloodstone
- 1976 – Gold Plated – Climax Blues Band
- 1976 – Live – Jimmy Witherspoon & Robben Ford (Executive production, editing, mixing)
- 1977 – Best of Savoy Brown – Savoy Brown
- 1977 – Edwin Starr – Edwin Starr (Tambourine, vibraslap)
- 1977 – Hot to Trot – Olympic Runners (Percussion, vocals)
- 1977 – On the Line – Foster Brothers
- 1977 – Ship of Memories – Focus
- 1977 – Soul Survivors – Diversions
- 1978 – Focus con Proby – Focus (Liner notes, supervisor)
- 1978 – Puttin' It Onya – Olympic Runners (Percussion, vocals)
- 1979 – Let It Roll – Dr. Feelgood
- 1979 – Out of the Ground – Olympic Runners (Percussion)
- 1979 – Rama Lama – Rocky Sharpe and the Replays
- 1980 – Rock-It-To Mars – Rocky Sharpe and the Replays
- 1980 – Let's Go (Shout! Shout!) – Rocky Sharpe and the Replays
- 1981 – Level 42 – Level 42
- 1982 – The Pursuit of Accidents – Level 42
- 1983 – Stop! Please Stop! – Rocky Sharpe and the Replays
- 1983 – Good Rockin' Tonight – Johnny & the Roccos (Production)
- 1984 – End of the Line – Pete McDonald
- 1985 – Graffiti – New Jordal Swingers
- 1986 – Mad Man Blues – Dr. Feelgood
- 1986 – On the Loose – Steve Gibbons
- 1987 – Hat Trick – Blues 'N' Trouble (Percussion)
- 1987 – Guitar Guitar – 32/20
- 1988 – Crossroads – Eric Clapton
- 1988 – Great British Psychedelic Trip, Vol. 1, 1966-69 – Various Artists
- 1988 – John Mayall and the Bluesbreakers – John Mayall
- 1988 – Roachford – Roachford
- 1988 – Songs for the Weekend – New Jordal Swingers
- 1988 - “Bad to the Bone” - Bad to the Bone
- 1989 – Level Best – Level 42
- 1989 – Singles – The UA Years – Dr. Feelgood
- 1989 – Steel & Fire – The Mick Clarke Band (Engineer)
- 1989 – Mick 'Wildman' Pini – Mick Pini
- 1989 – Storyteller – The Complete Anthology: 1964–1990 – Rod Stewart
- 1990 - “Whirlwind on Fire” - Bad to the Bone
- 1990 – Blues It Up – Dana Gillespie (Percussion)
- 1991 – That's What The Blues Can Do – The Innes Sibun Blues Explosion (Production)
- 1991 – Second Sight – Chris Youlden (Vocals, engineer)
- 1992 – 25 Years – The Chain – Fleetwood Mac
- 1992 – Attack of the Atomic Guitar – U.P. Wilson (Engineer, mixing)
- 1992 – Blue Lightning – Lightnin' Slim (Mixing)
- 1992 – Blues, the Whole Blues & Nothing But the Blues – Jimmy Witherspoon (Percussion, engineer, mixing, liner notes)
- 1992 – Chiswick Story – Various Artists
- 1992 – Delta Bluesman – David Honeyboy Edwards
- 1993 – Dog Days Are Over – The Scabs
- 1993 – Delta Hurricane – Larry McCray
- 1993 – Clima Raro – Danza Invisible
- 1994 – I'm the Man – Sherman Robertson
- 1994 – Live Dog – The Scabs
- 1994 – Sound Like This – The Hoax
- 1994 – Al Compás de la Banda – Danza Invisible
- 1995 – The Real Deal – John Primer
- 1995 – Dos Caras Distintas – Los Secretos
- 1996 – A Man Amongst Men – Bo Diddley (Production, liner notes, percussion)
- 1997 – Me To You – Eric Bibb (Production, backing vocals, percussion)
- 1998 – Swango – Candye Kane (Production, backing vocals, tambourine)
- 1999 – The Complete Blue Horizon Sessions 1967–1969 – Fleetwood Mac (Production)
- 2007 – The Complete Blue Horizon Sessions – Otis Spann (Production)
- 2007 – Furry Lewis & Mississippi Joe Callicott – The Complete Blue Horizon Sessions (Production, liner notes, photos)
- 2007 – The 1968 Memphis Country Blues festival – Bukka White The Complete Blue Horizon Sessions (Production, liner notes, photos)
- 2008 – The Complete Blue Horizon Sessions – Jellybread (Production, liner notes)
- 2008 – The Complete Blue Horizon Sessions – Top Topham (Production, liner notes)
- 2008 – The Complete Blue Horizon Sessions – Key Largo (Production, liner notes)
- 2008 – The Complete Blue Horizon Sessions – Gordon Smith (Production, liner notes)
- 2008 – The Complete Blue Horizon Sessions – Eddie Boyd (Production, liner notes)
- 2008 – The Complete Blue Horizon Sessions – Champion Jack Dupree (Production, liner notes)
- 2010 – Heads I Win, Tails You Lose – Oli Brown (Production)
- 2010 – Shine – Dani Wilde (Production)
- 2010 – Fun to Visit – Mingo & The Blues Intruders (Production)
- 2015 – Just A Little Bit – Mike Vernon & Los García (vocals & kazoo – Production & liner notes)
- 2016 – Take Me High – Laurence Jones (Production)
- 2016 – A Force of Nature – Sari Schorr (Production)

== Bibliography ==
- Bob Brunning, Blues: The British Connection, Helter Skelter Publishing, London 2002, ISBN 1-900924-41-2 – First edition 1986 – Second edition 1995 Blues in Britain
- Bob Brunning, The Fleetwood Mac Story: Rumours and Lies, Omnibus Press London, 1990 and 1998, ISBN 0-7119-6907-8
- Martin Celmins, Peter Green – Founder of Fleetwood Mac, Sanctuary London, 1995, foreword by B. B. King, ISBN 1-86074-233-5
- Dick Heckstall-Smith, The safest place in the world: A personal history of British Rhythm and blues, 1989 Quartet Books Limited, ISBN 0-7043-2696-5 – Second Edition : Blowing The Blues – Fifty Years Playing The British Blues, 2004, Clear Books, ISBN 1-904555-04-7
- Christopher Hjort, Strange brew: Eric Clapton and the British blues boom, 1965-1970, foreword by John Mayall, Jawbone 2007, ISBN 1-906002-00-2
- Paul Myers, Long John Baldry and the Birth of the British Blues, Vancouver 2007, GreyStone Books, ISBN 1-55365-200-2
- Harry Shapiro, Alexis Korner: The Biography, Bloomsbury Publishing PLC, London 1997, Discography by Mark Troster, ISBN 0-7475-3163-3
- Mike Vernon, The Blue Horizon Story 1965-1970 vol.1, notes from the booklet of the box set (60 pages)
