= Steve Gregory =

English jazz saxophonist (born 1945)

- Steve Gregory in 1966

Background information
- Born: Stephen Gregory; 1945 (age 80–81); London, England
- Instruments: Saxophone; flute

Stephen Gregory (born 1945) is an English jazz saxophonist and composer. He plays tenor, alto, soprano and baritone saxophone as well as the flute.

== Biography and career ==
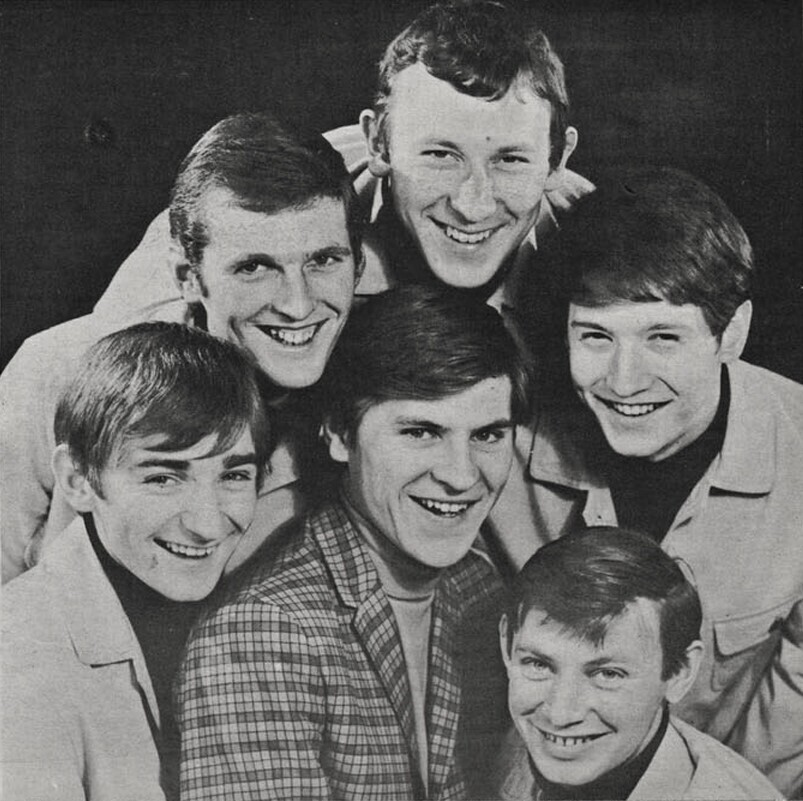
The Alan Price Set in 1966. Clockwise from bottom centre: Alan Price, Roy Mills, Steve Gregory, John Walters, Rod Slade, Clive Burrows.

Gregory was born in London. At St. Paul's School, he learned guitar and piano and played clarinet in the school orchestra. He turned down a place at the prestigious Guildhall School of Music and Drama to become a professional musician. Soon he was playing with the Alan Price Set and was in demand for session work, playing for artists such as Fleetwood Mac (on the second album Mr. Wonderful and early takes of "Need Your Love So Bad"), Ginger Baker's Air Force (on Ginger Baker's Air Force 2), and others. Alongside Bud Beadle, he provided the saxophone for the 1969 hit "Honky Tonk Women" by the Rolling Stones. He also played with Georgie Fame and Geno Washington.

Gregory began to branch out, continuing to play with Georgie Fame but also recording and playing with bands like Ginger Baker's Air Force, Gonzalez, Linda Lewis, Boney M. and Rocky Sharpe and the Replays. Gregory also played saxophone on Andy Fairweather Low's 1975 album La Booga Rooga. He also spent some time in Nigeria, playing with Fela Kuti at his Afrika Shrine.

In the 1980s, Gregory decided to go freelance. He took on television work and continued with session work. In 1984 he played the saxophone on George Michael's hit "Careless Whisper". Michael had already hired and fired several other sax players for the song, who the BBC characterized as struggling to play all the notes with "the right amount of fluidity and still breathe," Michael eventually heard what he was looking for from Gregory. In interview with DJ Danny Sun, Gregory said he was the 9th sax player to attempt the riff and recalled that Michael's secretary had phoned him up at about midday and asked him to give the solo a try.

In the 1980s Gregory also worked with artists such as Bryn Haworth, Chris Rea, Alison Moyet, Freddie King, Maxi Priest, China Crisis, Queen (played solo on "One Year of Love") and Amazulu. He also was member of the 1983/84 world reunion tour of the Animals.

In the 1990s, Gregory played with Wet Wet Wet, Van Morrison, and then joined the Dennis Bovell Dub Band, touring around the world with Linton Kwesi Johnson. He released his first solo album, an acid/jazz/fusion set, Bushfire, on LKJ Records featuring Georgie Fame and John Deacon from Queen.

Gregory occasionally performs with the jazz band Pastiche.

== Discography ==
- Bushfire (1994), LKJ Records (LKJ CD 011)
- Misty (1980, Tan Tan & Steve), Third World Records (TDWD 26)
