= Fleetwood Mac (1968 album) =

Studio album by Fleetwood Mac
- Released: February 1968
- Recorded: 19 April, 9 September, November–December 1967
- Studios: CBS and Decca, London
- Genre: Blues rock
- Length: 35:10
- Label: Blue Horizon
- Producer: Mike Vernon

Fleetwood Mac chronology
Fleetwood Mac (1968)	Mr. Wonderful (1968)

Fleetwood Mac, also known as Peter Green's Fleetwood Mac, is the debut studio album by British blues rock band Fleetwood Mac, released in February 1968. The album is a mixture of blues covers and originals penned by guitarists Peter Green and Jeremy Spencer, who also share the vocal duties. It is the only album by the band without any involvement of keyboardist/vocalist Christine McVie.

The release of the album brought the band overnight success; in the UK Albums Chart, the album reached No. 4 and stayed on the chart for 37 weeks, despite the lack of a hit single. Even though the album has sold over a million copies in the UK, it has never received a certification there. The album barely made the chart in the US, reaching No. 198 in the Billboard 200.

An expanded version of this album was included in the box set The Complete Blue Horizon Sessions.

== Background ==
On 19 April 1967, John Mayall, the frontman of John Mayall & the Bluesbreakers, gave his bandmate Peter Green free studio time at Decca Studios in West Hampstead, London, to use as he wished. Four songs came out of the recording sessions. One of them was an instrumental called "Fleetwood Mac", which was named after the musicians in the rhythm section – Mick Fleetwood and John McVie. The other three songs that were recorded on that day were "First Train Home", "Looking for Somebody", and "No Place to Go". After the session concluded, Green approached Fleetwood and McVie with the idea of forming a new band. Fleetwood, who had been fired from the Bluesbreakers, was willing to join immediately, although McVie was hesitant as he was already earning sufficient income through the Bluesbreakers.

Green advertised in Melody Maker for a bassist; Bob Brunning answered the ad, but contacted the wrong phone number due to a misprint in the newspaper. Undeterred, he reached out to Melody Maker to receive the correct contact information and traveled to west London for his audition. Brunning secured the role as the bassist for Fleetwood Mac on the understanding that he would leave if McVie changed his mind and agreed to join, and was informed by Green that their first performance would be at the Windsor Jazz and Blues Festival.

While searching for new bands to add to the Blue Horizon roster, Mike Vernon had travelled to Lichfield to see a performance by the Levi Set, a band formed by guitarist Jeremy Spencer. Spencer recalled that Vernon was pleased with their performance, which prompted the producer to invite the band to Decca for a recording session. Vernon informed Green of an upcoming Levi Set gig alongside John Mayall's Bluesbreakers and played him some demo tapes from the Levi Set to showcase Spencer's playing. Green subsequently travelled to the Levi Set gig and successfully recruited Spencer for Fleetwood Mac.

== Recording ==
On 9 September, Vernon granted the band access to Decca Studios for a secret recording session late at night unbeknownst to Decca. The songs "I Believe My Time Ain't Long", Rambling Pony" and "Long Grey Mare" emerged from those sessions. Shortly after Fleetwood Mac's live debut, McVie left the Bluesbreakers following Mayall's decision to add a horn section to the lineup. McVie subsequently joined Fleetwood Mac, replacing Brunning, whose bass parts were unused on the final album with the exception of "Long Grey Mare". However, "I Believe My Time Ain't Long" was issued as a non-album single with "Rambling Pony" as its B-side, both of which feature Brunning's bass playing.

On 22 November 1967 the band travelled to CBS Studios on New Bond Street in London, which was situated above a fashion shop. The recording studio had served as a ballroom in the 1900s, and its ceilings were lowered upon its conversion to maintain a more controlled drum sound. While at CBS Studios, Fleetwood Mac recorded "Merry Go Round", "Hellhound on My Trail", "I Loved Another Woman", "Cold Black Night", "The World Keeps on Turning", "Watch Out", "A Fool No More", "You’re So Evil" and "Mean Old Fireman"; several of these songs later appeared on the band's 1968 eponymous release. An additional recording session took place on December 11 that yielded "My Heart Beat Like a Hammer", "Shake Your Moneymaker", and "Leaving Town Blues", although the latter song did not make the album. Most songs required no more than two takes, which the album's audio engineer Mike Ross attributed to Fleetwood Mac's disciplined approach when recording with Vernon, who Ross described as "a strict producer". Vernon recalled that the band's antics were sometimes "infuriating with their persistent 'messing around.'"

The album was recorded on a 4-track machine, with the band connecting directly into the mixing console. According to Ross, Green wanted the album to closely resemble the sound of Fleetwood Mac's stage performances. While Ross preferred for each part to be recorded individually, the band instead recorded their parts live, with Green playing and singing simultaneously. As such, this resulted in spill, which Ross thought contributed to a "roomy sound". Fleetwood Mac sought a rougher sound more akin to the music released by Chess Records; to demonstrate the production they were seeking, the band brought some phonographic records from Chess to play for Ross and Vernon, who ultimately convinced them to abandon this idea.

In an interview with Nick Logan of New Musical Express, Green said that he recorded harmonica parts for several songs on the band's self-titled album, which he largely avoided on their follow-up album Mr. Wonderful. In his 1984 biography of Fleetwood Mac, Steve Clarke reckoned that Green's use of the harmonica on the band's 1968 self-titled album sometimes overshadowed his lead guitar playing. Green's guitar was treated with reverb on "I Loved Another Woman".

== Reception and legacy ==
Professional ratings
Review scores
Source	Rating
About.com	5/5 stars
AllMusic	4.5/5 stars
Rolling Stone	(Positive)
The New Rolling Stone Album Guide	4/5 stars
The Encyclopedia of Popular Music	4/5 stars

The album sold well in the UK, reaching number four on the UK Albums Chart. Upon release, Melody Maker "highly recommended" the album and said that the band played the songs at "white heat intensity." Writing for Rolling Stone, Barry Gifford praised the album, and described it as "potent enough to make the South Side of Chicago take notice". Reviewing the album for New Musical Express, Allen Evans commented that the album had a "nice, relaxed sound" that "combines late-late jazz and exciting blues."

Billboard highlighted the album's "powerful instrumentation" and "gritty, tough blues sound". Cashbox characterised the album as having a "clean, commercial blues sound", with "Long Grey Mare", "Looking For Somebody", and "If I Loved Another Woman" being identified as highlights. Record World thought that the album's original compositions had "an old flavor" to them.

Modern attitudes to the album are also largely positive, and many critics argue the album is one of the highlights of the British blues bloom. TeamRock describes it as a "marvellous debut that established the group as the best British blues band of the day". Writing for Ultimate Classic Rock, Nick DeRiso described the album as a "stellar debut" and "maybe the best album from the British blues boom". He also ranked it as the 4th greatest Fleetwood Mac album. The Telegraph has described the album as a "classic sixties London 12-bar blues rock debut", while also calling it "raw, physical, high spirited and blessed with the exceptional playing of Peter Green". The Encyclopedia of Popular Music describes the album as "seminal". AllMusic noted the influence of Elmore James on Spencer's compositions and wrote that Green's "inspired playing, the capable (if erratic) songwriting, and the general panache of the band as a whole placed them leagues above the overcrowded field."

In 2023, the album received renewed attention after "I'm Coming Home to Stay", a bonus track featured on the 1999 re-release, was used in the third episode of the HBO television series The Last of Us.

== Accolades ==
ThoughtCo. described the album as an "inspired mix of blues covers", and placed it in the top 10 "The Best Blues-Rock Albums of the 1960s". The album was voted number 435 in Colin Larkin's All Time Top 1000 Albums.

== Track listing ==
Side one
No.	Title	Writer(s)	Lead vocals	Length
1.	"My Heart Beat Like a Hammer"	Jeremy Spencer	Jeremy Spencer	2:55
2.	"Merry Go Round"	Peter Green	Peter Green	4:05
3.	"Long Grey Mare"	Green	Green	2:15
4.	"Hellhound on My Trail"	Robert Johnson	Spencer	2:00
5.	"Shake Your Moneymaker"	Elmore James	Spencer	2:55
6.	"Looking for Somebody"	Green	Green	2:50

Side two
No.	Title	Writer(s)	Lead vocals	Length
1.	"No Place to Go"	Chester Burnett	Green	3:20
2.	"My Baby's Good to Me"	Spencer	Spencer	2:50
3.	"I Loved Another Woman"	Green	Green	2:55
4.	"Cold Black Night"	Spencer	Spencer	3:15
5.	"The World Keep on Turning"	Green	Green	2:30
6.	"Got to Move"	James, Marshall Sehorn	Spencer	3:20

=== 1999 re-release ===
No.	Title	Writer(s)	Length
1.	"My Heart Beat Like a Hammer" (Take 2 – master version with studio talk*)	Spencer	3:31
2.	"Merry Go Round" (Take 2 – master version with studio talk/remix*)	Green	4:19
3.	"Long Grey Mare"	Green	2:12
4.	"Hellhound on My Trail" (Take 1 – complete master version/remix*)	Johnson	2:04
5.	"Shake Your Moneymaker" (Master version with studio talk*)	James	3:11
6.	"Looking for Somebody"	Green	2:49
7.	"No Place to Go"	Burnett	3:20
8.	"My Baby's Good to Me"	Spencer	2:49
9.	"I Loved Another Woman"	Green	2:54
10.	"Cold Black Night"	Spencer	3:15
11.	"The World Keep on Turning"	Green	2:27
12.	"Got to Move"	James, Sehorn	3:18
13.	"My Heart Beat Like a Hammer" (Take 1*)	Spencer	3:43
14.	"Merry Go Round" (Take 1 – incomplete*)	Green	0:54
15.	"I Loved Another Woman" (Take 1 – incomplete*, take 2*, take 3 – false start* and take 4 – incomplete*)	Green	6:08
16.	"I Loved Another Woman" (Take 5 – complete master version/remix* and take 6 – incomplete*)	Green	5:08
17.	"Cold Black Night" (Takes 1–5 with false starts, take 6 – complete master version/remix*)	Spencer	5:28
18.	"You're So Evil" (*)	Spencer	3:05
19.	"I'm Coming Home to Stay" (*)	Spencer	2:27

Note

- Asterisk (*) denotes a bonus track.

== Personnel ==
Fleetwood Mac

- Peter Green – vocals, guitar, harmonica
- Jeremy Spencer – vocals, slide guitar, piano
- John McVie – bass guitar on all tracks except "Long Grey Mare", "Hellhound on My Trail" and "The World Keep on Turning"
- Mick Fleetwood – drums on all tracks except on "Hellhound on my Trail" and "The World Keep On Turning"
- Bob Brunning – bass guitar on "Long Grey Mare"

Production

- Mike Vernon – production
- Mike Ross – engineering

== Charts ==
1968 weekly chart performance for Fleetwood Mac
Chart (1968)	Peak position
Finnish Albums (The Official Finnish Charts)	4
UK Albums (Official Charts)	4
US Billboard 200	198
