= Blue Horizon (record label) =

British record label

- Founded: 1965
- Founder: Mike Vernon, Neil Slaven
- Defunct: 1971
- Genre: Blues, independent record label
- Country of origin: United Kingdom

Blue Horizon Records was a British blues independent record label, founded by Mike Vernon and Neil Slaven in 1965, as an adjunct to their fanzine, R&B Monthly, and was the foremost label at the time of the British blues boom in the mid to late 1960s.

== History ==
Blue Horizon's first release was a 45 rpm single by Hubert Sumlin, then working as Howlin' Wolf's guitarist. Other releases soon followed on the Outasite and Purdah labels, the latter of which released just four 7" singles; including "Flapjacks" by Stone's Masonry (featuring Martin Stone, later to join Savoy Brown and Mighty Baby); and the John Mayall and Eric Clapton release "Lonely Years", featuring the B-side, "Bernard Jenkins". Pressings were limited to avoid purchase tax, with estimates for the number of copies of each single issued varying from 99 to 1000.

45 rpm releases continued on the Blue Horizon label, generally reissues of rare and hard-to-find singles from a handful of American blues musicians, although two releases – one by guitarist J.B. Lenoir, and another, by Champion Jack Dupree and British guitarist Tony McPhee – presented new material. Blue Horizon's first album was by one-man band Doctor Ross, recorded in a London hotel room while he was on tour with the 1965 American Folk Blues Festival. A worldwide licensing and distribution deal with CBS, reached late in 1967, heralded the glory years of the label. Starting with two 7" singles with combined CBS/Blue Horizon stamps featuring Peter Green's Fleetwood Mac and Aynsley Dunbar's band, Retaliation, there followed a string of singles and albums by both British and American blues artists, both licensed and newly recorded. The label's second LP, a compilation entitled Let Me Tell You About the Blues, continues to rank among the most collectible vinyls. Some releases featured Mike Vernon produced recordings of US artists, such as Otis Spann and Champion Jack Dupree, backed by British blues players including Peter Green, Paul Kossoff, Stan Webb, Pete Wingfield and Ireland's Rory Gallagher. Other UK artists signed to the label included Chicken Shack, Duster Bennett, Key Largo, Gordon Smith, Jellybread and Christine Perfect (later to be Christine McVie).

The label produced Chicken Shack's 1969 release "I'd Rather Go Blind" and several chart hit singles for Fleetwood Mac, including "Need Your Love So Bad", "Black Magic Woman" and the UK number one hit "Albatross". In the same year, the label linked up with Sire Records in the US. Albums were often housed in imaginative sleeves, mostly designed by Terence Ibbott. The distinctive blue label singles eventually gave way to red and then no-centre white labels as the blues boom died away, although further chart success was realised when "Hocus Pocus" by Dutch band Focus climbed into the UK top 20.

The label ceased production around 1973. Commenting on the label in 1981, Vernon said that "It was a lot of pressure and aggravation, but everybody in those days was out for their own acts so you had to do your best. I still think of it as a really good catalogue. While vinyl re-releases by Sire Records in the US kept interest alive, CD reissues were limited until Vernon himself re-emerged in the 21st century to remaster some of the material. The Fleetwood Mac's sessions for the label were released in 1999 as The Complete Blue Horizon Sessions 1967–1969.

=== Later activity ===
In 2010, it was reported that the label would be reactivated by Seymour Stein and Richard Gottehrer, whom with Mike and Richard Vernon were the US and UK directors of Blue Horizon Records, although it would not have access to the original catalogue. In 2012, Tank Full of Blues by Dion was issued.

On 12 June 2012, BBC Radio 4 broadcast Cerys Matthews' Blue Horizon, a documentary about Blue Horizon Records.

The label was lampooned by The Liverpool Scene with their song, "I've Got These Fleetwood Mac, Chicken Shack, John Mayall Can't Fail Blues".

== See also ==
- List of independent UK record labels
- Chipping Norton Recording Studios

== Bibliography ==
- Bob Brunning, Blues: The British Connection, Helter Skelter Publishing, London 2002, ISBN 1-900924-41-2 – First edition 1986 – Second edition 1995 Blues in Britain
- Bob Brunning, The Fleetwood Mac Story: Rumours and Lies, Omnibus Press London, 1990 and 1998, ISBN 0-7119-6907-8
- Martin Celmins, Peter Green – Founder of Fleetwood Mac, Sanctuary London, 1995, foreword by B. B. King, ISBN 1-86074-233-5
- Dick Heckstall-Smith, The safest place in the world: A personal history of British Rhythm and blues, 1989 Quartet Books Limited, ISBN 0-7043-2696-5 – Second Edition : Blowing The Blues – Fifty Years Playing The British Blues, 2004, Clear Books, ISBN 1-904555-04-7
- Christopher Hjort, Strange brew: Eric Clapton and the British blues boom, 1965-1970, foreword by John Mayall, Jawbone 2007, ISBN 1-906002-00-2
- Paul Myers, Long John Baldry and the Birth of the British Blues, Vancouver 2007, GreyStone Books, ISBN 1-55365-200-2
- Harry Shapiro, Alexis Korner: The Biography, Bloomsbury Publishing PLC, London 1997, Discography by Mark Troster, ISBN 0-7475-3163-3
- Mike Vernon, The Blue Horizon story 1965-1970 vol.1, notes of the booklet of the Box Set (60 pages)
