= Shake Your Moneymaker (song) =

Song first recorded by Elmore James in 1961

Single by Elmore James
- A-side: "Look on Yonder Wall"
- Released: December 1961
- Recorded: June–September 1961
- Studio: J&M (New Orleans, Louisiana)
- Genre: Blues
- Length: 2:30
- Label: Fire
- Songwriter: Elmore James
- Producer: Bobby Robinson

Elmore James singles chronology
"Done Somebody Wrong" (1960)	"Shake Your Moneymaker" (1961)	"Stranger Blues" (1962)

Official audio
- "Shake Your Moneymaker" on YouTube

"Shake Your Moneymaker" or "Shake Your Money Maker" is a song recorded by Elmore James in 1961 that has become one of his best-known pieces. Inspired by earlier songs, it has been interpreted and recorded by several blues and other artists.

"Shake Your Moneymaker" is included on the Rock and Roll Hall of Fame's list of the "500 Songs that Shaped Rock and Roll" and in 2019, the Blues Foundation inducted it into the Blues Hall of Fame as a "Classic of Blues Recording".

== Earlier songs ==
Blues historian Gerard Herzhaft suggests that "Shake Your Moneymaker" is a variation on songs that have been traced back to Charlie Patton (1929 "Shake It and Break It") and Bukka White (1937 "Shake 'Em on Down"). In 1958, Chicago blues singer and harmonica player Shakey Jake Harris recorded "Roll Your Moneymaker" with a band including Magic Sam on guitar and Willie Dixon on bass. The song, a twelve-bar blues with breaks, featured the chorus "roll your moneymaker".

== Elmore James song ==
"Shake Your Moneymaker" is an up-tempo 12-bar blues featuring slide guitar. James frequently repeats the phrase "shake your money maker" throughout the song, but provides little context for the lyrics. The author Peter Silverton believes that they are "a reference [not] to prostitution but to the same nexus of cash and female sexuality that's there in the opening sentence of Pride and Prejudice". (Note: Jane Austen's 1813 novel opens with "It is a truth universally acknowledged, that a single man in possession of good fortune, must be in want of a wife.")

James recorded the song at Cosimo Matassa's J&M Recording Studio in New Orleans, Louisiana in the summer of 1961. James assembled a Mississippi version of his backing band, the Broomdusters, for the recordings: Johnny "Big Moose" Walker on piano, Sammy Lee Bully on bass, and Sam Myers on drums. After one false start, the second take provided the master used for the single. Although several songs were recorded during the session, only "Shake Your Moneymaker" and "Look on Yonder Wall", were released at the time. Fire Records issued the two songs as a single in 1961; it was the last James' single before his death in 1963. As one of his most popular pieces, the song is included on several compilations of his music, such as the box set Elmore James: King of the Slide Guitar (1992, Capricorn Records), The Sky Is Crying: The History of Elmore James (1993, Rhino Entertainment), and Shake Your Money Maker: The Best of the Fire Sessions (2001, Buddha Records).

== Recognition and legacy ==
"Shake Your Moneymaker" became one of James' most well-known songs and a popular dance number. Activist and author James Meredith described witnessing James "working the crowd into a frenzy at Mr. P's, a humble Mississippi juke joint" with the song. The Rock and Roll Hall of Fame included "Shake Your Moneymaker" on its list of the "500 Songs that Shaped Rock and Roll".

The song was recorded by the Paul Butterfield Blues Band for their 1965 debut album, with Elvin Bishop on guitar. In 2019, the Blues Foundation inducted "Shake Your Moneymaker" into the Blues Hall of Fame as a "Classic of Blues Recording". The induction statement describes it as "an exuberant, uptempo departure from slide guitar master Elmore James' deep blues recordings" and notes its popularity among rock musicians, including Fleetwood Mac (1968, Fleetwood Mac), George Thorogood (1988, Born to Be Bad), the Black Crowes with Jimmy Page (1999, Live at the Greek), and Rod Stewart (2013, Time). The Black Crowes named their 1990 debut album after the song. Michael Powers also recorded the song which was included on his Revolutionary Boogie album that was released in 2011.
