= Bob Brunning =

British musician (1943–2011)

- Born: Robert Brunning; 29 June 1943; Bournemouth, England
- Died: 18 October 2011 (aged 68) London, England
- Genres: Blues rock, blues
- Occupations: Musician, teacher
- Instrument: Bass guitar
- Years active: 1967–2011
- Formerly of: Fleetwood Mac, Savoy Brown, Tramp
- Website: www.brunningonline.net

Robert Brunning (29 June 1943 – 18 October 2011) was a British musician and writer who was the original bass guitar player with the blues rock band Fleetwood Mac.

== Career ==
=== Fleetwood Mac ===
When Peter Green left the Bluesbreakers in 1967, he decided to form his own group, naming it Fleetwood Mac after the rhythm section he wanted for the band – Mick Fleetwood and John McVie. Fleetwood joined up straight away, and slide guitar player Jeremy Spencer was recruited, but McVie preferred to stay with the Bluesbreakers, where he was earning a regular wage. In the meantime, Green hired Brunning on a temporary basis, hoping that McVie would change his mind. During this period, Brunning played with Fleetwood Mac at the Windsor Jazz and Blues Festival.

After a few weeks, McVie changed his mind, claiming that Bluesbreakers leader John Mayall was turning too far in the direction of jazz for his liking; hence, McVie joined, and Brunning stood down. Brunning did contribute bass guitar to one track on Fleetwood Mac's debut album Fleetwood Mac, "Long Grey Mare".

=== Savoy Brown and teaching career ===
After his stint in Fleetwood Mac, he joined Savoy Brown before embarking on a career in teaching, training at The College of St. Mark & St. John, Chelsea. His teaching career lasted 30 years and included appointments as the headmaster of Clapham Manor Primary School, Lambeth in the 1980s and Churchill Gardens Primary School, Pimlico in the 1990s. He did not abandon music, however, and played in the Brunning Sunflower Blues Band, Tramp, and later the DeLuxe Blues Band.

In 1972, he played bass guitar on the 22nd Streatham Cub Scouts LP Songs for Your Enjoyment. The album featured folk songs as well as the Scout theme song "Kumbaya".

=== As an author ===
Brunning was an author of many books, and wrote several about Fleetwood Mac, the British blues scene, and music in general. His works about his former group include Behind The Masks, published in 1990, 1998's Fleetwood Mac: The First 30 Years, and The Fleetwood Mac Story: Rumours and Lies.

== Death ==
Brunning died on 18 October 2011, aged 68, after suffering a heart attack at his home in Colliers Wood.
