= Albatross (instrumental) =

- Dutch single reissue: L–R: Kirwan, Green, McVie, Fleetwood (back), Spencer (front)

Single by Fleetwood Mac
- B-side: "Jigsaw Puzzle Blues"
- Released: 22 November 1968
- Recorded: October 1968
- Studio: CBS, London
- Genre: Instrumental rock; exotica; lounge; post-psychedelia; blues
- Length: 3:07
- Label: Blue Horizon (BH 57-3145)
- Songwriter: Peter Green
- Producer: Mike Vernon

Fleetwood Mac singles chronology
"Need Your Love So Bad" (1968)	"Albatross" (1968)	"Man of the World" (1969)

"Albatross" is a guitar-based instrumental by Fleetwood Mac, released as a single in November 1968, later featuring on the compilation albums The Pious Bird of Good Omen (UK) and English Rose (US). The piece was composed by Peter Green and became Fleetwood Mac's only number one single on the UK charts. In 1973, the song was re-issued as a single and reached number two in the UK. Danny Kirwan's instrumental "Jigsaw Puzzle Blues" was chosen for the B-side in most territories.

== Composition ==
Green specifically cited Santo & Johnny's "Sleep Walk" and "The Last Meal" from Eric Clapton's time with John Mayall & the Bluesbreakers as inspirations for "Albatross". He took a liking to the Hawaiian-inspired guitar playing on the song and wanted to instill those stylistic choices into "Albatross" with a "blues feel". Martin Celmins mentioned in Green's biography that an early inspiration for "Albatross" was "a group of notes from an Eric Clapton solo, played slower."

Green said he developed the title for "Albatross" after reading the poem, The Rime of the Ancient Mariner and took further inspiration from the midsection found on the Traffic song, "Hole in My Shoe", which features dialogue from a girl about "climb[ing] on the back of a giant albatross". The composition also resembles Chuck Berry's 1957 instrumental "Deep Feeling", itself derivative of the 1939 recording "Floyd's Guitar Blues" by Andy Kirk and his 12 Clouds of Joy, featuring guitarist Floyd Smith.

Green had been working on the piece for some time before the addition to the band of 18-year-old guitarist Danny Kirwan. According to Green, he wrote parts of the song while on an aeroplane and said that he "composed in the way musicians do, by feeling it out over time". The band's slide guitarist, Jeremy Spencer, was not generally inclined to work with Green, who had felt unable to realise the overall effect that he wanted. With Kirwan's input, who assisted with some of the harmonies, Green completed the piece and it was recorded just two months after Kirwan joined, without Spencer present. Green later commented that "he wouldn't have done 'Albatross' without Danny."

Fleetwood Mac spent two days recording and mixing "Albatross", which was a considerable amount of time to spend on one song according to Mike Vernon, who served as the band's producer. During the first day of the recording session, which occurred on 6 October 1968 at CBS Studios, Mick Fleetwood played his drum kit with timpani mallets, which were then panned to the left and right channels by Mike Ross, who engineered the session. The initial tracking also consisted of John McVie on bass guitar along with Kirwan and Green on guitar. Cymbals and additional guitars were overdubbed the same day after the basic track was established. The bass guitar was also double tracked. Kirwan commented that the band did not approach "Albatross" with the intention of releasing it as a single. He explained that their approach was to record a series of songs and later determine "if there was a single among them", which is what occurred with "Albatross".

This composition is one of only a few tracks by the original line-up of Fleetwood Mac that is included on their later "greatest hits" and "best of" compilations. "Albatross" is the only Fleetwood Mac composition known to have inspired at least two Beatles songs, "Sun King" from 1969's Abbey Road and the single "Don't Let Me Down". George Harrison commented in a 1987 interview that the Beatles used "Albatross" as a starting point to construct a new song. "At the time, 'Albatross' (by Fleetwood Mac) was out, with all the reverb on guitar. So we said, 'Let's be Fleetwood Mac doing Albatross, just to get going.' It never really sounded like Fleetwood Mac... but that was the point of origin."

== Commercial performance ==
Vernon recalled that the instrumental first gained traction when it was played during the end credits of a Top of the Pops segment. CBS had initially attempted to secure the instrumental a place on Top of the Pops, but the program was hesitant to play the instrumental due to their belief that it lacked commercial viability. The program later found an open 45-second slot during the end credits and opted to fill it with an audio clip of "Albatross". The next day, CBS received an influx of orders for the single. Fleetwood Mac was subsequently booked for an interview with Simon Dee, granting the band further exposure, and the instrumental's appearance in a documentary further bolstered its sales numbers. The instrumental was a success in several countries and remains Fleetwood Mac's only number-one hit in the UK Singles Chart, spending one week at the top in January 1969. At its commercial peak, the instrumental was selling 60,000 copies per week.

In a 1970 interview with Record Mirror, Fleetwood commented that the single "altered people's opinions of the band. Before we were more or less a straight blues band, but now people have had to get used to us playing what we feel like – and not necessarily the blues." He also said that the instrumental's success encouraged them to place more attention on releasing singles.

"Albatross" was re-released in the United Kingdom in April 1973 as part of a CBS Records series entitled "Hall of Fame Hits", and enjoyed a second UK chart run, peaking at number 2. Archived footage of the band was aired on Top of the Pops to accompany the audio clip of "Albatross", during which the host mistakenly announced that the band had since broken up.

== Critical reception ==
Writing for New Musical Express, Derek Johnson thought that "Albatross" was a musical departure from the band's previous single, "Need Your Love So Bad". He described "Albatross" as a "slow and brilliantly descriptive instrumental" and a "delicate and technically exemplary guitar duet" that evoked the song "Sleep Walk". Johnson concluded the review by proclaiming that "Albatross" had little chart potential. Following the instrumental's entry into the top ten, Tony Wilson of Melody Maker wrote that the "Albatross" was "a rather surprising hit, being an instrumental and not the familiar heavy blues feel of the Mac's music."

Several publications have included "Albatross" on their lists ranking the best Fleetwood Mac recordings. The Guardian and Paste ranked the instrumental number 12 and number 28 respectively on their lists of the 30 greatest Fleetwood Mac recordings. Alexis Petridis of The Guardian thought that the instrumental's "flawlessly becalmed atmosphere" "transcended it's era" and Matt Mitchell of Paste said that the instrumental was not the "flashiest early Mac song by far, but it's one of the sweetest to revisit." Rolling Stone ranked the instrumental number 19 on their list of the band's 50 greatest recordings.

== B-sides ==
The 1968 B-side to "Albatross" was "Jigsaw Puzzle Blues", a non-album track written by Danny Kirwan. He took inspiration from a clarinet solo played by Jimmy Dorsey on a 1933 composition of the same name written by Eddie Lang and Joe Venuti. Kirwan then repurposed the clarinet solo for guitar and recorded the song on 6 October 1968 at CBS Studios in London, the same day as "Albatross". Green felt that his approach to the song was unsatisfactory and opted not to play on the studio recording.

Similar to "Albatross", Spencer also sat out of the recording sessions for "Jigsaw Puzzle Blues". As such, Kirwan played all of the guitars himself on "Jigsaw Puzzle Blues". John Peel, a disc jockey for BBC Radio 1, opted to play "Jigsaw Puzzle Blues" on his Top Gear radio programme instead of its A-side. Fleetwood Mac's cover of "Need Your Love So Bad" was selected as the B-side for the 1973 re-release of "Albatross".

== Personnel ==
- Peter Green – guitar
- Danny Kirwan – guitar
- John McVie – bass guitar
- Mick Fleetwood – drums

== Charts ==
Chart (1968–1969)	Peak position
Australia (ARIA)	11
Belgium (Ultratop 50 Flanders)	19
Belgium (Ultratop 50 Wallonia)	35
Canadian Singles Chart	45
Canadian AC Chart	16
Ireland (IRMA)	5
Netherlands (Single Top 100)	1
New Zealand (Listener)	2
Norway (VG-lista)	2
Sweden (Sverigetopplistan)	4
Switzerland (Schweizer Hitparade)	4
UK Singles Chart	1
US Billboard Bubbling Under Hot 100 Singles	4
US Cash Box Top 100	98
West Germany (GfK)	19

Chart (1973 UK re-release)	Peak position
Ireland (IRMA)	8
UK Singles Chart	2

Chart (1989 UK re-release)	Peak position
UK Singles Chart	96

Chart (2020–2023)	Peak position
UK Physical Singles Chart	8
UK Singles Downloads (Official Charts)	54
UK Singles Sales Chart	17
UK Vinyl Singles Chart	8

== Certifications ==
Region	Certification	Certified units/sales
New Zealand (RMNZ)	Platinum	30,000^{‡}
United Kingdom (BPI)	Platinum	600,000^{‡}
^{‡} Sales+streaming figures based on certification alone.

== Legacy ==
One of the earliest uses of the tune was on the soundtrack for the Rainer Werner Fassbinder sci-fi virtual reality film World on a Wire (1973). It was featured (along with "Jigsaw Puzzle Blues") in 1979's Rock 'n' Roll High School. Mick Fleetwood told Rolling Stone magazine that it was also used by the BBC on a wildlife program before it was a hit. The piece was also used as the background music to Marks & Spencer's 2005 advertising campaign. The song was used again by Marks & Spencer in 2019.

In March 2005, Q magazine placed "Albatross" at number 37 in its list of the "100 Greatest Guitar Tracks".
