= Harry Pitch =

- Born: Harold Cecil Pitch; 9 May 1925; Hull, East Yorkshire, England
- Origin: London, England
- Died: 15 July 2015 (aged 90) Slough, Berkshire
- Genres: Jazz, pop, soundtracks
- Occupations: Musician, bandleader
- Instruments: Harmonica, trumpet
- Years active: 1940s–2000s

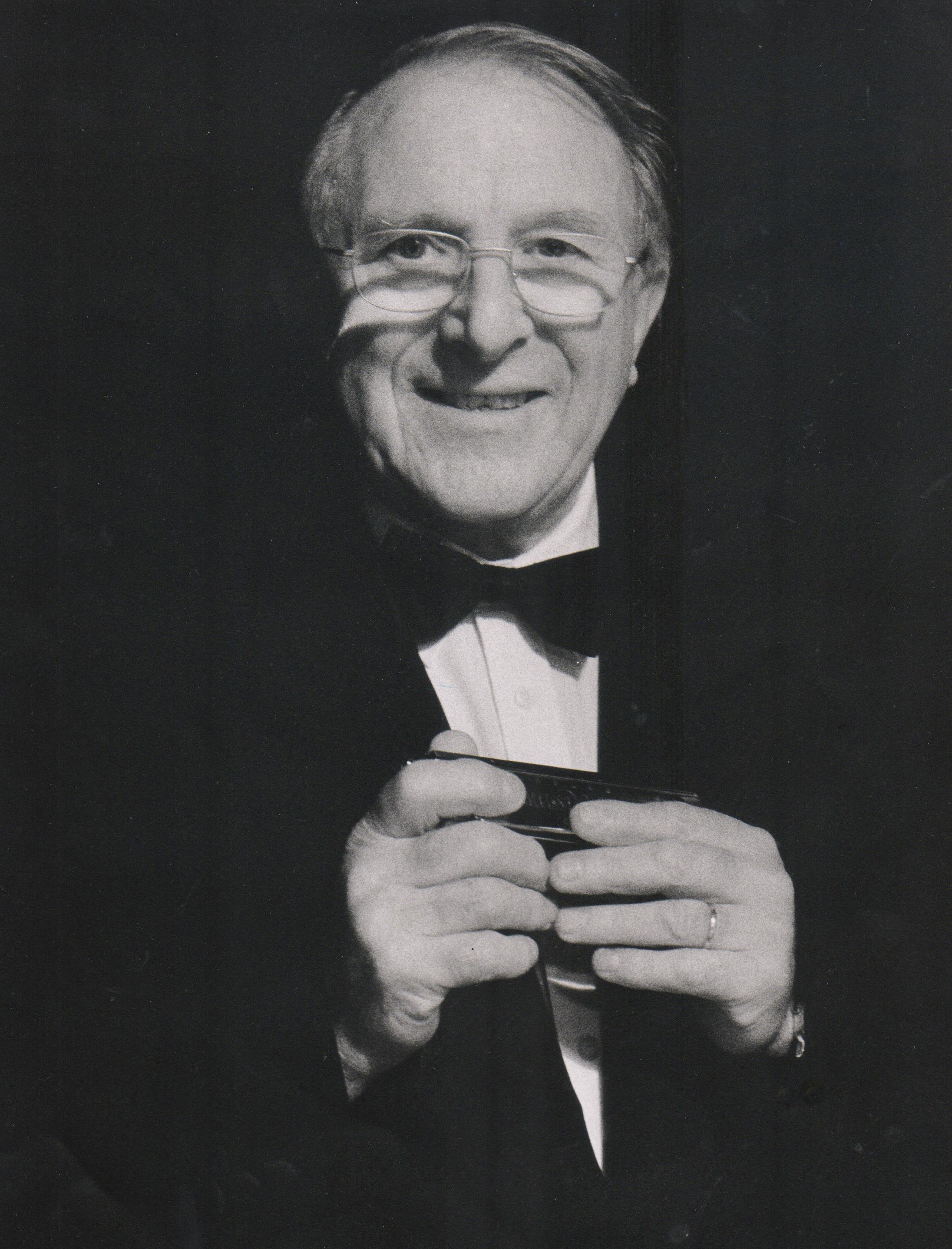
Harry Pitch

Harold Cecil Pitch (9 May 1925 – 15 July 2015) was an English harmonica player who featured on many recordings and soundtracks between the 1950s and 2000s. According to the National Harmonica League, he "was one of the handful of players who have turned harmonica playing into an art form.... [a] player of enormous fluency and invention..". His performance on the theme tune to the television series Last of the Summer Wine in the 1970s is familiar to millions.

== Biography ==
Pitch was born near Kingston upon Hull, East Yorkshire, but grew up in north London, the son of a Polish father whose family name was originally Picz, and a British mother. Inspired by hearing Larry Adler, he bought his first harmonica when in his teens, and after being evacuated to Peterborough in the Second World War also learned the trumpet after harmonicas became scarce. On returning to London, he found work in dance bands and jazz groups, and met other musicians including Geoff Love and Ron Goodwin. He formed his own dance band in north London in the mid-1950s, and played both harmonica and trumpet.

By around 1960, Goodwin, who had become a successful arranger on pop records, began recommending and using Pitch's harmonica on recordings. Pitch quickly established himself as a leading session musician, featuring on Petula Clark's "Sailor" (1961), the Springfields' "Island of Dreams" (1962), and Frank Ifield's "I Remember You" (1962). According to Pitch, he advised John Lennon on harmonica technique in 1962, prior to the Beatles' recording of "Love Me Do". Among the other pop hits that featured Pitch were Val Doonican's "Walk Tall" (1964), Anita Harris's "Just Loving You" (1967), and Mr Bloe’s "Groovin’ With Mr Bloe" (1970).

Pitch also recorded film music, including a harmonica version of Colonel Bogey for Bridge Over the River Kwai, and in the score of Those Magnificent Men in Their Flying Machines, composed and conducted by Ron Goodwin. In later years he was regularly employed by film soundtrack composers including John Barry, James Horner, and Carl Davis. Among his most notable sessions was for the television series Last of the Summer Wine, for which he played the opening theme as well as much incidental music, written by Ronnie Hazelhurst, over most of the series' long run starting in 1973. He also played the theme music for the detective series Shoestring, and recorded many television commercials, including popular ones for Strand cigarettes, Oxo stock cubes and Nestlé’s Milkybar.

He occasionally performed classical works with leading orchestras, and appeared onstage in operas at the Royal Opera House and Sadler's Wells. He moved to Maidenhead in 1977, and in later years, though hampered by hearing loss, he led the Thames Valley Jazzmen, played with "The Bucks, Berks and Oxon Big Band" and formed Rhythm & Reeds with accordion player Jack Emblow. He released several LPs, including Harmonica Jewel Box, The Lonely Harmonicas of Harry Pitch, Bossa Meets Ballads, Harmonically Yours and Harry Pitch with Strings. Pitch was married, with two children. He died in 2015, at the age of 90.
