= Ronald E. J. Milne =

British musician (1921–2014)

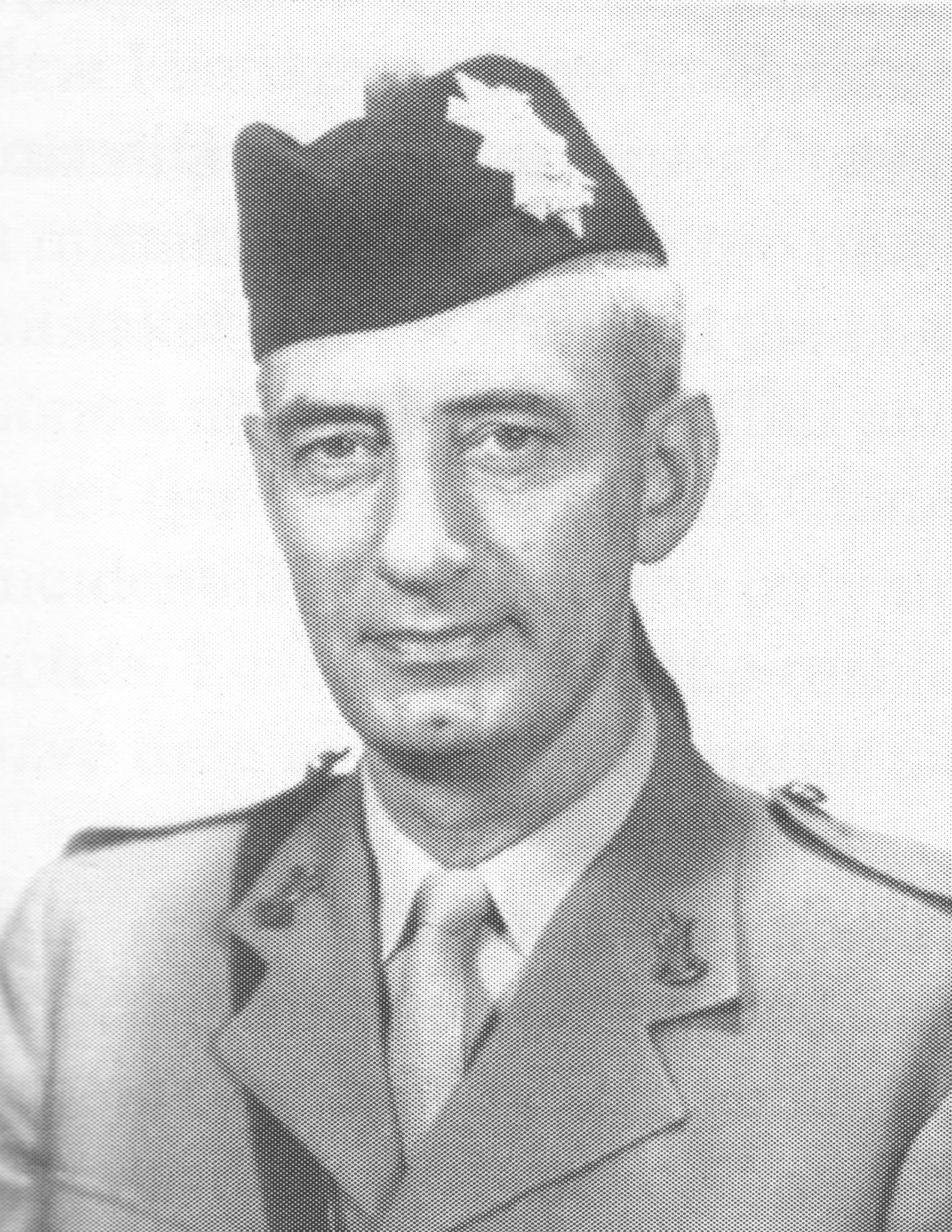

Background information
- Also known as: Ronnie Milne
- Born: Ronald Edwin James Milne; 11 April 1921; Surrey, England, United Kingdom
- Died: 9 February 2014 (aged 92) Ottawa, Ontario, Canada
- Genres: Big band, pop
- Occupations: Singer; band director; musician; composer; musical arranger; music teacher
- Instruments: Viola, trumpet
- Formerly of: The Stargazers
- Military career
- Allegiance: Canada
- Branch: Canadian Armed Forces
- Rank: Captain

(Capt.) Ronald Edwin James Milne (11 April, 1921 – 9 February, 2014) was a British-born singer and band director. He was also a composer and musical arranger who is known for his band arrangements and original compositions. He spent his formative years and the first years of his career in the United Kingdom, when he was widely known as Ronnie Milne. He subsequently auditioned to join the Canadian Army as a musician, was accepted in the rank of sergeant, and immigrated to Canada in 1953.

== Biography ==
=== Early life ===
Milne was born in Surrey, England, and came from a family of musicians, his father at one point playing with the Paris Opera. He left school in 1935 at the age of 14 and, along with his older brother Douglas, joined a juvenile band and toured Britain for several years. In 1939, he enlisted in the Welsh Guards Band, despite his Scottish heritage. In 1942 he won first prize for a jazz composition at the Professional "Jazz Jamboree" for his composition "October Mood", which he later confessed he rather disliked. Milne trained at the Royal College of Music and played viola for some time in the London Symphony Orchestra.

=== The Stargazers ===
Milne came to prominence in 1949 when he co-founded, in conjunction with Cliff Adams, Dick James, and others, the vocal group The Stargazers, which quickly came to enjoy commercial success. The group appeared on such BBC Radio programmes as Workers' Playtime, and its fans included Queen Elizabeth II.

=== Military career ===
Milne moved to live in Canada in 1953. There, he pursued for many years a military career, eventually becoming commissioned as a director of music and known as an arranger of music for band. His "Auprès de ma blonde" continues to be played by many wind ensembles. On the side, he continued to arrange and perform popular music in a non-military context.

The high point of his military career was arguably the Tattoo that took place in 1967 to mark the centenary of the creation of Canada. He was in charge of the music for this event, which concluded with a performance of his "Marche Vanier", a work dedicated to George Vanier, the Governor General who had died just months before. Quoting from the Canadian Armed Forces Tattoo 1967 LP jacket, "Captain R. E. J. Milne, director of music of the Canadian Guards band, emigrated to Canada in 1953 after a distinguished musical career in his native Britain. He was Venturing into more popular forms of music after winning first prize in a jazz-writing competition, he arranged during the 1940s for Britain's big bands - Stanley Black, Geraldo, George Melachrino - and was staff arranger for the Ted Heath Orchestra. Captain Milne also played trumpet in big bands, formed and sang in a vocal group and worked extensively in radio and television in Britain."

After retiring from the Canadian Armed Forces with the rank of Captain, he took up another career as a teacher of string instruments at Nepean High School in Ottawa. He died aged 92 in Ottawa, Ontario, on February 9, 2014.
