= Anita Harris =

English actress and singer (born 1942)

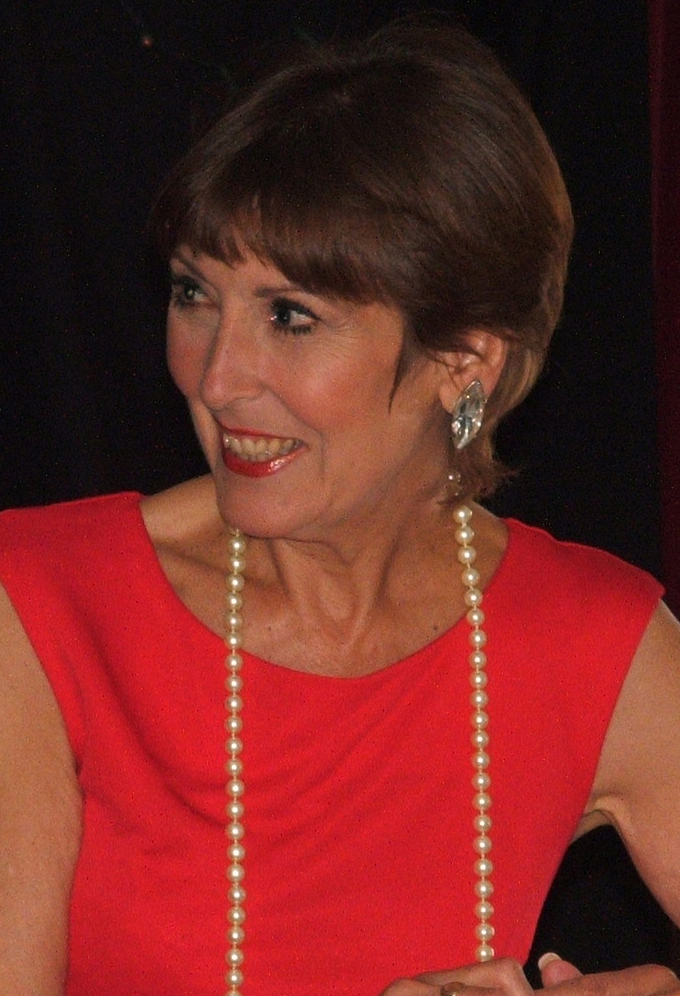
- Born: Anita Madeleine Harris; 3 June 1942 (age 84); Midsomer Norton, Somerset, England
- Occupations: Actress; singer
- Years active: 1960–present
- Spouse: Mike Margolis (m. 1973; died 2023)

Anita Madeleine Harris (born 3 June 1942) is an English actress, singer and entertainer.

Harris sang with the Cliff Adams Singers for three years from 1961 and had a number of chart hits during the 1960s. She appeared in the Carry On films Follow That Camel (1967) and Carry On Doctor (1967).

== Early life and career ==
Harris was born in Somerset; her family moved from Midsomer Norton to Bournemouth when she was seven. She won a talent contest at the age of three. However, it was her penchant for figure skating which led to her performing career: she began skating at the neighbourhood rink, eventually becoming a regular at the Queens Ice Rink in London. Seen by a talent scout shortly before her sixteenth birthday, she was offered a chance to skate in Paris or to travel to Las Vegas, where she would be a dancer in a chorus line. She accepted the latter, and danced at the El Rancho Hotel in Las Vegas. "We did three shows a night and on the 12th night, we had the night off", she said years later.

On returning to the UK in June 1959, she performed in a vocal group known as the Granadiers, and then spent three years with the Cliff Adams Singers. She was still in her teens when John Barry's manager, Tony Lewis, offered her a recording contract with EMI in 1961 and she made her first recordings with the John Barry Seven, a group which was a successful chart act. This first single, a double A-side of "I Haven't Got You", written by Lionel Bart and "Mr One and Only", was issued in October 1961, but did not reach the charts.

Subsequent to their meeting, when they both auditioned for a musical revue, Mike Margolis and Harris formed a personal and professional relationship, marrying in 1973. He became her manager and wrote the songs which served as her second and third singles: "Lies"/"Don't Think About Love" (Vocalion, September 1964) and "Willingly"/"At Last Love" (Decca, February 1965).

In January 1965, she performed at the San Remo Music Festival, although her duet with Beppe Cardile, "L'amore è partito", failed to reach the finals. She made her label debut for Pye Records with the May 1965 release "Trains and Boats and Planes"; however, rival versions by both the song's composer Burt Bacharach (with vocals by the Breakaways) and Billy J. Kramer & the Dakotas eclipsed her recording. She had four subsequent releases on Pye, including the only evident recording of the Burt Bacharach/Hal David composition "London Life".

== Recording artist ==
In 1966, she moved to CBS Records, where her debut release was also her debut album, Somebody's in My Orchard. Her chart breakthrough came in the summer of 1967 with the single "Just Loving You", a Tom Springfield composition which singer Dusty Springfield had suggested her brother give to Harris after the two women had performed on the same episode of Top of the Pops.

Recorded at Olympic Studios in a session produced by Margolis and featuring harmonica virtuoso Harry Pitch, "Just Loving You" had been released in January 1967 but did not reach the UK Top 50 until 29 June 1967. Even after peaking at No. 6 on 26 August 1967, "Just Loving You" remained in the UK Top 40 until the end of the year, and was reported to have accumulated UK sales of 625,000 in six months, Besides charting at No. 18 in Ireland, "Just Loving You" was a Top Ten hit in South Africa, where sales reached 200,000 copies. The disc was released in September 1967 in the United States, where it rose to No. 20 on the "Easy Listening" chart in Billboard and approached the mainstream Pop "Hot 100" chart. It rose no higher than No. 120 on the "Bubbling Under" chart. In January 1968, Harris made her only appearance on the UK album chart when her Just Loving You album reached No. 29.

The sustained interest in "Just Loving You" predicated a mild chart impact for her follow-up single "The Playground", released in September 1967. This reached its chart peak of No. 46 by 28 October 1967, the same week "Just Loving You" (which had dropped out of the Top 20 at No. 21) returned to the Top 20 for three more weeks. However, she did score a substantial hit with her 5 January 1968 release, a remake of the standard "Anniversary Waltz", which spent eight weeks in the UK Top 40, peaking at No. 21.

After just missing the UK Top 50 with the single "We're Going on a Tuppenny Bus Ride" (released 17 May 1968), she made her final chart appearance with her rendition of "Dream a Little Dream of Me". Released on 26 July 1968, her single version peaked in the UK Top 50 at No. 33, whilst the Mama Cass Elliot version peaked at No. 11.

A third album, Cuddly Toy, was released in 1969.

In 2012, she recorded a jazz swing version of "Fairytale of New York" with Ray Dorset, the duet being credited to Mungo Jerry and Anita Harris. It was released as a streaming-only single.

== Television, stage and film career ==
Since 1961, Harris has made numerous television appearances, mostly as a performer, occasionally as an actress, and her few film roles included a cameo as a casino singer in Death Is a Woman (1966) and co-starring roles in the comedy films Follow That Camel (1967) and Carry On Doctor (1967). Harris gained her role in the latter film while working in a revue, Way Out in Piccadilly with Frankie Howerd. Backstage, he introduced her to the producer and director of the series, resulting in the decision to cast Harris as well as Howerd. In December 1970, Thames Television debuted the children's television series Jumbleland, which she co-produced and in which she starred as Witch Witt Witty.

Harris worked with magician David Nixon for eight years in the 1970s. She appeared on the Morecambe and Wise Show in 1971 and 1973. In 1981, she was in the line-up for the Royal Variety Performance, and sang "Burlington Bertie from Bow". This performance was reprised at the Queen Mother's 90th birthday celebration at the London Palladium, in 1990, in the presence of the Queen, Princess Margaret and the Duke of Edinburgh in a large company of artistes presenting music hall, featuring many well known television and stage personalities. The same tribute to the star she had presented several times on the BBC's variety show, The Good Old Days. She was the subject of This Is Your Life on 6 January 1982, having been surprised by Eamonn Andrews at London's Talk of the Town. Other television appearances up to 2001 included Boom Boom: The Best of the Original Basil Brush Show, French & Saunders and Bob Monkhouse: A BAFTA Tribute.

From the early 1970s, Harris toured in several editions of her one-woman stage show which, as Anita Harris in the Act!, was broadcast in 1981. It was essentially a recording of her performance at the Talk of the Town. In 1982, she was named Concert Cabaret Performer of the Year by the Variety Club of Great Britain. Whilst a frequent star of pantomime over the years, she made a debut in legitimate theatre in 1986 when she assumed the role of Grizabella in the West End production of Cats for a two-year tenure, with subsequent credits including Bell, Book and Candle, Deathtrap, Seven Deadly Sins Four Deadly Sinners, Verdict and the stage dramatisations of House of Stairs and My Cousin Rachel. Additionally, she co-starred with Alex Ferns, Will Thorp, Colin Baker and Leah Bracknell in the UK tour of the stage adaptation of Strangers on a Train in 2006. She portrayed Gertrude Lawrence in G and I at the New End Theatre in the spring of 2009. In 2010 she starred with Brian Capron in the UK national tour of Stepping Out; having previously played the leading role of Mavis, she now took on the part of Vera. She toured with a new one-woman stage show: An Intimate Evening With Anita Harris in 2013 and appeared in a production of the Emlyn Williams play A Murder Has Been Arranged at the Grand Theatre, Wolverhampton, in July 2013 and at Malvern Festival Theatre in August of that year.

In 2014, Harris appeared in a guest role in the BBC drama, Casualty. She continues to perform with her band around the country, including at the Royal Albert Hall, London. She performed in pantomime over Christmas 2014–15, appearing as the wicked Baroness in a production of Cinderella at the Grand Opera House in York. "I've played Aladdin, Jack and Dick Whittington and Robinson Crusoe. I've loved playing principal boy and I'm sorry that boys are now playing that role", she told a York press meeting at the time.

During 2016, Harris toured with her show, An Evening with Anita Harris, across the UK. With musical accompaniment, she shared anecdotes from her life in showbusiness, the people she has met and the places she has been. She also appeared in ITV's Last Laugh in Vegas, and was a contestant in the BBC's Celebrity MasterChef 2018.

In 2019, Harris guest starred in the first episode of Series 20 of Midsomer Murders, entitled "The Ghost of Causton Abbey" as Irene Taylor, an accomplice to the killer. She guest starred as a medium called Shyanna in an episode of EastEnders which aired in August 2019.

Harris starred in the UK tour of Cabaret, alongside John Partridge, from August 2019 to early 2020.

== Filmography ==
=== Film ===
| Year | Title | Role | Notes |
|---|---|---|---|
| 1966 | Death Is a Woman | Singer at the Casino | Minor Role |
| 1967 | Follow that Camel | Corktip | Main Role |
| 1967 | Carry on Doctor | Nurse Clarke | Main Role |
| 2016 | People are Messy | Gran | Supporting Role |

=== Television ===
| Year | Title | Role | Notes |
|---|---|---|---|
| 1959–1964 | One O'Clock Show | Various | Recurring Roles |
| 1965 | Who Is Mary Morison? | Marie | TV film |
| 1966 | Hope and Keen | Various | Episode: "Tropicsville" |
| 1966 | The New Forest Rustlers | Maureen | 3 episodes |
| 1967 | The Dick Emery Show | Anita Harris | 2 episodes |
| 1969 | Cinderella | Cinderella | TV film |
| 1970 | Scott On... | Various | 3 episodes |
| 1970–1971 | Jumbleland | Witch Witty | All episodes |
| 1973 | Christmas Pantomime | Robin Hood | TV film |
| 1980 | ITV Sunday Night Drama | Beatrice Lillie | Episode: "Remember Jack Buchanan" |
| 1982 | West Country Tales | The Woman | Episode: "The Breakdown" |
| 1986 | Christmas Night of One Hundred Stars | Aladdin | TV film |
| 1994 | French and Saunders | Anita Harris | Episode: "French and Saunders Christmas Carol" |
| 2009 | The Casebooks of Verity Lake | Verity Lake | TV pilot |
| 2015 | Casualty | Francesca Hayward | Episode: "Something Borrowed, Something Blue" |
| 2018 | Midsomer Murders | Irene Taylor | Episode: "The Ghost of Causton Abbey" |
| 2019 | EastEnders | Shyanna | Episode: "Episode dated 26 August 2019" |

== Discography ==
=== Singles ===
- "I Haven't Got You" / "Mr. One and Only" (Parlophone R 4830) – 1961
- "Lies" / "Don't Think About Love" (Vocalion V 9223) – 1964
- "Willingly" / "At Last Love" (Decca F 12082) – 1965
- "Trains and Boats and Planes" / "Upside Down" (Pye 7N 15868) – 1965
- "I Don't Know Anymore" / "When I Look at You" (Pye 7N 15894) – 1965
- "London Life" / "I Run to Hide" (Pye 7N 15971) – 1965
- "Something Must Be Done" / "Funny Kind of Feeling" (Pye 7N 17069) – 1966
- "Just Loving You" / "Butterfly With Coloured Wings" (CBS 2724) – 1967 – UK No.6 / US Easy Listening No.20 / US Pop No.120
- "The Playground" / "B.A.D. For Me" (CBS 2991) – 1967 – UK No.46
- "Anniversary Waltz" / "Old Queenie Cole" (CBS 3211) – 1968 – UK No.21
- "We're Going on a Tuppenny Bus Ride" / "Artie" (CBS 3468) – 1968
- "Dream a Little Dream of Me" / "The Flying Machine" (CBS 3637) – 1968 – UK No.33
- "Le Blon" / "Dusty Road" (CBS 3765) – 1968
- "Loving You" / "Ferdinand and His One Man Band" (CBS 4157) – 1969
- "I'll Never Fall in Love Again" / "Love is Everywhere" (CBS 4467) – 1969
- "The Only One To Love Me" / "When You Were A Child" (CBS 4845) – 1970
- "Jumbleland" / "Late Night Final" (CBS 5377) – 1970
- "Genesis" / "Put on a Little Music" (Columbia DB 8846) – 1971
- "I Just Need a Lover" / "Music" (Brut Productions 45-1345) – 1971
- "You and I" / "Captain Biscuit" (Columbia DB 8962) – 1972

=== Albums ===
- Somebody's in My Orchard (CBS BPG 62894) – 1966
- Just Loving You (CBS SBPG 63182) – 1967 – UK No.29
- Anita Harris (Marble Arch MAL 761) – 1968
- Cuddly Toy (CBS 63927) – 1969
- Anita in Jumbleland (CBS 64258) – 1970
- Anita is Peter (Golden Hour GH 590) – 1974
- Love To Sing (Warwick WW 5015) – 1976
- The Best of Anita Harris (CBS Embassy 31615) - 1977
- Feelings (Chevron CHVL 117) – 1979
- A Taste of Honey (Columbia 484104 2) - 1996
- The Essential Anita Harris (Right Recordings RIGHT021) – 2003 – compilation album

=== EPs ===
- Nursery Rhymes For Our Times (CBS 6359) – 1967
- Anita Harris (Pye NEP 24288) – 1967
- Dream a Little Dream of Me (CBS 6401) – 1968

== See also ==
- UK Singles Chart records
- List of performances on Top of the Pops

== Sources ==
- Ross, Robert (1998) [1996]. The Carry On Companion. London: Batsford. ISBN 0-7134-8439-X.
