= Regulation of nicotine marketing =

Regulations regarding the advertising of nicotine-containing products

Enforcement of bans on tobacco advertising

As nicotine is highly addictive, marketing nicotine-containing products is regulated in most jurisdictions. Regulations include bans and regulation of certain types of advertising, and requirements for counter-advertising of facts generally not included in ads (generally, information about health effects, including addiction). Regulation is circumvented using less-regulated media, such as Facebook, less-regulated nicotine delivery products, such as e-cigarettes, and less-regulated ad types, such as industry ads which claim to discourage nicotine addiction but seem, according to independent studies, to promote teen nicotine use.

As marketing has shifted toward digital media and social platforms, newer nicotine-delivery products such as e-cigarettes and nicotine pouches, have increasingly been promoted in ways that fall outside the scope of traditional broadcast or outdoor advertising regulations. Studies from several countries have found associations between youth exposure to such marketing and increased curiosity or susceptibility toward trying nicotine products.

However, researchers emphasize that these findings reflect associations observed in cross-sectional or survey-based analyses; they do not by themselves establish that marketing exposure causes product use, as multiple social and behavioural factors influence experimentation among adolescents.

Use of nicotine pouches increased from 1.5% to 1.8% in the same period.

Among youth who reported vaping, nearly nine in ten indicated that they used flavoured products.

U.S. federal health agencies note that longer-term declines in youth tobacco use reflect the combined effects of policy changes, such as raising the minimum legal sales age to 21 (Tobacco 21), strengthened enforcement, targeted public-health campaigns, and evolving product regulation.

Recent surveillance data from the United States show that current e-cigarette use among middle and high school students declined from 7.7% (approximately 2.13 million students) in 2023 to 5.9% (about 1.63 million) in 2024.

== Advertising restrictions ==
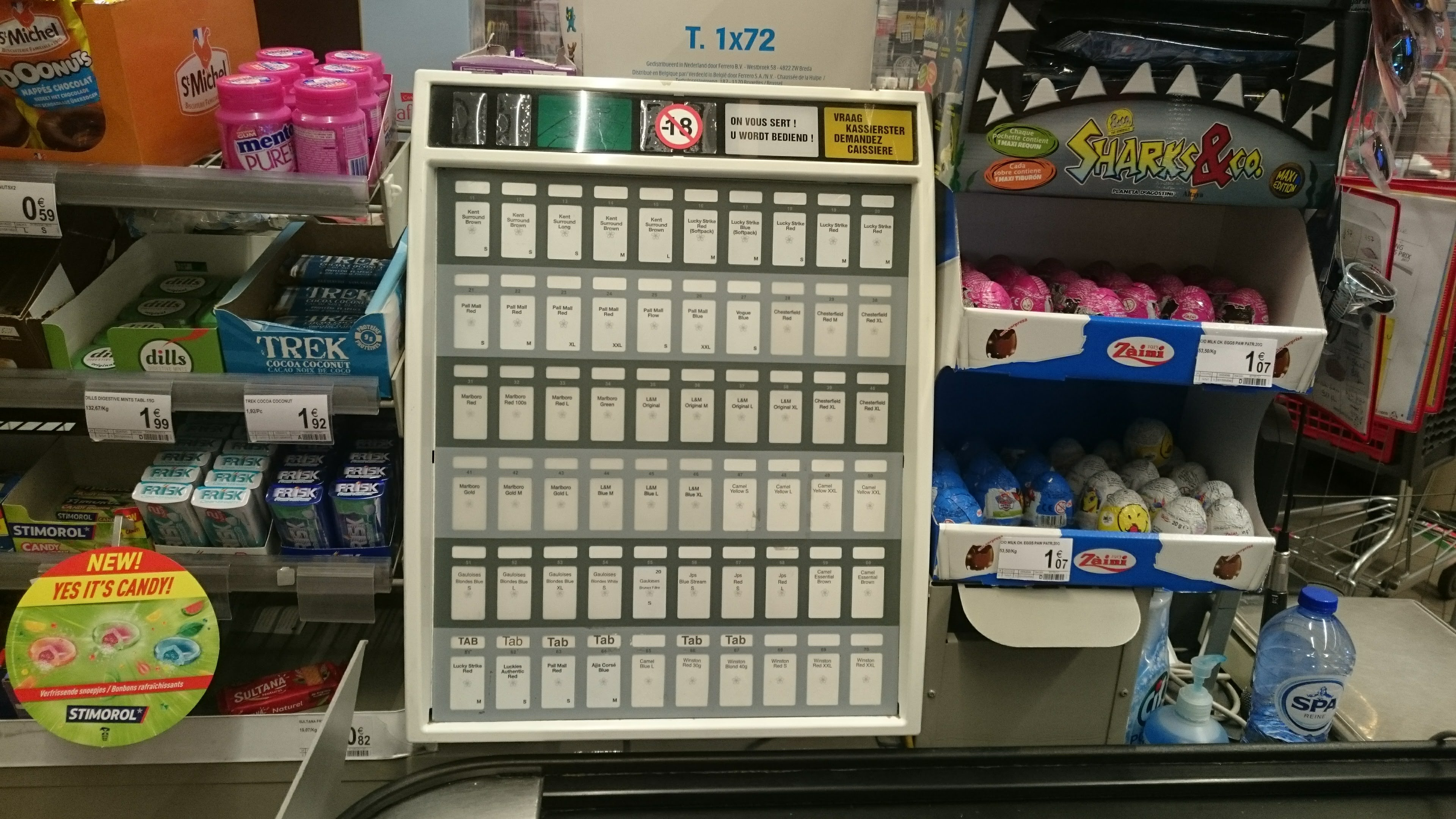
Tobacco distributor in Belgium after the introduction of plain packaging (April 2020)

Advertising restrictions typically shift advertising spending to unrestricted media. Banned on television, ads move to print; banned in all conventional media, ads shift to sponsorships; banned as in-store advertising and packaging, advertising shifts to shill (undisclosed) marketing reps, sponsored online content, viral marketing, and other stealth marketing techniques.

Another method of evading restrictions is to sell less-regulated nicotine products instead of the ones for which advertising is more regulated. For instance, while TV ads of cigarettes are banned in the United States, similar TV ads of e-cigarettes are not. However, in 2019 several major broadcasting groups, including CBS, WarnerMedia, and Viacom, announced that they would voluntarily cease accepting e-cigarette commercials, substantially reducing their presence on national television despite the absence of a federal ban.

Between 2020 and 2022, seven countries implemented comprehensive bans on tobaccos advertising, promotion and sponsorship, extending full advertising ban coverage (including point-of-sale) to additional 246 million people; by 2022 around 5.6 billion people (71 per cent of the global population) were protected by at least one MPOWER measure, with bans on advertising, promotion and sponsorship the areas of greatest recent progress.

Nevertheless, the WHO Regional Office estimates that about 78 per cent of students aged 13–15 worldwide report being regularly exposed to some form of tobacco advertising, promotion or sponsorship. Other contemporary research including research from the National Youth Tobacco Survey, covering 2014-2020 indicates that adolescents in the United States continue to report high exposure to e-cigarette marketing, particularly via social-media platforms and other online media.

The most effective media are usually banned first, meaning advertisers need to spend more money to advertise to the same number of people. Comprehensive bans can make it impossible to effectively substitute other forms of advertising, leading to actual falls in consumption. However, skillful use of allowed media can increase advertising exposure; the exposure of U.S. children to nicotine advertising is increasing as of 2018.

Advertising types are described in order of increasing regulation below.

=== "Harm reduction" advertising ===
Some tobacco companies have sponsored ads that claim to discourage teen smoking. Such ads are unregulated. However, these ads have been shown, in independent studies, to increase the self-reported likelihood that teens will start smoking. They also cause adults to see tobacco companies as more responsible and less in need of regulation. Unlike promotional ads, tobacco companies do not track the effects of these ads themselves. These ads differ from independently produced antismoking ads in that they do not mention the health effects of smoking, and present smoking as exclusively an "adult choice", undesirable "if you're a teen".

Tobacco companies have also funded "anti-smoking" groups. One such organization, funded by Lorillard, enters into exclusive sponsorship agreements with sports organisations. This means that no other anti-smoking campaigns are allowed to be involved with the sporting organisation. Such sponsorships have been criticised by health groups.

There is more exposure to industry-sponsored "antismoking" ads than to antismoking ads run by public health agencies.

=== User-created content ===
With the restrictions placed on general advertising and sponsorship, tobacco companies have moved to new promotions to establish new customers and maintain existing ones. For example, Altria, known formerly as Philip Morris Companies, has a strategy of growth by "promotions that build brand equity through adult consumer experiences". The intent is to reinforce brand loyalty by building consumer communities.

Unpaid content on Facebook, created and sponsored by tobacco companies, is widely used to advertise nicotine-containing products, with photos of the products, "buy now" buttons and a lack of age restrictions, in contravention of ineffectively enforced Facebook policies.

Another example is Marlboro's "Outwit the West", a "by-invitation if you're a smoker" four-member team-based 'competition' with a series of cryptic brain teasers. The top twenty teams get invited to the Marlboro ranch, a location where it's "okay to smoke" and food, drinks and activities are paid for by the company. The team with the most correct answers shares a one million dollar prize. Thousands of teams participate.

More generally, Marlboro has been using its mailing database (estimated at 26 million in 2005) to promote directly with giveaways and general invitations to the Marlboro Ranch. Reinforcement is provided by branded products and by peers.

The EPC Cigar Company launched a social networking and internet campaign to market cigars in 2010.

=== Merchandise ===
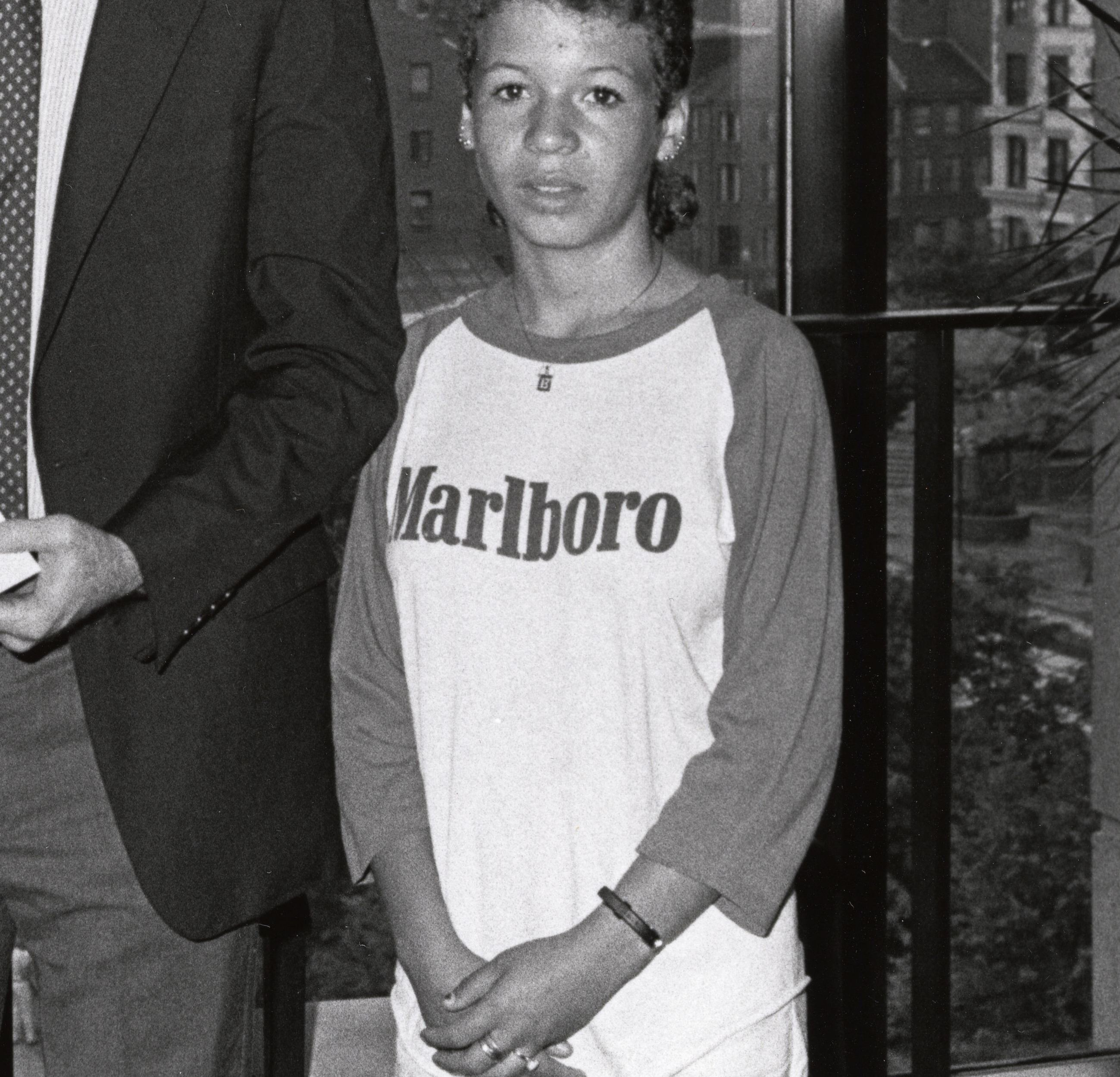
Young girl wearing a Marlboro shirt in the 1980s

Owning tobacco-branded merchandise is a risk factor for addiction. Its sale and display has therefore been restricted in some jurisdictions.

Some mini motorcycles have a cigarette or other tobacco trademark applied; such branded mini-motorcycles have been found in New Zealand in breach of tobacco advertising legislation.

=== Sponsorship ===
Sponsorship has widely been used to circumvent bans on conventional advertising. Sponsors benefit from placing their advertising at sporting events, naming events after themselves, and recruiting political support from sporting agencies.

==== Movies ====
Nicotine use is frequently shown in movies, historically often in return for six-figure (US$) sponsorship deals. More money is paid for a star actor to be shown using nicotine. Smokers in movies are generally healthier, more successful, and younger than actual smokers. Health effects, including coughing and addiction, are shown or mentioned in only a few percent of cases, and are less likely to be mentioned in films targeted at younger viewers.

The U.S. Cigarette Advertising and Promotion Code incorporated a voluntary ban on paid cigarette product placement circa 1991, and the 1998 Master Settlement Agreement banned the practice in the US, but this does not seem to have had an effect on the appearances of cigarettes in American movies. In 2003, some tobacco companies agreed to request that their brands not be used in film depictions of smoking, after a request from the California Attorney General. There have been calls for more restrictive ratings for films that show tobacco, and prefacing films showing tobacco use with mandatory health information ads. These have been opposed by members of the tobacco industry.

The Russian parliament banned non-essential smoking scenes in movies in 2001. The Indian government announced a ban on tobacco use and ads in Indian movies and TV in 2005, but backed down after lobbying by the film industry and the Information and Broadcasting Ministry.

Voluntary self-regulation is typically used as a last resort to deter government regulation. Universal Pictures has a "Policy Regarding Tobacco Depictions in Films". In films anticipated to be released in the United States with a G, PG or PG-13 rating, smoking incidents (depiction of tobacco smoking, tobacco-related signage or paraphernalia) appear only when there is a substantial reason for doing so. In that case, the film is released with a health warning in end credits, DVD packaging, etc.

Since May 2007, the Motion Picture Association of America may give a film glamorizing smoking or depicting pervasive smoking outside of a historic or other mitigating context a higher rating.

There have also been moves to reduce the depiction of protagonists smoking in television shows, especially those aimed at children. For example, Ted Turner took steps to remove or edit scenes that depict characters in cartoons such as Tom and Jerry, The Flintstones and Scooby-Doo, which are shown on his Cartoon Network and Boomerang television channels.

Video game content rating systems have also looked at the usage of tobacco in video games; a video game depicting the use of tobacco may have a higher rating.

The practice of tobacco movie sponsorship was satirized in the movie Thank You for Smoking.

==== Formula One auto racing ====
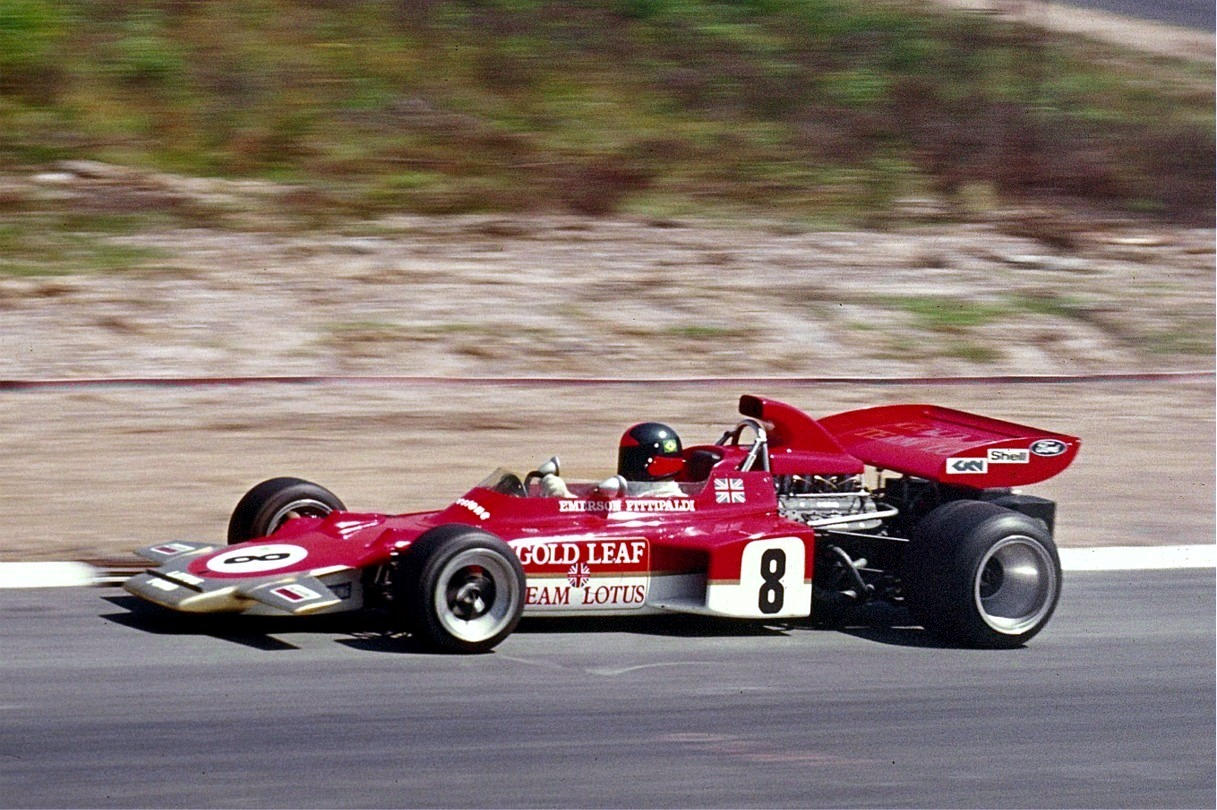
Gold Leaf-sponsored Lotus from 1971

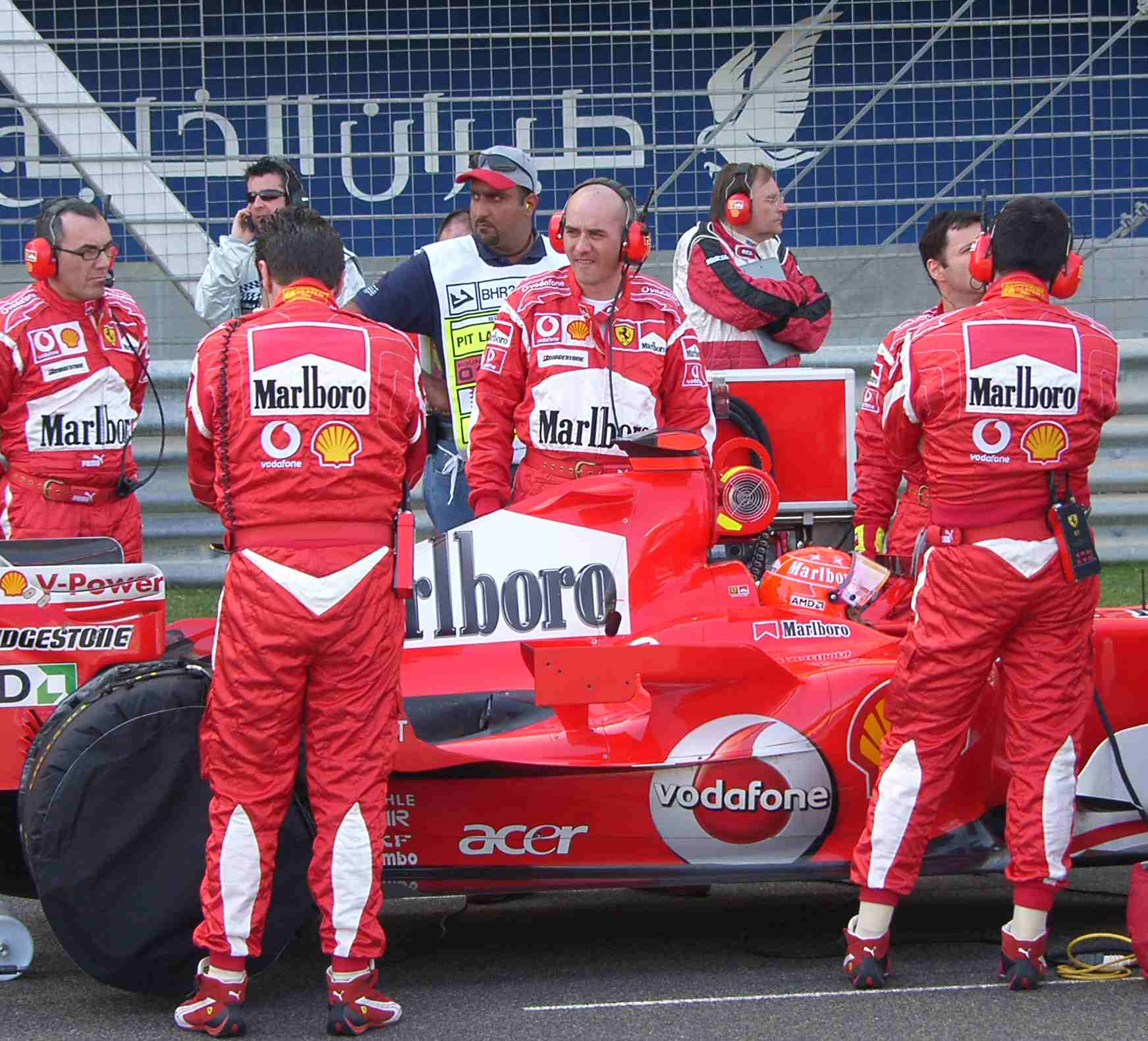
Marlboro sponsored Ferrari (photo from the 2006 Bahrain Grand Prix).

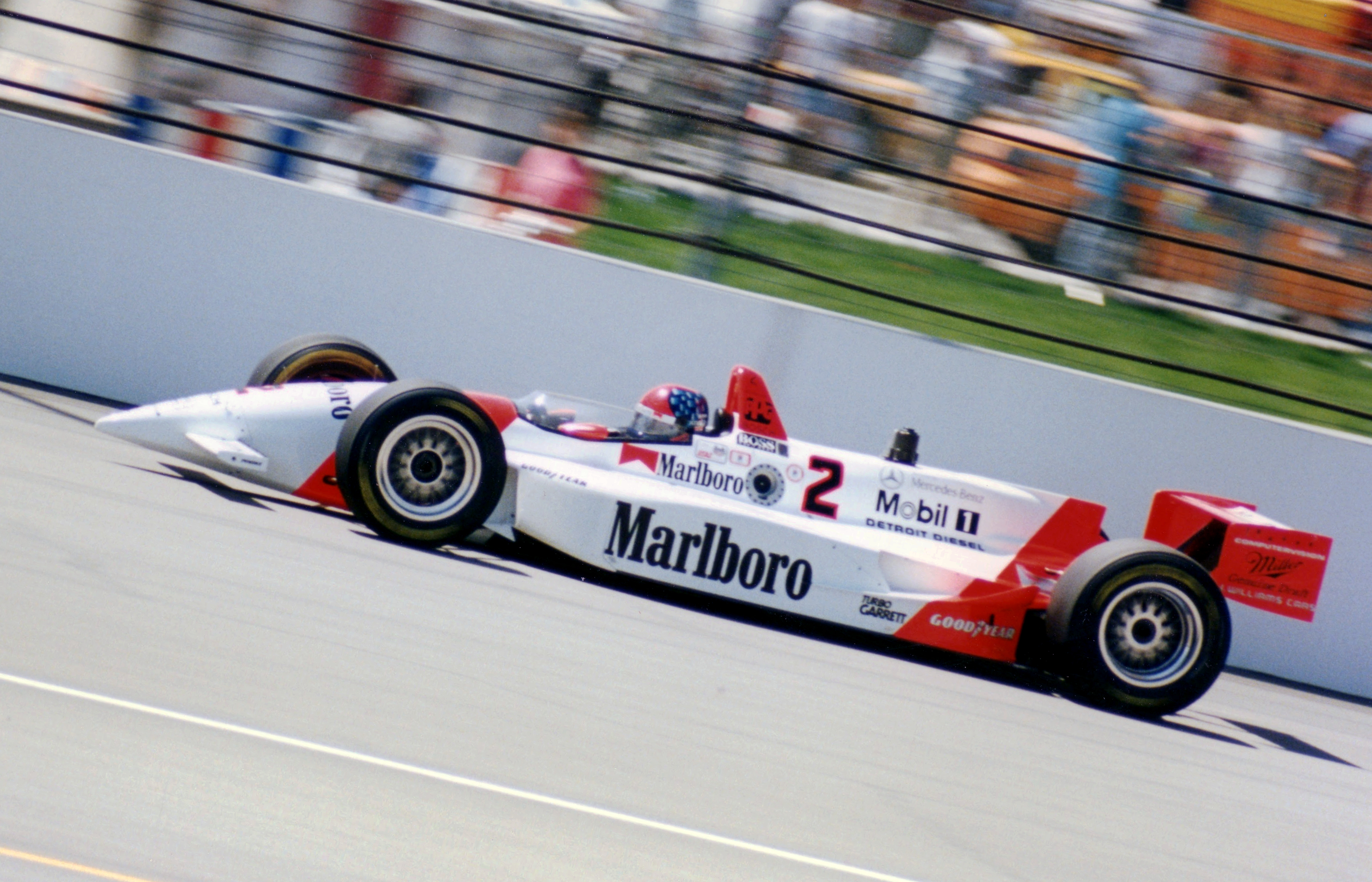
A Team Penske Marlboro-sponsored car in 1994

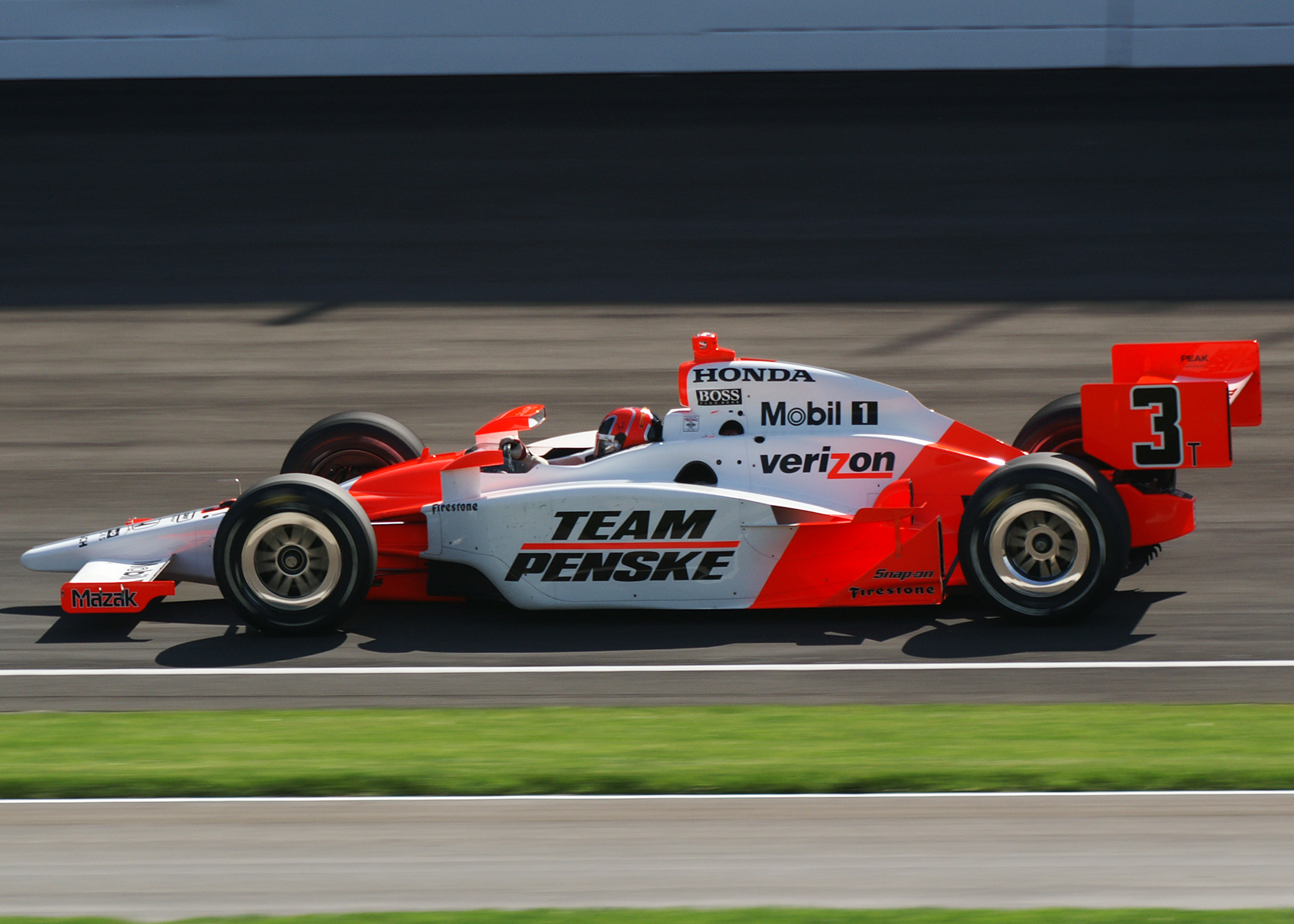
A Team Penske Verizon-sponsored car in 2009, with an unbranded Marlboro scheme

Ever since the first appearance of the Red, Gold and White colors of the Imperial Tobacco's Gold Leaf brand sponsorship livery at the 1968 Monaco Grand Prix, teams, drivers and circuits of Formula One (F1) for years had been heavily dependent on the financial backing of sponsors and from the arrival of Gold Leaf for many decades the tobacco industry played a major role in sponsoring the sport. In 1973, West Germany began a trend in outlawing tobacco sponsorships in motor races, followed by the United Kingdom in 1980, starting with major races and outlawing the rest of the sponsorships in later years. In 1993 France did the same. As anti-smoking legislation began to tighten in many parts of the world F1 became an even more important opportunity for cigarette brand promotion. The negotiating skills of the F1 leadership (especially Bernie Ecclestone) were such that in many jurisdictions F1 achieved some exemptions from the rules. However, there is now a blanket ban on advertising in the European Union (Directive 2003/33/EC), and the cars are not allowed to show any links with the tobacco companies. As a result, tobacco advertising started to exit F1. In 2000, Williams became the first major team to run without tobacco sponsorship, and McLaren later replaced the West brand and no longer have any tobacco sponsors. Renault ended the deal with Mild Seven after the 2006 season, and in the same year British American Tobacco, owners of British American Racing team, withdrew from F1, selling the team to Honda. Ferrari on the other hand renewed their arrangements with Philip Morris in 2005 and later in 2011.

Through the arrangement, the Marlboro brand in 2007 was legally visible prominently on the cars, jumpsuits and pit crew at three races: at the Bahrain, Monaco and Chinese Grands Prix. Ferrari was the only team backed by a cigarette brand in the 2007 Formula One season. Since the start of the 2008 season, Ferrari has no longer carried Marlboro logos at any races, even those at which tobacco advertising is allowed. It is therefore unlikely that any F1 car will ever directly advertise tobacco again. However the barcode symbol that was used for some time was "subliminally" suggestive of the Marlboro branding, and signified their sponsorship. For part of 2010 and onwards, Ferrari no longer had the barcode symbol; the only signification of sponsorship was the team name, Scuderia Ferrari Marlboro, although the team's logo showed the left side of the Marlboro chevron. However, from the 2011 British Grand Prix, Ferrari dropped the Marlboro sponsor from their official name, and reverted to the name Scuderia Ferrari as their official name, due to ongoing pressure from people against tobacco sponsorship.

Sponsorship from the tobacco industry still exists in the sport as of 2021. Ferrari's title sponsor Mission Winnow is a wholly owned subsidiary of Philip Morris (the owner of Marlboro) and McLaren is sponsored by A Better Tomorrow, an initiative by British American Tobacco. Both teams and companies claim these partnerships have nothing to do with tobacco or nicotine products. Critics argue however, that the sponsorships are just a form of subliminal advertising to bypass strict regulation. In 2021, Ferrari removed Mission Winnow from its title name and livery for the Grands Prix in the European Union, likely due to the bans on tobacco advertising. Before Phillip Morris/Mission Winnow dropped their sponsorship of the team before the start of the 2022 Formula One World Championship.

BAT's sponsorship on McLaren were less interrupted than Philip Morris's Mission Winnow case, as BAT expand their branding on McLaren since 2020, including advertising their alternative products such as Velo nicotine pouches and Vuse vapes.

==== IndyCar auto racing ====
After a brief stint as the title sponsor for the USAC Championship Trail in 1971, Marlboro joined the sport of Indy car racing in 1986.

The "Marlboro chevron" livery first appeared on the car of Emerson Fittipaldi during the 1986 CART season and 1986 Indianapolis 500. Patrick Racing expanded the sponsorship to two cars in 1987, and in 1990, it moved to the Penske Team. The white and red Marlboro livery became one of the most recognized in the sport, and Marlboro increased their participation by providing title sponsorship for individual races (Marlboro 500, Marlboro Grand Prix, and Marlboro Challenge), contingency and ancillary sponsorships, and bonus awards programs (Marlboro Million). The company also provided extensive ticket promotions and hosted large hospitality engagements at races.

Penske's cars were painted in the full Marlboro livery through 2009, and the team adopted the moniker "Marlboro Team Penske". The paint schemes remained largely consistent, with only slight variations over the years, namely a reduction of brand lettering size in the final few years. Penske carried the sponsorship over to the Indy Racing League starting in 2002. In international CART and IRL events where tobacco advertising was banned, as well as IRL races in 2001, and in the final two seasons of their sponsorship in 2008-09 (because of MSA restrictions), the cars kept the Marlboro colors but sported either the "barcode" livery, generic "Team Penske" logos, or simply blank sidepods.

Other major tobacco sponsors in the sport during the 1980s through 2000s included Players Ltd., KOOL, and Hollywood. Smokeless tobacco companies also sponsored several entries, with Foyt in a long-term association with Copenhagen, and Skoal also appearing on cars during the 1980s.

At least two support series events from series not usually paired with an open-wheel series ejected drivers for being underage under the MSA. During the CART 2001 Marlboro 500, NASCAR Craftsman Truck Series driver Kyle Busch was ejected from that series' paddock at the California Speedway for being underage (16), as the CART race that weekend featured Marlboro, Kool, and Player's sponsorships.

In 2008, the Sears Auto Center 150 USAR Hooters ProCup North race at The Milwaukee Mile, which some NASCAR teams use for driver development, was held during the IndyCar race at The Milwaukee Mile. As such, five drivers under the age of 18, most notably Joey Coulter and 2011 Daytona 500 champion Trevor Bayne, both of whom eventually won in NASCAR's national series, were forced to sit out the round as the Penske cars in the IndyCar feature carried unbranded Marlboro sponsorship. USAR, the sanctioning body of the event, asked the prohibited drivers to participate in the Thursday test before IndyCar arrived, and allowed an age-legal driver to qualify the car and race, provided they start at the rear of the field. The prohibited drivers would score points for the weekend.

The end of tobacco advertising also permitted INDYCAR to allow the Star Mazda Championship to be permitted alongside the IZOD IndyCar Series in 2010, as that series requires a minimum age of 16 (no drivers under 18 are permitted in any support series under tobacco regulations).

==== NASCAR auto racing ====
NASCAR's top series, the NASCAR Grand National Series, found sponsorship from R. J. Reynolds Tobacco Company (RJR) in the early 1970s following the United States ban on television advertising of cigarettes. The "Winston Cup" became the title of the series, and later, some other regional series under NASCAR were also sponsored by the tobacco company (for example, the "Winston West" series). In the mid-1970s, some races began to get partial television coverage, frequently on the ABC sports variety show, Wide World of Sports. While Winston was not able to do commercial advertisements, their name was all over television during races.

Over the many years of their relationship with NASCAR, Winston sponsored several races and prize programs including the Winston 500, The Winston all-star race, the Winston Western 500 and the 1985–1997 Winston Million, which awarded a million dollars to a driver who could win a "small slam" of the sport's four Grand Slam events in the same year. From 1998 to 2002, the Winston No Bull 5, a more complex award system, was used. Each year, there were five races (initially the four majors and Indianapolis) selected to be a part of this promotion. Each driver who finished in the top 5 in the previous No Bull 5 race was eligible to win in the next race selected, along with a fan. If one of the eligible drivers won that race, they were awarded with a million dollar bonus.

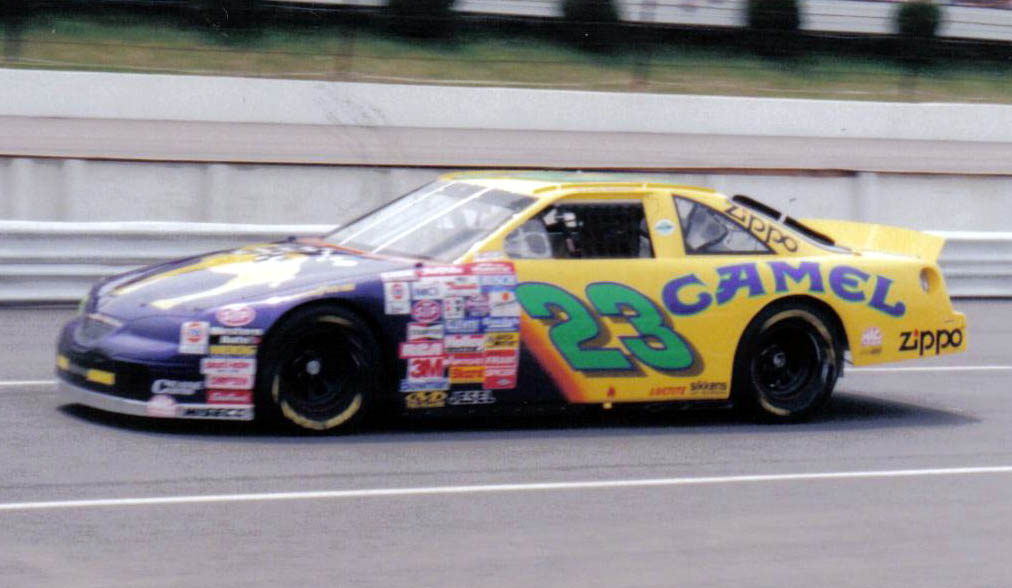
Jimmy Spencer's RJR-sponsored Camel Ford in 1997

In addition, R. J. Reynolds sponsored its own car for three years with Camel colors. It was driven by Jimmy Spencer.

On 5 February 2003, R. J. Reynolds informed NASCAR that their five-year extension to sponsor NASCAR's premier division signed in July 2002 could be dissolved because of economic concerns at the company.

On 19 June 2003, NASCAR announced at the NASDAQ MarketSite a new deal with Nextel Communications starting in the 2004 season, as the familiar red was replaced with Nextel yellow (Nextel's new colors were announced after the deal had been signed) and by the end of the first season, it was acquired by Sprint. Starting in September 2005, NASCAR began replacing Nextel logos with Sprint logos started appearing in reference to the new sponsor.

When the advertising was rebranded with the Sprint banner, the Turn 11 bridge at Watkins Glen International was rebranded, with new Sprint advertising featuring the tagline "Sprint ahead".

Smaller tobacco companies not covered by the Master Settlement Agreement have attempted sponsorship for portions of the season or circuits. Bailey's, a small tobacco company based in Virginia, featured in 2005 sponsorship of selected races for the Bobby Hamilton Racing team based in Tennessee, and has been the longtime sponsor of the Bailey's 300 at Martinsville Speedway for late model race cars in the region which race at NASCAR-sanctioned tracks.

After the Kyle Busch incident during the CART Marlboro 500, in order to comply with the Master Settlement Agreement, NASCAR was forced to implement a minimum age of 18 in 2002 for the three national series, as they were often paired with each other or other national motorsport series at race meets.

The rules also allowed support series (now the ARCA Menards Series East and West) to participate with national series once tobacco was removed, as 15 year old drivers are eligible in those series, which now race exclusively on shorter circuits. In 2013, with tobacco all but out of North American motorsport, NASCAR changed the minimum age to 16 in the Truck Series for any circuit 1.25 miles or shorter, along with road courses, similar to rules in regional series. Two drivers, Chase Elliott and Erik Jones, won at 17 years of age in 2013. Cole Custer, 16, won in 2014. The second-tier series, the NASCAR O'Reilly Auto Parts Series, followed suit in 2026 with a minimum age of 17 at the shorter circuits.

===== Nicorette tobacco cessation product sponsorship =====
In 2005, GlaxoSmithKline, manufacturer of Goody's Headache Powder, a NASCAR sponsor since 1977, expanded their long-term sponsorship by adding their Nicorette brand of smoking cessation product as a NASCAR official sponsor, and signed with Chip Ganassi Racing and also longtime Goody's Headache Powder (another GSK brand) spokesman and former smoker, Richard Petty would lead their "Commit to Quit" program.

GSK changed its marketing program in 2006, moving to other brands with Ganassi Racing, while Jeff Gordon became GSK's Nicorette leader, with a Nicorette car for two races.

==== Snooker ====
Snooker was badly hit by the British ban on tobacco sponsorship, with several tournaments losing their financial backers. These included:

- The World Snooker Championship (Embassy, 1976–2005)
- The Masters (Benson & Hedges, 1975–2003)
- The Welsh Open (Regal), 1992–2003
- The Scottish Open (Regal), 1998–2003
- The Regal Masters, 1989–2002

The World Snooker Championship was given special dispensation from the European Union directive until 2005. The Masters went without any sponsorship in 2004, before receiving the backing of Rileys Club the following year. Some players spoke out against the ban, worried that the game would not be able to survive without the financial backing of the tobacco companies.

==== Other sports ====
Various sports have relied on sponsorship money from tobacco companies, both for the participants and for competitions. In the United Kingdom, tobacco companies moved into the expanding world of sports sponsorship on a major scale after television advertising of cigarettes was banned in 1965, with the intent of getting round the ban and gaining a de facto free plug for a mass TV audience.

- Cricket (Benson and Hedges Cup)
- Darts (Embassy World Championship)
- Golf: The Canadian Women's Open was sponsored from 1972 to 2000 by Imperial Tobacco Canada by the Du Maurier and Peter Jackson brands.
- Association football (soccer): The R. J. Reynolds Tobacco Company sponsored the 1982 and 1986 FIFA World Cup, with the Winston and Camel brands, respectively.
- Women's tennis: Virginia Slims
- Rugby league: The Silk Cut Rugby League Challenge Cup, the Regal Trophy, the Winfield Cup
- MotoGP (including Marlboro Ducati and also the Rizla Suzuki; Rizla+ is a tobacco paper manufacturer owned by Imperial Tobacco and is exempt from tobacco advertising bans because they only produce the paper, not the tobacco itself)
- Skiing: The award given to Canada's top male skier was known as the Export A Cup. Its 1983 winner, Steve Podborski, became one of the first athletes to protest tobacco sponsorship of sport when he refused to accept his award in said event.
- Horse racing: Many races in the UK in the 1960s, 1970s and into the 1980s were sponsored by tobacco companies, notably what is now the Juddmonte International Stakes, which was originally the Benson & Hedges Gold Cup when founded in 1972.
- Monster truck: From 1990 until 1993, the United States Hot Rod Association's mud racing and monster truck racing series were known as the Camel Mud and Monster Series. The events were later re-branded under its current name, Monster Jam.
- NHRA: Winston Drag Racing. Sponsored by Coca-Cola since 2002.
- IMSA: Camel GT & Camel Lights

== Advertising bans by country ==
The European Union and World Health Organization (WHO) have both specified that the advertising of tobacco should not be allowed, including "traditional media (print, television and radio) and all media platforms, including Internet, mobile telephones and other new technologies as well as films.", retail display, tobacco packaging, internet sales and brand stretching and sharing in which the tobacco brand is displayed on, or in some way connected to non-tobacco products. Tobacco depictions in media should lack identifiable tobacco brands, the media should be age-rated appropriately and state that tobacco is harmful. The WHO Framework Convention on Tobacco Control, which came into effect on 27 February 2005, has been ratified or acceded to by 183 Parties, covering more than 90 per cent of the world's population. Under Article 13 of the treaty, Parties are obliged to implement comprehensive bans or restrictions on tobacco advertising, promotion and sponsorship, subject to their constitutional arrangements.

In February 2024, at the Conference of the Parties to the WHO Framework Convention on Tobacco Control tenth session in Panama City, specific guidelines were adopted for the implementation of Article 13 to address cross-border tobacco advertising, promotion and sponsorship, including digital media, and the depiction of tobacco in entertainment media.

=== Africa ===
In several low- and middle-income countries, tobacco-control legislation aligned with the WHO Framework Convention on Tobacco Control has prompted direct engagement by transnational tobacco companies during regulatory consultations and law-making. These interactions have included submissions opposing or seeking to weaken restrictions on tobacco advertising, promotion, sponsorship and, in some cases, product flavors. Reported examples include industry correspondence from the Zambian subsidiary of British American Tobacco to government ministers in 2025, during consideration of a draft tobacco control bill that proposed expanded restrictions. Similar lobbying efforts have been documented in other African and Asian markets.

==== South Africa ====
In South Africa, the Tobacco Products Control Amendment Act was passed in 1999. This act bans all advertising and promotion of tobacco products, including sponsorship and free distribution of tobacco products.

==== Zimbabwe ====
In Zimbabwe, tobacco advertising is still permitted on national television.

=== Asia ===
==== Bangladesh ====
Bangladesh became a Party to the WHO Framework Convention on Tobacco Control on 27 February 2005.

In Bangladesh, tobacco advertising is prohibited in all print and electronic media, including at the point-of-sale. Free and discounted tobacco products are prohibited, but internet tobacco sales and tobacco products bearing non-tobacco brand names are allowed. Although sponsorship by the tobacco industry is not completely prohibited, publicity of the sponsorship is prohibited.

==== Hong Kong ====
Tobacco advertising on Hong Kong television was outlawed on 1 December 1990, when the territory was still a British colony. However, some sporting events were still allowed to be sponsored by tobacco companies until it was abandoned by the government in July 1999. It took some years before it was removed from buses and trams until it was completely banned in November 2009.

==== Indonesia ====
In Indonesia, tobacco advertising is still allowed, but showing the cigarette packaging and smoking activities is outlawed. Broadcast of tobacco advertising on Indonesian television is only allowed from 9:30 pm until 5:00 am local time. Warnings on cigarette packaging are shown, as of 2018 old warning was replaced by "Because smoking, I suffered throat cancer" (Indonesian: Karena merokok, saya terkena kanker tenggorokan). Recent warnings also include 18+ signs and a quitline.

In 2014, the Indonesian government halted the branding of cigarettes as "light", "mild", "ultra light", "extra mild", "low tar", "slim", "special", "full flavour" or "premium" on all smoking packages and has decided to place graphic images on the cigarette packs to show the adverse long-term effects of excessive smoking. However, this rule does not affect many cigarette brands such as L.A. Lights, A Mild, Djarum Black Slim, Dunhill Filter, and Win Mild Premium; that previously used such descriptors continued to be marketed without relabeling due to pre-existing trademarks and branding conventions.

In 2024, the government raised the minimum legal age to purchase cigarettes from 18 to 21, prohibited the sale of single cigarettes, banned the sale of conventional and electronic cigarettes within 200 metres of schools and playgrounds, and imposed tighter controls on online sales. The regulation also introduced stronger sanctions for advertising violations, with advertising provisions scheduled to take effect two years after the regulation was signed.

==== Malaysia ====
In Malaysia, the displaying of cigarette packets in advertisements with a general warning on long-time smoking that came into effect in June 1976 has been banned since 1995. However, this has not stopped tobacco companies from advertising their products. There are also restrictions on tobacco advertising after the ban of displaying of cigarette packaging, print media advertising is restricted to only one page and advertising on television should not be more than 15 seconds. They have found ways to continue to build their brands by using brand names for a bistro and cybercafes such as Benson & Hedges Bistro and Sampoerna A International Cyberworld, for stationery, accessories, clothing like Dunhill, Marlboro Classics, Davidoff, Perilly's, Pall Mall, John Player Specials, Winfield and Winston. Tobacco companies also sponsor holiday tours like Mild Seven Seafarers Club, Peter Stuyvesant Travel and Tours, Kent Holidays and Salem Holidays as well as concerts and entertainment events. All of these are indirect advertising strategies employed by tobacco companies. Tobacco advertising continued without the display of cigarette packaging until January 2003, when the Malaysian federal government banned even such indirect advertising of tobacco brands, except in certain establishments licensed to sell tobacco products. Formula One Grand Prix and other sporting events are still allowed to use tobacco sponsorship. In 2009, Malaysian government halted the branding of cigarettes as "light" or "mild" on all smoking packages and has decided to place graphic images on the cigarette packs to show the adverse long-term effects of excessive smoking.

==== Pakistan ====
In 2002, the Pakistani government restricted tobacco advertising in all media; point-of-sale advertising is still legal, but there are some restrictions regarding size. Some cigarette companies used to provide free cigarettes to patrons of tobacco shops; that, too, was forbidden in the 2010 regulations. The government have also banned the sale of tobacco to underage people in an effort to crack down on underage smoking.

==== Philippines ====
In the Philippines, tobacco advertising is still allowed but is now limited to point-of-sale and sari-sari store advertising and promotions in other establishments like restaurants, bars, and in select billiard halls. Websites that feature tobacco (like Marlboro) are only limited to smokers 18 years old and above, and minors are not allowed to visit the website.

Until 30 June 2008, tobacco advertising was shown on television, radio, print media, movie theaters, billboards and even sponsoring events. Many cigarette brands were created and advertised and some are remembered for their jingles and slogans. Most of the advertisements aired on television have portrayed young males almost smoking with the filter tip already in the lips and ready for smoking by lighting up with a lighter, leading to concerns by parents over their children mimicking the actions shown in the advertisements above.

However, when Republic Act 9211, or the "Act Regulating the Packaging, Use, Sale Distribution and Advertisements of Tobacco Products and for Other Purposes" was passed on 23 June 2003 by President Gloria Macapagal Arroyo, tobacco advertising became limited starting on 1 January 2007. Between 1 July 1993 and 30 June 2008, all tobacco advertising was required to display a health warning by the government indicating that "Cigarette smoking is dangerous to your health" (it is continued for other areas not affected by the ban and on cigarette packaging before 3 March 2016, which was replaced by graphic health warnings). Television (including Philippine cable channels, whether broadcasting foreign or local content, particularly during news and public affairs programs) and radio stations would not air tobacco advertising from 7 a.m. to 7 p.m. local time (before R.A. 9211 was passed, it was from 7 a.m. to 5 p.m.), with similar restrictions also implemented in cinemas showing G, PG-13, and R-13 rated movies. Advertising tobacco in print media is now only permitted in material aimed at men 18 years old and above, mostly in men's magazines and newspapers.

Because of the R.A. 9211 being passed, there was a timescale on tobacco advertisements being banned.

| Date | What was banned |
|---|---|
| 1 January 2007 | Television (including cable & satellite) and radio advertisements |
| 1 July 2007 | Movie theater and outdoor advertising |
| 1 July 2008 | Print media and sponsorship of events like concerts and sporting events |

The R.A. 9211 also restricts advertising on public vehicles like taxis, buses, and even the Philippine National Railways, Manila Metro Rail Transit System (MRT), and the Manila Light Rail Transit System (LRT) (buses, MRT and the LRT are most common with wrap advertising) and also banned cartoon characters in tobacco advertising that might affect children (like Joe Camel, which was popular in the U.S. and European countries before it was forbidden; it is still unclear if this cartoon character went into advertising in the Philippines before the R.A. 9211 was passed). The law also prevents celebrities from endorsing tobacco products in advertising; before the R.A. 9211, actors Richard Gomez and the late Rudy Fernandez had promoted a cigarette brand.

==== Singapore ====
In Singapore, tobacco advertising was completely banned on 1 March 2007, whereby all kinds of advertising in newspapers and magazines was strictly prohibited, under the Prohibition of Advertisements relating to Smoking Act, 1970. Tobacco advertisements on radio, television, and on neon signs ceased on 1 January 2003, after which only anti-smoking slogans were permitted to be broadcast on television and radio. With the ban on tobacco advertisements for the purpose of anti-smoking, the Ministry of Culture had appealed to coffee shops, hotels, restaurants, canteens, snack bars, and bars to cooperate with the government to remove all posters, signs, and other forms of advertisements relating to smoking. A Smoking Advertisement Unit was set up by the Ministry, and officers were located in areas that had any type of tobacco advertisement within the few months before the blanket ban on tobacco advertising kicked off on 1 March 1971. Twenty-one years later, in 1992, cigarette advertising in foreign magazines was banned in Singapore.

Singapore similarly requires cigarette manufacturers to print images of mouths, feet, and blood vessels adversely affected by smoking.

==== Taiwan ====
Article 9 of Taiwan's Tobacco Hazards Prevention Act prohibits any form of advertising for any form of tobacco product. Taiwan also prohibits other forms of tobacco promotion, such as "using tobacco products as gift or prize for the sale of other products or for the promotion of other events", or "packaging tobacco products together with other products for sale". Depending on the specific violation, Article 26 penalizes violators with fines ranging from NTD 100,000 to NTD 2,500,000 for each violation.

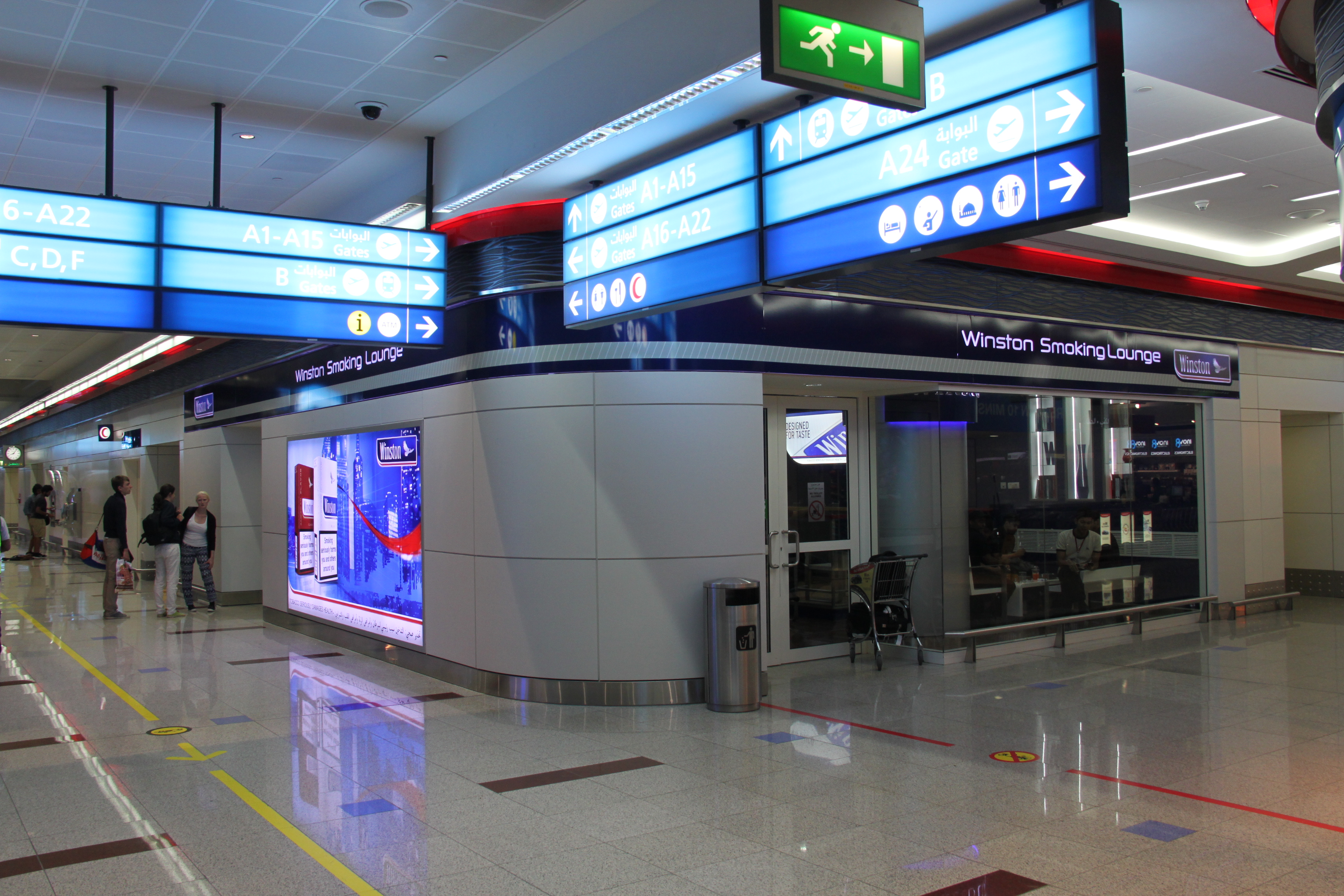
A Winston sponsored smoking room at Dubai International Airport in August 2014

==== United Arab Emirates ====
In the United Arab Emirates, tobacco advertisements are forbidden under federal anti-tobacco law No 15 of 2009, effective from 21 January 2014.

=== Europe ===
All tobacco advertising and sponsorship on television has been banned within the European Union since 1991 under the Television Without Frontiers Directive (1989). This ban was extended by the Tobacco Advertising Directive, which took effect in July 2005 to cover other forms of media such as the internet, print media, radio, and sports events like F1. The directive does not include advertising in cinemas and on billboards or using merchandising – or tobacco sponsorship of cultural and sporting events which are purely local, with participants coming from only one member state as these fall outside the jurisdiction of the European Commission. However, most member states have transposed the directive with national laws that are wider in scope than the directive and cover local advertising. A 2008 European Commission report concluded that the directive had been successfully transposed into national law in all EU member states, and that these laws were well implemented.

In 2003, the European Union halted the use of descriptors such as "light" or "mild", saying that such terms could mislead consumers about the dangers of smoking. Stark health warnings such as "Smoking Kills" initially covered at least 30% of the front and 40% of the back of each packet, with larger areas applied where multiple national languages were used. These requirements were subsequently strengthened under Directive 2014/40/EU of the European Parliament and of the Council, which entered into force on 19 May 2014 and became applicable in Member States from 20 May 2016. The Directive mandates combined text-and-picture health warnings covering 65% of the front and back surfaces of the cigarette and roll-your-own tobacco packaging. Directive 2014/40/EU also introduced provisions regulating the marketing of electronic cigarettes and refill containers. Member States are required to restrict or prohibit most forms of commercial communication and sponsorship for these products, and cross-border advertising and promotion – including audiovisual commercial communications – are prohibited within the European Union.

Within the European Union, many European countries have adopted or are implementing prohibitions or severe restrictions on outdoor billboard advertising of tobacco and nicotine-containing products under national laws aligned with the Tobacco Advertising Directive and related measures.

Some nations, including the UK and Australia, have begun anti-smoking advertisements to counter the effects of tobacco advertising.

In Ukraine, tobacco advertising "in all printed mass media" has been illegal since 1 January 2010.

Some countries, like Finland and Greece, had outlawed tobacco advertising on television and radio prior to the ban in 1991.

==== France ====
As a result of the enactment of the 2016 plain tobacco packaging bill, France became the second country in the world in January 2017, after Australia, to require tobacco products to be sold in plain packaging.

In France, a decree published in September 2025 bans the manufacture, importation, distribution, sale and possession of oral nicotine pouches (and similar forms) from March 2026.

==== Germany ====
Germany's national legislation phased a complete ban on outdoor tobacco advertising for combustible cigarettes from 2022, for heated tobacco products from 2023, and for e-cigarettes from 2024, following approval from the Bundestag in 2020.

==== Ireland ====
Tobacco advertising on radio, television and billboards is illegal. In July 2000 the Irish government stopped advertising and sponsorship by the tobacco industry. In July 2009, in-store tobacco advertising and displays of tobacco were made illegal – Ireland being the first country in the EU (and third in the world, after Canada and Iceland) to do so. With effect from 30 September 2017, the Public Health (Standardised Packaging of Tobacco) Regulations 2017 (S.I. No. 422/2017) required that all tobacco products made for sale bear standardised ('plain') packaging; non-compliant stock produced prior to that date was permitted a sell-through period up to 30 September 2018. The standardised packaging required the removal of all branding and promotional design elements, limiting packs to prescribed colours, shapes, and typefaces, with trademarks and logos prohibited. The requirements applied to packaging intended for retail sale, while wholesale-only packaging not visible to consumers was exempt.

==== Italy ====
In Italy, advertising of tobacco products has been banned since 1962, though ad in magazines remained legal since the late-1970s; with a few subsequent changes to the law in 1983 and 2004.

==== The Netherlands ====
Tobacco advertising is only allowed in special tobacco stores, selling more than 90 kinds of tobacco products. This limits to only textual advertisement. Outside advertisement is not allowed. Inside the tobacco store, a limited amount of advertising is allowed. Salesmen can promote brands inside these stores, however their promotional material only contains dummy-cigarettes. Any other kind of advertising is a serious offence under Dutch law.

==== Serbia ====
In Serbia, tobacco advertising on television, on billboards and in printed media is banned, but advertisements for cigarettes are found within shops and kiosks.

==== Spain ====
In Spain, the government approved a draft tobacco law in 2025, which, if enacted, would extend existing tobacco controls by banning smoking and vaping on bar and restaurant terraces and other outdoor public spaces, and would apply the same advertising and sponsorship restrictions to e-cigarettes, nicotine pouches, and herbal smoking products as currently apply to conventional tobacco products.

==== United Kingdom ====
Although the United Kingdom is no longer an EU member country, the relevant EU directives banning tobacco advertising are implemented in the United Kingdom, in addition to UK laws restricting tobacco advertising.

The first calls to restrict advertising came in 1962 from the Royal College of Physicians, who highlighted the health problems and recommended stricter laws on the sale and advertising of tobacco products. In 1971, an agreement between the government and the tobacco industry saw the inclusion of health warnings on all cigarette packets. All television commercials for cigarettes were banned on 1 August 1965, although commercials for loose tobacco and cigars continued until 1991 after being outlawed by the Broadcasting Act 1990.

Non-television advertising campaigns were still allowed in the UK but came under stricter guidelines in 1986, which, in particular, prevented adverts from actually showing a person smoking. The tobacco producers responded with increasingly indirect and abstract campaigns, among which those of Benson & Hedges and Silk Cut became particularly recognisable. Until about the mid-1990s, many corner shops, newsagents and off-licences had on their shop signs prominent branding by cigarette brands such as Benson & Hedges, Silk Cut, Regal etc. until the practice was outlawed.

As part of their 1997 general election campaign, the Labour Party led by Tony Blair pledged to ban all advertising of tobacco products. When it was not included in their manifesto, it was introduced by Liberal Democrat peer Tim Clement-Jones and was passed as the Tobacco Advertising and Promotion Act 2002, which banned most remaining forms of advertising according to the following timescale:

| Date | What was banned |
|---|---|
| 14 February 2003 | General advertising (billboards, newspapers, magazines, etc.) |
| 14 May 2003 | Promotions |
| 30 July 2003 | Sponsorship of sporting events within the UK |
| May 2004 | Particular advertisements in tobacconists |
| 21 December 2004 | Large adverts in shops, pubs and clubs |
| 31 July 2005 | Sponsorship of excepted global events; brandsharing |

Several exemptions from this legislation remain:

- Advertisements that appear within the tobacco industry
- Advertisements carried (e.g. on websites accessible from the United Kingdom) by companies that do not carry on business within the United Kingdom
- Advertisements in pubs, clubs and shops, as long as the advert's total size does not exceed that of an A5 piece of paper, with 30% of that being taken up by government health warnings
- Advertisements other than those for cigarettes or hand-rolling tobacco within specialist tobacconists (defined to mean a shop where the sale of cigars, snuff, pipe tobacco and smoking accessories accounts for over 50% of their sales; notably this excludes cigarettes and rolling tobacco)
- Direct mail that has been specifically requested

While cigarette vending machines were still allowed in licensed premises (until 1 October 2011 in England, 1 February 2012 in Wales, 1 March 2012 in Northern Ireland and 29 April 2013 in Scotland when a full ban came into force) they were only allowed to display a picture of what was available (one image per brand) and no advertisements could be included on the machine.

Finally, cigarette vending machines were then banned in public areas of all British pubs, clubs and restaurants, with a fine of £2,500 for non-compliance.

The UK Advertising Standards Authority ruled that British American Tobacco and other companies could not promote unlicensed e-cigarettes containing nicotine on public Instagram accounts, including posts for the BAT's Vype brand, since such posts breached social media rules prohibiting the advertising of unlicensed nicotine products.

Famous UK tobacco advertising campaigns have included "You're never alone with a Strand" (a disastrous campaign which led to Strand Cigarettes being taken off the market) and "Happiness is a cigar called Hamlet".

=== North America ===
==== Canada ====
In Canada, the advertising of tobacco products was prohibited by the Tobacco Products Control Act as of 1988 and all tobacco products must show attributed warning signs on all packaging. Immediately following the passing of the legislation through parliament, RJR-MacDonald (RJR-MacDonald Inc. v. Canada (Attorney General)) filed suit against the Government of Canada through the Quebec Superior Court. It was argued that the act, which originally called for unattributed warnings, was a violation of the right to free speech. In 1991, the Quebec Superior Court ruled in favour of the tobacco companies, deciding that the act violated their right to freedom of expression under the Canadian Charter of Rights and Freedoms, as well as being ultra vires. The Crown subsequently appealed to the Supreme Court of Canada.

Nearly 20 years before the passing of the act, in 1969, the Canadian Broadcasting Corporation, Canada's national broadcasting service eliminated all tobacco advertising on both its radio and TV networks.

On 21 September 1995 the Supreme Court of Canada upheld the Tobacco Products Control Act as legal, forcing the tobacco companies operating in Canada to print hazard warnings on all cigarette packs. However, the Court struck down the requirement that the health warnings be unattributed, as this requirement violated the right to one's freedom of expression, further ruling that it was in the federal government's jurisdiction to pass such laws, as it fell under the peace, order and good government clause. Recently, sin taxes have been added to tobacco products, with the objective of decreasing usage by making the products less affordable. Currently, radio ads, television commercials, event sponsoring, promotional giveaways and other types of brand advertising are prohibited as well as in-store product displays. However, certain forms of advertising are permitted, such as print advertisements in magazines with an adult readership of 85% minimum.

Until 2003, tobacco manufacturers got around this restriction by sponsoring cultural and sporting events, such as the Benson & Hedges Symphony of Fire (a fireworks display in Toronto and Vancouver), which allowed the manufacturers' names and logos to appear in advertisements sponsoring the events, and at the venues. The ban on tobacco sponsorship was a major factor that led to the near-cancellation of the Canadian Grand Prix in Montreal and the du Maurier Ltd Classic, a women's golf tournament on the LPGA tour (now known as the Canadian Women's Open).

In May 2008, retail displays of cigarettes in convenience stores in British Columbia, Manitoba, Ontario, Quebec, Newfoundland and Labrador, New Brunswick, and Nova Scotia have been outlawed. They are now all hidden.

Under Canada's Vaping Products Promotion Regulations, advertising for vaping products or vaping product-related brand elements that can be seen or heard by young persons—including online and broadcast advertising, displays at points of sale and other public-facing promotions—is prohibited.

==== Mexico ====
Although Mexico has reduced its smoking population by more than half since 1980, it was not until 2008 that the General Law on Tobacco Control was passed by Congress. This law and the Regulations of the General Law on Tobacco Control expressly state that publicity and promotion of tobacco products can only be made through adult aimed magazines, personal communication by mail or displayed in establishments exclusively for adults. In these cases, it is prohibited to understate in any way the health risks of tobacco smoking or associate smoking, explicitly or in a vague manner, with athletic, sportive or popularity images.

Since this law came into effect in 2009, all cigarette packages in Mexico contain health warnings and graphic images, created and approved by the Secretariat of Health, that must cover 50% of the pack.

==== United States ====
After World War II, cigarette companies advertised frequently on radio and television. In the United States, in the 1950s and 1960s, cigarette brands were frequently sponsors of television programs. One of the most famous television jingles of the era came from an advertisement for Winston cigarettes. The slogan "Winston tastes good like a cigarette should!" proved to be catchy. Another popular slogan from the 1960s was "Us Tareyton smokers would rather fight than switch!", which was used to advertise Tareyton cigarettes. The first regular television news program in the US, Camel News Caravan, was sponsored by Camel Cigarettes and featured an ashtray on the desk in front of the newscaster and the Camel logo behind him. The show ran from 1949 to 1956. Meanwhile, Phillip Morris sponsored the hit TV show I Love Lucy for the series' first five seasons.

After WWII, heavy TV cigarette advertising led the Federal Communications Commission to require television stations to air anti-smoking advertisements at no cost to the organizations providing such advertisements. In June 1967, the Federal Communications Commission ruled that programs broadcast on a television station that discussed smoking and health were insufficient to offset the effects of paid advertisements that were broadcast for five to ten minutes each day. "We hold that the fairness doctrine is applicable to such advertisements," the Commission said. The FCC decision, upheld by the courts, essentially required television stations to air anti-smoking advertisements at no cost to the organizations providing such advertisements.

In 1970, Congress took their anti-smoking initiative one step further and passed the Public Health Cigarette Smoking Act, banning the advertising of cigarettes on television and radio starting on 2 January 1971. In April 1970, President Nixon signed it into law. The Virginia Slims brand was the last commercial shown, with "a 60-second revue from flapper to Female Lib", shown at 11:59 p.m. on 1 January 1971 during a break on The Tonight Show. After the television ban, most cigarette advertising took place in magazines, newspapers, and on billboards.

Smokeless tobacco ads, on the other hand, remained on the air until a ban took effect on 28 August 1986. Even further restrictions took effect under the Family Smoking Prevention and Tobacco Control Act.

Since 1984, cigarette companies have been forced to place Surgeon General's warnings on all cigarette packs and advertisements because of the passing of the Federal Cigarette Labeling and Advertising Act.

Under U.S. Food and Drug Administration Code of Federal Regulations (CFR) Title 21 part 1143, advertisements for cigarette tobacco, roll-your-own tobacco and other covered tobacco products, including many e-cigarettes, must prominently display the warning statement "WARNING: This product contains nicotine. Nicotine is an addictive chemical."

The 2010 Family Smoking Prevention and Tobacco Control Act prohibits tobacco companies from sponsoring sports, music, and other cultural events. It also prevents the display of tobacco logos or products on T-shirts, hats, or other apparel. The constitutionality of both this act and the Food and Drug Administration's new graphic cigarette warning labels are being questioned under cigarette companies' first amendment rights. Eventually, the law is planned to require almost all tobacco advertisements to consist of black text on a white background, but the constitutionality of that requirement has come under scrutiny.

After 1971, most tobacco advertising was done in magazines, newspapers, and on billboards. Since the introduction of the Federal Cigarette Labeling and Advertising Act, all packaging and advertisements must display a health warning from the Surgeon General. In November 2003, tobacco companies and magazine publishers agreed to cease the placement of advertisements in school library editions of four magazines with a large group of young readers: Time, People, Sports Illustrated, and Newsweek.

A 1994 report by the Surgeon General, "Preventing Tobacco Use Among Young People", asserted: "When young people no longer want to smoke the epidemic itself will die." A critical task of public health was counteracting the "indoctrination" of the young when they were most susceptible. Hence the report dismissed as "misguided" the debate as to whether cigarette promotion "caused" young people to smoke; the conclusion was that "Whether causal or not, [promotion] fosters the uptake of smoking, initiating for many a dismal and relentless chain of events".

Passed in 1997, the Tobacco Master Settlement Agreement bans outdoor, billboard, and public transportation advertising of cigarettes in 46 states. It also prohibits tobacco advertising that targets young people, the usage of cartoons (such as the Marlboro Man or Joe Camel) in particular. In the states which have not signed the agreement, billboards are a major venue of cigarette advertising (10% of Michigan billboards advertised alcohol and tobacco, according to the Detroit Free Press).

In 2010, the Tobacco Control Act became active and placed new restrictions on tobacco marketing, including extensive constraints concerning the circulation of cigarettes and smokeless tobacco to minors. Newly effective with this act, "audio advertisements are not permitted to contain any music or sound effects, while video advertisements are limited to static black text on a white background. Any audio soundtrack accompanying a video advertisement is limited to words only, with no music or sound effects."

=== South America ===
==== Brazil ====
The tobacco industry made extensive use of advertising until the 1990s. Historically, campaigns promoted tobacco as a symbol of sophistication, health, and virility. Between 1920 and 1960, there were no legal restrictions, and cigarette brand posters featured doctors, celebrities, and even babies to associate smokers with positive qualities. Over time, marketing began to exploit mass media (radio, magazines, television) and promotional activities. In the 1970s and 1980s, Brazilian companies in the sector sponsored major cultural and sporting events to reinforce the image of cigarettes among young people and adults. These strategies were gradually phased out. In 1996, Law No. 9,294 banned advertising on radio and TV and restricted the times and locations of advertisements.

Since 2011, any form of advertising for these products has been prohibited in Brazil, allowing only their display at points of sale accompanied by warnings about the harmful effects of tobacco. To comply with the legislation, the National Health Surveillance Agency (Anvisa) has published regulations on these warnings since 2001: prior to 2011, they were displayed on posters, panels, and signs at points of sale, and, following the advertising ban, they began to be applied to display cases and stands. Currently, RDC No. 840, published in the Federal Official Gazette on December 18, 2023, defines the requirements for the display of tobacco-derived smoking products for sale in Brazil, detailing how products must be presented at points of sale and establishing, through related Normative Instructions, the health warnings and mandatory messages on these displays.

=== Oceania ===
==== Australia ====
In 1972 the federal government introduced mandatory health warnings for radio and television cigarette advertisements. In September 1976 a total ban on tobacco and cigarette advertisements on TV and radio commenced. In December 1989 tobacco advertising was banned from all locally produced print media; this left only cinema, billboard and sponsorship advertising as the only forms of direct tobacco advertising.

In 1992 the Tobacco Advertising Prohibition Act 1992 expressly prohibited almost all forms of tobacco advertising in Australia, including the sponsorship of sporting or other cultural events by cigarette brands. Contracts were to be honoured and so domestic sporting and cultural events were allowed to have their corporate sponsorships run their course, but they were no longer allowed to enter into new or renew existing sponsorships. Therefore, by 1998, all domestic sponsorships had expired naturally. However, the Act gave the Federal Minister for Health and Ageing the right to grant exemptions to events "of international significance" that "would be likely to result in the event not being held in Australia" should tobacco advertising be forbidden. A clause in the Act forbade events from applying for an exemption after 1 October 2000, unless they had previously been granted one. By 2006, this had led to only two events being eligible – the Australian Motorcycle Grand Prix and the Australian Formula One Grand Prix. A further clause removed the Ministers right to grant any exemptions for any event held after 1 October 2006: the 2007 Australian Grand Prix therefore featured no tobacco advertising of any sort.

As of December 2013 in Australia, most cigarette packaging carried graphic images of the effects of smoking as well as information about the names and numbers of chemicals and annual death rates. Television ads included video footage of smokers struggling to breathe in hospital. Since then, the prevalence of daily smoking among adults aged 18+ years fell from 22.4% in 2001 to 10.6%, and daily smoking among persons aged 14+ halved to approximated 8.3% by 2022-23.

In April 2010, the Australian government announced plans to prohibit the use of tobacco industry logos, colors, brand imagery or promotional text of tobacco product packaging from 2012, requiring that brand names and product names be displayed in a standard drab brown color, font style and position in a policy known as "plain packaging". This legislation, the Tobacco Plain Packaging Act 2011, was challenged in the High Court by multiple tobacco manufacturers on the grounds that it exceeded the legislative capacity of Parliament by virtue of section 51 of the Constitution of Australia. This challenge was dismissed by the High Court.

==== New Zealand ====
Tobacco advertising in New Zealand was outlawed with the passage of the Smokefree Amendment Act 1990.

Prior to this, in 1963 advertisements for tobacco products were withdrawn from radio and television. A decade later in 1973, cigarette advertising was banned on billboards and in cinemas, and print media advertising was restricted to half a newspaper page.

In 1995 all remaining tobacco advertising and sponsorship was banned except for point-of-sale advertising and some tobacco sponsorship exemptions. Point-of-sale advertising ceased on 11 December 1998.

Upon point-of-sale advertising being finally banned in New Zealand there are other examples of tobacco advertising that will still remain. These include the use of tobacco packets as advertisements, exempted tobacco sponsorships, tobacco advertising and sponsorship in imported magazines and on cable television as well as the usual tobacco imagery in movies and television. Standardised (plain) packaging for tobacco products was subsequently introduced, requiring manufacturers to comply from 14 March 2018 and retailers to sell only compliant packs from 6 June 2018 following a transition period. This measure removed logos, colour schemes, and decorative elements from retail packaging and required enlarged health warnings and uniform colours and typefaces.

Health warnings – generally graphic images of the harmful effects of smoking – continue to be placed on all tobacco products.

== Anti-smoking advertising ==
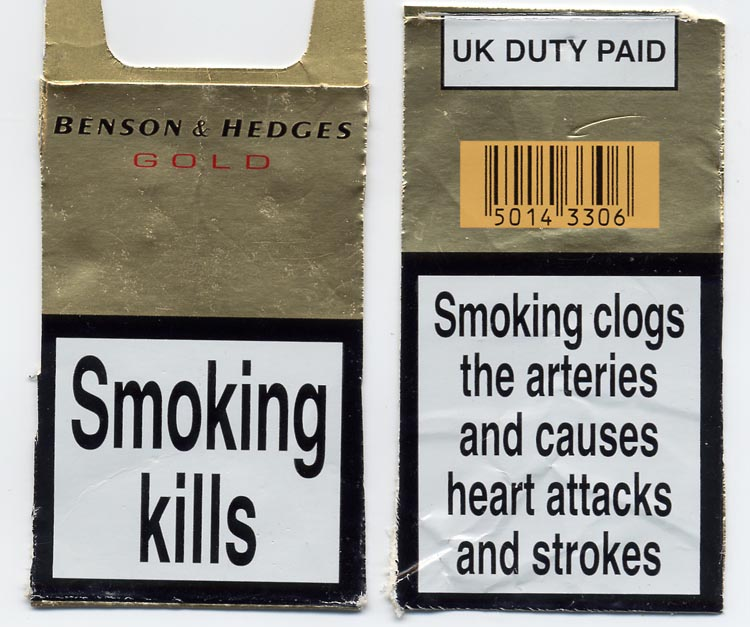
Many governments now require tobacco packaging to carry health warnings.

Some countries also impose legal requirements on the packaging of tobacco products. For example, in the countries of the European Union, Turkey, Australia Iran, and South Africa, cigarette packs must be prominently labeled with the health risks associated with smoking. Canada, Australia, Thailand, Iceland, Colombia, Mexico, Brazil and some EU countries have also imposed labels upon cigarette packs warning smokers of the effects, and they include graphic images of the potential health effects of smoking. In Canada, cards are also inserted into cigarette packs, explaining reasons not to smoke and different methods of quitting smoking.

Anti-smoking groups, particularly cancer charities, along with many government health departments, have attempted to counter the advertising of tobacco by creating their own advertisements to highlight the negative effects of smoking. The earliest commercials mainly focused on aiding smoking cessation, the increased risk of lung cancer and the problems associated with passive smoking. However, they have become increasingly hard-hitting over the years, with some campaigns now centered around decreased physical attractiveness and the risk of erectile dysfunction. These are more targeted towards younger smokers than previous campaigns. The British government spent £31 million in 2003 as part of their anti-smoking campaign.

In 2005 the European Union launched the "For a life without tobacco" campaign in all its constituent countries to help people quit smoking.

In 2007 and 2008, the New York City Department of Health launched a series of anti-tobacco ad campaigns to promote the city's Quitline and a free nicotine patch and gum program. The first TV spots, "Smoking is Eating You Alive" and "Smoking is Eating You and Your Kids Alive", depict the damage smoking can do to the body. The ads were noted for their graphic nature as well as their effectiveness. The second series of ads launched 16 April 2008. In these, a 58-year-old woman and longtime smoker called "Marie" describes the amputations and pain she has undergone since developing Buerger's disease, a condition that limits blood flow through the arteries and which was tied to her smoking habit.

The Marlboro Man was one of the most successful cigarette advertising campaigns, lasting from the 1960s to the 1990s. The Marlboro brand was promoted by various cowboys, with Wayne McLaren posing for some promotional photographs in 1976. He died of lung cancer in 1992, having appeared in a television spot showing him in a hospital bed. That image was juxtaposed with him during the promotional shoot, with a voiceover warning about the dangers of smoking.

== Plain tobacco packaging ==
Some countries have required that tobacco products be sold in standardized plain, dark brown packaging with warning labels. There is evidence that this reduces both smoking prevalence and misperceptions that some cigarettes ("light", "low-tar", etc.) are less harmful than others.

As of February 2024, an international report estimated that 25 countries and territories have adopted plain-packaging legislation and a further 42 countries and territories are advancing such regulations, either through implementation or planning.

== See also ==
- Regulation of electronic cigarettes
- Tobacco advertising
- Plain packaging
