= Just Loving You (album) =

Studio album by Anita Harris
- Released: 1967
- Genre: Pop
- Label: Columbia
- Producer: Mike Margolis

Anita Harris chronology
Somebody's In My Orchard (1966)	Just Loving You (1967)	Cudly Toy (1969)

Just Loving You is the second album by actress and singer Anita Harris, released in 1967 on the Columbia label. It charted at #29 on the UK Albums Chart and spawned the singles Just Loving You, The Playground and Anniversary Waltz.

== Track listing ==
1. "Anniversary Waltz" (A. Dubin/D. Franklin)
2. "You've Lost That Lovin' Feelin'" (B. Mann/K. Weil/P. Spector)
3. "Land of Dragon Dreams" (Mike Margolis/P. Akehurst)
4. "As Comes the Night (from the Motion Picture "Mr. Sebastian)" (H. Shaper/J. Goldsmith)
5. "The Playground" (Anita Harris/Mike Margolis/Alan Tew)
6. "Just Loving You" (Tom Springfield)
7. "Ava Maria" (Gounod, Arr. by Alan Tew)
8. "Turn Around" (Harry Belafonte/Malvina Reynolds/A. Greene)
9. "Crying For the Near" (Mike Margolis/Alan Tew)
10. "My Favourite Occupation (from the musical Charlie Girl)" (J. Taylor)
11. "The Night Has Flown" (David Whitaker/Mike Margolis)
12. "The Beatles Rhapsody (Penny Lane, Strawberry Fields Forever, All You Need Is Love)" (John Lennon/Paul McCartney)

== Production ==
- Produced and directed by Mike Margolis
- Musical Directors - Alan Tew & David Whitaker
- Sound Engineer - Keith Grant
