= Cliff Adams Singers =

British vocal group

The Cliff Adams Singers
- Origin: London, England
- Genres: Traditional pop, ballads, novelty songs
- Years active: 1954–2001
- Labels: Pye; Columbia; Decca; BBC

The Cliff Adams Singers were a British male/female vocal group, known for ballads and novelty songs, and especially their regular performances on BBC Radio from the 1950s onwards. The ensemble was established in 1954 by Clifford William Adams (21 August 1923 – 22 October 2001).

== Career ==
Cliff Adams was born on 21 August 1923 in Southwark, London, England. He became a chorister at St Mary le Bow, Cheapside, studied piano and organ, and by his mid-teens, had begun a professional musical career as a big band pianist. He was called up for the Royal Air Force in the Second World War, and became part of the RAF band, performing mostly in Africa. After the war he joined the Leslie Douglas band, and began working on arrangements for other bandleaders including Bert Ambrose, Ted Heath and Cyril Stapleton. In 1949, he formed a vocal group, The Stargazers, with Fred Datchler, Dick James (later replaced by Bob Brown), Ronnie Milne and Marie Benson. The group found success backing leading singers of the day. Adams also worked in the new medium of television advertising, writing many jingles, including those for Murray Mints, Fry's Turkish Delight, Milk Tray and Smash instant mashed potato.

In 1954, Adams formed a new group, the Show Band Singers, for live appearances, but the group was renamed the Cliff Adams Singers when it moved into broadcasting. On 3 July 1959, the singers first appeared on the BBC Light Programme in Sing Something Simple, also featuring Jack Emblow on piano and accordion. Featuring Adams's own arrangements of popular songs, the show was originally commissioned for six programmes, but was so successful that it was immediately extended, and continued to be broadcast every Sunday until shortly after Adams' death in 2001. According to one obituary of Adams, the Singers had a "smooth, melodic and unruffled sound [that] fitted a still nostalgic British post-war musical atmosphere."

The Cliff Adams Singers frequently sang medleys. Sometimes the songs were grouped thematically, other times they did medleys of songs by certain artists – Elvis Presley and The Everly Brothers, for example. They also sang traditional songs like "Old McDonald Had a Farm", "One Man Went To Mow", and the Swiss folk song, "Upidee". They had a Top 40 hit in the UK Singles Chart in 1960 with the "Lonely Man Theme". The piece was an instrumental release and was credited to the Cliff Adams Orchestra. The tune was used in a TV commercial for Strand cigarettes in the UK.

Several albums featuring the singers were released, usually entitled Sing Something Simple. Their albums reached number 15 in the UK Albums Chart in 1960 and 1962, number 23 in 1976 and number 39 in 1982. These releases included a special album featuring songs from the musicals. There was also a release called Sing Something Silver, to mark the 25th year of Sing Something Simple, and a "Very Best Of" compilation album, which featured 56 songs, not including the theme tune, which traditionally opened and closed the radio show, and most other compilations.

The Cliff Adams Singers were also recruited by Duke Ellington to perform with him in Coventry Cathedral in 1964, and Adams provided the score for the 1976 West End musical, Liza of Lambeth. The actress and entertainer Anita Harris was a singer with the group for three years from 1961.

Cliff Adams died on 22 October 2001 and his ashes are buried at Putney Vale Cemetery in London.

== See also ==
- List of vocal groups
- Easy listening
