= Sing Something Simple =

British radio programme

Sing Something Simple is a half-hour radio programme, which featured Cliff Adams and The Cliff Adams Singers, with Jack Emblow on accordion. The programme, which featured arrangements of popular easy-listening songs, ran for 42 years from 1959 until 2001, initially on the BBC Light Programme and later on BBC Radio 2, and earning itself the title of the longest-running continuous music programme in the world.

== Format ==
The lyrics to its main theme began as follows:

Sing something simple
As cares go by
Sing something simple
Just you and I

When Sing Something Simple was broadcast by Radio 2, this song would be followed by an announcer (in later years, Alan Dedicoat) who would say:

"We invite you to Sing Something Simple, a selection of songs, old and new, sung by The Cliff Adams Singers, accompanied by Jack Emblow."

and alternately 'We invite you to Sing Something Simple, not only listening, but joining in we hope, with all these songs you know so well'.

The pianist, Semprini, introduced his own show with "Old ones, new ones, loved ones, neglected ones" but the effect was similar on "Sing Something Simple".

The tune would then continue:

We'll sing the old songs
like you used to do,
We'll sing something simple for you,
something for you.

Ten minutes in, Cliff Adams would perform a piano solo, which he would introduce, after which the singers would continue with a selection of popular songs of varying vintage.

In the 1960s it was broadcast at 7pm, following on from Pick of the Pops, introduced by Alan Freeman.

In later years - particularly in the 1980s - in the days when Radio 2's FM frequencies were leased to BBC Radio 1, the programme would be broadcast at 4.30pm, directly before the Top 40.

The final broadcast was on 25 November 2001. The programme ended partly because Cliff Adams died that year, and partly because of Radio 2's repositioning to appeal to the former Radio 1 audience.
