= The Stargazers (vocal ensemble) =

British vocal group

- Origin: United Kingdom
- Genres: Pop, folk
- Years active: 1949–c. 1960
- Past members: Cliff Adams; Ronnie Milne; Marie Benson; Fred Datchler; Dick James; Bob Brown; Dave Carey; Eula Parker; June Marlow

The Stargazers were a British vocal group, jointly founded in 1949 by Cliff Adams and Ronnie Milne. Other original members were Marie Benson, Fred Datchler and Dick James.

Very shortly after the group made their first broadcasts with BBC Radio on such programmes as Workers' Playtime and The Goon Show, Dick James decided to resume his career as a solo vocalist, left the group, and was replaced by Bob Brown. Ronnie Milne took care of the musical arranging, while Cliff Adams became their manager, in addition to contributing scores for the group. In September 1953, Milne left the Stargazers to emigrate to Canada, and was replaced in the group by Dave Carey. The group served as backing vocalists for Petula Clark on her first recordings.

== Commercial success ==
Recording for Decca, The Stargazers enjoyed considerable commercial success during the 1950s, including two United Kingdom number one hit singles on their own, "Broken Wings", which was the first recording by a native British act to top the UK Singles Chart (all previous number one singles were by American artists), and "I See the Moon", along with a third number one hit with Dickie Valentine on "The Finger of Suspicion", and were much in demand for back-up work and broadcast work.

In 1954, The Stargazers recorded "The Happy Wanderer" by F.W. Möller with Syd Dean and His Band, which reached number 12 in April of that year. Other UK chart hits included "Close the Door" (by Fred Ebb and Paul Klein), which reached number 6 in September 1955, and "Twenty Tiny Fingers", which reached number 4 in November 1955. They were voted "most popular vocal group" by readers of the New Musical Express for five years running.

Stargazers' member Fred Datchler went on to form the Polkadots, who enjoyed success in their own right. Beyond their own hit singles and albums, which included a cover version of "April in Paris", the group recorded extensively with Jo Stafford, Peggy Lee and Frank Sinatra. One of Datchler's sons is Clark Datchler of Johnny Hates Jazz.

== Members ==
- Eula Parker, born 9 May 1923 in St Kilda, Victoria, Australia; died in Worthing, Sussex on 31 December 1985, aged 62.
- Dick James, born Isaac Vapnick on 12 December 1920 in London, died in London on 1 February 1986, aged 65.
- Fred Datchler, born Frederick Leonard Dachtler in Southwark; 4 August 1921, died on 19 September 1998.
- Cliff Adams, born 21 August 1923 in Southwark, died on 22 October 2001, aged 78.
- Marie Benson, born 30 April 1926 in Sydney, Australia, died in Australia in 2003.
- Ronnie Milne, born 11 April 1921 in Surrey, died in Ottawa, Canada on 9 February 2014, aged 92.
- Dave Carey, born 7 July 1925 in Warrington, died on 31 October 2015, aged 90.
- June Marlow, born 15 January 1931 in Plymouth, died in Plymouth on 22 February 2026, aged 95.
- Bob Brown, born in Sheffield in September 1918. His date of death is unknown.
- Nigel Brooks, born Nigel James Brooks, born 24 December 1926 in Barnstaple, died 2 March 2024 in Barnstaple, aged 97.
- Barbara Moore, born Barbara Birkby in Bradford, 7 March 1932, died Sussex, 27 August 2021, aged 89.

== Discography ==
=== Albums ===
- Presenting the Stargazers (Decca, 1954)
- South of the Border (Decca, 1959)
- Songs of Harry Lauder (with George Elrick) (London, 1960)
- The Very Best of the Stargazers (Universal/Spectrum, 1999)
- South of the Border and a Singles Compilation 1953–58 (Vocalion, 2003)

=== Singles ===
Year	Single	Peak chart positions	
Year	Single	AUS	UK
1950	"Music, Music, Music" (with Petula Clark; Australia-only release) b/w "Blossoms on the Bough"	—	—
1950	"Bamboo" (by The Organ, The Dance Band and Me; vocals by the Stargazers) b/w "The French Can Can Polka"	—	—
1950	"Brumas Brumas Brumas" (by The Organ, The Dance Band and Me; vocals by the Stargazers) b/w "A Load of Hay"	—	—
1950	"Ashes of Roses" (with Steve Conway) b/w "Mona Lisa"	—	—
1950	"The Trouble with Love, Is Love" b/w "Me and My Imagination"	—	—
1950	"Ferry Boat Inn" (with Benny Lee and Mary) b/w "I Taut I Taw a Puddy Tat"	—	—
1950	"Red Silken Stockings" b/w "Oh Babe"	—	—
1950	"Silver Dollar" (with Petula Clark; Australia-only release) b/w "Talky, Talky, Talky"	—	—
1951	"You're the Sweetest in the Land" (with Petula Clark) b/w "You Are My True Love"	—	—
1951	"Beloved Be Faithful" (with Petula Clark) b/w "Fly Away Peter, Fly Away Paul"	—	—
1951	"Mary Rose (Bloesem Van Seringen)" (by Stanley Black and His Orchestra; vocals by Dick James, the Stargazers and the George Mitchell Choir) b/w "Eleanor"	8	—
1951	"Black Girl" (with Josh White) b/w "On Top of Old Smoky"	—	—
1951	"The King's Horses" (by Ted Heath and His Music; vocals by Dennis Lotis and the Stargazers) b/w "Trumpet Voluntary"	—	—
1951	"Silver Dollar" (with Marie Benson) b/w "Look Mamma"	—	—
1952	"Rollin' Stone" b/w "Gleensleeves"	—	—
1952	"I Never Was Loved By Anyone Else (Until I Was Loved By You)" b/w "The Lie-De-Lie Song"	—	—
1952	"Saturday Rag" (with Les Howard) b/w "Bless Your Heart"		
1952	"It's a Long Way (From Your House to My House)" b/w "To Think You've Chosen Me"	—	—
1952	"A-round the Corner (Beneath the Berry Tree)" (with Primo Scala and His Banjo and Accordion Band) b/w "Dance Me Loose"	—	—
1952	"The Day of Jubilo" b/w "Sugarbush"	—	—
1953	"Broken Wings" b/w "Make It Soon"	—	1
1953	"Vaya con Dios (May God Be with You)" b/w "You You You"	—	—
1953	"I See the Moon" b/w "Eh Cumpari"	—	1
	"It's Christmas All Over the World" b/w "The Little Fir Tree"	—	—
1954	"The Happy Wanderer" b/w "Till We Two Are One"	—	12
1954	"The Man With the Banjo" b/w "Good Wholesome Beer"	—	—
1954	"Look at That Girl" (with Dennis Lotis; Australia-only release) b/w "I See the Moon"	— 2	—
1954	"I Need You Now" b/w "365 Kisses"	—	—
1954	"The Finger of Suspicion" (with Dickie Valentine) b/w "Who's Afraid (Not I, Not I, Not I)"	3	1
1954	"Rose of the Wildwood" b/w "Came the Morning"	—	—
1955	"Somebody" (with Sonny Farrar and His Banjo Band) b/w "(My Baby Don't Love Me) No More"	—	20
1955	"Hey Mr. Banjo" b/w "The Crazy Otto Rag"	6 10	— 18
1955	"Red Roses (For My Lady Fair)" (with Roy Smith) b/w "The Devil's in Your Eyes"	—	—
1955	"At the Steamboat River Ball" (with Sonny Farrar and His Banjo Band) b/w "I Love You a Mountain"	—	—
1955	"Close the Door" b/w "I've Got Four Big Brothers"	—	6
1955	"Twenty Tiny Fingers" b/w "An Old Beer Bottle"	—	4
1956	"(Love Is) The Tender Trap" b/w "When the Swallows Say Goodbye"	—	—
1956	"Zambesi" b/w "When the Swallows Say Goodbye"	—	—
1956	"Hot Diggity (Dog Ziggity Boom)" b/w "Rockin' and Rollin'"	—	28
1956	"John, Jacob, Jingleheimer Smith" b/w "She Loves to Rock"	—	—
1957	"You Won't Be Around" b/w "Mangos"	—	—
1957	"Honky Tonk Song" b/w "Golly!"	—	—
1957	"Who Is It? (It's the Milkman)" b/w "Sorry, You'll Have to Wait"	—	—
1957	"The Skiffling Dogs" b/w "Out of This World"	—	—
1958	"Big Man" b/w "Lonely for a Letter"	—	—
1959	"My Blue Heaven" b/w "How Ja Lika"	—	—
1960	"Secret Star" (US-only release) b/w "Three Beautiful Words"	—	—
1960	"Three Beautiful Words" b/w "Manhattan Spiritual"	—	—
"—" denotes releases that did not chart or were not released.

== See also ==
- List of artists under the Decca Records label
- List of artists who reached number one on the UK Singles Chart
