= Mr. Bloe =

British rock music group

Mr. Bloe was a 1970s British musical group. Their first single, "Groovin' with Mr. Bloe", was a hit in 1970 in the UK for Dick James Music (DJM). In the same year, an album Groovin' With Mr. Bloe was released internationally.

== "Groovin' with Mr. Bloe" ==
"Groovin' with Mr. Bloe"

Single by Mr. Bloe

from the album Groovin' with Mr. Bloe
- B-side: "Sinful"
- Released: March 1970
- Genre: Pop soul; northern soul; bubblegum
- Length: 2:45
- Label: DJM
- Songwriters: Bo Gentry; Paul Naumann; Kenny Laguna
- Producer: Stephen James

The tune "Groovin' with Mr. Bloe" was written for the US studio group Wind, by Bo Gentry, Paul Naumann and Kenny Laguna. They released it as the B-side of their single "Make Believe" which, with Tony Orlando as lead singer, was a chart success in the US in 1969. According to Laguna:

When "Make Believe", the first Wind single was ready to be released, we needed a B-side. Our Buddah releases were known for their ridiculous B-sides, like A-side played backwards in order for the business dudes to copyright something with themselves as writers, even though they couldn't write songs. We dusted off a backing track from a "Yummy Yummy", "Chewy Chewy", "Sugar Sugar", "Money Money" wannabe song that was called something like "Bingo Bingo" and improvised a haphazard harmonica and melodica overdub for the B-side.

=== Success in the UK ===
BBC Radio then unwittingly played the wrong side of the Wind single. It was heard by Stephen James, of Dick James Music, who wanted to release the tune in the UK but could not obtain the rights. He had the tune covered by other musicians including Elton John on piano, but did not like that version. It was then rearranged by Zack Laurence and re-recorded with Laurence replacing John on piano.

The tune was released in the UK in March 1970, reaching number 2 in the UK Singles Chart on 21 June 1970, with "In the Summertime" by Mungo Jerry preventing the song from topping the charts. "Groovin' With Mr Bloe" spent 18 weeks on the UK chart. Zack Laurence then performed the tune on Top of the Pops with Ian Duck (harmonica), Dee Murray (bass), Roger Pope (drums) and Caleb Quaye (guitar), who went on to form the band Hookfoot.

Some sources credit the harmonica part on the actual recording to Harry Pitch, which Pitch later confirmed in his filmed interview with RockHistory.co.uk; Pitch then went on as the harmonica player to perform the theme tune for Last of the Summer Wine.

Other singles were then released, "Curried Soul" in 1970 and "Mr. Bloe" in 1971. "Mr. Bloe" featured two instrumentals written by Elton John – "71-75 New Oxford Street" and "Get Out Of This Town", with John playing piano on both, backed by most of the members of Hookfoot. Both failed to chart, and an album, also titled Groovin' with Mr. Bloe, released in 1970, had also flopped, leaving the act as a one-hit wonder.

=== Personnel ===
- Caleb Quaye – guitar
- Ian Duck – guitar
- Russ Stableford – bass
- Harry Pitch – harmonica
- Zack Laurence – piano
- Roger Pope – drums

=== Legacy ===
After the tune's success in Britain, the original version of "Groovin' with Mr. Bloe" was reissued in the U.S. in August 1970, credited to the band Cool Heat. It reached number 89 on the Billboard Hot 100.

"Groovin' with Mr. Bloe" was used as the theme music to the 2009 BBC TV series Oz and James Drink to Britain. It was also used in the early 1970s by Argentine television as the introduction music for football broadcasting.

The lack of an obvious performer made the recording mysterious and it became a favourite of Morrissey, who was then 11 years old.

"Groovin' with Mr. Bloe" is also a lyric in the song "I Was a Mod Before You Was Mod" by the band Television Personalities. The B-side to Madness' "Our House" single was "Walking With Mr Wheeze", an instrumental with scratch mix effects. The song was partly recorded by The Fall in 2003, for a Peel session as the beginning of their song "Green Eyed Loco Man". The tune was covered on a B-side by Associates in 1990, and Robert Johnson and the Punchdrunks in 2002.

In 2002, Robin Carmody of Freaky Trigger describes "Groovin' with Mr. Bloe" as "the last great groove-driven pop record of the 60s", and included the track in his list of ten British bubblegum classics, writing: "Nothing but bass, harmonica and groove – not funk, not rhythm, but groove in excelsis, and sometimes that's enough."

Excerpts from the song was regularly used as a musical interlude on the 'The Danny Baker Show', broadcast on BBC Radio 5 Live on Saturday mornings up to the show's demise in 2019.

== Charts ==
Chart (1970)	Peak position
Australia (Kent Music Report)	59
Belgium (Ultratop 50 Flanders)	2
Belgium (Ultratop 50 Wallonia)	3
Germany (GfK)	7
Ireland (IRMA)	8
Netherlands (Single Top 100)	7
Netherlands (Single Top 100)	6
New Zealand (Listener)	8
South Africa (Springbok Radio)	7
Switzerland (Schweizer Hitparade)	4
UK Singles (Official Charts)	2

As Cool Heat

Chart (1970)	Peak position
US Billboard Hot 100	89
