= Nigel Brooks =

English composer, arranger and conductor (1926–2024)

Nigel James Brooks (24 December 1926 – 2 March 2024) was an English composer, arranger and conductor.

== Biography ==
Nigel James Brooks was born in Barnstaple on 24 December 1926. He spent most of his childhood in Ilfracombe, North Devon. He attended Guildhall School of Music and Drama in London. For much of his career he was an orchestral arranger, particularly for the BBC and also conducted the BBC Concert Orchestra. He was a member of the vocal group the Stargazers.

He formed his own musical ensemble, "The Nigel Brooks Singers", which appeared on Friday Night is Music Night and earned three gold discs, and two silver.

Brooks wrote three ballets for Sadler's Wells (Barnstaple Fair, Seven Cameos for Combe and The Water Babies), and an opera based on Daphne du Maurier's novel Jamaica Inn. He was married to Jean, whose death was commemorated by his adagio for strings To My Love.

As part of the 2022 Birthday Honours, Brooks was awarded the British Empire Medal (BEM) for services to musical theatre and the music industry.

Brooks died at his home in Barnstaple, on 2 March 2024, at the age of 97.
