= Just Loving You =

Single by Anita Harris

from the album Just Loving You
- Released: June 1967
- Length: 3:10
- Label: CBS
- Songwriter: Tom Springfield
- Producer: Margolis

Just Loving You is a 1967 song written by Tom Springfield and recorded by Anita Harris. It reached #6 in the UK and #18 in Ireland. It charted very minorly in the U.S., reaching #120 and #20 Adult Contemporary.

It was given to Harris to sing by Tom Springfield after Harris appeared on Top of the Pops.

Recorded at Olympic Studios in a session produced by Margolis and featuring harmonica virtuoso Harry Pitch, "Just Loving You" hit the UK Top 50 on 1 July 1967. Even after peaking at No. 6 on 26 August 1967 "Just Loving You" remained in the UK Top 40 until the end of the year, dropping out of the chart on 27 January 1968.
