= Jack Emblow =

British jazz accordionist (born 1930)

- Born: Jack Alexander Emblow; 27 June 1930 (age 96); Lincoln, England
- Genres: MOR; jazz
- Occupation: Musician
- Instrument: Accordion
- Years active: 1941–2016
- Labels: Columbia; Chevron; Dansan; Maestro; Pickwick Music

Jack Alexander Emblow (born 27 June 1930) is a British jazz accordionist who is best known for his musical work accompanying the Cliff Adams Singers on BBC Radio.

== Biography ==
Jack Alexander Emblow was born on 27 June 1930 in Lincoln, England. His father sang a little and his mother played piano but not professionally. He studied the piano at the age of nine although moved on to the accordion aged 11. In his early teens he was a member of Jack Kitson's Accordion Band. It was with this band that he met his future wife and fellow accordionist, Pat Lowe. At 15 he was part of a stage act with jazz pianist Eddie Thompson and in 1947, aged 17, he auditioned with the BBC. In addition to solo broadcasts, as a young man he played with Al Podesta & His Accordion Band also in the 1940s.

He worked at the Berkeley Hotel in Piccadilly, playing for Ian Stewart for three years. He formed a sextet (The Jack Emblow Sextet) in 1956 which made its radio debut in the programme Music While You Work and remained with them until 1961. Emblow performed in over 500 broadcasts of which 54 were in Music While You Work. He also contributed the music to the radio programmes Bright and Early, Morning Music and On with the Bands. The Sextet was regarded by senior BBC producers as 'the best small group on radio, led by one of the most skilful accordionists in the country'.

As a session player, he worked with a huge number of artists, including singers and bands such as Alma Cogan, Elton John, Elaine Paige, the Beat, Curved Air, Rolf Harris, Michael Holliday, Tom Jones, Grace Jones, Donovan, Peter Sarstedt, Sandie Shaw as well as accordionists Jimmy Shand and Dermot O'Brien. He has also worked with orchestras led by George Martin, Ted Heath, Michel Legrand, Henry Mancini and bandleader Nelson Riddle. On 25 June 1967 he played on the Beatles' "All You Need Is Love" session held at Abbey Road Studios number 2 playing on the first live, worldwide satellite programme to an international audience in excess of 350 million. He is also featured on the soundtracks of many films, radio and TV programmes.

He has been regarded as Britain's top jazz accordionist, although Emblow has always said that he is a 'general all rounder'. For over 40 years he provided the accordion accompaniment for the Cliff Adams Singers in their half hour broadcasts on BBC Radio called Sing Something Simple. During a BBC Radio 2 revamp, starting in January 1973, Emblow was asked to form and front a quintet called 'The French Collection' which he led on the French Musette accordion. It was created to offer light-hearted happy sounding incidental music for the Ray Moore Show on BBC Radio 2. The group became popular, and several LP recordings were made.

Emblow uses a straight-tuned Excelsior accordion, which has a dedicated tone chamber enabling him to create a mellow tone. He has contributed to the incidental music for the sitcom television series Last of the Summer Wine as well as playing the theme music to the sitcom 'Allo 'Allo!. His long career brought him the British Academy of Songwriters Composers and Authors Gold Badge of Merit for Music.

In more recent years Emblow has worked with jazz guitarist Martin Taylor on recordings of Spirit of Django series. One of the tracks from the series was used in a well known television car advert featuring characters 'Nicole' and her 'papa'. In 2002, he was elected Honorary President of the National Accordion Organisation of the United Kingdom, and continued to give recitals throughout the UK until his retirement in July 2016. He has been dubbed 'Peter Pan' by his fellow musicians due to his young appearance for his age. He cites his influences as Art Van Damme and Ernie Felice, both of whom were accordionists with the Benny Goodman Band.

== Personal life ==
Emblow married Pat Lowe, a fellow accordionist, whilst he was with the Amalfi Trio in London's West End. He also met friend, and jazz accordionist, Tony Compton in the early 1960s. They began playing together in 1985 at an impromptu session at the jazz masterclass at an accordion festival. They continued to play together for many years after this.

== Discography ==
- Accordion Fire (1968)
- Accordion Nights (1968)
- Accordion Showcase (1979)
- Around the World (1983)
- Enjoy Yourself (1984)
- I Love Paris (1986)
