= Dick James =

British music publisher and singer (1920–1986)

- Born: Isaac Vapnick; 12 December 1920; London, England
- Died: 1 February 1986 (aged 65); London, England
- Other name: Richard Leon James
- Occupations: Singer; music publisher
- Years active: 1937–1986

Richard Leon James (born Isaac Vapnick; 12 December 1920 – 1 February 1986) was a British music publisher and singer. He and Brian Epstein established The Beatles' publishing company, Northern Songs. Later, with his son Stephen, James founded the DJM record label and recording studios, which signed Elton John and Bernie Taupin.

== Early life ==
James was born on 12 December 1920 in the East End of London, to Polish Jewish immigrants. His father was a kosher butcher.

== Early singing career ==
James sang with North London dance bands in his early teens, and was a regular vocalist at the Cricklewood Palais by the age of seventeen. He joined the Henry Hall band and made his first radio broadcast in 1940, but his career was interrupted in 1942 by World War II when he joined the army. After the war he continued to sing with leading bands, including Geraldo's. James was an original member of The Stargazers, a popular early 1950s vocal group. In the 1950s he often appeared in the top ten Melody Maker vocal charts alongside the likes of Dickie Valentine and Frank Holder.

He was the singer of the theme songs of The Adventures of Robin Hood and The Buccaneers, television series produced in England in the 1950s.

== Switch to publishing ==
James entered the music publishing business as his singing career tapered off. In the early 1950s, he was introduced by Ron Goodwin to Parlophone assistant A&R director George Martin. In 1958, he joined Sidney Bron Music as a song-plugger, leaving in 1961 to start his own company, Dick James Music.

On 27 November 1962, he was contacted by Brian Epstein, who was looking for a publisher for the second Beatles single, "Please Please Me". James called Philip Jones, producer of the TV show Thank Your Lucky Stars, played the record down the phone to him and secured the band's first nationwide television appearance. The pair subsequently established Northern Songs Ltd., with Beatles John Lennon and Paul McCartney, to publish Lennon and McCartney's original songs (fellow Beatles George Harrison and Ringo Starr were also signed to Northern Songs as songwriters, but did not renew their contracts in 1968). James's company, Dick James Music, administered Northern Songs.

What began as an amicable working relationship between the Beatles and James disintegrated by the late 1960s: the Beatles considered that James had betrayed and taken advantage of them when he sold Northern Songs in 1969 without offering the band an opportunity to buy control of the publishing company. James profited handsomely from the sale of Northern Songs, but the Beatles never again had the rights to their own songs.

During the 1960s, James also handled Billy J. Kramer and Gerry and the Pacemakers. James lived in Anson Road, Cricklewood, north-west London, in the 1960s. He was involved, along with Brian Epstein, in offering a singing contract to Bobby Willis, who turned it down on the insistence of his future wife, Cilla Black. Willis was a backing singer on Cilla Black's "You're My World".

== Later life and death ==
James signed Earl Okin in 1965, but as the singer was preoccupied with his studies at university, James sought other artistes. He signed Elton John (then known as Reginald Dwight) and his lyricist Bernie Taupin as untried unknowns in 1967 after his son, Stephen, who had been working with his father since 1963, found Dwight using their recording studios late at night without permission. (This rumour may actually come from the time when some of Dick James' employees used the studio over the weekend without permission. Dick found out and they thought that they would be sacked. Instead, Dick demanded to hear what they had recorded, in case anything might be commercial). Stephen, who had started the recording studios and opened a record production company called This Productions, formed DJM Records in 1969.

All of John's releases up to 1976 were issued on the DJM record label. The label also carried Jasper Carrott, RAH Band, Danny Kirwan, and John Inman.

John formed his own Rocket label in 1973, and in 1982 was involved in a court case with James about royalties.

In June 1985, the British music magazine NME reported that John was suing James over the rights to his earlier material – a case which John lost.

James died in London of a heart attack on 1 February 1986, at the age of 65.

Dick James Music was acquired by PolyGram which was, in turn, bought by Universal Music Group. The Dick James catalog is currently part of Universal Music Publishing Group.

== UK chart hits ==
- "Robin Hood" / "The Ballad of Davy Crockett" (1956) – number 14
- "Garden of Eden" (1957) – number 18
