= Strand (cigarette) =

Former British cigarette brand

- Product type: Cigarette
- Current owner: Imperial Brands
- Produced by: W.D. & H.O. Wills
- Country: United Kingdom
- Introduced: 1959
- Discontinued: Early 1960s
- Related brands: Embassy
- Markets: United Kingdom
- Tagline: "You're never alone with a Strand. The cigarette of the moment."

Strand was a British brand of cigarettes which was owned and manufactured by W.D. & H.O. Wills (a now defunct subsidiary of Imperial Tobacco).

== History ==
Strand was launched in 1959 but withdrawn in the early 1960s. The launch was accompanied by a huge television advertising campaign with the slogan "You're never alone with a Strand". They also ran advertisements in newspapers offering a free pack of Strand cigarettes to readers who filled in a coupon and sent it in.

== Marketing ==
=== You're never alone with a Strand ===
A Strand pack

This television advertisement depicted a dark, wet, deserted London street scene in which a raincoated character, played by Terence Brook, looking similar to Frank Sinatra, lit a cigarette and puffed reflectively. This was accompanied by an instrumental, "The Lonely Man Theme" by Cliff Adams, playing in the background and a voice-over declared "You're never alone with a Strand. The cigarette of the moment".

The commercial, written by John May, was popular with the public, with Brook becoming a star, and the music reaching Number 39 in the UK Singles Chart.

However, sales of the brand were poor and it was soon taken off the market. The public associated smoking Strand cigarettes with being lonely and were put off from buying them. It is regarded as one of the most disastrous tobacco advertising campaigns of all time with only 0.3% of male smokers and 0.7% of female smokers ever buying a pack of Strand cigarettes.

The company rebranded Strand as Embassy. The new TV adverts showed a man at a party, ignored by everyone. He produces a pack of Embassy, starts offering them around and is suddenly the life and soul of the party. The advertising campaign's success can be judged by its outcome: Embassy became the biggest selling cigarette of the 1960s.

== See also ==
- Tobacco smoking
