= The Anniversary Waltz =

Single by Bing Crosby
- B-side: "Shepherd Serenade"
- Released: 1941
- Recorded: July 14, 1941
- Length: 2:59
- Label: Decca (256)
- Songwriters: Dave Franklin, Al Dubin

The Anniversary Waltz is a popular song written by Dave Franklin, the lyrics by Al Dubin.

== History ==
The song was published in 1941. The title "Anniversary Waltz" is often mistakenly and confusingly used to refer to the entirely unrelated Anniversary Song, whose melody is a Romanian tune composed in 1880.

Bing Crosby recorded the song on July 14, 1941, for Decca Records with Victor Young and His Orchestra. The song briefly charted in the USA reaching the No. 24 spot.

The song has also been covered by Vera Lynn, Connie Francis, Della Reese, and Mantovani.

Ricky Ricardo performed the song to end the I Love Lucy episode "Hollywood Anniversary" (season 4 episode 4).
