= Peter Green discography =

This is a discography for Peter Green, the founder and original lead guitarist of Fleetwood Mac in the late 1960s. During the late 1970s and early 1980s, he had a brief solo career, before further success in the late 1990s with the Peter Green Splinter Group.

== Discography ==
=== Albums ===
- The End of the Game (1970) Reprise RS 6436 [US]; Reprise RSLP 9006
- In the Skies (1979) PVK Records PVLS 101 [Green vinyl version also released]
- Little Dreamer (1980) PVK Records PVLS 102
- Whatcha Gonna Do? (1981) PVK Records PET 1
- White Sky (1982) Creole/Headline HED 1
- Kolors (1983) Creole/Headline HED 2 [Picture Disc LP version also released]

=== Singles ===
- "Heavy Heart" / "No Way Out" (1971)
- "Beasts of Burden" / "Uganda Woman" (1972) with Nigel Watson
- "Apostle" / "Tribal Dance" (1978) – from In the Skies
- "In the Skies" / "Proud Pinto" (1979) – from In the Skies
- "Slabo Day" / "In the Skies" (1979) – Germany (green vinyl)
- "Loser Two Times" / "Momma Don'tcha Cry" (1980) – from Little Dreamer
- "Walkin' the Road" / "Woman Don't"* (1980) – from Little Dreamer
- "Give Me Back My Freedom" / "Lost My Love" (1981) – from Whatcha Gonna Do?
- "Promised Land" / "Bizzy Lizzy" (1981) – from Whatcha Gonna Do?
- "The Clown" / "Time for Me to Go" (1982) – from White Sky
- "Big Boy Now" / "Bandit" (1983) – from Kolors

*non-album track

=== Compilations ===
- Blue Guitar (1981) Creole CRX 5
- Legend (1988) Creole CRX 12
- Backtrackin' / A Rock Legend (1989) Castle TRKLP 101
- Last Train to San Antone (1991) Frog FG 2-801
- Baby When the Sun Goes Down (1992)
- Collection (1993)
- Rock and Pop Legends (1995)
- Green and Guitar (1996) – Music Collection MCCD 244
- Bandit (1997)
- Knights of the Blues Table (1997) – Lightyear/WEA
- Blues for Dhyana (1998)
- Born on the Wild Side (1998)
- Alone with the Blues (2000)
- The Clown (2001)
- A Fool No More (2001) – Midnite Jazz & Blues Collection MJB 100
- Promised Land (2001)
- The Anthology (2008)

== Peter Green Splinter Group ==
- Peter Green Splinter Group (1997) Snapper Music SARCD 101
- The Robert Johnson Songbook (1998) Snapper Music SARCD 002
- Destiny Road (1999) Snapper Music SMACD 817
- Hot Foot Powder (2000) Snapper Music SMACD 828
- Time Traders (2001) Eagle EAGCD 193
- Blues Don't Change (2001) Eagle EAGCD 200
- Reaching the Cold 100 (2003) Eagle EAGCD 224

== Guest contributions ==
With Peter B's Looners

- "If You Want to Be Happy" / "Jodrell Blues" (1966)

With Eddie Boyd

- Eddie Boyd and His Blues Band featuring Peter Green (1967)
- "The Big Boat" / "Sent for You Yesterday" (1968)
- 7936 South Rhodes (1968)

With John Mayall's Bluesbreakers

- Bare Wires (1968)
- Blues from Laurel Canyon (1968)

With Duster Bennett

- Smiling Like I'm Happy (1968)
- "Smiling Like I'm Happy" (1969)
- Bright Lights (1969)
- 12 DB's (1970)

With Gordon Smith

- Long Overdue (1968)
- "Too Long" / "Funk Pedal" (1969)

With Otis Spann

- The Biggest Thing Since Colossus (1969)
- "Blues for Hippies" / "Bloody Murder" (1972)

With Brunning Sunflower Blues Band

- Trackside Blues (1969)
- I Wish You Would (1970)

With Clifford Davis

- "Man of the World" / "Before the Beginning" (1969)
- "Come On Down and Follow Me" / "Homework" (1970)

With Gass

- Juju (1970)

With Jeremy Spencer

- Jeremy Spencer (1970)

With Peter Bardens

- The Answer (1970)

With Memphis Slim

- Blue Memphis (1971)

With B. B. King

- B. B. King in London (1971) Green plays on "Caldonia"

With Dave Kelly

- Dave Kelly (1971)

With Country Joe McDonald

- Hold On It's Coming (1971)

With Toe Fat

- Toe Fat Two (1970)

With Fleetwood Mac

- Penguin (1973) – "Night Watch" (uncredited)
- Tusk (1979) – "Brown Eyes" (uncredited)

With Richard Kerr

- From Now Until Then (1973)

With Duffo

- The Disappearing Boy (1980)

With Mick Fleetwood

- The Visitor (1981)

With Brian Knight

- A Dark Horse (1981)

With "The Best Guitarists Ever"

- Twang! (1996) – "Midnight" (credited as "Peter Green & Splinter Group")

With SAS Band

- SAS Band (1997)

With Dick Heckstall-Smith

- Blues and Beyond (2001)

With Chris Coco

- Next Wave (2002)

With Peter Gabriel

- Up (2003)

== As a band member ==
With John Mayall's Bluesbreakers

- "Looking Back" / "So Many Roads" (1966)
- "Sitting in the Rain" / "Out of Reach" (1967)
- A Hard Road (1967)
- John Mayall's Bluesbreakers with Paul Butterfield (1967, EP) – with Paul Butterfield
- "Curly" / "Rubber Duck" (1967)
- "Double Trouble" / "It Hurts Me Too" (1967)

=== With Fleetwood Mac ===
==== Singles ====
- "I Believe My Time Ain’t Long" / "Rambling Pony" (1967)
- "Shake Your Moneymaker" / "My Heart Beat Like a Hammer" (1968) – from Fleetwood Mac (1968)
- "Black Magic Woman" / "The Sun Is Shining" (1968)
- "Need Your Love So Bad" / "Stop Messin’ Round" (1968)
- "Albatross" / "Jigsaw Puzzle Blues" (1968)
- "Man of the World" / "Somebody’s Gonna Get Their Head Kicked In Tonite" (1969)
- "Oh Well Pt.1" / "Oh Well Pt. 2" (1969)
- "The Green Manalishi" / "World in Harmony" (1970)

==== Albums ====
- Fleetwood Mac (1968)
- Mr. Wonderful (1968)
- Then Play On (1969)

=== With Katmandu ===
- A Case for the Blues (with Katmandu) (1985) Nightflite NTFL 2001

== General references ==
- Fleetwood Mac Legacy
- Allmusic discography Allmusic's complete discography of Fleetwood Mac
