= Legend (Peter Green album) =

Compilation album by Peter Green
- Released: 1988
- Recorded: 1979–81
- Genre: Blues rock
- Label: Creole Records
- Producer: Peter Vernon-Kell, Peter Green & Geoff Robinson

Peter Green chronology
A Case for the Blues (1985)	Legend (1988)

Professional ratings
Review scores
Source	Rating
Allmusic	3/5 stars

Legend is an album by British blues rock musician Peter Green, who was the founder of Fleetwood Mac and a member from 1967 to 1970. Released in 1988, it contained tracks from and outtakes recorded for his four PVK albums from 1979 to 1983.

Peter Green's songwriting credits were under his original name of Peter Greenbaum. Many of the tracks were composed by Peter's brother, Mike Green.

== Track listing ==
1. "Touch My Spirit" (Mike Green)
2. "Six String Guitar" (M. Green)
3. "Proud Pinto" (P. Green)
4. "The Clown" (M. Green)
5. "You Won't See Me Anymore" (Mike Green)
6. "Long Way From Home" (Mike Green)
7. "Little Dreamer" (P. Green)
8. "In The Skies" (P. Green)
9. "Rubbing My Eyes" (Mike Green)
10. "What Am I Doing Here" (Mike Green)
11. "Corner Of My Mind" (Mike Green)
12. "Carry My Love" (Mike Green)
13. "Bandit" (Peter Greenbaum, M. Green)
14. "White Sky" (M. Green)
- Tracks 3, 8 are from In the Skies
- Tracks 9–10, 13 are outtakes from Little Dreamer
- Track 7 is from Little Dreamer
- Tracks 2, 5–6 are outtakes from Whatcha Gonna Do?
- Tracks 1, 11–12 are outtakes from White Sky
- Tracks 4, 14 are from White Sky

== Personnel ==
- Peter Green – guitar, vocals
- Mike Green – vocals
- Ronnie Johnson – rhythm guitar
- Larry Steele – bass guitar
- Paul Westwood – bass guitar
- Mo Foster – bass guitar
- Webster Johnson – keyboards
- Roy Shipston – keyboards
- Reg Isidore – drums
- Dave Mattacks – drums
- Jeff Whittaker – percussion

== Production ==
- Produced by Peter Vernon-Kell (1–3, 5–10, 13), Peter Green & Geoff Robinson (1,4, 11–12, 14)
