= Kolors =

Compilation album by Peter Green
- Released: 1983
- Recorded: 1981–82
- Genre: Blues rock
- Label: Creole Records
- Producer: Ron Lee

Peter Green chronology
White Sky (1982)	Kolors (1983)	A Case for the Blues (1985)

Professional ratings
Review scores
Source	Rating
Allmusic	2.5/5 stars

Kolors is the sixth and final solo album by British blues rock musician Peter Green, who was the founder of Fleetwood Mac and a member from 1967 to 1970. Released in 1983, the album consisted largely of songs from previous recording sessions that had not been included on his past albums.

Peter Green's songwriting credits were under his original name of Peter Greenbaum. Many of the tracks were composed by Peter's brother, Mike Green.

== Track listing ==
All tracks written by Mike Green, except where noted.

1. "What Am I Doing Here?" – 3:30
2. "Bad Bad Feeling" – 3:38
3. "Big Boy Now" – 5:55
4. "Black Woman" – 3:59
5. "Bandit" (Peter Greenbaum, M. Green) – 3:05
6. "Same Old Blues" (Traditional) – 3:45
7. "Liquor and You" – 3:49
8. "Gotta Do It with Me" – 4:02
9. "Funky Jam" (P. Greenbaum) – 8:14
- Tracks 1, 4 & 5 are outtakes from Little Dreamer
- Track 5 can be found in its original form on the album Legend
- Tracks 2, 6–8 are outtakes from Whatcha Gonna Do?
- Tracks 3 & 9 are outtakes from White Sky

== Track listing (remastered & expanded version) ==
1. "Black Woman" (M. Green)
2. "Bandit" (P. Greenbaum, M. Green)
3. "What Am I Doing Here?" (M. Green)
4. "Bad Bad Feeling" (M. Green)
5. "Same Old Blues" (Traditional)
6. "Liquor and You" (M. Green)
7. "Gotta Do It with Me" (M. Green)
8. "Big Boy Now" (M. Green)
9. "Funky Jam" (P. Greenbaum)
10. "Apostle" (single version) (P. Greenbaum)
11. "Whatcha Gonna Do?" (M. Green)
12. "Rubbing My Eyes" (M. Green)
13. "Long Way from Home" (M. Green)
14. "Six String Guitar" (M. Green)
15. "You Won't See Me Anymore" (M. Green)
- Track 10 is an outtake from In the Skies
- Tracks 1–3 & 12 are outtakes from Little Dreamer
- Track 2 can be found in its original form on the album Legend
- Tracks 4–7, 11, 13–15 are outtakes from Whatcha Gonna Do?
- Tracks 8 & 9 are outtakes from White Sky

== Personnel ==
- Peter Green – guitar, vocals
- Mike Green – vocals
- Bob Bowman – guitar
- Ronnie Johnson – guitar
- Larry Steele – bass guitar
- Paul Westwood – bass guitar
- Mo Foster – bass guitar
- Daniel Boone – keyboards, backing vocals
- Webster Johnson – keyboards
- Roy Shipston – keyboards
- Reg Isidore – drums
- Dave Mattacks – drums
- Jeff Whittaker – percussion
- Trevor Orton – pan pipes
- Lesley Boone – backing vocals

== Technical ==
- Ron Lee – producer
- Dave Lester – engineer
