= Hot Foot Powder (album) =

Studio album by Peter Green Splinter Group
- Released: 17 April 2000
- Recorded: 2000
- Genre: Blues
- Length: 42:50; 49:40 (with bonus tracks)
- Label: Crown / Artisian, Snapper Music
- Producer: Peter Green Splinter Group

Peter Green Splinter Group chronology
Destiny Road (1999)	Hot Foot Powder (2000)	Time Traders (2001)

Professional ratings
Review scores
Source	Rating
Allmusic	2.5/5 stars

Hot Foot Powder is an album by the British blues band the Peter Green Splinter Group, led by Peter Green. Released in 2000, this was their fifth album. Green was the founder of Fleetwood Mac and a member of that group from 1967 to 1970, before a sporadic solo career during the late 1970s and early 1980s.

Like one of the group's previous albums, The Robert Johnson Songbook, Hot Foot Powder consisted of songs written by Robert Johnson, and included contributions by a number of notable blues musicians, including Buddy Guy, Hubert Sumlin, Otis Rush, David Honeyboy Edwards, Joe Louis Walker and Dr. John. It was re-released in 2004 by Snapper Music with bonus tracks.

== Track listing ==
All tracks written by Robert Johnson unless stated:

1. "I'm a Steady Rollin' Man" – 3:34
2. "From Four Until Late" – 3:02
3. "Dead Shrimp Blues" – 2:49
4. "Little Queen of Spades" – 3:01
5. "They're Red Hot" – 3:51
6. "Preachin' Blues" – 2:44
7. "Hellhound on My Trail" – 3:31
8. "Traveling Riverside Blues" – 4:08
9. "Malted Milk" – 3:12
10. "Milkcow's Calf Blues" – 3:32
11. "Drunken Hearted Man" – 3:22
12. "Cross Road Blues" – 2:56
13. "Come On in My Kitchen" (Johnson, Woody Payne) – 3:08
- Recorded at Roundel Studio, Kent; Zero 1 Studio; Battery Studios, New York City; Chicago Trax; and Different Fur Studio, San Francisco.

=== Bonus tracks (Japanese release) ===
1. "Terraplane Blues – 3:47
2. "Honeymoon Blues" – 3:04
- Recorded live at Ronnie Scott's Jazz Club, London on 5 April 1998. Both tracks were previously released on the Soho Session album in 1999.

== Personnel ==
=== Peter Green Splinter Group ===
- Peter Green – guitars, harmonica, vocals
- Nigel Watson – guitar, slide guitar, vocals
- Roger Cotton – guitar, piano
- Pete Stroud – acoustic bass guitar
- Larry Tolfree – drums, congas, percussion

=== Additional musicians ===
- Hubert Sumlin – guitar (track 3)
- Otis Rush – guitar (tracks 1, 4)
- Buddy Guy – guitar (track 12)
- David Honeyboy Edwards – guitar (track 8)
- Joe Louis Walker – guitar (track 8)
- Dr. John – piano (tracks 2, 5)

=== Technical ===
- Peter Green Splinter Group – producers
- Stuart Taylor – production coordinator (US)
- Roger Cotton, Matthew Ollivier, Bill Hill – engineers (Roundel Studio)
- Tim Donovan and Shane Stoneback – engineers (Battery Studios)
- Van Christie, Larry Sturm, Tom Arnold & Bryon Rickerson – engineers (Chicago Trax)
- Howard Johnson, Justin Lieberman – engineers (Different Fur)
- Martin Celmins – liner notes
- 9th Planet, London and the Lucky Mojo Curio Company, Forestville, California – design

== Charts ==
Chart (2000)	Position
UK Jazz & Blues Albums	2
UK Independent Albums	21
