= The Best of Peter Green Splinter Group =

Compilation album by Peter Green Splinter Group
- Released: 1 July 2002
- Recorded: 1996–2000
- Genre: Blues
- Length: 1:32:52
- Label: Madfish
- Producer: Peter Green Splinter Group

The Best of Peter Green Splinter Group is a compilation album by the British blues band the Peter Green Splinter Group, led by Peter Green. Released in 2002, this was a two-disc set. Green was the founder of Fleetwood Mac and a member of that group from 1967–70, before a sporadic solo career during the late 1970s and early 1980s. This compilation was re-released in 2006.

A different single-disc compilation with the same title and similar packaging but with a different play list was issued in 2019.

There was also a similar compilation called The Very Best of Peter Green Splinter Group, issued in 2012 with a different tracklisting.

== Track listing 2006 (2 CDs) ==
=== Disc 1 ===
1. "Burglar" (Nigel Watson) – 5:58
2. "I'm a Steady Rollin Man" (Robert Johnson) – 3:34
3. "Big Change Is Gonna Come" (Roger Cotton) – 5:04
4. "Phonograph Blues" (Johnson) – 3:29
5. "Help Me" (Sonny Boy Williamson) – 4:40
6. "Sweet Home Chicago" (Johnson) – 4:17
7. "Hitch Hiking Woman" (Black Ace) – 3:48
8. "Tribal Dance" (Peter Green) – 5:32
9. "Homework" (Otis Rush) – 3:42
10. "Love in Vain Blues" (Johnson) – 4:48
11. "You'll Be Sorry Someday" (Cotton) – 6:34
12. "Look on Yonder Wall" (Johnson) – 6:09
13. "Traveling Riverside Blues" (Johnson) – 4:09
14. "Going Down" (Don Nix) – 6:29
15. "Hiding in Shadows" (Cotton) – 4:40

=== Disc 2 ===
1. "Albatross" (Green) – 3:23
2. "The Green Manalishi" (Green) – 5:28
3. "Rattlesnake Shake" (Green) – 5:02
4. "The Supernatural" (Green) – 3:13
5. "Man of the World" (Green) – 3:05

== Track listing 2012 (2 CDs) ==
=== Disc 1 ===
1. Look on Yonder Wall
2. The Stumble
3. Steady Rollin' Man
4. It Takes Time
5. When You Got a Good Friend
6. Walkin' Blues
7. Ramblin' on My Mind
8. Me & The Devil Blues
9. Sweet Home Chicago
10. The Supernatural
11. Shake Your Hips
12. Last Fair Deal Gone Down
13. If I Had Possession Over Judgment Day
14. The Green Manalishi
15. Big Change Is Gonna Come
16. Heart of Stone

=== Disc 2 ===
1. Burglar
2. Hiding in the Shadows
3. Man of the World
4. Dead Shrimp Blues
5. Little Queen of Spades
6. Hot Tamales and They're Red Hot
7. Cross Road Blues
8. Come On in My Kitchen
9. Downsize Blues (Repossess My Body)
10. Feeling Good
11. Time Keeps Slipping Away
12. Underway
13. Ain't Nothin' Gonna Change It
14. Look Out for Yourself
15. Don't Walk Away
16. I'm Ready for You

== Track listing 2019 (1 CD) ==
1. Heart of Stone
2. I'm a Steady Rollin' Man (Feat. Otis Rush)
3. Big Change Is Gonna Come
4. Homework
5. When You Got a Good Friend
6. You'll Be Sorry Someday
7. Phonograph Blues
8. Love in Vain Blues
9. Burglar
10. From Four Till Late (Feat. Dr. John)
11. Hiding in Shadows
12. Sweet Home Chicago (Feat. Paul Rodgers)
13. Hitch-hiking Woman
14. Me and the Devil Blues
15. Goin' Down
16. Man of the World
17. Albatross

== Personnel ==
- Peter Green – guitars, vocals, harmonica
- Nigel Watson – guitars, vocals
- Neil Murray – bass guitar
- Pete Stroud – bass guitar
- Spike Edney – keyboards
- Roger Cotton – keyboards
- Cozy Powell – drums
- Larry Tolfree – drums

== Charts ==
Chart (2002)	Position
UK Jazz & Blues Albums	6
