= Destiny Road =

Studio album by Peter Green Splinter Group
- Released: 27 July 1999
- Recorded: 1999
- Studio: Jacobs Studios, Farnham, Surrey
- Genre: Blues
- Length: 66:10; 76:06 (with bonus tracks)
- Label: Snapper Music
- Producer: Pete Brown & The Splinter Group

Peter Green Splinter Group chronology
Soho Session (1999)	Destiny Road (1999)	Hot Foot Powder (2000)

Professional ratings
Review scores
Source	Rating
AllMusic	2.5/5 stars
The Penguin Guide to Blues Recordings	1.5/4 stars

Destiny Road is an album by the British blues band the Peter Green Splinter Group, led by Peter Green. Released in 1999, this was their fourth album. Green was the founder of Fleetwood Mac and a member of that group from 1967 to 1970, before a sporadic solo career during the late 1970s and early 1980s.

The album included a reworking of "Tribal Dance", which first featured on Green's 1979 solo album In the Skies, and also a new version of the Fleetwood Mac hit "Man of the World".

== Track listing ==
1. "Big Change Is Gonna Come" (Roger Cotton) – 5:04
2. "Say that You Want To" (Pete Stroud) – 4:02
3. "Heart of Stone" (Cotton) – 4:43
4. "You'll Be Sorry Someday" (Cotton) – 6:32
5. "Tribal Dance" (Peter Green) – 5:31
6. "Burglar" (Nigel Watson) – 5:55
7. "Turn Your Love Away" (Stroud) – 5:20
8. "Madison Blues" (Elmore James) – 3:40
9. "I Can't Help Myself" (Watson) – 7:00
10. "Indians" (Watson) – 4:59
11. "Hiding in Shadows" (Cotton) – 4:41
12. "There's a River" (Steve Winwood, Will Jennings) – 8:43
13. "Man of the World" (Green)
- Track 13 is a hidden track.
- Japanese versions of the album contained two extra tracks: "The Brave" and "Gambling Man".

== Personnel ==
=== Peter Green Splinter Group ===
- Peter Green – guitars, harmonica, vocals
- Nigel Watson – guitars, mandolin, vocals
- Roger Cotton – piano
- Pete Stroud – bass guitar
- Larry Tolfree – drums, congas, percussion

=== Additional musicians ===
- Jennie Evans, Debbie Miller – backing vocals
- Derek Nash, Joe Green – tenor saxophone
- Kate Shortt, Guy Theaker, Malcolm Allison, Naomi Fairhurst – strings

=== Technical ===
- Pete Brown and the Splinter Group – producers
- Matthew Ollivier – engineer
- Richard Wheatley – assistant engineer
- 9th Planet, London – design

== Charts ==
Chart (1999)	Position
UK Jazz & Blues Albums	2
UK Independent Albums	24
