= Watcha Gonna Do? =

Whatcha Gonna Do? may refer to:

- Watcha Gonna Do/Gathering The Words (Denny Doherty album), a 1971 album
- Whatcha Gonna Do? (Peter Green album), a 1981 album
- Whatcha Gonna Do? (Jayo Felony album) a 1998 album
- Watcha Gonna Do (Keisha White song)
- "Bad Boys" (Inner Circle song), a 1987 song that repeatedly uses the phrase, "Watcha gonna do?"
