= Soho Session =

Live album by Peter Green Splinter Group
- Released: 23 March 1999
- Recorded: 5 April 1998
- Venue: Ronnie Scott's Jazz Club, Soho, London
- Genre: Blues
- Length: 44:07 / 47:00
- Label: Snapper Music
- Producer: Arthur Anderson

Peter Green Splinter Group chronology
The Robert Johnson Songbook (1998)	Soho Session (1999)	Destiny Road (1999)

Professional ratings
Review scores
Source	Rating
Allmusic	2.5/5 stars

Soho Session is a live album by the British blues band the Peter Green Splinter Group, led by Peter Green. Released in 1999, this was their third album. Green was the founder of Fleetwood Mac and a member of that group from 1967 to 1970, before a sporadic solo career during the late 1970s and early 1980s.

Recorded on 5 April 1998 at Ronnie Scott's Jazz Club, the double album featured new versions of various songs from the group's previous albums, and also some of Green's Fleetwood Mac songs. On the same night, the group's previous drummer Cozy Powell was killed in a road accident.

This was the group's last album to feature bass guitarist Neil Murray.

== Track listing ==
=== Disc one ===
1. "It Takes Time" (Otis Rush) – 5:18
2. "Homework" (Dave Clark, Al Perkins) – 3:45
3. "Black Magic Woman" (Peter Green) – 7:13
4. "Indians" (Nigel Watson) – 4:08
5. "Hey Mama Keep Your Big Mouth Shut" (Ellas McDaniel) – 6:09
6. "The Supernatural" (Green) – 3:37
7. "Rattlesnake Shake" (Green) – 5:00
8. "Shake Your Hips" (Slim Harpo) – 5:16
9. "Albatross" (Green) – 3:32

The album incorrectly lists the composer of track 2 as Otis Rush. Rush was the first person to record the song in 1962, but did not compose it.

=== Disc two ===
1. "Travelling Riverside Blues" (Robert Johnson) – 3:59
2. "Steady Rollin' Man" (Johnson) – 3:33
3. "Terraplane Blues" (Johnson) – 3:47
4. "Honeymoon Blues" (Johnson) – 3:04
5. "Last Fair Deal Gone Down" (Johnson) – 3:19
6. "If I Had Possession Over Judgment Day" (Johnson) – 4:27
7. "The Green Manalishi (with the Two-Prong Crown)" (Green) – 5:38
8. "Goin’ Down" (Don Nix) – 7:36
9. "Help Me" (Sonny Boy Williamson) – 4:49
10. "Look on Yonder Wall" (Elmore James/Marshall Sehorn) – 6:48

== Personnel ==
- Peter Green – guitars, vocals, harmonica
- Nigel Watson – guitars, vocals
- Neil Murray – bass guitar
- Roger Cotton – piano, Hammond organ
- Larry Tolfree – drums
