= Goldtop: Groups & Sessions '74–'94 =

Compilation album by Snowy White
- Released: 1995
- Recorded: 1974–1994
- Genre: Blues rock
- Label: RPM 154

Professional ratings
Review scores
| Source | Rating |
|---|---|
| Allmusic | 3/5 stars |

Goldtop: Groups & Sessions '74–'94 is a compilation album by the British guitarist Snowy White, released in 1995. The album features solo recordings by White along with tracks that he recorded with various artists between 1974 and 1994.

Seven of the tracks were previously unissued, including the bridged version of "Pigs on the Wing" by Pink Floyd that had previously only been available on the 8-track version of Pink Floyd's Animals. It also includes instrumental rehearsal versions of "Slabo Day" and "In the Skies" with ex-Fleetwood Mac guitarist Peter Green. The album also includes recordings with Thin Lizzy, Al Stewart and Richard Wright. The track "Love, Pain and Sorrow" features David Gilmour, and "Highway to the Sun" features Chris Rea.

The title of the album refers to White's well-known Gibson Les Paul Standard guitar which has a gold-coloured finish.

== Track listing ==
1. "Highway to the Sun" – (Snowy White)
2. "Renegade" – (Thin Lizzy)
3. "The Time Has Come" – (Snowy White)
4. "Out of Order" – (Snowy White's Blues Agency)
5. "Pigs on the Wing" – (Pink Floyd, 8-track version)
6. "Drop in from the Top" – (Richard Wright)
7. "Judgment Day" (live) – (Snowy White)
8. "Love, Pain and Sorrow" – (Snowy White)
9. "Open for Business" – (Snowy White's Blues Agency)
10. "Dark and Rolling Sea" (live) – (Al Stewart, US Radio broadcast)
11. "Memory Pain" – (Thin Lizzy)
12. "The Answer" – (Snowy White)
13. "Slabo Day" – (Peter Green, rehearsal version)
14. "Carol" (live) – (Al Stewart, US Radio broadcast)
15. "Cat Flea Jump" – (Snowy White)
16. "In the Skies" – (Peter Green, rehearsal version)
17. "Bird of Paradise" – (Snowy White)

== Personnel ==
- Snowy White – guitar, vocals
- Chris Rea – guitar (track 1)
- Scott Gorham – guitar (track 2)
- Roger Waters – vocals, acoustic guitar (track 5)
- David Gilmour – guitar (track 8)
- Peter Green – guitar (tracks 13, 16)
- Graham Bell – vocals, harmonica (tracks 4, 9)
- Al Stewart – vocals, guitar (tracks 10, 14)
- Phil Lynott – bass guitar, vocals (tracks 2, 11)
- Kuma Harada – bass guitar, guitar (tracks 1, 3, 4, 7, 9, 12, 13, 15–17)
- Walter Latupeirissa – bass guitar (tracks 3, 8)
- Larry Steele – bass guitar (track 6)
- Charlie Harrison – bass guitar (tracks 10, 14)
- Mel Collins – saxophone (track 6)
- Rabbit Bundrick – keyboards (tracks 1, 3, 7, 8)
- Darren Wharton – keyboards (tracks 2, 11)
- Richard Wright – keyboards (tracks 5, 6)
- Peter Woods – keyboards (tracks 10, 14)
- Peter White – keyboards (tracks 10, 14)
- Godfrey Wang – keyboards (tracks 12, 17)
- Juan van Emmerloot – drums (tracks 1, 3, 8)
- Brian Downey – drums (tracks 2, 11)
- Jeff Allen – drums (tracks 4, 9, 15)
- Reg Isidore – drums (tracks 6, 13, 16)
- Steve Chapman – drums (tracks 10, 14)
- Richard Bailey – drums (tracks 12, 17)
