= It's Gonna Be Me (disambiguation) =

"It's Gonna Be Me" is a 2000 single by NSYNC.

It's Gonna Be Me may also refer to:

- "It's Gonna Be Me", a song by Peter Green from White Sky (1982)
- "It's Gonna Be Me", a 1974 song by David Bowie, first released on the 1991 reissue of Young Americans
- "It's Gonna Be Me", a song by Merle Haggard from I Am What I Am (2010)
