= Goldtop =

Goldtop may refer to:

- Goldtop: Groups & Sessions '74–'94, a 1995 compilation album by Snowy White
- Goldtop, a variation of the Gibson Les Paul guitar
- Gold top milk, or Channel Island milk
- Goldtop Recordings, an imprint of Jungle Records in collaboration with Goldtop Studio
- "Goldtop", a song by Inspiral Carpets from the 2007 album Keep the Circle: B-Sides and Udder Stuff
- the VH-60M "Gold Top" Black Hawk US Government executive transport helicopter, a part gold-painted heavily modified Black Hawk variant
