= Time Traders =

Studio album by Peter Green Splinter Group
- Released: 9 October 2001
- Recorded: 2001
- Studio: Roundel Studio, Kent; Kent And Jacob's Studios
- Genre: Blues
- Length: 64:34
- Label: Eagle Rock
- Producer: Peter Green Splinter Group

Peter Green Splinter Group chronology
Hot Foot Powder (2000)	Time Traders (2001)	Blues Don't Change (2001)

Professional ratings
Review scores
Source	Rating
Allmusic	3/5 stars

Time Traders is an album by the British blues band the Peter Green Splinter Group, led by Peter Green. Released in 2001, this was their sixth album. Green was the founder of Fleetwood Mac and a member of that group from 1967–70, before a sporadic solo career during the late 1970s and early 1980s.

Time Traders marked a departure from the group's prior recordings of Robert Johnson songs, and the tracks on this album were all original compositions by the band members, including two by Green that had been originally recorded three decades previously. "Underway" was an instrumental track from Fleetwood Mac's 1969 album, Then Play On, and "Uganda Woman" was the b-side of a single that Green and his Splinter Group colleague Nigel Watson had released in January 1972. "Underway" features Snowy White on guitar; White had previously performed on Green's In the Skies album in 1979.

== Track listing ==
1. "Until the Well Runs Dry" (Roger Cotton) – 5:19
2. "Real World" (Cotton) – 6:16
3. "Running After You" (Peter Stroud) – 4:46
4. "Shadow on My Door" (Nigel Watson) – 5:35
5. "Lies" (Cotton) – 4:43
6. "Down the Road of Temptation" (Stroud) – 4:16
7. "Downsize Blues (Repossess My Body)" (Watson) – 3:47
8. "Feeling Good" (Cotton) – 4:17
9. "Time Keeps Slipping Away" (Stroud) – 4:44
10. "Wild Dogs" (Watson) – 5:09
11. "Home" (Stroud) – 5:17
12. "Underway" (Peter Green) – 4:48
13. "Uganda Woman" (Watson) – 5:30

== Personnel ==
=== Peter Green Splinter Group ===
- Peter Green – guitars, harmonica, vocals
- Nigel Watson – guitar, vocals
- Roger Cotton – guitar, piano, Hammond C-3 organ
- Pete Stroud – bass guitar
- Larry Tolfree – drums, percussion

=== Additional musicians ===
- Snowy White – guitar (track 12)
- Tim Riggins – trombone, horn arrangements
- Martin Harmon – saxophone
- Derek Nash – saxophone
- Sid Gauld – trumpet, flugelhorn
- Joanne Ramsey, Louise Kenny, Owen Parker – backing vocals (track 13)

=== Technical ===
- Peter Green Splinter Group – producers
- Matthew Ollivier – engineer
- Stuart Green – design
- Monty Strikes – photography

== Charts ==
Chart (2001)	Position
UK Jazz & Blues Albums	2
