= Madison Blues =

Song written by Elmore James

Song by Elmore James

from the album Tough
- Released: 1968
- Recorded: April 14, 1960
- Genre: Blues
- Length: 2:22
- Label: Chess
- Songwriter: Elmore James
- Producers: Leonard Chess, Phil Chess

"Madison Blues" is a blues song by American blues musician Elmore James. It is an upbeat Chicago-style shuffle featuring James' amplified slide guitar and vocal. He recorded it in 1960 for Chess Records, during a session that also produced "Talk to Me Baby" ("I Can't Hold Out") and "The Sun Is Shining", a follow-up to his popular single "The Sky Is Crying".

== Background ==
James recorded the song with his long-time backup band, the Broomdusters: tenor saxophonist J. T. Brown, pianist Little Johnny Jones, and second guitarist Homesick James, with drummer Odie Payne. It is a twelve-bar blues notated in 4/4 time in the key of D and includes a twelve-bar slide-guitar intro and two twelve-bar sections with Brown's sax solo. The chorus makes a pun on "blues":

Put on your Madison blues shoes (2×)
I've got the Madison blues, now put on your Madison blue shoes

Music writer Don Snowden describes the session as "showcas[ing] his mature style—the trademark bottleneck guitar licks and raw-edged, gritty vocals complemented by J. T. Brown's braying sax solos, tinkling piano by Johnnie Jones and Odie Payne's tough, propulsive drumming." The song was not issued as a single, but was later included on the Elmore James–John Brim compilation albums Tough (Blue Horizon, UK, 1968), and Whose Muddy Shoes (Chess, US, 1969).

== Other versions ==
Several musicians have recorded their renditions of the song, including Fleetwood Mac, who recorded it with Willie Dixon and J. T. Brown for their 1969 Blues Jam in Chicago album with slide and vocals by Jeremy Spencer. George Thorogood and the Destroyers also recorded it for their eponymous 1977 debut album. Original Fleetwood Mac guitarist Peter Green, recorded a version for his 1999 release Destiny Road. Both Fleetwood Mac and Thorogood have recorded live versions of the song.
