= The End of the Game =

Studio album by Peter Green
- Released: December 1970
- Recorded: May–June 1970
- Genre: Instrumental rock; jazz fusion
- Length: 33:17
- Label: Reprise
- Producer: Peter Green

Peter Green chronology
The End of the Game (1970)	In the Skies (1979)

Professional ratings
Review scores
Source	Rating
AllMusic	1/5 stars
Christgau's Record Guide	D
Piero Scaruffi	8/10 stars

The End of the Game is an album by British blues rock musician Peter Green, who was the founder of Fleetwood Mac and a member from 1967 to 1970. Released in 1970, this was his first solo album, recorded in June of that year, only a month after leaving Fleetwood Mac.

The style of this album is a radical departure from his work with Fleetwood Mac, consisting of edited pieces of a long studio jam. The jam was experimental and free-form, and the six tracks taken from it have very loose or non-existent musical structure, with all the tracks being instrumentals. Apart from Green's two singles from this period, "Heavy Heart" / "No Way Out" and "Beasts Of Burden" / "Uganda Woman" (recorded with Nigel Watson), this album bears little resemblance to any of Green's other recorded work. These four songs were later included on the 2020 edition of the album.

== Critical reception ==
The album obtained mixed reviews. It appeared in a book of the "500 fundamental rock albums" written by the Italian music critics Eddy Cilìa and Federico Guglielmi and obtained a rating of 8/10 in Piero Scaruffi's The History of Rock Music website. AllMusic gave it one star out of five, calling it "directionless jamming...[with] no coherent vision...It's drivel, from an immensely talented guitarist." Robert Christgau remarked, "Maybe [Green] has lost his marbles." Roy Hollingworth of Melody Maker was more favorable of the album's merits. He praised the musicianship of Green's backing band and thought that the album was "twice as good as anything he did with Fleetwood Mac."

== Track listing ==
- All tracks composed by Peter Green

Side one

1. "Bottoms Up" – 9:05
2. "Timeless Time" – 2:37
3. "Descending Scale" – 8:17

Side two

1. "Burnt Foot" – 5:16
2. "Hidden Depth" – 4:54
3. "The End of the Game" – 5:08

2020 CD reissue bonus tracks:

1. Heavy Heart
2. No Way Out
3. Beasts of Burden
4. Uganda Woman

== Personnel ==
- Peter Green – guitar
- Zoot Money – piano
- Nick Buck – keyboards
- Alex Dmochowski – bass guitar
- Godfrey McLean – drums, percussion

== Production ==
- Produced by Peter Green
- Recording engineer – Martin Birch
- Cover design by Afracadabra
- Photographs – Keystone

== Charts ==
Chart (2020)	Peak position
UK Independent Albums (OCC)	40
