= Reaching the Cold 100 =

Studio album by Peter Green Splinter Group
- Released: 24 February 2003
- Studio: Roundel Studios, Kent, England
- Genre: Blues
- Length: 79:02
- Label: Eagle Rock
- Producer: Peter Green Splinter Group

Peter Green Splinter Group chronology
Blues Don't Change (2001)	Reaching the Cold 100 (2003)

Professional ratings
Review scores
Source	Rating
Allmusic	3.5/5 stars
The Penguin Guide to Blues Recordings	2/4 stars

Reaching the Cold 100 is an album recorded by the British blues band the Peter Green Splinter Group, led by Peter Green. Released in 2003, this was their eighth and final album. Green was the founder of Fleetwood Mac and a member of that group from 1967 to 1970, before a sporadic solo career during the late 1970s and early 1980s. This album is the only charting album by the group, at number 11 on the Billboard Blues album chart in March 2003.

The album was recorded at the Roundel Studios, Kent, England, owned by Roger Cotton who also played on the album and composed some of the tracks.

== Track listing ==
1. "Ain't Nothin' Gonna Change It" (Roger Cotton) – 3:28
2. "Look Out for Yourself" (Pete Stroud) – 4:29
3. "Cool Down" (Owen Parker, Nigel Watson) – 3:59
4. "Dangerous Man" (Cotton) – 4:06
5. "Needs Must the Devil Drives" (Parker, Watson) – 4:16
6. "Must Be a Fool" (Stroud) – 4:33
7. "Don't Walk Away" (Cotton) – 4:32
8. "Can You Tell Me Why (a.k.a. Legal Fee Blues)" (Parker, Watson) – 3:49
9. "Spiritual Thief" (Parker, Watson) – 4:57
10. "I'm Ready for You" (Stroud) – 4:39
11. "Smile" (Parker, Watson) – 5:17
12. "Nice Girl Like You" (Cotton) – 4:36
13. "When Somebody Cares" (Parker, Watson) – 5:26

Bonus EP

1. "Black Magic Woman" (Peter Green) – 6:51
2. "It Takes Time" (Otis Rush) – 5:27
3. "Green Manalishi" (Green) – 4:43
4. "Albatross" (Green) – 3:24

Some later versions including digital media (e.g. Eagle Rock version in 2003) do not include the bonus EP tracks.

== Personnel ==
=== Peter Green Splinter Group ===
- Peter Green – guitars, harmonica, vocals
- Nigel Watson – guitar, vocals
- Roger Cotton – guitar, keyboards, Hammond C-3 organ
- Pete Stroud – bass guitar, double bass
- Larry Tolfree – drums, percussion

=== Technical ===
- Peter Green Splinter Group – producers
- Arthur Anderson – producer, engineer
- Richard "Occy" Oxley – engineer
- Monty Strikes – photography

== Charts ==
Chart (2003)	Position
UK Jazz & Blues Albums	3
UK Independent Albums	18
