= Katmandu (band) =

UK musical group

- Origin: London
- Genres: Blues
- Years active: 1983–84
- Labels: Night Life
- Past members: Peter Green; Ray Dorset; Vincent Crane; Jeff Whittaker; Len Surtees; Greg Terry-Short

Katmandu were a short-lived British blues supergroup, formed in 1983, featuring Peter Green, Ray Dorset, Len Surtees and Vincent Crane. After releasing one album, the group split the following year.

== Formation ==
Katmandu were formed when ex-Fleetwood Mac leader Peter Green became dissatisfied with his solo career and his band Kolors, and looked to form a new band with new musicians. Retaining Kolors percussionist Jeff Whittaker, he made contact with former Mungo Jerry frontman Ray Dorset through a mutual acquaintance, and they met up at Dorset's Satellite Studio, where he was running a video and commercials production company. During a jam session, one of Dorset's clients from a Swiss company made an offer to fund recording sessions and an album, providing £120,000 for this purpose.

== Recording and split ==
Green, Dorset and Whittaker were joined by former Atomic Rooster keyboardist Vincent Crane, along with bassist Len Surtees (ex-The Nashville Teens) and drummer Greg Terry-Short (ex-Ozzy Osbourne), and recorded an album during December 1983 and January 1984. A Case for the Blues was not released until 1985, but by then the group had already split up. According to Whittaker, Green had enjoyed recording the album but became disillusioned over Dorset's handling of the group's finances and refused to work with him again. Green reformed his band Kolors in the summer of 1984, retaining Whittaker and Terry-Short, but by the end of the year the band had disintegrated, and Green began a period of 12 years of musical inactivity. Thus the Katmandu project represents Green's last recorded work before the Peter Green Splinter Group's first album in 1997, apart from one track recorded with Mick Green in 1986.

== Later releases ==
A Case for the Blues has been re-released several times, sometimes as a Peter Green solo album, such as the 1987 release on the Original Masters label. Other releases credit the album to Peter Green and Friends.

== Personnel ==
- Peter Green – vocals, guitar, harmonica, drums
- Ray Dorset – vocals, guitar, bass guitar, harmonica
- Vincent Crane – keyboards
- Len Surtees – bass guitar
- Greg Terry-Short – drums
- Jeff Whittaker – vocals, percussion, drums
