= Blues Don't Change =

Studio album by Peter Green Splinter Group
- Released: 2001
- Recorded: 2000
- Studio: Roundel Studio, Kent
- Genre: Blues
- Length: 46:36
- Label: Eagle Rock
- Producer: Peter Green Splinter Group

Peter Green Splinter Group chronology
Time Traders (2001)	Blues Don't Change (2001)	Reaching the Cold 100 (2003)

Professional ratings
Review scores
Source	Rating
Allmusic	3/5 stars

Blues Don't Change is an album by the British blues band the Peter Green Splinter Group, led by Peter Green. Originally released in 2001 and only available at concerts or via the band's official website, this was their seventh album. It was later given a full release on 3 April 2006, and again in 2012. Green was the founder of Fleetwood Mac and a member of that group from 1967 to 1970, before a sporadic solo career during the late 1970s and early 1980s.

The opening track, "I Believe My Time Ain't Long", is a variation on the Robert Johnson song "Dust My Broom". Green had first recorded the track with Fleetwood Mac in 1967 (variously credited to Elmore James or Jeremy Spencer), and it had been released as the band's first single.

== Track listing ==
1. "I Believe My Time Ain't Long" (Robert Johnson) – 3:38
2. "Take Out Some Insurance" (Charles Singleton, Waldense Hall) – 3:42
3. "When It All Comes Down" (Will Jennings, Joe Sample) – 4:20
4. "Honey Bee" (Muddy Waters) – 4:09
5. "Little Red Rooster" (Willie Dixon) – 3:54
6. "Don't Start Me Talking" (Sonny Boy Williamson II) – 3:04
7. "Nobody Knows You When You're Down and Out" (Jimmy Cox) – 4:25
8. "Help Me Through the Day" (Leon Russell) – 5:15
9. "Honest I Do" (Jimmy Reed, Ewart Abner) – 3:29
10. "Blues Don't Change" (Mack Rice, John Gary Williams) – 4:56
11. "Crawlin' King Snake" (John Lee Hooker, Bernard Besman) – 5:44

== Personnel ==
=== Peter Green Splinter Group ===
- Peter Green – guitars, harmonica, vocals
- Nigel Watson – guitar, vocals
- Roger Cotton – keyboards
- Pete Stroud – bass guitar
- Larry Tolfree – drums, percussion

=== Technical ===
- Peter Green Splinter Group – producers
- Matthew Ollivier – engineer

== Charts ==
Chart (2012 reissue)	Position
UK Jazz & Blues Albums	2
UK Independent Albums	22
