= George Thorogood and the Destroyers (album) =

Studio album by George Thorogood and the Destroyers
- Released: August 16, 1977 (US); June 1978 (UK)
- Recorded: 1976–1977
- Studios: Dimension Sound Studios, Boston, Massachusetts
- Genres: Blues rock; boogie rock
- Length: 45:10
- Label: Rounder
- Producer: Ken Irwin

George Thorogood and the Destroyers chronology
George Thorogood and the Destroyers (1977)	Move It On Over (1978)

Singles from George Thorogood and the Destroyers
- 1. "Can't Stop Lovin'" / "Homesick Boy" Released: 1977; 2. "Madison Blues" Released: 1978; 3. "One Bourbon, One Scotch, One Beer" Released: 1978; 4. "Ride On Josephine" Released: 1978

George Thorogood and the Destroyers is the self-titled debut studio album by American blues rock band George Thorogood and the Destroyers. It was released in 1977 by the label Rounder Records. Consisting mostly of covers of blues hits, it includes a medley of John Lee Hooker's "House Rent Boogie" and "One Bourbon, One Scotch, One Beer", the latter a song written by Rudy Toombs for Amos Milburn, and later covered by Hooker.

In 2015 Rounder Records released a new remix of the original album under the name George Thorogood and the Delaware Destroyers.

== Background ==
George Thorogood formed the Delaware Destroyers in 1973, together with high school friend and drummer Jeff Simon. The band went through several lineup changes, before eventually settling on Thorogood and Ron "Roadblock" Smith on guitars, Simon on drums, and Billy Blough on bass. In July 1975, the band was discovered by John Forward, and he helped them secure a recording contract with Rounder Records. Recording of the album began shortly after.

Recording of the album took place at the Dimension Sound Studios in Boston. The cost for recording the album was just $5,000.

== Songs ==
The album mostly consists of covers of old blues hits, but also contains two originals, written by Thorogood.

=== Side one ===
"You Got To Lose" was written by Earl Hooker, while "Madison Blues" and "Can't Stop Lovin'", were written by Elmore James. "Madison Blues" was the first song the Destroyers had played together as a band, and quickly become a concert staple. The song is titled "One Bourbon, One Scotch, One Beer", but is a medley of that song preceded by "House Rent Boogie", also called "John L's House Rent Boogie". The songwriter is credited as John Lee Hooker, who was indeed the author of "House Rent Boogie". John Lee Hooker's version of the "One Bourbon" half of the medley was used by Thorogood and Rudy Toombs, the writer of the original "One Bourbon" was not credited on the album. "Kind Hearted Woman", written by Robert Johnson, is a country-blues ballad with acoustic guitar and mournful vocals.

=== Side two ===
Side two opens with "Ride On Josephine", written by Ellas McDaniel, better known as Bo Diddley. "Homesick Boy" is one of the two originals, written by Thorogood. "John Hardy" is a traditional song, based on the real-life killing of a man named Thomas Drews, after he got into an argument with a man named John Hardy. "I'll Change My Style" is a ballad written by William Parker and Manuel Villa. The album's closer is "Delaware Slide," the second original by Thorogood.

== Release ==
Rounder Records released George Thorogood and the Destroyers on August 16, 1977. The album had been shelved for either six, or eighteen months, because the album had no cover. "Can't Stop Lovin'" was released as a single, with "Homesick Boy" as its B-Side. "Madison Blues" was released as a single in 1978.

Rounder Records expected the album to sell just 5,000 copies, with an initial order of just 750 copies, but the album ended up selling between 40,000 and 60,000 copies by 1978, and by 1980, the album sold more than 300,000 copies. As of 1992, the album has sold more than 500,000 copies in the United States.

=== 2015 remix ===
In 2015 Rounder released George Thorogood and the Delaware Destroyers, a new remix of the album featuring the three-piece band as originally recorded and mixed. It omits the bass overdubs by Billy Blough, which were added after the original recording sessions. It also adds the previously unreleased Elmore James track "Goodbye Baby".

== Critical reception ==
George Thorogood and the Destroyers received positive reviews from critics.

Professional ratings
Review scores
Source	Rating
AllMusic	4/5 stars
All Music Guide to the Blues	5/5 stars
Christgau's Record Guide	B
Daily Vault	B
DownBeat	4/5 stars
PopMatters	6/10
The Penguin Guide to Blues Recordings	3/4 stars
Rip It Up	(unrated)
The Rolling Stone Jazz & Blues Album Guide	3.5/5 stars
The Virgin Encyclopedia of the Blues	3/5 stars

A Cashbox reviewer wrote "Thorogood deals strongly in early '50s style rock and timeless blues and this album captures him at his slidin', pickin', wailin' best." Billboard magazine wrote "Rocking rhythm and blues, accented by the slide guitar, gives the album a nostalgic '60s sound. Rhythm section backup is tight while the vocals, though somewhat strained, are distinctive enough to stand out."

AllMusic's Stephen Thomas Erlewine says "this album isn't about groove and it's certainly not about virtuosity – it's about bashing out the blues at a punishing volume, and their lack of subtlety is why this 1977 debut still sounds powerful years after its release." David Bowling of Daily Vault wrote "George Thorogood and the Destroyers did not change the course of American blues or rock 'n' roll but it made them a bit more enjoyable. It is an album for the beer hall or smoky night club."

== Track listing ==
=== Original release ===
Side one
No.	Title	Writer(s)	Length
1.	"You Got to Lose"	Earl Hooker	3:15
2.	"Madison Blues"	Elmore James	4:24
3.	"One Bourbon, One Scotch, One Beer"	John Lee Hooker	8:20
4.	"Kind Hearted Woman"	Robert Johnson	4:21
5.	"Can't Stop Lovin'"	Elmore James	3:04

Side two
No.	Title	Writer(s)	Length
1.	"Ride On Josephine"	Ellas McDaniel	4:17
2.	"Homesick Boy"	George Thorogood	3:02
3.	"John Hardy"	Traditional	3:18
4.	"I'll Change My Style"	William Parker, Manuel Villa	3:57
5.	"Delaware Slide"	George Thorogood	7:45
Total length:			45:10

=== George Thorogood and the Delaware Destroyers (2015) ===
George Thorogood and the Delaware Destroyers track listing
No.	Title	Writer(s)	Length
1.	"You Got to Lose"	Earl Hooker	3:25
2.	"Madison Blues"	Elmore James	4:28
3.	"One Bourbon, One Scotch, One Beer"	John Lee Hooker	8:30
4.	"Kind Hearted Woman" (*)	Robert Johnson	4:23
5.	"Ride On Josephine"	Ellas McDaniel	4:24
6.	"Can't Stop Lovin'"	Elmore James	3:36
7.	"Homesick Boy"	George Thorogood	3:16
8.	"John Hardy" (*)	Traditional	3:33
9.	"I'll Change My Style"	William Parker, Manuel Villa	4:09
10.	"Delaware Slide"	George Thorogood	8:05
11.	"Goodbye Baby"	Elmore James	3:27
Total length:			51:16

(*) Tracks omitted from the vinyl release

== Personnel ==
=== Musicians ===
- George Thorogood – lead guitar, slide guitar, vocals; harmonica on "John Hardy"
- Ron "Roadblock" Smith – rhythm guitar
- Billy Blough – bass guitar
- Jeff Simon – drums

=== Technical ===
- Ken Irwin – producer
- John Nagy – engineer
- Susan Marsh – design
- Henry Horenstein – photography (front cover)
- Sam Clover – photography (back cover)

== Charts ==
Chart (1978)	Peak position
Australia (Kent Music Report)	52
UK Albums (OCC)	67

== Certifications and sales ==
Region	Certification	Certified units/sales
Canada (Music Canada)	Platinum	80,000^{^}
United States (RIAA)	Gold	500,000^{^}

^{^} Shipments figures based on certification alone.
