= The Robert Johnson Songbook =

Studio album by Peter Green Splinter Group
- Released: 19 May 1998
- Recorded: September 1997
- Studio: KD's Studio, Acton, London
- Genre: Blues
- Length: 53:25
- Label: Snapper Music; Artisan
- Producer: Kenny Denton, Nigel Watson & Peter Green

Peter Green Splinter Group chronology
Peter Green Splinter Group (1997)	The Robert Johnson Songbook (1998)	Soho Session (1999)

Professional ratings
Review scores
Source	Rating
Allmusic	2/5 stars

The Robert Johnson Songbook is an album by the British blues band the Peter Green Splinter Group, led by Peter Green. Released in 1998, this was their second album. Green was the founder of Fleetwood Mac and a member of that group from 1967–70, before a sporadic solo career during the late 1970s and early 1980s.

The album consists of songs composed by legendary blues artist Robert Johnson, and featured a guest appearance by Paul Rodgers, ex-lead vocalist of Free and Bad Company, who later worked with Queen.

This was the first Splinter Group album to feature Roger Cotton and Larry Tolfree, after the departure of Cozy Powell and Spike Edney. The album won a WC Handy Award in 1999 for "Best Comeback Album".

== Track listing ==
1. "When You Got a Good Friend"
2. "32-20 Blues"
3. "Phonograph Blues"
4. "Last Fair Deal Gone Down"
5. "Stop Breakin' Down Blues"
6. "Terraplane Blues"
7. "Walkin' Blues"
8. "Love in Vain Blues"
9. "Ramblin' on My Mind"
10. "Stones in My Passway"
11. "Me and the Devil Blues"
12. "Honeymoon Blues"
13. "Kind Hearted Woman Blues"
14. "I Believe I'll Dust My Broom"
15. "If I Had Possession over Judgment Day"
16. "Sweet Home Chicago"
- All tracks written by Robert Johnson.
- Track 16 recorded at Lartington Hall Studios by Andrew Scarth

== Personnel ==
=== Splinter Group ===
- Peter Green – guitars, vocals, harmonica
- Nigel Watson – guitars, vocals
- Neil Murray – bass guitar
- Roger Cotton – piano
- Larry Tolfree – drums
- Paul Rodgers – vocals (track 16)
- Street Angels '98 – backing vocals

=== Technical ===
- Kenny Denton – producer
- Andrew Scarth – engineer
- Tonic Communications – design

== Charts ==
Chart (1998)	Position
UK Albums	57
UK Jazz & Blues Albums	1
UK Independent Albums	10
Scotland	100
