= Peter Green Splinter Group (album) =

Live album by Peter Green Splinter Group
- Released: 1997
- Recorded: December 1996
- Studio: Fleetwood Mobile
- Genre: Blues
- Length: 54:58; 60:20 (with bonus track)
- Label: Snapper Music

Peter Green Splinter Group chronology
Peter Green Splinter Group (1997)	The Robert Johnson Songbook (1998)

Peter Green Splinter Group is an album by the British blues band of the same name, led by Peter Green. Released in 1997, this was their first album, and the comeback album for Green, who had been out of the music business for around 10 years. Green was the founder of Fleetwood Mac and a member of that group from 1967–70, before a sporadic solo career during the late 1970s and early 1980s.

Mostly recorded live on a tour of the UK, the album consisted of covers of blues songs.

== Critical reception ==
Professional ratings
Review scores
Source	Rating
AllMusic	3/5 stars
The Encyclopedia of Popular Music	2/5 stars
The Penguin Guide to Blues Recordings	3/4 stars
Uncut	3/5 stars

The Independent wrote: "His guitar-playing, while understandably lacking the extreme sensitivity of his work with Fleetwood Mac, is still a matter of wonder, both on the acoustic versions of Robert Johnson songs and the electric readings of Freddie King material which furnish the album's best tracks."

== Track listing ==
1. "Hitch Hiking Woman" (Black Ace) – 3:46 (studio recording)
2. "Travelling Riverside Blues" (Robert Johnson) – 3:26 (studio recording)
3. "Look on Yonder Wall" (Elmore James) – 6:26
4. "Homework" (Dave Clark, Al Perkins) – 3:56
5. "The Stumble" (Freddie King, Sonny Thompson) – 4:22
6. "Help Me" (Sonny Boy Williamson II, Willie Dixon, Ralph Bass) – 5:47
7. "Watch Your Step" (Bobby Parker) – 3:51
8. "From 4' Till Late" (Johnson) – 2:55
9. "Steady Rollin' Man" (Johnson) – 3:41
10. "It Takes Time" (Otis Rush) – 5:06
11. "Dark End of the Street" (Dan Penn, Chips Moman) – 3:59
12. "Going Down" (Don Nix) – 7:43

The album incorrectly lists the composer of track 4 as Otis Rush. Rush was the first person to record the song in 1962, but did not compose it.

=== Japanese issue bonus track ===
1. "The Green Manalishi" (Peter Green)

== Personnel ==
Peter Green Splinter Group

- Peter Green – guitars, vocals
- Nigel Watson – guitars, vocals
- Cozy Powell – drums
- Neil Murray – bass guitar
- Spike Edney – keyboards

Technical

- Tim Summerhayes, Robin Black, Ian Dyekhoff – engineers
- Spike Edney – remix engineer at Blackbarn Studios
- Al at Spot On – design
- Will Riley of Underworld – logo

== Charts ==
Chart (1997)	Position
UK	71
