= The Guitar Show =

Annual guitar exhibition held in United Kingdom

Coordinates: 52°29′43″N 1°55′05″W

The Guitar Show is a guitar exhibition held annually in Cranmore Park, Birmingham, United Kingdom.

The show typically invites multiple guitar brands to show their latest releases for the coming year, such as Fender, Gibson, Marshall, Orange, Blackstar, Laney, and Ibanez. The show also invites a number of artists. For example, the 2016 show featured Thin Lizzy and Black Star Riders guitarist Scott Gorham, who did a meet and greet on the Marshall Amplification stand.

== Competitions ==
The 2016 show offered a number of prizes and competitions. Among these was a competition to "Beat the Devil" in a guitar duel on the Ernie Ball Musicman stage.
