= A Case for the Blues =

Studio album by Katmandu
- Released: 1985
- Recorded: December 1983–January 1984
- Genre: Blues
- Length: 42:48
- Label: Night Life
- Producer: Katmandu, Ray Dorset, Ken Marshall

Peter Green chronology
Kolors (1983)	A Case for the Blues (1985)

A Case for the Blues is a blues album by Katmandu, a British band made up of successful musicians from differing musical backgrounds, including Peter Green of Fleetwood Mac, Ray Dorset of Mungo Jerry and Vincent Crane of Atomic Rooster. Released in 1985, this was the only album by the band.

A Case for the Blues has been re-released several times, sometimes as a Peter Green solo album, such as the 1987 release on the Original Masters label. Other releases credit the album to Peter Green and Friends.

== Track listing ==
No.	Title	Writer(s)	Length
1.	"Dust My Broom"	Elmore James	4:21
2.	"One More Night Without You"	Ray Dorset	5:28
3.	"Crane's Train Boogie"	Vincent Crane	3:18
4.	"Boogie All the Way"	Dorset	4:29
5.	"Zulu Gone West"	Jeff Whittaker	3:12
6.	"Blowing All My Troubles Away"	Dorset	5:22
7.	"Strangers Blues"	Peter Green	4:54
8.	"Sweet Sixteen"	Crane	3:32
9.	"Who's That Knocking"	Crane, Dorset, Green, Whittaker	4:20
10.	"The Case"	Whittaker	3:39

== Personnel ==
- Peter Green – vocals, guitar, harmonica, drums
- Ray Dorset – vocals, guitar, bass guitar, harmonica
- Vincent Crane – keyboards
- Len Surtees – bass guitar
- Greg Terry-Short – drums
- Jeff Whittaker – vocals, percussion, drums
