= White Sky =

Studio album by Peter Green
- Released: June 1982
- Recorded: May 1981
- Studio: Ridge Farm Studios, Rusper, UK
- Genre: Blues rock; rock
- Length: 42:16
- Label: Creole
- Producer: Peter Green & Geoff Robinson

Peter Green chronology
Whatcha Gonna Do? (1981)	White Sky (1982)	Kolors (1983)

Singles from White Sky
- 1. "The Clown" Released: 11 June 1982

Professional ratings
Review scores
Source	Rating
Allmusic	2/5 stars

White Sky is an album by British blues rock musician Peter Green, who was the founder of Fleetwood Mac and a member from 1967–70. Released in 1982, this was his fifth solo album, and the first for Creole Records after his split from PVK Records.

Ronnie Johnson, who played rhythm guitar on the album, recalled that Green was "very together and playing extremely well" on certain recording dates. Green experimented with different sounds from a Marshall amplifier connected to a Leslie speaker on some songs.

== Track listing ==
=== LP and original CD ===
- All the tracks were written by Peter's brother, Mike Green, except as noted.
1. "Time for Me to Go" – 3:54
2. "Shining Star" – 3:10
3. "The Clown" – 6:05
4. "White Sky (Love That Evil Woman)" – 8:50
5. "It's Gonna Be Me" – 3:36
6. "Born on the Wild Side" – 3:02
7. "Fallin' Apart" – 3:54
8. "Indian Lover" – 3:36
9. "Just Another Guy" – 6:06

=== Remastered 2005 CD release ===
1. "Time for Me to Go" – 3:54
2. "Shining Star" – 3:10
3. "The Clown" – 6:05
4. "White Sky (Love That Evil Woman)" – 8:50
5. "Funky Jam" (Peter Green) – 8:14
6. "It's Gonna Be Me" – 3:36
7. "Born on the Wild Side" – 3:02
8. "Fallin' Apart" – 3:54
9. "Indian Lover" – 3:36
10. "Just Another Guy" – 6:06
11. "Touch My Spirit" – 3:47
12. "Big Boy Now" – 5:55
13. "Corners of My Mind" – 3:47
14. "Carry My Love" – 5:00
15. "Just Another Guy" (vocal version) – 5:53

== Personnel ==
=== Musicians ===
- Peter Green – rhythm guitar, lead guitar, vocals
- Mike Green – vocals on track 4
- Ronnie Johnson – rhythm guitar, lead guitar (end of 3)
- Larry Steele – bass guitar
- Webster Johnson – keyboards
- Reg Isidore – drums
- Jeff Whittaker – percussion

=== Technical ===
- Peter Green & Jeff Robinson – producers
- Simon Heyworth – engineer, mixing
- Peter Cormack – executive producer
- Wally Marsh – sleeve illustration

== Charts ==
Chart performance for "White Sky"
Chart (1982)	Peak position
Swedish Albums (Sverigetopplistan)	35
