= Peter Green Splinter Group =

British band

The Peter Green Splinter Group were a blues band formed in 1996, fronted by guitarist and singer Peter Green.

Green was the leader of Fleetwood Mac until 1970. He suffered a mental breakdown during the 1970s and was rehabilitated with the aid of Nigel Watson, Cozy Powell and other friends. He subsequently began touring and recording with the Splinter Group and released a series of albums. The group was disbanded in early 2004 with Green's departure from the group – an upcoming tour was cancelled, as was the planned release of a new album.

== Band members ==
- Peter Green – vocals, lead guitar, slide guitar, harmonica
- Nigel Watson – vocals, lead guitar, rhythm guitar
- Spike Edney – keyboards (1996–1997)
- Neil Murray – bass guitar (1996–98)
- Cozy Powell – drums (1996–1997)
- Larry Tolfree – drums, percussion (1997–2004)
- Roger Cotton – piano, Hammond C3, rhythm guitar (1998–2004)
- Pete Stroud – fretless and fretted bass guitars, double bass (1998–2004)

== Discography ==
Studio albums

- The Robert Johnson Songbook (1998)
- Destiny Road (1999)
- Hot Foot Powder (2000)
- Time Traders (2001)
- Blues Don't Change (2001)
- Reaching the Cold 100 (2003)

Live albums

- Peter Green Splinter Group (1997)
- Soho Session (1999)

Other appearances

- "Midnight" – for Twang! A Tribute to Hank Marvin & the Shadows (1996)

Compilations

- Me and the Devil (2001) (box set of The Robert Johnson Songbook, Hot Foot Powder and a disc of Robert Johnson tracks)
- The Best of Peter Green Splinter Group (2006)
- The Very Best of Peter Green Splinter Group (2013)

DVD

- An Evening With Peter Green Splinter Group in Concert (2003)
