= Nigel Watson =

- Born: Nigel Jerome Edwin Watson; 24 September 1947; London, England
- Died: 16 February 2019 (aged 71)
- Genres: Blues rock, blues
- Occupations: Musician, songwriter
- Instruments: Vocals, guitar, conga
- Years active: 1970–2015
- Labels: Reprise, Eagle, Snapper Music

Nigel Jerome Edwin Watson (24 September 1947 – 16 February 2019) was an English guitarist best known for his work with ex-Fleetwood Mac guitarist Peter Green.

== Career ==
After Green left Fleetwood Mac in 1970, he worked with Watson on two solo singles, "Heavy Heart" and "Beasts of Burden", the latter being credited to both musicians. Watson also accompanied Green as conga player on a tour of the United States with Fleetwood Mac in February and March 1971. Jeremy Spencer had suddenly left the band and they asked Green to fill in and help them fulfil their tour obligations. Watson was at that time the brother-in-law of Fleetwood Mac's manager Clifford Davis.

In 1996, Watson and Green started working together again, and Watson was influential in persuading Green to return to music after he had been musically idle for several years. They formed the Peter Green Splinter Group, and released several albums over the following few years until the group split in 2004. Green was not always comfortable taking centre-stage when playing live, and Watson provided an extra focus onstage, singing as well as playing lead guitar. He also composed many songs recorded for the albums.

He died on 16 February 2019.

== Discography ==
=== Singles ===
- Peter Green – "Heavy Heart" / "No Way Out" (1970) Reprise K14082
- Nigel Watson and Peter Green – "Beasts of Burden" / "Uganda Woman" (January 1972) Reprise K14141

=== With the Peter Green Splinter Group ===
- Peter Green Splinter Group (1997)
- The Robert Johnson Songbook (1998)
- Soho Session (1999)
- Destiny Road (1999)
- Hot Foot Powder (2000)
- Time Traders (2001)
- Blues Don't Change (2001)
- The Best of Peter Green Splinter Group (2002 compilation)
- Reaching the Cold 100 (2003)
