= Little Dreamer (Peter Green album) =

Studio album by Peter Green
- Released: April 1980
- Recorded: Late autumn 1979
- Studios: Rock City, Surrey
- Genre: Blues rock
- Length: 43:18
- Label: PVK
- Producer: Peter Vernon-Kell

Peter Green chronology
| In the Skies (1979) | Little Dreamer (1980) | Whatcha Gonna Do? (1981) |

Singles from Little Dreamer
- 1. "Loser Two Times" Released: June 1980 (Europe only)

Little Dreamer is an album by the British blues rock musician Peter Green, who was the founder of Fleetwood Mac and a member from 1967 to 1970. Released in 1980, this was his third solo album, and the second in his 'middle period' of the late 1970s and early 1980s.

Most of the tracks on the album were written by Green's brother Mike.

== Critical reception ==
Professional ratings
Review scores
| Source | Rating |
|---|---|
| AllMusic | 3/5 stars |
| Music Week | 4/4 stars |

The Globe and Mail wrote that the album "is late-night guitar music, a rocker's answer to the mellow jazz guitar of Jimmy Hall... The over-all feel of the music is blues without pain."

== Track listing ==
- All tracks written by Mike Green unless indicated.
1. "Loser Two Times" – 4:34
2. "Momma Don'tcha Cry" – 3:26
3. "Born Under a Bad Sign" (Booker T. Jones, William Bell) – 3:01
4. "I Could Not Ask for More" – 5:02
5. "Baby When the Sun Goes Down" – 5:39
6. "Walkin' the Road" – 3:52
7. "One Woman Love" – 5:34
8. "Cryin' Won't Bring You Back" – 5:09
9. "Little Dreamer" (Peter Green, M. Green) – 7:01

== Personnel ==
=== Musicians ===
- Peter Green – lead guitar, vocals, harmonica
- Ronnie Johnson – rhythm guitar
- Roy Shipston – organ
- Paul Westwood – bass guitar (all tracks except 5, 7)
- John 'Rhino' Edwards – bass guitar (track 5)
- Kuma Harada – bass guitar (track 7)
- Dave Mattacks – drums
- Morris Pert – percussion (tracks 1, 2, 6–9)
- Peter Vernon-Kell – piano (track 4)
- Pam Douglas – backing vocals (tracks 1, 5)
- Carol Ingram – backing vocals (tracks 1, 5)

=== Production ===
- Peter Vernon-Kell – producer
- Mike Cooper – engineer, mixing
- Bob Searles, Bernard Chandler – design

== Chart performance ==
Chart performance for "Little Dreamer"
| Chart (1980) | Peak position |
|---|---|
| German Albums (Offizielle Top 100) | 15 |
| New Zealand Albums (RMNZ) | 39 |
| Norwegian Albums (VG-lista) | 7 |
| Swedish Albums (Sverigetopplistan) | 18 |
| UK Albums (Official Charts) | 34 |
| US Billboard 200 | 186 |
