= Terraplane Blues =

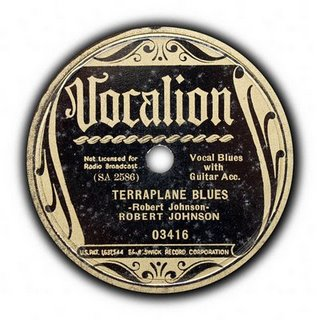
- Original 78 record label

Single by Robert Johnson
- Released: March 1937
- Recorded: November 23, 1936
- Studio: Gunter Hotel, San Antonio, Texas
- Genre: Blues
- Length: 3:01
- Label: Vocalion
- Songwriter(s): Robert Johnson
- Producer(s): Don Law

"Terraplane Blues" is a blues song recorded in 1936 in San Antonio, Texas, by bluesman Robert Johnson. Vocalion issued it as Johnson's first 78 rpm record, backed with "Kind Hearted Woman Blues", in March 1937. The song became a moderate regional hit, selling up to 10,000 copies.

Johnson used the car model Terraplane as a metaphor for sex. In the lyrical narrative, the car will not start and Johnson suspects that his girlfriend let another man drive it when he was gone. In describing the various mechanical problems with his Terraplane, Johnson creates a setting of thinly veiled sexual innuendo.
