= Reg Isidore =

- Birth name: Reg Isidore
- Born: 4 April 1949; Aruba
- Died: 22 March 2009 (aged 59)
- Genres: Rock, blues rock
- Occupation: Musician
- Instrument: Drums
- Years active: 1970–2009
- Formerly of: Robin Trower, Peter Green, Richard Wright, Jimmy Witherspoon Peter Bardens

Reg Isidore (4 April 1949 – 22 March 2009) was a rock drummer best known for his work with Robin Trower. Isidore was Trower's first drummer and he played on the Robin Trower Band's first two albums Twice Removed from Yesterday (1973) and Bridge of Sighs (1974). In his early career he played with Peter Bardens.

He regrouped with Trower and Jack Bruce in 1981 to record the album Truce. He also recorded albums with Richard Wright, Peter Green and Jimmy Witherspoon, among others.

Isidore died from a heart attack in the morning of 22 March 2009.
