= Whatcha Gonna Do? (Peter Green album) =

Studio album by Peter Green
- Released: March 1981
- Recorded: Autumn 1980
- Studios: Rock City Studios, Surrey, UK; Matrix Studios, London
- Genre: Blues rock
- Length: 41:38
- Label: PVK Records
- Producer: Peter Vernon-Kell

Peter Green chronology
Little Dreamer (1980)	Whatcha Gonna Do? (1981)	White Sky (1982)

Singles from Whatcha Gonna Do?
- 1. "Give Me Back My Freedom" Released: 3 April 1981 (Europe only); 2. "Promised Land" Released: 31 July 1981 (Europe only)

Professional ratings
Review scores
Source	Rating
AllMusic	2/5 stars

Whatcha Gonna Do? is an album by British blues rock musician Peter Green, who was the founder of Fleetwood Mac and a member from 1967–70. Released in 1981, this was his fourth solo album, the third in his 'middle period' of the late 1970s and early 1980s, and his last for PVK Records.

All the tracks on the album were written by Green's brother Mike.

== Track listing ==
- All tracks written by Mike Green.
1. "Gotta See Her Tonight" – 5:46
2. "Promised Land" – 3:29
3. "Bullet in the Sky" – 3:19
4. "Give Me Back My Freedom" – 5:37
5. "Last Train to San Antone" – 5:29
6. "To Break Your Heart" – 3:52
7. "Bizzy Lizzy" – 3:25
8. "Lost My Love" – 5:21
9. "Like a Hot Tomato" – 3:04
10. "Head Against the Wall" – 3:44

=== Bonus tracks on 2005 (CD) release ===
1. "Woman Don't" – 5:03
2. "Whatcha Gonna Do?" – 3:48

== Personnel ==
=== Musicians ===
- Peter Green – lead guitar, vocals
- Ronnie Johnson – rhythm guitar
- Roy Shipston – keyboards
- Paul Westwood – bass guitar
- Mo Foster – bass guitar
- Dave Mattacks – drums
- Lennox Langton – percussion
- Jeff Daly – saxophone

=== Technical ===
- Peter Vernon-Kell – producer
- Peter Vernon-Kell & Roy Shipston – arrangements
- Mike Cooper – engineer, mixing

== Charts ==
Chart performance for Whatcha Gonna Do?
Chart (1981)	Peak position
German Albums (Offizielle Top 100)	46
Norwegian Albums (VG-lista)	33
Swedish Albums (Sverigetopplistan)	34
