= In the Skies =

Studio album by Peter Green
- Released: May 1979
- Recorded: Autumn 1977
- Genres: Blues rock; soft rock
- Length: 40:18
- Label: PVK/EMI
- Producer: Peter Vernon-Kell

Peter Green chronology
The End of the Game (1970)	In the Skies (1979)	Little Dreamer (1980)

Singles from In the Skies
- 1. "In the Skies" Released: 20 July 1979 (Europe only)

Professional ratings
Review scores
Source	Rating
AllMusic	4/5 stars
Christgau's Record Guide	B+
Music Week	3/4 stars

In the Skies is an album by British blues rock musician Peter Green, who was the founder of Fleetwood Mac and a member from 1967 to 1970. Released in 1979, this was his second solo album and the first after eight years of obscurity.

Accompanying Green on this album were several experienced session musicians, including Snowy White, who had recently begun working with Pink Floyd and later joined Thin Lizzy. White contributed some of the lead guitar work on the album since Green was not yet fully comfortable with his return to recording after his long break. Also present was Green's colleague and friend from his earliest bands, Peter Bardens of Camel.

All tracks were written by Peter Green, with some of the lyrics written by Green's then-wife Jane.

Rehearsal versions of "In the Skies" and "Slabo Day" were released on Snowy White's Goldtop compilation album in 1996.

A single version of "Apostle" b/w "Tribal Dance" was released in June 1978, prior to the issue of the album. Record Business reviewed the single, saying that it was "lovingly performed" and not "technically taxing". Both tracks were re-recorded for the album.

== Track listing ==
1. "In the Skies" (Peter Green, Jane Green) – 3:52
2. "Slabo Day" (P. Green, Snowy White, Reg Isidore, Lennox Langton, Peter Bardens, Kuma Harada) – 5:12
3. "A Fool No More" (P. Green) – 7:46
4. "Tribal Dance" (P. Green, White, Isidore, Langton) – 4:29
5. "Seven Stars" (P. Green, J. Green) – 3:10
6. "Funky Chunk" (P. Green, White, Isidore, Langton, Bardens, Harada) – 4:16
7. "Just for You" (P. Green, J. Green, White, Isidore) – 4:39
8. "Proud Pinto" (P. Green) – 3:42
9. "Apostle" (P. Green) – 3:12
- Recorded at Lansdowne, Morgan, Vineyard, Ramport and Advision Studios, England

== 2022 CD reissue bonus tracks ==
1. "Apostle" (single version) – 3:55
2. "Tribal Dance" (single version) – 4:42
3. "Slabo Day" (rehearsal version) – 4:39
4. "In the Skies" (rehearsal version) – 4:12

== Personnel ==
=== Musicians ===
- Peter Green – vocals, lead guitar (tracks 1, 3–9), rhythm guitar (tracks 1, 2, 5, 8)
- Snowy White – rhythm guitar (tracks 3–4, 6–7, 9), lead guitar (tracks 1, 2)
- Peter Bardens – keyboards, Hammond organ, electric piano, (tracks 1–2)
- Kuma Harada – bass guitar, (tracks 1–8)
- Reg Isidore – drums, (tracks 1–7)
- Lennox Langton – percussion, congas, bongos, timbales, (tracks 1, 4, 7–8)
- Godfrey Maclean – drums, (track 8)

=== Technical ===
- Peter Vernon-Kell – producer
- Neil Hornby – mixing at Ramport
- Dave Crawford – mastering
- Susan Marsh – design
- Josiah Spaulding Jr., Peter Cormack – cover concept

== Chart performance ==
Chart performance for In the Skies
Chart (1979–1980)	Peak position
Austrian Albums (Ö3 Austria)	24
German Albums (Offizielle Top 100)	12
New Zealand Albums (RMNZ)	12
Norwegian Albums (VG-lista)	14
Swedish Albums (Sverigetopplistan)	11
UK Albums (Official Charts)	32
Chart (2020)	Peak position
UK Independent Albums (Official Charts)	37
