= Peter Green (musician) =

English musician (1946–2020)

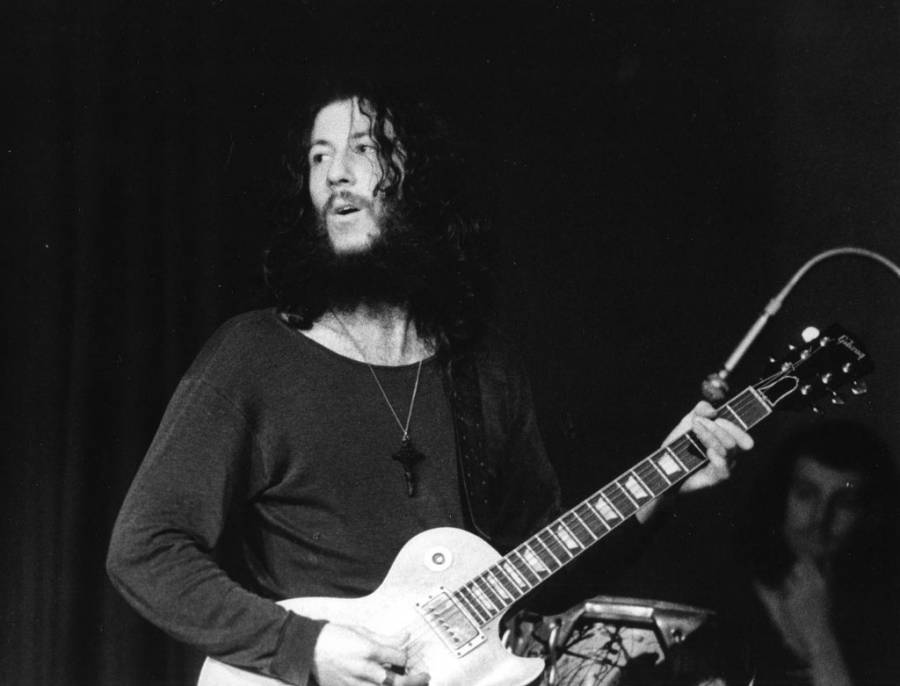
- Green in 1970

Background information
- Born: Peter Allen Greenbaum; 29 October 1946; Bethnal Green, London, England
- Died: 25 July 2020 (aged 73) Canvey Island, Essex, England
- Genres: Blues rock; blues; rock; jazz fusion; psychedelia
- Occupations: Singer-songwriter; musician
- Instruments: Guitar; vocals; harmonica
- Years active: 1961–2020
- Labels: Epic; Reprise; PVK; Creole
- Formerly of: John Mayall & the Bluesbreakers; Fleetwood Mac; Peter Green Splinter Group
- Spouse: Jane Samuels (m. 1978; div. 1979)

Peter Allen Greenbaum (29 October 1946 – 25 July 2020), known professionally as Peter Green, was an English blues rock singer-songwriter and guitarist who was the founder and original leader of the band Fleetwood Mac. Green formed the group in 1967 after a stint in John Mayall's Bluesbreakers and quickly established the new band as a popular live act in addition to a successful recording act, before departing in 1970. Green's songs, such as "Albatross", "Black Magic Woman", "Oh Well", "The Green Manalishi (With the Two Prong Crown)" and "Man of the World", appeared on singles charts and several have been adapted by a variety of musicians.

Green was a major figure in the "second great epoch" of the British blues movement. Eric Clapton praised his guitar playing and B. B. King commented, "He has the sweetest tone I ever heard; he was the only one who gave me the cold sweats." His trademark sound included string bending, vibrato, emotionally expressive tone and economy of style.

In June 1996, Green was voted the third-best guitarist of all time in Mojo magazine. In 2015, Rolling Stone ranked him at number 58 in its list of the "100 Greatest Guitarists of All Time". Green's tone on the instrumental "The Supernatural" was rated as one of the 50 greatest of all time by Guitar Player in 2004.

== Biography ==
=== 1946–1965: Early life and career ===
Peter Allen Greenbaum was born in Bethnal Green, London, on 29 October 1946, into a Jewish family, the youngest of Joe and Ann Greenbaum's four children. His brother, Michael, taught him his first guitar chords and by the age of 11, Green was teaching himself. He began playing professionally by the age of 15, while working for a number of east London shipping companies. He first played bass guitar in a band called Bobby Dennis and the Dominoes, which performed pop chart covers and rock 'n' roll standards, including Shadows covers. He later stated that Hank Marvin was his guitar hero and he played the Shadows' song "Midnight" on the 1996 tribute album Twang. He went on to join a rhythm and blues outfit, the Muskrats, then a band called the Tridents in which he played bass. By Christmas 1965, Green was playing lead guitar in Peter Bardens' band "Peter B's Looners", where he met drummer Mick Fleetwood. It was with Peter B's Looners that he made his recording début with the single "If You Wanna Be Happy" with "Jodrell Blues" as a B-side. His recording of "If You Wanna Be Happy" was an instrumental cover of a song by Jimmy Soul. In 1966, Green and some other members of Peter B's Looners formed another act, The Shotgun Express, a Motown-style soul band which also included Rod Stewart, but Green left the group after a few months.

=== 1966–1967: John Mayall and the Bluesbreakers ===
In October 1965, before joining Bardens' group, Green had the opportunity to fill in for Eric Clapton in John Mayall & the Bluesbreakers for four gigs. Soon afterwards, when Clapton left the Bluesbreakers, Green became a full-time member of Mayall's band from July 1966.

Mike Vernon, a producer at Decca Records recalls Green's début with the Bluesbreakers:

As the band walked in the studio I noticed an amplifier which I never saw before, so I said to John Mayall, "Where's Eric Clapton?" Mayall answered, "He's not with us anymore, he left us a few weeks ago." I was in a shock of state [sic] but Mayall said, "Don't worry, we got someone better." I said, "Wait a minute, hang on a second, this is ridiculous. You've got someone better? Than Eric Clapton?" John said, "He might not be better now, but you wait, in a couple of years he's going to be the best." Then he introduced me to Peter Green.

Green made his recording debut with the Bluesbreakers in 1966 on the album A Hard Road (1967), which featured two of his own compositions, "The Same Way" and "The Supernatural". The latter was one of Green's first instrumentals, which would soon become a trademark. So proficient was he that his musician friends bestowed upon him the nickname "The Green God," itself a reference to Eric Clapton's nickname "God". In 1967, Green decided to form his own blues band and left the Bluesbreakers. Green attributed this decision to his dissatisfaction with the musical direction of the Bluesbreakers, which he believed was veering away from blues music.

=== 1967–1970: Fleetwood Mac ===
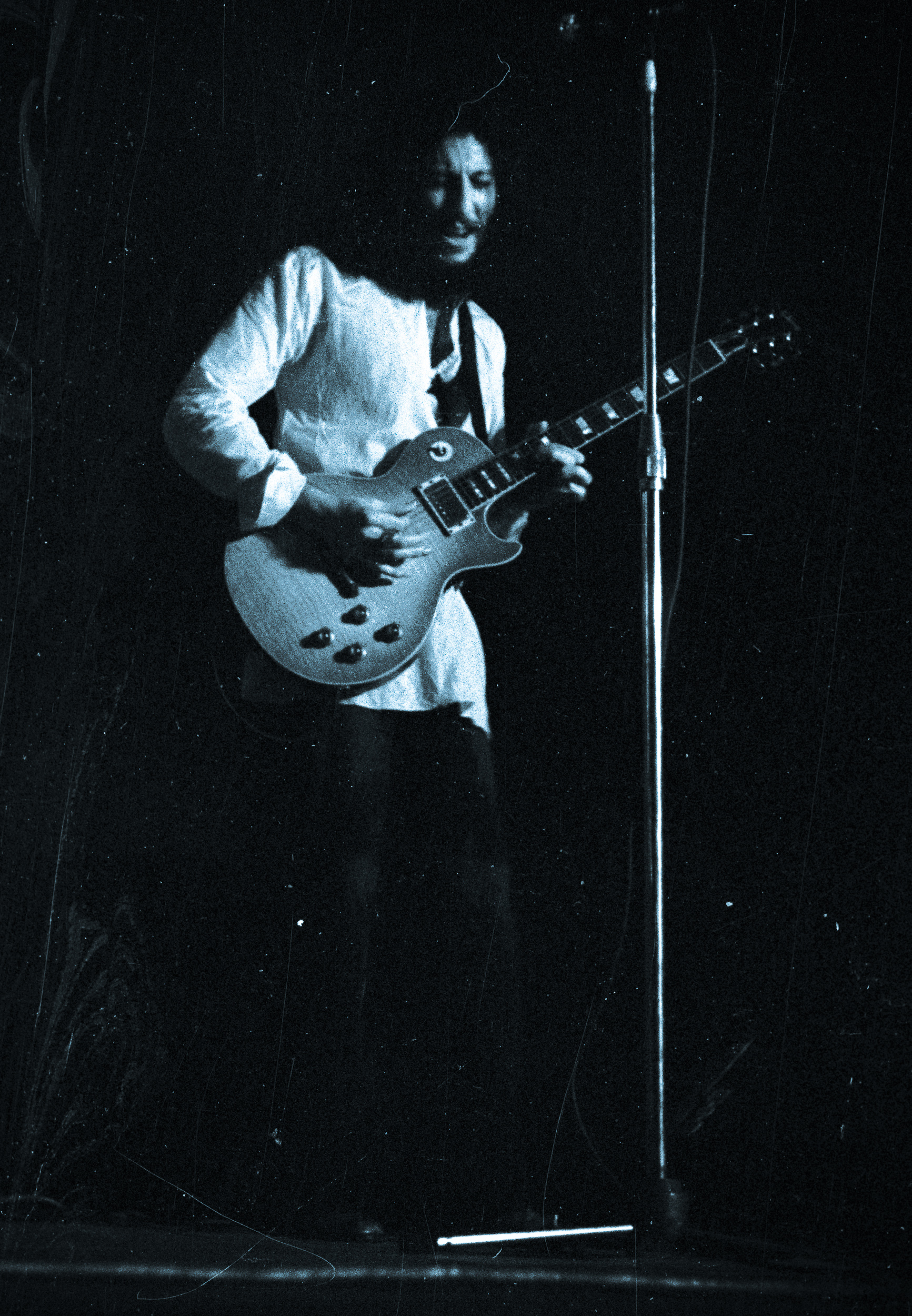
Green on 18 March 1970

Green's new band, with former Bluesbreaker Mick Fleetwood on drums and Jeremy Spencer on guitar, was initially called "Peter Green's Fleetwood Mac featuring Jeremy Spencer". Bob Brunning was temporarily employed on bass guitar (Green's first choice, Bluesbreakers' bassist John McVie, was not yet ready to join the band). Within a month they played at the Windsor National Jazz and Blues Festival in August 1967, and were quickly signed to Mike Vernon's Blue Horizon label. Their repertoire consisted mainly of blues covers and originals, mostly written by Green, but some were written by slide guitarist Jeremy Spencer. The band's first single, Spencer's "I Believe My Time Ain't Long" with Green's "Rambling Pony" as a B-side, did not chart but their eponymous debut album made a significant impression, remaining in the British charts for 37 weeks. By September 1967, John McVie had replaced Brunning.

Although classic blues covers and blues-styled originals remained prominent in the band's repertoire through this period, Green rapidly blossomed as a songwriter and contributed many successful original compositions from 1968 onwards. The songs chosen for single release showed Green's style gradually moving away from the group's blues roots into new musical territory. Their second studio album, Mr. Wonderful, was released in 1968 and continued the formula of the first album. In the same year they scored a hit with Green's "Black Magic Woman" (later covered by Santana), followed by the guitar instrumental "Albatross" (1969), which featured new band member 18-year-old Danny Kirwan and reached number one in the British singles charts. More hits written by Green followed, including "Oh Well", "Man of the World" (both 1969) and the ominous "The Green Manalishi" (1970). The double album Blues Jam in Chicago (1969) was recorded at the Chess Records Ter-Mar Studio in Chicago. There, under the joint supervision of Vernon and Marshall Chess, they recorded with some of their American blues heroes including Otis Spann, Big Walter Horton, Willie Dixon, J. T. Brown and Buddy Guy.

In 1969, after signing to Immediate Records for one single ("Man of the World", prior to that label's collapse) the group signed with Warner Bros. Records' Reprise Records label and recorded their third studio album, Then Play On, which prominently featured new third guitarist and songwriter Kirwan. Green had first seen Kirwan in 1967 playing with his blues trio Boilerhouse, with Trevor Stevens on bass and Dave Terrey on drums. Green was impressed with Kirwan's playing and used the band as a support act for Fleetwood Mac, before recruiting Kirwan to his own band in 1968 at the suggestion of Mick Fleetwood.

Beginning with the melancholy lyric of "Man of the World", Green's bandmates began to notice changes in his state of mind. He began taking large doses of LSD, grew a beard and began to wear robes and a crucifix. Mick Fleetwood recalls Green becoming concerned about accumulating wealth: "I had conversations with Peter Green around that time and he was obsessive about us not making money, wanting us to give it all away."

While touring Europe in late March 1970, Green took LSD at a party at a commune near Munich, an incident cited by Fleetwood Mac manager Clifford Davis as the crucial point in his mental decline. Communard Rainer Langhans mentions in his autobiography that he and Uschi Obermaier met Green in Munich and invited him to their Highfisch-Kommune. Fleetwood Mac roadie Dinky Dawson remembers that Green went to the party with another roadie, Dennis Keane, and that when Keane returned to the band's hotel to explain that Green would not leave the commune, Keane, Dawson and Mick Fleetwood travelled there to fetch him. By contrast, Green stated in 2009 that he had fond memories of jamming at the commune. "I had a good play there, it was great, someone recorded it, they gave me a tape. There were people playing along, a few of us just fooling around and it was... yeah it was great." He told Jeremy Spencer at the time "That's the most spiritual music I've ever recorded in my life." After a final performance on 20 May 1970, Green left Fleetwood Mac.

=== 1970–1973: After Fleetwood Mac ===
During the beginning of 1970, Green recorded two tracks for the album Juju by Gass, the line up of which included Bobby Tench, who left the band at this time for The Jeff Beck Group.

On 27 June 1970 Green appeared at the Bath Festival of Blues and Progressive Music with John Mayall, Rod Mayall (organ), Ric Grech (bass) and Aynsley Dunbar (drums). In that same year he recorded a jam session with drummer Godfrey Maclean, keyboardists Zoot Money and Nick Buck, and bassist Alex Dmochowski of The Aynsley Dunbar Retaliation; Reprise Records released the session as The End of the Game, Green's first post-Fleetwood Mac solo album. Also soon after leaving Fleetwood Mac, Green accompanied former bandmate keyboardist Peter Bardens (of Peter B's Looners) on Bardens' solo LP The Answer, playing lead guitar on several tracks. In 1971, he had a brief reunion with Fleetwood Mac, helping them to complete a U.S. tour after guitarist Jeremy Spencer had left the group, performing under the pseudonym Peter Blue. His first solo single, "Heavy Heart", was released in June 1971. That same month, he also performed the single on Top of the Pops with the co-writers of the song, which included Chris Kelly and Clifford Chewaluza on percussion and Nigel Watson on bass.

Green recorded a solo single with Watson and was credited on the album B.B. King in London in 1971. An uncredited appearance on Fleetwood Mac's Penguin LP in 1973, on the song "Night Watch" followed. At this time, Green's mental illness and drug use had become entrenched and he faded into professional obscurity.

=== 1974–1996: Illness and first re-emergence ===
Green was eventually diagnosed with schizophrenia and spent time in psychiatric hospitals undergoing electroconvulsive therapy during the mid-1970s. Many sources attest to his lethargic, trancelike state during this period. In 1977, Green was arrested for threatening his accountant David Simmons with a shotgun. The exact circumstances are the subject of much speculation, the most famous being that Green wanted Simmons to stop sending money to him. In the 2011 BBC documentary Peter Green: Man of the World, Green stated that at the time he had just returned from Canada needing money and that, during a telephone conversation with his accounts manager, he alluded to the fact that he had brought back a gun from his travels. His accounts manager promptly called the police, who surrounded Green's house.

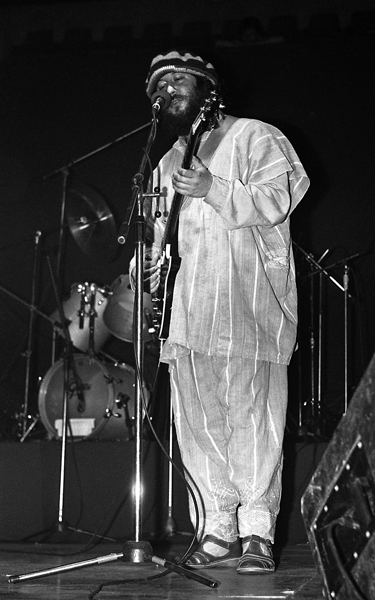
Green performing at Hala Pionir in Belgrade on 30 May 1983.

In 1979, Green began to re-emerge professionally. With the help of his brother Michael, he was signed to Peter Vernon-Kell's PVK label, and produced a string of solo albums starting with 1979's In the Skies. He also made an uncredited appearance on Fleetwood Mac's double album Tusk, on the song "Brown Eyes", released the same year.

Green had a single "Baby When the Sun Goes Down" bw "I Could Not Ask for More" released in Australia on the 7 Records label in 1980. It was produced by Peter Vernon-Kel.

In 1981, Green contributed to "Rattlesnake Shake" and "Super Brains" on Mick Fleetwood's solo album The Visitor. He recorded various sessions with a number of other musicians notably the Katmandu album A Case for the Blues with Ray Dorset of Mungo Jerry, Vincent Crane from The Crazy World of Arthur Brown and Len Surtees of The Nashville Teens. Despite attempts by Gibson Guitar Corporation to start talks about producing a "Peter Green signature Les Paul" guitar, Green's instrument of choice at this time was a Gibson Howard Roberts Fusion guitar. In 1986, Peter and his brother Micky contributed to the album A Touch of Sunburn by Lawrie 'The Raven' Gaines (under the group name 'The Enemy Within'). This album has been reissued many times under such titles as Post Modern Blues and Peter Green and Mick Green – Two Greens Make a Blues, often crediting Pirates guitarist Mick Green.

In 1988 Green was quoted as saying: "I'm at present recuperating from treatment for taking drugs. It was drugs that influenced me a lot. I took more than I intended to. I took LSD eight or nine times. The effect of that stuff lasts so long ... I wanted to give away all my money ... I went kind of holy – no, not holy, religious. I thought I could do it, I thought I was all right on drugs. My failing!"

=== 1997–2020: Peter Green Splinter Group and later life ===
Green formed the Peter Green Splinter Group in the late 1990s, with the assistance of Nigel Watson and Cozy Powell. The group released nine blues albums, mostly written by Watson, between 1997 and 2004. Early in 2004, a tour was cancelled and the recording of a new studio album stopped when Green left the band and moved to Sweden. Shortly thereafter he signed on to a tour with the British Blues All Stars scheduled for the following year. In February 2009, Green began playing and touring again, this time as Peter Green and Friends.

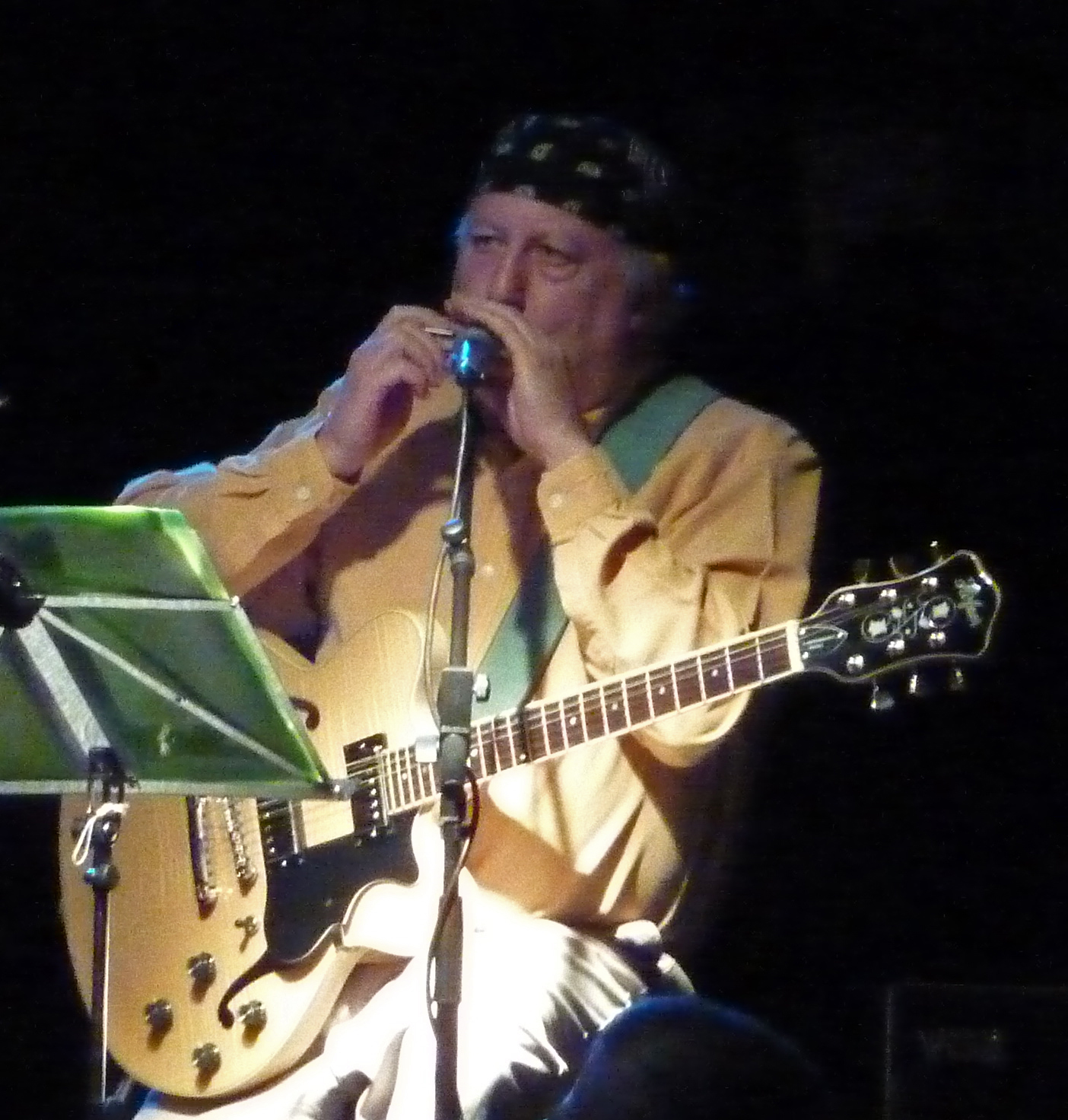
Green performing at the Robin 2 in Bilston

Along with the other members of Fleetwood Mac, Green was inducted into the Rock and Roll Hall of Fame in 1998. In the early 2000s there were rumours of a reunion of the early line-up of Fleetwood Mac, involving Green and Jeremy Spencer. The two guitarists and vocalists were apparently unconvinced of the merits of such a project, but in April 2006, during a question-and-answer session on the Penguin Fleetwood Mac fan website, bassist John McVie said of the reunion idea:

If we could get Peter and Jeremy to do it, I'd probably, maybe, do it. I know Mick would do it in a flash. Unfortunately, I don't think there's much chance of Danny doing it. Bless his heart.

In May 2009, Green was the subject of the BBC Four documentary Peter Green: Man of the World produced by Henry Hadaway. On 25 February 2020 an all-star tribute concert was performed at the London Palladium, billed as "Mick Fleetwood and Friends Tribute to Peter Green". Fleetwood said the following year that Green was aware of the concert but did not attend. An album from this performance was released under the title Celebrate the Music of Peter Green and the Early Years of Fleetwood Mac.

== Musical style ==
Robin Denselow in The Guardian described Green as being "interested in expressing emotion in his songs, rather than showing off how fast he could play". He has been praised for his swinging shuffle grooves and soulful phrases and favoured the minor mode and its darker blues implications. His distinct tone can be heard on "The Supernatural", an instrumental written by Green for John Mayall and the Bluesbreakers' 1967 album A Hard Road. This song demonstrates Green's control of harmonic feedback. The sound is characterised by a shivering vibrato, clean cutting tones, and a series of ten-second sustained notes. These tones were achieved by Green controlling feedback on a Les Paul guitar.

== Equipment ==
Early in his career, Green played a Harmony Meteor, an inexpensive hollow-body guitar. He began playing a Gibson Les Paul with the Peter B's, a guitar which was often referred to as his "magic guitar" (nicknamed "Greeny"). Though he played other guitars, he is best known for deriving a unique tone from his 1959 Les Paul. Green later sold it to Northern Irish guitarist Gary Moore for all the money Moore could get by selling his Gibson SG guitar. Green had bought the guitar after his first spell with Mayall but before joining the Peter B's, for £114 from Selmers in Charing Cross Road. In 2014, Kirk Hammett of Metallica bought the guitar. Hammett has stated that he paid quite a bit less than $1m for it, being in the right place when the guy who was selling it needed some cash.

In the 1990s, Green played a 1960s Fender Stratocaster and a Gibson Howard Roberts Fusion model, using Fender Blues DeVille and Vox AC30 amplifiers. Towards the very end of his playing days, the Gibson ES-165 saw more use.

By the time of his death, Green had accumulated more than 150 electric and acoustic guitars and other instruments. They were sold at auction by Bonhams of London in June 2023. The sale also included amps and equipment, programmes, records, letters, sketchbooks, and handwritten lyrics. A 1968 Gretsch White Falcon semi-acoustic and a 1931 National Duolian Resonator each sold for £38,400, and a 1999 Fender Strat USA Custom Shop relic guitar fetched £23,040. Green's handwritten lyrics of Man of the World were expected to fetch between £40,000 and £60,000. Some of the instruments were exhibited at the Guitar Show in Birmingham in February 2023.

== Influence and legacy ==
Many rock guitarists have cited Green as an influence, including Gary Moore, Joe Perry of Aerosmith, Andy Powell of Wishbone Ash, Mark Knopfler, Noel Gallagher and Radiohead bassist Colin Greenwood. Green was the Black Crowes' Rich Robinson's pick in Guitar World's "30 on 30: The Greatest Guitarists Picked by the Greatest Guitarists" (2010). In the same article Robinson cites Jimmy Page, with whom the Crowes toured: "he told us so many Peter Green stories. It was clear that Jimmy loves the man's talent". His songs have been recorded by artists like Santana, Aerosmith, Status Quo, The Black Crowes, Midge Ure, Tom Petty, Judas Priest, and Gary Moore, who recorded Blues for Greeny, an album of Green compositions. In 1995, the tribute album Rattlesnake Guitar: The Music of Peter Green was released, and subsequently was reissued in 2000 as Peter Green Songbook.

== Personal life ==
Green married Jane Samuels in January 1978; the couple divorced in 1979. They had a daughter.

Enduring periods of mental illness and destitution throughout the 1970s and 1980s, Green moved in with his older brother Len and Len's wife Gloria, and his mother in their house in Gorleston near Great Yarmouth, where a process of recovery began.

He lived for a period on Canvey Island, Essex, where he died in his sleep on 25 July 2020 at the age of 73.

== Discography ==
=== Solo ===
- The End of the Game (1970)
- In the Skies (1979)
- Little Dreamer (1980)
- Whatcha Gonna Do? (1981)
- White Sky (1982)
- Kolors (1983)

=== With Fleetwood Mac ===
- Fleetwood Mac (1968)
- Mr. Wonderful (1968)
- Then Play On (1969)
- Fleetwood Mac in Chicago (1969)
- Penguin (1973) – on "Night Watch"
- Tusk (1979) – on "Brown Eyes"

=== With John Mayall & the Bluesbreakers ===
- A Hard Road (1967)

=== With the Peter Green Splinter Group ===
- Peter Green Splinter Group (1997)
- The Robert Johnson Songbook (1998)
- Destiny Road (1999)
- Hot Foot Powder (2000)
- Time Traders (2001)
- Blues Don't Change (2001)
- Reaching the Cold 100 (2003)

=== With Katmandu ===
- A Case for the Blues (1985)

=== With the Enemy Within ===
- A Touch of Sunburn (1985)
