= Roger Cotton =

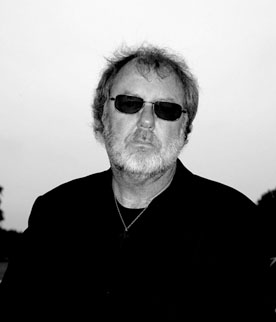
Roger Cotton

Roger Allen Cotton (1946 – 1 June 2016) was an English musician, singer, songwriter, producer and engineer. He played keyboards and guitar. Cotton first played in his father's band at the age of 13. He was a member of the Peter Green Splinter Group, The Clockwork Orange, The Bandwagon, and The Brothers Grim where he met longtime collaborator Alan Glen. At the time of his death, Cotton was the keyboard player in the Buddy Whittington Band.

== Biography ==
Cotton was born in Bromley, London, England.

Cotton, when a member of Peter Green Splinter Group, wrote some of the band's songs, including "Big Change" and "Real World". He played keyboard and guitar with John Mayall & The Bluesbreakers, Paul Jones, Carlos Santana, Papa George Blues Band, Soul Survivor, The Paul Cox Band, and with Buddy Whittington. He has also written and recorded with Eric Bibb, Dr. Feelgood, The Barcodes, Incredible Blues Puppies, Downliners Sect, Sonny Black and Derek Nash. He also made various appearances on television in the United States, Europe and Japan.

He was the owner of Roundel Studios in Horton Kirby, Kent, where many musicians have recorded. The studio closed after his death.

In November 2008, after producing and engineering hundreds of albums for other musicians, Cotton released his first album, A Long Way Back, under his own name, featuring many of the musicians he had worked with including Derek Nash, Marcus Malone, Gary Barnacle, Papa George, Buddy Whittington, Paul Cox and Val Cowell. This is now available to stream on Spotify.

He died in Kent, England in June 2016, from a pulmonary embolism. His funeral took place on 28 June at Eltham Crematorium, Crown Wood Way, London.
