= Behind the Mask Tour =

1990 concert tour by Fleetwood Mac

- Tour by Fleetwood Mac
- Poster to the concert in Frankfurt
- Associated album: Behind the Mask
- Start date: March 23, 1990
- End date: December 7, 1990
- Legs: 4
- No. of shows: 101

Fleetwood Mac concert chronology
- Shake the Cage Tour (1987–88); Behind the Mask Tour (1990); Another Link in the Chain Tour (1994–95)

The Behind the Mask Tour was a worldwide concert tour by the British-American rock band Fleetwood Mac. The tour began on March 23, 1990, in Brisbane, Australia, and ended on December 7, 1990, in Inglewood, California.

== History ==
This would be the last tour for Rick Vito with the band; and for Christine McVie and Stevie Nicks for seven years. Nicks and Vito would leave the group in 1991, though Nicks appeared with the band again briefly in 1993 before resuming with them again in 1997. Meanwhile, McVie retired from touring in 1990, but resumed in 1997 before leaving the group permanently in 1998. McVie would later rejoin in 2014.

The November 2 show in Philadelphia was originally scheduled for July 20, but it was postponed because Christine McVie's father had died. Before the Boston show, the band showed up at Boston's Hard Rock Cafe, signing autographs and donated a guitar to their memorabilia collection. The band played 101 shows in 13 countries around the world.

On the December 6 and 7 concerts in Oakland and Inglewood, Lindsey Buckingham made a guest appearance to play "Landslide" with Nicks during the set, then made another appearance during the set closer "Go Your Own Way" and the first encore number, "Tear It Up", where he engaged in guitar duels with Rick Vito and Billy Burnette.

The Japanese leg of the tour was documented through a television special which was filmed primarily at the Tokyo concerts.

During the tour, a video for the single "Skies the Limit" was filmed. It was shot at the June 13 show in Morrison, Colorado.

The opening acts for the tour were Squeeze, Jethro Tull and Daryl Hall & John Oates.

== Set list ==
1. "In the Back of My Mind"
2. "The Chain"
3. "Dreams"
4. "Isn't It Midnight"
5. "Oh Well"
6. "Rhiannon"
7. "Stop Messin' Round"
8. "Save Me"
9. "Gold Dust Woman"
10. "I Loved Another Woman"
11. "Landslide"
12. "World Turning"
13. "Everywhere"
14. "Stand on the Rock"
15. "Little Lies"
16. "Stand Back" (Stevie Nicks song)
17. "You Make Loving Fun"
18. "Go Your Own Way"
  Encore
19. "Tear it Up" (Johnny Burnette cover)
20. "Don't Stop"
21. "Songbird"

== Tour dates ==
Date	City	Country	Venue
March 23, 1990	Brisbane	Australia	Brisbane Entertainment Centre
March 26, 1990	Melbourne	Australia	National Tennis Centre
March 28, 1990	Melbourne	Australia	National Tennis Centre
March 29, 1990	Melbourne	Australia	National Tennis Centre
March 31, 1990	Melbourne	Australia	National Tennis Centre
April 1, 1990	Melbourne	Australia	National Tennis Centre
April 4, 1990	Adelaide	Australia	Memorial Drive Park
April 8, 1990	Perth	Australia	Perth Entertainment Centre
April 9, 1990	Perth	Australia	Perth Entertainment Centre
April 12, 1990	Sydney	Australia	Sydney Entertainment Centre
April 15, 1990	Sydney	Australia	Sydney Entertainment Centre
April 17, 1990	Sydney	Australia	Sydney Entertainment Centre
April 18, 1990	Sydney	Australia	Sydney Entertainment Centre
April 23, 1990	Tokyo	Japan	Kousei Nenkin Kaikan
April 24, 1990	Tokyo	Japan	Kousei Nenkin Kaikan
May 25, 1990	Vancouver	Canada	Pacific Coliseum
May 26, 1990	George	United States	Champs de Brionne Music Theater
May 27, 1990	George	United States	Champs de Brionne Music Theater
May 30, 1990	Portland	United States	Portland Memorial Coliseum
June 1, 1990	Sacramento	United States	Cal Expo Amphitheatre
June 2, 1990	Mountain View	United States	Shoreline Amphitheatre
June 3, 1990	Concord	United States	Concord Pavilion
June 6, 1990	Phoenix	United States	Compton Terrace Amphitheatre
June 8, 1990	Irvine	United States	Irvine Meadows Amphitheatre
June 9, 1990	San Diego	United States	SDSU Open Air Theatre
June 10, 1990	Las Vegas	United States	Aladdin Theatre
June 13, 1990	Morrison	United States	Red Rocks Amphitheatre
June 14, 1990	Morrison	United States	Red Rocks Amphitheatre
June 16, 1990	Bonner Springs	United States	Sandstone Amphitheater
June 17, 1990	St. Louis	United States	St. Louis Arena
June 19, 1990	Dallas	United States	Reunion Arena
June 20, 1990	Houston	United States	The Summit
June 23, 1990	Atlanta	United States	Lakewood Amphitheatre
June 26, 1990	Grove City	United States	Capital Music Center
June 27, 1990	Tinley Park	United States	World Music Theatre
June 29, 1990 (Note: Part of Summerfest.)	Milwaukee	United States	Marcus Amphitheater
June 30, 1990	Bloomington	United States	Met Center
July 3, 1990	Richfield	United States	Richfield Coliseum
July 5, 1990	Auburn Hills	United States	The Palace of Auburn Hills
July 6, 1990	Noblesville	United States	Deer Creek Music Center
July 9, 1990	Holmdel Township	United States	Garden State Arts Center
July 12, 1990	Hartford	United States	Hartford Civic Center
July 14, 1990	Old Orchard Beach	United States	Seashore Performing Arts Center
July 15, 1990	Saratoga Springs	United States	Saratoga Performing Arts Center
July 17, 1990	Burgettstown	United States	Star Lake Amphitheater
July 18, 1990	Landover	United States	Capital Centre
July 20, 1990	Philadelphia	United States	The Spectrum
July 23, 1990	East Rutherford	United States	Meadowlands Arena
July 24, 1990	East Rutherford	United States	Meadowlands Arena
July 26, 1990	Mansfield	United States	Great Woods Amphitheater
July 27, 1990	Mansfield	United States	Great Woods Amphitheater
July 28, 1990	Mansfield	United States	Great Woods Amphitheater
July 31, 1990	Wantagh	United States	Jones Beach Marine Theater
August 1, 1990	Wantagh	United States	Jones Beach Marine Theater
August 2, 1990	Wantagh	United States	Jones Beach Marine Theater
August 21, 1990	Ghent	Belgium	Flanders Expo
August 23, 1990	Utrecht	Netherlands	Galgenwaard Stadion
August 25, 1990	Manchester	England	Maine Road
August 29, 1990	Dublin	Ireland	The Point Depot
August 30, 1990	Ghent	Belgium	Flanders Expo
September 1, 1990	London	England	Wembley Stadium
September 5, 1990	Stockholm	Sweden	Globe Annexet
September 7, 1990	Essen	West Germany	Grugahalle
September 8, 1990	Hamburg	West Germany	Alsterdorfer Sporthalle
September 9, 1990	Frankfurt	West Germany	Festhalle Frankfurt
September 12, 1990	Munich	West Germany	Olympiahalle
September 13, 1990	Vienna	Austria	Wiener Stadthalle
September 15, 1990	Locarno	Switzerland	Piazza Grande
September 16, 1990	Modena	Italy	Festa de'l Unità
September 18, 1990	Milan	Italy	Palatrussardi
September 19, 1990	Rome	Italy	Palazzetto dello Sport
October 17, 1990	Gainesville	United States	Stephen C. O'Connell Center
October 19, 1990	Chapel Hill	United States	Dean Smith Center
October 21, 1990	Charlotte	United States	Charlotte Coliseum
October 24, 1990	Miami	United States	Miami Arena
October 25, 1990	Tampa	United States	USF Sun Dome
October 27, 1990	Knoxville	United States	Thompson-Boling Arena
October 28, 1990	Auburn Hills	United States	The Palace of Auburn Hills
October 30, 1990	Toronto	Canada	SkyDome
November 1, 1990	New York City	United States	Madison Square Garden
November 2, 1990	Philadelphia	United States	The Spectrum
November 3, 1990	West Point	United States	Eisenhower Hall
November 6, 1990	Bethlehem	United States	Stabler Arena
November 7, 1990	Landover	United States	Capital Centre
November 9, 1990	Hartford	United States	Hartford Civic Center
November 11, 1990	Portland	United States	Cumberland County Civic Center
November 13, 1990	Boston	United States	Boston Garden
November 14, 1990	Providence	United States	Providence Civic Center
November 16, 1990	Atlantic City	United States	Etess Arena
November 17, 1990	Albany	United States	Knickerbocker Arena
November 19, 1990	Pittsburgh	United States	Civic Arena
November 20, 1990	Richfield	United States	Richfield Coliseum
November 23, 1990	Cincinnati	United States	Riverfront Coliseum
November 24, 1990	Indianapolis	United States	Market Square Arena
November 27, 1990	Winnipeg	Canada	Winnipeg Arena
November 29, 1990	Saskatoon	Canada	Saskatchewan Place
November 30, 1990	Calgary	Canada	Olympic Saddledome
December 2, 1990	Edmonton	Canada	Northlands Coliseum
December 4, 1990	Seattle	United States	Seattle Center Coliseum
December 6, 1990	Oakland	United States	Oakland-Alameda County Coliseum
December 7, 1990	Inglewood	United States	The Forum

== Personnel ==
- Mick Fleetwood – drums, percussion
- John McVie – bass guitar
- Christine McVie – Hammond organ, Yamaha DX7, piano, maracas, vocals
- Rick Vito – lead guitar, vocals
- Billy Burnette – rhythm guitar, vocals
- Stevie Nicks – vocals, tambourine

Additional musicians

- Dan Garfield – keyboards
- Isaac Asanté – percussion
- Lynn Mabry – backing vocals
- Liza Jane Likins – backing vocals
- Sharon Celani – backing vocals
