= Love Is Dangerous =

Promotional single by Fleetwood Mac

from the album Behind the Mask
- Released: 1990
- Recorded: 1989–90
- Genre: Pop rock
- Length: 3:18
- Label: Warner Bros.
- Songwriters: Rick Vito, Stevie Nicks
- Producers: Greg Ladanyi, Fleetwood Mac

"Love Is Dangerous" is a song released in 1990 by British-American band Fleetwood Mac from their album Behind the Mask. It was one of the album's two songs co-written by Stevie Nicks and Rick Vito. The song was also issued as a promotional single, which charted in North America.

== Background ==
Vito conceived "Love Is Dangerous" as a duet with Nicks and planned to have her cover the higher harmonies. Whereas some of Vito's other demos were rejected for the Behind the Mask album, the band demonstrated more interest in "Love Is Dangerous" and agreed to develop it. He commented that "if Stevie didn't like the song I presented to her, she was never obligated to go any further. There were a couple things that I played for her that she liked and thought she could something with. And she did." Musically, "Love Is Dangerous" is a blues-rock composition with instrumentation of electric guitars, bass, keyboards, and drums. Some of Vito's guitar parts were played with a bottleneck slide.

When determining which song from Behind the Mask to release as a single, the band consulted with their label to make the decision. Vito was the only member of the band who suggested "Love is Dangerous"; the remaining members were in favour of "Save Me", which was ultimately lifted as the album's lead single. "Love Is Dangerous" released as a promotional single and serviced to album oriented rock stations in April 1990. During the week of 13 April 1990, Radio & Records reported that it received 31 reports from album oriented rock stations. By 18 May 1990, 69% of album oriented rock stations reporting to Radio & Records had included "Love is Dangerous" in their playlists. The song reached number 7 on the Billboard Mainstream Rock chart and number 70 in Canada. Vito recorded a solo version of the song for his album Crazy Cool in 2001, who reworked the song by modulating it to a major key, truncating the lyrics in the first verse, and removing the bridge.

== Critical reception ==
Writing for the Los Angeles Times, Steve Hochman thought that the song "injected the band's original blues foundation". Rolling Stone characterized the song as a "funky romp that keeps the imagery to a bare minimum."

== Credits ==
Fleetwood Mac

- Stevie Nicks – lead vocals
- Rick Vito – lead guitar, lead vocals
- Billy Burnette – rhythm guitar, backing vocals
- Christine McVie – keyboards, synthesizer, backing vocals
- John McVie – bass guitar
- Mick Fleetwood – drums, percussion

Additional personnel

- Steve Croes – additional keyboards

== Charts ==
Chart (1990)	Peak position
US Billboard Mainstream Rock	7
Canadian Singles Chart	70
