= Skies the Limit =

1990 single by Fleetwood Mac

Single by Fleetwood Mac

from the album Behind the Mask
- B-side: "The Second Time"; "Lizard People"
- Released: July 1990
- Genre: Rock
- Length: 3:44
- Label: Warner Bros.
- Songwriters: Christine McVie; Eddy Quintela
- Producers: Greg Ladanyi; Fleetwood Mac

Fleetwood Mac singles chronology
"Save Me" (1990)	"Skies the Limit" (1990)	"In the Back of My Mind" (1990)

"Skies the Limit" is a song by British-American band Fleetwood Mac from their album Behind the Mask. It was written by Christine McVie and Eddy Quintela. In the United States, the song was released as the album's second single in July 1990. Four months later, the song was issued as the album's third single in the United Kingdom.

The single did not chart on the US Billboard Hot 100 and instead number 10 on the Billboard Adult Contemporary chart and number 40 on the Album Rock Tracks chart. The moderate success of "Skies the Limit" and "Save Me" helped to push their parent album into the US and Canadian top 20, albeit only briefly.

"Skies the Limit" was the only track from Behind the Mask included on The Very Best of Fleetwood Mac 2-CD set in 2002.

== Background ==
McVie wrote "Skies the Limit" as an upbeat song with the intention of offsetting some Behind the Mask tracks that she thought sounded too depressing. "Everything was getting to the point of where it was a downer album. It sounded like this was a potential suicide band, which it wasn't. I decided to write a song that was really up, it was a rally song." The song's intro consists of percussion, keyboards, a swell of guitars that lead into an accented snare drum hit. The remainder of the song follows the conventions of a midtempo rock composition and also features extensive vocal harmonies.

When deliberating which song from Behind the Mask to release as the first single, the band consulted with their record label for input. Whereas most of the members wanted "Save Me" to be released as the first single from the album, the record label suggested "Skies the Limit" instead. Ultimately, "Save Me" was lifted as the album's lead single, which was followed by "Skies the Limit". During the week of 6 July 1990, "Skies the Limit" was the most added song to US adult contemporary radio stations reporting to Radio & Records. The song also received airplay in Germany, where it was the 17th most played song in the country for the week of 11 August 1990 according to information compiled by Media Control.

A music video for "Skies the Limit" was filmed at the Red Rocks Amphitheatre in Colorado following a series of performances in Japan and Australia. During the production process of the music video, Mick Fleetwood expressed his hope that the music video would be more "personal" than their music video for "Save Me", which he dismissed as "stupidly artsy-craftsy". He said that his goal for the "Skies the Limit" music video was to "keep it somewhat live but with some insights into the band and the personalities."

GQ labeled "Skies the Limit" as one of the ten best post-Rumours songs, saying that "the misspelled opening from the album" is "a belter, the only truly memorable song from the album".

== Track listings ==
US 7-inch vinyl and cassette single (7-19867, 9 19867-4)

A. "Skies the Limit" – 3:42
B. "The Second Time" – 2:30

German 7-inch single (5439-19740-7)

A. "Skies the Limit" – 3:45
B. "Lizard People" – 4:48

German maxi-CD single (7599-21709-2)

1. "Skies the Limit" (LP) – 3:45
2. "Little Lies" (live) – 4:14
3. "The Chain" (live) – 5:12

== Personnel ==
Fleetwood Mac

- Christine McVie – keyboards, synthesizer, lead vocals
- Stevie Nicks – backing vocals
- Billy Burnette – rhythm guitar, backing vocals
- Rick Vito – lead guitar, backing vocals
- John McVie – bass guitar
- Mick Fleetwood – drums, tambourine, congas, wind chimes

Additional personnel

- Steve Croes – additional keyboards

== Charts ==
=== Weekly charts ===
Chart (1990)	Peak position
Australia (ARIA)	155
Canada Top Singles (RPM)	26
Canada Adult Contemporary (RPM)	8
Netherlands (Dutch Top 40 Tipparade)	4
Netherlands (Single Top 100)	48
US Adult Contemporary (Billboard)	10
US Mainstream Rock (Billboard)	40
US Adult Contemporary (Gavin Report)	4
US Adult Contemporary (Radio & Records)	5
US AOR Tracks (Radio & Records)	38

=== Year-end charts ===
Chart (1990)	Position
Canada Adult Contemporary (RPM)	75
US Adult Contemporary (Gavin Report)	27
US Adult Contemporary (Radio & Records)	42

== Release history ==
Region	Date	Format(s)	Label(s)	Ref.
United States	July 1990	—N/a	Warner Bros.	
Japan	25 July 1990	Mini-CD	Warner Bros.	
Australia	6 August 1990	7-inch vinyl; CD; cassette	Warner Bros.	
United Kingdom	26 November 1990	7-inch vinyl; 12-inch vinyl; CD; cassette	Warner Bros.	
