= In the Back of My Mind (Fleetwood Mac song) =

1990 single by Fleetwood Mac

Single by Fleetwood Mac

from the album Behind the Mask
- B-side: "Lizard People"
- Released: 13 August 1990
- Genre: Rock
- Length: 7:02 (album version); 4:58 (7-inch edit)
- Label: Warner Bros.
- Songwriters: Billy Burnette, David Malloy
- Producers: Greg Ladanyi, Fleetwood Mac

Fleetwood Mac singles chronology
"Skies the Limit" (1990)	"In the Back of My Mind" (1990)	"Hard Feelings" (1990)

"In the Back of My Mind" is a song by British-American band Fleetwood Mac from their 15th studio album, Behind the Mask (1990). The song was released as the album's second single for select European markets but only had a minor impact in the United Kingdom, peaking at No. 58. It was not made commercially available in North America, where "Hard Feelings" was released as a single instead. Both singles were co-written by Billy Burnette, who was one of the guitarists enlisted to replace Lindsey Buckingham in 1987. On the Behind the Mask Tour, "In the Back of My Mind" was played as the opening song of the set.

== Background ==
"In the Back of My Mind" was written with David Malloy, a songwriter and producer stationed in Nashville. Burnette presented the song to Mick Fleetwood, who agreed that it would be a good fit for Behind the Mask. During the song's intro, the band utilized a device created by Jimmy Hotz called the Hotz Midi Translator, a device with touch sensitive pads that can be attached to the body.

In a Q&A with The Penguin, Burnette noted that the band combined three 48-track machines to fit all of their overdubs on "In the Back of My Mind". At the time, that feat almost landed the band in the Guinness Book of World Records for the most individual tracks used on one song. Christine McVie, who provided additional vocals on "In the Back of My Mind", commented on the song in an interview with Mix magazine.

That song is very reminiscent of the old 'Manalishi' days. I don't mean the song 'Green Manalishi,' but rather, that era when Peter Green was starting to change and write all those kind of things. We've got four or five very heavy guitars in it. It isn't typical of all the songs on the album, but it is very typical of the variety that will be offered."

The B-side of "In the Back of My Mind", "Lizard People", was written by Mick Fleetwood and Peter Bardens, a former bandmate of Fleetwood. "Lizard People" is one of the few Fleetwood Mac songs to feature Fleetwood on lead vocals.

== Critical reception ==
Billboard highlighted "In the Back of My Mind" for its "ominous, Pink Floydian intro and agile guitar work" in their review for Behind the Mask. David Giles from Music Week wrote that the song was "not their most inspired moment, but should have little problem in scoring a minor hit." Bruce C. Pilato of Mix magazine characterised "In the Back of My Mind" as a song that was "built on a pulsating rhythm and driven by a powerful wall of electric guitars."

== Track listings ==
7-inch single

1. "In the Back of My Mind" (edit)
2. "Lizard People"

12-inch single

1. "In the Back of My Mind" (LP version)
2. "Little Lies" (live)
3. "The Chain" (live)

== Credits ==
Fleetwood Mac

- Christine McVie – keyboards, lead and backing vocals
- Stevie Nicks – backing vocals
- Billy Burnette – rhythm guitar, lead vocals
- Rick Vito – lead guitar, backing vocals
- John McVie – bass guitar
- Mick Fleetwood – drums, percussion, spoken word

Additional personnel

- Stephen Croes – Synclavier, synthesizers

== Charts ==
Chart (1990)	Peak position
UK Singles (OCC)	58
