= Another Link in the Chain Tour =

1994–95 concert tour by Fleetwood Mac

Another Link In The Chain
- Tour by Fleetwood Mac
- Associated album: Time
- Start date: July 4, 1994
- End date: December 31, 1995
- Legs: 4
- No. of shows: 110

Fleetwood Mac concert chronology
- Behind the Mask Tour (1990); Another Link In The Chain Tour (1994–95); The Dance Tour (1997)

Another Link in the Chain Tour was a worldwide concert tour by the British-American rock band Fleetwood Mac. The tour began on July 4, 1994, in Austin, Texas, and ended on December 31, 1995, in Las Vegas. The band played 110 shows in five countries around the world.

It was the first tour since 1970 not to feature vocalist/keyboardist Christine McVie, who retired from live performances but did participate on the tour's associated album, Time. Additionally, it was the only tour since the 1974 Heroes Are Hard To Find Tour not to feature vocalist Stevie Nicks, who quit the group in 1991 but later rejoined in 1997. It is also the only tour to feature country vocalist Bekka Bramlett (daughter of Delaney and Bonnie) and former Traffic guitarist Dave Mason and the final to feature guitarist Billy Burnette.

== History ==
Similar to when Fleetwood Mac toured with Lindsey Buckingham and Stevie Nicks prior to the release of their 1975 eponymous release, the band toured without an accompanying album for the purpose of introducing the new lineup to the public. Christine McVie opted not to tour, citing insomnia and her inability to "sleep in strange beds night after night" as some of her reasons for staying off the road, so Steve Thoma covered her keyboard parts for live performances. By September 1994, McVie still had plans to record an album with Fleetwood Mac.

Fleetwood Mac shared the bill with Crosby, Stills & Nash in the summer of 1994, who were celebrating their anniversary. Afterwards, Fleetwood Mac toured across Europe in December. Around that time, Traffic had also reunited for a tour, although Mason was not invited despite being a founding member of that band.

During the 1995 leg of the Another Link in the Chain Tour, Fleetwood Mac shared the ticket with REO Speedwagon and Pat Benatar. At their Tokyo performance, the band was joined onstage by Jeremy Spencer, an original member of Fleetwood Mac who last played with the band in 1971.

The tour was associated with the Time album and included a couple of songs from the forthcoming album. It also featured many of the band's 1970s songs such as "Go Your Own Way" and "Say You Love Me". They also incorporated songs from Dave Mason's time with Traffic, including "Dear Mr. Fantasy" and the Joe Cocker-popularized "Feelin' Alright?". Mason and Bekka Bramlett also performed a duet on "Only You Know and I Know", a song written and first performed by Mason and covered with greater success by Delaney and Bonnie Bramlett when their daughter Bekka was two years-old.

"Landslide" was played at early performances, although the song was later swapped for a cover of John Lennon's "Imagine". Richard O. Jones, who saw the band perform in summer 1995, wrote that "it was a good concert, and the new members adapted well to the old material, but it clearly wasn't the same." In a 1997 interview, bassist John McVie described the lineup as "a very good, tight band. But it was a losing proposition. We'd go out and just lose money, which no one could afford to do. So New Year's Eve two years ago we said, 'Well that's it'. Knock it on the head and see where we go from there."

== Set list ==
1. "The Chain"
2. "You Make Loving Fun"
3. "Dreams"
4. "Oh Well"
5. "All Along The Watchtower"
6. "The Bigger The Love"
7. "Blow By Blow"
8. "We Just Disagree"
9. "Gold Dust Woman"
10. "Only You Know and I Know"
11. "World Turning"
12. "Dear Mr. Fantasy"
13. "Say You Love Me"
14. "Don't Stop"
15. "Go Your Own Way"
16. "Tear It Up"
17. "Imagine"

== Personnel ==
- Mick Fleetwood – drums, percussion
- John McVie – bass guitar
- Billy Burnette – rhythm guitar, vocals, maracas
- Dave Mason – guitars, vocals
- Bekka Bramlett – vocals, tambourine, maracas

Touring Members

- Steve Thoma – keyboards
