= John McVie's "Gotta Band" with Lola Thomas =

Studio album by John McVie
- Released: 1992
- Genres: Blues, jazz, pop
- Length: 40:19
- Label: Warner Bros.
- Producer: Dennis Walker

John McVie's "Gotta Band" with Lola Thomas is an album by the British Fleetwood Mac bassist John McVie, released in 1992. American singer Lola Thomas provided vocals throughout, backed by McVie and a crew of session musicians including Fleetwood Mac guitarist Billy Burnette and former Rolling Stone Mick Taylor.

== Track listing ==
1. "Evidence" (Gregg Sutton, John Herron, Bob Pfeifer) – 3:48
2. "Now I Know" (Dennis Morgan, David Malloy, Billy Burnette) – 4:06
3. "Lost What You Had" (Lola Thomas) – 3:31
4. "Shot Down by Love" (Sutton, Sam Brown) – 3:59
5. "Step Aside" (David Plenn, Dennis Walker) – 3:51
6. "You Left Me Lonely" (Thomas, Walker) – 5:14
7. "The Bigger the Love" (Burnette, Larry Henley, Larry Keith) – 3:49
8. "All That I Was Guilty Of..." (Thomas, Sutton) – 3:25
9. "One More Time with Feeling" (Thomas) – 4:56
10. "The Way I Do" (Thomas) – 3:40

== Personnel ==
- John McVie – bass guitar, backing vocals
- Lola Thomas – vocals
- Mick Taylor – guitar
- Billy Burnette – guitar, backing vocals
- David Plenn – guitar
- Jim Pugh – piano, Hammond organ
- Wayne Jackson & Andrew Love – The Memphis Horns
- Lee Spath – drums
- Brad Dutz – percussion
- George Hawkins – backing vocals

Production

- Produced by Dennis Walker
- Executive producer – John McVie
- Second Engineer/Sound City – Jack Hayback
- Mastered by Bernie Grundman
- Photography – Mark Hanauer
- Design – Jeri Heiden
- Recorded at Sound City, Sunnyside Studios, and Paramount Studios, Los Angeles; and Fantasy Studios and Studio "D" Recording, San Francisco. Mixed at Ardent Studios, Memphis, by John Hampton, assisted by G.E. Teel.
