= Maple Jam Music Group =

Artist management/publicity group

Maple Jam Music Group was an artist management/publicity group started by Greg Ladanyi, Starr Andreeff and Mike Renault in 2007 and based in Los Angeles. The group is notable for Renault's management of Hollywood Undead and Type O Negative and Ladanyi's producing of Anna Vissi. It is now called "Maple Jam Management Group".
