= Save Me (Fleetwood Mac song) =

1990 single by Fleetwood Mac

Single by Fleetwood Mac

from the album Behind the Mask
- B-side: "Another Woman" (live)
- Released: March 1990
- Genre: Rock
- Length: 4:13 (album version); 3:50 (fade)
- Label: Warner Bros.
- Songwriters: Christine McVie; Eddy Quintela
- Producers: Greg Ladanyi; Fleetwood Mac

Fleetwood Mac singles chronology
"Hold Me" (1989)	"Save Me" (1990)	"Skies the Limit" (1990)

"Save Me" is a song by British-American band Fleetwood Mac from their 15th studio album, Behind the Mask, released as a single in 1990. Written and sung by Christine McVie, it was the group's last top-40 hit in the United States, where it reached No. 33. "Save Me" achieved modest success in the United Kingdom, where it peaked at No. 53. It also reached the top 10 in Canada, Finland, and the Netherlands. The song was, as the slightly shorter single edit, included in the group's 2018 compilation 50 Years – Don't Stop.

== Background ==
"Save Me" was issued as the lead single in March 1990 in the United States prior to the release of Behind the Mask. On 23 April 1990, "Save Me" was released as a single in the UK. Warner Brothers also released an expanded edition of the "Save Me" single on 30 April, which included additional live tracks, an album style jewel box, and an inlay booklet with a family tree, interviews, and photographs. "Another Woman" was included as the single's B-side and was recorded live at the Cow Palace in 1987.

"Save Me" was the second most added song on adult contemporary radio stations reporting to Radio & Records and the most added song to album oriented rock stations for the week dated 30 March 1990, having received 41 and 156 adds in those respective formats. 87 percent of album oriented rock stations reporting to Radio & Records included the song in their playlists that week. The following week, 65 percent of adult contemporary stations reporting to Radio & Records had played the song, resulting in a debut of number 25 on that publication's adult contemporary national airplay chart. For the 7 April 1990 edition of Billboard, "Save Me" entered the US Billboard Hot 100 at number 70 and also received 87 adds to radio stations that reported to the publication, making it the third-most-added song to radio that week. It also debuted at number seven on the Album Rock Tracks chart.

The song entered the top 40 of the Billboard Hot 100 during the week dated 28 April 1990 at number 35. It held that position for three consecutive weeks despite receiving gains in both airplay and sales during that period. In his 100 Singles Spotlight Column for Billboard, Michael Ellis commented that the song was prevented from ascending the Hot 100 due to stiff competition further up the chart. The following week, the song made further gains in sales and airplay, vaulting it up to its peak position of number 33 on the Billboard Hot 100. "Save Me" spent a total of 11 weeks on the Hot 100, five of which were in the top 40.

At the time "Save Me" was climbing the charts, Fleetwood Mac was touring in Australia to promote Behind the Mask. Rick Vito, who was one of the guitarists who joined the band to replace Lindsey Buckingham, believed that the single could have achieved more success in the United States if the band was actively touring there during the single's ascension up the charts.

A music video was also released to coincide with the release of the single, which was directed by Erick Ifergan and produced by Mike Bodnarczuk. The video featured members of Fleetwood Mac playing their instruments in front of a black background. Mick Fleetwood, who played drums on the song and was a founding member of Fleetwood Mac, told the Daily Southtown in a June 1990 interview that the band was disappointed with the music video for "Save Me" on the grounds that it was "so stupidly artsy-crafty". He also believed that the music video did not sufficiently showcase the band; he hoped to rectify this issue with the music video for the following single, "Skies the Limit".

== Track listings ==
7-inch single

A. "Save Me"
B. "Another Woman" (live at Cow Palace, San Francisco)

German CD single

1. "Save Me"
2. "Another Woman" (live)
3. "Everywhere" (live)

German maxi-CD single

1. "Save Me" – 4:13
2. "Another Woman" (live) – 3:48
3. "The Second Time" – 2:31

== Personnel ==
- Christine McVie – keyboards, lead vocals
- Rick Vito – lead guitar, backing vocals
- Billy Burnette – rhythm guitar, backing vocals
- Stevie Nicks – backing vocals
- John McVie – bass guitar
- Mick Fleetwood – drums, percussion

== Charts ==
=== Weekly charts ===
Chart (1990)	Peak position
Australia (ARIA)	41
Belgium (Ultratop 50 Flanders)	26
Canada Top Singles (RPM)	7
Canada Adult Contemporary (RPM)	4
Europe (Eurochart Hot 100)	45
European Airplay (Music & Media)	5
Finland (Suomen virallinen lista)	6
Germany (GfK)	36
Netherlands (Dutch Top 40)	9
Netherlands (Single Top 100)	16
New Zealand (Recorded Music NZ)	27
UK Singles (Official Charts)	53
US Billboard Hot 100	33
US Adult Contemporary (Billboard)	6
US Mainstream Rock (Billboard)	3
US Cash Box Top 100	29
US Adult Contemporary (Gavin Report)	4
US Top 40 (Gavin Report)	19
US Adult Contemporary (Radio & Records)	4
US AOR Tracks (Radio & Records)	2
US Contemporary Hit Radio (Radio & Records)	26

=== Year-end charts ===
Chart (1990)	Position
Canada Top Singles (RPM)	74
Canada Adult Contemporary (RPM)	37
Netherlands (Dutch Top 40)	81
US A/C (Gavin Report)	31
US Adult Contemporary (Radio & Records)	39
US AOR Tracks (Radio & Records)	77

== Release history ==
Region	Date	Format(s)	Label(s)	Ref.
United States	March 1990	—N/a	Warner Bros.	
Australia	2 April 1990	7-inch vinyl; cassette	Warner Bros.	
Australia	23 April 1990	CD	Warner Bros.	
United Kingdom	23 April 1990	7-inch vinyl; 12-inch vinyl; CD1; cassette	Warner Bros.	
Japan	25 April 1990	Mini-CD	Warner Bros.	
United Kingdom	30 April 1990	CD2	Warner Bros.	
