= Bekka & Billy =

US musical group (1997–1998)

- Origin: Nashville, Tennessee, U.S.
- Genres: Country
- Years active: 1997–1998
- Label: Almo Sounds
- Spinoff of: Fleetwood Mac
- Past members: Bekka Bramlett; Billy Burnette

Bekka & Billy was an American country music duo consisting of singer-songwriters Bekka Bramlett and Billy Burnette, who first worked together as members of Fleetwood Mac. Their eponymous debut album was released by Almo Sounds in April 1997. While their debut single, "Patient Heart," failed to chart in the United States, it reached No. 96 on the RPM Country Tracks chart in Canada.

Entertainment Weekly gave Bekka & Billy a B rating, saying that if "Patient Heart" didn't become a big hit, Nashville was "asleep at the wheel." AllMusic gave their album three stars, calling the duo "tailor made for stardom." Vince Gill played guitar on the album, which featured a song written by Delaney Bramlett. The duo broke up in January 1998.

== Discography ==
=== Studio albums ===
Title	Details
Bekka & Billy	Release date: April 22, 1997; Label: Almo Sounds; Formats: CD, cassette

=== Singles ===
Year	Single	Peak positions	Album
Year	Single	CAN Country	Album
1997	"Patient Heart"	96	Bekka & Billy
1997	"Better Days"	—	Bekka & Billy
"—" denotes releases that did not chart

=== Music videos ===
Year	Title	Director
1997	"Better Days"	Steven Goldmann
