= Behind the Mask (album) =

1990 album by Fleetwood Mac

Studio album by Fleetwood Mac
- Released: 9 April 1990
- Recorded: 1989–1990
- Studios: The Complex (Los Angeles, California); Vintage Recorders (Phoenix, Arizona).
- Genre: Pop rock
- Length: 54:26
- Label: Warner Bros.
- Producers: Greg Ladanyi, Fleetwood Mac

Fleetwood Mac chronology
Greatest Hits (1988)	Behind the Mask (1990)	25 Years – The Chain (1992)

Singles from Behind the Mask
- 1. "Save Me" Released: March 1990; 2. "Skies the Limit" Released: July 1990 (US); 3. "In the Back of My Mind" Released: August 1990 (UK); 4. "Hard Feelings" Released: October 1990 (US)

Behind the Mask is the fifteenth studio album by British-American rock band Fleetwood Mac, released on 9 April 1990. It was the first album released by the band after the departure of guitarist Lindsey Buckingham (although he did play acoustic guitar on the album's title track). He was replaced by Billy Burnette and Rick Vito, both guitar players, singers, and songwriters. Fleetwood Mac thus became a six-piece band with four singer/songwriters.

The album was not as successful as its predecessor, Tango in the Night, nor did it spawn any big hit singles. "Save Me" made both the American and Canadian Top 40, while "Love Is Dangerous" and "Skies the Limit" enjoyed some airplay. Though Behind the Mask barely reached the US Top 20, the album entered the UK Albums Chart at number 1 and achieved platinum status there. In August 1990, the album was certified Gold in the United States, making it the band's tenth album to do so. Following the album's release and subsequent world tour, band members Stevie Nicks and Rick Vito left the band, though Nicks would rejoin in 1997. The song "Freedom" was written by Stevie Nicks with Tom Petty and the Heartbreakers guitarist Mike Campbell. Campbell would join Fleetwood Mac in 2018.

The cover for the album was created by photographer Dave Gorton. He stated that the band did not wish to appear on the front cover and that Mick Fleetwood suggested creating an image that "spiritually symbolised" the band instead. The cover earned a Grammy nomination in 1991 for "Best Album Package".

The original CD release of the album was among the first to be encoded in the CD+G format, which allows graphics to be shown on a TV screen in time with the music, such as pictures and lyrics.

== Background ==
In 1987, shortly after the release of Tango in the Night, long-time guitarist/vocalist/producer Lindsey Buckingham had left the band. For the accompanying tour, the band recruited Billy Burnette and Rick Vito to replace him. Once the tour concluded, Fleetwood Mac went into the studio to record two new songs for their Greatest Hits compilation album, released in 1988. The new members got the opportunity to record a full album in 1989 when the band began the Behind the Mask sessions.

In need of a new producer, the band first selected Don Gehman, who had produced for John Mellencamp and R.E.M.. The initial sessions did not work out because "the chemistry was not right," according to Christine McVie, so the band instead hired Greg Ladanyi, who had previously worked with Don Henley on his solo albums. Ladanyi was suggested by George Hawkins, who played and sang on Mick Fleetwood's first two solo records. Ladanyi described his role producing the band in a March 1990 interview with Mix magazine.

As a producer with the band, there are things that I am very careful with. One of them is to let them express themselves as a group a lot more. From what I was told, a lot of the organizing came from Lindsey and the way he wanted to do things. This time, they're all collectively putting in their thoughts, and I just kind of shove them all together.

— Greg Ladanyi

== Recording ==
Behind the Mask deviated from the ornate production found on earlier Fleetwood Mac albums in favor of adult-oriented rock. As noted by Nicks, the album was easier to record compared to their other work. "It's not that we didn't take as much time, it's more that the time that we did take was quality time. So, it therefore did not seem to take nearly as long." She explained that the band's dynamics were more positive because there were few serious arguments or disagreements, and that the experience felt like "being in the greatest eighth-grade class in school."

Commenting on the band's approach to recording the album, Christine McVie commented that Fleetwood Mac took a different approach to recording than when Buckingham was in the band. Whereas Buckingham often employed layered guitar overdubs on the band's records for their previous efforts, this method was instead supplanted with a greater use of sampling. In some instances, the band would sample the original demos into a Synclavier and re-record each segment of the demo until none of the original aspects of the song were present. Most of the Synclavier parts on the album were played by Stephen Croes, who would take keyboard parts played by Christine McVie and add further dimensions to her playing. McVie praised Croes for "being so good at imagining a feel" and said that the band ultimately used most of his contributions. She also identified a greater use of keyboards within the arrangements, which she believed afforded her greater latitude in informing the direction of the album.

Several songs on Behind the Mask feature co-writers from both Fleetwood Mac and outside members. Burnette and Vito set aside an afternoon to write "When the Sun Goes Down," and later recorded the song after the rest of the band expressed their willingness to complete it. "When It Comes to Love" stemmed from a collaboration with Burnette, Dennis Morgan, and Simon Climie. Burnette met Morgan in Los Angeles and later befriended Climie, who had also co-written the song "I Knew You Were Waiting (For Me)" with Morgan for Aretha Franklin and George Michael. Lindsey Buckingham stopped by the recording studio to play acoustic guitar on the title track, which was penned by Christine McVie. Vito said that he was not present at the recording studio when Buckingham overdubbed his guitar part; he attributed Buckingham's appearance on the album to Fleetwood's willingness to make amends with Buckingham.

The band spent between eight months and a year making Behind the Mask, which they recorded and mixed at The Complex in Los Angeles. Most of the songs were recorded on a sound stage within the facility, with the intention of achieving a larger drum sound. Ladanyi placed a Neumann M 50 microphone six feet away from the drum kit to capture the room ambiance. According to Ladanyi, this microphone provided him with "50 percent of the sound" that he wanted. He used various other microphones to capture individual components of Fleetwood's drums, including Sanken CU-31s for his five tom drums, which Landanyi selected to minimise audio leakage from the cymbals and snare drum During the sessions, Vito's gear setup included a Dumble amplifier '56 Gibson Les Paul TV, a vintage National resonator guitar, a Stratocaster, a custom Telecaster, a nylon-string guitar that was once owned by Peter Green, and an electric sitar owned by Fleetwood.

== Release ==
The band consulted with Warner Bros. when determining which song to release as the first single from Behind the Mask. The record label suggested "Skies the Limit" as the first single, but the rest of the band recommended two different songs; with the exception of Vito, who wanted "Love Is Dangerous" to be lifted as the album's first single, the band favoured "Save Me", which was ultimately selected as the album's first single. "Skies the Limit" was later lifted as the album's second single and received an accompanying music video, along with "Save Me". Vito said that Warner Bros. was "only interested in the songs that Stevie and Chris brought to the table" and felt that the record label did not want to release either his or Burnette's songs as singles.

In a 2022 interview with Rolling Stone, Burnette commented that he was disappointed that Behind the Mask did not achieve the same level of success as the band's previous albums and that he "just wanted to have hits and be loved by the masses like they were." Vito reflected that "there were so many great things about the whole unit, but we didn't have a super-duper hit like they had on Tango in the Night." Buckingham felt that the album adhered too closely to the band's previous work, saying "it seemed as though they were trying to sort of pick up the ball from where I left it instead of trying to wipe the slate clean."

== Critical reception ==
Professional ratings
Review scores
Source	Rating
AllMusic	1.5/5 stars
Entertainment Weekly	C
Los Angeles Times	3/5 stars
Rolling Stone	4/5 stars

The album received mixed to negative reviews. Entertainment Weekly called the album "pretty bland" and likened it to an "anthology of miscellaneous solo projects." AllMusic retrospectively gave the album 1.5/5 stars, their lowest rating of any Fleetwood Mac album, calling Buckingham's departure "a severe blow" for the band and saying that "the songs are among the least inspired the band ever recorded."

Other critics, however, praised the new line-up. The Los Angeles Times gave the album 3.5/5 stars, commenting that "[w]ithout Buckingham's obsessively unique vision, the group has embraced an all-for-one, one-for-all attitude for what sounds like the most truly group effort since Rumours, or perhaps even since 1972's Bare Trees." Billboard thought that the lineup marked a return to the blues-oriented music from when Peter Green was a member of the band. They also felt that the inclusion of Burnette and Vito prompted Nicks and Christine McVie to contribute their "strongest performances and material in recent years." Rolling Stone rated it as 4/5 stars, claiming that "the addition of Rick Vito and Billy Burnette is the best thing to ever happen to Fleetwood Mac" and that "[n]ot since Rumours has Fleetwood Mac recorded pain so unwaveringly and sounded this together."

== Track listing ==
Behind the Mask track listing
No.	Title	Writer(s)	Lead vocals	Length
1.	"Skies the Limit"	Christine McVie, Eddy Quintela	C. McVie	3:45
2.	"Love Is Dangerous"	Rick Vito, Stevie Nicks	Nicks, Vito	3:18
3.	"In the Back of My Mind"	Billy Burnette, David Malloy	Burnette, C. McVie	7:02
4.	"Do You Know"	Burnette, C. McVie	Burnette, C. McVie	4:19
5.	"Save Me"	C. McVie, Quintela	C. McVie	4:15
6.	"Affairs of the Heart"	Nicks	Nicks	4:22
7.	"When the Sun Goes Down"	Vito, Burnette	Burnette, Vito	3:18
8.	"Behind the Mask"	C. McVie	C. McVie	4:18
9.	"Stand on the Rock"	Vito	Vito	3:59
10.	"Hard Feelings"	Burnette, Jeff Silbar	Burnette	4:54
11.	"Freedom"	Nicks, Mike Campbell	Nicks	4:12
12.	"When It Comes to Love"	Burnette, Dennis Morgan, Simon Climie	Burnette, C. McVie	4:08
13.	"The Second Time"	Nicks, Vito	Nicks	2:31
Total length:				54:26

== Personnel ==
Fleetwood Mac

- Stevie Nicks – vocals
- Christine McVie – vocals, keyboards
- Rick Vito – vocals, lead guitars
- Billy Burnette – vocals, guitars
- John McVie – bass guitar
- Mick Fleetwood – drums, percussion, spoken word on "In the Back of My Mind"

Additional musicians

- Stephen Croes – keyboards, Synclavier programming
- Dan Garfield – keyboard programming
- Lindsey Buckingham – acoustic guitar on "Behind the Mask"
- Okyerema Asanté – percussion on "Freedom"

=== Production ===
- Fleetwood Mac – producers
- Greg Ladanyi – producer, engineer, mixing
- Tim McCarthy – assistant producer
- Bob Levy – engineer
- Dennis Mays – engineer
- Craig Porteils – assistant engineer
- Duane Seykora – assistant engineer
- Brett Swain – assistant engineer
- Paula Wolak – assistant engineer
- Stephen Marcussen – mastering at Precision Lacquer (Hollywood, California)
- John Courage – studio coordinator
- Dennis Dunstan – studio coordinator
- Steve Dikun – guitar technician
- Michael Randolph Reed – drum technician
- Dave Gorton – cover photography
- Jeri Heiden – art direction

== Charts ==
=== Weekly charts ===
Weekly chart performance for Behind the Mask
Chart (1990)	Peak position
Australian Albums (ARIA)	9
Austrian Albums (Ö3 Austria)	19
Canada Top Albums/CDs (RPM)	14
Dutch Albums (Album Top 100)	8
European Albums (Music & Media)	4
Finnish Albums (Suomen virallinen lista)	8
French Albums (IFOP)	36
German Albums (Offizielle Top 100)	4
Greek Albums (IFPI)	1
Icelandic Albums (Tónlist)	5
Irish Albums (IFPI)	3
Italian Albums (Musica e dischi)	20
Japanese Albums (Oricon)	36
New Zealand Albums (RMNZ)	9
Norwegian Albums (VG-lista)	4
Spanish Albums (AFYVE)	35
Swedish Albums (Sverigetopplistan)	4
Swiss Albums (Schweizer Hitparade)	9
UK Albums (Official Charts)	1
US Billboard 200	18
US Cash Box Top 200 Albums	16

=== Year-end charts ===
Year-end chart performance for Behind the Mask
Chart (1990)	Position
Australian Albums (ARIA)	81
Canada Top Albums/CDs (RPM)	63
Dutch Albums (Album Top 100)	47
European Albums (Music & Media)	31
German Albums (Offizielle Top 100)	36
UK Albums (Gallup)	51

== Certifications ==
Certifications for Behind the Mask
Region	Certification	Certified units/sales
Australia (ARIA)	Gold	35,000^{^}
Germany (BVMI)	Gold	250,000^{^}
Netherlands (NVPI)	Gold	50,000^{^}
Switzerland (IFPI Switzerland)	Gold	25,000^{^}
United Kingdom (BPI)	Platinum	300,000^{^}
United States (RIAA)	Gold	500,000^{^}
^{^} Shipments figures based on certification alone.
