= Greg Ladanyi =

American record producer (1952–2009)

- Born: July 6, 1952; Elkhart, Indiana, U.S.
- Died: September 29, 2009 (aged 57) Nicosia, Cyprus
- Genres: Rock
- Occupations: Record producer; audio engineer
- Years active: 1970–2009

Greg Ladanyi (July 6, 1952 – September 29, 2009) was an American record producer and recording engineer of Hungarian descent, known for his work with many musicians, including Jackson Browne, Warren Zevon, The Church, Caifanes, Anna Vissi, Toto, Fleetwood Mac, Don Henley, and Jeff Healey.

== Biography ==
Ladanyi began his career by working on the Linda Ronstadt album Hasten Down the Wind under the tutelage of engineer/producer Val Garay.

Around 1980 Ladanyi expanded from just engineering into production as well. He recounted, "Part of the way I came up into coproducing was by elevating engineering to a point where it has an awful lot to do with the production of the record. That comes from a lot of dialogue with an artist and really taking some responsibility for the way a record comes out, as opposed to just sitting there and doing what an artist or producer needs done." Ladanyi co-produced the Behind the Mask album with Fleetwood Mac. He also co-produced, engineered, and mixed Don Henley's first two solo albums I Can't Stand Still and Building the Perfect Beast. He won a Grammy Award in 1983 in the Best Engineered Recording - Non-Classical category for Toto IV by Toto.

He married Laura Grayson-Ladanyi in 1984 and divorced in 1992. He was a collaborator and co-founder of "The Complex Studios" with George Massenburg from 1987 until 1991. He co-produced Fleetwood Mac's Greatest Hits, Jeff Healey's See the Light, The Church's Under the Milky Way with Waddy Wachtel, various Japanese artists, Clannad, Caifanes, Jaguares, REO Speedwagon, and Engenheiros do Hawaii. He traveled and worked internationally throughout the world till 1998, and managed artists under the name of Ladanyi Entertainment.

In 2007, he partnered with Starr Andreeff and Mike Renault to form Maple Jam Music Group. His most recent work involved producing Ligion's new album, External Affairs. He was also the main producer on Anna Vissi's album, Apagorevmeno, which was released on December 9, 2008, in Greece and Cyprus.

Ladanyi is mentioned in the lyrics for the song "Cocaine" on Jackson Browne's 1977 album Running on Empty.

Ladanyi died on September 29, 2009, after falling 13 feet just 15 minutes before Anna Vissi's performance at Nicosia's GSP Stadium, suffering a fractured skull.

== Partial discography ==
=== Producer/co-producer ===
- Bad Luck Streak in Dancing School (1980) - Warren Zevon
- Hold Out (1980) - Jackson Browne
- Stand in the Fire (1980) - Warren Zevon
- I Can't Stand Still (1982) - Don Henley
- The Envoy (1982) - Warren Zevon
- Lawyers in Love (1983) - Jackson Browne
- Building the Perfect Beast (1984) - Don Henley
- A Quiet Normal Life: The Best of Warren Zevon (1986) - Warren Zevon
- After Dark (1987) - Cruzados
- Sirius (1987) - Clannad
- In the Spirit of Things (1988) - Kansas
- See the Light (1988) - The Jeff Healey Band
- Starfish (1988) - The Church
- Stealin Horses (1988) - Stealin Horses
- The End of the Innocence (1989) - Don Henley
- Behind the Mask (1990) - Fleetwood Mac
- Gypsy Moon (album) (1991) - Troy Newman
- Extraordinary Life (1992) - The Believers
- Kingdom of Desire (1992) - Toto
- El nervio del volcán (1994) - Caifanes
- It's Like This (album) (1995) - Troy Newman
- "Simples de Coração" (1995) - Engenheiros do Hawaii
- Actual Miles: Henley's Greatest Hits (1995) - Don Henley
- Velvet Hammer (Demos) (1996) - Troy Newman
- Los de Abajo (1998) - Los de Abajo
- Bajo el Azul de Tu Misterio (1999) - Jaguares
- Apagorevmeno (2008) - Anna Vissi

=== Engineer only ===
- Running on Empty (1977) (engineer only) - Jackson Browne

=== Mixer ===
- White Shadows (1977) Tim Moore
- Toto IV (1982) - Toto
- Isolation (1984) - Toto
- Victory (1984) (track "Wait") - The Jacksons
- Stationary Traveller (1984) - Camel
