= Fleetwood Mac =

British and American rock band

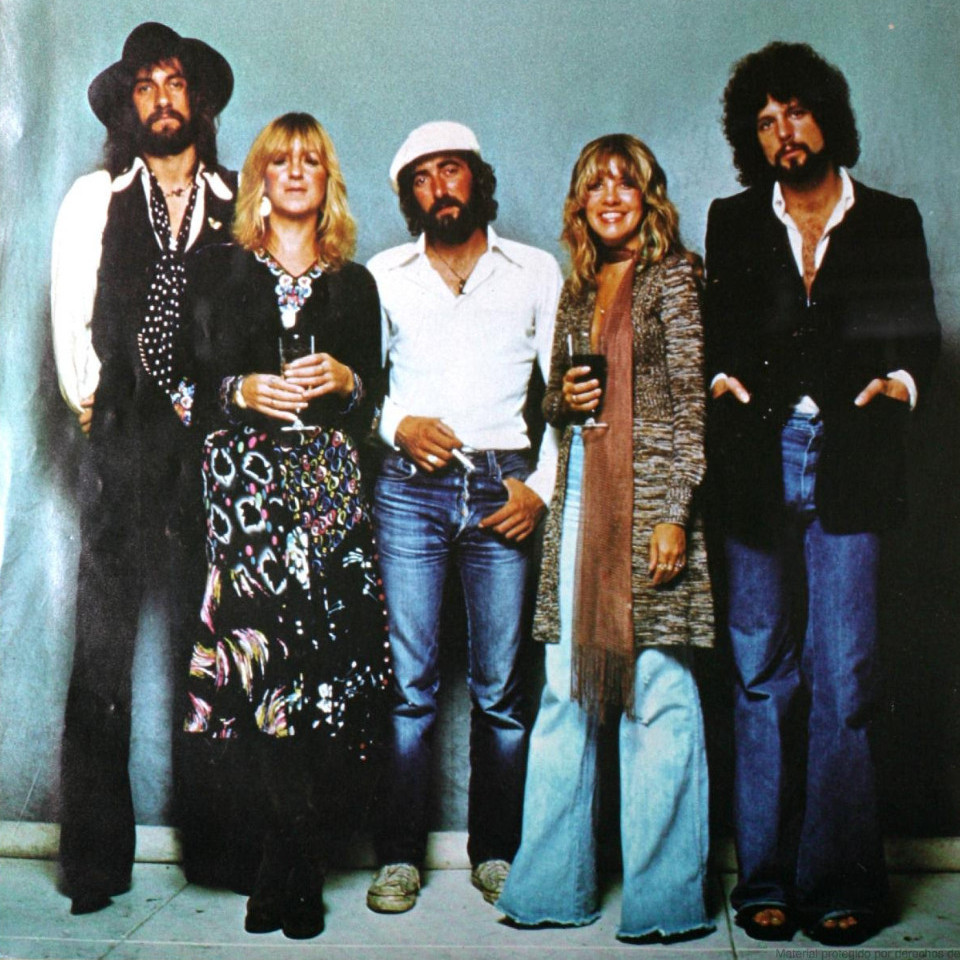
- Classic line-up of Fleetwood Mac in 1977. From left to right: Mick Fleetwood, Christine and John McVie, Stevie Nicks, Lindsey Buckingham

Background information
- Also known as: Peter Green's Fleetwood Mac (1967–1968)
- Origin: London, England
- Genres: Rock; pop; blues; folk
- Works: Discography
- Years active: 1967–1995; 1997–2022
- Labels: Blue Horizon; CBS; Immediate; Reprise; Warner Bros.
- Spinoffs: Tramp; Bekka & Billy; Buckingham McVie
- Spinoff of: John Mayall & the Bluesbreakers; Buckingham Nicks
- Past members: Peter Green; Mick Fleetwood; Jeremy Spencer; Bob Brunning; John McVie; Danny Kirwan; Christine McVie; Bob Welch; Dave Walker; Bob Weston; Lindsey Buckingham; Stevie Nicks; Billy Burnette; Rick Vito; Bekka Bramlett; Dave Mason; Mike Campbell; Neil Finn
- Website: fleetwoodmacofficial.com

Fleetwood Mac were a British and American rock band formed in London in 1967. They have sold more than 120 million records worldwide, making them one of the world's best-selling musical acts. Their 1977 album, Rumours, is one of the best-selling albums of all time and won the Grammy Award for Album of the Year in 1978. In 1979, they were honoured with a star on the Hollywood Walk of Fame, and in 1998 they were inducted into the Rock and Roll Hall of Fame and received the Brit Award for Outstanding Contribution to Music. In 2018, Fleetwood Mac received the MusiCares Person of the Year award from the Recording Academy in recognition of their artistic achievement in the music industry and dedication to philanthropy.

Primarily a British blues band in their early years, the line-up of singers/guitarists Peter Green, Jeremy Spencer and Danny Kirwan, bassist John McVie, and drummer Mick Fleetwood achieved a UK No. 1 single in 1968 with the instrumental "Albatross", and had other UK Top 10 hits with "Man of the World", "Oh Well" (both 1969), and "The Green Manalishi (With the Two Prong Crown)" (1970). Green, Spencer, and Kirwan left the band in succession during 1970–1972, with McVie's wife, singer/keyboardist Christine McVie, and American singer/guitarist Bob Welch joining during this period. 1974 saw the band's relocation to the United States and Welch's departure. Fleetwood and the McVies recruited singer/guitarist Lindsey Buckingham and singer Stevie Nicks at the end of that year, and the first album with this line-up, Fleetwood Mac (1975), topped the Billboard 200 chart in the US, followed by Rumours.

The line-up remained stable through three more studio albums – Tusk (1979), Mirage (1982), and Tango in the Night (1987) – before Buckingham left in 1987 shortly after the latter's release, and was replaced by Billy Burnette and Rick Vito. The sole studio album from this line-up, Behind the Mask (1990), reached No. 1 in the UK, but was less successful in the US. The 1975–1987 line-up reunited for a one-off performance for the first inauguration of President Bill Clinton in 1993, before a full-scale reunion took place four years later, resulting in the band's fourth US No. 1 album, The Dance (1997), a live album marking the 20th anniversary of Rumours and the band's 30th anniversary. Christine McVie left in 1998 but rejoined in 2014. During her departure, Fleetwood, John McVie, Buckingham, and Nicks released the final Fleetwood Mac studio album, Say You Will, in 2003. In 2018, Buckingham was fired and replaced by Mike Campbell (formerly of Tom Petty and the Heartbreakers) and Neil Finn (of Split Enz and Crowded House). In 2024, two years after the death of Christine McVie, Nicks said she believed that the band would not continue.

== History ==
=== 1967–1970: Formation and early years ===
Fleetwood Mac were formed in July 1967 in London, England, by Peter Green after he left the British blues band John Mayall & the Bluesbreakers. Green had previously replaced guitarist Eric Clapton in the Bluesbreakers and had received critical acclaim for his work on their album A Hard Road. Green had been in two bands with Mick Fleetwood, Peter B's Looners and the subsequent Shotgun Express (which featured a young Rod Stewart as vocalist), and suggested Fleetwood as a replacement for drummer Aynsley Dunbar when Dunbar left the Bluesbreakers to join the Jeff Beck Group. John Mayall agreed and Fleetwood joined the Bluesbreakers.

The Bluesbreakers then consisted of Green, Fleetwood, bassist John McVie (a member of the Bluesbreakers since their 1963 formation) and Mayall. Mayall gave Green free recording time as a gift, which Fleetwood, McVie and Green used to record five songs. The fifth song was an instrumental that Green named after the rhythm section, "Fleetwood Mac" ("Mac" being short for McVie).

Soon after this, Green suggested to Fleetwood that they form a new band. The pair wanted McVie on bass and named the band "Fleetwood Mac" to entice him, but McVie opted to keep his steady income with Mayall rather than take a risk with a new band. In the meantime, Green and Fleetwood teamed up with slide guitarist Jeremy Spencer and bassist Bob Brunning. Brunning was in the band on the understanding that he would leave if McVie agreed to join. The band made its debut on Sunday 13 August 1967 at the National Jazz and Blues Festival (a forerunner of the Reading Festival), billed as "Peter Green's Fleetwood Mac featuring Jeremy Spencer". Brunning played only a few gigs with Fleetwood Mac, as within a few weeks of their first show, John McVie agreed to join the band as permanent bassist, after growing disenchanted with Mayall's move to a more jazz-influenced style. With management wanting to capitalise on Green's popularity with the Bluesbreakers, the band would continue to use the name Peter Green's Fleetwood Mac until early 1968 when, at Green's own insistence, the name was officially shortened to Fleetwood Mac.

Fleetwood Mac's self-titled debut album was released by the Blue Horizon label in February 1968. The song "Long Grey Mare" was recorded earlier with Brunning on bass, while the rest of the album was recorded with McVie. The album was successful in the UK and reached no. 4, although no tracks were released as singles. Later in the year, the singles "Black Magic Woman" (later a big hit when covered by Santana) and "Need Your Love So Bad" were released, both going top-forty in the UK.

The band's second studio album, Mr. Wonderful, was released in August 1968. The album was recorded live in the studio with miked amplifiers and a PA system, rather than being plugged into the board. The sessions featured a horn section as well as friend of the band, Christine Perfect of Chicken Shack, on keyboards. Later that year, Chicken Shack scored a British hit with a cover of the Etta James classic "I'd Rather Go Blind", with Perfect on lead vocal. Perfect was voted female artist of the year by Melody Maker in 1969 and 1970.

Shortly after the release of Mr. Wonderful, 18-year-old guitarist Danny Kirwan joined the band, making Fleetwood Mac a five-piece with three guitarists. Kirwan had previously been in the South London blues trio Boilerhouse with Trevor Stevens (bass) and Dave Terrey (drums). Green and Fleetwood had watched Boilerhouse rehearse in a basement boiler-room, and Green had been so impressed that he invited the band to play support slots for Fleetwood Mac. Green wanted Boilerhouse to become a professional band, but Stevens and Terrey were not prepared to turn professional, so Green tried to find another rhythm section for Kirwan by placing an ad in Melody Maker. There were over 300 applicants, but when Green and Fleetwood ran auditions at the Nag's Head in Battersea (home of the Mike Vernon's Blue Horizon Club) Green could not find anyone good enough. Instead, Fleetwood invited Kirwan to join Fleetwood Mac as a third guitarist.

In November 1968, with Kirwan in the band, they released their first number-one single in Europe, "Albatross", an instrumental with lead guitar by both Green and Kirwan. Green said later that the success of "Albatross" was thanks to Kirwan: "If it wasn't for Danny, I would never have had a number one hit record." In January 1969, the compilation album English Rose was released in the US, while a similar compilation album, The Pious Bird of Good Omen, was released in the UK in August.

On tour in the United States in January 1969, the band recorded Fleetwood Mac in Chicago (released in December as a double album) at the soon-to-close Chess Records Studio with some of the blues legends of Chicago, including Willie Dixon, Buddy Guy and Otis Spann. These were Fleetwood Mac's last all-blues recordings, with the band moving more towards rock. Along with the change of style, the band was also going through label changes. In early 1969, the band left Blue Horizon and signed with Immediate Records, releasing the single "Man of the World", which became another British and European hit. For the B-side, Spencer fronted Fleetwood Mac as "Earl Vince and the Valiants" and recorded "Somebody's Gonna Get Their Head Kicked In Tonite", typifying the more raucous rock 'n' roll side of the band. Immediate Records was in bad shape however, so the band shopped around for a new deal. The Beatles wanted the band on Apple Records, but the band's manager Clifford Davis decided to go with Warner Bros. Records (through Reprise Records, a Frank Sinatra-founded label), the label they have stayed with ever since.

Under the wing of Reprise, Fleetwood Mac released their third studio album, Then Play On, in September 1969. Although the initial pressing of the American release of this album was the same as the British version, it was altered in early 1970 to include the single "Oh Well", which had been another UK hit for the band in late 1969 as well as their first entry into the Billboard Hot 100 in the US. "Oh Well" has since been a Fleetwood Mac staple, featuring consistently in live performances from the time of its release through 1997 and again starting in 2009. The songwriting for Then Play On, which saw the band broaden their style away from straight blues, was handled mostly by Green and Kirwan. Spencer did not contribute any songs, but released a solo album in early 1970, which featured backing from Fleetwood, McVie and Kirwan.

By 1969, Green was using LSD. During a European tour towards the end of that year, he experienced a bad acid trip at a hippie commune in Munich. Clifford Davis, the band's manager, singled out this incident as the crucial point in Green's mental decline. He said: "The truth about Peter Green and how he ended up how he did is very simple. We were touring Europe in late 1969. When we were in Germany, Peter told me he had been invited to a party. I knew there were going to be a lot of drugs around and I suggested that he didn't go. But he went anyway and I understand from him that he took what turned out to be very bad, impure LSD. He was never the same again." German author and filmmaker Rainer Langhans stated in his autobiography that he and his then-girlfriend, model Uschi Obermaier, met Green in Munich and invited him to their Highfisch-Kommune, where the drinks were spiked with acid. Langhans and Obermaier were planning to organise an open-air "Bavarian Woodstock", for which they wanted Jimi Hendrix and the Rolling Stones to be the main acts. Already in contact with Hendrix, they hoped Green would help them to get in contact with the Rolling Stones.

Green's last studio recording with Fleetwood Mac was "The Green Manalishi (With the Two Prong Crown)" and its B-side, "World in Harmony". The tracks were recorded at Warner-Reprise's studios in Hollywood on the band's third US tour in April 1970, a few weeks before Green left the band. Released as a single the following month, it made No. 10 in the UK. Prior to its studio recording, the band had played the song live at the Boston Tea Party in February 1970. Some recordings of the three Boston Tea Party gigs (5–7 February 1970) were eventually released in 1985 as the Live in Boston album. An expanded, three-volume edition of Live in Boston was released in 1998. "Green Manalishi" was released as Green's mental stability deteriorated. He wanted the band to give all their money to charity, but the other members of the band disagreed. In April 1970, Green decided to quit the band after the completion of their European tour. His last show with Fleetwood Mac was on 20 May 1970.

Fleetwood Mac performing in Hannover, 18 March 1970
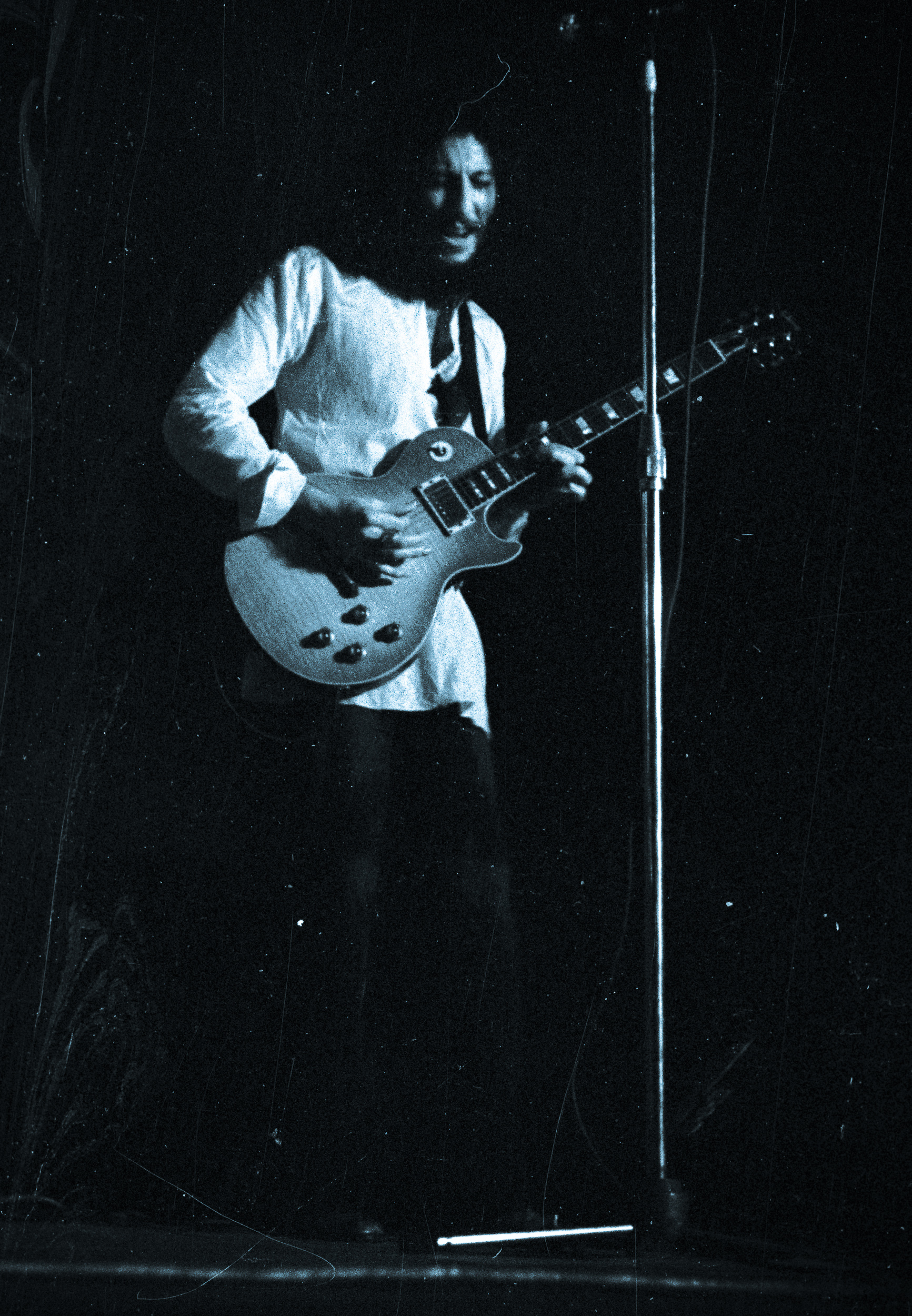
Peter Green

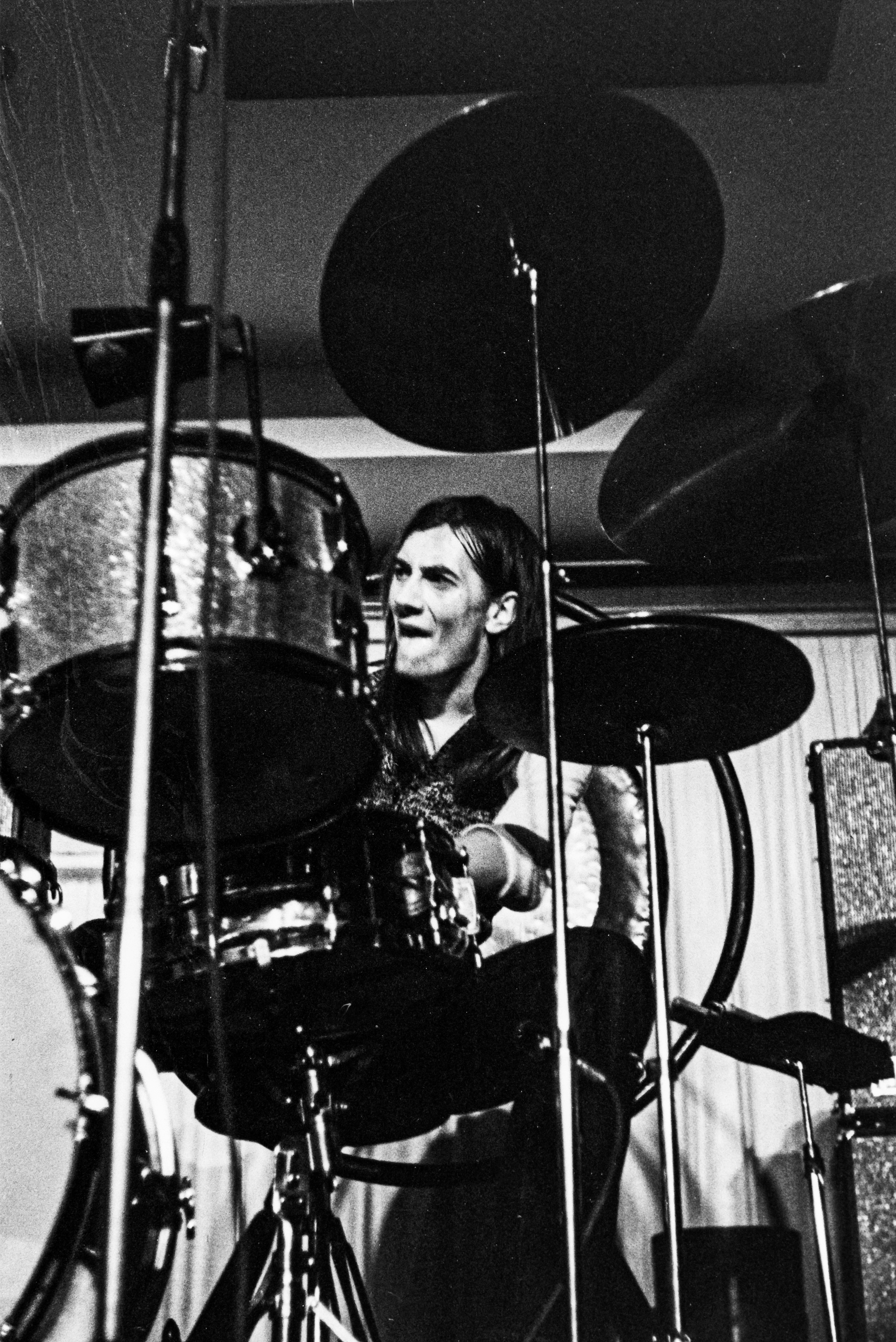
Mick Fleetwood

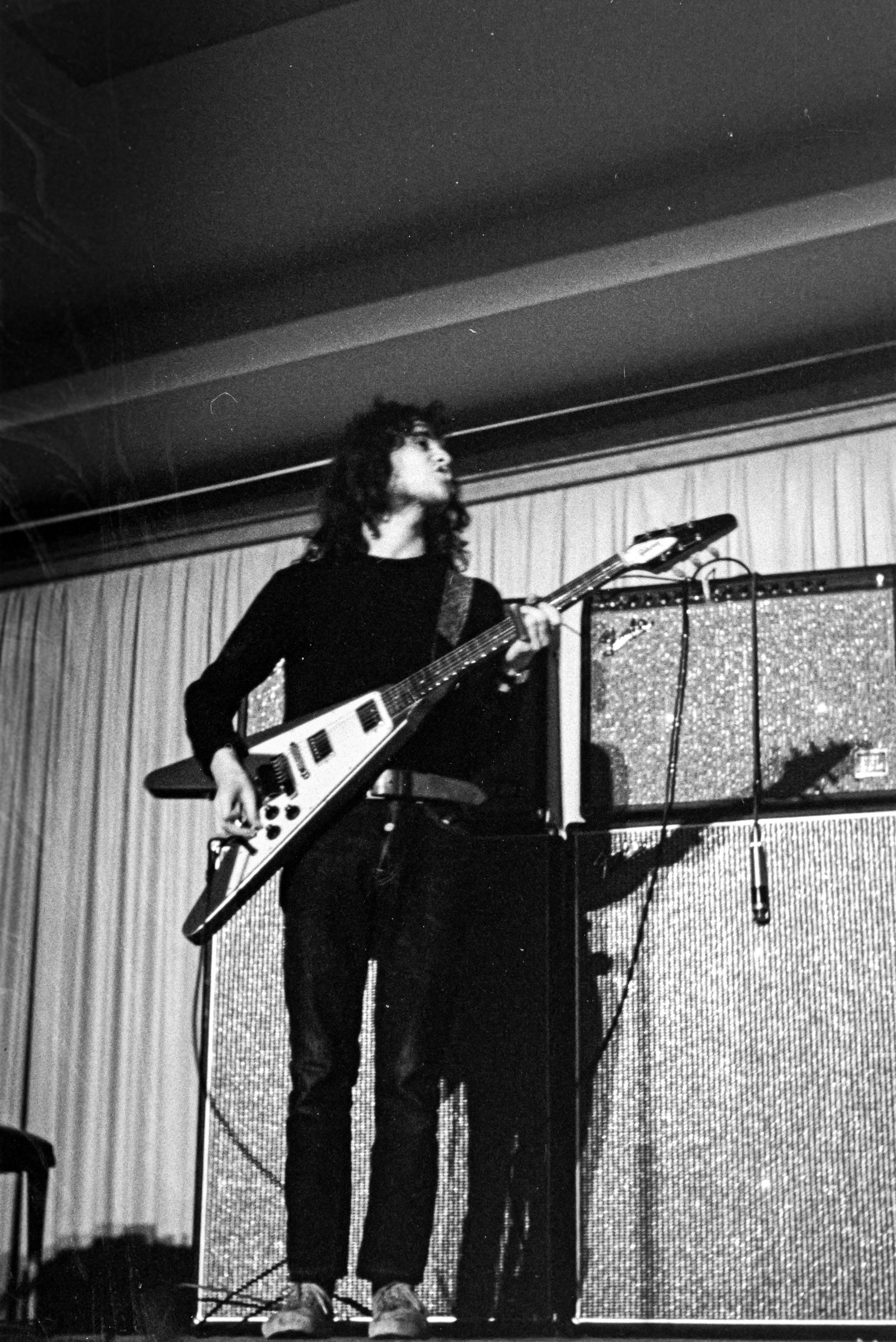
Jeremy Spencer

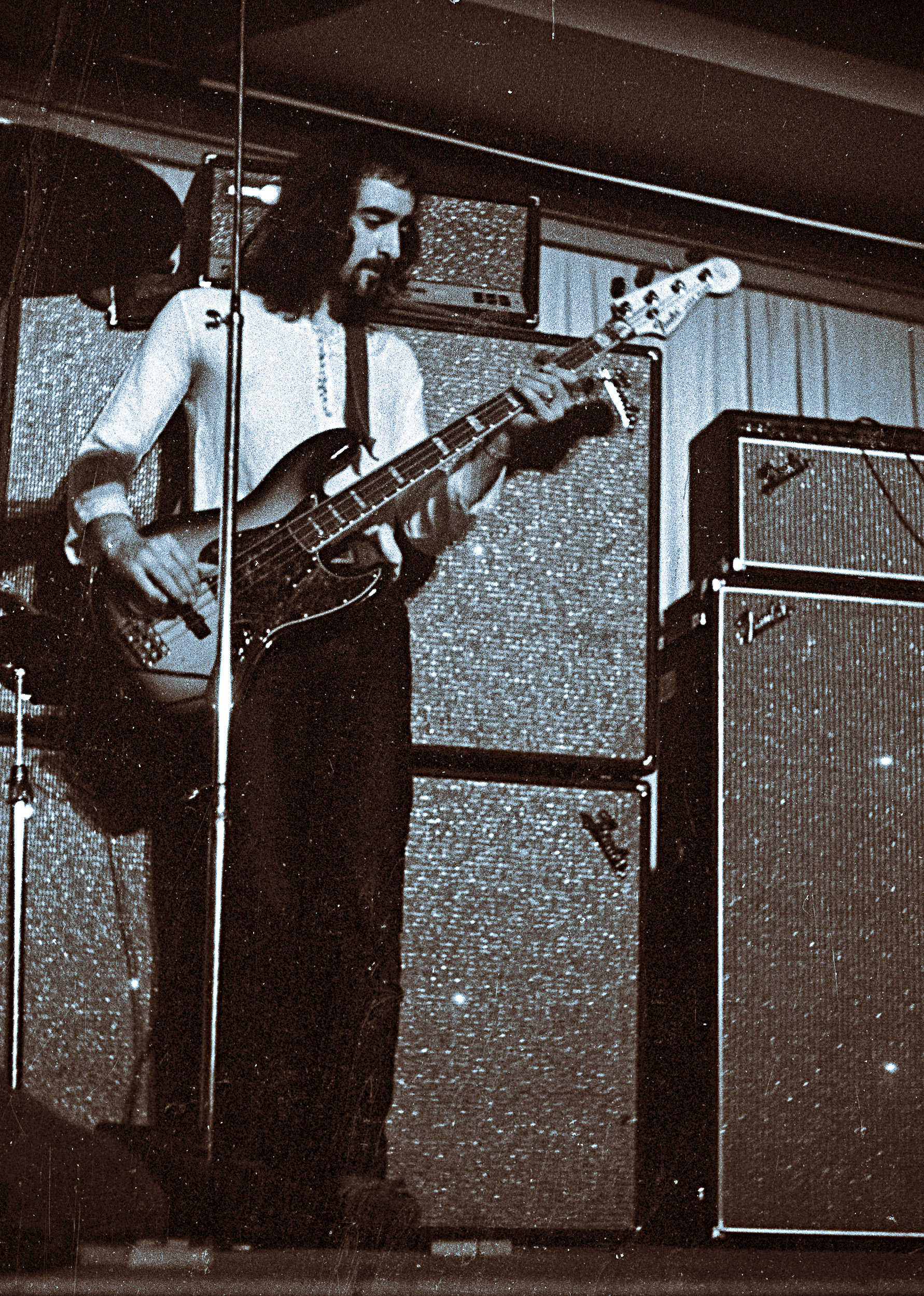
John McVie

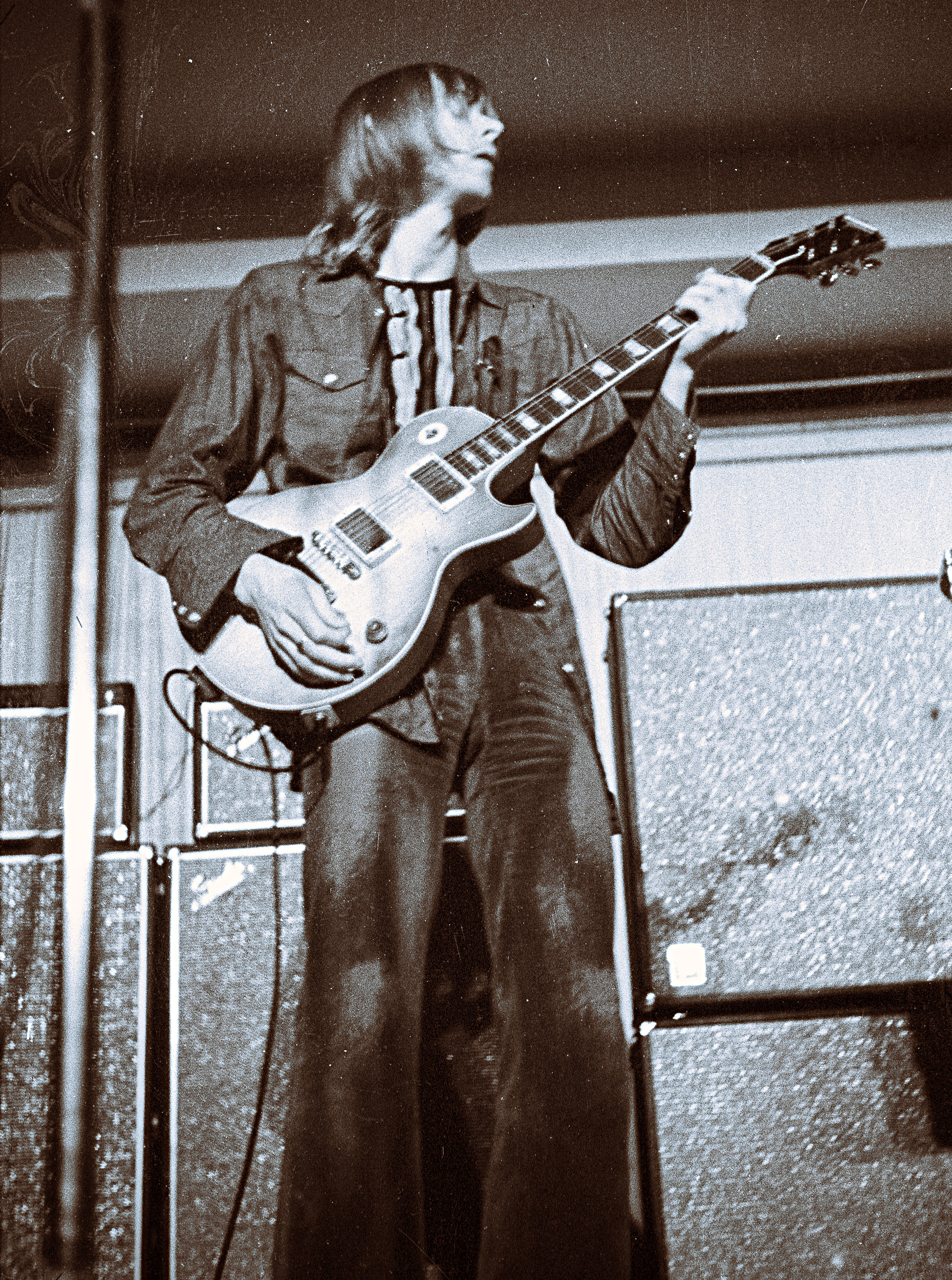
Danny Kirwan

=== 1970–1973: Transitional era ===
After Green's departure, the four remaining members—Fleetwood, McVie, Spencer and Kirwan—set about working on their next album. In September 1970, Fleetwood Mac released their fourth studio album, Kiln House, to generally positive reviews. Kirwan's songs on the album moved the band in a melodic rock direction, while Spencer's contributions focused on re-creating the country-tinged "Sun Sound" of the late 1950s. Christine Perfect, now Christine McVie following her marriage to John McVie, had retired from the music business after one unsuccessful solo album, though she contributed (uncredited) to Kiln House, singing backup vocals and playing keyboards. She also drew the album cover. After Kiln House, Fleetwood Mac were progressing and developing a new sound, and she was invited to join the band to help fill in the rhythm section. The first time she had played live with the band had been a guest appearance at Bristol University, England, in May 1969, just as she was leaving Chicken Shack, while her first gig as an official member of the band was on 1 August 1970 in New Orleans, Louisiana. In early 1971, the band released a non-album single, Danny Kirwan's "Dragonfly" b/w "The Purple Dancer" in the UK and certain European countries, but despite good notices in the press, it was not a success. In 1971, CBS Records, which now owned Fleetwood Mac's original record company Blue Horizon (except in the US and Canada), released the band's third compilation album, The Original Fleetwood Mac, containing previously unreleased material from 1967 and 1968.

While on a US tour in February 1971, Jeremy Spencer said he was going out to "get a magazine" but never returned. After several days of frantic searching, the band discovered that Spencer had joined a religious group, the Children of God. The band were liable for the remaining shows on the tour and asked Peter Green to step in as a replacement. Green brought along his friend Nigel Watson, who played the congas (twenty-five years later Green and Watson collaborated again to form the Peter Green Splinter Group), and insisted on playing only new material and none he had written. Green and Watson played the last week of the tour, with a show in San Bernardino on 20 February 1971 being recorded. Green did not want to re-join the band permanently, and a search for a guitarist to replace Spencer began after the tour was completed.

In the summer of 1971, the band held auditions for a replacement guitarist at their large country home, "Benifold", which they had jointly bought with their manager Davis for £23,000 (equivalent to £315,500 in 2025) prior to the Kiln House tour. A friend of the band, Judy Wong, recommended her high school friend Bob Welch, who was living in Paris, France, at the time. The band held a few meetings with Welch and decided to hire him, without actually playing with him, after they heard a tape of his songs.

In September 1971, the band released their fifth studio album, Future Games. As a result of Welch's arrival and Spencer's departure, the album was different from anything they had done previously, with the band moving further away from their blues rock roots towards a more melodic rock style, and vocal harmonies starting to become a key part of their sound. While it became the band's first studio album to miss the charts in the UK, it helped to expand the band's appeal in the US. In Europe, CBS released Fleetwood Mac's first Greatest Hits album in late 1971.

In 1972, six months after the release of Future Games, the band released their sixth studio album, Bare Trees. Mostly composed by Kirwan, Bare Trees featured the Welch-penned single "Sentimental Lady", which would be a much bigger hit for Welch five years later when he re-recorded it for his solo album French Kiss, backed by Mick Fleetwood and Christine McVie. Bare Trees also featured "Spare Me a Little of Your Love", a Christine McVie song that became a staple of the band's live act throughout the early to mid-1970s.

While the band was doing well in the studio, their tours started to be problematic. By 1972, Kirwan had developed an alcohol dependency and was becoming alienated from Welch and the McVies. In August 1972, before a concert on a US tour, Kirwan smashed his Gibson Les Paul Custom guitar and refused to go on stage. The band played the show as a quartet, after which Kirwan criticised their performance, and he was subsequently fired from the band.

Following Kirwan's departure, the band recruited guitarist Bob Weston and vocalist Dave Walker, the latter formerly of Savoy Brown and Idle Race. Bob Weston was well known as a slide guitarist and had known the band from his touring period with Long John Baldry. Fleetwood Mac also hired Savoy Brown's road manager, John Courage. Fleetwood, the McVies, Welch, Weston and Walker recorded the band's seventh studio album, Penguin, which was released in January 1973. After the subsequent tour, the band fired Walker because they felt his vocal and performance style did not fit well with the rest of the band.

Fleetwood Mac in 1973 with Christine McVie, Mick Fleetwood, Bob Weston, John McVie and Bob Welch.

The remaining five members carried on and recorded the band's eighth studio album, Mystery to Me. This album contained Welch's song "Hypnotized", which received strong radio airplay. While Mystery to Me eventually received a Gold certification from the RIAA, personal problems within the band emerged. The McVies' marriage was under a lot of stress, which was aggravated by their constant working with each other and by John McVie's considerable alcohol abuse.

In 1973, Weston had an affair with Fleetwood's wife Jenny Boyd, sister of George Harrison's first wife Pattie Boyd. Fleetwood found out two weeks into a US tour. His devastation led to the band firing Weston and cancelling the remaining 26 dates of the tour. The last date played was Lincoln, Nebraska, on 20 October 1973. In a late-night meeting after that show, the band told their sound engineer that the tour was over and Fleetwood Mac was splitting up.

=== 1973–1974: Name dispute and "fake Fleetwood Mac" ===
In late 1973, after the collapse of the US tour, the band's manager, Clifford Davis, was left with major touring commitments to fulfill and no band. Fleetwood Mac had "temporarily disbanded" in Nebraska and its members had gone their separate ways. Davis was concerned that failing to complete the tour would destroy his reputation with bookers and promoters. He sent the band a letter in which he said he "hadn't slaved for years to be brought down by the whims of irresponsible musicians". Davis claimed that he owned the name 'Fleetwood Mac' and the right to choose the band members. He recruited members of the band Legs, which had recently issued one single under Davis's management, to tour the US in early 1974 under the name "The New Fleetwood Mac" and perform the rescheduled dates. This band—who former vocalist Dave Walker said were "very good"—consisted of Elmer Gantry (Dave Terry, formerly of Velvet Opera: vocals, guitar), Kirby Gregory (formerly of Curved Air: guitar), Paul Martinez (formerly of the Downliners Sect: bass), John Wilkinson (also known as Dave Wilkinson: keyboards) and Australian drummer Craig Collinge (formerly of Manfred Mann Chapter Three, The Librettos, Procession and Third World War). The members of this group were told that Mick Fleetwood would join them on the tour to validate the use of the name. Fleetwood said later that he had not agreed to be part of the tour.

The "New Fleetwood Mac" tour began on 16 January 1974 at the Syria Mosque in Pittsburgh, Pennsylvania, and was initially successful. One of the band members said the first concert "went down a storm". The promoter was dubious at first but said later that the crowd had loved the band and they were "actually really good". More successful gigs followed, but then word got around that this was not the real Fleetwood Mac and audiences became hostile. The band was turned away from several gigs and the next six shows were pulled by promoters. The band struggled on and played further dates in the face of increasing hostility and heckling. More dates were pulled, the keyboard player quit, and after a concert in Edmonton where bottles were thrown at the stage, the tour collapsed. The band dissolved and the remainder of the tour was cancelled.

The lawsuit that followed regarding who owned the rights to the name "Fleetwood Mac" put the real Fleetwood Mac on hiatus for almost a year. Their record company, Warner Bros. Records, when appealed to, said they did not know who owned it. The dispute was eventually settled out of court, four years later, in what was described as "a reasonable settlement not unfair to either party". In later years Fleetwood said that, in the end, he was grateful to Davis because the lawsuit was the reason the band moved to California.

Nobody from the alternative line-up was ever made a part of the real Fleetwood Mac, although some of them later played in Danny Kirwan's studio band. Gantry and Gregory went on to become members of Stretch, whose 1975 UK hit single "Why Did You Do It?" was written about the touring debacle. Gantry later collaborated with the Alan Parsons Project. Martinez went on to play with the Deep Purple offshoot Paice Ashton Lord, as well as Robert Plant's backing band.

=== 1974: Return of the authentic Fleetwood Mac ===
While the fake Fleetwood Mac were on tour, Welch stayed in Los Angeles and connected with entertainment attorneys. He realised that Fleetwood Mac was being neglected by Warner Bros and that they would need to change their base of operation from England to America, to which the rest of the band agreed. The presence of a false Fleetwood Mac had also confused matters. Rock promoter Bill Graham wrote a letter to Warner Bros to convince them that the real Fleetwood Mac was Mick Fleetwood, John McVie, Christine McVie, and Bob Welch. This did not end the legal battle, but the band was able to record as Fleetwood Mac again. Instead of hiring another manager, Fleetwood Mac, having re-formed, became the only major rock band managed by the artists themselves.

In September 1974, Fleetwood Mac signed a new recording contract with Warner Bros but remained on the Reprise label. In the same month, the band released their ninth studio album, Heroes Are Hard to Find. This was the first time Fleetwood Mac had only one guitarist. While on tour, they briefly added a second keyboardist, Doug Graves, who had been an engineer on Heroes Are Hard to Find. In 1980, Christine McVie said Graves had been there to back her up, but after the first two or three concerts it was decided that she was better off without him: "The band wanted me to expand my role and have a little more freedom, but he didn't play the same way I did." Keyboard player Robert ("Bobby") Hunt, who had been in the band Head West with Bob Welch in 1970, replaced Graves for the remaining dates on the tour but was not invited to join the band full time. By the time the tour ended (on 5 December 1974 at California State University, Northridge), the Heroes album had reached a higher position on the American charts than any of the band's previous records.

=== 1974–1987: Addition of Buckingham and Nicks, and global success ===
In Bob Welch's words, following the Heroes are Hard to Find tour, "the buzz that the Mystery to Me band had started to create...[was] gone. I [was] totally exhausted by writing, singing, touring, negotiating, moving, and frankly so [were] Mick, John and Chris. We were all discouraged that Heroes [hadn't] done better. Something needs to change, but what? ... There was also a kind of fatigue, anger and bitterness that all the work we had done hadn't really paid off and we were just all sort of shaking our heads saying 'what do we do now' ... Everybody knew that we had to find some new creative juice." Welch himself had grown tired of the constant struggles to keep Fleetwood Mac functioning and was openly considering leaving the band.

Whilst Fleetwood was checking out Sound City Studios in Los Angeles during the autumn of 1974, the house engineer, Keith Olsen, played him a track he had recorded, "Frozen Love", from the album Buckingham Nicks (1973). Fleetwood liked it and was introduced to the guitarist from the band, Lindsey Buckingham, who was at Sound City that day recording demos. Fleetwood asked him to join Fleetwood Mac, and Buckingham agreed, on the condition that his music partner and girlfriend, Stevie Nicks, be included. Welch considered remaining as part of this extended lineup but opted to depart for a solo career. Buckingham and Nicks joined the band on New Year's Eve 1974.

In 1975, the new line-up released their first album together, the self-titled Fleetwood Mac, the band's tenth studio album overall. The album was a breakthrough for the band and became a huge hit, reaching No. 1 in the US and selling over 7 million copies. Among the hit singles from this album were Christine McVie's "Over My Head" and "Say You Love Me" and Stevie Nicks' "Rhiannon", as well as the much-played album track "Landslide", a live rendition of which became a hit twenty years later on The Dance album.

"Landslide" (Fleetwood Mac)
17 second sample from Fleetwood Mac's song "Landslide".

In 1976, the band was suffering from severe stress. With success came the end of John and Christine McVie's marriage, as well as Buckingham and Nicks's long-term romantic relationship. Fleetwood, meanwhile, was in the midst of divorce proceedings from his wife, Jenny, and had also begun an affair with Nicks. The pressure on Fleetwood Mac to release a successful follow-up album, combined with their new-found wealth, led to creative and personal tensions which were allegedly fuelled by high consumption of drugs and alcohol.

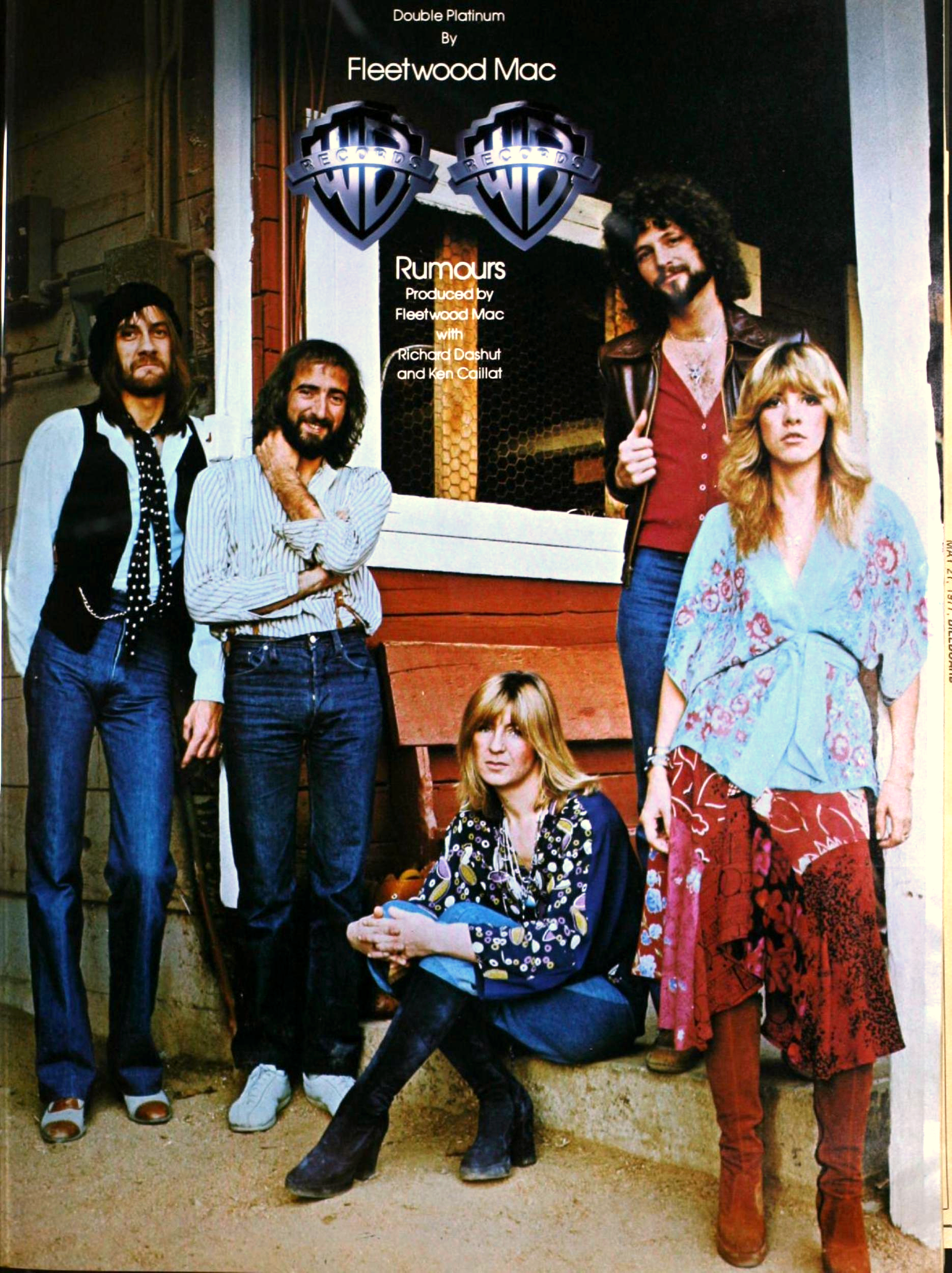
1977 trade ad for Rumours with Mick Fleetwood, John McVie, Christine McVie, Lindsey Buckingham and Stevie Nicks

The band's eleventh studio album, Rumours (the band's first release on the main Warner label after Reprise was retired and all of its acts were reassigned to the parent label), was released in February 1977. In this album, the band members laid bare the emotional turmoil they were experiencing at the time. Rumours was critically acclaimed and won the Grammy Award for Album of the Year in 1977. The album generated four top-ten singles: Buckingham's "Go Your Own Way", Nicks' US No. 1 "Dreams", and Christine McVie's "Don't Stop" and "You Make Loving Fun". Buckingham's "Second Hand News", Nicks' "Gold Dust Woman", and "The Chain" (the only song written by all five band members) also received significant radio airplay. By 2003, Rumours had sold over 19 million copies in the US alone (certified as a diamond album by the RIAA) and a total of 40 million copies worldwide, bringing it to eighth on the list of best-selling albums. Fleetwood Mac supported the album with a lucrative tour.

On 10 October 1979, Fleetwood Mac were honoured for their contributions to the music industry with a star on the Hollywood Walk of Fame at 6608 Hollywood Boulevard.

Buckingham convinced Fleetwood to let his work on their next album be more experimental and to be allowed to work on tracks at home before bringing them to the rest of the band in the studio. The result of this, the band's twelfth studio album Tusk, was a 20-track double album released in 1979. It produced three hit singles: Buckingham's "Tusk" (US No. 8), which featured the USC Trojan Marching Band; Christine McVie's "Think About Me" (US No. 20); and Nicks' six-and-a-half minute opus "Sara" (US No. 7), cut to four-and-a-half minutes for the single. Original guitarist Peter Green also took part in the sessions of Tusk, although his playing on the Christine McVie track "Brown Eyes", is not credited on the album. In an interview in 2019, Fleetwood described Tusk as his "personal favourite" and said, "Kudos to Lindsey ... for us not doing a replica of Rumours."

Tusk sold four million copies worldwide. Fleetwood blamed the album's relative lack of commercial success on the RKO radio chain having played the album in its entirety prior to release, thereby allowing mass home taping.

The band embarked on an 11-month tour to support and promote Tusk. They travelled around the world, including the US, Australia, New Zealand, Japan, France, Belgium, Germany, the Netherlands, and the United Kingdom. In Germany, they shared the bill with reggae musician Bob Marley. On this world tour, the band recorded music for their first live album, which was released at the end of 1980.

The band's thirteenth studio album, Mirage, was released in 1982. Following 1981 solo albums by Nicks (Bella Donna), Fleetwood (The Visitor), and Buckingham (Law and Order), there was a return to a more conventional approach. Buckingham had been chided by critics, fellow band members, and music business managers for the lesser commercial success of Tusk. Recorded at Château d'Hérouville in France and produced by Richard Dashut, Mirage was an attempt to recapture the huge success of Rumours. Its hits included Christine McVie's "Hold Me" and "Love in Store" (co-written by Robbie Patton and Jim Recor, respectively), Nicks' "Gypsy", and Buckingham's "Oh Diane", which made the Top 10 in the UK. A minor hit was also scored by Buckingham's "Can't Go Back".

In contrast to the Tusk Tour, the band embarked on only a short tour of 18 American cities, with the Los Angeles show being recorded and released on video. They also headlined the first US Festival, on 5 September 1982, for which the band was paid $500,000 (equivalent to $1,668,000 in 2024). Mirage was certified double platinum in the US.

Following Mirage the band went on hiatus, which allowed members to pursue solo careers. Nicks released two more solo albums (1983's The Wild Heart and 1985's Rock a Little). Buckingham issued Go Insane in 1984, the same year that Christine McVie made an eponymous album (yielding the Top 10 hit "Got a Hold on Me" and the Top 40 hit "Love Will Show Us How"). All three became successful in their solo efforts, with Nicks being the most popular. During this period, Fleetwood had filed for bankruptcy, Nicks was admitted to the Betty Ford Clinic for addiction problems, and John McVie had suffered an addiction-related seizure—all of which were attributed to the lifestyle of excess afforded to them by their worldwide success. It was rumoured that Fleetwood Mac had disbanded, but Buckingham commented that he was unhappy at allowing Mirage to remain the band's last effort.

The lineup featuring Fleetwood, the McVies, Buckingham, and Nicks recorded one more album, their fourteenth studio album, Tango in the Night, in 1987. The recording started off as a Buckingham solo album before becoming a full group project. The album went on to become their best-selling release since Rumours, especially in the UK where it hit No. 1 three times in the following year. The album sold three million copies in the US and contained four hits: Christine McVie's "Little Lies" and "Everywhere" ("Little Lies" being co-written with her new husband, Eddy Quintela), Sandy Stewart and Nicks' "Seven Wonders", and Buckingham's "Big Love". "Family Man" (Buckingham and Richard Dashut) and "Isn't It Midnight" (Christine McVie) were also released as singles.

=== 1987–1995: Departures of Buckingham and Nicks ===
With a ten-week tour scheduled, Buckingham held back at the last minute, saying he felt his creativity was being stifled. A group meeting at Christine McVie's house on 7 August 1987 resulted in turmoil. Tensions were coming to a head. Fleetwood said in his autobiography that there was a physical altercation between Buckingham and Nicks. Buckingham left the band the following day. After Buckingham's departure, Fleetwood Mac added two new guitarists to the band, Billy Burnette and Rick Vito, again without auditions.

Burnette was the son of Dorsey Burnette and nephew of Johnny Burnette, both of The Rock and Roll Trio. He had already worked with Fleetwood in Zoo, with Christine McVie as part of her solo band, had done some session work with Nicks, and backed Buckingham on Saturday Night Live. Fleetwood and Christine McVie had played on his Try Me album in 1985. Vito, a Peter Green admirer, had played with many artists from Bonnie Raitt to John Mayall, to Roger McGuinn in Thunderbyrd and worked with John McVie on two Mayall albums.

The 1987–88 "Shake the Cage" tour was the first outing for this line-up. It was successful enough to warrant the release of a concert video, also titled Tango in the Night, which was filmed at San Francisco's Cow Palace arena in December 1987.

Capitalising on the success of the Tango in the Night album, the band released a Greatest Hits album in 1988. It featured singles from the 1975–1988 era and included two new compositions, "No Questions Asked" written by Nicks and Kelly Johnston, and "As Long as You Follow", written by Christine McVie and Quintela. 'As Long as You Follow' was released as a single in 1988 but only made No. 43 in the US and No. 66 in the UK, although it reached No. 1 on the US Adult Contemporary charts. The Greatest Hits album, which peaked at No. 3 in the UK and No. 14 in the US (though it has since sold over 8 million copies there) was dedicated by the band to Buckingham, with whom they were now reconciled.

In 1990, Fleetwood Mac released their fifteenth studio album, Behind the Mask. With this album, the band veered away from the stylised sound that Buckingham had evolved during his tenure (which was also evident in his solo work) and developed a more adult contemporary style with producer Greg Ladanyi. The album yielded only one Top 40 hit, Christine McVie's "Save Me". Behind the Mask only achieved Gold album status in the US, peaking at No. 18 on the Billboard album chart, though it entered the UK Albums Chart at No. 1. It received mixed reviews and was seen by some music critics as a low point for the band in the absence of Buckingham (who had actually made a guest appearance playing on the title track). But Rolling Stone magazine said that Vito and Burnette were "the best thing to ever happen to Fleetwood Mac". The subsequent "Behind the Mask" tour saw the band play sold-out shows at London's Wembley Stadium. In the final show in Los Angeles, Buckingham joined the band onstage. The two women of the band, McVie and Nicks, had decided that the tour would be their last (McVie's father had died during the tour), although both stated that they would still record with the band. In 1991, however, Nicks and Rick Vito left Fleetwood Mac altogether.

In 1992, Fleetwood arranged a 4-CD box set, spanning highlights from the band's 25-year history, entitled 25 Years – The Chain (a cut-down 2-CD box set, Selections from 25 Years – The Chain, was also released). A notable inclusion in the box set was "Silver Springs", a Nicks composition that was recorded during the Rumours sessions but was omitted from the album and used as the B-side of "Go Your Own Way". Nicks had requested use of this track for her 1991 best-of compilation TimeSpace, but Fleetwood had refused as he had planned to include it in this collection as a rarity. The disagreement between Nicks and Fleetwood garnered press coverage and was believed to have been the main reason for Nicks leaving the band in 1991. The box set also included a new Nicks/Vito composition, "Paper Doll", which was released in the US as a single and produced by Buckingham and Richard Dashut. There were also two new Christine McVie compositions, "Heart of Stone" and "Love Shines". "Love Shines" was released as a single in the UK and elsewhere. Buckingham also contributed a new song, "Make Me a Mask". Fleetwood also released a deluxe hardcover companion book to coincide with the release of the box set, titled My 25 Years in Fleetwood Mac. The volume featured notes written by Fleetwood detailing the band's 25-year history and many rare photographs.

The classic 1974–1987 line-up reunited in 1993 at the request of US President Bill Clinton for his first Inaugural Ball. Clinton had made Fleetwood Mac's "Don't Stop" his campaign theme song. His request for it to be performed at the Inauguration Ball was met with enthusiasm by the band, although this line-up had no intention of reuniting permanently.

Inspired by the new interest in the band, Mick Fleetwood, John McVie, Christine McVie, and Billy Burnette recorded another album as Fleetwood Mac, with Bekka Bramlett, who had worked a year earlier with Fleetwood's Zoo, joining the band. Solo singer-songwriter/guitarist and original Traffic member Dave Mason, who had worked with Bekka's parents Delaney & Bonnie twenty-five years earlier, was also added.

Although she remained an official band member and would be part of the next studio album, Christine McVie chose to take a break from touring around this time. The other five members (Fleetwood, J. McVie, Burnette, Bramlett and Mason) toured in 1994, opening for Crosby, Stills & Nash, and in 1995 as part of a package with REO Speedwagon and Pat Benatar. This tour saw the band perform classic Fleetwood Mac songs spanning the band's whole history to that point. In 1995, at a concert in Tokyo, the band was greeted by former member Jeremy Spencer, who performed a few songs with them.

On 10 October 1995, Fleetwood Mac released their sixteenth studio album, Time, which was not a success. Although it hit the UK Top 50 for one week, the album had zero impact in the US. It failed to graze the Billboard Top 200 albums chart, a reversal for a band that had been a mainstay on that chart for most of the previous two decades. Shortly after the album's release, Christine McVie informed the band that the album would be her last. Bramlett and Burnette subsequently formed a country music duo, Bekka & Billy.

=== 1995–2008: Reformation, reunion, and Christine McVie's departure ===
Just weeks after disbanding Fleetwood Mac, Mick Fleetwood started working with Lindsey Buckingham again. John McVie was added to the sessions, and later Christine McVie. Stevie Nicks also enlisted Buckingham to produce a song for a soundtrack. In May 1996, Fleetwood, John McVie, Christine McVie, and Nicks performed together at a private party in Louisville, Kentucky, prior to the Kentucky Derby, with Steve Winwood filling in for Buckingham. A week later, the Twister film soundtrack was released, which featured the Nicks-Buckingham duet "Twisted", with Fleetwood on drums. This eventually led to a full reunion of the Rumours line-up, which officially reformed in March 1997.

The regrouped Fleetwood Mac performed a live concert on a soundstage at Warner Bros. Burbank, California, on 22 May 1997. Buckingham said in an interview with Mojo magazine regarding the five of them coming together again that their "chemistry was very present". The concert was recorded and filmed, and from this performance came the 1997 live album and video The Dance, which brought the band back to the top of the US album charts for the first time in ten years. In addition to live performances of their most notable songs, the album also featured new songs including "Bleed to Love Her" and "Temporary One". The album was certified five million units by the RIAA. An arena tour followed the MTV premiere of The Dance video and kept the reunited Fleetwood Mac on the road throughout much of 1997, the 20th anniversary of Rumours. With additional musicians Neale Heywood on guitar, Brett Tuggle on keyboards, Lenny Castro on percussion and Sharon Celani (who had toured with the band in the late 1980s) and Mindy Stein on backing vocals, this would be the final appearance of the classic line-up including Christine McVie for 16 years.

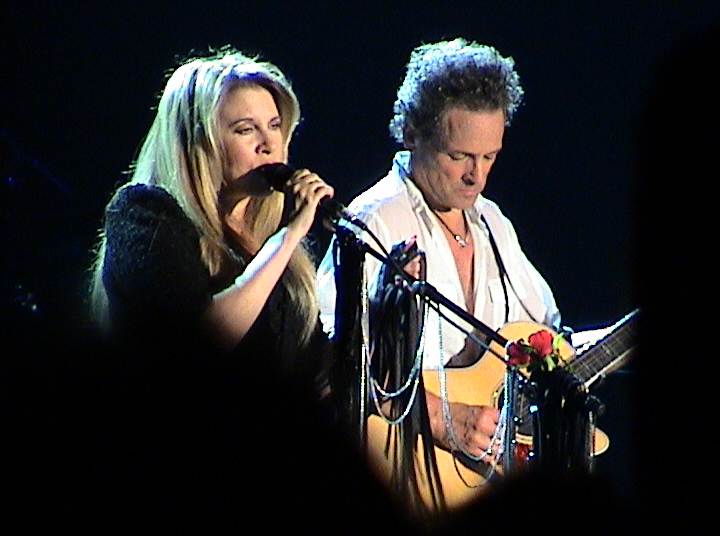
Stevie Nicks and Lindsey Buckingham on the Say You Will Tour, 2003

In 1998, Fleetwood Mac were inducted into the Rock and Roll Hall of Fame. Members inducted were the 1968–1970 band—Mick Fleetwood, John McVie, Peter Green, Jeremy Spencer, and Danny Kirwan—and Rumours-era members Christine McVie, Stevie Nicks, and Lindsey Buckingham. Bob Welch was not included, despite his key role in keeping the band alive during the early 1970s. The Rumours-era version of the band performed both at the induction ceremony and at the Grammy Awards programme that year. Peter Green attended the induction ceremony but did not perform with his former bandmates, opting instead to perform his composition "Black Magic Woman" with Santana, who were inducted the same night. Neither Jeremy Spencer nor Danny Kirwan attended. Fleetwood Mac also received the "Outstanding Contribution to Music" award at the Brit Awards (British Phonographic Industry Awards) the same year. Shortly after this, Christine McVie officially left the band.

2002 saw the release of The Very Best of Fleetwood Mac, issued as a 21-track single CD in the UK and a 40-track double CD in the US. Christine McVie's departure left Buckingham and Nicks as the two singer-songwriters on the band's seventeenth studio album, Say You Will, released in 2003 (although Christine contributed some backing vocals and keyboards as a guest). The album debuted at No. 3 on the Billboard 200 chart (No. 6 in the UK) and yielded chart hits with "Peacekeeper" and the title track, and a successful world arena tour which lasted through 2004. The tour grossed $27,711,129 and was ranked No. 21 in the top 25 grossing tours of 2004.

Around 2004–05, there were rumours of a reunion of the early line-up of Fleetwood Mac involving Peter Green and Jeremy Spencer. While these two apparently remained unconvinced, in April 2006 bassist John McVie, during a question-and-answer session on the Penguin Fleetwood Mac fan website, said of the reunion idea:

If we could get Peter and Jeremy to do it, I'd probably, maybe, do it. I know Mick would do it in a flash. Unfortunately, I don't think there's much chance of Danny doing it. Bless his heart.

In interviews given in November 2006 to support his solo album Under the Skin, Buckingham stated that plans for the band to reunite once more for a 2008 tour were still in the cards. Recording plans had been put on hold for the foreseeable future. In an interview Nicks gave to the UK newspaper The Daily Telegraph in September 2007, she stated that she was unwilling to carry on with the band unless Christine McVie returned.

=== 2008–2013: Touring activity ===
In March 2008, it was mooted that Sheryl Crow might work with Fleetwood Mac in 2009. Crow and Stevie Nicks had collaborated in the past and Crow had stated that Nicks had been a great teacher and inspiration to her. Later, Buckingham said that the potential collaboration with Crow had "lost its momentum" and the idea was abandoned.

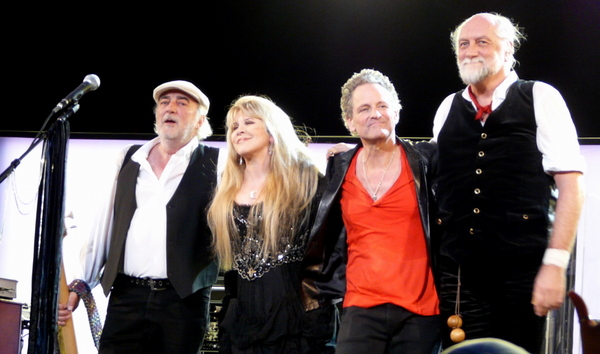
Fleetwood Mac in Saint Paul, Minnesota in 2009

In March 2009, Fleetwood Mac started their "Unleashed" tour, again without Christine McVie. It was a greatest hits show, although album tracks such as "Storms" and "I Know I'm Not Wrong" were also played. During their show on 20 June 2009 in New Orleans, Louisiana, Stevie Nicks premiered part of a new song that she had written about Hurricane Katrina. The song was later released as "New Orleans" on Nicks's 2011 album In Your Dreams with Mick Fleetwood on drums. In October 2009 and November, the band toured Europe, followed by Australia and New Zealand in December. In October, 2002's The Very Best of Fleetwood Mac was re-released in the UK, this time using the US 2-CD track listing, entering at number six on the UK Albums Chart. On 1 November 2009 a one-hour documentary, Fleetwood Mac: Don't Stop, was broadcast in the UK on BBC One, featuring interviews with all four of the band members at the time. During the documentary, Nicks gave a candid summary of the current state of her relationship with Buckingham, saying, "Maybe when we're 75 and Fleetwood Mac is a distant memory, we might be friends."

On 6 November 2009, Fleetwood Mac played the last show of the European leg of their Unleashed tour at London's Wembley Arena. Christine McVie was in the audience. Nicks paid tribute to her from the stage to a standing ovation from the audience, saying that she thought about her former bandmate "every day", and dedicated that night's performance of "Landslide" to her. On 19 December 2009, Fleetwood Mac played the second-to-last show of their Unleashed tour to a sell-out crowd in New Zealand, at what was intended to be a one-off event at the TSB Bowl of Brooklands in New Plymouth. Tickets, after pre-sales, sold out within twelve minutes of public release. Another date, Sunday 20 December, was added and also sold out. The tour grossed $84,900,000 and was ranked No. 13 in the highest grossing worldwide tours of 2009. On 19 October 2010, Fleetwood Mac played a private show at the Phoenician Hotel in Scottsdale, Arizona for TPG (Texas Pacific Group).

On 3 May 2011, the Fox Network broadcast an episode of Glee entitled "Rumours" that featured six songs from the band's 1977 album. The show sparked renewed interest in the band and its most commercially successful album, and Rumours re-entered the Billboard 200 chart at No. 11 in the same week that Nicks's solo album In Your Dreams debuted at No. 6. (She was quoted by Billboard saying that her new album was "my own little Rumours.") The two recordings sold about 30,000 and 52,000 units respectively. Music downloads accounted for 91 per cent of the Rumours sales. The spike in sales for Rumours represented an increase of 1,951%. It was the highest chart entry by a previously issued album since The Rolling Stones' reissue of Exile On Main St. re-entered the chart at No. 2 on 5 June 2010. In an interview in July 2012 Nicks confirmed that the band would reunite for a tour in 2013.

Original Fleetwood Mac bassist Bob Brunning died on 18 October 2011 at the age of 68. Former guitarist and singer Bob Weston was found dead on 3 January 2012 at the age of 64. Former singer and guitarist Bob Welch was found dead from a self-inflicted gunshot wound on 7 June 2012 at the age of 66. Don Aaron, a spokesman at the scene, stated, "He died from an apparent self-inflicted gunshot wound to the chest." A suicide note was found. Welch had been struggling with health issues and was dealing with depression. His wife discovered his body.

The band's 2013 tour, which took place in 34 cities, started on 4 April in Columbus, Ohio. The band performed two new songs ("Sad Angel" and "Without You"), which Buckingham described as some of the most "Fleetwood Mac-ey"-sounding songs since Mirage. "Without You" was rerecorded from the Buckingham-Nicks era. The band released their first new studio material in ten years, Extended Play, on 30 April 2013. The EP debuted and peaked at No. 48 in the US and produced one single, "Sad Angel".

On 25 and 27 September 2013, the second and third nights of the band's London O2 shows, Christine McVie joined them on stage for "Don't Stop". "[Buckingham's] words to us were, 'She can't just come and go,'" Nicks recalled. "That's important to him, but it's not so important to me... Much as Lindsey adores her – and he does; she's the only one in Fleetwood Mac he was ever really willing to listen to – he doesn't want the first-night reviews to be all about Christine's one song, rather than the set we rehearsed for two months. But it will be wonderful to have her back up there – and, from there, who knows?"

On 27 October 2013, the band cancelled their New Zealand and Australian performances after John McVie had been diagnosed with cancer so that he could undergo treatment. They said: "We are sorry not to be able to play these Australian and New Zealand dates. We hope our Australian and New Zealand fans as well as Fleetwood Mac fans everywhere will join us in wishing John and his family all the best." Also in October 2013, Stevie Nicks appeared in American Horror Story: Coven with Fleetwood Mac's song "Seven Wonders" playing in the background. In November 2013, Christine McVie expressed interest in a return to Fleetwood Mac, and also affirmed that John McVie's prognosis was "really good".

=== 2014–2022: Buckingham's departure, death of Christine McVie ===
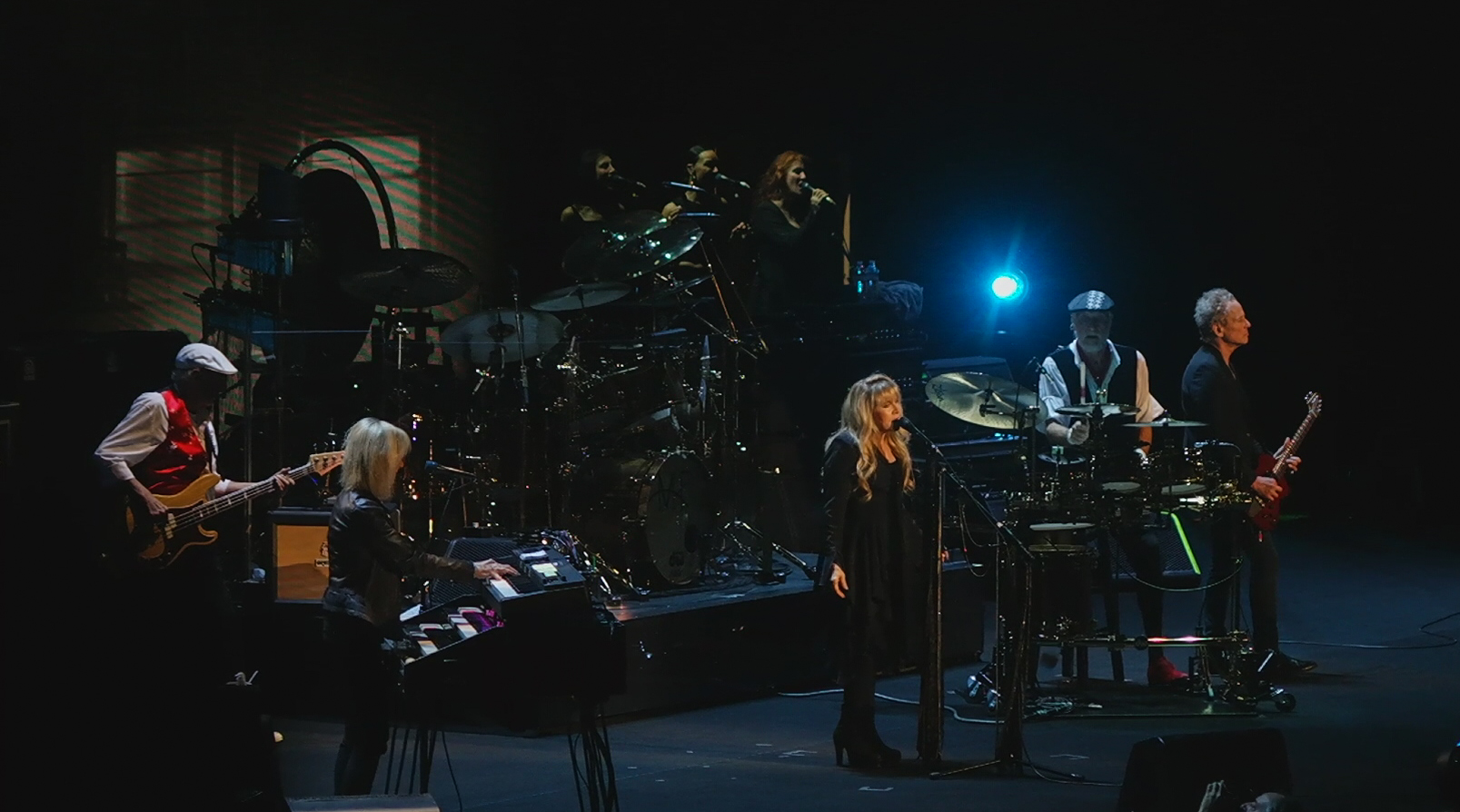
Fleetwood Mac performing in Sacramento, California, 2014

On 11 January 2014, Mick Fleetwood confirmed that Christine McVie would be rejoining Fleetwood Mac. The band launched the On with the Show tour in Minneapolis, Minnesota, on 30 September 2014, marking McVie's first full-show appearance with the group since 1997. United Kingdom arena dates scheduled for May–June 2015 sold out within minutes, leading to additional shows, including an Australian leg.

In early 2015, Lindsey Buckingham suggested that the ongoing tour and a planned new album could represent the band's final major phase, while still emphasizing that work on the Fleetwood Mac album would continue and solo projects would become a lower priority for a period. Mick Fleetwood later said the record could take several years to complete, citing Stevie Nicks' ambivalence at the time about committing to a full album.

In August 2016, Fleetwood said the band had recorded a large amount of material, although little of it featured Nicks; he added that Buckingham and Christine McVie had provided many songs for the project. Nicks later said she was reluctant to commit to an extended recording period with the group followed by a major tour cycle.

On 9 June 2017, Buckingham and McVie released the collaborative album Lindsey Buckingham/Christine McVie, which included contributions from Fleetwood and John McVie. A 38-date tour in support of the album ran from 21 June to 16 November 2017. During the same period, Fleetwood Mac headlined the second nights of the Classic West concert (16 July 2017, Dodger Stadium) and the Classic East concert (30 July 2017, Citi Field). Plans for further touring in 2018 were reported, including suggestions from some sources that it could be framed as a farewell run.

In January 2018, Fleetwood Mac received the MusiCares Person of the Year award, reuniting to perform at the Grammy-hosted gala held in their honour. In April 2018, "Dreams" returned to the charts amid renewed attention from a viral meme, which also boosted consumption of Rumours.

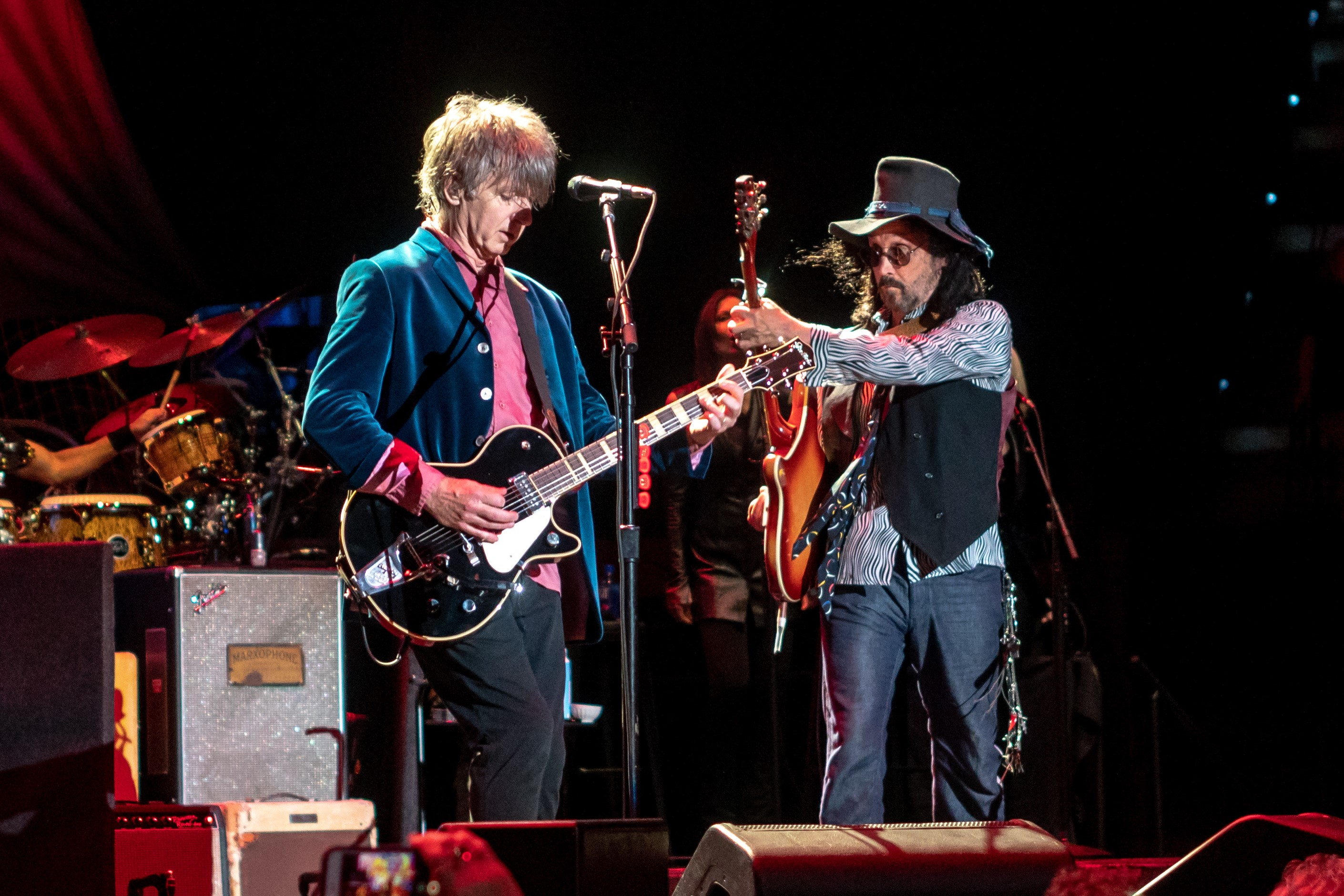
Neil Finn (left) and Mike Campbell (right) performing with Fleetwood Mac in 2018. Both joined the band following Lindsey Buckingham's departure that same year.

In April 2018, Buckingham departed from the group for a second time, with reports describing the split as a dismissal. The departure was linked to disagreements over tour planning and setlist direction. Fleetwood later said Buckingham would not approve the long-planned tour, leading to an impasse, while emphasizing continued respect for Buckingham's work with the band.

In October 2018, Buckingham filed a lawsuit against Fleetwood Mac, alleging multiple claims related to his departure. The case later ended in a settlement, with terms undisclosed. Buckingham later described the split as escalating after the MusiCares event, citing disputes involving management and internal band dynamics, including his account of how Nicks' position regarding his continued participation was conveyed to the group.

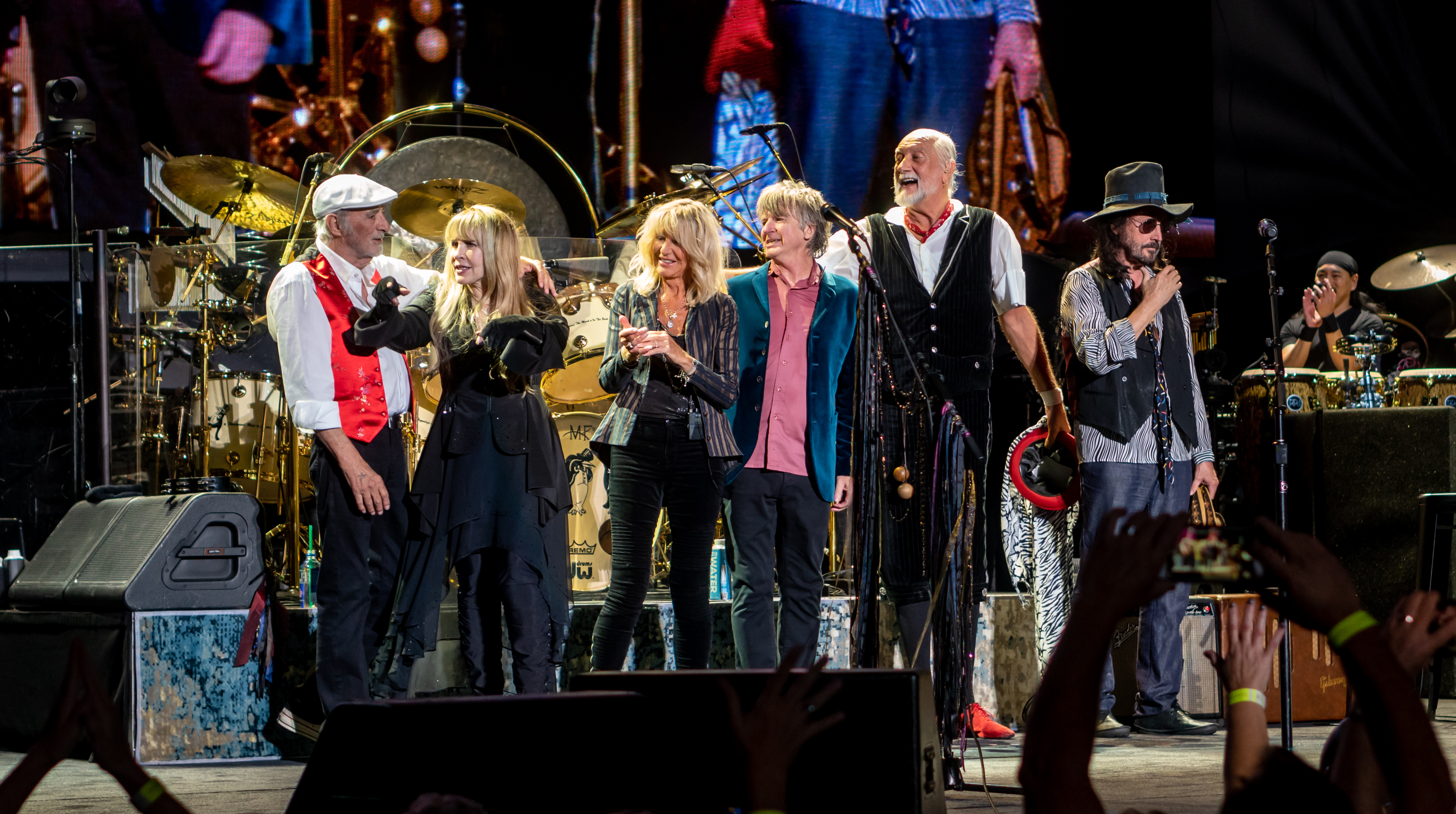
Fleetwood Mac in October 2018

Former Tom Petty and the Heartbreakers guitarist Mike Campbell and Neil Finn of Crowded House were named as Buckingham's replacements. The lineup launched the "An Evening with Fleetwood Mac" tour in 2018, following a performance at the iHeartRadio Music Festival on 21 September 2018 at the T-Mobile Arena in Las Vegas.

On 8 June 2018, former Fleetwood Mac guitarist Danny Kirwan died at the age of 68 in London, after contracting pneumonia earlier in the year. Mojo later cited Christine McVie praising Kirwan's distinctive musicianship and songwriting.

On 28 May 2020, Neil Finn released "Find Your Way Back Home" for the Auckland homeless shelter Auckland City Mission, featuring Nicks and McVie, with Campbell on guitar. Founding member Peter Green died on 25 July 2020 at the age of 73. In October 2020, Rumours re-entered the Billboard 200 top 10, driven in part by renewed viral interest in "Dreams".

On 30 November 2022, Christine McVie died at the age of 79. In February 2023, Fleetwood said he believed the band was effectively finished, with the surviving members focused on other musical activity. Later that year, Nicks said she saw no reason to continue Fleetwood Mac after McVie's death, a view she reiterated in interviews in 2024. In September 2024, Fleetwood said he remained open to reassembling the band.

== Tours ==
- Early gigs (1967)
- First Tour (1968)
- Mr. Wonderful Tour (1968–1969)
- Then Play On Tour (1969–1970)
- Kiln House Tour (1970–1971)
- Future Games Tour (1971)
- British Are Coming Tour (1972)
- Bare Trees Tour (1972)
- Penguin Tour (1973)
- Mystery to Me Tour (1973)
- Heroes Are Hard to Find Tour (1974)
- Fleetwood Mac Tour/Summer Tour '76 (1975–1976)
- Rumours Tour (1977–1978)
- Tusk Tour (1979–1980)
- Mirage Tour (1982)
- Shake the Cage Tour (1987–1988)
- Behind the Mask Tour (1990)
- Another Link in the Chain Tour (1994–1995)
- The Dance Tour (1997)
- Say You Will Tour (2003–2004)
- Unleashed Tour (2009)
- Fleetwood Mac Live Tour (2013)
- On with the Show Tour (2014–2015)
- An Evening with Fleetwood Mac Tour (2018–2019)

== Musical style ==
Fleetwood Mac's musical style has been described as pop rock, soft rock, blues rock, British blues, art pop, and folk rock. While describing the evolution of their sound, Stephen Thomas Erlewine of AllMusic wrote, "Originally, guitarists Peter Green and Jeremy Spencer provided the group with their gutsy psychedelic blues-rock sound, then the band moved toward pop/rock with the addition of keyboardist/songwriter Christine McVie." With the arrival of Buckingham and Nicks, the group completed their move toward "California pop" rooted in American folk stylings.

== Band members ==
=== Final lineup ===
- Mick Fleetwood – drums, percussion (1967–1995, 1997–2022)
- John McVie – bass (1967–1995, 1997–2022)
- Christine McVie – keyboards, vocals (1970–1995, 1997–1998, 2014–2022; her death)
- Stevie Nicks – vocals (1974–1990, 1997–2022)
- Mike Campbell – lead guitar, vocals (2018–2022)
- Neil Finn – rhythm guitar, vocals (2018–2022)

=== Former members ===
- Peter Green – guitar, vocals (1967–1970; died 2020)
- Jeremy Spencer – slide guitar, vocals (1967–1971)
- Bob Brunning – bass (1967; died 2011)
- Danny Kirwan – guitar, vocals (1968–1972; died 2018)
- Bob Welch – guitar, vocals (1971–1974; died 2012)
- Bob Weston – guitar (1972–1973; died 2012)
- Dave Walker – vocals (1972–1973)
- Lindsey Buckingham – guitar, vocals (1974–1987, 1997–2018)
- Billy Burnette – guitar, vocals (1987–1995)
- Rick Vito – guitar, vocals (1987–1990)
- Bekka Bramlett – vocals (1994–1995)
- Dave Mason – guitar, vocals (1994–1995)

== Discography ==
Studio albums

- Fleetwood Mac (1968, also known as Peter Green's Fleetwood Mac)
- Mr. Wonderful (1968)
- Then Play On (1969)
- Kiln House (1970)
- Future Games (1971)
- Bare Trees (1972)
- Penguin (1973)
- Mystery to Me (1973)
- Heroes Are Hard to Find (1974)
- Fleetwood Mac (1975)
- Rumours (1977)
- Tusk (1979)
- Mirage (1982)
- Tango in the Night (1987)
- Behind the Mask (1990)
- Time (1995)
- Say You Will (2003)

== Awards and nominations ==
Award	Year	Nominees	Category	Result	Ref.
American Music Awards	1978	Fleetwood Mac	Favorite Pop/Rock Band/Duo/Group	Won	
American Music Awards	1978	Rumours	Favorite Pop/Rock Album	Won	
American Music Awards	1979	Rumours	Favorite Pop/Rock Album	Nominated	
American Music Awards	1979	Fleetwood Mac	Favorite Pop/Rock Band/Duo/Group	Nominated	
American Music Awards	1983	Fleetwood Mac	Favorite Pop/Rock Band/Duo/Group	Nominated	
American Music Awards	1983	Mirage	Favorite Pop/Rock Album	Nominated	
American Music Awards	2003	Fleetwood Mac	Favorite Pop/Rock Band/Duo/Group	Won	
BMI Pop Awards	1999	"Landslide"	Award-Winning Song	Won	
BMI Pop Awards	1999	"Silver Springs"	Award-Winning Song	Won	

=== Grammy Awards ===
Year	Category	Recording	Result
1978	Album of the Year	Rumours	Won
1978	Best Pop Performance By a Duo or Group	Rumours	Nominated
1978	Best Arrangement of Voices	"Go Your Own Way"	Nominated
1998	Best Pop Vocal Album	The Dance	Nominated
1998	Best Pop Performance By a Duo or Group	"Silver Springs"	Nominated
1998	Best Rock Performance By a Duo or Group	"The Chain"	Nominated
2003	Grammy Hall of Fame Award	Fleetwood Mac	Won

== Sources ==
- Berkery, Patrick. "The Return of the Mac Daddy: Mick Fleetwood". Modern Drummer, Sep 2015. Web. Jul 2016.
- Bob Brunning, Blues: The British Connection, Helter Skelter Publishing, London, 2002, ISBN 1-900924-41-2 – First edition 1986 – Second edition 1995 Blues in Britain
- Bob Brunning, The Fleetwood Mac Story: Rumours and Lies, Omnibus Press London, 1990 and 1998, ISBN 0-7119-6907-8
- Bob Brunning, Fleetwood Mac: The First 30 Years, Omnibus Press, London, 1998, ISBN 978-0-71196-907-0
- Caillat, Ken and Steve Steifel: Making Rumours: The Inside Story of the Classic Fleetwood Mac Album. New Jersey: Wiley, 2012. Print
- Carol Ann Harris, Storms: My Life with Lindsey Buckingham and Fleetwood Mac, Chicago Review Press, 2007, ISBN 978-1-55652-660-2
- Christopher Hjort, Strange brew: Eric Clapton and the British blues boom, 1965–1970, foreword by John Mayall, Jawbone 2007, ISBN 1-906002-00-2
- Dick Heckstall-Smith, The safest place in the world: A personal history of British Rhythm and blues, 1989, Quartet Books Limited, ISBN 0-7043-2696-5, 2nd Ed. : Blowing The Blues – Fifty Years Playing The British Blues, 2004, Clear Books, ISBN 1-904555-04-7
- Evans, Mike, Fleetwood Mac: The Definitive History, Sterling New York, 2011, ISBN 978-1-4027-8630-3
- Fancourt, L., (1989) British blues on record (1957–1970), Retrack Books.
- Fleetwood, Mick, Stephen Davis and Frank Harding. My Twenty-Five Years in Fleetwood Mac. New York, NY: Hyperion, 1992. Print.
- Fleetwood, Mick, and Bozza, Anthony. Play On. New York, NY: Little, Brown, 2014. ISBN 0316403407
- Fortner, Stephen. "Filling Some Mightily High Heels with Fleetwood Mac". Keyboard, Jan 2016. Web. Jul 2016
- Martin Celmins, Peter Green – Founder of Fleetwood Mac, Sanctuary London, 1995, foreword by B.B. King, ISBN 1-86074-233-5
- Mick Fleetwood with Stephen Davis, Fleetwood – My Life and Adventures in Fleetwood Mac, William Morrow and Company, 1990, ISBN 0-688-06647-X
- Shapiro, Harry, Alexis Korner: The Biography, Bloomsbury Publishing PLC, London 1997, Discography by Mark Troster, ISBN 0-7475-3163-3
- Unterberger, Richie, Fleetwood Mac: The Complete Illustrated History. Voyageur Press, 2017. ISBN 1627889752
- Mike Vernon, The Blue Horizon story 1965–1970 vol. 1, notes of the booklet of the Box Set (60 pages)
- Paul Myers, Long John Baldry and the Birth of the British Blues, Vancouver 2007, GreyStone Books, ISBN 1-55365-200-2
