= Billy Burnette =

American guitarist, singer, and songwriter (born 1953)

- Born: Dorsey William Burnette III; May 8, 1953 (age 73); Memphis, Tennessee, U.S.
- Father: Dorsey Burnette
- Relatives: Johnny Burnette (uncle); Rocky Burnette (cousin)
- Musical career
- Genres: Rock; pop; country; rockabilly
- Occupations: Musician, songwriter
- Instruments: Guitar, vocals
- Years active: 1960–present
- Labels: Entrance, Polydor, Columbia, Warner Bros., Capricorn
- Formerly of: Fleetwood Mac, Bekka & Billy, Mick Fleetwood's Zoo
- Website: www.billyburnette.net

Dorsey William Burnette III (born May 8, 1953, in Memphis, Tennessee, United States) is an American guitarist, singer, and songwriter who was part of the band Fleetwood Mac from 1987 to 1996. Burnette also had a brief career in acting.

== Family background ==
The son of Dorsey Burnette and Alberta Burnette, Billy Burnette was born into a musical family. His father and his uncle Johnny Burnette (singer of the 1960 hits "Dreamin'" and "You're Sixteen") were two of the members of the 1950s band The Rock and Roll Trio, which also included Paul Burlison. Johnny had a son named Rocky, born around the time as Billy, who also became a musician.

== Music career ==
=== First recording ===
In the late 1950s, the Burnette family moved to Los Angeles, where his father and uncle worked with Ricky Nelson. Nelson had hit songs with "Believe What You Say", written by Dorsey Burnette and Johnny Burnette, and "It's Late", written by Dorsey.

Billy Burnette made his first recording when he was seven, appearing with Ricky Nelson on the song "Hey Daddy (I'm Gonna Tell Santa On You)" (Dot, 1960).

He toured with Brenda Lee while teaching himself to play guitar. After graduating from high school, his father took him to Memphis to meet record producer Chips Moman, who had recently finished recording Presley's songs "Suspicious Minds" and "In the Ghetto". He went with Moman to Atlanta before going to Nashville in 1971 and collaborating with Larry Henley. In addition to songwriting, Burnette spent three years on the road as Roger Miller's rhythm guitarist.

=== Early albums to 1980s ===
In 1972, Burnette signed with Entrance Records and recorded his debut album, Billy Burnette. In 1979, he switched to Polydor Records and released his second album, again titled Billy Burnette. His third album, Between Friends (Polydor, 1979), contained "What's a Little Love Between Friends", which charted briefly on the low end of the Billboard country chart. The album also had a cover version of "(Sittin' On) The Dock of the Bay" by Otis Redding.

After he signed with Columbia Records, he issued the third album to be called Billy Burnette (Columbia, 1980), his fourth album overall. The song "Don't Say No" reached No. 68 on the Billboard Hot 100. "Honey Hush" and "Tear It Up" were performed by his father and uncle. "One Night" was a cover of an Elvis Presley song. Videos were made for the tracks "Don't Say No" and "In Just a Heartbeat". The album Gimme You followed in 1981.

In 1985, Eddy Raven ("She's Gonna Win Your Heart") and Ray Charles ("Do I Ever Cross Your Mind") reached the charts with songs written by Burnette. Other artists who have sung his songs include Jerry Lee Lewis, the Everly Brothers, Gregg Allman, Loretta Lynn, Charlie Pride, Tanya Tucker, and Ringo Starr.

In 1986, Burnette released Soldier of Love. The title track peaked at No. 54 on the country charts and remained in the top 100 for seven weeks. He was nominated for Best New Male Vocalist by the Academy of Country Music. In 1987, he wrote "(All I Can Do Is) Dream You" for Roy Orbison. Curb released its final Billy Burnette album, Brother to Brother, a compilation with the title song added from the film Gleaming the Cube.

=== Solo career, 1990s–present ===
In 1992, Burnette signed with Capricorn Records, which issued Coming Home. Although "Nothing to Do (and All Night to Do It)" was not on the album, it reached No. 64 on the Billboard country chart. Many of the songs from Coming Home were featured in Burnette's acting debut in the film Saturday Night Special. Between 1994 and 1998, he appeared in the films Not Like Us, Carnosaur 3: Primal Species, Casper Meets Wendy, Addams Family Reunion, and Richie Rich's Christmas Wish.

In 1999, he signed with Grand Avenue Records and released All Night Long. Are You With Me Baby, a rockabilly album, followed on the Free Falls Entertainment label. The album had one cover, "Believe What You Say". Between 2001 and 2005, he covered "Copperhead Road" by Steve Earle and "Ring of Fire" by Johnny Cash. He toured as a member of Bob Dylan's backup band and in 2004 became a member of John Fogerty's band.

After a hiatus from solo albums, he released Memphis in Manhattan (2006), which was recorded live by Chesky Records at St. Peter's Church in New York City. The album included cover versions of "Everything Is Broken" by Bob Dylan, "Oh Well by Fleetwood Mac, "Big Hunk of Love" by Elvis Presley, "It's Late" and "Tear It Up" by Rick Nelson, and "Bye Bye Love" by The Everly Brothers.

In 2007, Burnett and Shawn Camp released a bluegrass tribute to Elvis Presley. The album featured thirteen songs previously recorded by Elvis, onto which Camp and Burnette added their vocals.

=== With Fleetwood Mac ===
Burnette met Mick Fleetwood during a taping of Dick Clark's anniversary special. A few months later, Fleetwood invited him to join the band The Zoo. For the Zoo's album I'm Not Me (RCA, 1983) Burnette sang lead vocals on "I'm Not Me"; "Angel Come Home", a Beach Boys song; "Gimme You", a cover of his own song; and "Tear It Up", written by his father.

In 1982, the Zoo performed on Saturday Night Live as the backing band for Lindsey Buckingham, guitarist and singer for Fleetwood Mac. In 1984, Burnette co-wrote the song "So Excited" with Christine McVie, who sang and played keyboards in Fleetwood Mac. The song appeared on McVie's solo album, and Burnette appeared with her on MTV for Christine McVie: The Video Album. He sang on the song "Are You Mine" with Stevie Nicks, another Fleetwood Mac vocalist. The song was intended for Nicks's album Rock a Little but was not included. McVie and Fleetwood performed on Burnette's album Try Me (Curb, 1985). Two songs cracked the Billboard country charts: "Try Me" and "Ain't It Just Like Love"

When Lindsey Buckingham and Fleetwood Mac parted ways in 1987, Burnette and guitarist Rick Vito were asked to join the band. After the Shake the Cage tour, Fleetwood Mac released a Greatest Hits album (1988), featuring two new songs with Burnette and Vito: "As Long as You Follow" and "No Questions Asked". For their next album, Behind the Mask, Burnette wrote "Hard Feelings" and "When It Comes to Love" and co-wrote "In the Back of My Mind", "Do You Know", and "When the Sun Goes Down".

Vito and Nicks left Fleetwood Mac at the end of 1991 and Christine McVie decided to retire from touring. Burnette helped Fleetwood Mac bassist John McVie with his first solo album. Burnette left Fleetwood Mac in early 1993 to pursue a solo and acting career. In 1994, Burnette reunited with Fleetwood Mac. The band featured two new members, vocalist Bekka Bramlett and guitarist Dave Mason. The band toured in 1994 and 1995, and then released the album Time (1995) on October 10, 1995. Burnette wrote "Talkin' to My Heart" and "I Got It in for You" with Deborah Allen. With Bramlett he wrote "Dreamin' the Dream".

After Fleetwood Mac went on hiatus in 1996, Burnette and Bramlett formed the country duo Bekka & Billy. They moved to Nashville and attracted the attention of producer Garth Fundis. They released the album Bekka and Billy in 1997 but they broke up in 1998.

== Discography ==
=== Albums ===
- Billy Burnette (Entrance, 1972)
- Billy Burnette (Polydor, 1979)
- Between Friends (Polydor, 1979)
- Billy Burnette (Columbia, 1980)
- Gimme You (Columbia, 1981)
- Try Me (Curb, 1985)
- Soldier of Love (Curb, 1986)
- Brother to Brother (Curb, 1988)
- Coming Home (Capricorn, 1993)
- Bekka & Billy (Almo, 1997) (with Bekka Bramlett)
- All Night Long (Grand Avenue, 1999)
- Are You With Me Baby (Free Falls, 2000)
- Memphis in Manhattan (Chesky, 2006)
- The Bluegrass Elvises, Volume 1 (American Roots, 2007) (with Shawn Camp)
- Rock & Roll With It (Rock & Roll With It, 2011)
- Crazy Like Me (Rock & Roll With It, 2017)

With Fleetwood Mac

- Greatest Hits (WEA/Warner Bros., 1988)
- Behind the Mask (WEA/Warner Bros, 1990)
- 25 Years – The Chain (Warner Bros., 1992)
- Time (WEA/Warner Brothers, 1995)
- The Very Best of Fleetwood Mac (Reprise, 2002)
- 50 Years – Don't Stop (Rhino, 2018)

Other contributions

- I'm Not Me, Mick Fleetwood's Zoo, (RCA, 1983)
- Just One of the Guys (Elektra, 1985)
- "Get an Education" from Summer School (Chrysalis, 1987)
- Homer and Eddie (Apache, 1989)
- John McVie's "Gotta Band" with Lola Thomas (Warner Bros., 1992)
- Bikers' Choice, Vol. 1, Steel Cowboys (Intersound, 1999)
- Dressed in Black: A Tribute to Johnny Cash (Dualtone, 2002)
- In the Meantime, Christine McVie (Koch, 2004)

=== Singles ===
Year	Single	Peak chart positions		Album
Year	Single	US Country	US	Album
1979	"What's a Little Love Between Friends"	76	—	Between Friends
1980	"Don't Say No"	—	68	Billy Burnette
1985	"Ain't It Just Like Love"	51	—	Try Me
1985	"Try Me"	68	—	Try Me
1986	"Soldier of Love"	54	—	Soldier of Love
1992	"Nothin' to Do (And All Night to Do It)"	64	—	—N/a
1993	"Tangled Up in Texas"	—	—	Coming Home
1993	"The Bigger the Love (The Harder the Fall)"	—	—	Coming Home
2023	"When the World Comes Back Around"	—	—	—N/a
"—" denotes releases that did not chart

== Music videos ==
- "Don't Say No" (1980)
- "In Just a Heartbeat" (1980)
- "As Long As You Follow" (with Fleetwood Mac) (1988)
- "In the Back of My Mind" (with Fleetwood Mac) (1990)
- "Save Me" (with Fleetwood Mac) (1990)
- "Skies the Limit" (with Fleetwood Mac) (1990)
- "Love Shines" (with Fleetwood Mac) (1992)
- "Nothin' to Do (And All Night to Do It)" (1992)
- "Tangled Up in Texas" (1993)
- "The Bigger the Love (The Harder the Fall)" (1993)
- "Better Days" (as Bekka and Billy) (1997)

== Filmography ==
- Fleetwood Mac – Tango in the Night (1987) as himself
- Saturday Night Special (1994) as Travis
- Not Like Us (1995) as Jody
- Carnosaur 3: Primal Species (1995) as Furguson
- Casper Meets Wendy (1998) as a chef
- Addams Family Reunion (1998) as a ballroom waiter
- Richie Rich's Christmas Wish (1998) as Nigel
- John Fogerty – The Long Road Home in Concert (2006) as himself
- John Fogerty – Live at the Royal Albert Hall (2008) as himself

== Awards and nominations ==
Year	Organization	Award	Nominee/Work	Result
1986	Academy of Country Music Awards	Top New Male Vocalist	Billy Burnette	Nominated
