= Time (Fleetwood Mac album) =

Studio album by Fleetwood Mac
- Released: 9 October 1995
- Recorded: 1993–1995
- Studios: Ocean Way (Hollywood); Sunset Sound (Hollywood)
- Genres: Pop rock; soft rock
- Length: 60:18
- Label: Warner Bros.
- Producers: Fleetwood Mac; Richard Dashut; John Jones; Ray Kennedy

Fleetwood Mac chronology
25 Years – The Chain (1992)	Time (1995)	The Dance (1997)

Singles from Time
- 1. "I Do" Released: 10 October 1995

Time is the sixteenth studio album by British-American rock band Fleetwood Mac, released on 9 October 1995. This album features a unique lineup for the band, including the addition of country vocalist Bekka Bramlett (daughter of Delaney and Bonnie) and former Traffic guitarist Dave Mason. It was the second album released after the departure of Lindsey Buckingham in 1987 (although he makes an appearance as a backing vocalist on one track), and the only Fleetwood Mac album since 1974's Heroes Are Hard to Find to not feature any contribution from Stevie Nicks. Additionally, it is the final Fleetwood Mac studio album to feature Christine McVie as an official member.

The album received unfavorable reviews from critics and was a commercial disappointment, failing to chart in the US and peaking at number 47 in the UK. According to Soundscan, the album sold 32,000 copies by 1996. Fleetwood Mac disbanded soon after the release of Time, although they reunited a few years later with Nicks and Buckingham for the release of The Dance.

== Background ==
Around the time of the 1990 Behind the Mask Tour, Stevie Nicks and Christine McVie announced that they would no longer partake in any further Fleetwood Mac tours, although both indicated that they would still work with the band on studio albums. However, Nicks decided in 1991 to leave the band entirely after Mick Fleetwood refused to let her include "Silver Springs" on her Timespace: The Best of Stevie Nicks compilation album. Rick Vito left around the same time and signed a solo recording deal with Nicks' Modern Records. Vito later commented that the band was "in flux" during the time of his departure due to their lack of commercial success. In early 1993, guitarist Billy Burnette departed to continue his solo career.

Later that year, Mick Fleetwood approached Bekka Bramlett to join Fleetwood Mac as a full member. Bramlett had previously collaborated with Fleetwood on his spinoff project The Zoo and appeared on the band's album Shakin' the Cage, which featured Billy Thorpe as its primary songwriter. Bramlett first encountered Fleetwood while seeing her father Delaney Bramlett perform in Laguna Beach, California. After seeing Bramlett perform with her father onstage, Fleetwood approached her about joining The Zoo with Thorpe. When looking for a replacement for Vito, Fleetwood was listening to audition tapes submitted by other guitarists at his cottage in Malibu, California. Frustrated with his inability to find a suitable guitarist, Fleetwood contacted Dave Mason and jokingly remarked that if his search continued to be unsuccessful, then Mason would have to join the band. Mason responded "Mick in all seriousness, I would love that".

== Production ==
The initial recording sessions began in September 1993, with intentions to complete the album in four months. However, a series of gigs and a tour with Crosby, Stills & Nash pushed the completion date further back than expected. Following the conclusion of their tour with Crosby, Stills & Nash, Fleetwood Mac returned to the studio and recorded a dozen songs in two weeks. By May 1995, the band had 19 songs to choose from, and intended to narrow the track list down to 12. However, a decision was made to add a thirteenth song, "These Strange Times", when Fleetwood expressed interest in recording one of his own compositions. With the exception of Bramlett, who fought for the song's inclusion on the record, the rest of the band was either unavailable or unwilling to play on it, so Fleetwood and Bramlett performed the song themselves with John Jones. A total of 25 songs were written and considered for Time, of which 13 were ultimately selected for inclusion.

Midway through the making of the album, Burnette was asked by Fleetwood to rejoin the band. Given his relatively late arrival, he only contributed three songs for the album. Several of the guitar parts on Christine McVie's five songs were played by session musician Michael Thompson. Billy Burnette commented that Thompson's parts were added to the existing guitar tracks played by himself and Mason. Mason provided a different account, saying that he never contributed to any of McVie's compositions. McVie said that her involvement with the album was a contractual obligation and "did not volunteer" to participate in the recording sessions.

Richard Dashut, who had produced several of Fleetwood Mac's previous albums, including Rumours, also handled some of the production duties on Time. Bramlett said that she did not initially recognise Dashut during these sessions, adding that it took a few run-throughs for her to identify him. During one of these sessions, Dashut had made a comment about Bramlett being more efficient in recording her parts than what he had experienced during the making of Rumours. Commenting on the matter, Bramlett said that "he probably shouldn’t have told me that. I was like, 'What? Oh no. Am I doing this too fast? Am I not caring enough?'".

Mason talked about his experience working on Time while the recording process was still occurring, saying that "I don’t want to say anything bad about this project, because it's an ongoing thing. To spend a year and a half in a studio, making a record, to me is absurd." McVie recalled in a 2017 interview with MOJO that she was both emotionally and physically absent during the recording sessions due to her poor working relationship with Mason.

"Dave Mason and I did not get along, and I thought the music was suffering...Emotionally not there, physically not here. I just didn’t show up...I couldn’t bear watching it all fall apart. And I couldn’t keep peace with Dave Mason, I’m afraid. It was very acrimonious with him and I just bailed."

Before the album's release, Fleetwood commented that Christine McVie was still "very much a part of this band". He added that she would likely take on a reduced role for their next album after Time by contributing "just a couple of songs" and eventually "phase herself out" of Fleetwood Mac.

== Songs ==
"Talkin' to My Heart" was written in Nashville by Burnette prior to his second stint with Fleetwood Mac. Burnette co-wrote the song with Rafe Van Hoy and Deborah Allen, who had previously worked with Burnette on his 1993 Coming Home album.

Another version of "Blow by Blow" had featured on the Gloryland World Cup USA 94 album for the 1994 World Cup the previous year. The five-piece lineup fronted by Billy Burnette, Mason and Bramlett performed it at the tournament's launch concert along with "Dreamin' the Dream", "The Chain" and "Oh Well".

"Nothing Without You" had originally been recorded by Delaney Bramlett, the father of Bekka, on his 1975 album Giving Birth to a Song, which had featured writing contributions from Billy Burnette. An additional verse written by Bekka ensured she got a writing credit on "Nothing Without You". Bramlett had performed the song live on a few occasions and altered some of the lyrics. Bramlett later told Rolling Stone that she felt that her songwriting credit was unearned based on her belief that her additions to the song were minimal. She called the decision to list her as a co-writer on the song a "business move" and said that writing credit was a "thorn in [her] side".

Bramlett co-wrote "Dreamin' the Dream" with Burnette soon after the two began a romantic relationship. Bramlett commented that Burnette wrote about "80% of the song", which she attributed to her attempts at "laying on the bed, trying to be sexy with [her] notepaper and pen instead of focusing on the song." Burnette recalled that Fleetwood, Mason, and John McVie were favorable on "Dreamin' the Dream" and that its inclusion was based on a protocol that any song submitted for the album had to receive unanimous support from the band. He said that "when you brought a new song in, everyone had to like it. It was something the band voted on."

The album also featured a rare lead vocal from drummer/band leader Mick Fleetwood on the seven-minute spoken piece "These Strange Times", produced by Duran Duran producer John Jones and written with Beach Boys co-writer Ray Kennedy. The spoken-word piece paid tribute to Peter Green and openly alluded to his songs "Man of the World" and "The Green Manalishi". The third verse also alluded to Stevie Nicks' "Dreams" and Lindsey Buckingham's "Walk a Thin Line".

== Live performances ==
With the exception of a New Year's Eve performance, the band did not tour following the album's release in October 1995, but had (without Christine McVie) toured from July to December 1994, and again from April to September 1995. Christine McVie explained that "touring was never my favorite thing to do" and cited insomnia and her inability to sleep in "strange beds night after night" as some of her reasons for opting not to tour. Mason believed that the lineup would have had more credibility if McVie accompanied them on the road.

Steve Thoma covered keyboards on the tour, which was titled the Another Link in the Chain Tour. In 1994, the band supported Crosby, Stills & Nash during their 25th anniversary tour. The following year, they performed on the same bill as Pat Benatar, REO Speedwagon, and Orleans. Jeremy Spencer, one of the band's original guitarists, joined the group on stage for their Tokyo performance. The only songs from Time to be performed at these shows were "Blow by Blow" and "Dreamin' the Dream". "All Over Again" received its first live performances on the An Evening with Fleetwood Mac tour in 2018 as a live duet between Christine McVie and Stevie Nicks, with Neil Finn playing keyboards. McVie said that the song was "about change, surviving change, and the future."

== Release ==
A few weeks after the release of Time, Fleetwood expressed his belief that Christine McVie contributed "some of the best songs of her career" and that the album encompassed a variety of styles due to the presence of four songwriters in the band. Christine McVie, who had already retired from live performances, notified the band that it would also be her last album appearance. Within a year, the line-up had split, with Mason, Bramlett and Burnette all leaving the band. Fleetwood informed Bramlett of her dismissal on a fax following an altercation on the band's tour bus.

In his memoir, Burnette said that around the release of Time, he learned that Warner Bros. Records were planning a Rumours lineup reunion for what later became The Dance album. When Burnette shared this information with Mason and Bramlett, both were initially skeptical of this rumoured development. He also mentioned that Bramlett's manager did not inform her that the Time lineup would be dissolved despite being privy to this knowledge. Soon before her dismissal, Bramlett had purchased a one million dollar house. She recalled that other members of Fleetwood Mac were aware of this purchase and had referred to her as "H.O." and "homeowner". Once she was fired from Fleetwood Mac, Bramlett was no longer able to keep the property. She also hinted at some gigs that were planned after the release of Time, which never materialised.

All of a sudden, Stevie was like, 'I'm better. I want to come back now.' What you have to understand is that Mick and I were the guys that did all the radio and promotion and TV stuff. We did all of it. I was definitely looking forward to the tour we had already just promoted. Evidently someone said, 'Get her out of here.'

— Bekka Bramlett

One year after Time was released, Fleetwood blamed the album's lack of commercial success on inadequate promotion from their record label, saying that "we worked hard on that record, and no one knew it existed." In his 2014 autobiography, Fleetwood expressed regret in assembling this lineup and stated that "this was the one time I should not have soldiered on". He explained that he should have known the "endeavor was flawed when it became clear that Dave Mason and Bekka Bramlett did not get along whatsoever...Bekka had no time for any kind of collective, connective, band-family stuff on the road at all, and like her mum, she did not mince words. Believe me, you don't want to have Bekka Bramlett unload on you, but that is what started happening to Mason regularly." Bramlett explained that she took umbrage with Mason for smoking cigars on the tour bus and sharing unsolicited secrets with her about his wife and girlfriends. She stated that their working relationship improved after a phone call with her father, who advised Bramlett to keep her temper in check when around Mason.

Bramlett and Burnette recorded the Bekka & Billy album together in 1997, the same year Lindsey Buckingham and Stevie Nicks rejoined Fleetwood Mac. Buckingham said in a 1997 interview that the lineup with Mason "actually didn't sound too bad on paper" but thought that this incarnation "bastardize[d]" the image of Fleetwood Mac.

== Critical reception ==
Professional ratings
Review scores
Source	Rating
AllMusic	2/5 stars
Encyclopedia of Popular Music	1/5 stars
Entertainment Weekly	C+

The album received negative reviews. AllMusic gave the album a two star review, considering it to be a drop in quality from their previous efforts. Billboard dismissed the work of all four songwriters and said that "even the legendary Christine McVie's contributions lack the fire of her past work."

Entertainment Weekly was slightly more positive, saying that "though hardly awful, Time is unimaginative and middle-of-the-road." It was voted number 10 in the All-Time Worst Albums Ever Made from Colin Larkin's All Time Top 1000 Albums. Mojo ranked Time last on its list ranking all of Fleetwood Mac's studio albums. They felt that the album yielded diminishing returns after the opening track and found Bramlett and Mason to be "gifted-but-ill-fitting" members of Fleetwood Mac.

== Track listing ==
Time track listing
No.	Title	Writer(s)	Lead vocals	Length
1.	"Talkin' to My Heart"	Billy Burnette, Deborah Allen, Rafe Van Hoy	Burnette/B. Bramlett	4:54
2.	"Hollywood (Some Other Kind of Town)"	Christine McVie, Eddy Quintela	C. McVie	5:45
3.	"Blow by Blow"	Dave Mason, John Cesario, Mark Holden	Mason	4:24
4.	"Winds of Change"	Kit Hain	B. Bramlett	4:26
5.	"I Do"	C. McVie, Quintela	C. McVie	4:28
6.	"Nothing Without You"	Delaney Bramlett, Doug Gilmore, Bekka Bramlett	B. Bramlett	3:06
7.	"Dreamin' the Dream"	B. Bramlett, Burnette	B. Bramlett	3:43
8.	"Sooner or Later"	C. McVie, Quintela	C. McVie	5:41
9.	"I Wonder Why"	Mason, Franke Previte, Tom Fuller	Mason/B. Bramlett	4:28
10.	"Nights in Estoril"	C. McVie, Quintela	C. McVie	4:47
11.	"I Got It in for You"	Burnette, Allen	Burnette	4:08
12.	"All Over Again"	C. McVie, Quintela	C. McVie	3:36
13.	"These Strange Times"	Mick Fleetwood, Ray Kennedy	Fleetwood (spoken word)	7:07

Japanese bonus track
No.	Title	Writer(s)	Lead vocals	Length
14.	"Little Lies" (extended version)	C. McVie, Quintela	C. McVie	6:07

== Personnel ==
Fleetwood Mac

- Bekka Bramlett – vocals
- Billy Burnette – guitars, vocals
- Dave Mason – guitars, vocals
- Christine McVie – keyboards, vocals
- John McVie – bass guitar
- Mick Fleetwood – drums, percussion, guitars and vocals (13)

Additional musicians

- Scott Pinkerton – synthesizer programming
- Steve Thoma – keyboards (3, 4, 9)
- John Jones – keyboards, guitars, bass (13)
- Michael Thompson – guitars (2, 5, 8, 10, 12)
- Fred Tackett – trumpet (8)
- Lindsey Buckingham – backing vocals (6)
- Lucy Fleetwood – backing vocals (13)

=== Production ===
- Fleetwood Mac – producers (1, 3, 4, 6, 7, 9, 11)
- Richard Dashut – producer (1, 2, 4–12)
- Christine McVie – producer (2, 5, 8, 10, 12)
- Dave Mason – producer (3)
- Billy Burnette – producer (7)
- John Jones – producer (13), recording (13), mixing (13)
- Ray Kennedy – producer (13)
- Ken Allardyce – recording (1–13), mixing (1–13)
- Charlie Brocco – additional engineer (1–12)
- Alan Sanderson – additional engineer (1–12), assistant engineer (1–12)
- Allen Sides – additional engineer (1–12)
- Jimmy Hotz – additional engineer (13)
- David Eike – assistant engineer (1–12)
- Richard Huredia – assistant engineer (1–12)
- Tom Nellen – assistant engineer (1–12)
- Dave Shiffman – assistant engineer (1–12)
- Stephen Marcussen – mastering
- Don Tyler – mastering assistant
- Scott Pinkerton – production assistant
- John Courage – production coordinator
- Mick Fleetwood – cover concept
- Gabrielle Raumberger – art direction
- Frank Chi – design
- Lance Staedler – band photography
- Dale McRaven – cover photography
- Bonnie Nelson – cover photography

Studios

- Recorded and Mixed at Ocean Way Recording (Hollywood, California).
- Additional recording at Sunset Sound Recorders (Hollywood, California).
- Mastered at Precision Mastering (Hollywood, California).

== Charts ==
Chart performance for Time
Chart (1995)	Peak position
Australian Albums (ARIA)	144
Dutch Albums (Album Top 100)	59
European Albums (Music & Media)	87
German Albums (Offizielle Top 100)	92
Scottish Albums (Official Charts)	76
UK Albums (Official Charts)	47
