= Rattlesnake Shake =

Single by Fleetwood Mac

from the album Then Play On
- B-side: "Coming Your Way"
- Released: September 1969 (US)
- Recorded: 15 May 1969
- Studio: De Lane Lea Studios
- Genre: Blues rock; psychedelic rock
- Length: 3:32
- Label: Reprise
- Songwriter: Peter Green
- Producer: Fleetwood Mac

"Rattlesnake Shake" is a song by British rock group Fleetwood Mac, written by guitarist Peter Green, which first appeared on the band's 1969 album Then Play On. It was the album's first single in certain markets, including the United States and The Netherlands, although it was not released in the band's home country of the United Kingdom, where "Oh Well" was released instead. Since its release, "Rattlesnake Shake" has been performed by Fleetwood Mac on several tours, and the song was one of the band's crowd-favorites in the late 1960s.

== Background ==
During a 1969 interview with Peter Green prior to the release of Then Play On, Nick Logan of New Musical Express described the song's subject matter as being "about a male function not mentioned in the best circles." Green said in a 1999 Q&A with The Penguin that "Rattlesnake Shake" was about masturbation and reckoned that the lyrical content was inspired by Fleetwood. Mick Fleetwood would later back up this claim in his 2014 autobiography Play On, stating that "Rattlesnake Shake" was an ode to masturbation. "I'm named in it, as a guy who does the rattlesnake shake to jerk away my sadness whenever I don't have a chick. That was an appropriate immortalisation of my younger self." In 2012, Fleetwood picked "Rattlesnake Shake" as one of his 11 greatest recordings.

The band recorded "Rattlesnake Shake" on 15 May 1969 at De Lane Lea Studios in London. Of the six takes that were recorded, three were completed and the final take was designated as the master. To achieve the rustling noises heard at the end of each chorus, the band used the sounds of an actual rattlesnake found on an audio tape. Green also used a Fender Bass VI to record the song's main riff. According to Fleetwood, the double-time shuffle near the end of the live version was a spontaneous decision. "It incorporated the freedom to go off on a tangent, to jam. You hear that alive and well in the double-time structure that I put in at the end, which on stage could last half an hour. It was our way of being in the Grateful Dead." Fleetwood Mac continued to perform the song live through the mid-1970s when Lindsey Buckingham and Stevie Nicks joined the band.

New Musical Express announced in its 23 August 1969 publication that "Rattlesnake Shake" would be released as a worldwide single with the exception of the United Kingdom. The publication said that Reprise Records would distribute the single, making it the band's first single on the label. "Rattlesnake Shake" was considered for release in the United Kingdom, although the band decided against it as they were opposed to the idea of promoting a single that was already included on Then Play On. As such, "Rattlesnake Shake" was bypassed as a British single in favour of "Oh Well", a non-album track. John Morthland of Rolling Stone said that the band's manager selected "Rattlesnake Shake" to be released in the US due to his belief that it would be a successful single. However, "Rattlesnake Shake" did not chart, and "Oh Well" was released as the follow-up single in January 1970, reaching No. 55 on the Billboard Hot 100.

== Critical reception ==
"Rattlesnake Shake" largely received positive reviews from music reviewers. Rolling Stone identified it as a "key track" of Green's along with "Albatross". Record World described the song as a "rock and roll bouncer" and Cashbox called it a "blistering blues/rock side from their Then Play On LP."

Writing for AllMusic, Michael G. Nastos characterised the song as "down-and-dirty, even-paced funk, with clean, wall-of-sound guitars." Ultimate Classic Rock placed it at No. 7 on their Top 10 'Peter Green Fleetwood Mac Songs' list. Holly Gleason of Paste ranked the song number No. 19 on their list of the 20 Best Fleetwood Mac Songs; it was one of two Peter Green songs to appear on the list along with "Oh Well".

== Track listing ==
- US Vinyl (Reprise 0860)
1. "Rattlesnake Shake"
2. "Coming Your Way"

== Personnel ==
Fleetwood Mac

- Peter Green – Fender Bass VI, vocals
- Danny Kirwan – electric guitar
- John McVie – bass guitar
- Mick Fleetwood – drums

== Chart performance ==
| Chart (1970) | Peak position |
|---|---|
| Netherlands (Dutch Top 40 Tipparade) | 4 |

== Cover versions ==
Mick Fleetwood later covered the song on his debut solo album, The Visitor. Released in 1981, this recording featured choral vocals and tribal percussion. Peter Green, the track's composer, also contributed guitar and vocals at a recording studio owned by Jimmy Page. During this time, Green had begun to reemerge professionally and released a series of solo albums up through the first half of the decade. Fleetwood's 1981 cover version reached No. 30 on the Mainstream Rock chart.

Also in 1981, Bob Welch recorded a live version of the track on his album Live at The Roxy, with contributions from Stevie Nicks (tambourine), Christine McVie (maracas), Mick Fleetwood (drums), Robbie Patton (cowbell), Alvin Taylor (guitar), Robin Sylvester (bass), Joey Brasler (guitar), and David Adelstein (keyboards). The album was released in 2004.

A 1973 live version of "Rattlesnake Shake" appeared on Aerosmith's 1991 box set Pandora's Box. Steven Tyler of Aerosmith recalled that he had seen one of Joe Perry's bands in the 1960s cover the song, which he partially attributed to their eventual musical partnership. In 2020, Tyler later performed the song live with Fleetwood for a Peter Green tribute concert. A recording from the show later appeared on the Celebrate the Music of Peter Green and the Early Years of Fleetwood Mac live album.

In 2005, former Fleetwood Mac guitarist Rick Vito covered "Rattlesnake Shake" on an album of the same name. The Mick Fleetwood Blues Band recorded a live version of "Rattlesnake Shake" for their album Blue Again! in 2008, which featured Vito on guitar and vocals.

In 2013, the Mick Fleetwood Blues Band played the song at a concert in Hawaii with Christine McVie, who at the time had not been a member of Fleetwood Mac for 15 years. McVie initiated the collaboration by calling Fleetwood, which prompted him and Vito to bring a piano to her hotel suite so she could practice the material. "Rattlesnake Shake" was one of the four songs McVie played with the Mick Fleetwood Blues Band, with the others being "Get Like You Used to Be", "World Turning" and "Don't Stop.

Personnel (Mick Fleetwood version)

- Peter Green – vocals, lead guitar
- Mick Fleetwood – drums, percussion
- Richard Dashut – percussion
- George Hawkins – bass guitar
- Todd Sharp – guitar
- Lord Tiki – hand drums
- Tony Todaro – percussion
- The Clapettes – percussion
- Ebaali Gbiko – percussion, backing vocals
