= I'm Not Me =

Studio album by Mick Fleetwood's Zoo
- Released: 24 June 1983
- Venue: Blue Whale
- Genres: Rock, blues rock
- Label: RCA Records
- Producers: Mick Fleetwood, Richard Dashut

Mick Fleetwood's Zoo chronology
The Visitor (1981)	I'm Not Me (1983)	Shakin' the Cage (1992)

Professional ratings
Review scores
Source	Rating
AllMusic	3.5/5 stars

I'm Not Me is the second solo album by Mick Fleetwood. This album is credited to the British-American rock band Mick Fleetwood's Zoo and features contributions from Fleetwood Mac members Christine McVie and Lindsey Buckingham. Billy Burnette, who performs some of the lead vocals on this album as a member of Mick Fleetwood's Zoo, would later join Fleetwood Mac in 1987 following the departure of Buckingham.

== Background ==
The impetus of Mick Fleetwood's Zoo began in 1982 when Buckingham was assembling a band to perform on Saturday Night Live. The band, which was at time was called The Cholos, featured Fleetwood, Burnette, George Hawkins, and Steve Ross. Burnette said that this lineup recorded some tracks, but was unsure if anything was done with them.

With Burnette and Fleetwood at the helm, The Cholos later morphed into Mick Fleetwood's Zoo, which performed a series of gigs before entering the recording studio. According to David Elliot Otlinsky, who served as Fleetwood's assistant in the early 1980s, a tentative album cover with the name "Mick Fleetwood and the Cholos" was created, although Fleetwood's lawyer advised him against using the word Cholo on the grounds that it would be derogatory towards Mexicans. Roughly 50 copies of the original album cover were made.

Fleetwood, who still had a record deal with Warner Brothers, purchased a mobile studio with the intention of recording a solo album in Brazil. However, this idea was scrapped and Fleetwood instead relocated to a facility known as Blue Whale to record a mixture of covers and new songs. The Blue Whale was a property in Ramirez Canyon Park that Fleetwood acquired soon before the recording of his first solo album, The Visitor in 1981. One song on the album was a cover of "Angel Come Home", originally by The Beach Boys. Christine McVie, who had previously been in a romantic relationship with Dennis Wilson of The Beach Boys, contributed to the song along with Lindsey Buckingham, who together with McVie were bandmates in Fleetwood Mac with Fleetwood. Of the erstwhile Fleetwood Mac lineup, only John McVie and Stevie Nicks did not participate in the making of the album.

George Hawkins, who performed most of the lead vocals on The Visitor, returned to sing some lead vocals on this album, although he was also working concurrently with vocalist Al Jarreau and thus had less involvement in the making of I'm Not Me compared to The Visitor. Instead, Fleetwood, Burnette, and Richard Dashut primarily handled the logistics of creating I'm Not Me. Fleetwood commented on his role fronting the band in an interview with Record magazine.

Although I don't write, I do have a fair amount to do with how the songs turn out. I think my strength is in being objective. When somebody asks me for an opinion of his song, I can give an opinion and have it accepted because I've got no axe of my own to grind.

— Mick Fleetwood

== Release ==
"I Want You Back" and "Angel Come Home" were released as singles and also received music videos. Reviewing "Angel Come Home", Cashbox believed that the single was akin to something "from a slightly altered Fleetwood Mac LP" and posited that it "could just be a sleeper on the pop charts and give the Mac member yet another solo success."

A tour followed the release of I'm Not Me, which comprised a series of performances in both bars and stadiums. During one of the Zoo's performances, Nicks joined the band onstage to play "Rhiannon". A few radio station heard in advance that she would be performing with the Zoo and leaked the information to the public. As such, three thousand people attended that show, although most of Fleetwood's shows attracted far fewer people. Fleetwood commented in his 2014 autobiography that "I didn't worry if no one showed up to the Zoo shows, because in my mind if I was playing, I had a purpose. My band, however, was embarrassed for me."

== Track listing ==
No.	Title	Writer(s)	Lead vocals	Length
1.	"Angel Come Home"	Carl Wilson, Geoffrey Cushing-Murray	Billy Burnette	4:18
2.	"You Might Need Somebody"	Tom Snow, Nan O'Byrne	Steve Ross	3:28
3.	"Tonight"	Annie McLoone	George Hawkins	3:59
4.	"I Want You Back"	Lindsey Buckingham, Ross	Buckingham, Ross	2:54
5.	"I'm Not Me"	Billy Burnette, Michael Smotherman	B. Burnette	3:42
6.	"State of the Art"	Hawkins	Hawkins	4:05
7.	"Tear It Up"	Johnny Burnette, Dorsey Burnette, Paul Burlison	B. Burnette	3:10
8.	"This Love"	Hawkins, Richard Dashut	Hawkins	4:18
9.	"I Give"	Ross	Ross	2:48
10.	"Just Because"	Lloyd Price	Ross	2:40
11.	"Put Me Right"	Hawkins	Hawkins	4:06

== Personnel ==
- Mick Fleetwood – drums, percussion
- Billy Burnette – guitar, vocals
- George Hawkins – bass guitar, keyboards, vocals
- Steve Ross – guitar, vocals

Additional personnel

- Lindsey Buckingham – guitar, keyboards, vocals
- Jon Clarke – saxophone
- Vince Denham – saxophone
- Don Roberts – tenor saxophone
- Christine McVie – keyboards, vocals
- Todd Sharp – guitar
- Ron Thompson – rhythm guitar, slide guitar
