= Something Big =

Something Big may refer to:

- Something Big (film), a 1971 American film
- "Something Big" (Adventure Time), a 2014 TV episode
- Something Big (Mary Mary album) or the title song, 2011
- Something Big (Mick Fleetwood Band album) or the title song, 2004
- "Something Big" (song), by Shawn Mendes, 2014
- "Something Big", a song by Tom Petty and the Heartbreakers from Hard Promises
- "Something Big", the title song from the 1971 film, composed by Burt Bacharach and Hal David, first recorded by Mark Lindsay
