= Temporary One =

1997 single by Fleetwood Mac

Single by Fleetwood Mac

from the album The Dance
- Released: September 1997
- Recorded: 23 May 1997
- Venue: Warner Bros. Studios (Burbank, California, US)
- Length: 4:00
- Label: Reprise
- Songwriters: Christine McVie; Eddy Quintela
- Producers: Lindsey Buckingham; Elliot Scheiner

Fleetwood Mac singles chronology
"I Do" (1995)	"Temporary One" (1997)	"Landslide (live)" (1998)

"Temporary One" is a Fleetwood Mac song written by Eddy Quintela and Christine McVie. It first appeared on their 1997 live album The Dance and was one of the four previously unreleased compositions included on the album.

== Background ==
McVie wrote "Temporary One" about moving back to England and completed the song prior to the conception of The Dance reunion. In May 1997, "Temporary One" was recorded on a Warner Bros. sound stage and filmed for an MTV special and a live album. Buckingham characterised "Temporary One" as a "uptempo song with a pop feel" when discussing the new material submitted for inclusion in the setlist for their sound stage performance. Fleetwood Mac also performed the song live following the release of The Dance.

In September 1997, "Temporary One" was serviced to radio stations in continental Europe and also issued as a retail single in certain countries. It was one of the most added songs to European radio playlists for the week dated 27 September 1997 according to Music & Media. "Temporary One" charted in Germany, where it peaked at No. 99 on the Media Control Charts and spent two weeks on the chart.

== Track listings ==
All songs were recorded live at Warner Bros. Studios in Burbank, California, in June 1997.

German CD single

1. "Temporary One" – 3:06
2. "Go Your Own Way" – 4:46
3. "Songbird" – 3:05
4. "Gypsy" – 4:12

Australian maxi-CD single

1. "Temporary One"
2. "Silver Springs"
3. "Songbird"
4. "Gypsy"

== Personnel ==
- Christine McVie – keyboards, lead vocals
- Lindsey Buckingham – guitar, backing vocals
- Stevie Nicks – backing vocals
- John McVie – bass guitar
- Mick Fleetwood – drums

Additional personnel

- Lenny Castro – tambourine
- Brett Tuggle – rhythm guitar
- Neale Heywood – acoustic guitar
- Sharon Celani – backing vocals
- Mindy Stein – backing vocals

== Charts ==
Chart (1997)	Peak position
Australia (ARIA)	130
Germany (GfK)	99
