= I Do (Fleetwood Mac song) =

Single by Fleetwood Mac

from the album Time
- Released: 10 October 1995
- Recorded: 1994
- Genre: Soft rock
- Length: 3:48
- Label: Warner Brothers
- Songwriters: Christine McVie; Eddy Quintela
- Producer: Richard Dashut

Fleetwood Mac singles chronology
"Paper Doll" (1992)	"I Do" (1995)	"Temporary One" (1997)

"I Do" is a song by British-American band Fleetwood Mac, from their 1995 album Time. The song was written by Christine McVie and Eddy Quintela, and produced by long-time Fleetwood Mac producer Richard Dashut. It was released as the first and only single from Time and peaked at number 62 in Canada. An edit of the song was included in the deluxe version of the band's 50 Years – Don't Stop compilation album.

== Release ==
The song was released as a single to support the album in October 1995. For the week dated 11 November 1995, "I Do" was ranked as the 25th most playlisted non-European song on European radio according to Music & Media. That same week, it also debuted at No. 6 on that publication's Major Market Airplay chart for the country of Poland, with a total of 17 reporting radio stations playing the song. By the week of 25 November 1995, "I Do" received a total of 33 appearances on European Hit Radio playlists, placing it just outside of that listing's top 40.

In Canada, "I Do" debuted at number 100 on the RPM 100 Hit Tracks chart during the week of 13 November 1995. Later that month, it also entered the Canadian Adult Contemporary charts. In January 1996, during its eighth week on the Canadian RPM 100 singles charts, "I Do" reached its peak position of No. 62.

== Critical reception ==
While its parent Time album was largely panned by music critics, "I Do" has been received positively by some publications. Ultimate Classic Rock singled out "I Do" as the one "great song" from Time and highlighted its "joy-filled chorus". Joe Tiller of Dig! described the song as "an effortless and evocative soft-rock gem". In his book Fleetwood Mac: The Complete Illustrated History, Richie Unterberger thought that "I Do" was the album's "clear winner" with its "buoyant piano-clear pop". Gavin Report favorably described it as a "hearty song [that is] glossy and melodic."

GQ labeled "I Do" as one of the ten best post-Rumours songs, writing that the song "sounds like something from the Mirage era; it certainly doesn't sound like a pop song produced in the 1990s. It's all jangly keys, shimmery guitars and soaring backing vocals. It's also, fittingly, one of the more positive song on this list, a vow to love someone in spite of their flaws."

== Track listing ==
=== CD Maxi (1995) ===
1. "I Do (Single Edit)" – 3:48
2. "Talkin' To My Heart" – 4:54
3. "Little Lies (Extended Version)" – 6:07
4. "Little Lies (Dub)" – 4:04

== Personnel ==
- Christine McVie – keyboards, lead vocals
- Billy Burnette – guitar, backing vocals
- John McVie – bass guitar
- Mick Fleetwood – drums, tambourine
- Bekka Bramlett – backing vocals
- Michael Thompson – guitar

== Charts ==
Chart (1995–1996)	Peak position
Canada Top Singles (RPM)	62
Canada Adult Contemporary (RPM)	50
US A/C (Gavin Report)	28
