= Total Drumming =

Recording by Mick Fleetwood
- Released: 2002
- Studio: Blue Moon
- Genres: Rock, loop

Mick Fleetwood chronology
| Shakin' the Cage (1992) | Total Drumming (2002) | Something Big (2004) |

Total Drumming is a collection of loops and samples by Mick Fleetwood. The release is a compendium of over 800 drum loops, intended for the purchaser to use for their own project Fleetwood is featured as the only performer on all of the samples and the loops are formatted as WAV files. The project was produced by Mike Scheibinger and Jonathon Todd, and was released by Sony Creative Software. A special limited edition of Total Drumming was also released that included a signed booklet from Fleetwood.

== Background ==
Before work started on this project, Fleetwood listened to some of his older material to determine what he would record in Blue Moon studio with Scheilbinger and Todd. It took three hours to unpack all of Fleetwood's gear, which included drum kits, wind chimes, talking drums, udus, timbales, a gong, and various hand percussion. The gong that Fleetwood played on this project was previous used on The Dance album in 1997; Todd had the instrument shipped to Blue Moon studio for the 2001 recording sessions.

Over the course of two days, Fleetwood spent over 30 hours in the recording studio tracking various grooves, one-shots, and "an assortment of percussive sound bites". The loops were recorded using the ACID recording software, which was developed by Sonic Foundry. The samples were recorded and released as WAV files. Several microphones were used to capture Fleetwood's instruments, including four Sennheiser MD421s on the tom drums, a Shure SM81 on the hi-hat, and an AKG C460 on the ride cymbal. Two ADK A51Ss served as stereo overhead microphones and two Milan VIP50s captured the ambiance of the room.

== Track listing ==
All songs written by Mick Fleetwood

1. Mysterious Echos
2. Straight Up
3. Dry Grooves and Fills
4. Grooves and Fills
5. Oneshots
6. Percussion
7. Vocal Bites

== Personnel ==
- Mick Fleetwood - vocals, drums, percussion, cowbell, toms
