= Celebrate the Music of Peter Green and the Early Years of Fleetwood Mac =

Mick Fleetwood & Friends Celebrate the Music of Peter Green and the Early Years of Fleetwood Mac

Live album by Various Artists
- Released: 30 April 2021
- Recorded: 25 February 2020
- Venue: London Palladium
- Genres: Blues, rock
- Label: BMG
- Producers: Austin Shaw, Glyn Johns

Various Artists chronology
Blue Again! (2008)	Mick Fleetwood & Friends Celebrate the Music of Peter Green and the Early Years of Fleetwood Mac (2021)

Professional ratings
Review scores
Source	Rating
AllMusic	3.5/5 stars

Mick Fleetwood & Friends Celebrate the Music of Peter Green and the Early Years of Fleetwood Mac is a live album by Mick Fleetwood and his seventh solo album overall. It was recorded during a February 2020 concert at the London Palladium to honour the music of founding Fleetwood Mac guitarist Peter Green, who died less than six months after the performance. The album charted in several countries upon its release, including the UK, Germany, Australia, and the Netherlands.

Rick Vito recalled that Fleetwood's core ensemble rehearsed the setlist over the course of two weeks in Maui. The band then reconvened in London with additional musicians. Vito commented that the band was eager to "pay homage to the early Fleetwood Mac and to Peter. They checked their egos at the door."

The concert featured various special guests, including Jeremy Spencer, one of the four original members of Fleetwood Mac. Billy Gibbons also joined the band onstage to play various songs including "Doctor Brown" and "The Green Manalishi (With the Two Prong Crown)", the latter of which also featured Kirk Hammett, who played Green's 1959 Gibson Les Paul. A video of the concert was broadcast on 24 April 2020 and the album followed six days later. Green did not perform or attend the tribute concert, although Fleetwood said that Green was aware of the event.

== Track listing ==
Albums details are taken primarily from the AllMusic album review and may differ from other sources.

Disc One: Act I
No.	Title	Writer(s)	Length
1.	"Rollin' Man"	Peter Green, Clifford Adams	4:13
2.	"Homework"	Otis Rush, Dave Clark, Al Perkins	4:04
3.	"Doctor Brown"	Buster Brown, J.T. Brown, Waymon Glasco	4:33
4.	"All Your Love"	Rush	4:35
5.	"Rattlesnake Shake"	Green	4:49
6.	"Stop Messin' Round"	Green, Adams	5:06
7.	"Looking for Somebody"	Green	4:37
8.	"Sandy Mary"	Green	5:37
9.	"Love That Burns"	Green, Adams	5:54
10.	"The World Keeps On Turning"	Green	3:16
11.	"Like Crying"	Danny Kirwan	2:38
12.	"No Place to Go"	Chester Burnett	4:00
13.	"Station Man"	Kirwan, Jeremy Spencer, John McVie	6:29

Disc Two: Act II
No.	Title	Writer(s)	Length
1.	"Man of the World"	Green	3:34
2.	"Oh Well, Pt. 1"	Green	4:21
3.	"Oh Well, Pt. 2"	Green	6:02
4.	"Need Your Love So Bad"	Little Willie John, Mertis John Jr.	5:59
5.	"Black Magic Woman"	Green	7:14
6.	"The Sky Is Crying"	Elmore James	6:37
7.	"I Can't Hold Out"	Willie Dixon, James	5:03
8.	"The Green Manalishi (With the Two Prong Crown)"	Green	5:58
9.	"Albatross"	Green	3:36
10.	"Shake Your Moneymaker"	James	7:08

== Personnel ==
House band

- Mick Fleetwood – MC, drums, percussion
- Rick Vito – guitar, vocals
- Jonny Lang – guitar, vocals
- Andy Fairweather Low – guitar, vocals
- Ricky Peterson – keyboards, vocals, musical director
- Dave Bronze – bass guitar
- Zak Starkey – drums, percussion

Additional personnel

- Billy Gibbons – guitar, vocals
- John Mayall – keyboards, harmonica, vocals
- Steven Tyler – harmonica, percussion, vocals
- Christine McVie – keyboards, vocals
- Noel Gallagher – acoustic guitar, vocals
- Pete Townshend – guitar, vocals
- Neil Finn – guitar, vocals
- David Gilmour – guitar, pedal steel guitar
- Jeremy Spencer – guitar, vocals
- Bill Wyman – bass guitar
- Kirk Hammett – guitar

== Charts ==
Chart (2021)	Peak position
Australian Albums (ARIA)	35
Austrian Albums (Ö3 Austria)	13
Belgian Albums (Ultratop Flanders)	21
Belgian Albums (Ultratop Wallonia)	58
Dutch Albums (Album Top 100)	23
French Albums (SNEP)	135
German Albums (Offizielle Top 100)	12
Italian Albums (FIMI)	80
Spanish Albums (Promusicae)	48
Swedish Albums (Sverigetopplistan)	41
Swiss Albums (Schweizer Hitparade)	13
UK Albums (Official Charts)	3
