= King of Hearts (Rick Vito album) =

King Of Hearts

Studio album by Rick Vito
- Released: May 25, 1992
- Genre: Rock
- Length: 42:49
- Label: Modern
- Producers: Terry Manning; Rick Vito; Lance Quinn

Rick Vito chronology
King Of Hearts (1992)	Pink & Black (1998)

Professional ratings
Review scores
Source	Rating
AllMusic	3/5 stars

King of Hearts is the first solo album by former Fleetwood Mac guitarist and singer Rick Vito, released in 1992. Certain songs on King of Hearts, including "Walk Another Mile" and "Intuition" were rehearsed for Fleetwood Mac's Behind the Mask album, but the band ultimately decided not to use them.

== Track listing ==
All songs written by Rick Vito

1. "Walk Another Mile" – 3:53
2. "I’ll Never Leave This Love Alive" – 4:26
3. "Desireé" – 3:47
4. "Honey Love" – 4:31
5. "I Still Have My Guitar" – 4:38
6. "Poor Souls In Love" – 4:13
7. "Knock Me Down" – 4:35
8. "Walking With The Deco Man" – 4:12
9. "Intuition" – 4:17
10. "Two Hearts On Fire" – 4:13

== Personnel ==
- Rick Vito – guitars, vocals (all tracks), bass guitar (2, 4, 5, 7–10)
- Stevie Nicks – vocals (3, 9)
- Rick Prince – bass guitar (1)
- Jerry Lee Domino – organ (1–3), keyboards (5, 8)
- Charles "Mojo" Johnson – drums (1–9)
- Gary Mallaber – drums (10), backing vocals (1)
- Tony Reyes – backing vocals (1, 6)
- Scott Smith – bass guitar (3)
- Andy Kravitz – percussion (3, 4)
- Donny Gerrard – backing vocals (3, 10)
- Dexter Dickinson – backing vocals (3, 10)
- Jimmy Jameson – backing vocals (4, 7)
- Lance Quinn – keyboards (6)
- Scott "Omni" Adams – keyboards (7)
- Obie O'Brien – maracas (7)

== Production ==
- Producers: Terry Manning & Rick Vito, Lance Quinn
- Engineer: Gary Mallaber, Terry Manning, Chris Brocius & Craig Fall
- Assistant Engineers: Obie O’Brien
- Mixing: Lance Quinn, Obie O’Brien, Brian Malouf, Phil "The Baker" Nicolo, Steve Pouliot
- Mastering: Bernie Grundman
- Programming: Steve Croes, Dan Garfield
- Art Direction: Kosh Brooks Design
- Design: Junker/Stephanie Sydney
- Photography: Jeff Katz
