= These Strange Times =

Song by Fleetwood Mac

from the album Time
- Released: 10 October 1995
- Recorded: 1995
- Studio: Ocean Way Recording
- Length: 7:07
- Label: Reprise
- Songwriter(s): Mick Fleetwood; Ray Kennedy
- Producer(s): Mick Fleetwood; Ray Kennedy; John Jones

"These Strange Times" is a song by the British rock group Fleetwood Mac that appeared on their 1995 Time album. It is one of the few songs in Fleetwood Mac's discography to feature Mick Fleetwood on vocals, who performed the song through spoken word. He co-wrote the song with Ray Kennedy, who also co-produced the song with Fleetwood and John Jones. With the exception of Bekka Bramlett, who sang backing vocals on "These Strange Times", Fleetwood was the only other remaining member of the band to contribute in any capacity to the song. In addition to his usual instrumental contributions of drums and percussion, Fleetwood also recorded some guitar on "These Strange Times". Jones provided the remaining instrumentation and Fleetwood's daughter Lucy recorded some additional vocals.

Lyrically, Fleetwood primarily wrote the song as a tribute to Peter Green, who co-founded Fleetwood Mac with Fleetwood. Some of Green's compositions are referenced in the lyrics, including "Man of the World" and "The Green Manalishi (With the Two Prong Crown)". Fleetwood has also said that the song related to his tribulations with drug dependency and his achievement of sobriety. In 2020, Fleetwood re-recorded the song with Bramlett and Rick Vito, a former member of Fleetwood Mac. This version was released under the band "Mick Fleetwood's Da da ism".

== Background ==
"These Strange Times" was a late addition to Fleetwood Mac's Time album, which was released in 1995. Work on that album began two years prior in September with the lineup of Fleetwood, John McVie, Christine McVie, Billy Burnette, Bekka Bramlett, and Dave Mason. After the conclusion of their summer 1994 tour, where they shared the bill with Crosby, Stills & Nash, the band recorded twelve songs over the span of two weeks and had accumulated a total of 19 songs by spring 1995.

The band planned on releasing Time with twelve songs, but a decision was made to add "These Strange Times" as the thirteenth song on Time at the insistence of Fleetwood, who wrote the song as a tribute to his former bandmate Peter Green, a co-founder of Fleetwood Mac. Fleetwood was disappointed that most of the band's discography was devoid of his compositions and thus pushed for the inclusion of "These Strange Times" on the Time album. Certain members, including Christine McVie, refused to contribute the track's development; Burnette was in Switzerland at the time and was thus unable to participate. Bramlett "fought for" the song to be recorded and was the only member of Fleetwood Mac other than Fleetwood to appear on the song. John Jones was hired to produce the song and provided various instrumentation, including guitars, bass, and keyboards. Fleetwood's daughter Lucy also contributed the whispered "daddy" vocals.

Musically, the song is built around the sounds of a cello and what the British music journalist Mark Blake described as "doomy percussion". Fleetwood played some of the percussion on various drums he had acquired from Ghana. The song lacks conventional lead vocals through singing; the song's lyrics are instead provided by Fleetwood through spoken word. Fleetwood wrote the song as a dedication to Green and an acknowledgment of his own personal struggles. In the song, Fleetwood refers to Green as "a man of the world", which references Green's song "Man of the World". The line "I too, my friend, find the devil trying to make me do things I don't want to do" was adapted from "The Green Manalishi (With the Two Prong Crown)", another composition written by Green. As the song progresses, the lyric "god is nowhere" changes to "god is now here". Fleetwood said that the lyrics were not meant to "indoctrinate" or "beat people over the head" and were neither religious nor political. He commented that the song amounted to a "train of thought" and was about investigating personal perspectives. He also characterised the song as "philosophical, anecdotal thing I just had to get off my chest" and said that some of the lyrics also pertained to his dependency on recreational drugs and his recovery from addiction.

The subject matter is inspired by Peter Green, but it's also about me. I nearly destroyed myself with drugs and alcohol and crazy behavior, and this is a positive thought mode that you can get out of the dark, into the light. I was a functioning addict for a long time. It wasn't as bad as it sounds, because as long as I had my stuff, I functioned perfectly normally and looked just like anybody else, but I was dependent on drugs to maintain that state. So this song is about getting out of that mire.

— Mick Fleetwood

== Personnel ==
- Mick Fleetwood – drums, percussion, guitar, and vocals
- Lucy Fleetwood – backing vocals
- Bekka Bramlett – backing vocals
- John Jones – guitar, bass, keyboards

== Mick Fleetwood's Da da ism version ==
In 2020, Fleetwood re-recorded the song under the name Mick Fleetwood's Da da ism. Bramlett had encouraged Fleetwood to rework the song and helped Fleetwood craft a new version at his home studio in Maui. Fleetwood found the prospect of redoing an old composition an appealing proposition. For the re-recording, Fleetwood wanted to place particular attention on introducing new elements to the song, which he accomplished by reconfiguring the drums and incorporating Bramlett's vocals to a greater extent than the original version. On the re-recording, Bramlett said that she recorded backing vocals in twelve different languages. Fleetwood felt that the song's inclusion on a commercially unsuccessful album (Time) gave him more leeway to reimagine "These Strange Times", which he believed would have been more difficult to accomplish if the song was more well known and "untouchable".

The last thirty seconds of the song feature a snippet of the Fleetwood Mac instrumental "Albatross", which was composed by Peter Green. Rick Vito, who along with Bramlett was also a former member of Fleetwood Mac, re-recorded "Albatross" with Fleetwood for the reworking of "These Strange Times". In a 2020 interview, Fleetwood expressed his belief that the original recording was "not released at the right time" and thought that some of the contemporary events that year rendered the re-recording comparatively more topical. Fleetwood originally thought that the re-recording would remain as a personal endeavor without a widespread release; he later reassessed his decision after playing the song for people to receive feedback. He then contemplated the idea of giving the song a commercial release and later heard from Rhino Records that they were interested in accompanying the track with visuals for a music video.

A music video, which encompassed themes related to the COVID-19 pandemic, racial inequality, poverty, and pollution, was ultimately created to coincide with the release of the song. The single artwork was inspired by a nineteenth century painting. Fleetwood commented that when he "first encountered the painting that inspired the photoshoot, it was a soul-searching exercise that I was driven to do but I didn't know when would be the time to release it, now I know why: the when is now."

== Critical reception ==
Howard Cohen of the Miami Herald called "These Strange Times" "the most ambitious track Fleetwood Mac has attempted in ages" and said that it "brought the often-wonderful Time to a stunning close." In a retrospective review, Entertainment Weekly labelled "These Strange Times" as the nadir of Time and described it as a song that "finds Mick Fleetwood solemnly pronouncing that 'God is now here, God is now here' over new agey synth." Mark Blake wrote that the song had a "compelling car-crash quality. It's the sound of a rock star unravelling in public."
