= Like a Rock (song) =

Single by Bob Seger & the Silver Bullet Band

from the album Like a Rock
- B-side: "Livin' Inside My Heart"; "Katmandu" (live version)
- Released: May 1986
- Recorded: 1985
- Genre: Heartland rock, country rock
- Length: 4:36 (DJ 45 version); 5:56 (single and album version)
- Label: Capitol
- Songwriter: Bob Seger
- Producers: Punch Andrews, David N. Cole, Bob Seger

Bob Seger & the Silver Bullet Band singles chronology
"American Storm" (1986)	"Like a Rock" (1986)	"It's You" (1986)

Music video
- "Like a Rock" on YouTube

"Like a Rock" is a song written by American singer-songwriter Bob Seger. The single peaked at No. 1 on the US Album Rock Tracks chart.

== Background and writing ==
Seger told the New York Times that the song "was inspired partly by the end of a relationship that had lasted for 11 years. You wonder where all that time went. But beyond that, it expresses my feeling that the best years of your life are in your late teens when you have no special commitments and no career. It's your last blast of fun before heading into the cruel world."

== Reception ==
Cash Box called it an "emotional ballad of perseverance and commitment." Billboard called it a "slow-paced, rough-edged ballad [that] mourns the certainties of youth."

Classic Rock History critic Janey Roberts rated it as Seger's 10th best song.

== Personnel ==
Credits are adapted from the liner notes of Like a Rock.

- Bob Seger – lead vocals

The Silver Bullet Band

- Chris Campbell – bass
- Craig Frost – organ

Additional musicians

- Dawayne Bailey – acoustic guitar
- Douglas Kibble – background vocals
- Russ Kunkel – drums
- Bill Payne – piano
- Rick Vito – slide guitar
- The Weather Girls (Izora Armstead and Martha Wash) – background vocals

== Chart performance ==
Chart (1986)	Peak position
Canadian RPM Top Singles	33
Canadian RPM Adult Contemporary Tracks	5
US Billboard Hot 100	12
US Billboard Adult Contemporary	21
US Billboard Album Rock Tracks	1

Chart (2025)	Peak position
Jamaica Airplay (JAMMS)	3

Chart (2026)	Peak position
Jamaica Airplay (JAMMS)	2

== In media ==
This song's greatest exposure was in Chevrolet truck television advertisements from 1991 until 2004, for their massively successful "Like a Rock" campaign. Chevrolet originally wanted to use Bruce Springsteen's "Born in the U.S.A." for the ad campaign but "Like a Rock" was chosen when Springsteen declined.

== "Livin' Inside My Heart" ==
The B-side of some versions of the "Like a Rock" single was "Livin' Inside My Heart". Seger said of the song:

I wanted so bad to put "Living Inside My Heart" on my Greatest Hits, Volume 2 record and I fought and fought and fought. My manager said: “No, that’s a movie song.” I said: “No, I want it on there.” It’s beautiful. I was so bummed when they wouldn’t let me put it on there. I was actually working on my new album and let that one slide, and I wished I had worked harder on that Greatest Hits, Volume 2 package because there were other songs that I really wanted on there.

== See also ==
- List of number-one mainstream rock hits (United States)
