= Like a Rock =

Studio album by Bob Seger & The Silver Bullet Band
- Released: March 27, 1986
- Studios: Capitol (Hollywood); Criteria (Miami)
- Genre: Rock
- Length: 43:55
- Label: Capitol
- Producers: Punch Andrews, David N. Cole, Bob Seger

Bob Seger & The Silver Bullet Band chronology
The Distance (1982)	Like a Rock (1986)	The Fire Inside (1991)

Singles from Like a Rock
- 1. "American Storm" Released: March 1986; 2. "Like a Rock" Released: May 1986; 3. "It's You" Released: August 1986; 4. "Miami" Released: November 1986

Professional ratings
Review scores
Source	Rating
AllMusic	3/5 stars

Like a Rock is the thirteenth studio album by American singer-songwriter Bob Seger, released in 1986. The title track is best known for being featured in Chevrolet truck commercials throughout the 1990s and early 2000s.

== Content ==
"Fortunate Son" is a live cover of the 1969 Creedence Clearwater Revival hit, recorded March 31, 1983 at Cobo Hall in Detroit. It was originally available only as the B-side of the "American Storm" single, and was added as a bonus track to the CD release of the album. The vinyl version ends with "Somewhere Tonight". The song "Miami" is featured in an episode of the TV series Miami Vice.

Seger said of "The Ring":

I’ll tell you a song that Don Henley really likes of mine and nobody ever played it on the radio. When I played it for him it knocked him out. It’s a song called "The Ring." I think it’s on my album Like A Rock. It’s a six- minute ballad and it deals with a specific subject matter about a failing marriage out in a rural area and the restlessness that is setting in. The marriage has gone to pot and the ring doesn’t mean anything any more and they’re trying to hold it together. The characters are very sharply drawn. Nobody ever played it on the radio but I love it.

Cash Box said of "It's You" that "This mid-tempo ballad has a mellow country inflection with the customary Seger rock edge." Billboard called it a "subdued mid-tempo song" that "fairly begs for a country cover."

Cash Box called "Miami" a "more relaxed, meldodic outing." Billboard called it a "wistful boogie that contemplates the immigrant's dilemma."

This is the first studio album credited to "Bob Seger & the Silver Bullet Band" that does not feature the Muscle Shoals Rhythm Section replacing the Silver Bullet Band on any tracks.

== History ==
The album was originally going to be named American Storm after the first track and was going to be released in December 1985, but it was delayed and the name was changed.

== Track listing ==
All tracks are written by Bob Seger, except where noted.

No.	Title	Writer(s)	Length
1.	"American Storm"		4:17
2.	"Like a Rock"		5:56
3.	"Miami"		4:40
4.	"The Ring"		5:35
5.	"Tightrope"	Craig Frost, Seger	4:31
6.	"The Aftermath"	Frost, Seger	3:30
7.	"Sometimes"		3:31
8.	"It's You"		4:03
9.	"Somewhere Tonight"		4:25
10.	"Fortunate Son"	John Fogerty	3:20

Deluxe Edition bonus tracks
No.	Title	Writer(s)	Length
11.	"Shakedown"	Seger, Harold Faltermeyer, Keith Forsey	4:03
12.	"Blue Monday"	Dave Bartholomew	2:23

== Personnel ==
As listed in the liner notes.

- Bob Seger – guitar (1), piano (3), acoustic guitar (4), vocals (1–10)

=== Silver Bullet Band ===
- Craig Frost – organ (1–4, 7), piano (4, 10), synthesizer (5, 6, 8, 9)
- Chris Campbell – bass (1–10)
- Alto Reed – baritone saxophone (1, 7), tenor saxophone (3, 6), organ (10)

=== Additional musicians ===
Guitars

- Pete Carr – guitar (1)
- Dawayne Bailey – acoustic guitar (2), electric guitar (10)
- Rick Vito – slide guitar (2, 5, 6), acoustic guitar (3, 4)
- Fred Tackett – acoustic guitar (4, 9), guitar solo (7)
- Dann Huff – guitar (7)
- Mark Chatfield – electric guitar (10)

Drums and percussion

- Russ Kunkel – drums (1, 2)
- John Robinson – drums (3, 5–9)
- Gary Mallaber – drums (4)
- Don Brewer – drums (10)
- Paulinho da Costa – percussion (3, 6, 8)

Keyboards

- Bill Payne – piano (1, 2, 6–9), piano solo (8), synthesizer (3, 4, 8)
- David Cole – synthesizer solo (8)

Horns

- Gary Grant – trumpet (3)
- Gary Herbig – saxophone (3)
- Jerry Hey – trumpet (3, 6, 7)
- Kim Hutchcroft – saxophone (3, 7)
- Bill Reichenbach Jr. – trombone (3, 6, 7)
- Marc Russo – saxophone (3, 6, 7)
- Ernie Watts – saxophone (3, 6, 7)

Additional vocals

- Douglas Kibble – background vocals (2)
- The Weather Girls (Izora Armstead and Martha Wash) – background vocals (2, 5, 6)
- Don Henley – background vocals (3)
- Timothy B. Schmit – background vocals (3)
- Laura Creamer – background vocals (5, 6, 8, 9)
- Mark Creamer – background vocals (5, 6, 8, 9)
- Donny Gerrard – background vocals (5, 6, 8, 9)
- Shaun Murphy – vocals (5), background vocals (6, 9), harmony vocals (7, 8)

== Production ==
- Producers: Punch Andrews, David N. Cole, Bob Seger
- Engineers: David N. Cole, Greg Edward, Shelly Yakus
- Assistant engineers: David Axelbaum, Bob Castle, Judy Clapp, Peter Doell, Steve Himelfarb
- Mixing: Punch Andrews, David N. Cole, Bob Seger
- Mastering: Wally Traugott
- Horn arrangements: Jerry Hey, Alto Reed
- Art direction: Bill Burks, Roy Kohara
- Design: Mark Shoolery
- Photography: Aaron Rapoport

== Charts ==
=== Weekly charts ===
Chart (1986)	Peak position
Australian Albums (Kent Music Report)	24
Austrian Albums (Ö3 Austria)	30
Canada Top Albums/CDs (RPM)	5
Dutch Albums (Album Top 100)	38
German Albums (Offizielle Top 100)	53
Norwegian Albums (VG-lista)	4
Swedish Albums (Sverigetopplistan)	12
Swiss Albums (Schweizer Hitparade)	17
UK Albums (Official Charts)	35
US Billboard 200	3

=== Year-end charts ===
Chart (1986)	Position
Canada Top Albums/CDs (RPM)	17
US Billboard 200	22

Singles

Year	Song title	Billboard chart	Peak
1986	"American Storm"	Mainstream Rock Tracks	2
1986	"American Storm"	Hot 100	13
1986	"Fortunate Son"	Mainstream Rock Tracks	9
1986	"It's You"	Adult Contemporary	22
1986	"It's You"	Mainstream Rock Tracks	8
1986	"It's You"	Hot 100	52
1986	"Like a Rock"	Adult Contemporary	21
1986	"Like a Rock"	Mainstream Rock Tracks	1
1986	"Like a Rock"	Hot 100	12
1986	"Miami"	Hot 100	70
1986	"Tightrope"	Mainstream Rock Tracks	35
1986	"The Aftermath"	Mainstream Rock Tracks	9
