= American Storm =

Single by Bob Seger & the Silver Bullet Band

from the album Like a Rock
- B-side: "Fortunate Son"
- Released: March 1986
- Recorded: 1985–1986
- Genre: Heartland rock, country rock
- Length: 4:17 (album version); 4:34 (12" full length version)
- Label: Capitol
- Songwriter: Bob Seger
- Producers: Punch Andrews, David N. Cole, Bob Seger

Bob Seger & the Silver Bullet Band singles chronology
"Understanding" (1984)	"American Storm" (1986)	"Like a Rock" (1986)

"American Storm" is a song written by American singer-songwriter Bob Seger. It was recorded with The Silver Bullet Band and released in March 1986 as the lead single from their album Like a Rock. The single peaked at number 13 on the U.S. Billboard Hot 100 chart and at number 2 on the US Billboard Mainstream Rock Tracks chart.

== Background and writing ==
In 1986, Seger told The New York Times that the song is about cocaine abuse. "I wrote it after reading 'Wired,' Bob Woodward's biography of John Belushi. That was two and a half years ago, when there was a lot of publicity about cocaine abuse in show business. At the time, I thought that it was just a trend that would quickly die out and that the song would be out of date when it came time to record. But the situation has gotten worse. Maybe cocaine isn't quite as fashionable on the East and West Coasts these days, but the plague has spread into the heartland – into the Middle West and the South. The key line in 'American Storm' is 'You never feel the need.' You never feel anything when you're on drugs. You're numb. You're afraid to feel for one reason or another, and that's why you turn to drugs. I want to see people not do that."

"American Storm" is in the key of E major. Music critic Maury Dean explains that the song builds tension in the verses by playing rhythm guitar chords on the backbeat and by playing more softly in the 1st verse to enhance the power of the refrain. The chorus generally uses the chord pattern of E, C#m, A and B7, but during the fade-out he changes the pattern to a chromatic C, D, E which produces what Dean describes as an "incredible" effect.

== Reception ==
Maury Dean praised the song effusively, calling it "one of the Top 38 Rock and Roll Songs of All Time." Dean praised Seger's "vocal power" as being comparable to the likes of Bruce Springsteen, Roy Orbison, Paul McCartney and Elvis Presley.

Cash Box said that "the blistering rhythm track supports a solid, anthemic rock and roll song." Billboard called it an "uptempo stomper with a serious mien, in [Seger's] best rock 'n' roll style."

== Music video ==
The music video featured Lesley Ann Warren, James Woods, Randy Quaid and Scott Glenn. It is designed to resemble soundtrack videos where scenes from the movie are intercut with the artist performing the featured song except in this instance, there was no originating movie. The fake film portion of the video was directed by Brian DePalma, known for his features Carrie, The Untouchables and Mission: Impossible. The performance section was directed by Jim Yukich.

In June 2026, the band released a new version of the video on their official YouTube channel. This version is strictly a performance video with no fake film elements.

== Personnel ==
Credits are adapted from the liner notes of Like a Rock.

- Bob Seger – lead vocals, guitar

The Silver Bullet Band

- Chris Campbell – bass
- Craig Frost – organ
- Alto Reed – baritone saxophone

Additional musicians

- Pete Carr – guitar
- Russ Kunkel – drums
- Bill Payne – piano

== Chart performance ==
Chart (1986)	Peak position
Canadian RPM Top Singles	26
UK Singles Chart	78
US Billboard Hot 100	13
US Billboard Mainstream Rock Tracks	2
