= Walk a Thin Line =

Song by Fleetwood Mac

from the album Tusk
- A-side: "Sisters of the Moon"
- Released: 1979
- Recorded: 1978–1979
- Genre: Soft rock
- Length: 3:46
- Label: Warner Bros.
- Songwriter: Lindsey Buckingham
- Producers: Fleetwood Mac, Richard Dashut, Ken Caillat

"Walk a Thin Line" is a song by British-American rock band Fleetwood Mac, released in 1979. Composed and sung by guitarist Lindsey Buckingham, it was one of his nine songs that appeared on the Tusk album. The song was issued as the B-side to "Sisters of the Moon", which was the fourth single from Tusk in North America.

== Background ==
Progress on "Walk a Thin Line" began in October 1978 under the working title "Lindsey's Song #3" at Buckingham's home studio, although much of the work was conducted in April 1979, when the song was rebuilt from scratch in Studio D at The Village Recorder. The song was constructed around found sounds in the studio, including a double-tracked toy piano. (Note: In 1978, Buckingham recommended the use of toy pianos on Bob Welch's re-recording of "Sentimental Lady" and Walter Egan's "Magnet and Steel", both of which Buckingham worked on.) However, the toy pianos were soon replaced with a baby grand piano, which Buckingham played at half-speed with one finger. The piano track was then sped up to create a "jangly" quality to the instrument during the song's chorus.

"Walk a Thin Line" was inspired by a Charlie Watts drum fill on "Sway", from the Rolling Stones album Sticky Fingers. This drum fill caught Buckingham's interest, and he intended to feature the part on one of his Tusk songs. The "military press-rolls" were multi-tracked and played by Buckingham rather than Fleetwood Mac drummer Mick Fleetwood. "Mick was appalled. He was appalled that these drums were going out and people would think that it’s him because it offended the finer points of his sensibilities. And I understand that." Buckingham later replaced the hi-hat part with two acoustic Ovation guitars played at different octaves.

Producer Ken Caillat said that "it was remarkable how loose all the parts were. The low chunks that Lindsey played on his Gretsch were doubled, but they weren't played in time with each other, something very uncharacteristic from his earlier work where everything would be laid down perfectly." Buckingham also recorded some backing vocals in a push-up position and sang into a microphone taped to the floor for a more "aggressive" vocal timbre.

== Critical reception ==
Ed Harrison of Billboard labelled "Walk a Thin Line" as Buckingham's "most moving ballad" on Tusk and highlighted the song's vocal harmonies. Writing for The Michigan Daily, Dennis Harvey criticized the song for its "sluggish" pacing and "banal" lyrics. Stephen Holden Rolling Stone was more positive in his assessment and singled out "Walk a Thin Line" as one of Buckingham's more commercial tracks on Tusk. While Mitch Cohen of Creem magazine dismissed most of Buckingham's compositions on Tusk as "Barthelme-dull sketches buried in thump and clangor", he thought that "Walk a Thin Line" was an exception to this and called the track "ethereal".

== Mick Fleetwood version ==
"Walk a Thin Line" was one of the cover songs on Mick Fleetwood's 1981 debut solo album, The Visitor. This rendition was reinterpreted with African influences, and included an African group called Adjo, who contributed percussion and vocals on the track. "As a percussion player, during these recordings, I was, as we say in England, 'like a pig in shit.'" said Fleetwood. "I had the greatest time playing with these musicians..." Fleetwood had an affinity for "Walk a Thin Line" and believed that the song "went unnoticed on Tusk. After the basic tracks were completed in Ghana, Fleetwood returned to London and invited George Harrison, Fleetwood's ex brother-in-law, into the studio to play slide guitar. George Hawkins, who sang lead vocals on the song and provided much of the instrumentation, said that Harrison "thought it was all together except maybe some slide. Our eyes lit up and Richard Dashut had him set up and ready to go in about ten seconds, before he had a chance to change his mind. So he played, then sang backgrounds with Sara [Recor]."

At the beginning of the Mirage recording sessions, Fleetwood presented his own version of "Walk a Thin Line" to Lindsey Buckingham, the original writer of the song. Fleetwood said that he remembered "sitting Lindsey down and playing him that song" and said that he was "really moved hearing our crazy band from Africa doing one of his tracks."

=== Personnel ===
- Mick Fleetwood – drums, percussion
- George Hawkins – lead vocals, bass guitar, piano, guitar
- George Harrison – twelve string guitar, slide guitar, backing vocals
- Sara Recor – backing vocals
- Adjo group — backing vocals
