= The Visitor (Mick Fleetwood album) =

Studio album by Mick Fleetwood
- Released: 30 June 1981
- Recorded: January–February 1981
- Studios: Ghana Film Industries, Inc. (Accra, Ghana)
- Genres: Pop rock; blues
- Length: 37:57
- Label: RCA Records
- Producers: Mick Fleetwood; Richard Dashut

Mick Fleetwood chronology
The Visitor (1981)	I'm Not Me (1983)

Singles from The Visitor
- 1. "You Weren't in Love" Released: September 1981; 2. "Walk a Thin Line" Released: 1981 (Aus/NZ)

The Visitor is the debut solo album by Mick Fleetwood, released by RCA Records on 30 June 1981. All the songs were recorded in Accra, Ghana between January and February 1981 at the "Ghana Film Industries, Inc. Studio" and produced by Richard Dashut, and were later mixed in various studios in England. The album contains a mixture of covers and original material written by George Hawkins and Todd Sharp, both of whom provided some of the album's instrumentation. Several Ghanaian musicians and ensembles also participated in the recording sessions, including Ebaali Gbiko, Adjo Group, and The Superbrains.

The album peaked at number 43 on the US Billboard 200 album chart and has been re-released several times, including a US CD release by Wounded Bird Records on October 18, 2011.

== Background ==
After Fleetwood Mac's Tusk Tour, the band agreed to take an extended hiatus to pursue individual projects. Fleetwood had expressed interest in making a record rooted in African music in 1978, although this idea was not fully realized until he travelled to Ghana. During the trip, he formulated the idea of collaborating with local musicians in Ghana to perform a mixture of Western and traditional African songs.

Fleetwood asked Warner Brothers to finance the project, but the record label turned him down as they were unwilling to give him three hundred thousand dollars to fly the necessary equipment out to Ghana and arrange for the recording sessions. Upon reaching out to RCA Records, the label's president, Robert Summer, met with Fleetwood for lunch and agreed to fund the project. Summer received an acknowledgment in the liner notes, reading "special thanks for believing." Fleetwood told Cary Darling of Billboard that he was not disappointed about the refusal of Warner Bros to fund the project and was pleased that RCA accepted his offer. Once the financing of the album was settled, Fleetwood flew out to Accra, the capital of Ghana, where Fleetwood and his manager Mickey Shapiro scouted the area for musicians.

Fleetwood's original plan was to send mixing desks and tape machines to local musicians in Ghana so they could record in their home localities, although he decided against this as the road conditions in the country rendered it impossible to transport the equipment. Fleetwood instead arranged for studio sessions with Faisal Helwani, who had the only functioning professional studio in Accra. He also consulted with Craig Woodson, a musicologist and professor at UCLA, who played him various tape recordings to prepare Fleetwood for his trip. He also asked Woodson if it would be appropriate to straddle English words onto existing African songs; he ultimately decided against doing this as he was concerned that it would be culturally insensitive. Fleetwood also told Woodson that he wanted to "play around with the material" while still remaining faithful to the song structures.

Fleetwood had originally asked Bob Welch, a former member of Fleetwood Mac, to appear on The Visitor, but Welch was too busy to participate. Instead, George Hawkins accompanied him on the trip. He later appeared on Fleetwood's I'm Not Me album from 1983 as a member and co-lead vocalist of Mick Fleetwood's Zoo. In an interview with Hit Parader, which was conducted after the recording sessions for The Visitor and before the album's release, Fleetwood explained his vision for the project.

It's a wild thought I've had for years. I don't like to call it a solo album, but I guess that's what it is, but it's not like I'll be the only singer. It's not going to be an arsty-crafty percussionists' LP. I don't want to do such obscure things that they won't get played on the radio.

— Mick Fleetwood

== Recording ==
Fleetwood departed from the United States to Ghana with ten tons of recording equipment. While travelling to Ghana for the recording sessions, Fleetwood's credit card was cut off in part due to his financial problems with property investments. Randy Ezratty used his nascent company Effanel Music to transport the gear in flight cases and used a mobile studio to record the album. This was the very first project taken on by Effanel Music, which later went on to provide remote recording artists to albums including George Harrison's Live in Japan, 24 Nights by Eric Clapton, and Under a Blood Red Sky by U2.

Fleetwood, Hawkins, Todd Sharp, and Richard Dashut stayed at the Star Hotel in Accra and commuted from there to record at Ghana Film Studios. Fred Shruers of Rolling Stone, who visited the Star Hotel to interview Fleetwood, described their living quarters as a "small, drum-cluttered 'chalet' where the members lived "dorm-style". Hawkins said that the group was sick with dysentery and that one person also came down with malaria. Fleetwood had contracted an intestinal issue for over a week during his stay in Accra. They were assigned a houseboy who according to Hawkins, stole their beer and underwear; in one instance the houseboy also "caught the kitchen on fire". The musicians's union in Ghana was paid a sum of $10,000 upfront and all musicians who appeared on the album received full composer's and musician's royalties. In total, over 200 musicians participated in the recording sessions.

Following the seven-week recording session in Ghana, Fleetwood returned to England for mixing and overdubbing. These sessions took place at a studio situated in a mill that was owned by Jimmy Page. Fleetwood acknowledged in an interview with Billboard that he expected some members of Fleetwood Mac to question the commercial viability of the album, but said that he wanted The Visitor to be accessible to the general public. He reckoned that the album "would have sat on the shelf in some little record store" if he had pursued a purely African record. In total, the album cost between $400,000 and $500,000 to make, and Fleetwood failed to recuperate those losses through album sales.

Two tracks on The Visitor were covers of Fleetwood Mac songs: "Rattlesnake Shake" was originally recorded for the band's 1969 album Then Play On, and "Walk a Thin Line" first appeared on their 1979 album Tusk. Peter Green sang lead vocals and played lead guitar on "Rattlesnake Shake", and was credited in the liner notes as Peter Greenbaum. Fleetwood selected "Walk a Thin Line" for inclusion to his belief that the song "went unnoticed on Tusk." His former brother-in-law, George Harrison, also appeared on "Walk a Thin Line". Hawkins recalled that Fleetwood gave Harrison a phone call and asked him to visit Page's recording studio. Once Harrison arrived, they played "Walk a Thin Line" for him, who recommended the addition of a slide guitar. Hawkins said that Dashut had Harrison "set up and ready to go in about ten seconds before he had a chance to change his mind."

Prior to the release of The Visitor, Fleetwood mentioned that he had recorded covers of "Not Fade Away" and "Raining in My Heart" and said that both of these songs would appear on the album. Of those two, "Not Fade Away" was selected, which incorporated the use of African hand drums among other instrumentation. Fleetwood also decided to cover "You Weren't in Love with Me" after hearing the song in an Australian bar with Dashut prior to their trip to Ghana. They approached the bar owner, who told them that the song's composer, Billy Field, had brought the song in specifically to play at the bar. "You Weren't in Love With Me" was still a demo at the time Fleetwood and Dashut heard it, but the song still piqued their interest, prompting them to research Field's musical work the next day. On The Visitor, "You Weren't in Love with Me" carried the truncated name, "You Weren't in Love". Sharp created the title for "Don't Be Sorry, Just Be Happy" from various slogans dispersed around Accra. "O Niamali" and "Amelle (Come On Show Me Your Heart" were written by the African musician Nii Amartey. In total, four of the album's ten tracks were penned by Ghanaian composers.

== Release ==
The Visitor debuted on the US Billboard 200 at number 140 in July 1981, and later reached its peak of number 43 on the week dated 29 August 1981, coincidentally the same week that Fleetwood Mac bandmate Stevie Nicks' debut solo album Bella Donna reached number two. For the week dated 5 September 1981, The Visitor remained at number 43 for a second consecutive week and Bella Donna hit number one. In a 1982 interview, Fleetwood speculated that the album sold roughly 250,000 copies.

RCA International hosted an audio-visual presentation of The Visitor at the Trianon Place in Versailles, France, after which they held a press conference, cocktails, and a dinner. Attendees included members of RCA's European subsidiaries and licensees, music writers, and radio personnel.

A film crew was present at Ghana Film Studios to document the recording sessions. There were tentative plans in September 1981 to release a special on PBS using footage captured by the film crew; a documentary on The Visitor, produced by the BBC, was ultimately aired on MTV the following month. A CED videodisc was later issued by RCA containing various visual footage from the recording sessions. High Fidelity magazine reported that the videodisc possessed some synchronisation errors with the audio and visuals.

In a 1987 interview, Fleetwood reflected on The Visitor with the Honolulu Star-Bulletin, saying that he was "very proud" of the album. He also said that he no longer owned a copy of The Visitor since he gave all of his away.

== Reception ==
Professional ratings
Review scores
Source	Rating
AllMusic	4.5/5 stars
Encyclopedia of Popular Music	1/5 stars
Record Mirror	4/5 stars

Upon the album's release, Shapiro commented that the album "was not received with a great deal of enthusiasm by commercial recording interests in the US." Stereo Review was relatively positive on the album, saying that the album's production is "more loving than slick, an approach that commands respect." Henry McNulty of the Hartford Courant thought that the album was "quite a departure from anything Fleetwood (or his group) has done before, and thought the results are fascinating and thoroughly professional, they are not your standard rock songs and most likely won't break sales records."

Record Mirror called The Visitor "a finely crafted piece of work" and said that "the tracks written and largely performed by the Ghanaians are far and away the most successful on the LP." Record Business said that the album was "far from a dilettante excursion to West Africa for a few ethnic sound effects" and that it instead "makes for a solid listening", adding that "the African feel is all there, but skillfully blended with straightforward rock drumming".

Record World said that the Fleetwood combined "guitar rock, accessible pop, superstar guests and African musicians on one of the year's surprises." Cashbox referred to The Visitor as "a subtly beautiful album" that was "heavily influenced by Ghanan musicians and arrangements". Writing for Musician magazine, Fred Schruers called The Visitor "the most melody-rich record I've heard this year" that was "made with wit, respect and a clear conscience."

== Track listing ==
Side one
No.	Title	Writer(s)	Length
1.	"Rattlesnake Shake"	Peter Green	3:49
2.	"You Weren't in Love"	Billy Field	3:55
3.	"O' Niamali"	Nii Amartey	2:47
4.	"Super Brains" (instrumental)	A. B. Crentsil	4:07
5.	"Don't Be Sorry, Just Be Happy"	Todd Sharp	4:24

Side two
No.	Title	Writer(s)	Length
1.	"Walk a Thin Line"	Lindsey Buckingham	3:19
2.	"Not Fade Away"	Buddy Holly; Norman Petty	2:22
3.	"Cassiopeia Surrender"	George Hawkins	4:34
4.	"The Visitor"	C. K. Ganjo	4:05
5.	"Amelle (Come on Show Me Your Heart)"	Amartey	4:35
Total length:			37:57

== Personnel ==
Band

- Mick Fleetwood – drums (1–3, 5–9), percussion (1, 6), extra percussion (1), water gong (5)
- George Hawkins – lead vocals (2, 5–8), bass guitar (1–3, 5–8, 10), piano (2, 6, 9), guitar (6), organ (8, 10)
- Todd Sharp – guitars (1, 2, 5, 7), rhythm guitar (4), lead guitar (8)

Additional musicians

- Lord Tiki – congas, hand drums (1, 2, 7), percussion (7)
- Ebaali Gbiko (children's drum ensemble) – hand drums (1, 8), backing vocals (1)
- The Ghana Folkloric Group – vocals and instrumentation (9)
- Superbrains – instrumentation (4)
- Adjo Group – vocals and instrumentation (3, 10), backing vocals (6, 7), hand drums (7), percussion (7)
- Dicky Dash and the Clapettes (Richard Dashut) – extra percussion (1)
- Tony Todaro – extra percussion (1)
- Accra Roman Catholic Choir – backing vocals (2)
- Sara Recor – backing vocals (6)

Guest musicians

- Peter Greenbaum – lead vocals (1), guitar (1, 4)
- George Harrison – twelve string guitar (6), slide guitar (6), backing vocals (6)
- Ian Bairnson – lead guitar (7), rhythm guitar (8)
- Mike Moran – Prophet-5 synthesizer (9)
- Andrew Powell – string arrangements

Production

- Mick Fleetwood; Richard Dashut – producers
- Mickey Shapiro – executive producer
- Andrew Powell; Mike Moran – arrangers (1–2, 5)
- Richard Dashut; Richard Aaron; Mick Fleetwood (Sx 70) – photography
- Richard Dashut; Mick Fleetwood – album concept
- James Campus; Anthony Cohen – album design

Technical crew

- Richard Dashut – engineer
- Bill Youdelman – engineer in Ghana
- Randy Ezratty – engineer, recording equipment and coordination
- Jim Barnes – production coordinator in Ghana
- Tony Todaro – road and equipment manager

== Charts ==
Chart (1981)	Peak position
Australian Albums (Kent Music Report)	80
US Billboard 200	43
