= Blue Again! =

Blue Again

Live album by The Mick Fleetwood Blues Band feat. Rick Vito
- Released: 13 October 2008
- Recorded: 8 February 2008
- Genre: Blues, rock
- Label: Hypertension
- Producer: Mick Fleetwood, Rick Vito

The Mick Fleetwood Blues Band feat. Rick Vito chronology
Something Big (2004)	Blue Again (2008)	Celebrate the Music of Peter Green and the Early Years of Fleetwood Mac (2021)

Blue Again is a live album by the Mick Fleetwood Blues Band, featuring Rick Vito, released in 2008. It was recorded at The Sheldon Concert Hall in St. Louis, Missouri on 8 February 2008.

== Background ==
The album represented a return to the blues music with which Fleetwood first found success, as a founding member of Fleetwood Mac in the late 1960s. In the sleeve notes, he dedicated the album to his original Fleetwood Mac bandmates, Peter Green, John McVie and Jeremy Spencer, and to the legacy of Fleetwood Mac. Around half the tracks on the album were Peter Green compositions.

Fleetwood did not seek to copy the original Fleetwood Mac, rather to "pay it tribute by creating something both historically respectful yet new and invigorated." To this end, he recruited former Fleetwood Mac guitarist Rick Vito, who had played on the Behind the Mask album in 1990, together with two relative unknowns, Lenny Castellanos and Mark Johnstone, to form the Mick Fleetwood Blues Band. The band subsequently undertook a tour of the United States, and later in 2008, Europe, including an appearance at the Notodden Blues Festival in Norway.

The album was accompanied by a short bonus CD of studio recordings, including new versions of Green's "Albatross" and "The Supernatural", recorded in Nashville and Hawaii.

== Track listing ==
=== Live CD ===
1. "Red Hot Gal" (Rick Vito) – 5:34
2. "Looking for Somebody" (Peter Green) – 5:02
3. "Fleetwood Boogie" (Vito) – 5:19
4. "Stop Messin' Round" (Clifford Adams, Green) – 3:56
5. "Rattlesnake Shake" (Green) – 5:55
6. "When We Do the Lucky Devil" (Vito) – 4:38
7. "Love That Burns" (Green) – 6:03
8. "Medley: Rollin' Man / Bayou Queen" (Green, Vito) – 5:06
9. "Black Magic Woman" (Green) – 8:38
10. "I Got a Hole in My Shoe" (Vito) – 4:10
11. "Shake Your Moneymaker" (Elmore James) – 7:49

=== Bonus CD ===
1. "Albatross" (Green) [studio bonus track recorded in Hawaii] – 3:15
2. "Napili Nocturne" (Vito) – 3:38
3. "The Supernatural" (Green) – 3:00
4. "La Mer d'Amour" (Vito) – 4:20

== Personnel ==
=== Live CD ===
- Rick Vito – guitar, vocals
- Lenny Castellanos – bass guitar, backing vocals
- Mark Johnstone – keyboards, backing vocals
- Mick Fleetwood – drums

=== Bonus CD ===
- Rick Vito – guitar, bass guitar, keyboards
- Mick Fleetwood – drums
- Produced by Mick Fleetwood and Rick Vito
- Executive Producer – Mick Fleetwood, Jonathan Todd and William Reeve Pie
- Bonus CD mixed by Rick Vito, Dennis Mays and Lynn Peterson

== Charts ==
Chart (2008)	Peak position
UK Independent Albums (OCC)	49
Chart (2010)	
Australian Albums (ARIA Charts)	96
