= Something Big (Mick Fleetwood Band album) =

Studio album by The Mick Fleetwood Band
- Released: 28 September 2004
- Genre: Rock, blues-rock

The Mick Fleetwood Band chronology
Shakin' the Cage (1992)	Something Big (2004)	Blue Again! (2008)

Something Big is the fifth album by Mick Fleetwood, released on 28 September 2004. The album features a number of guest musicians, including Fleetwood Mac's John McVie, Jeremy Spencer a member of the original Fleetwood Mac, and singer-songwriter Jackson Browne.

As of February 2005, the album has sold over 3,000 copies in the U.S. Like many Mick Fleetwood albums, it has been released several times. It is so far the only Mick Fleetwood album to be credited to "The Mick Fleetwood Band".

== Track listing ==
- All tracks written by Todd Smallwood, except where noted:
1. "Bitter End"
2. "Something Big"
3. "Where the Wind Blows"
4. "It's Only Money"
5. "Walking with the Angels"
6. "Making Other Plans"
7. "These Walls"
8. "Looking into You" (Jackson Browne)
9. "Passion" (Mick Fleetwood, Smallwood)
10. "No Borders" (Carlos Santana, Smallwood)
11. "Watching Over You"
12. "Heaven Sent"

== Personnel ==
- Mick Fleetwood – vocals, bells, drums, percussion, tambourine, talking drum
- Todd Smallwood – vocals, guitar, bass guitar, dobro, Hammond B3, harp, keyboards, mandolin, shaker, piano
- Jackson Browne – vocals
- Lauren Evans – vocals
- Alan Simon – acoustic guitar
- Jeremy Spencer – guitar
- Matt Andes – slide guitar
- John McVie – bass guitar
- Chris Golden – bass guitar
- Andro Kotula – bass guitar
- Oleg Schramm – Hammond organ, piano
- Karen Goulding – viola
- Guenevere Measham – cello
- Julie Rogers – violin
- Oliver Brown – congas
- Steve Shehan – percussion
- Jim Christie – percussion
- April Hendrix-Haberlan – backing vocals
- Sidney Iverson – backing vocals

Production

- Mick Fleetwood – executive producer, producer
- Jonathan Todd – executive producer
- Todd Smallwood – producer, engineer
- Engineered by Jackson Brown – engineer
- Todd Smallwood – engineer
- Alan Simon – engineer
- Oleg Schramm – engineer
- Phillips Nichols – engineer
- Mark Needham – engineer
- Bill Lane – engineer
- Randy Kizer – engineer
