= Ramirez Canyon Park =

Park in Los Angeles County, California, United States

- Former name: Barbra Streisand Center for Conservancy Studies
- Location within California Location within the United States
- Location: Los Angeles County, California, United States
- Nearest city: Malibu, California
- Coordinates: 34°2′19″N 118°47′39″W
- Area: 22.5 acres (9.1 ha)
- Established: 1993
- Operator: Santa Monica Mountains Conservancy
- Website: Official website

Ramirez Canyon Park is a public park owned by the state of California. Barbra Streisand donated this estate to the state-run Santa Monica Mountains Conservancy in 1993. The estate has 22.5 acres (9.1 ha) of lush vegetation, streams, and bridges. There are five homes on the estate.

An access trail from Kanan Dume Road was approved in 2015. Trails to connect Ramirez Canyon with Escondido Canyon and Corral Canyon parks are being planned.

The park was renamed Ramirez Canyon Park in 2009. In May 2011, Governor Jerry Brown announced a plan to sell the park as part of a budget he has put forward. The sale of the park was opposed by the Santa Monica Mountains Conservancy, which owns and manages the park.

In the 2018 massive California fires, the Peach House, the most famous structure of former Barbra Streisand's Malibu estate, which was donated to the state as open space, was completely destroyed. Four other buildings were saved in what is known as Ramirez Canyon Park (MRCA).

== See also ==
- List of botanical gardens in the United States
