= Rick Vito =

American guitarist and singer (born 1949)

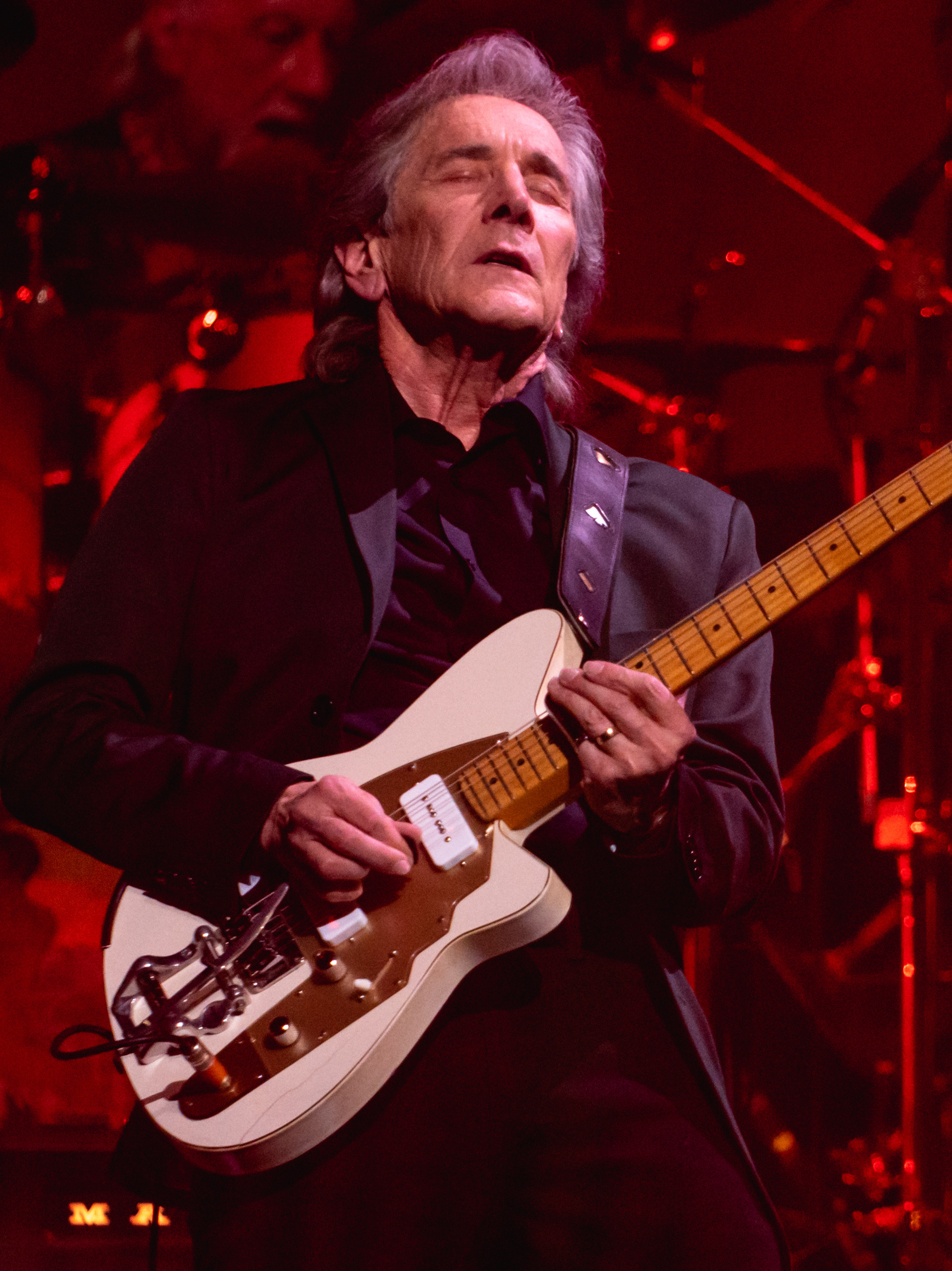
- Vito in concert with Mick Fleetwood, 2020

Background information
- Born: Richard Vito; October 13, 1949 (age 76); Darby, Pennsylvania, U.S.
- Genres: Blues, Swing, Roots rock, World
- Occupations: Musician, songwriter
- Instruments: Guitar, vocals, bass, keyboards
- Years active: 1969 – present

Richard Francis Vito (born October 13, 1949) is an American guitarist and singer. He was a member of Fleetwood Mac between 1987 and 1991, taking over as lead guitarist after Lindsey Buckingham left the group. He is best known for his blues and slide guitar style, whose influences include Elmore James, Robert Nighthawk, B.B. King, Chuck Berry, Alvino Rey, Les Paul, Django Reinhart, and Keith Richards.

== Career ==
Vito began his professional career in 1971 upon moving to Los Angeles and subsequently joining Delaney & Bonnie & Friends, also working with Todd Rundgren and Derek & The Dominos’ Bobby Whitlock. Vito has been a featured player on Bob Seger's albums since 1986. He played the slide guitar solo on the Bob Seger song (and Chevy truck TV commercial), "Like a Rock". He was a long-standing member of Bonnie Raitt's touring band in the 1980s and 1990s. Vito also recorded and/ or performed with John Mayall, Jackson Browne, Little Richard, Roger McGuinn, Boz Scaggs, Roy Orbison, Dobie Gray, John Fogerty, Stevie Nicks, Albert Collins, Dolly Parton, Maria Muldaur, Bob Seger, and many others. Vito has had ten solo CD releases and tours often in Europe and the US with his own band. He produced rockabilly singer Rosie Flores' CD, “Speed of Sound”. His CD/DVD production collaboration with Mick Fleetwood, Blue Again!, received a Grammy nomination in 2010. Vito is also the recipient of the W.C. Handy Blues Award. Mojo on My Side was released in Europe in 2014, and worldwide in 2015 on Delta Groove Records with two new tracks. His CD, “Soulshaker “was released on 5 April 2019; his 11th solo CD, “Cadillac Man”, was released March 22, 2024, and his latest, “Slidemaster,” an all slide guitar instrumental album, was released on April 3, 2026.

Vito performed with the Mick Fleetwood Blues Band internationally including at the Byron Bay Bluesfest over Easter 2016. He also participated in an all-star tribute to Fleetwood Mac founder Peter Green at the London Palladium in February 2020. Billed as "Mick Fleetwood & Friends," the show highlighted Vito's guitar and vocals alongside of Billy Gibbons, Pete Townshend, David Gilmour, Jonny Lang, John Mayall, Christine McVie, Bill Wyman, Jeremy Spencer and more.

=== Fleetwood Mac ===
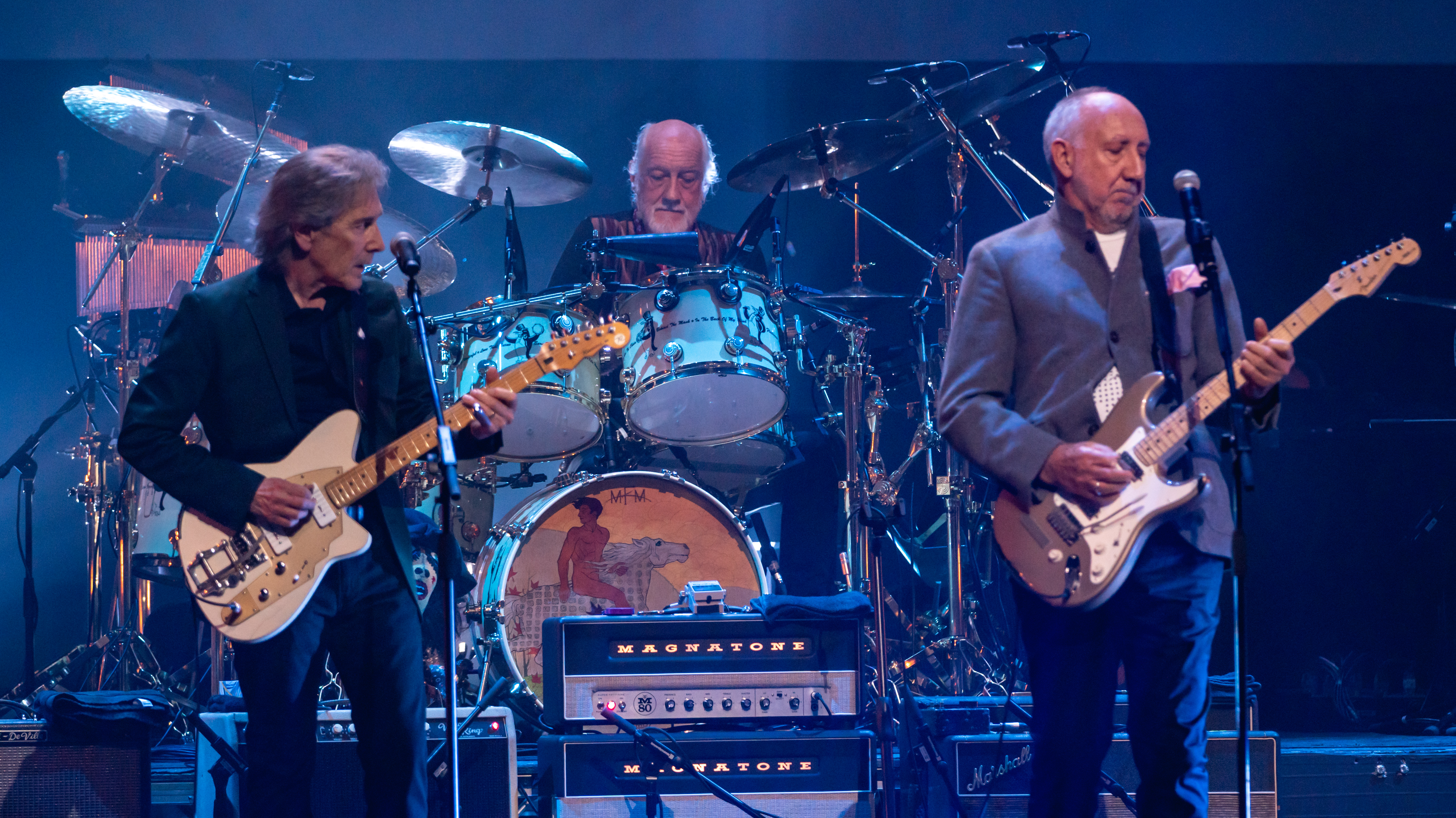
Vito performing with Mick Fleetwood and Pete Townshend in 2020

In 1987, Lindsey Buckingham left Fleetwood Mac before the band began their Shake the Cage Tour. Mick Fleetwood then asked Rick Vito to join the group as the lead guitarist. Vito and Billy Burnette officially joined Fleetwood Mac in September 1987. He first appeared on the band's 1988 Greatest Hits album, which features Vito's playing on "As Long as You Follow" and "No Questions Asked", which were recorded specifically for the compilation. He then worked with the band on their Behind the Mask album, which was released in 1990. Vito left Fleetwood Mac in November 1991 to begin working on a solo career. Despite his departure from the group, Vito joined his former bandmates Christine McVie, Mick Fleetwood, Burnette, and John McVie to play the pre-game show of Super Bowl XXVII in January 1993.

Vito later joined the Mick Fleetwood Blues Band in 2008 as frontman, lead guitarist and co-producer. The band recorded a live album, Blue Again!, which was nominated for a Grammy Award for Best Blues Album in 2010. The Mick Fleetwood Blues Band was put on hold in 2017, although he did perform with Fleetwood, John Mayall, Christine McVie, Bill Wyman and others in 2020 for a performance honoring the music of Peter Green, a founding member of Fleetwood Mac.

== Filmography ==
- The Last Castle (2001) Red Team leader
- Angel Eyes (2005) (songwriter: "It's 2 A.M.")
- Firewall (2006) (songwriter and performer: "She's So Crazy")
- Evil Bong (2006) (TV) singer

== Discography ==
- 1969 The Wright Brothers (an unreleased 4-song EP, recorded/produced by colleague Neil Kempfer-Stocker; Vito-lead guitar).

=== Fleetwood Mac ===
- 1988 Greatest Hits - guitars and backing vocals on two songs.
- 1990 Behind the Mask
- 1992 25 Years – The Chain
- 2002 The Very Best of Fleetwood Mac

=== The Mick Fleetwood Blues Band Featuring Rick Vito ===
- 2008 : Blue Again!
- 2016 : Live at the Belly Up Tavern

=== Solo albums ===
- 1992 King of Hearts
- 1998 Pink & Black
- 2000 Lucky Devils
- 2001 Crazy Cool
- 2003 Band Box Boogie
- 2005 Rattlesnake Shake
- 2006 Talk That Talk
- 2009 Lucky in Love: The Best of Rick Vito
- 2014 Mojo on My Side (European Version)
- 2015 Mojo on My Side (Worldwide Version)
- 2019 Soulshaker
- 2024 Cadillac Man
- 2026 Slidemaster

=== Guest performances ===
- 1972 Something/Anything? – Todd Rundgren
- 1972 Raw Velvet – Bobby Whitlock
- 1973 “They Love Me, They Love Me Not”- Genya Ravan
- 1973 "All I See Is You" - Rabindra Danks
- 1975 New Year, New Band, New Company – John Mayall
- 1975 Common Sense – John Prine
- 1975 Change – Spanky and Our Gang
- 1975 Notice to Appear – John Mayall
- 1975 Growing Pains – Jamie Owens
- 1976 A Banquet in Blues – John Mayall
- 1976 Prime Prine – John Prine
- 1976 Street Talk – Bob Crewe
- 1977 Playing to an Audience Of One – David Soul
- 1977 Thunderbyrd – Roger McGuinn
- 1978 Kissin' in the California Sun – Katy Moffatt
- 1978 Randy Richards – Randy Richards
- 1979 High and Outside – Steve Goodman
- 1979 Open Your Eyes – Maria Muldaur
- 1980 Blue Delicacies – Ronnie Barron
- 1980 No More Interviews – John Mayall
- 1982 Fast Times at Ridgemont High (Original Soundtrack) – Various/Jackson Browne
- 1982 Green Light – Bonnie Raitt
- 1982 The Perfect Stranger – Jesse Colin Young
- 1982 Revenge Will Come – Greg Copeland
- 1982 Walk On – Karen Brooks
- 1983 Lawyers in Love – Jackson Browne
- 1983 Tell Me the Truth – Timothy B Schmit
- 1984 Inside the Fire – Rita Coolidge
- 1985 One Heart at a Time – Don Francisco
- 1986 Like a Rock – Bob Seger
- 1986 Lives in the Balance – Jackson Browne
- 1987 A Very Special Christmas – Various/Bob Seger
- 1987 Rainbow – Dolly Parton
- 1989 Mystery Girl – Roy Orbison
- 1989 Rock Rhythm & Blues – Various/Christine McVie
- 1990 Gypsy Moon – Troy Newman
- 1990 Brent Bourgeois – Brent Bourgeois
- 1991 The Fire Inside – Bob Seger
- 1992 Born to Rock and Roll – Roger McGuinn
- 1992 Not Alone – Thomas Jefferson Kaye
- 1993 Great Days: A John Prine Anthology – John Prine
- 1994 Craig Shoemaker Meets the Lovemaster – Craig Shoemaker
- 1994 Greatest Hits – Bob Seger
- 1994 Peter Frampton – Peter Frampton
- 1994 Meet Me at Midnite – Maria Muldaur
- 1995 It's a Mystery – Bob Seger
- 1995 All Day Thumbsucker Revisited: The History of Blue Thumb Records – Various/John Mayall
- 1997 The Next Voice You Hear: The Best of Jackson Browne – Jackson Browne
- 1998 Southland of the Heart – Maria Muldaur
- 1998 Thinkin' About You – Rita Coolidge
- 1999 Extremely Cool – Chuck E. Weiss
- 1999 Steel Cowboys: Bikers' Choice, Vol. 1 – Various/Billy Burnette
- 1999 Lillith Fair Volume 3 – Bonnie Raitt
- 1999 The ABC Years – John Mayall
- 1999 Juke Rhythm – John "Juke" Logan
- 1999 Smooth Sailin' – Marty Grebb
- 2001 Nothing Personal – Delbert McClinton
- 2002 Forgive – Rebecca Lynn Howard
- 2002 Almeria Club – Hank Williams Jr.
- 2002 Fast Girl – The Tractors
- 2002 The Big Night – The Tractors
- 2002 Speed of Sound – Rosie Flores
- 2003 All Night Breakfast – Jonny Neel
- 2004 The Very Best of Jackson Browne – Jackson Browne
- 2009 Trading 8s – Carl Verheyen
- 2009 Man's Temptation – Kermit Lynch
- 2011 Steady Love – Maria Muldaur
- 2012 Donuts and Coffee – Kermit Lynch
- 2013 Memphis – Boz Scaggs
- 2014 Ride Out – Bob Seger
- 2015 Slide Guitar Summit – Arlen Roth
- 2017 Crazy Like Me - Billy Burnette
- 2018 Out of the Blues - Boz Scaggs (LP)
- 2018 Unchained Melodies - Roy Orbison
- 2020 All American Radio - Ned Evett
- 2020 Celebrate the Music of Peter Green
- 2021 These Strange Times - Mick Fleetwood
- 2024 Common Sense

- Gary Nicholson

- 2026 Jersey Town - Peter Karp

=== DVDs ===
- 1977 (rel. 2010) Rockpalast – Roger McGuinn's Thunderbyrd: West Coast Legends Vol. 4 DVD
- 1988 Fleetwood Mac: Tango in the Night Live DVD
- 2003 Rick Vito In Concert DVD
- 2003 Guitar Heroes In Concert DVD
- 2005 Rick Vito: Complete Slide Guitar DVD
- 2009 Mick Fleetwood Blues Band featuring Rick Vito: Blue Again! DVD
- 2021 “Celebrate The Music Of Peter Green” DVD
