= Shakin' the Cage =

Studio album by The Zoo
- Released: 16 June 1992
- Genres: Rock, blues rock
- Label: Capricorn
- Producers: Mick Fleetwood, Billy Thorpe

The Zoo chronology
I'm Not Me (1983)	Shakin' the Cage (1992)	Total Drumming (2001)

Shakin' the Cage is an album by Fleetwood Mac drummer Mick Fleetwood's spin-off band The Zoo, released in June 1992. The album features Bekka Bramlett who would join Fleetwood Mac the following year as well as two of Fleetwood Mac's touring musicians, the former past and the latter future: Isaac Asante and Brett Tuggle. The title track was co-written by then-Fleetwood Mac member Billy Burnette and reached the top twenty on the Billboard Album Rock Tracks chart. The album was primarily written by Australian star Billy Thorpe, who also featured in the band.

== Background ==
Fleetwood had recorded with The Zoo since 1983 and released the album I'm Not Me that same year with the band. During the 1980s, The Zoo continued to perform live with various lineups, some of which included Kenny Gradney, and Bobbye Hall. In 1987 interview, Fleetwood expressed interest in recording an album with Jeff Baxter.

Thorpe joined The Zoo in 1990 as their lead singer and primary songwriter; all of the songs on the album were either co-written or solely written by Thorpe. Fleetwood knew Thorpe as both of their daughters attended the same school in Los Angeles. The Zoo was also augmented by Bekka Bramlett, who shared lead vocals with Thorpe both on the album and the accompanying tour. Fleetwood first encountered Bramlett while she was performing onstage with her father, Delaney Bramlett; he successfully lobbied her to join The Zoo after informing her of the band's touring commitments in Australia with Thorpe.

The lineup had solidified by March 1991, during which Fleetwood was offered a one-night performance in Tasmania. Although this opportunity fell through, the band nonetheless partook in a six-week tour of Australia, where they performed among other songs an early rendition of "Shakin' the Cage". After the conclusion of the tour, the lineup decided to record a full album. Thrope reached out to Phil Walden of Capricorn Records about securing a recording contract, having already been signed to the label as a solo artist. Walden did not return Thorpe's call, so the band instead signed to Giant Records.

The initial recording sessions took place at Thorpe's home studio in Encino, Los Angeles, where the vocals were also overdubbed. Additional sessions occurred at Ocean Way Recording. Walden later received a Zoo demo tape from Russ Titelman and subsequently contacted Thorpe, asking him if he made a mistake in not signing the Zoo. The title track was released as a single and entered the US Billboard Album Rock Tracks chart on 4 July 1992. A music video for the title track was filmed in downtown Los Angeles.

== Track listing ==
All tracks written by Billy Thorpe, except where noted.

No.	Title	Writer(s)	Length
1.	"Reach Out"		5:19
2.	"God Created Woman"	Delaney Bramlett, Thorpe	4:51
3.	"Night Life"		6:01
4.	"Shakin' the Cage"	Billy Burnette, Thorpe	4:15
5.	"Voodoo"		7:26
6.	"How Does It Feel"		4:17
7.	"The Night and You"		4:19
8.	"Takin' It Out to the People"		4:33
9.	"Breakin' Up"		4:57
10.	"In Your Hands"		6:17

== Personnel ==
The Zoo

- Mick Fleetwood – drums, percussion
- Bekka Bramlett – lead and backing vocals
- Billy Thorpe – lead and backing vocals, lead and rhythm guitars, synth programming, percussion
- Gregg Wright – lead and rhythm guitars, backing vocals
- Tom Lilly – bass guitar, backing vocals
- Brett Tuggle – keyboards, backing vocals

Additional personnel

- Isaac Asante – percussion on "In Your Hands"
- Delaney & Bonnie – backing vocals on "In Your Hands"
- Kenny Gradney – bass guitar on "How Does It Feel"

=== Production ===
- Produced by Mick Fleetwood and Billy Thorpe
- Engineered by Billy Thorpe, Ken Allardyce, Rail Jon Rogut, Bob Loftus, Eric Rudd, Allen Sides
