= Mick Fleetwood =

British musician and actor (born 1947)

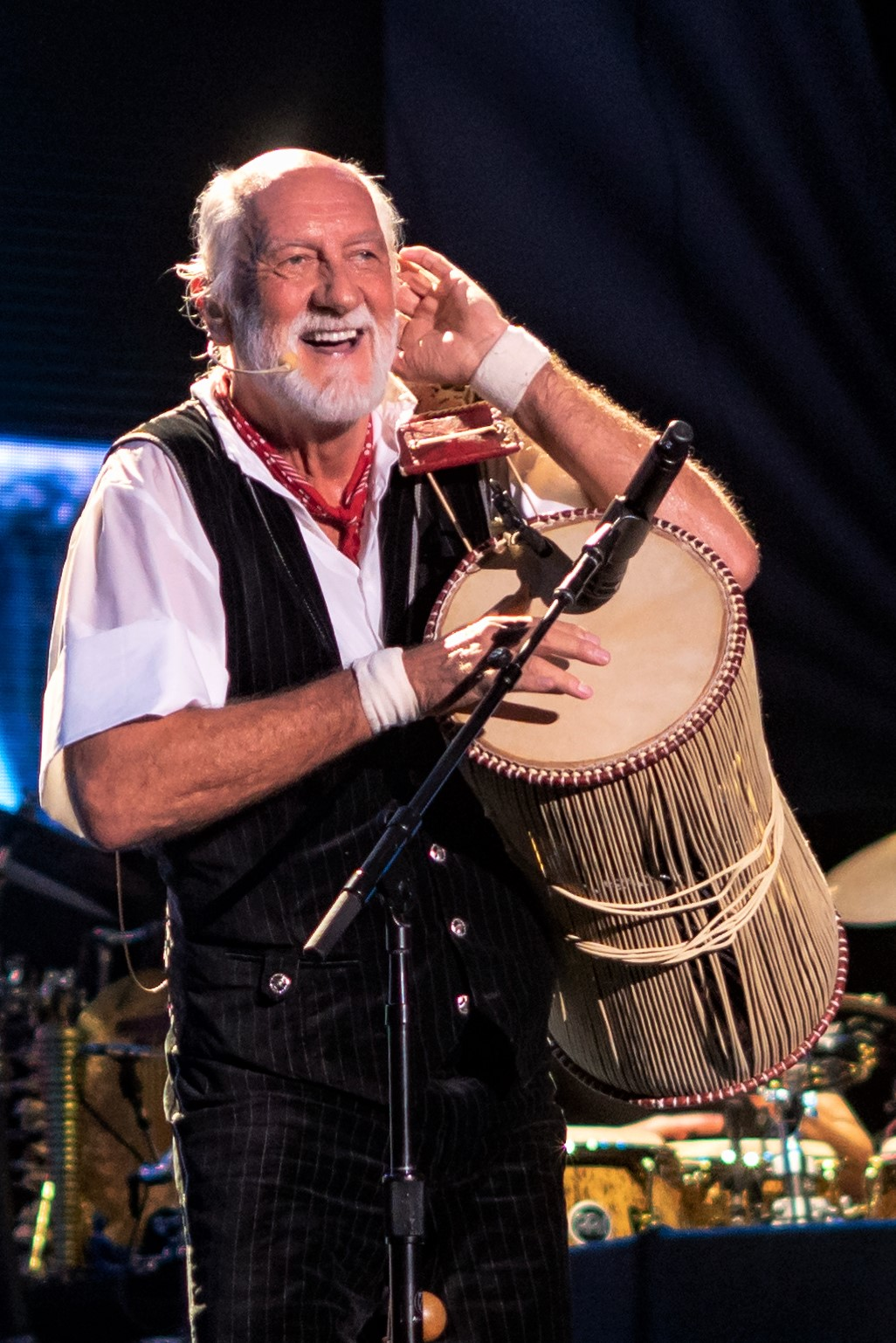
- Fleetwood performing with Fleetwood Mac in 2018
- Born: Michael John Kells Fleetwood; 24 June 1947 (age 79); Redruth, Cornwall, England
- Occupations: Musician; songwriter
- Years active: 1963–present
- Spouses: Jenny Boyd (m. 1970; div. 1976) (m. 1977; div. 1978) Sara Recor (m. 1988; div. 1995) Lynn Frankel (m. 1995; div. 2015) Elizabeth Jordan (m. 2026)
- Partner: Stevie Nicks (1977–1979)
- Children: 4
- Relatives: Susan Fleetwood (sister); Lily Donaldson (great-niece)
- Musical career
- Genres: Rock; blues; pop
- Instruments: Drums; percussion
- Labels: Blue Horizon; Warner Bros.; RCA; Sanctuary
- Formerly of: John Mayall & the Bluesbreakers; Fleetwood Mac; Mick Fleetwood's Zoo
- Website: mickfleetwood.com

Michael John Kells Fleetwood (born 24 June 1947) is a British musician and actor. He is the drummer, co-founder and leader of the rock band Fleetwood Mac. His surname was merged with that of the group's bassist John "Mac" McVie (they were the only two members to appear on every studio album during the band's run) to form the name of the band. He was inducted into the Rock and Roll Hall of Fame with Fleetwood Mac in 1998.

Born in Redruth, Cornwall, Fleetwood lived in Egypt and Norway for much of his childhood. Choosing to follow his musical interests, Fleetwood travelled to London at the age of 15, eventually forming the first incarnation of Fleetwood Mac with Peter Green, Jeremy Spencer and Bob Brunning. After several album releases and line-up changes, the group moved to the United States in 1974. Fleetwood then invited Lindsey Buckingham and Stevie Nicks to join. Buckingham and Nicks contributed to much of Fleetwood Mac's later commercial success, including the celebrated album Rumours, while Fleetwood's own determination to keep the band together was essential to the band's longevity. Fleetwood has also enjoyed a solo career, published written works, and flirted briefly with acting.

== Early life ==
Michael John Kells Fleetwood was born in Redruth, Cornwall, second child of John Joseph Kells Fleetwood and Bridget Maureen (née Brereton) Fleetwood. His elder sister was actress Susan Fleetwood. In early childhood, Fleetwood and his family followed his father, a Royal Air Force fighter pilot, to Egypt. Six years later, they moved to Norway where his father was deployed by NATO. He attended school there and became fluent in Norwegian.

Biographer Cath Carroll describes the young Fleetwood as "a dreamer, an empathetic youth" who, though intelligent, did not excel academically. According to his own autobiography, Fleetwood had an extremely difficult and trying time academically at the English boarding schools he attended, including King's School at Sherborne House in Gloucestershire and Wynstones School in Gloucestershire. He performed poorly in exams, which he attributed to his inability to memorise facts. He nevertheless enjoyed acting during school, often in drag, and was a competent fencer. At 6 ft 6 in (1.98 m) tall, he was an imposing figure and sported a beard and long hair for much of his life. "Mick was very aristocratic," recalls Ken Caillat, a sound engineer on Rumours. "The way he formed sentences was impeccable. When he spoke, everyone stopped and listened. He was quiet and wise, and he had a great sense of humour. He loved to laugh, but he was also a straight shooter."

Abandoning academic pursuits, Fleetwood took up the drums after his parents, recognising that he might find a future in music, bought him a "Gigster" drum kit when he was thirteen. His family encouraged his artistic side, as his father composed poetry and was an amateur drummer himself. Fleetwood was inspired—as he said at the Brits Awards ceremony in 1989—by Cliff Richard, Tony Meehan (drummer of the Shadows), and The Everly Brothers. With his parents' support, he dropped out of school at 15 and, in 1963, moved to London to pursue a career as a drummer. At first, he stayed with his younger sister Sally in Notting Hill. After a brief stint working at Liberty in London, he found his first opportunity in music.

== Career ==
=== Early efforts in London ===
Keyboard player Peter Bardens lived only a few doors away from Fleetwood's first home in London, and upon hearing of the proximity of an available drummer, Bardens gave Fleetwood his first gig in Bardens' band the Cheynes in July 1963, thus seeding the young drummer's musical career. It would take him from the Cheynes—with whom he supported early gigs by the Rolling Stones and the Yardbirds—to stints in the Bo Street Runners, where he replaced original drummer Nigel Hutchinson, who had enjoyed brief television fame on Ready Steady Go!. However, by April 1965, when Fleetwood joined the band, it was fading into obscurity. By February 1966, Bardens, who had left the group, called on Fleetwood to join his new band, the Peter Bs, which soon expanded to become Shotgun Express (with Rod Stewart). Peter Green, who was a guitarist in the Peter Bs, left to join John Mayall & the Bluesbreakers, followed by Fleetwood in April 1967. Mayall’s new band already featured John McVie.

Green became a supportive bandmate who helped Fleetwood in his early experimentation with the drum kit. Fleetwood was, however, dismissed from the Bluesbreakers for repeated insobriety during gigs. Both Fleetwood and McVie were heavy drinkers, and their combined efforts were too much for Mayall and the band to cope with. Green, feeling trapped within the Bluesbreakers, also left in June 1967. Recalling "his favourite rhythm section, 'Fleetwood Mac'"—Mick Fleetwood and John McVie—Green elected to invite both to join him in his new band, Fleetwood Mac. Though McVie hesitated briefly due to financial reasons, both joined Green by the summer of 1967 with a record contract on the horizon.

=== Peter Green's Fleetwood Mac ===
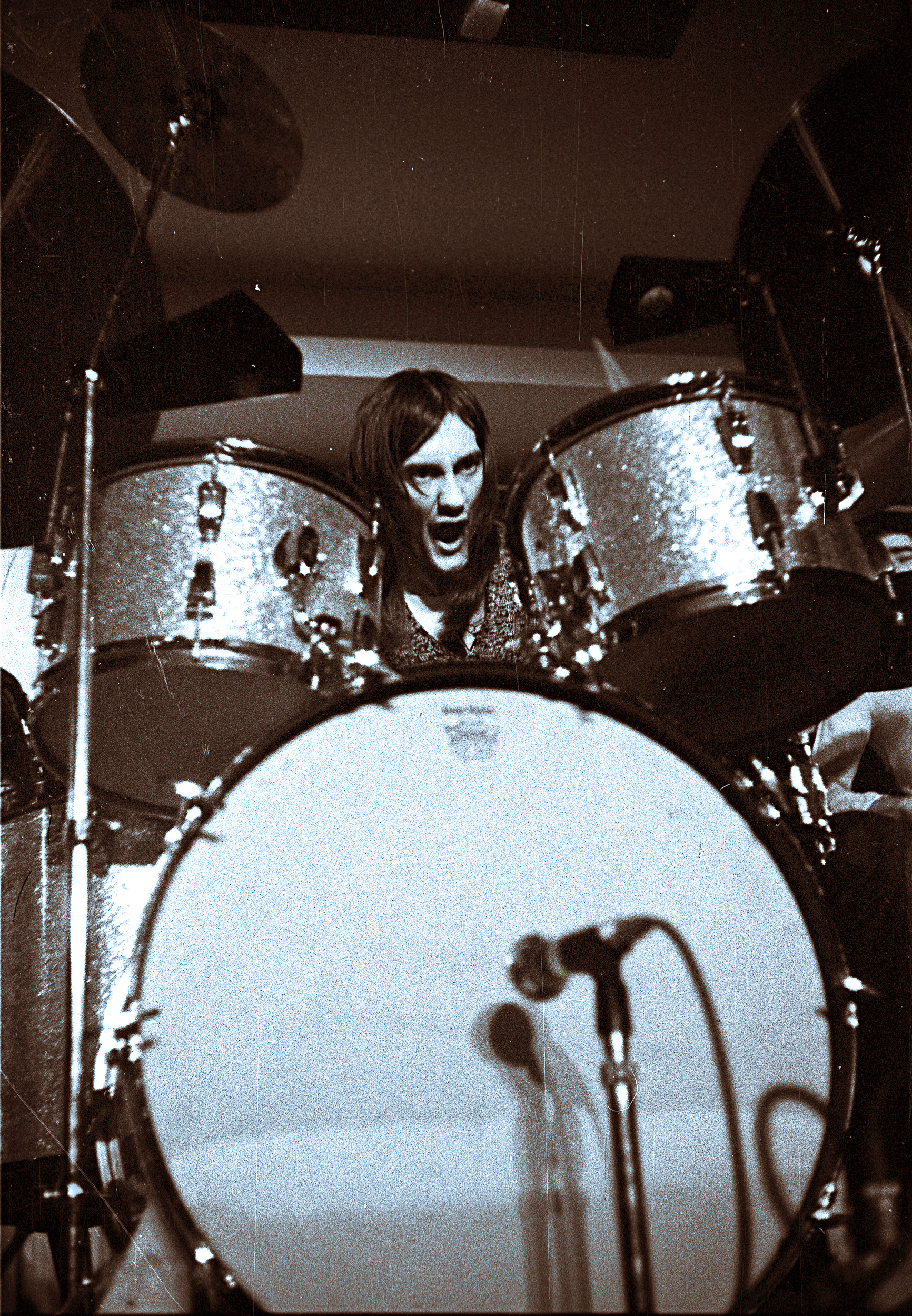
Fleetwood performing with Fleetwood Mac in 1970

The initial incarnation of Fleetwood Mac performed its first gig in August 1967 at the seventh annual Windsor Jazz and Blues Festival, playing a Chicago-style blues. McVie, initially hesitant to commit, was later prompted to leave the Bluesbreakers and join Fleetwood Mac full-time when the former adopted a horns section with which he disagreed. He replaced the initial bassist, Bob Brunning. McVie, Fleetwood, Green and guitarist Jeremy Spencer thus formed the first fixed line-up of Fleetwood Mac.

The band's first album, Peter Green's Fleetwood Mac, was released in 1968, and the band toured the United States for the first time, though Green was reluctant to do so for fear of gun crime. Upon their return, they recorded a second album, Mr. Wonderful, under simply "Fleetwood Mac" with Green's name dropped. A guest musician on the album, Christine Perfect, became close with the group. She and McVie married in 1968. A third guitarist, Danny Kirwan, was also added to the line-up. Despite the success of their third album, Then Play On, and a string of hit singles including "Albatross" and "Man of the World", Green himself drifted away from the band, struggling both creatively and with increasing use of LSD.

=== 1970–1973 ===
Fleetwood remained a consistent presence in the ever-changing line-up of the group following the departure of Green in May 1970, when Spencer and Kirwan assumed more central roles in the group's song-writing. In September 1970 the release of Kiln House saw a line-up of Spencer, Kirwan, John McVie and Fleetwood, with Christine McVie providing keyboards and backing vocals. Fleetwood, "a social creature who prized community and communication", was particularly taken with the group's new living arrangements: they moved into a large Victoria-era mansion near Headley, Hampshire.

By early 1971, with Christine McVie becoming an official member of the band, Fleetwood and the group boarded a plane to San Francisco. Spencer, fearful following the recent 1971 San Fernando earthquake, reluctantly boarded the plane. He left the hotel abruptly one afternoon and disappeared. He was found several days later to have joined Family International, then known as Children of God, a religious group. Once more, Fleetwood attempted to mediate; however, Spencer would not return. Bob Welch became their next member. Their next album, Future Games, was released later that year. Bare Trees came a year later, in 1972. During the subsequent tours to promote the latter, Kirwan's self-destructive personality and problems with alcohol culminated in a refusal to go on stage before one concert; Fleetwood himself made the decision to fire the band member. Furthermore, there were early signs of strife in the marriage of John and Christine McVie. Fleetwood stepped in to mediate between the two members, talking Christine out of a decision to leave the group. The band added guitarist Bob Weston and vocalist Dave Walker, formerly of Savoy Brown and the Idle Race. The resulting turmoil, however, negatively affected their next album, Penguin, released in 1973 to poor reviews. Walker was subsequently asked to leave the group, and the next album Mystery to Me was received more warmly.

In October 1973, Fleetwood instructed Weston—who had engaged in an affair with Fleetwood's wife—to leave Fleetwood Mac. Meanwhile, manager Clifford Davis began to lead a separate group of musicians under the name 'Fleetwood Mac', and his increasing legal assault on the original group pushed Fleetwood and his fellow band members to consider managing themselves. Fleetwood took on more managerial responsibility and leadership over the group.

=== Heroes Are Hard to Find, Fleetwood Mac, Rumours ===
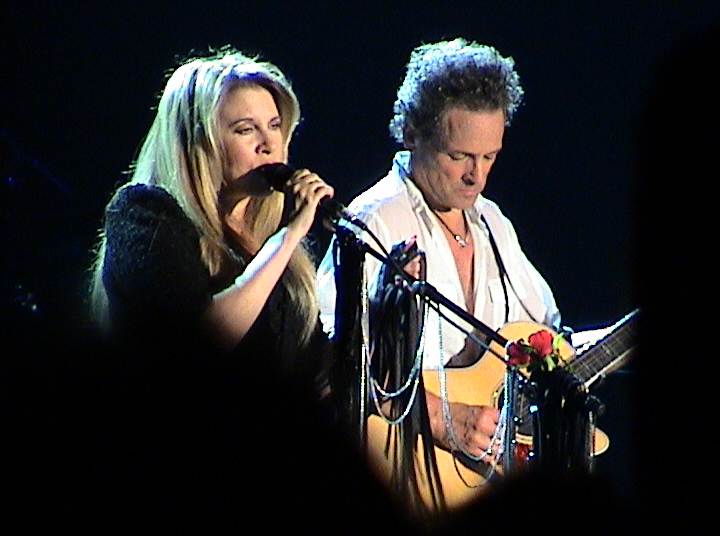
Stevie Nicks and Lindsey Buckingham on the Say You Will Tour in 2003

In 1974, the band moved to Los Angeles, where they recorded the album Heroes Are Hard to Find. By November 1974, Bob Welch had left the band. Meanwhile, Fleetwood was planning a follow-up album to Heroes Are Hard to Find – Welch's last with the group – which had charted at #34 in the US. Fleetwood was shopping with his children when a chance encounter with an old friend led him to visit Sound City and producer Keith Olsen. While at the studio, Olsen played samples from an album entitled Buckingham Nicks. Fleetwood immediately "was in awe". On New Year's Eve, 1974, Fleetwood contacted Olsen to advise him that their planned project was on hiatus after Welch's departure, however, he then suggested that Nicks and Buckingham join Fleetwood Mac. The group ate together with Nicks and Buckingham at a local restaurant before practising together for the first time in the new studio.

The next year, the new line-up released Fleetwood Mac. The album proved to be a breakthrough for the band and became a huge hit, reaching No.1 in the US and selling over five million copies. Fleetwood and Olsen collaborated on a number of drumming innovations. "It was all about 'plastic puke.' First off, for the kick drum I had Mick use a real skin, not a plastic head. All the bass drum sounds had snap and rack and warmth, but the snare drum on the whole album was a plastic puke." The album had reached No. 1 come November 1976, and at this time Fleetwood Mac became self-managing, with Fleetwood himself arguing that an external manager would be less apt at holding together such a group of dynamic personalities. He put forward an idea of promising to reimburse any losses suffered by promoters should they occur, in an attempt to raise the group's profile and earn more contracts and gigs. Freelance Rolling Stone writer John Grissim later opined that self-management had been the right decision for the band and credited Fleetwood for his leadership skills and experience. Ken Caillat, sound engineer on Rumours, had said that Fleetwood "had superb intuition and a flair for taking risks".

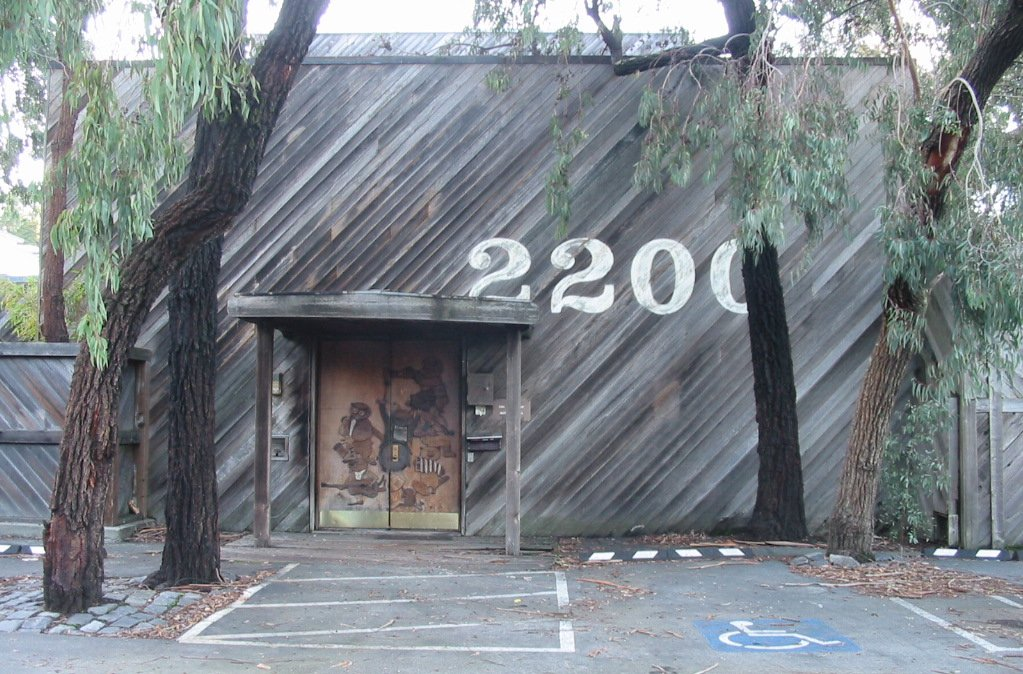
Rumours was largely recorded in Sausalito's Record Plant, a wooden structure with few windows, located at 2200 Bridgeway.

Like many musicians during the 1970s in Los Angeles, the members of Fleetwood Mac began using copious amounts of cocaine. Fleetwood would go on to recollect in his autobiography that "Until then, Fleetwood Mac hadn't had much experience with this Andean rocket fuel. Now we discovered that a toot now and then relieved the boredom of long hours in the studio with little nourishment." The personal relationships between the band members were becoming frayed. After six months of non-stop touring, the McVies divorced in August 1976, ending nearly eight years of marriage. The couple stopped talking to each other socially and discussed only musical matters. Buckingham and Nicks also fought often, a fact that was revealed to fans by Rolling Stone in April 1976. The duo's arguments stopped only when they worked on songs together. At the same time, Christine McVie and Nicks became closer. Fleetwood, meanwhile, began searching for a new recording location, and landed on the Record Plant of Sausalito, California. Grissim, working for Rolling Stone, frequently met with the group and took a particular liking to Fleetwood, whom he described as "a real pro."

Fleetwood Mac convened at the Record Plant in February 1976 with hired engineers Ken Caillat and Richard Dashut. Most band members complained about the studio and wanted to record at their homes, but Fleetwood did not allow any moves. Despite his talent at keeping the group together, the recording of Rumours was fraught with emotional turmoil due to the collapsing relationships within the line-up. Christine McVie and Nicks decided to live in two condominiums near the city's harbour, while the male contingent stayed at the studio's lodge in the adjacent hills. Chris Stone, one of the Record Plant's owners, recalled that "The band would come in at 7 at night, have a big feast, party till 1 or 2 in the morning, and then when they were so whacked-out they couldn't do anything, they'd start recording". Fleetwood often played his drum kit outside the studio's partition screen to better gauge Caillat's and Dashut's reactions to the music's groove. After the final mastering stage and hearing the songs back-to-back, the band members sensed they had recorded something "pretty powerful".

Rumours was a huge commercial success and became Fleetwood Mac's second US number one record. It stayed at the top of the Billboard 200 for 31 non-consecutive weeks, while also reaching number one in Australia, Canada, and New Zealand. The album was certified platinum in America and the UK within months of release after one million units and 300,000 units were shipped respectively. The band and co-producers Caillat and Dashut went on to win the 1978 Grammy Award for Album of the Year. By March, the album had sold over 10 million copies worldwide, including over eight million in the US alone.

=== Tusk, experimentation ===
Tusk, Fleetwood Mac's 12th studio album, was released in 1979. The work represented a more experimental direction taken by Buckingham. Fleetwood, recently diagnosed as having diabetes after suffering recurring bouts of hypoglycaemia during several live shows, was again instrumental in maintaining the band's cohesion. He placated Buckingham over feelings of creative claustrophobia and discomfort playing alongside Nicks. On the issue of Buckingham taking creative control away from the other members of the group for the creation of Tusk, Fleetwood recounts that his three-day discussion with Buckingham culminated in him telling the latter that "if it's good, then go ahead." Though the nature of the album strained relationships again within the band—particularly John McVie, a long-established blues musician who disliked the experimental nature of the album—Fleetwood himself rates the album as his favourite by Fleetwood Mac, and cites the freedom of creative expression allotted to each band member as integral to the survival of the group. The album sold four million copies worldwide, a return noticeably poorer than Rumours. Though Buckingham was blamed by the record labels, Fleetwood linked the album's relative failure to the RKO radio chain playing the album in its entirety prior to release, thus allowing mass home taping.

=== Later career ===
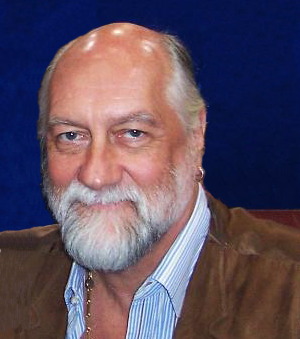
Fleetwood in 2009

Fleetwood has also led a number of side projects. 1981's The Visitor, produced by Richard Dashut, featured heavy African stylistics and a rerecording of "Rattlesnake Shake" with Peter Green.

In 1983, Fleetwood formed Mick Fleetwood's Zoo and recorded I'm Not Me. The album featured a minor hit, "I Want You Back", and a cover version of the Beach Boys' "Angel Come Home". By 1987, the band consisted of himself, Billy Burnette, Steve Ross, Kenny Gradney, and Bobbye Hall. The band embarked on some live shows before Fleetwood Mac's Shake the Cage Tour commenced.

A later version of the group featured Bekka Bramlett on vocals and recorded 1991's Shaking the Cage. Fleetwood released Something Big in 2004 with the Mick Fleetwood Band, and his most recent album is Blue Again!, appearing in October 2008 with the Mick Fleetwood Blues Band touring to support it, interspersed with the Unleashed tour of Fleetwood Mac.

Fleetwood has played drums on many of his bandmates' solo records, including Law and Order, where he played on the album's biggest hit, "Trouble". Other albums include French Kiss, Three Hearts, The Wild Heart, Christine McVie, Try Me, Under the Skin, Gift of Screws, and In Your Dreams. In 2007 he was featured on drums for the song "God" along with Jack's Mannequin in the Pop album Instant Karma: The Amnesty International Campaign to Save Darfur, a collection of covers of John Lennon songs.

Fleetwood co-authored Fleetwood—My Life and Adventures with Fleetwood Mac with writer Stephen Davis. The book was published in 1990. In the book, he discussed his experiences with other musicians including Eric Clapton, members of the Rolling Stones, Led Zeppelin, as well as the affair with Stevie Nicks and his addiction to cocaine and his personal bankruptcy. Reception was mixed. Robert Waddell of the New York Times described the piece as "a blithe, slapdash memoir." The Los Angeles Times's Steve Hochman noted that "Fleetwood tells the story as if he was sitting in your living room, which is good for the intimacy of the tale, but bad for the rambling, sometimes redundant telling." Hochman did acknowledge that Fleetwood was "one of rock's more colorful characters."

Fleetwood has a secondary career as a TV and film actor, usually in minor parts. His roles in this field have included a leader of the Resistance in The Running Man (1987), and as a guest alien in the Star Trek: The Next Generation episode "Manhunt" (1989).

Fleetwood co-hosted the 1989 BRIT Awards, which contained numerous gaffes and flubbed lines. In the wake of this public mishap, the BRIT Awards were pre-recorded for the next 18 years; the awards are now again broadcast live to the British public.

In 1998, Fleetwood was inducted into the Rock and Roll Hall of Fame as a member of Fleetwood Mac.

Fleetwood had been a member of Fleetwood Mac since 1967, and was the only member of the band to have remained in the band throughout its entire history, which effectively ended in 2022.

== Playing style ==
God knows, if the drums aren't right, then the song is not survivable.

— Mick Fleetwood

Fleetwood was a self-taught drummer from his early childhood, after moving from a lacklustre academic performance at school to a love of music encouraged by his family, who bought him his first drum kit. His first years were heavily influenced by Tony Meehan and The Everly Brothers, and during his formative years in London during the late 1960s, Green helped Fleetwood through bouts of "rhythmic dyslexia" during live performances when Fleetwood panicked and lost the beat. He often sang filled pauses along to songs to help keep the beat. Green also instilled in Fleetwood an ability to follow and predict the lead guitarist, enabling him to meet the guitar with the drum rhythm as well as allowing him to know a good guitarist when he saw one—which would in part lead him later in his career to select Lindsey Buckingham.

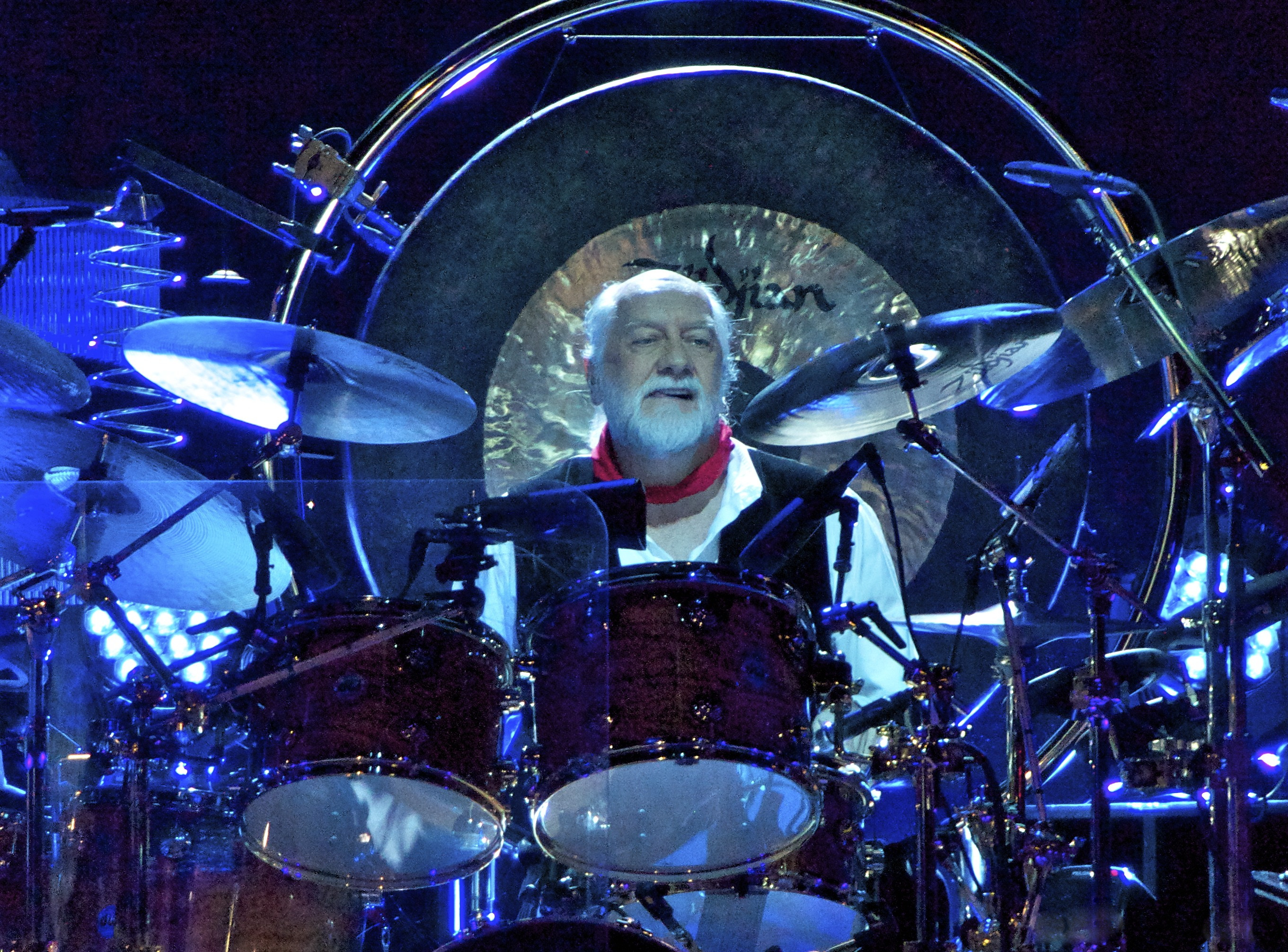
Fleetwood drumming in 2013

Bob Brunning recalled from his early involvement with Fleetwood Mac that Fleetwood was "very open to playing with different people as long as he didn't have to change his style. He was, and is, a completely straightforward drummer, and it works with a lot of different styles. I don't s'pose [sic] he's played a traditional drum solo in his life!" Biographer Carroll highlights this ability as integral to the success of Fleetwood Mac, arguing that Fleetwood was not a virtuoso, but his disciplined and in-distractable manner of play allowed him to hold together a band of strong leading personalities without impinging upon their expression.

Caillat, in contrast, cites Fleetwood as "still one of the most amazing drummers I've ever met. He had his rack of tom drums arranged back to front. Most drummers place them from high to low (in pitch) from their left to right, but Mick chose to place his mid, high, low. I think perhaps this helped him develop his unique style. He hit his drums very hard, except for his kick drum. For some reason, when he played his high hat, it distracted him. He would keep perfect beat with his kick, but he played it so softly that we could hear his mouth noises through his kick mic."

== Personal life ==
Fleetwood has been married to four women and has four children.

In the 1960s, Fleetwood became infatuated with model Jenny Boyd, the younger sister of Pattie Boyd. In June 1970, Fleetwood and Jenny Boyd were married. In 1973, during Fleetwood Mac’s Mystery to Me U.S. tour, Fleetwood discovered that Boyd was having an affair with band member Weston. Fleetwood, after wrestling with the idea of leaving the band, was later critical of his own role in "neglecting" his family. Upon cancelling the remaining Mystery to Me tour, Fleetwood travelled to Zambia to convalesce. Christine McVie, who was also suffering marital problems, travelled with him for part of the journey. Fleetwood and Boyd divorced in 1976.

Boyd and Fleetwood began living together once more in 1976, and temporarily remarried to help their children emigrate from the UK to the US. In November 1977, Fleetwood and Nicks began having an affair. The affair continued sporadically for the next two years until the pair mutually decided to end it. Fleetwood and Boyd's second marriage also ended in divorce. They had two daughters together.

In November 1978, Fleetwood moved into a Bel-Air home with Sara Recor, a mutual friend of Fleetwood and Nicks' who was at the time married to another music producer. Fleetwood married Recor in 1988; the couple divorced in 1995. Fleetwood married Lynn Frankel in 1995. Fleetwood and Frankel had twin daughters who were born in 2002. The couple divorced in 2015. He has been married to his fourth wife, Elizabeth Jordan, since March 2026.

Fleetwood was a heavy cocaine user starting in the 1970s, which continued throughout the 1980s during the making of Fleetwood Mac's Tango in the Night album. Fleetwood quit cocaine cold turkey in the early 1990s with the help of his third wife, Lynn. He became a U.S. citizen on 22 November 2006 in Los Angeles.

Fleetwood has lived in Lahaina, Maui, Hawaii for years. His restaurant and bar called Fleetwood's were lost to the 2023 Hawaii wildfires. He previously owned a restaurant in West Hollywood, California, which closed eight weeks after it opened due to difficulties in securing a liquor license. In 1994, he opened a restaurant/blues club in Alexandria, Virginia.

== Equipment ==
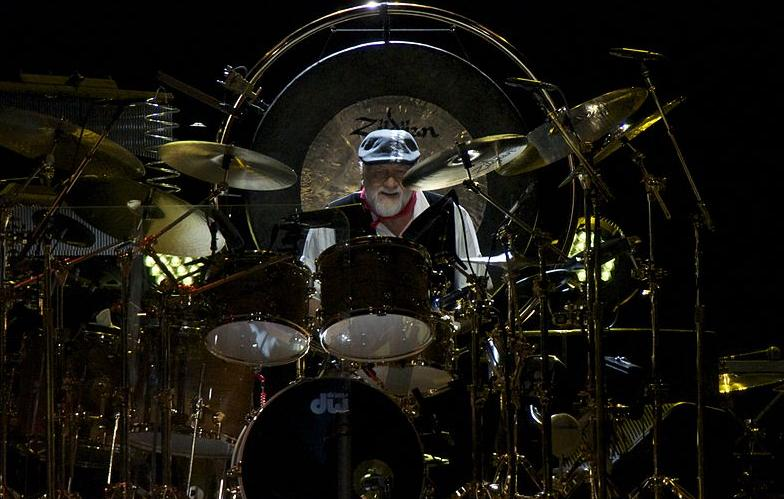
Fleetwood in 2013, surrounded by his extensive drum kit

When he was 15, Fleetwood's parents bought him a Rogers drum kit, which helped him land his first gig as a drummer. During his tenure in Fleetwood Mac, he primarily used Ludwig Drums for live performances and Sonor Drums in the studio. He specifically sought Ludwig drums for their oversized bass drums and tom-toms. By the Tusk tour, Fleetwood dropped both drum kits from his arsenal in favour of Tama Drums. He attributed his pivot to Tama to Ludwig's supposed deterioration in quality and Sonor's inability to produce a bass drum suitable for Fleetwood's large frame. From the 1990s onwards, Fleetwood has been an endorser of Drum Workshop. His drum kit for the Say You Will Tour was made from wood dredged from the bottom of the Great Lakes. All of his drum shells and hardware are coated in 18 carat gold.

Fleetwood had played Paiste cymbals from the late 60s to early 90s, favouring their expressiveness and higher frequencies over Zildjian cymbals. He stopped using Paiste cymbals by 1994 and subsequently switched over to Zildjian.

He also uses Remo drumheads, Easton Ahead 5B Light Rock drumsticks and Latin Percussion. Fleetwood has incorporated many percussion instruments into his drum rig, including a 40 inch Zildjian gong, two rows of wind chimes, and congas.

== Discography ==
=== Studio albums ===
| Year | Album | US | AUS |
|---|---|---|---|
| 1981 | The Visitor | 43 | 80 |

=== Live albums ===
| Year | Album | AUS | Credit |
|---|---|---|---|
| 2008 | Blue Again! | 96 | The Mick Fleetwood Blues Band feat. Rick Vito |
| 2021 | Mick Fleetwood & Friends Celebrate the Music of Peter Green | 35 | Mick Fleetwood & Friends |

=== Mick Fleetwood's Zoo ===
| Year | Album | Credit |
|---|---|---|
| 1983 | I'm Not Me | Mick Fleetwood's Zoo |
| 1992 | Shakin' the Cage | The Zoo |

=== The Mick Fleetwood Band ===
| Year | Album | Credit |
|---|---|---|
| 2004 | Something Big | The Mick Fleetwood Band |

Other

- Total Drumming - sample and loop compilation

== Songwriting credits for Fleetwood Mac ==
Although not a prolific writer, Fleetwood has co-written or written a few songs on Fleetwood Mac's albums.

| Year | Song | Canadian Singles Chart | U.S. Mainstream Rock |
|---|---|---|---|
| 1969 | "Fighting for Madge" (Mick Fleetwood) | - | - |
| 1970 | "Jewel Eyed Judy" (Kirwan, J. McVie, Fleetwood) | - | - |
| 1971 | "The Purple Dancer" (Kirwan, J. McVie, Fleetwood) | - | - |
| 1971 | "What a Shame" (Bob Welch, Kirwan, Christine McVie, J. McVie, Fleetwood) | - | - |
| 1977 | "The Chain" (Buckingham, Stevie Nicks, C. McVie, J. McVie, Fleetwood) | 51 | 30 |
| 1970 (1985) | "On We Jam" (Peter Green, Danny Kirwan, Jeremy Spencer, John McVie, Fleetwood) | - | - |
| 1990 | "Lizard People" (Pete Bardens, Fleetwood) | - | - |
| 1995 | "These Strange Times" (Ray Kennedy, Fleetwood) | - | - |
| 1975 (2004) | "Jam No.2" (Lindsey Buckingham, C. McVie, J. McVie, Fleetwood) | - | - |
| 1977 (2004) | "For Duster (The Blues)" (Buckingham, C. McVie, J. McVie, Fleetwood) | - | - |
| 1977 (2004) | "Mic the Screecher" (Fleetwood) | - | - |

== Filmography ==
=== Film ===
| Year | Title | Role | Notes |
|---|---|---|---|
| 1965 | Mods and Rockers | Drummer | Short |
| 1987 | The Running Man | Mic | |
| 1995 | Zero Tolerance | Helmut Vitch | |
| 1997 | Snide and Prejudice | Pablo Picasso | |
| 1997 | Mr. Music | Simon Eckstal | TV movie |
| 1998 | The Corrs: Live at the Royal Albert Hall | Himself | Special Guest |
| 2001 | Burning Down the House | Bartender | |
| 2011 | Get a Job | Unemployed Band Member | |

=== Television ===
| Year | Title | Role | Notes |
|---|---|---|---|
| 1989 | BRIT Awards | Co-Presenter with Sam Fox | |
| 1989 | Star Trek: The Next Generation | Antedean dignitary | Episode "Manhunt" |
| 1989 | Wiseguy | James Elliot | Episode "And It Comes Out Here" |
| 1997 | Behind the Music | Himself | Episode: "Fleetwood Mac" |
| 2010 | Behind the Music: Remastered | Himself | Episode: "Fleetwood Mac" |
| 2013 | Top Gear | Himself | Series 19 Episode 2 "Star in a Reasonably-Priced Car" |
| 2017 | Diners, Drive-Ins and Dives | Himself | Series 26 Episode 14 |

=== Video games ===
| Year | Title | Voice |
|---|---|---|
| 1996 | You Don't Know Jack Volume 2 | Himself |

== See also ==
- List of celebrities who own wineries and vineyards
