= Yoyo (Bourgeois Tagg album) =

Studio album by Bourgeois Tagg
- Released: September 1987
- Recorded: 1987
- Studios: Studio D Recording, Sausalito; Utopia Sound Studios, Bearsville
- Genres: Rock; synth-pop; funk
- Length: 38:37
- Label: Island Records
- Producer: Todd Rundgren

Bourgeois Tagg chronology
| Bourgeois Tagg (1986) | Yoyo (1987) |

Singles from Yoyo
- 1. "I Don't Mind at All" Released: September 18, 1987; 2. "Waiting for the Worm to Turn" Released: 1987; 3. "Cry Like a Baby" Released: 1988

Yoyo is the second and final album by rock band Bourgeois Tagg, released in September 1987 by Island Records. It was produced by rock musician Todd Rundgren after the bay area band met Rundgren while he was living in Sausalito. After disbanding, several members of the band joined Rundgren for his 1989 album Nearly Human and the accompanying tour.

== Recording ==
The album was recorded at Studio D Recording in Sausalito, CA, and Rundgren's own Utopia Sound Studios in Bearsville, NY, both locations where Rundgren resided at the time. Larry Tagg's brother Eric, a successful musician in his own right, co-wrote on the song "What's Wrong with This Picture".

== Reception ==
Professional ratings
Review scores
| Source | Rating |
|---|---|
| AllMusic | 4.5/5 stars |
| Cash Box | 8.98/10.00 stars |

The album's lead single, "I Don't Mind at All", peaked at No. 38 on the Billboard Hot 100 on December 5, 1987. It was the only single to chart, although two music videos were made and shown on MTV, including one for the second single "Waiting for the Worm to Turn". In a February 26, 1988, Los Angeles Times review by Chris Willman, he called the album "witty, well-crafted pop" and wrote "Whereas once Bourgeois Tagg merely sounded like a funkier, more complicated and more bottom-heavy Toto, now adjectives such as catchy and Beatle-esque (and the somewhat synonymous Squeeze-esque) can happily be applied as well." He also highlighted Rundgren's production ("smooth group harmonies and clever instrumental colorings") and singles out "I Don't Mind at All" as a hit with emotional weight.

== Track listing ==
Side one
| No. | Title | Writer(s) | Length |
|---|---|---|---|
| 1. | "Best of All Possible Worlds" | Larry Tagg | 3:58 |
| 2. | "Cry Like a Baby" | Brent Bourgeois | 3:25 |
| 3. | "Pencil & Paper" | L. Tagg | 4:03 |
| 4. | "Out of My Mind" | Bourgeois | 4:02 |
| 5. | "15 Minutes in the Sun" | L. Tagg, Bourgeois | 3:46 |

Side two
| No. | Title | Writer(s) | Length |
|---|---|---|---|
| 6. | "Waiting for the Worm to Turn" | L. Tagg | 4:02 |
| 7. | "I Don't Mind at All" | Bourgeois, Lyle Workman | 2:33 |
| 8. | "What's Wrong with This Picture" | L. Tagg, Workman, Eric Tagg | 4:23 |
| 9. | "Stress" | Bourgeois, Charlie Peacock | 4:13 |
| 10. | "Coma" | Bourgeois | 4:14 |
| Total length: | | | 38:39 |

== Personnel ==
Credits adapted from the liner notes.

=== Bourgeois Tagg ===
- Brent Bourgeois – keyboards, lead vocals (1–4, 7, 9–10), backing vocals, string arrangements (7)
- Larry Tagg – bass, lead vocals (5–6, 8), backing vocals
- Lyle Workman – guitar, string arrangements (7)
- Scott Moon – keyboards, synthesizers
- Mike Urbano – drums, percussion

==== Additional musicians ====
- Mingo Lewis – percussion (1, 3, 8)
- John Tenney – violin (7, 10)
- Joseph Edelberg – violin (7, 10)
- Rebecca Sebring – viola (7, 10)
- Teressa Adams – cello (7, 10)

=== Technical ===
- Produced and engineered by Todd Rundgren
- Assisant engineer – Jim "Watts" Vereecke
- Cover art – Tony Wright
- Photography – Michael Jang

== Charts ==
| Chart (1987) | Peak position |
|---|---|
| US Billboard 200 | 84 |

Singles

| Year | Single | Chart | Position |
|---|---|---|---|
| 1987 | "I Don't Mind at All" | US Billboard Hot 100 | 38 |
