= Elementary (Cindy Morgan album) =

Studio album by Cindy Morgan
- Released: August 28, 2001
- Studio: Dark Horse Recording and Sound Kitchen (Franklin, Tennessee)
- Genre: CCM
- Length: 46:59
- Label: Word Records
- Producer: Brent Bourgeois; Cindy Morgan

Cindy Morgan chronology
The Best So Far (1999)	Elementary (2001)	Postcards (2006)

Professional ratings
Review scores
Source	Rating
AllMusic	3/5 stars
Crosswalk	B−

Elementary is the seventh album from contemporary Christian music singer Cindy Morgan.

== Track listing ==
All songs written by Cindy Morgan, except where noted.

1. "The World Needs Your Love" – 3:23
2. "Good Thing" (Alex Alzamora, Morgan) – 2:51
3. "Elementary" – 2:48
4. "Love Can" – 4:22
5. "New World" (Morgan, Andrew Ramsey) – 3:31
6. "Believe" (Brent Bourgeois, Morgan) – 3:25
7. "End of the World" (Morgan, Pat McDonald, Tony Nicholas) – 3:12
8. "Walk in the Rain" (Bobby Bluebell, Morgan) – 2:36
9. "Grape Soda" (spoken intro) – 0:19
10. "Sunshine" – 3:43
11. "Happy" (Brian Lenthall, Morgan) – 3:06
12. "Love is Waiting" – 4:04
13. "In These Rooms" – 5:55
14. "I Love You" – 3:43
- Track information and credits taken from the album's liner notes.

== Personnel ==
- Cindy Morgan – lead vocals, backing vocals, acoustic piano, electric piano
- Brent Bourgeois – keyboards, acoustic piano, backing vocals
- Jeff Roach – keyboards, acoustic piano, programming, backing vocals
- Mark Douthit – keyboards, flute, alto saxophone, tenor saxophone, horn arrangements
- Tim Lauer – accordion, harmonica, melodica
- Alex Alzamora – programming
- Pete Kipley – programming
- Andrew Ramsey – electric guitars, acoustic guitars
- Chris Rodriguez – electric guitars, backing vocals
- Larry Tagg – bass guitar
- Craig Nelson – upright bass
- Raymond Boyd – drums
- Jim White – drums, percussion, percussion programming, loops
- Eric Darken – percussion
- Denis Solee – clarinet
- Mike Haynes – trumpet, horn arrangements
- George Tidwell – trumpet
- Tom Howard – string arrangements and conductor
- David Davidson – violin
- Gene Miller – backing vocals

Choir

- Matt Hammon
- Jeremy Jensen
- Sherman Lewis
- David Rice
- Steve Smith

=== Production ===
- Brent Bourgeois – producer, A&R direction
- Cindy Morgan – producer
- Cory Fite – engineer
- David Schober – engineer, mixing
- J.C. Monterrosa – assistant engineer
- Ken Love – mastering at MasterMix (Nashville, Tennessee)
- Linda Bourne Wornell – A&R coordinator
- Chuck Nelson – art direction
- Jeff Jones – design
