= The Loving Kind (Cindy Morgan album) =

Studio album by Cindy Morgan
- Released: March 10, 1998
- Studio: Sound Kitchen (Franklin, Tennessee)
- Genre: CCM
- Length: 49:11
- Label: Word
- Producer: Brent Bourgeois

Cindy Morgan chronology
Listen (1996)	The Loving Kind (1998)	The Best So Far (1999)

Professional ratings
Review scores
Source	Rating
Allmusic	3/5 stars

The Loving Kind is the fifth album from contemporary Christian music singer Cindy Morgan. This concept album chronicles the eight days surrounding the crucifixion of Jesus Christ, as would a Passion play.

== Track listing ==
All songs written by Cindy Morgan, except where noted.

1. "In the Garden" - 2:42
2. "The March" (Morgan, Brent Lenthall) - 3:59
3. "The Loving Kind" - 5:16
4. "The Last Supper" (Morgan, Wes King) - 3:15
5. "Devil Man" - 3:23
6. "Can You Hear Me" - 4:43
7. "The Only Way" - 3:00
8. "Hard Heart" (Morgan, Brent Bourgeois) - 3:27
9. "The Whipping" - 1:34
10. "Higher" (Morgan, Lenthall) - 4:31
11. "Take My Life" - 4:38
12. "Alive and Well" (Morgan, Andrew Ramsey, Michael W. Smith) - 4:25
13. "Praise the King" - 3:52

== Personnel ==
Musicians

- Cindy Morgan – vocals, acoustic piano (1, 5, 6, 10, 13)
- Dennis Patton – additional keyboards (1, 2, 5, 7), loops (2, 9, 12), programming (9, 11, 12), acoustic piano (11), keyboards (11, 12), track arrangements (11)
- Jeff Lisenbee – accordion (1, 2)
- Brent Bourgeois – Wurlitzer electric piano (2, 8), acoustic piano (3, 5, 7), bass (3), vibraphone (3), additional keyboards (5, 11)
- Michael W. Smith – acoustic piano (12)
- Jerry McPherson – guitars (1–3, 5, 7–9, 11–13
- Matt Slocum – guitars (1, 2, 5, 7–9)
- Wes King – guitars (4)
- Larry Tagg – bass (1, 2, 5, 7–9, 11, 13)
- Brent Milligan – bass (12)
- Aaron Smith – drums (1–3, 5, 7–9, 11–13)
- Raymond Boyd – percussion (1–3, 5, 7, 8, 11)
- Mark Douthit – clarinet (1, 7), klezmer arrangements (1), saxophones (2, 8), horn arrangements (2)
- David Davidson – violin (1)
- Tom Howard – string arrangements and conductor (3–6, 9, 10, 12, 13)
- The Nashville String Machine – strings (3–6, 9, 10, 12, 13)

Background vocals

- Cindy Morgan – backing vocals (1–3, 7–9, 11), all vocals (4)
- Brent Bourgeois – backing vocals (1–3, 7, 8)
- Andrew Ramsey – backing vocals (3)
- Nicol Smith – backing vocals (3)
- Wes King – all vocals (4)
- Heather Floyd – backing vocals (7)
- John Elefante – backing vocals (8)
- Craig Hansen – backing vocals (9)

The Loving Kind Choir (Tracks 2, 12 & 13)

- Brent Bourgeois, Sigmund Brouwer, John Elefante, Nikki Hassman, Jody McBrayer, Cindy Morgan, Michael Passons, Allison Pierce, Catherine Pierce, Janna Potter, Chris Rice and Nicol Smith

Additional crowd voices on "The March"

- Lesley Burbridge, Derek Jones and Angie Magill

Children's choir on "Alive and Well"

- Brandon Conger, Megan Dockery, Katy Dunham, Brandon Hargest, Ashley Melling, Emily Webb, Chris White and Matthew White

== Production ==
- Brent Bourgeois – producer, A&R direction
- Craig Hansen – co-producer, engineer, mixing
- Tim Coyle – assistant engineer
- Todd Gunnerson – assistant engineer
- Fred Paragano – assistant engineer
- Matt Weeks – assistant engineer
- Ken Love – mastering at MasterMix (Nashville, Tennessee)
- Linda Bourne Wornell – production assistant
- Beth Lee – art direction
- Chuck Hargett – design, photography
- Mark Smalling – photography
- Michelle Vanderpool – hair, make-up
- Rocketown Artist Services – management
