= Up Against It (disambiguation) =

Up Against It was an unproduced script by Joe Orton, written in 1967.

Up Against It may also refer to:

- Up Against It!, a 1997 album by Todd Rundgren
- Up Against It (1912 film), a romantic comedy directed by Otis Turner
- Up Against It (2026 film), an American romantic comedy film
- Up Against It (album), a 1986 album by The Times
- "Up Against It", a song by Pet Shop Boys from the album Bilingual
