= Andrew Greer =

American singer-songwriter

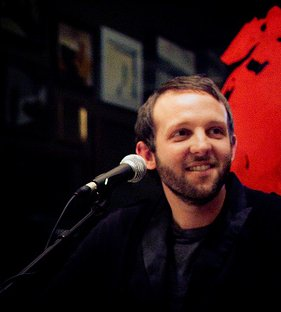

Background information
- Born: Andrew Brooks Greer; July 10, 1982 (age 43); Azle, Texas
- Origin: Nashville, Nashville
- Genres: Americana, folk, folk rock
- Occupations: Singer/Songwriter, Author, TV/Podcast Host
- Years active: 2009–present
- Labels: MA'M Recordings
- Website: www.andrew-greer.com

Andrew Brooks Greer (born July 10, 1982) is a touring independent singer-songwriter and writer living in Nashville, Tennessee.

== Background ==
Greer was born in Azle, Texas, on July 10, 1982, the son of Thomas and Jane Greer (née, Girard), before moving to Nashville, Tennessee to attend Belmont University. After graduating in 2004 with a Bachelor of Music (BM), he worked at Michael W. Smith's Rocketown Records before beginning his own singer-songwriter artist career in 2009 with the release of the record, Open Book, his author career in 2015 with the release of the book Transcending Mysteries, and a podcast and TV show host in 2017 with the release of the show Dinner Conversations with Mark Lowry and Andrew Greer.

== Music career ==
Greer's debut album was awarded 4 out of 5 stars from Christianity Today in a review which called it "an intensely reflective record that digs deep," and 5 out of 5 stars from The Christian Manifesto, which said, "Greer writes with a soul-bearing honesty refreshing to hear in an industry where cliché after cliché comes all too often. Open Book is a masterpiece." Features in CCM Magazine and Christian Musician followed. He was a worship leader for Centrifuge's national student camps in 2011.

Greer released his second album, Angel Band: The Hymn Sessions in 2012.

In the fall of 2012, Greer and singer/songwriter Cindy Morgan fundraised for Food for the Hungry's "Hymns for Hunger" Tour, helping raise awareness and resources for local and international hunger relief organizations at tour stops across the country. The tour has visited cities within the United States and has been featured in performances at the National Religious Broadcasters Convention, the Billy Graham Evangelistic Association, Samaritan's Purse and Amy Grant's "A Tennessee Weekend". In conjunction with the "Hymns for Hunger" tour, Cindy and Andrew were featured on the Winter 2013 cover of Collegiate Magazine.

In the spring of 2013, Greer released All Things Bright & Beautiful: Hymns for the Seasons, an instrumental hymns record. The record hit the #1 position on Nielsen Christian SoundScan's Instrumental Chart for 25 weeks. All Things Bright & Beautiful received a 2013 Gospel Music Association Dove Award nomination for "Instrumental Album of the Year".

In November 2013, Greer released the second installment in his "Angel Band" series with "Angel Band: The Christmas Sessions", including collaborations with Americana and Gospel artists Phil Madeira, The McCrary Sisters, Emily Deloach, his tourmate Cindy Morgan and Sandi Patty. The record reached the Top 10 on iTunes' Singer/Songwriter chart upon release.

In October 2014, Greer produced and arranged "All is Calm, All is Bright: Songs of Christmas", a multi-artist compilation featuring Jaci Velasquez, Sandi Patty, Cindy Morgan, Ginny Owens, Seth and Nirva, American Idol's Melinda Doolittle and R&B superstar Montell Jordan. The project spent six consecutive weeks atop Parable Christian Stores National Retail chart marking Greer's second #1-selling set for the retailer.

On October 23, 2015, Greer released his first live concert project. Filmed in Nashville, Tennessee as a television special, "An Angel Band Christmas LIVE" features gospel music friends Point of Grace, Jaci Velasquez, "Hymns for Hunger" tourmate Cindy Morgan, Nic Gonzales (of the band Salvador) and Women of Faith speaker/author Patsy Clairmont.

== Writing career ==
Greer has published commentaries and editorials in publications like Christianity Today, "In Touch" and ParentLife. Thomas Nelson published his first book in the spring of 2015, Transcending Mysteries: Who is God, and What Does He Want from Us? co-written with Ginny Owens. Greer's second book was Winds of Heaven, Stuff of Earth: Spiritual Conversations Inspired by the Life and Lyrics of Rich Mullins. The collection of essays edited and written by Greer and other contributors, including a foreword by Amy Grant, was published by Worthy Publishing in September 2017 to mark the twentieth anniversary of the death of singer/songwriter Rich Mullins in 1997.

== TV and Podcast Career ==
In the fall of 2017, Andrew Greer and co-host Mark Lowry created and released an audio and video podcast and television show called, Dinner Conversations with Mark Lowry and Andrew Greer. Subtitled "Turning the Light on One Question at a Time," Season One of the podcast featured notable artists and authors Chonda Pierce, Sandi Patty, Russ Taff, Point of Grace, Women of Faith's Patsy Clairmont, Anita Renfroe, Ron Block and many others, in conversations addressing topics like racism, addiction, blended families and adoption. In its first season the show reached #1 on the iTunes Video Podcast Chart (Religion & Spirituality), #7 on the overall Video Podcast chart, and #4 on the Audio Podcast (Religion & Spirituality) chart. In January 2018, the show debuted on nationwide television through a syndication partnership with Cornerstone Television Network.

In 2018, Greer partnered with CCM Magazine to create and host Features on Film with Andrew Greer, filming interviews and exclusive performances with conversational artists and authors.

== Angel Band reception ==
Angel Band: The Hymn Sessions reached #2 on Amazon.com's Hot New Releases in Contemporary Folk chart. Crosswalk.com says "Greer shows that he is a rare breed of artist who has the ability to oscillate between genres effortlessly—contemporary, bluegrass, Americana, inspirational, worship—affording him creativity most artists wish they could pull off," and CCM Magazine adds "Despite the tremendous guest list…Greer's strong vocal styling and impeccable arrangements stand tallest—a testimony to Greer's vision for this hymns project.".

Greer made media appearances on TV shows like "Good Day Dallas" and scored front page features in "The Tennessean" and CCM Magazine.

Greer headlined a national tour, "Under the Radar presents The Angel Band Tour" with Nashville folk singer/songwriter, Julie Lee.

"Angel Band: The Christmas Sessions" received various praises. CCMMagazine.com said, “His richly passionate vocals are just as capable of volleying with the tender Sandi Patty (‘Ave Maria’) or the earthy Cindy Morgan (‘A Cradle in Bethlehem’) as they are hitting a soulful stride next to The McCrary Sisters (‘The Little Drummer Boy’), all while individually earning titles of master interpreter and emotive originator.” While Worship Leader magazine lauds Greer’s collaboration with The McCrary Sisters as “...the most evocative and captivating version of ‘The Little Drummer Boy’ ever...”

The official music video for Greer and Sandi Patty's "Ave Maria" duet premiered nationwide on UP TV in the fall of 2014.

== Discography ==
- 2009: Open Book
- 2012: Angel Band: The Hymn Sessions
- 2013: All Things Bright & Beautiful: Hymns for the Seasons
- 2013: Angel Band: The Christmas Sessions
- 2014: All Is Calm, All Is Bright: Songs Of Christmas]p
- 2015: An Angel Band Christmas LIVE
