= List of new jack swing artists =

Musicians practicing the 1980s R&B-hip hop-dance fusion style

This list contains singers and groups who performed in the new jack swing (or swingbeat) style, a hybrid style popular from the mid-1980s into the early 1990s. It developed as many previous music genres did, by combining elements of jazz, R&B, funk and hip hop. The sound of new jack swing comes from the hip hop "swing" beats created by drum machine and hardware samplers

== Artists ==
- Paula Abdul
- Babyface
- Ricky Bell
- Michael Bivins
- Mary J. Blige
- Toni Braxton
- Bobby Brown
- Tevin Campbell
- Mariah Carey
- Jane Child
- Ronnie DeVoe
- Father MC
- Aretha Franklin (What You See Is What You Sweat era)
- Dr. Freeze
- Doug E. Fresh
- Debbie Gibson
- Johnny Gill
- Jasmine Guy
- Aaron Hall
- Heavy D
- Whitney Houston
- Janet Jackson
- Michael Jackson (Dangerous era)
- DJ Jazzy Jeff
- Jimmy Jam and Terry Lewis
- Montell Jordan
- R. Kelly (early work)
- Johnny Kemp
- Tara Kemp
- Kool Moe Dee
- Joey Lawrence
- Gerald Levert
- MC Hammer
- Epic Mazur (90s work)
- Brian McKnight (early work)
- Cindy Morgan (Real Life era)
- Jeff Redd
- L.A. Reid
- Teddy Riley
- Diana Ross (Workin' Overtime era)
- Raphael Saadiq
- Samuelle
- Tracie Spencer
- Donna Summer (Mistaken Identity era)
- Al B. Sure!
- Keith Sweat
- Tiffany (New Inside era)
- Ralph Tresvant
- Karyn White
- Alyson Williams
- Christopher Williams

== Groups ==
- After 7
- Another Bad Creation
- Bell Biv DeVoe
- Blackstreet
- The Boys
- Boyz II Men
- C+C Music Factory
- Color Me Badd
- Guy
- Heavy D & the Boyz
- Hi-Five
- Immature (On Our Worst Behavior era)
- Jade
- Jodeci
- Joe Public
- L.A. Boyz
- LeVert
- M & M
- Men at Large
- Mint Condition
- New Edition
- New Kids on the Block
- Ol' Skool
- P.M. Dawn
- Portrait
- Public Announcement
- Ready for the World
- The Rude Boys
- Run–D.M.C. (Back from Hell era)
- Special Generation
- Soul for Real
- SWV
- Timex Social Club
- TLC
- Today
- Tony! Toni! Toné!
- Troop
- The Winans (1990s work)
- Wreckx-n-Effect
- 3rd Avenue
