= Listen (Cindy Morgan album) =

Studio album by Cindy Morgan
- Released: November 19, 1996
- Studio: Sound Kitchen and Deer Valley Studio (Franklin, Tennessee); Javelina Recording Studios and re:Think Studio (Nashville, Tennessee)
- Genre: CCM
- Length: 39:31
- Label: Word Records
- Producer: Brent Bourgeois

Cindy Morgan chronology
Under the Waterfall (1995)	Listen (1996)	The Loving Kind (1998)

Professional ratings
Review scores
Source	Rating
Allmusic	4.5/5 stars

Listen is the fourth album from contemporary Christian music singer Cindy Morgan. It was released in 1996 by Word Records. It moved further from dance-pop into a singer-songwriterly vein.

== Track listing ==
All songs written by Cindy Morgan, except where noted.

1. "The Master's Hand" – 3:55
2. "God Is Love" – 3:25
3. "They Say It's Love ('Stars')" – 3:36
4. "Need" – 3:31
5. "Jamie" – 3:01
6. "Listen" (Morgan, Cova Morgan, Andrew Ramsey) – 3:46
7. "The Promise" – 4:10
8. "Lord We Come" – 0:58
9. "Moon Days" (Morgan, Ramsey, Brent Bourgeois, Brent Lenthall) – 3:53
10. "To Fly" – 3:55
11. "Gravity" – 3:42
12. "Will You Be There?" – 1:33

== Trivia ==
- The lyrics to "Listen" were written by Cova Morgan, Cindy's father, in the 70s.Cindy Morgan (1997). *Listen... The Concert: An Evening With Cindy Morgan* (VHS). Nashville: Word Entertainment. OCLC 38742247. 8015334691.

== Personnel ==
- Cindy Morgan – lead vocals, backing vocals, acoustic piano
- Brent Bourgeois – keyboards, additional acoustic piano (3), backing vocals
- Tom Howard – additional keyboards, string arrangements and conductor
- Gordon Kennedy – acoustic guitar, electric guitar, coral electric sitar
- Jerry McPherson – acoustic guitar, electric guitar, banjo, weird sounds
- Andrew Ramsey – acoustic guitar, electric guitar, backing vocals
- Brent Milligan – bass
- Aaron Smith – drums
- Raymond Boyd – percussion
- Brent Lenthall – percussion
- Mark Douthit – clarinets (3), clarinet arrangements (3), saxophones (6)
- Chris McDonald – trombone (6)
- Mike Haynes – trumpet (6)
- The Nashville String Machine – strings
- Molly Felder – backing vocals
- Adrian Bourgeois – additional backing vocals
- Mary Ann Bourgeois – additional backing vocals (8)
- Clay Crosse – additional backing vocals (8)

== Production ==
- Lynn Keesecker – A&R direction
- Brent Bourgeois – producer
- Craig Hansen – co-producer, engineer, mixing
- Tim Coyle – assistant engineer (rhythm tracks), mix assistant
- Joe Hayden – assistant engineer (horns, strings, BGV's)
- Shane D. Wilson – assistant engineer (lead vocals)
- Ken Love – mastering at MasterMix (Nashville, Tennessee)
- Matthew Barnes – photography
- Gina R. Binkley – design
- Christiév Carothers – stylist
- Melanie Shelley – hair, make-up

== Charts ==
Chart (1996)	Peak position
US Top Christian Albums (Billboard)	32
