= The Loving Kind (disambiguation) =

"The Loving Kind" is a song by Girls Aloud.

The Loving Kind may also refer to:

- The Loving Kind (Cindy Morgan album), 1998
- The Loving Kind (Nanci Griffith album), 2009
- The Loving Kind band, which included Noel Redding (bass player for the Jimi Hendrix Experience)
