= Postcards (Cindy Morgan album) =

Studio album by Cindy Morgan
- Released: November 19, 2006
- Studio: The Beanstalk Studio (Franklin, Tennessee); OmniSound Studios (Nashville, Tennessee)
- Genre: CCM
- Length: 44:17
- Label: Reunion Records
- Producer: Wayne Kirkpatrick

Cindy Morgan chronology
Elementary (2001)	Postcards (2006)	Beautiful Bird (2008)

Postcards is the eighth album from Contemporary Christian music singer Cindy Morgan, her first for Reunion Records and her first with producer Wayne Kirkpatrick.

== Track listing ==
All songs written by Cindy Morgan, except where noted.

1. "Deep" (Wayne Kirkpatrick, Morgan) - 4:34
2. "Enough" - 4:03
3. "Postcards" - 3:48
4. "Glory" (Kirkpatrick, Morgan) - 5:05
5. "Where You Are" (Morgan, Andrew Ramsey) - 3:47
6. "Mother" - 3:30
7. "Oh What Love" - 4:22
8. "Eternal Sunshine" (Matthew Gerrard, Morgan) - 4:05
9. "Dig Up" (Kirkpatrick, Morgan) - 3:39
10. "Come Home" (Kirkpatrick, Morgan) - 3:52
11. "The River" - 3:32

== Personnel ==
- Adapted from AllMusic:
- Cindy Morgan – lead vocals, harmony vocals (1, 2, 3, 7, 8), dulcimer (2), acoustic piano (3, 6, 7, 9, 11), backing vocals (4, 5, 8, 9)
- Wayne Kirkpatrick – Wurlitzer electric piano (1, 9), acoustic guitars (1, 3–6, 8–10), kantele (1), backing vocals (2, 5, 9, 10), acoustic piano (4), manditar (4), drum programming (4), electric guitars (5), National guitar (5, 8, 9), pencil guitar (5), harmony vocals (7), melodica (10)
- Gordon Kennedy – electric guitars (1–6, 8, 9), 12-string guitar (1), sitar (1), backing vocals (2, 5), nylon guitar (6), high-strung acoustic guitars (8), electric rhythm guitar (9), ukulele (10)
- Jerry Douglas – Weissenborn guitar (7)
- Chris Donohue – bass (1–6, 8, 9), keyboards (2, 11), upright bass (7, 11), harmonium (7)
- Steve Brewster – drums (1–6, 8, 9), percussion (2, 4)
- Tom Howard – string arrangements (1–3)
- David Davidson – strings (1–3)
- Carole Rabinowitz – strings (1–3)
- Pamela Sixfin – strings (1–3)
- Kristin Wilkinson – strings (1–3)
- Jonathan Yudkin – cello (8)

=== Production ===
- Terry Hemmings – executive producer
- Jason McArthur – A&R
- Wayne Kirkpatrick – producer
- Dan Marnien – engineer, mixing
- Nick Hoag – assistant engineer
- Glenn Spinner – assistant engineer
- Bob Ingison – mix assistant
- Andrew Mendelson – mastering at Georgetown Masters (Nashville, Tennessee)
- D'Ann McAllister – production assistant
- Michelle Box – A&R production
- Marina Chavez – photography
- Stephanie McBrayer – art direction
- Tim Parker – art direction, design
- Debbie Dover – hair, make-up
- Amanda Friedland – stylist
- Thomas Vasquez – management
