= Bourgeois Tagg (album) =

Studio album by Bourgeois Tagg
- Released: March 3, 1986
- Recorded: 1985
- Studios: David J. Holman Studio (Hollywood); Sunset Sound (Hollywood)
- Genres: Rock; synth-pop; funk
- Length: 36:36
- Label: Island Records
- Producer: David J. Holman

Bourgeois Tagg chronology
Bourgeois Tagg (1986)	Yoyo (1987)

Singles from Bourgeois Tagg
- 1. "Mutual Surrender" Released: February 20, 1986; 2. "The Perfect Life" Released: 1986; 3. "Dying to Be Free" Released: 1986

Bourgeois Tagg is the debut studio album by rock band Bourgeois Tagg, released on March 3, 1986, by Island Records. It was produced by David J. Holman, known for working on soundtracks such as Grease and Xanadu.

== Recording ==
After solidifying their lineup with new members Scott Moon and Michael Urbano, the band recorded the album in 1985 at producer David J. Holman's studio in Hollywood. They recorded the basic tracks at Sunset Sound. Original drummer Rick Walter contributed talking drum to "Perfect Life".

== Reception ==
Professional ratings
Review scores
Source	Rating
AllMusic	3.5/5 stars
Cash Box	8.98/10.00 stars

The album spawned two singles. The Tagg-penned "Mutual Surrender (What a Wonderful World)" performed well, if briefly, at college radio and received some dance/club play, but its follow-up "The Perfect Life" did not fare as well. Promotional videos were produced for both singles, but received limited play. "Mutual Surrender" peaked at No. 62 on the US Billboard Hot 100 singles chart on May 17, 1986. The album peaked at No. 139 on the US Billboard 200 albums chart on June 28, 1986.

The album received a retrospective positive review from AllMusic's William Cooper, who called it a combination of "Beatlesque influences with quirky new wave sensibility". He complimented "Mutual Surrender" as "odd, catchy and undeniably pleasing", "The Perfect Life" as "insanely melodic", "Changed" for "amusing but off-putting lyrics", and "Dying to Be Free" for addressing geriatric suicide. However, pop culture reviewer Adam Sobsey calls the album "a klutzy pileup of examples of just about every bad musical trend of a very bad moment in pop music, the mid-'80s", while conceding that "it has good songs, notwithstanding their treatment in the studio" and singles out "Heart of Darkness" for praise.

== Track listing ==
Side one
No.	Title	Writer(s)	Length
1.	"Changed"	Brent Bourgeois	3:39
2.	"The Perfect Life"	Bourgeois	3:42
3.	"Heart of Darkness"	Larry Tagg	3:38
4.	"Body Count"	Bourgeois; Tagg	3:01
5.	"Dying to Be Free"	Bourgeois; Tagg	5:09

Side two
No.	Title	Writer(s)	Length
6.	"Mutual Surrender (What a Wonderful World)"	Tagg	4:25
7.	"The Move Up"	Bourgeois	4:42
8.	"Electric Train"	Tagg	3:34
9.	"Let the War Begin"	Bourgeois	4:46
Total length:			36:36

== Personnel ==
Adapted from the liner notes.

=== Bourgeois Tagg ===
- Brent Bourgeois – keyboards, lead vocals (1, 2, 4–7, 9), backing vocals
- Larry Tagg – bass, lead vocals (3, 8), backing vocals
- Lyle Workman – guitar
- Scott Moon – keyboards, synthesizers
- Mike Urbano – drums, percussion

==== Additional musicians ====
- Rick Walter – talking drum (2)
- Andy Thomas – PPG programming
- Mary Ann Bourgeois – backing vocals
- Ian Matthews – backing vocals

=== Technical ===
- Produced by David J. Holman, Brent Bourgeois, and Larry Tagg
- Engineered by Bill Jackson (at Sunset Sound) and Ray Leonard
- Mixed by David J. Holman at David J. Holman Studio (Hollywood, CA)
- Executive producers – Lionel Conway and Ian Samwell
- Mastered by Steve Hall at Future Disc (Hollywood, CA)
- Art direction – Mike Doud and Larry Tagg
- Cover art – Coral Bourgeois
- Logo – Kate O'Hair
- Photography – Four Eyes
- Direction – Bill Graham

== Charts ==
Chart (1987)	Peak position
US Billboard 200	139

Singles

Year	Single	Chart	Position
1986	"Mutual Surrender"	US Billboard Hot 100	62
