= Bekka Bramlett =

American singer (born 1968)

- Born: Rebekka Ruth Lazone Bramlett; April 19, 1968 (age 57)
- Genres: Rock, pop, country
- Occupations: Singer, songwriter
- Years active: 1973–present
- Formerly of: Fleetwood Mac; Bekka & Billy; Mick Fleetwood's Zoo

Rebekka Ruth Lazone Bramlett (born April 19, 1968) is an American singer. She is the daughter of Delaney and Bonnie Bramlett, of the music duo Delaney & Bonnie. She is a session singer, songwriter, and backing vocalist, working with many artists, including Faith Hill, Robert Plant, Trace Adkins, Faster Pussycat, Buddy Guy, Vince Gill, and Sam Moore.

Bramlett started her recording career at the age of four when she was enlisted to sing background vocals on her father's song, "California Rain". In the 1980s, Bramlett began recording demos and later secured a gig as a backing vocalist for Belinda Carlisle on her 1987 tour. She also befriended Jani Lane of Warrant and later sang on the band's debut solo album, Dirty Rotten Filthy Stinking Rich.

She has been a member of Mick Fleetwood's band the Zoo (1991–1992), Fleetwood Mac (1993–1995), and the country duo Bekka & Billy, with Billy Burnette (1996–1998). She released a solo album of demo work in 2002 for fans who attended her shows.

== Discography ==
=== As featured performer ===
- The Zoo, Shakin' the Cage (1992)
- Fleetwood Mac, Time (1995)
- Bekka & Billy, Bekka & Billy (1996)
- Bekka Bramlett, What's in It for Me (2002)
- Imus Ranch Record, "What Happened?" (2008)
- Bekka Bramlett, I've Got News for You (2009)

=== As backing vocalist ===
- Delaney Bramlett, Mobius Strip (1973)
- Belinda Carlisle, Good Heavens Tour (1988), Runaway Horses (1989)
- Warrant, Dirty Rotten Filthy Stinking Rich (1989)
- Richie Sambora, Stranger in This Town (1991)
- Belinda Carlisle, Her Greatest Hits (1992)
- Faster Pussycat, Whipped! (1992)
- Mitch Malloy, Mitch Malloy (1992)
- Joe Cocker, Have a Little Faith (1994)
- Agnes Stone, Agnes Stone (1994)
- Gregg Wright's Left Hook, Round One (1995)
- Vince Gill, High Lonesome Sound (1996)
- Bad Company, Stories Told & Untold (1996)
- Iris DeMent, The Way I Should (1996)
- Delbert McClinton, One of the Fortunate Few (1997)
- Jonny Lang, Lie to Me (1997)
- Hank Thompson, Hank Thompson and Friends (1997)
- Bryan White, The Right Place (1997)
- Kenny Rogers, Across My Heart (1997)
- Billy Joel, On Tour (1998)
- Jim Horn, The Hit List (1998)
- Paul Craft, Brother Jukebox (1998)
- Buddy Guy, Heavy Love (1998)
- Jonny Lang, Wander This World (1998)
- Travis Tritt, No More Looking Over My Shoulder (1998)
- Delaney Bramlett, Sounds from Home (1998)
- Faith Hill, Faith (1998)
- The Why Store, Two Beasts (1998)
- Rita Coolidge, Thinkin' About You (1998)
- Faith Hill, Live Will Always Win (Australia bonus track) (1999)
- Jason Sellers, Matter of Time (1999)
- Faith Hill, Breathe (1999)
- Michael Peterson, Being Human (1999)
- Claudia Church, Claudia Church (1999)
- Flaco Jimenez, Sleepytown (2000)
- Mark Selby, More Storms Comin' (2000)
- Jamie O'Neal, Shiver (2000)
- Bryan White, Greatest Hits (2000)
- Sonya Isaacs, Sonya Isaacs (2000)
- Lee Ann Womack, I Hope You Dance (2000)
- Billy Burnette, Are You with Me Baby (2000)
- Luke Reed, Corridos (2000)
- Steve Wariner, Faith in You (2000)
- Vince Gill, Let's Make Sure We Kiss Goodbye (2000)
- Jewel, This Way (2001)
- The Derailers, Here Come the Derailers (2001)
- Faith Hill, There You'll Be: The Best of Faith Hill (2001)
- Dwight Yoakam, South of Heaven, West of Hell (2001)
- Hal Ketchum, Lucky Man (2001)
- Rick Ferrell, Different Point of View (2001)
- Bob DiPiero, Laugh (2001)
- T. Graham Brown, Lives (2001)
- Kelly Minter, Good Day (2001)
- Todd Sharp, Walking All the Way (2001)
- Delbert McClinton, Nothing Personal (2001)
- Jessica Andrews, Who I Am (2001)
- Israel & New Breed, Real (2002)
- Faith Hill, Cry (2002)
- Dwight Yoakam, Reprise Please Baby: The Warner Bros. Years (2002)
- Brooks & Dunn, It Won't Be Christmas Without You (2002)
- Tanya Tucker, Tanya (2002)
- Delbert McClinton, Room to Breathe (2002)
- Montgomery Gentry, My Town (2002)
- Shannon Lawson, Chase the Sun (2002)
- Billy Ray Cyrus, Time Flies (2002)
- Amy Grant, Legacy...Hymns & Faith (2002)
- Delaney Bramlett, Sweet Inspiration (2002)
- Jim Lauderdale, Hummingbirds (2002)
- Ashley Cleveland, Second Skin (2002)
- Billy Ray Cyrus, The Other Side (2003)
- The Mavericks, The Mavericks (2003)
- Wynonna Judd, What The World Needs Now Is Love (2003)
- Brooks & Dunn, Red Dirt Road (2003)
- Etta James, Let's Roll (2003)
- Marcel, You, Me, and the Windshield (2003)
- Jeffrey Steele, Gold, Platinum, Chrome and Steele (2003)
- Jessica Andrews, Now (2003)
- Billy Gilman, Music Through Heartsongs: Songs Based on the Poems of Mattie J. T. Stepanek (2003)
- Deanna Carter, I'm Just a Girl (2003)
- Vince Gill, Next Big Thing (2003)
- Andy Griggs, This I Gotta See (2004)
- Jimmy Buffett, License to Chill (2004)
- Brooks & Dunn, Greatest Hits Collection, Vol. 2 (2004)
- Jeffrey Steele, Outlaw (2004)
- Beth Nielsen, Chapman Look (2004)
- Al Anderson, After Hours (2004)
- Montgomery Gentry, You Do Your Thing (2004)
- Curtis Salgado, Strong Suspicion (2004)
- James Otto, Days of Our Lives (2004)
- Lorrie Morgan, Show Me How
- Brooks & Dunn, Very Best of Brooks & Dunn (2004)
- Warrant, Dirty Rotten Filthy Stinking Rich (expanded) (2004)
- Montgomery Gentry, Something to Be Proud Of: The Best of 1999–2005 (2005)
- Trisha Yearwood, Jasper County (2005)
- Jamie Oldaker, Mad Dogs & Okies (2005)
- Delbert McClinton, Cost of Living (2005)
- Neal McCoy, That's Life (2005)
- Bart Millard, Hymned No. (2005)
- Faith Hill, Fireflies (2005)
- Shawn Jones, All in Good Time (2005)
- Van Zant, Get Right with the Man (2005)
- Amy Grant, Rock of Ages...Hymns & Faith (2005)
- Jo Dee Messina, Delicious Surprise (2005)
- Jamie O'Neal, Brave (2005)
- Hacienda Brothers, Hacienda Brothers (2005)
- 3 Doors Down, Seventeen Days (2005)
- LeAnn Rimes, This Woman (2005)
- Spady Branan, The Long Way Around and Other Short Stories (2006)
- Montgomery Gentry, Some People Change (2006)
- Vince Gill, These Days (2006)
- Bob Seger, Face The Promise (2006)
- Sam Moore, Overnight Sensational (2006)
- Trace Adkins, Dangerous Man (2006)
- Eliot Morris, What's Mine Is Yours (2006)
- Albert Lee, Road Runner (2006)
- Bonnie Bramlett, Roots, Blues, & Jazz (2006)
- Sara Groves, Tell Me What You Know (2007)
- Betty Harris, Intuition (2007)
- Faith Hill, Hits (2007)
- Bill Wence, Songs from the Rocky Fork Tavern (2007)
- Lori McKenna, Unglamorous (2007)
- Bryan White, Greatest Hits (2007)
- Kenny Chesney, Just Who I Am: Poets & Pirates (2007)
- Mark McKinney, Get It On (2007)
- Buddy Guy, Skin Deep (2008)
- John Oates, 1000 Miles of Life (2008)
- Robert Plant, Band of Joy (2010)
- Bonnie Tyler, Rocks and Honey (2013)
- John Oates, Another Good Road (2015)
- Monty Byrom, 100 Miles South of Eden (2015)
- Jett Blakk, Rock Revolution (2016)
- Jeff White, Right Beside You (2016)

=== Various Artists/Soundtracks ===
- True Romance Soundtrack (John Waite – In Dreams) (1993)
- Blown Away Soundtrack (Joe Cocker & Bekka Bramlett – Take Me Home) (1994)
- Soccer Rocks The Globe (Fleetwood Mac – Blow By Blow) (1994)
- Stone Country – Country Artists Perform the Songs of the Rolling Stones (1997)
- America's Sweethearts Soundtrack (Bekka Bramlett – We All Fall Down) (2001)
- Hurricane Relief: Come Together Now (2005)

== Filmography ==
- Vanishing Point (1971) as J. Hovah's baby (uncredited)
- Blown Away (1994) (performer: "Take Me Home") duet with Joe Cocker
- America's Sweethearts (2001) (writer: "We All Fall Down") (performer: "We All Fall Down")
- Vertical Limit (2000) (writer: Patient Heart)
- The Real Roseanne Show Herself (1 episode, 2003)
- Fleetwood Mac: Another Link In The Chain (1995) (V) Herself (Vocals)
- Live in Concert Belinda Carlisle (1988) (V) Herself (Background vocals)
