= Fight for My Soul =

Studio album by Jonny Lang
- Released: September 2, 2013
- Studio: House of Blues Studios; Platinum Lab; Lyricanvas; Robot Lemon; Watershed Studio
- Length: 55:39
- Label: Concord
- Producer: Jonny Lang; Tommy Sims

Jonny Lang chronology
Turn Around (2006)	Fight for My Soul (2013)	Signs (2017)

Professional ratings
Review scores
Source	Rating
AllMusic	4/5 stars
PopMatters	8/10

Fight for My Soul is the sixth studio album by American musician Jonny Lang. It was released on September 2, 2013, through Concord Records. Recording sessions took place at House of Blues Studios, Platinum Lab, Lyricanvas, Robot Lemon and Watershed Studio. Production was handled by Lang himself together with Tommy Sims.

The album peaked at number 50 on the Billboard 200, number 2 on the Top Christian Albums, number 20 on the Top Rock Albums, number 25 on the Tastemaker Albums and topped the Blues Albums charts in the United States. It also reached number 54 on the Swiss Hitparade and number 44 on the UK Official Independent Albums Chart.

== Track listing ==
No.	Title	Writer(s)	Length
1.	"Blew Up (The House)"	Jon Gordon Langseth, Jr.; Tommy Sims	4:42
2.	"Breakin' In"	Langseth, Jr.; Sims; Matt Ridenour	3:36
3.	"We Are the Same"	Langseth, Jr.; Sims	5:59
4.	"What You're Looking For"	Langseth, Jr.; Michael Logen	5:45
5.	"Not Right"	Langseth, Jr.; Sims	4:33
6.	"The Truth"	Langseth, Jr.; Sims	5:08
7.	"River"	Langseth, Jr.; Sims	4:13
8.	"Fight for My Soul"	Langseth, Jr.; Sims	4:58
9.	"All of a Sudden"	Langseth, Jr.; Drew Ramsey; Shannon Sanders	4:42
10.	"Seasons"	Langseth, Jr.; Sims	5:00
11.	"I'll Always Be"	Langseth, Jr.; Sims	7:03
Total length:			55:39

== Charts ==
Chart (2013)	Peak position
Swiss Albums (Schweizer Hitparade)	54
UK Independent Albums (OCC)	44
US Billboard 200	50
US Top Christian Albums (Billboard)	2
US Top Rock Albums (Billboard)	20
US Top Blues Albums (Billboard)	1
US Indie Store Album Sales (Billboard)	25
