= Under the Waterfall =

Under The Waterfall

Studio album by Cindy Morgan
- Released: January 1, 1995
- Studio: Great Circle Sound and The Rec Room (Nashville, Tennessee); Focus on the Family (Colorado Springs, Colorado)
- Genre: CCM
- Length: 49:42
- Label: Word Records
- Producer: Mark Hammond

Cindy Morgan chronology
A Reason to Live (1993)	Under The Waterfall (1995)	Listen (1996)

Professional ratings
Review scores
Source	Rating
Allmusic	2/5 stars

Under The Waterfall is the third album from Contemporary Christian music singer Cindy Morgan. It was released in 1995 by Word Records.

Renowned singer/pianist Michael W. Smith plays keyboards on the song "I'll Stand".

== Track listing ==
=== His Sweet Embrace ===
1. "Prelude To Grace" (Morgan) - 0:45
2. "Sweet Days of Grace" (Morgan, Mark Hammond) - 3:59
3. "Painted a Rainbow" (Morgan, Hammond, Kip Raines) - 5:20
4. "Reaching With His Love" (Geoff and Becky Thurman, Doyle Tallent) - 4:56
5. "Golden Rain" (Morgan) - 4:24
6. "I Know You" (Morgan) - 4:38
7. "Miracle In The Making" (Morgan) - 4:31

=== Pathway of Pain ===
1. "Delilah" (Morgan, Hammond) - 4:06
2. "Oh, How The Angels Are Falling" (Bob DeMoss) - 0:52
3. "Angels Falling" (Morgan, Hammond) - 6:01
4. "Last Days" (Morgan) - 4:06

=== Love's Refrain ===
1. "I'll Stand" (Morgan, Hammond, Tommy Sims) - 4:04
2. "Love's Sweet Name" (Morgan, Hammond) - 3:37

== Personnel ==
- Cindy Morgan – lead vocals (2–8, 10–13), backing vocals (2–4, 7, 8, 10), additional acoustic piano (7)
- John Andrew Schneider – acoustic piano (1, 6, 11, 13), keyboards (11)
- Mark Hammond – keyboards (2–4, 6–8, 10, 12), bass (2, 3, 6–8, 10, 12), drums (2–8, 10, 12), backing vocals (3, 7), effects (9)
- Phil Madeira – Hammond B3 organ (3, 4, 12)
- Tommy Sims – acoustic piano (3), bass (4, 5)
- Brian Green – acoustic piano (4)
- Keith Thomas – keyboards (5), string arrangements (5)
- Michael W. Smith – acoustic piano (12)
- Dann Huff – guitars (3, 4, 12)
- Tom Hemby – guitars (6)
- David Hamilton – string orchestration and conductor (5, 13), string arrangements (13)
- The Nashville String Machine – strings (5, 13)
- Brent Barcus – backing vocals (2)
- Cheryl Rogers – backing vocals (4)
- Nicol Smith – backing vocals (4, 5, 10)
- Michael Mellett – backing vocals (5, 6)
- Celeste Hammond – backing vocals (6)
- Kip Raines – backing vocals (10)
- Andy Sutherland – vocal solo (10)

Voices on "Oh, How The Angels Are Falling

- Bob DeMoss, Magdeline Hammond, Suzzanne Maranic and Lois Smith

Choir on "I'll Stand"

- Angelo Petrucci, Veronica Petrucci, Cheryl Rogers, Shannon Sanders and Nicol Smith

=== Production ===
- John Mays – executive producer
- Mark Hammond – producer
- Ronnie Brookshire – engineer
- Dave Dillbeck – engineer
- Todd Robbins – engineer, mix assistant
- Bill Whittington – additional engineer
- Dave Arnold – vocal recording (Track 9)
- Tony Peluso – mixing at Sixteenth Avenue Sound (Nashville, Tennessee)
- Pete Martinez – mix assistant
- Ronnie Thomas – editing at MasterMix (Nashville, Tennessee)
- Steve Hall – mastering at Future Disc (North Hollywood, California)
- Brent Lenthall – production assistant
- Diana Barnes – art direction
- Ilene Weingard – design
- Michael Haber – photography
- Mike Atkins – management
