= Bows & Arrows =

Bows & Arrows may refer to:

- Bows & Arrows (album), a 2015 album by Cindy Morgan
- Bows + Arrows, a 2004 album by The Walkmen
- "Bows & Arrows", a song by Kaiser Chiefs from the album Education, Education, Education & War

== See also ==
- Bow and arrow, a projectile weapon system
