= Bows & Arrows (album) =

Studio album by Cindy Morgan
- Released: September 4, 2015
- Genre: Worship, CCM, folk, bluegrass, country gospel
- Length: 51:09
- Label: Lucid Artist
- Producer: Cindy Morgan; Kyle Buchanan

Cindy Morgan chronology
Hymns: Some Glad Morning (2010)	Bows & Arrows (2015)

Bows & Arrows is the tenth studio album by Cindy Morgan. Lucid Artist released the album on September 4, 2015.

== Critical reception ==
Andy Argyrakis, awarding the album four stars at CCM Magazine, describes, "Bows & Arrows is far from a sleeper, but rather shoots straight for the heart." Reviewing the album for Breathecast, Justin Sarachik writes, "it feels like a reflection of her life transposed from the book to music." Andrew Greenhalgh, writing a review from Soul-Audio, states, "Bows & Arrows...doesn't waver, delivering a musical backdrop that is engaging throughout while the artist’s rich stories will have listeners coming back again and again, peeling back the layers with each listen." Indicating in a review at Hallels, Timothy Yap describes, "what we have is an earthy, rugged, and at times tattered sound. Nevertheless, this album is real, honest, and Morgan's best." Grace Thorson, rating the album two and a half stars at CM Addict, describes, "The lyrics were well-conceived, but I needed something more to keep my interests engaged...the music tends to blend in a tad with the others."

== Track listing ==
All tracks are written by Cindy Morgan.

Track list
No.	Title	Length
1.	"Breaking Heart"	3:59
2.	"Can't Help Yourself" (featuring Gabe Dixon & Sierra Hull)	4:27
3.	"I Know You" (featuring Andrew Greer)	3:46
4.	"Bows & Arrows"	5:01
5.	"Wandering Child"	4:18
6.	"Unbroken"	5:33
7.	"Do You Know Jesus" (featuring Jonathan Kingham)	5:00
8.	"The Sound of a Train"	4:31
9.	"I Want to Live"	0:49
10.	"In the Red"	3:56
11.	"Bring Balloons"	4:41
12.	"How Could I Ask for More" (featuring Andrew Peterson)	4:00
13.	"I Want to Live Part 2"	1:08
Total length:		51:09
