= Smokin (Jonny Lang album) =

Studio album by Jonny Lang
- Released: 1995
- Recorded: 1995
- Genre: Blues
- Length: 44:10
- Label: Oarfin
- Producer: Mike Bullock

Jonny Lang chronology
| Smokin (1995) | Lie To Me (1997) |

Professional ratings
Review scores
| Source | Rating |
|---|---|
| Allmusic | 2.5/5 stars |
| The Penguin Guide to Blues Recordings | 2.5/4 stars |

Smokin is the debut album by American blues guitarist Jonny Lang, independently released in 1995 under the name "Kid Jonny Lang" with his then-band "The Big Bang", together as Kid Jonny Lang & The Big Bang. The album was later remastered and reissued in 2002 by Eagle Records with an alternative album cover.

== Track listing ==
Smokin' track listing
| No. | Title | Writer(s) | Length |
|---|---|---|---|
| 1. | "Louise" | Jonny Lang; Jon Langseth | 4:21 |
| 2. | "Changes" | Ted Larsen | 3:15 |
| 3. | "Lovin' My Baby" | Lang | 3:07 |
| 4. | "I Love You the Best" | Lang | 4:01 |
| 5. | "Nice & Warm" | Tab Benoit | 7:40 |
| 6. | "It's Obdacious" | Buddy Johnson | 3:16 |
| 7. | "Sugarman" | Jeff Hayes | 4:12 |
| 8. | ""E" Train" | Michael Rey Larsen; T. Larsen | 4:08 |
| 9. | "Too Tired" | Albert Collins | 3:12 |
| 10. | "Smokin'" | Lang; M. Larsen | 3:43 |
| 11. | "Malted Milk" | Robert Johnson | 3:15 |
| Total length: | | | 44:10 |

== Personnel ==
Credits adapted from the album's liner notes.

- "Kid" Johnny Lang – vocals, guitar
- Ted "Lightnin' Boy" Larsen – guitars, backing vocals
- Michael Rey Larsen – drums, backing vocals
- Jeff Hayes – bass guitar, backing vocals
- Dave Ferreira – keyboard ("Nice & Warm", "It's Obdacious", "Sugarman" and "Too Tired")
- Jenny Thom – backing vocals ("Louise", "It's Obdacious" and ""E" Train")
- Marcia Langseth – backing vocals ("Louise", "It's Obdacious" and ""E" Train")
- Mike Bullock – producer, engineer, harp on "Lovin' My Baby", saxophone on "It's Obdacious", backing vocals on ""E" Train"
- Kirk Moseley – engineer
- Jon Langseth – personal manager

== See also ==
- 1995 in music
