= Bourgeois Tagg =

American band

- Bourgeois Tagg in 1987. This is the full image used on the cover of their album Yoyo.

Background information
- Origin: Sacramento, California, U.S.
- Genres: Rock; synth-pop; funk
- Years active: 1984–1989, 2008
- Label: Island Records
- Past members: Brent Bourgeois; Larry Tagg; Lyle Workman; Michael Urbano; Scott Moon; Rick Walter (1984)

Bourgeois Tagg was an American pop rock band headed by Brent Bourgeois and Larry Tagg and featuring guitarist Lyle Workman, drummer Michael Urbano, and keyboardist Scott Moon. The band is most remembered for their hit song "I Don't Mind at All" from their 1987 album, Yoyo.

== Formation ==
Larry Tagg and Brent Bourgeois moved from Dallas to California's Bay Area, and in the late 1970s they played in a Sacramento band called Uncle Rainbow, which included members from Texas and other parts of the South. In 1984, Bourgeois and Tagg moved to Sacramento and formed Bourgeois Tagg with Workman and drummer Rick Walter. Bourgeois played keyboards, Tagg played bass, and both shared lead vocal duties.

== Career success ==
=== Eponymous debut album ===
With a lineup of Bourgeois, Tagg, Workman, Michael Urbano and Scott Moon, the band released the album Bourgeois Tagg in 1986. It was produced by David J. Holman and spawned two singles. The Tagg-penned "Mutual Surrender (What a Wonderful World)" performed well, if briefly, at college radio and received some dance/club play, but its follow-up "The Perfect Life" did not fare as well. Promotional videos were produced for both singles, but received limited play. "Mutual Surrender" peaked at number 62 on the U.S. Billboard Hot 100 singles chart.

The album received a retrospective positive review from Allmusic's William Cooper, who called it a combination of "Beatlesque influences with quirky new wave sensibility". He complimented "Mutual Surrender" as "odd, catchy and undeniably pleasing" and "Perfect Life" as "insanely melodic", and he also picked out "Changed" for "amusing but off-putting lyrics" and "Dying to Be Free" for addressing geriatric suicide. However, pop culture reviewer Adam Sobsey calls the album "a klutzy pileup of examples of just about every bad musical trend of a very bad moment in pop music, the mid-'80s", while conceding that "it has good songs, notwithstanding their treatment in the studio" and singles out "Heart of Darkness" for praise. The album reached a modest number 139 on Billboard's Top Pop Albums album chart.

=== Yoyo ===
In 1987, the five members of Bourgeois Tagg recorded Yoyo with producer Todd Rundgren. The album reached no. 84 on the Top Pop Albums chart.

The first single gave the band had what would prove to be their biggest hit: "I Don't Mind at All", written by Workman and Bourgeois. The song is an acoustic ballad that is called "phenomenally pretty" and "achingly sad" by English music critic James Masterton, who opined that its "shimmering string section" harked to classic Beatles songs such as "Yesterday" and "Across the Universe" and placed "its heart and soul firmly in the 1960s". In 2024, reviewer Sobsey called it "the showstopper" of the album and "the 'inevitable song'—a simple, plaintive, folkish breakup ballad built around [Workman's] acoustic guitar track" that "adds decorative percussion and deftly incorporated strings" as it progresses. He notes that "nearly four decades since it hit the airwaves, [it] still sounds like the from-the-heart classic it seemed like it would be in 1987."

The single of "I Don't Mind at All" peaked at number 38 on the Billboard Hot 100, number 35 on the UK Singles Chart, number 35 on Canada's RPM singles chart number 35 on UK's Official Charts, and number 83 in the Netherlands. Although the single just briefly made the top 40 in the United States, it was a number five hit on the Adult Contemporary chart and a number 8 hit on the Album Rock Tracks chart. Its success was fueled by an innovative video directed by David Fincher that received heavy airplay on MTV and other music video outlets.

The follow-up single "Waiting for the Worm to Turn" (the first single with a lead vocal by Tagg) failed to chart in the U.S., as did the third single "Cry Like a Baby".

== Dissolution and aftermath ==
During his time in the band, Bourgeois struggled with addiction to drugs and alcohol. When fellow musician and drinking buddy Charlie Peacock began going to church, Bourgeois followed and became a Christian. Latent conflicts became exacerbated by Bourgeois' trend toward Christian lyrics and the band split in 1989 while working on a third album. Three band members appear on Rundgren's 1989 album Nearly Human, and they toured as part of Rundgren's backing band.

After Bourgeois Tagg split up, Bourgeois released a self-titled album in 1990 that spawned a U.S. top-40 hit with the single "Dare to Fall in Love". From the mid-1990s, he has worked as a contemporary Christian music songwriter and producer. In 2014, Bourgeois released another pop album, Don't Look Back, which featured Tagg on the song "Psycho".

Tagg continued to tour with Rundgren (until 1995), released two solo albums, and worked as a songwriter in the 1990s. He later became a high school teacher and an author of books on the American Civil War.

Workman went on to a career as a film soundtrack composer and bandleader, while Urbano drummed with John Hiatt and later joined Smash Mouth.

The band reunited in 2008 for a concert at the Crest Theatre in their native Sacramento. The concert was a fundraiser for a kidney transplant for former Uncle Rainbow vocalist Richard Oates (their first incarnation). Bourgeois and Tagg both performed with other band members in 2012 as part of "Lost 80's Live".
