= Lie to Me (album) =

Studio album by Jonny Lang
- Released: January 28, 1997
- Recorded: 1996
- Genre: Blues
- Length: 50:55
- Label: A&M
- Producer: David Z

Jonny Lang chronology
Smokin (1995)	Lie to Me (1997)	Wander This World (1998)

Professional ratings
Review scores
Source	Rating
AllMusic	3/5 stars
The Penguin Guide to Blues Recordings	3.5/4 stars

Lie to Me is the second studio album by the American blues guitarist Jonny Lang, released on January 28, 1997. It is Lang's big-label debut, released a day before his 16th birthday.

== Track listing ==
All songs produced and engineered by David Rivkin.

Lie to Me track listing
No.	Title	Writer(s)	Length
1.	"Lie to Me"	Bruce McCabe; David Rivkin	4:14
2.	"Darker Side"	McCabe	5:10
3.	"Good Morning Little School Girl"	Unknown	4:15
4.	"Still Wonder"	Kevin Bowe	3:45
5.	"Matchbox"	Ike Turner	3:30
6.	"Back for a Taste of Your Love"	Brenda Johnson; Darryl Carter; Syl Johnson	3:32
7.	"A Quitter Never Wins"	Margaret Simpson; Tinsley Ellis	5:57
8.	"Hit the Ground Running"	Jeff Silbar; Michael Lunn	3:31
9.	"Rack 'Em Up"	McCabe	4:08
10.	"When I Come to You"	Dennis Morgan; Jonny Lang	4:59
11.	"There's Gotta Be a Change"	Gwendolyn Collins	4:11
12.	"Missing Your Love"	Morgan; Lang	3:54
Total length:			51:06

== Personnel ==
- Jonny Lang - vocals, lead guitar
- Bruce McCabe - piano, clavinet, backing vocals
- Bekka Bramlett - backing vocals
- Billy Franze - rhythm guitar
- Dennis Morgan - acoustic guitar
- Doug Bartenfeld - rhythm guitar
- Rob Stupka - drums
- David Smith - bass guitar
- Tom Tucker - engineer
- Mark Pagliaro - Guitar Tech

== Charts ==
=== Weekly charts ===
Chart (1997)	Peak position
Australian Albums (ARIA)	98
French Albums (SNEP)	67
German Albums (Offizielle Top 100)	11
Swedish Albums (Sverigetopplistan)	58
Swiss Albums (Schweizer Hitparade)	38
US Billboard 200	44

=== Year-end charts ===
Chart (1997)	Position
US Billboard 200	124
