= Wander This World =

Studio album by Jonny Lang
- Released: October 20, 1998
- Recorded: 1998
- Studio: Seedy Underbelly Studios and Oarfin Studios, Minneapolis, MN; Sound Kitchen, Nashville, TN
- Genre: Blues, blue-eyed soul, blues-rock, funk
- Length: 52:52
- Label: A&M
- Producer: David Z

Jonny Lang chronology
Lie To Me (1997)	Wander This World (1998)	Long Time Coming (2003)

Professional ratings
Review scores
Source	Rating
AllMusic	4/5 stars
Artistdirect.com	4/5 stars
Rolling Stone	3/5 stars
The Penguin Guide to Blues Recordings	3.5/4 stars

Wander This World is the third studio album by American blues guitarist Jonny Lang, released in 1998, when he was 17. The album was recorded at Seedy Underbelly Studios, Oarfin Studios in Minneapolis, and the Sound Kitchen in Nashville. This album produced Lang's first Grammy nomination.

The album contains a mix of genres; some tracks are blues, while others are Southern-style soul, funk, or rock with a blues feel. "Angel of Mercy" and Luther Allison's "Cherry Red Wine" are twelve-bar blues; "Walking Away" and "Second Guessing" are similar to 1960s Memphis soul; and "The Levee" and "Still Rainin'" are more rock-orientated.

Reviewer Alex Henderson commented on how mature the 17-year-old Lang sounded, saying the album often sounded like it could be the work of a 30-year-old.

== Track listing ==
1. "Still Rainin'" (Bruce McCabe) – 4:49
2. "Second Guessing" (David Z/McCabe) – 5:10
3. "I Am" (Prince/Z/Levi Seacer, Jr.) – 5:04
4. "Breakin' Me" (Lang/Kevin Bowe) – 4:32
5. "Wander This World" (Paul Diethelm/McCabe) – 4:49
6. "Walking Away" (Lang/Jerry Lynn Williams) – 4:14
7. "The Levee" (Bowe/Lang) – 3:41
8. "Angel of Mercy" (McCabe/Mike Henderson) – 4:30
9. "Right Back" (Williams/Danny Kortchmar) – 3:59
10. "Leaving to Stay" (Bowe) – 4:35
11. "Before You Hit the Ground" (Bowe/Lang) – 3:55
12. "Cherry Red Wine" (Luther Allison) – 3:31
13. "If This is Love" (Joe Louis Walker) – 3:01

== Personnel ==
- Jonny Lang – vocals, lead guitar
- Richie Hayward – drums
- David Smith – bass
- Jack Holder – rhythm guitars, keyboards
- Steve Cropper – guitars
- Paul Diethelm – dobro on "Wander This World"
- Kevin Bowe – rhythm guitar on "The Levee"
- Tommy Burroughs – acoustic guitar on "Walking Away", background vocals on "Right Back"
- Jessica Boucher – background vocals on "Still Raining" & "I Am"
- Bekka Bramlett – background vocals on "Still Raining" & "I Am"
- Bruce McCabe – keyboards
- Ricky Peterson – keyboards
- Jimmy Davis – background vocals on "Right Back"
- Eric Leeds – saxophone on "I Am"
- Tom Tucker – engineer
