= Nearly Human =

Studio album by Todd Rundgren
- Released: May 18, 1989
- Recorded: June 26, 1988 – February 6, 1989
- Studios: Fantasy (Berkeley); The Plant (Sausalito)
- Genres: Rock; soul
- Length: 53:02
- Label: Warner Bros.
- Producer: Todd Rundgren

Todd Rundgren chronology
A Cappella (1985)	Nearly Human (1989)	2nd Wind (1991)

Alternative Cover
- Japanese Edition Artwork

Nearly Human is the twelfth studio album by American musician Todd Rundgren, released on May 18, 1989, by Warner Bros. Records. It was his first release in four years, although he had been active as a producer in the intervening years. Many of the album's songs deal with loss, self-doubt, jealousy and spiritual recovery. It was also the first collaboration between Rundgren and Michele Gray, a singer and ex-model who helped to organize the sessions. Gray sang backing vocals, both on the record and on subsequent tours, and the pair later married.

== Recording ==
The song "Parallel Lines" was originally written for Rundgren's musical theater Off Broadway production of Joe Orton's Up Against It. The original version is rather slow and can be found on Rundgren's Japan-only album, Up Against It! The song was re-recorded here with an uptempo and lusher arrangement.

Unlike a large portion of Rundgren's solo albums on which he played all the instruments and sang all lead and backing vocals, Nearly Human was performed live in the studio with numerous musicians, including the members of Rundgren's defunct band Utopia which had broken up three years earlier; Roger Powell, Kasim Sulton and John "Willie" Wilcox all play on the track "Can't Stop Running". Scott Mathews and the former The Tubes members Vince Welnick (keyboards) and Prairie Prince (drums) also perform on Nearly Human. The track "Feel It" was originally recorded (with slightly different lyrics) by the San Francisco band on its 1985 album Love Bomb, produced by Rundgren. Brent Bourgeois and Larry Tagg of Bourgeois Tagg, whom Rundgren had produced, also played on the album along with the rest of the band, making Nearly Human effectively a Rundgren-Utopia-Bourgeois Tagg-Tubes collaboration, plus extra vocalists and keyboard players.

== Reception ==
Professional ratings
Review scores
Source	Rating
AllMusic	4/5 stars
Classic Rock	7/10 stars
Hi-Fi News & Record Review	A/B:1
Rolling Stone	4/5 stars

Nearly Human received very favorable reviews. The album's single, "The Want of a Nail", featuring the soul legend Bobby Womack, was Rundgren's last charting Billboard single. One other single was released "Parallel Lines" B/W "I Love My Life" but did not chart. Andrew Martin, reviewer of British music newspaper Music Week, praised the album by saying "Todd Rundgren forays into making his own albums are rarer these days, but when they do arrive they tend to be slick, taut affairs which exude class. This is no exception." In the end Martin said: "From the delicious horn-tinged overdrive of 'The Want of a Nail' to the strident bass-lead 'Unloved Children' it demonstrates a man cable of delving into a myriad of rock styles without floundering." In review of 10 June 1989 David Spodek of RPM, named this album "a welcome return." He wrote: "This is radio-tailored pop at its best, with material that will fit both AOR and NC formats" and summarized that "this LP should be a winner on radio and in the stores, provided it is backed with the right promotion in order to attract a new legion of fans to Rundgren's sound."

== Japanese release ==
For the Japanese release of the album, the sixth finger of the handprint on the cover was removed, "due to the religious significance of six fingers in Japan".

== Track listing ==
=== CD issue ===
All tracks are written by Todd Rundgren, unless otherwise noted.

No.	Title	Writer(s)	Length
1.	"The Want of a Nail"		5:14
2.	"The Waiting Game"		4:16
3.	"Parallel Lines"		4:22
4.	"Two Little Hitlers"	Elvis Costello	3:55
5.	"Can't Stop Running"		5:00
6.	"Unloved Children"		4:03
7.	"Fidelity"		4:39
8.	"Feel It"	Rundgren, The Tubes, Lorie Welnick	5:47
9.	"Hawking"		6:51
10.	"I Love My Life"		8:55

=== LP issue ===
The LP release had a slightly different track list and did not include "Two Little Hitlers".

Side one
No.	Title	Length
1.	"The Want of a Nail"	5:14
2.	"The Waiting Game"	4:16
3.	"Parallel Lines"	4:22
4.	"Unloved Children"	4:03
5.	"Can't Stop Running"	5:00

Side two
No.	Title	Writer(s)	Length
6.	"Fidelity"		4:39
7.	"Feel It"	Rundgren, The Tubes, Welnick	4:39
8.	"Hawking"		6:51
9.	"I Love My Life"		8:55

== Personnel ==
=== Musicians ===
- Todd Rundgren – lead vocals (all tracks), guitar (6), arranger (all tracks)
- Lyle Workman – guitar (1–7, 9, 10)
- Vernon Black – guitar (5, 8, 9)
- Larry Tagg – bass guitar (1–4, 10), backing vocals (5, 6, 9)
- Kasim Sulton – bass guitar (5)
- Rick Anderson – bass guitar (6)
- Randy Jackson – bass guitar (8, 9)
- Brent Bourgeois – Hammond organ (4), synthesizer (3, 5, 7, 9), backing vocals (1, 2, 6)
- Vince Welnick – piano (1), digital piano (1–3, 6, 8), accordion (4), synthesizer (5)
- Byron Allred – synthesizer (2), piano (9)
- Nate Ginsberg – synthesizer (3, 7), piano (10)
- Scott Moon – synthesizer (3)
- Roger Powell – synthesizer (5)
- Jimmy Pugh – Hammond organ (6, 10)
- Mingo Lewis – congas (5)
- Michael Pluznick – shaker (5), congas (7–9)
- Gary Yost – tambourine (1, 6)
- Ralph Legnini – tambourine (5)
- Willie Wilcox – drums (5)
- Michael Urbano – drums (1–4, 6, 7, 9, 10), timbales (5)
- Prairie Prince – percussion (3), electronic drums (5), drums (8)
- Barbara Imhoff – harp (1)
- Bobby Strickland – tenor saxophone (1, 4, 8, 9), baritone saxophone (6), flute (7)
- Peter Apfelbaum – clarinet (7)
- Jim Blinn – trombone (1)
- Bruce Paine – trombone (8)
- Mike Rose – trumpet (1, 8)
- Paul Shaghoian – trumpet (4)
- Bobby Womack – co-lead vocals (1)
- Vicki Randle, Jeanie Tracy – backing vocals (1, 10)
- N.D. Smart – backing vocals (1, 2, 7, 8)
- Michele Gray – backing vocals (1–3, 5–8, 10)
- Scott Mathews – backing vocals (2, 3, 6–8, 10)
- Keta Bill – backing vocals (2, 3, 9)
- Melisa Kary – backing vocals (2, 3, 10)
- Kim Cataluna, Cary Sheldon – backing vocals (2, 5–8, 10)
- Skyler Jett – backing vocals (2, 9, 10)
- John Hampton – backing vocals (3)
- Annie Stocking – backing vocals (3, 9)
- Mary Lou Arnold, Bill Spooner – backing vocals (5)
- Bryan Thym – backing vocals (5, 9, 10)
- Shandi Sinnamon – backing vocals (7, 8, 10)
- Raz Kennedy – backing vocals (9)
- Clarence Clemons, Daymon Cooper, Vince Ebo, Shirley Faulkner, Emma Jean Foster, Paul Gilbert, Derick Hughes, Eric Martin, Kelly Moneymaker, Jenni Muldaur, Charles Reed, Paul Scott – backing vocals (10)
- Dean Franke, Roberta Freier, Stephen Gehl, Nathan Rubin – strings (1)
- Paul Brancato, John Tenney – strings (1, 8)
- Stefan Hersh – strings (8)
- The Dick Bright Strings – strings (8)
- Narada Michael Walden – choirmaster (10)

=== Technical ===
- Produced by Todd Rundgren
- Engineers – Michael Rosen (1, 2, 5–10), Rob Beaton (3), Tom Size (4), Richard McKernan
- Assistant engineers – Eric Thompson, Michael Semanick (1, 2, 5–10), Marnie Riley – assistant engineers
- Mastered by Greg Calbi
- Electronic image composition – Ken Fishkin, Todd Rundgren
- Cover art – Todd Rundgren
- Photography – Jean Lannen, Lisa Osta
- Tyopography – Lisa Osta
- Production manager – Michele Gray
- Representation – Eric Gardner (Panacea Entertainment)

== Charts ==
Album - Billboard

Year	Chart	Position
1989	The Billboard 200	102

Singles - Billboard

Year	Single	Chart	Position
1989	"The Want of a Nail"	Mainstream Rock Tracks	15
