= The Best So Far (Cindy Morgan album) =

Greatest hits album by Cindy Morgan
- Released: 1999
- Genre: CCM
- Length: 61:44
- Label: Word Records

Cindy Morgan chronology
The Loving Kind (1998)	The Best So Far (1999)	Elementary (2001)

Professional ratings
Review scores
Source	Rating
Allmusic	link

The Best So Far is the sixth album from Contemporary Christian music singer Cindy Morgan. This greatest hits collects tracks from her first five albums, and contains two new recordings.

== Track listing ==
All songs written by Morgan, except where noted.

1. "Love Is the Answer" Powell, Rundgren, Sulton, Wilcox – 4:20
2. "Tell Me That You Love Me" – 4:24
3. "Picture Me in Paradise" Cunningham, Hammond – 5:36
4. "It's Gonna Be Heaven" Cunningham, Hammond – 4:08
5. "Sweet Days of Grace" Hammond, Morgan – 3:58
6. "How Could I Ask For More" – 3:33
7. "Real Life" Morgan, Thurman, Thurman – 4:14
8. "Listen" – 3:45
9. "Let It Be Love" Cunningham, Hammond – 5:36
10. "I Will Be Free" – 4:55
11. "I'll Stand" Hammond, Morgan, Sims – 4:05
12. "Praise the King" – 3:54
13. "I Know You" – 4:38
14. "Take My Life" – 4:38
