= Anita Renfroe =

American comedian

Anita Renfroe is an American comedian from Atlanta, Georgia, the wife of a Baptist pastor and the mother of three children. She is a regular commentator on Good Morning America. She became famous after her comic rendition of everything that a mother would typically say to her children in the course of a day, set to the William Tell Overture and entitled "Momisms", was posted on YouTube. She has been touring with the largest touring Christian women's conference, Women of Faith, since 2006.

She appeared as a guest performer on the Huckabee Show on Christian-based channel TBN on January 13, 2018.

== Awards ==
- Georgia Author of the Year (Essay) – “Don't Say I Didn't Warn You: Kids, Carbs, and the Coming Hormonal Apocalypse”
