= Signs (Jonny Lang album) =

Studio album by Jonny Lang
- Released: September 1, 2017
- Recorded: 2017
- Studio: Stagg Street Studio (Los Angeles, CA); The VooDrew Room (Nashville, TN); Upstream (Utah)
- Genre: Christian rock; blue-eyed soul; blues; gospel; R&B
- Length: 47:16
- Label: Provogue; Concord
- Producer: Drew and Shannon; Jonny Lang

Jonny Lang chronology
Fight for My Soul (2013)	Signs (2017)

Professional ratings
Review scores
Source	Rating
All About Jazz	4/5 stars
AllMusic	3.5/5 stars
Classic Rock	3.5/5 stars
Spill	4/5 stars

Signs is the seventh studio album by American musician Jonny Lang. It was released on September 1, 2017, via Provogue Records in Europe and on September 8, 2017, via Concord Records in North America. Recording sessions took place at Stagg Street Studio in Los Angeles, The VooDrew Room in Nashville and Upstream in Utah. Production was handled by Lang himself together with Drew and Shannon.

The song "Stronger Together" was premiered on August 11, 2017.

AllMusic named the album as one of the best blues albums of 2017, with 3.5 out of 5 star review by Stephen Thomas Erlewine.

== Track listing ==
No.	Title	Writer(s)	Length
1.	"Make It Move"	Jon Gordon Langseth, Jr.; Andrew Maxwell Ramsey	3:29
2.	"Snakes"	Langseth, Jr.; Ramsey; Shannon Sanders	2:58
3.	"Last Man Standing"	Langseth, Jr.; Ramsey; Sanders	3:26
4.	"Signs"	Langseth, Jr.; Dwan Hill; Ramsey; Sanders	5:35
5.	"What You're Made Of"	Langseth, Jr.; Ramsey; Sanders	4:18
6.	"Bitter End"	Langseth, Jr.; Ramsey; Sanders	4:10
7.	"Stronger Together"	Langseth, Jr.; Ramsey	3:34
8.	"Into the Light"	Langseth, Jr.; Ramsey; Sanders; Dennis Dodd, Jr.	4:01
9.	"Bring Me Back Home"	Langseth, Jr.; Josh Kelley; Tommy King	5:46
10.	"Wisdom"	Langseth, Jr.; Ramsey	4:05
11.	"Singing Songs"	Langseth, Jr.; Hill; Ramsey; Sanders	5:54
Total length:			47:16

== Personnel ==
- Jon Gordon "Jonny Lang" Langseth Jr. – songwriter, vocals, guitar, bass drum and snare (track 10), producer
- Andrew Maxwell "Drew" Ramsey – songwriter (tracks: 1–8, 10, 11), backing vocals (tracks: 1, 3, 5–8, 11), bass (tracks: 1, 7), guitar (tracks: 2, 3, 5–8, 11), handclaps (track 10), producer, recording (tracks: 1, 7, 10), mixing (tracks: 1, 5, 7, 11)
- Shannon Sanders – songwriter (tracks: 2–6, 8, 11), backing vocals (tracks: 1, 3, 5–8, 11), keyboards (tracks: 2, 3, 5, 6, 8), producer
- Jason Eskridge – backing vocals (tracks: 1, 3, 5–8, 11)
- Dwan Hill – songwriter (tracks: 4, 11), keyboards (tracks: 2, 3, 5, 6, 8, 9, 11), electric piano (track 4)
- Jim Anton – bass (tracks: 2, 4–6, 8, 9, 11)
- Barry Alexander – drums (tracks: 2–6, 8, 9, 11)
- Courtlan Clement – guitar (track 3)
- Debi Selby – backing vocals (tracks: 5–8, 11)
- Nickie Conley – backing vocals (tracks: 5–8, 11)
- Dan Needham – drums (track 7)
- Josh Kelley – songwriter, backing vocals, recording & mixing (track 9)
- David Davidson – violin, viola & strings arrangement (track 11)
- Carole Rabinowitz – cello (track 11)
- Bobby Shin – strings (track 11)
- Matt Hyde – recording (tracks: 2–6, 8, 11), mixing (tracks: 2–4, 6, 8, 10)
- Bil Lane – engineering assistant (tracks: 2–6, 8, 11)
- Marcel Fernandez – engineering assistant (tracks: 2–6, 8, 11)
- Tom Baker – mastering
- Carrie Smith – design
- Daniella Hovsepian – photography

== Charts ==
Chart (2017)	Peak position
Austrian Albums (Ö3 Austria)	73
German Albums (Offizielle Top 100)	77
Swiss Albums (Schweizer Hitparade)	47
UK Independent Albums (OCC)	34
UK Jazz & Blues Albums (OCC)	2
US Billboard 200	153
US Top Rock Albums (Billboard)	33
US Top Blues Albums (Billboard)	1
US Indie Store Album Sales (Billboard)	11
