= Up Against It! =

Studio album by Todd Rundgren
- Released: November 11, 1997
- Genre: Rock opera; pop
- Length: 61:37
- Label: Pid
- Producer: Todd Rundgren

Todd Rundgren chronology
With a Twist... (1997)	Up Against It! (1997)	One Long Year (2000)

Professional ratings
Review scores
Source	Rating
Allmusic	2.5/5 stars
Uncut	4/5 stars

Up Against It! is a 1997 album by Todd Rundgren consisting mostly of song demos he wrote and recorded between 1986 and 1989 for the musical theater adaptation of the never-produced screenplay Up Against It. The play was originally written in 1967 by Joe Orton for the Beatles.

== Background ==
This album is Rundgren's score to the stage adaptation of playwright Joe Orton's Up Against It, the unfilmed screenplay originally mooted as the third Beatles film (after A Hard Day's Night and Help!). They declined it, so he reworked it to lessen their presence, successfully sold it to the producer Oscar Lewenstein, and then was violently murdered by boyfriend Kenneth Halliwell in a notorious murder-suicide. With Orton no longer around to help push it along, development stalled, and the script was never filmed. It was published in book form a couple of times, however, and in the 1980s Joseph Papp decided to give the script a new lease on life as a piece of musical theater - hence this score.

The full suite of Rundgren's songs for the musical was released as an album only in Japan, though three re-recorded songs from it were included on his album 2nd Wind. A variant version of the song "Parallel Lines" also appears on Rundgren's album Nearly Human.

In 2016 Todd performed the opera in Groningen, Netherlands, with Mathilde Santing, Wouter Penris and the NNO orchestra (conductor Hans Leenders).

== Track listing ==
All songs by Todd Rundgren.

1. "When Worlds Collide" – 3:36
2. "Free, Male & 21" – 3:36
3. "The Smell of Money" – 3:20 *
4. "If I Have to Be Alone" – 3:45 *
5. "Up Against It" – 3:37
6. "Life Is a Drag" – 3:58
7. "Parallel Lines" – 3:11 **
8. "Lili's Address" – 5:51
9. "Love in Disguise" – 3:55 *
10. "Maybe I'm Better Off" – 4:05
11. "You'll Thank Me in the End" – 4:08
12. "From Hunger" – 2:42
13. "We Understood Each Other" – 4:13
14. "Entropy" – 4:48
15. "Finale" – 7:03

°Titles marked with an asterisk * above appear in re-recorded form on Rundgren's studio album 2nd Wind (1991).

°Parallel Lines" (** above) appears in re-recorded variant form on Rundgren's studio album' Nearly Human (1989)

== Personnel ==
- Todd Rundgren – composer, producer, engineer
