= Turn Around (album) =

Studio album by Jonny Lang
- Released: September 19, 2006
- Recorded: 2006
- Studio: Platinum Lab (Berry Hill, TN); Ameraycan Studio (North Hollywood, CA)
- Genre: Gospel, blue-eyed soul, R&B, Christian rock
- Length: 54:59
- Label: A&M
- Producer: Drew and Shannon; Jonny Lang

Jonny Lang chronology
Long Time Coming (2003)	Turn Around (2006)	Fight for My Soul (2013)

Professional ratings
Review scores
Source	Rating
AllMusic	3/5 stars
PopMatters	8/10
Slant	2/5 stars

Turn Around is the fifth studio album by American musician Jonny Lang. It was released on September 19, 2006, through A&M Records. Recording sessions took place at Platinum Lab in Berry Hill and Ameraycan Studio in North Hollywood with additional recording at Soundstage Studios in Nashville and Drew's Groove Studios. Production was handled by Lang himself together with Drew and Shannon. It features guest appearances from Michael McDonald and Haylie Lang. The album peaked at number 35 on the Billboard 200, number one on the Top Christian Albums chart, and number 12 on the Top Rock Albums chart in the United States. At the 49th Annual Grammy Awards, it won a Grammy Award for Best Rock or Rap Gospel Album.

== Track listing ==
No.	Title	Writer(s)	Length
1.	"Intro"		0:17
2.	"Bump in the Road"	Jonny Lang; Andrew Ramsey; Shannon Sanders	3:40
3.	"One Person at a Time"	Lang; Ramsey; Sanders	3:02
4.	"The Other Side of the Fence"	Lang; Ramsey; Sanders	3:04
5.	"Turn Around"	Lang; Ramsey; Aaron Pearce	4:41
6.	"My Love Remains"	Lang; Ramsey; Sanders; Steven Curtis Chapman	3:51
7.	"Thankful" (featuring Michael McDonald)	Lang; Ramsey; Sanders	4:04
8.	"Only a Man" (featuring Haylie Lang)	Lang	4:15
9.	"Don't Stop (For Anything)"	Lang; Ramsey; Sanders	5:00
10.	"Anything's Possible"	Lang; Ramsey; Sanders	3:48
11.	"Last Goodbye"	Lang; Ramsey	3:56
12.	"On My Feet Again"	Lang; Ramsey; Sanders; Reeve Carney	4:23
13.	"That Great Day"	Lang; Ramsey	4:36
14.	"It's Not Over"	Lang; Ramsey; Sanders	5:32
15.	"Outro"		0:50
Total length:			54:59

== Personnel ==
- Jon Gordon "Jonny Lang" Langseth Jr. – lead vocals (tracks: 2–12, 14), lead guitar (tracks: 2–7, 9, 10, 12, 14), acoustic guitar (track 8), acoustic piano (track 11), guitar (track 13), choir (track 14), producer
- Michael McDonald – lead vocals & piano (track 7)
- Haylie Lang – lead vocals (track 8)
- Andrew Maxwell "Drew" Ramsey – rhythm guitar (tracks: 2–7, 9, 10, 14), synthesizer (track 6), guitar (track 12), choir (track 14), producer, additional recording
- Shannon Sanders – organ (tracks: 2–5, 7, 9, 10, 12, 14), choir (track 14), producer
- James "Jim" Anton – bass (tracks: 2–7, 9–12, 14)
- Michael Bland – drums (tracks: 2–7, 9–12, 14)
- Aaron Pearce – Wurlitzer electric piano (track 5), choir (track 14)
- David Davidson – strings arrangement & violin (track 6)
- Anthony Lamarchina – cello (track 6)
- David Angell – violin (track 6)
- Kristin Wilkinson – viola (track 6)
- Javier Solis – percussion (track 6)
- Sara Watkins – fiddle (track 8)
- Quentin Ware – horns arrangement & trumpet (track 12)
- Jim Horn – baritone saxophone (track 12)
- Doug Moffet – tenor saxophone (track 12)
- Barry Green – trombone (track 12)
- Chris Dunn – trombone (track 12)
- Buddy Miller – guitar (track 13)
- Kenny Meeks – bass & hurdy-gurdy (track 13)
- Sam Bush – mandolin (track 13)
- Ametria Dock – choir (track 14)
- Chimere Scott – choir (track 14)
- Cynthia Matthews – choir (track 14)
- Danelle Corbin – choir (track 14)
- Ester Dean – choir (track 14)
- Jackie Wilson – choir (track 14)
- Kim Keyes – choir (track 14)
- Matthew Johnson – choir (track 14)
- Rebecca A Shocklee – choir (track 14)
- Jon Graves – assistant producer, additional recording
- Matt Hyde – recording
- Daewoo Kim – strings recording
- Mark Linger – additional recording
- Tony High – additional recording
- F. Reid Shippen – mixing (tracks: 1–7, 9–12, 14, 15)
- Neal Cappellino – mixing (tracks: 8, 13)
- Erik "Keller" Jahner – mixing & engineering assistant
- Natthaphol Abhigantaphand – mixing assistant
- Lee Bridges – mixing assistant
- Steve Lotz – mixing assistant
- Jamie Seyberth – engineering assistant
- Greg Fuqua – Pro Tools editing
- Ron Fair – A&R

== Charts ==
Chart (2006)	Peak position
US Billboard 200	35
US Christian Albums (Billboard)	1
US Top Rock Albums (Billboard)	12
