= A Reason to Live (album) =

A Reason To Live

Studio album by Cindy Morgan
- Released: August 10, 1993
- Studio: The Bennett House and North Beach Studio (Franklin, Tennessee)
- Genre: CCM
- Length: 46:59
- Label: Word
- Producer: Mark Hammond

Cindy Morgan chronology
Real Life (1992)	A Reason To Live (1993)	Under the Waterfall (1995)

A Reason To Live is the second album from Contemporary Christian music singer Cindy Morgan. It was released in 1993 by Word Records and earned Morgan a Dove award nomination as Female Vocalist of the Year. The song "I Will Be Free" also received a Dove Award for Short Form Music Video of the Year at the 26th GMA Dove Awards in 1995.

== Track listing ==
All tracks are written by Cindy Morgan, unless otherwise noted.

No.	Title	Lyrics	Music	Length
1.	"Picture Me In Paradise"	Grant Cunningham	Mark Hammond	5:35
2.	"The Days of Innocence"	Cindy Morgan	Mark Hammond	4:36
3.	"Storybook"	Cindy Morgan; Grant Cunningham	Mark Hammond	4:10
4.	"Reaching In"			4:27
5.	"We Can Live Together"	Cindy Morgan	Mark Hammond	5:14
6.	"Love's Still Love"	Grant Cunningham	Mark Hammond	4:07
7.	"A Reason To Live"			5:31
8.	"Let Somebody Love You"	Cindy Morgan; Mark Hammond	Mark Hammond	3:38
9.	"Someone Believes In You"			4:47
10.	"I Will Be Free"			4:54
Total length:				46:59

== Personnel ==
- Cindy Morgan – lead vocals, backing vocals (1–9)
- Mark Hammond – keyboard programming (1–9), bass and drum programming (1–9), arrangements (1–10), backing vocals (2–5, 8), programming (10)
- Brian Green – keyboards (9), acoustic piano (9, 10), programming (10), strings (10), arrangements (10)
- Jerry McPherson – electric guitar (5), guitars (7)
- Billy Crockett – gut-string guitar (5)
- Jackie Street – bass guitar (2)
- Craig Nelson – bass guitar (9)
- John Hammond – drums (9)
- Mervyn Warren – backing vocals (1)
- Michael Mellett – backing vocals (3, 5)
- Geoffrey Thurman – backing vocals (6)
- Chris Willis – backing vocals (6)
- Tina Hutchison – backing vocals (7)
- Tabitha Fair – backing vocals (8)
- Vicky Vaughn – backing vocals (8)

Choir on "We Can Live Together"

- Grant Cunningham, Tina Hutchinson, Michael Mellett, Cindy Morgan and Kip Raines

Production

- John Mays – executive producer
- Mark Hammond – producer
- Ronnie Brookshire – recording, mixing
- Dave Dillbeck – additional engineer, assistant engineer
- Todd Robbins – additional engineer
- Shawn McLean – assistant engineer
- Paul Skaife – assistant engineer
- Ken Love – mastering at MasterMix (Nashville, Tennessee)
- Brent Lenthall – production assistance
- Kim Sagmiller – production coordination, art direction
- Loren Balman – art direction
- Randall Lockwood – design
- Patrick Pollei – design
- Mark Tucker – photography
- Claudia McConnell-Fowler – stylist
- Alvaro Alarcon – hair, make-up
- Mike Atkins – management
