= Long Time Coming (Jonny Lang album) =

Studio album by Jonny Lang
- Released: October 14, 2003
- Recorded: 2003
- Studio: MF Studios (Monrovia, CA); The Attic (Monrovia, CA); Rumbo Recorders (Canoga Park, CA)
- Genre: Christian rock; blue-eyed soul; R&B
- Length: 57:24
- Label: A&M
- Producer: Jonny Lang; Marti Frederiksen; Ron Fair

Jonny Lang chronology
Wander This World (1998)	Long Time Coming (2003)	Turn Around (2006)

Professional ratings
Review scores
Source	Rating
AllMusic	2/5 stars
The Encyclopedia of Popular Music	3/5 stars
Entertainment Weekly	C+
The Penguin Guide to Blues Recordings	1.5/4 stars

Long Time Coming is the fourth studio album by American musician Jonny Lang. It was released on October 14, 2003, via A&M Records. Recording sessions took place at MF Studios and The Attic in Monrovia and Rumbo Recorders in Canoga Park. Production was handled by Marti Frederiksen, Ron Fair, and Lang himself.

The album had been a "long time coming", with five years passing since the release of Wander This World. Lang incorporated more R&B influences into his overall musical style, without neglecting his love for the blues. The album has more rock-elements compared to his previous work, and features one ballad with beat and arrangement comparable to modern R&B/Pop ("Touch"). One of the songs is a cover of Edgar Winter's "Dying to Live" whose drums are programmed by rapper Eminem. The album also features Aerosmith's Steven Tyler on "Happiness and Misery", where he plays the harmonica.

In the United States, the album peaked at number 17 on the Billboard 200 and topped the Blues Albums charts.

== Critical reception ==
AllMusic's Hal Horowitz called the album "a major disappointment and setback for a once promising musician". Entertainment Weekly called it "slick, entirely unmemorable middle-of-the-road rock".

== Track listing ==
No.	Title	Writer(s)	Producer(s)	Length
1.	"Give Me Up Again"	Jon Gordon Langseth Jr.; Martin Harold Frederiksen	Marti Frederiksen; Jonny Lang	4:06
2.	"Red Light"	Anthony Hamilton; Neely Dinkins Jr.	Ron Fair; Jonny Lang	3:44
3.	"Get What You Give"	Langseth Jr.; Frederiksen	Marti Frederiksen; Jonny Lang	3:11
4.	"The One I Got"	Langseth Jr.; Frederiksen	Marti Frederiksen; Jonny Lang; Ron Fair (add.)	3:27
5.	"Touch"	Langseth Jr.; Frederiksen	Marti Frederiksen; Jonny Lang	3:40
6.	"Beautiful One"	Langseth Jr.; Frederiksen	Marti Frederiksen; Jonny Lang	3:23
7.	"If We Try"	Langseth Jr.; Frederiksen	Marti Frederiksen; Jonny Lang	4:23
8.	"Goodbye Letter"	Langseth Jr.; Frederiksen	Marti Frederiksen; Jonny Lang	3:57
9.	"Save Yourself"	Langseth Jr.; Frederiksen	Marti Frederiksen; Jonny Lang	3:40
10.	"To Love Again"	Langseth Jr.; Frederiksen	Marti Frederiksen; Jonny Lang	3:45
11.	"Happiness and Misery"	Langseth Jr.; Frederiksen	Marti Frederiksen; Jonny Lang	3:21
12.	"Hide Your Love"	Langseth Jr.; Frederiksen	Marti Frederiksen; Jonny Lang	4:51
13.	"Dying to Live"	Edgar Winter	Ron Fair; Jonny Lang	4:16
14.	"Long Time Coming"	Langseth Jr.; Frederiksen	Marti Frederiksen; Jonny Lang	2:48
15.	"Livin' for the City"	Stevie Wonder	Ron Fair; Jonny Lang	4:45
Total length:				57:24

Notes

- Track 15 is a bonus track recorded live at the City of Hope concert on October 11, 2001, in California.

== Personnel ==
- Jon Gordon "Jonny Lang" Langseth Jr. – vocals & guitar, percussion (tracks: 3, 5, 7), producer, arrangement (track 2)
- Anthony Hamilton – backing vocals (track 2)
- Kayla Parker – backing vocals (track 5)
- Martin Harold "Marti" Frederiksen – backing vocals (tracks: 11, 12), electric guitar (tracks: 1, 3, 6, 7, 11, 12), acoustic guitar (tracks: 7, 8), bass & drums (tracks: 1, 3, 4, 6–12), piano (tracks: 4, 5, 10, 12), percussion (tracks: 1, 3, 7, 8), producer & Pro Tools engineering (tracks: 1, 3–12, 14)
- John Goux – additional rhythm guitar (track 2), guitar (track 15)
- Alex Al – bass (tracks: 2, 5), electric bass (track 15)
- Joey Waronker – drums (track 2)
- Cecilia Tsan – cello (tracks: 2, 13, 15)
- Steve Erdody – cello (tracks: 2, 13, 15)
- Christina Soule – cello (track 2)
- David Low – cello (track 2)
- Miguel Martinez – cello (track 2)
- Paula Hochhalter – cello (track 2)
- Charlie Bisharat – violin (tracks: 2, 13, 15)
- Bruce Dukov – violin (tracks: 2, 13, 15)
- Endre Granat – violin (tracks: 2, 13, 15)
- Jackie Brand – violin (tracks: 2, 13, 15)
- Joel Derouin – violin (tracks: 2, 13, 15)
- Natalie Leggett – violin (tracks: 2, 13, 15)
- Sara Parkins – violin (tracks: 2, 13, 15)
- Anatoly Rosinsky – violin (tracks: 2, 13)
- Armen Garabedian – violin (tracks: 2, 13)
- Mario DeLeon – violin (tracks: 2, 13)
- Phillip Levy – violin (tracks: 2, 13)
- Robin Olson – violin (tracks: 2, 13)
- Songa Lee – violin (tracks: 2, 13)
- Katia Popov – violin (tracks: 2, 15)
- Berj Garabedian – violin (track 2)
- Clayton Haslop – violin (track 2)
- Franklyn D'Antonio – violin (track 2)
- Liane Mautner – violin (track 2)
- Brian Dembow – viola (tracks: 2, 13, 15)
- Matt Funes – viola (tracks: 2, 13)
- Simon Oswell – viola (tracks: 2, 13)
- Harry Shirinian – viola (track 2)
- Marlow Fisher – viola (track 2)
- Steve Gordon – viola (track 2)
- Ron Fair – producer & arrangement (tracks: 2, 13, 15), additional producer & additional arrangement (track 4), conductor (tracks: 13, 15), bass (track 13), vibraphone (track 15), A&R
- James William Cox – Wurlitzer electric piano (tracks: 3–6, 10), keyboards (tracks: 3, 6, 8), piano (tracks: 3, 6)
- Lenny Castro – congas (track 3)
- Bruce McCabe – clavinet (track 7)
- Paul Santo – clavinet (track 11)
- Steven Tyler – harmonica (track 11)
- John Beasley – piano & arrangement (track 13)
- Frances Liu Wu – bass (track 13)
- Nico Abondolo – bass (track 13)
- Gary Novak – live drums (track 13)
- Larry Corbett – cello (track 13)
- Suzie Katayama – cello (track 13)
- Alan Grunfeld – violin (track 13)
- Josefina Vergara – violin (track 13)
- Roberto Cani – violin (track 13)
- Sam Formicola – viola (track 13)
- Bill Hughes – contractor (track 13)
- Marshall "Eminem" Mathers III – drum programming (track 13)
- Greg Poree – guitar (track 15)
- Michael Bearden – keyboards (track 15)
- Robbie Buchanan – keyboards (track 15)
- Abe Laboriel Jr. – drums (track 15)
- Alex Acuña – percussion (track 15)
- Jerry Hey – trumpet & arrangement (track 15)
- Gary Grant – trumpet (track 15)
- Bill Reichenbach – trombone (track 15)
- Barbra Porter – violin (track 15)
- Tiffany Yi Hu – violin (track 15)
- Vicki Miskolczy – viola (track 15)
- Dan Higgins – woodwind (track 15)
- Larry Williams – woodwind (track 15)
- Chris Lord-Alge – mixing (tracks: 2–4, 6, 8–11, 14)
- Tom Lord-Alge – mixing (tracks: 1, 7, 12)
- Tony Maserati – mixing (track 5)
- Scott Gordon – engineering (tracks: 3, 6, 8–11)
- Mikel Reid – additional engineering (tracks: 8, 9), drum programming (track 10)
- Tal Herzberg – Pro Tools recording (tracks: 2, 13), recording & mixing (track 15)
- Brian Paturalski – Pro Tools engineering (tracks: 3–6, 8, 10, 11)
- Richard Chycki – Pro Tools engineering (tracks: 1, 7, 12)
- John Hoyt – engineering assistant (tracks: 3, 8–11)
- Anthony Kilhoffer – engineering assistant (track 13)
- Ethan Willoughby – engineering assistant (track 13)
- Kurt Iswarienko – photography
- Lawrence Azerrad – design
- Jimmy Iovine – A&R

== Charts ==
Chart (2003)	Peak position
US Billboard 200	17
US Top Blues Albums (Billboard)	1
