= Fuge Camps =

Christian summer camps

FUGE Camps is a series of Christian summer camps for children, youth, and young adults centered on Bible study, worship, mission work, and recreational activities organized by LifeWay Christian Resources of the Southern Baptist Convention. FUGE Camps offers four different styles of camp, where churches can choose to attend either Centrifuge (CFUGE or CF) or Mission Fuge (MFUGE or MF). At "combo" locations, churches can choose to do a mixture of these, if they desire, to meet their student's needs.

== Background ==
Since 1979 FUGE has been the official youth camp of the Southern Baptist Convention. What started out as a few weeks of camp sponsored by the Baptist Sunday School Board (now LifeWay Christian Resources) turned into a youth ministry movement.

=== Programming ===
FUGE Camps are open to students who have just completed grades 6–12. College students and adults can attend camp as Adult Sponsors. They are centered on the youth groups of Christian churches, particularly (though not exclusively) Baptist churches.

=== Locations ===
Locations of FUGE camps:

| Location | City | State | First Summer Hosting | Camps Hosted |
|---|---|---|---|---|
| Ridgecrest Conference Center | Ridgecrest | North Carolina | 1979 (Original Location) | CF, MF, XF, XFM |
| Glorieta Conference Center | Glorieta | New Mexico | 1979 (Original Location) | CF, MF, XF, XFM |
| Union University | Jackson | Tennessee | 1987 | CF |
| Carson-Newman University | Jefferson City | Tennessee | 1990 | CF, MF, XF, XFM |
| North Greenville University | Tigerville | South Carolina | 1982 | CF, MF, XF, XFM |
| Mississippi College | Clinton | Mississippi | 2002 | CF, MF, XF, XFM |
| Jenness Park | Cold Springs | California | 1983 | CF |
| Shalimar Retreat Center | Panama City Beach | Florida | 1990 | CF, XF |
| Shorter University | Rome | Georgia | 2016 | CF |
| Southern Baptist Theological Seminary | Louisville | Kentucky | 2013 | MF, XFM |
| University of Mobile | Mobile | Alabama | 1981 | CF, MF, XF, XFM |
| Belmont University | Nashville | Tennessee | 1997 | MF, XFM |
| Palm Beach Atlantic University | West Palm Beach | Florida | | MF, XFM |
| Charleston Southern University | Charleston | South Carolina | 2000 | MF, XFM |
| Mile High Pines | Angelus Oaks | California | | CF |
| Eastern University | St. Davids | Pennsylvania | 1999 | MF, XFM |
| Houston Baptist University | Houston | Texas | 2013 | MF, XFM |
| Liberty University | Lynchburg | Virginia | 2016 | CF, MF, XF, XFM |
| Southwest Baptist University | Bolivar | Missouri | 2011 | CF |
| Louisiana College | Pineville | Louisiana | 2017 | MF, XFM |
| Shocco Springs Conference Center | Talladega | Alabama | 2017 | CF, XF |
| Fairmont State University | Fairmont | West Virginia | 2018 | CF |
| Louisiana Christian University | Pineville | Louisiana | 2024 | CF, MF |
| Ouachita Baptist University | Arkadelphia | Arkansas | 2024 | CF, MF |
| Regent University | Virginia Beach | Virginia | 2024 | CF, MF |
| Southwestern Baptist Theological Seminary | Fort Worth | Texas | 2024 | CF, MF |
| Southern Wesleyan University | Central | South Carolina | 2024 | CF, MF |
| William Carey University | Hattiesburg | Mississippi | 2024 | CF |
| James Madison University | Harrisonburg | Virginia | 2024 | CF, MF |
| Missouri Baptist University | St. Louis | Missouri | 2024 | MF |
| Chowan University | Murfreesboro | North Carolina | 2024 | CF |
| Cumberland University | Lebanon | Tennessee | | MF |
| Highland Lakes Camp | Martinsville | Indiana | 2025 | CF |
| Milligan University | Milligan | Tennessee | 2025 | CF, MF |
| Southeastern University | Lakeland | Florida | 2024 | CF, MF |
| WorldSong Retreat Center | Cook Springs | Alabama | 2025 | CF |
| Erskine College | Due West,South Carolina | South Carolina | 2026 | CF, MF |

== FUGE Staff Structure ==
FUGE Camp staffs typically consist of 20-30 staffers, but can be as small as 12 staffers or as large as 60. Each location has a Camp Director, assistant director, Financial Director, and Program Director. Locations that offer Centrifuge will have a Recreation Director and Bible Study Leaders. Locations that offer MFuge will have a Site Director and ministry Track Leaders. Each location has a Video Producer, who makes daily and weekly videos. Larger locations will hire FUGE Support Staffers who help with set up, tear down, and other office tasks. Some locations have full-summer bands, which are referred to as "Staff Bands." These band members will also be Bible Study Leaders or Ministry Track Leaders.

== Crosspoint sports camp ==
Crosspoint originally started in 1986. It was the first Centrifuge spin off. Crosspoint is designed to combine the structure of Centrifuge with the sports-skills teaching of the traditional sports daycamp. The programming and sports instruction is designed for students in grades 4–8. 2009 was the last year LifeWay ran a kids' camp by the name "Crosspoint." All the sports once included in Crosspoint have now been implemented in LifeWay's CentriKid camp.

== XFUGE and XFUGE on Mission (2005-2018) ==
XFUGE and XFUGE on Mission took the general template of a normal FUGE Camp and removed many of the traditional "summer camp" aspects, like assemblies and structured track times and reoriented the experience toward a Christian retreat: spiritual formation was conducted through worship experiences and optional missions work, but leisure activities, such as swimming or sunbathing on the beach, were more prominent.

The XFUGE variants to the FUGE experience were first offered in the Summer of 2005. XFUGE was offered every year thereafter, coming to and end in 2018 (the last year they offered XFUGE).
