= 2nd Wind =

Studio album by Todd Rundgren
- Released: January 16, 1991
- Recorded: July 1990
- Venues: Palace of Fine Arts in San Francisco, California
- Genre: Rock
- Length: 53:52
- Labels: Warner Bros. Friday Music (2008 Remaster)
- Producer: Todd Rundgren

Todd Rundgren chronology
Nearly Human (1989)	2nd Wind (1991)	No World Order (1993)

Singles from 2nd Wind
- 1. "Change Myself" Released: July 1991; 2. "Public Servant" Released: 1991

Professional ratings
Review scores
Source	Rating
AllMusic	3/5 stars
Classic Rock	7/10 stars
Entertainment Weekly	D

2nd Wind is the thirteenth album by American musician Todd Rundgren, released on January 16, 1991 by Warner Bros. Records. It reached number 118 on the Billboard 200 album chart. 2nd Wind includes the single "Change Myself" and was Rundgren's final album on a major label until 2004's Liars.

== Background ==
As with its predecessor, Nearly Human, Rundgren chose to record the album with a full band, as opposed to playing all of the instruments himself. The album was recorded live in front of an audience at the Palace of Fine Arts in San Francisco, California, over the course of a week.

The album includes three songs ("The Smell of Money", "If I Have to Be Alone" and "Love in Disguise") written for Rundgren's musical version of the Joe Orton play/screenplay Up Against It. "Gaya's Eyes" continues the new, more mature sound introduced on the preceding album Nearly Human.

Rundgren used the video for the album's only single, "Change Myself," as a showcase for the NewTek Video Toaster, a desktop video card for the Commodore Amiga computer.

== Releases ==
Promotional DJ issues of the CD have a black, gold and blue swirl on the CD label where the stock releases have a blue and yellow swirl. There was also a vinyl release of the album in Europe which is nearly impossible to find.

After the album had been out of print for several years, Friday Music released a remastered version in October 2008, the first release in what the company called the "Todd Rundgren Remaster Series", although the follow-up remastered release of Nearly Human didn't arrive until 2021.

In 2002, Image Entertainment released a DVD entitled The 2nd Wind Recording Sessions, which detailed the making of the album, and featured interviews with Rundgren as well as band members and fans. Also included with the video was The Desktop Collection, a compilation of Rundgren's Video Toaster-powered music videos, including "Change Myself."

== Track listing ==
All songs written by Todd Rundgren.

No.	Title	Length
1.	"Change Myself"	5:21
2.	"Love Science"	5:23
3.	"Who's Sorry Now?"	6:15
4.	"The Smell of Money" (from the musical Up Against It)	4:06
5.	"If I Have to Be Alone" (from the musical Up Against It)	3:51
6.	"Love in Disguise" (from the musical Up Against It)	4:02
7.	"Kindness"	5:31
8.	"Public Servant"	5:38
9.	"Gaya's Eyes"	6:13
10.	"Second Wind"	7:32

== Personnel ==
- Todd Rundgren – lead vocals, guitar
- Roger Powell – keyboards, backing vocals
- Vince Welnick – keyboards, backing vocals
- Ross Valory – bass, backing vocals
- Lyle Workman – guitar, backing vocals
- Prairie Prince – drums
- Max Haskett – trumpet, mellophone, backing vocals
- Bobby Strickland – saxophones, clarinets, flute, oboe, backing vocals
- Scott Mathews – percussion, guitar, samples, backing vocals
- Shandi Sinnamon – backing vocals, co-lead vocals on "Love in Disguise"
- Michele Gray – backing vocals
- Jenni Muldaur – backing vocals

== Charts ==
Chart performance for 2nd Wind
Chart (1991)	Peak position
US Billboard 200	188
