= Real Life (Cindy Morgan album) =

Studio album by Cindy Morgan
- Released: February 25, 1992
- Studio: North Beach Studios (Franklin, Tennessee); Nightingale Studio (Nashville, Tennessee)
- Genre: Contemporary Christian music, dance-pop, new jack swing
- Length: 46:59
- Label: Word, Epic
- Producer: Mark Hammond

Cindy Morgan chronology
| Real Life (1992) | A Reason to Live (1993) |

Real Life is the debut album from contemporary Christian music singer Cindy Morgan. It was jointly released in 1992 by Word Records (for the Christian market) and Epic Records (for the secular market). This set earned Morgan her first 6 Dove Award nominations, ultimately resulting in her first win, in the New Artist category. Two singles from this album were released to commercial radio: "Say It Again" and "Anytime At All."

== Track listing ==
US/Canada:

1. "Real Life" (Hammond, Geoff Thurman, Becky Thurman) – 4:14
2. "Say It Again" (Morgan, Tommy Greer, Hammond, Cunningham) – 3:39
3. "Moment In Time" (Morgan, Hammond, Cunningham) – 4:09
4. "Let It Be Love" (Morgan, Hammond) – 5:33
5. "2 Hearts, 1 Love" (Morgan, Hammond, Cunningham) – 4:28
6. "Free World" (Geoff Thurman, Marabeth Jordan) – 4:11
7. "It's Gonna Be Heaven" (Cunningham, Hammond) – 4:07
8. "Anytime At All" (Cunningham, Hammond) – 4:34
9. "Love Could Break Your Fall" (Hammond, Cunningham) – 4:45
10. "How Could I Ask For More" (Morgan) – 3:32

== Personnel ==
- Cindy Morgan – lead vocals, backing vocals (1–8)
- Mark Hammond – keyboard programming (1–9), bass and drum programming (1–9), backing vocals (1–3, 5, 6), BGV arrangements (4, 6, 7)
- Phil Naish – acoustic piano (10)
- Jerry McPherson – guitars (2, 4–6), electric guitar (9)
- Mark Baldwin – gut-string guitar (9)
- Mark Douthit – saxophone (8)
- Lisa Bevill – backing vocals (1, 2, 5), BGV arrangements (5)
- Joe Hogue – backing vocals (1, 5), BGV arrangements (5)
- Chris Rodriguez – backing vocals (2)
- Geoffrey Thurman – backing vocals (4, 6), BGV arrangements (4)
- Mervyn Warren – backing vocals (7), BGV arrangements (7)
- Grant Cunningham – BGV arrangements (7)

Choir on "Let It Be Love"

- Grant Cunningham, Celeste Hammond, Tina Hutchison, Michael Mellett, Scott Moore and Vicky Vaughn

=== Production ===
- John Mays – executive producer
- Mark Hammond – producer, arrangements
- Ronnie Brookshire – recording, mixing
- Todd Robbins – additional engineer, assistant engineer
- Brian Lenthall – assistant engineer, production assistant
- Tom Reeves – editing at West Park Sound (Nashville, Tennessee)
- Ken Love – mastering at MasterMix (Nashville, Tennessee)
- Mark Tucker – photography
- Amy Linde – art direction
- Tom Tufts – art direction, design
- Alvaro Alacron – hair, make-up
