= Up Against It =

Film script by Joe Orton

Up Against It is an unproduced script by Joe Orton, written in 1967 for the Beatles at the height of their fame.

== Background ==
Orton's screenplay was a revised version of a 1966 script called Shades of a Personality, by Owen Holder, which producer Walter Shenson wanted Orton to "punch-up", in his words; Orton incorporated portions of this prior draft, but used, as the opening of the story, a concept he and his companion Kenneth Halliwell had explored in a now-lost novel from 1957, The Silver Bucket. The story's skeleton also borrowed liberally from Orton's final novel, written in 1959, called The Vision of Gombold Provol (posthumously published as Head to Toe).

After a proper contract had been drawn up, allowing Orton to buy back the rights to his script should it be refused, Orton submitted the script to the Beatles' manager, Brian Epstein; after a long period of silence, his screenplay was returned to him without comment.

Orton further revised Up Against It after this event, paring down the four leads to three (mainly by combining parts intended for Beatles members George Harrison and Ringo Starr into one role). Producer Oscar Lewenstein accepted the script, considering Mick Jagger and Ian McKellen for two of the leads. Lewenstein and Orton planned a meeting with director Richard Lester at Twickenham Film Studios to discuss filming options on the script. On the morning the chauffeur arrived to take Orton to the meeting, he discovered him and Halliwell dead inside their home. Halliwell had bludgeoned Orton to death with a hammer and then committed suicide with an overdose of Nembutal tablets.

== Synopsis ==
The screenplay begins with the expulsion from a provincial town of two young men of no fixed ambition, Ian McTurk and Christopher Low; Ian is a sexually profligate charmer, Low quixotic and pure of heart. They are banished because Ian has deflowered Rowena Torrence, niece of the local high priest, Father Brodie; present to see them off are amiably opportunistic Mayor Terence O'Scullion, sexually dangerous police official Connie Boon ("rhymes with loon", the Mayor says), and plain-Jane secretary Miss Patricia Drumgoole, who is desperately in love with Ian.

Wandering the woods outside of town, Christopher meets and winds up at the mansion of eccentric millionaire Bernard Coates; also present at the mansion is the sinister Connie, who frightens the innocent Low into sexual slavery. Meanwhile, Ian has fled the scene, enraged by Miss Drumgoole's revelation that Rowena is to marry Coates. He comes upon a group of anarchists led by Jack Ramsay, a rootless troublemaker whose plan is to assassinate the new (female) Prime Minister. Also in Ramsay's ragged cadre are the deposed Mayor, embittered kept boy Christopher, and Miss Drumgoole, now a government clerk out to commit sabotage.

Jack, Ian, and Christopher affect female drag to gain entrance to the Royal Albert Hall, where Jack guns down the PM. They escape. Later, Jack disrupts the Prime Minister's funeral march with a speech in favour of public debauchery and an end to private perversion. The crowd finds this notion not merely sensible but appealing. A riot ensues, and the three hide out in the newsagent's shop of Jack's wizened anarchist father. Ian is lured away by the treacherous Rowena, and captured; Jack and Christopher are cornered by police and shot down.

For the next ten years Ian languishes in prison before being liberated by the miraculously still-living and patiently tunnel-digging Jack. They escape through a sewer and into the sea, where they are pulled into a luxury yacht attended by none other than Christopher Low, who is cabin boy to the now-married Rowena and Coates. A mad tea party follows, attended by all three heroes, Rowena, Coates, the Mayor and his wife, and Miss Drumgoole. Ian again tries and fails to seduce Rowena; while Miss Drumgoole, still in love with Ian, throws herself overboard when he rejects her. Before they can be arrested, Jack, Ian, and Christopher abscond in the lifeboat; they find Miss Drumgoole adrift, then become caught in a storm.

Ian awakens on a beach and is taken to a hospital, where Connie reappears to draft him into the war now being fought between government and rebel forces. At the recruitment centre he reunites with Jack and Christopher, who convince him to go over to the rebels. The three go off to battle, where Ian is wounded and they again cross paths with Miss Drumgoole. The Mayor turns up, as does Jack's father; sides are switched again, and still again. Finally the bickering crew crash their stolen ambulance into a lorry carrying wounded — and in an epic disaster scene, a series of escalating conflagrations climaxes in the opening of the earth itself to swallow the dead, the dying, the wounded, and even their scurrying medics. At which point Father Brodie materializes, surrounded in sepulchral procession by the chants and prayers of the faithful, to bless the hellish battlefield. Ian sobs, Christopher kneels in spiritual surrender, and Jack loses his mind.

All are taken prisoner — only to be given medals and honoured as heroes: their initial ambulance crash, it seems, resulted in the winning of the war and defeat of the rebels. Jack's anarchist father is now a decorated general; the Mayor has been restored to power; and Christopher is engaged to Connie. But in a welter of last-minute reversals, the world is set off-balance yet again. Christopher, appalled once too often by Connie's virulent sexism, calls off their engagement; Jack's father finds himself demoted to hotel bellhop; and Ian, though he still loves Rowena, offers himself to the faithful Miss Drumgoole. ("My heart is broken, but everything else is in working order.") She accepts the proposal of marriage — to all three heroes. Ian, Jack, and Christopher wed Miss Drumgoole in a Mass officiated by Father Brodie and attended by the whole happy cast, and the screenplay ends with bride and grooms in polygamous morning-after intimacy, disappearing with squeals of delight under the conjugal sheets.

== Legacy ==
The revised version of Up Against It was first published, with an introduction by Orton's biographer John Lahr, in 1979; the original draft has never been published. The manuscript of this draft resides in the Joe Orton Collection at the University of Leicester.

Although the actual screenplay has never been staged or filmed, a musical theatre adaptation of Up Against It opened Off Broadway on 14 November 1989, with music by Todd Rundgren and featuring Roger Bart and Alison Fraser. A recording of Rundgren's song demos for the show was released in Japan in 1997 (Up Against It!). Several recorded songs from the show appeared on Rundgren's albums Nearly Human and 2nd Wind.

== Radio play ==
A 90-minute radio play was broadcast in September 1997 in the UK on BBC Radio 3, produced by Armada, adapted by John Fletcher and directed by John Adams and including various Beatles songs. The cast included Fawlty Towers' Prunella Scales, Blur's singer Damon Albarn, and Leo McKern as the narrator. McKern had played the villain, Clang, in Help!.

The full cast:

- The Narrator: Leo McKern
- John "Jack" Ramsey: Damon Albarn
- The Mayor: Kenneth Cranham
- Christopher Lowe: David Calder
- Bernard Coats: Joseph Fiennes
- Ian McTurk: Douglas Hodge
- Father Brodie: Mark Lambert
- Patricia Dromgard: Jasinta Makhai
- Rowena Torrene: Louise Lombard
- The Prime Minister: Prunella Scales
- Connie Boon: Sylvia Syms
- Other voices: Alan Mitchell, Mark Webb, Edward Halstead
- Thanks: John Gielgud, Joe Dhaley
