= Larry Tagg =

American historian

Larry Tagg is an American rock musician, songwriter and producer; a retired high school English and drama teacher; and also an American Civil War historian. He was co-leader of the band Bourgeois Tagg in the 1980s with Brent Bourgeois and has released two solo albums. After Bourgeois Tagg broke up, Tagg worked as a staff songwriter for Warner/Chappell Music. Tagg has also published a number of works on Civil War history. Tagg is the older brother of musician Eric Tagg.

== Early life and education ==
Born in Lincoln, Illinois, Tagg grew up in Illinois and Dallas, Texas. As a high school senior in 1969 he attended a concert by Jimi Hendrix, walked backstage, and talked with drummer Mitch Mitchell. He graduated from the University of North Texas with a degree in Philosophy and was awarded a teaching assistantship at the University of Texas but left after one semester.

== Music career ==
Tagg moved with Brent Bourgeois to California's Bay Area, and in the late 1970s they played in a Sacramento band called Uncle Rainbow, which included members from Texas and other parts of the South. In 1984, Tagg and Bourgeois moved to Sacramento and formed Bourgeois Tagg with guitarist Lyle Workman, drummer Michael Urbano, and keyboardist Scott Moon. Bourgeois played keyboards, Tagg played bass, and both shared lead vocal duties.

Their debut album Bourgeois Tagg was produced by David J. Holman and spawned two singles, "Mutual Surrender (What a Wonderful World)" a number 62 hit on the Billboard Hot 100 and "The Perfect Life". In 1987, Bourgeois Tagg recorded Yoyo with producer Todd Rundgren. It was released in autumn, and the band had what would prove to be their biggest hit with its first single "I Don't Mind at All", which peaked at number 38 on the Billboard Hot 100, and made the top 40 in Canada and the UK.

After Bourgeois Tagg, several members contributed to Rundgren's 1989 album Nearly Human. Tagg, Lyle Workman, and Michael Urbano also joined his live band for the album's tour in 1989 and 1990. Tagg also played in Hall & Oates' touring band in 1990. Tagg remained Rundgren's touring bass player until 1996.

In the 1990s, Tagg also worked as a staff songwriter for Warner/Chappell Music. Some songs he wrote were recorded by Kim Carnes, Eddie Money, Lee Ritenour, Jenni Muldaur, and others.

== Solo recordings ==
Tagg has released two solo albums: 1995's With a Skeleton Crew and 1997's Rover. All five members of Bourgeois Tagg appeared on With a Skeleton Crew, with all but Scott Moon playing on the track "1/2 Yes, 1/2 No." Tagg has said that the song was written for the third Bourgeois Tagg album that never materialized, so with Lyle Workman's help, he recorded the song himself.

== High school teacher ==
By the mid-1990s Tagg had a family, and no longer wanted to remain on the road. He became an English and drama teacher, and lead teacher of the arts academy, at Hiram W. Johnson High School in Sacramento. He began writing in his spare time and has written numerous books on Abraham Lincoln. He taught English, literature, and creative writing at C.K. McClatchy High School in Sacramento, CA until retiring in 2017 to conduct more research on Lincoln.

== Historian ==
Tagg has written a number of books on Civil War history:

- The Generals of Gettysburg: The Leaders of America's Greatest Battle, Savas Publishing 1998 (paperback Da Capo Press 2004)
  - Described by a reviewer as "a thumbnail sketch biography of each of the infantry commanders who took part in the battle, from the brigade level up. ...should find a home on the bookshelves of those readers whose special interest is Gettysburg."
- The Unpopular Mr. Lincoln: The Story of America's Most Reviled President, Savas Beatie 2009 (paperback Savas Beatie 2012 under new title The Battles that Made Abraham Lincoln: How Lincoln Mastered his Enemies to Win the Civil War, Free the Slaves, and Preserve the Union)
  - This book argues Abraham Lincoln was widely disliked during his presidency, and only after being assassinated did more complimentary or even hagiographic information begin to circulate.
- The Generals of Shiloh: Character In Leadership, April 6–7, 1862, Savas Beatie 2017

== The Green Grass Snakes ==
Tagg is a member of The Green Grass Snakes, a Sacramento-based band that covers songs by The Beatles and other groups from the 1950s to 1980s.
