= Michael Urbano =

American drummer

- Born: Sacramento, California, U.S.
- Occupation: Drummer
- Instrument: Drums
- Years active: 1986–present
- Formerly of: Third Eye Blind; Cracker; Smash Mouth

Michael Urbano is an American drummer.

== Career ==
One of Urbano's first gigs was as a member of Bourgeois Tagg, a 1980s band that was fronted by Brent Bourgeois and Larry Tagg and included Lyle Workman as the guitarist. They had moderate success with their second album, Yoyo, which was produced by Todd Rundgren, and featured the Top 40 hit, "I Don't Mind at All." When the band split, Urbano, Tagg, and Workman recorded and toured with Todd Rundgren for his Nearly Human album and tour during 1989–1990.

While with John Hiatt (1995–1999), Urbano toured extensively as one of Hiatt's "Nashville Queens" that included bassist Davey Faragher (Elvis Costello) and guitarist David Immergluck (Counting Crows). The Nashville Queens also worked with Hiatt in the studio, recording Walk On, Little Head and Crossing Muddy Waters.

Urbano spent time as the drummer for the pop rock group Smash Mouth. He originally joined the band briefly in mid-1999, replacing original drummer Kevin Coleman, and performed during the first portion of their Astro Lounge tour, though was soon replaced by touring drummer Mitch Marine. When Marine departed, he joined Smash Mouth permanently in early 2000. He stayed for six years and departed on February 14, 2006. Before Smash Mouth, Urbano had played drums with The Spent Poets, The Kinetics, Deathray, Third Eye Blind, John Hiatt, Black Lab, Cracker, Paul Westerberg, Red House Painters, Willy DeVille, Camper Van Beethoven, and Sheryl Crow.

In 2006 Urbano left Smash Mouth due to creative differences. He recorded with Fischerspooner and played live with Cake as well as leading Artist Development at fuzz.com. In July 2007, he worked with Luciano Ligabue for recording a new song, "Niente paura". In early 2008 he became a band member with Luciano Ligabue, playing drums for the European Tour, and through mid-2008 in the main stadiums of Italy for the ElleSette tour. He was also in the band for the seven dates at Verona Arena in September and October 2008 with the Arena's orchestra, and during the same months of 2009 for ten concerts.

Urbano rejoined Smash Mouth in June 2009, but was replaced by Randy Cooke in 2010.

In 2022, Urbano was the touring drummer for Lindsey Buckingham.
