= Women of Faith =

Christian global ministry

Women of Faith, LLC.
- Type: Parachurch organization Non-denominational
- Industry: Women's Conferences
- Founded: 1996
- Headquarters: Lincoln, NE, USA
- Key people: Stephen Arterburn, Founder; Alita Reynolds, Foundational Voice of Women of Faith
- Website: www.womenoffaith.com

Women of Faith is a Christian global ministry (87 countries) providing digital media, resources and events to encourage and equip women to experience a deeper relationship with Jesus. It has staged non-denominational events across North America. According to the company, its events have been attended by more than five million people in total.

New Life Treatment Centers began staging the events in 1996. Thomas Nelson Publishers purchased a 60 per cent stake in New Life Treatment Centers in 2000, and subsequently transferred operation of the events to its Live Event Management subsidiary. In 2013 Live Event Management's Women of Faith was purchased by the William Morris Agency. William Morris Agency, now WME Entertainment has since sold Women of Faith.

Originally focusing on weekend events, it has also offered Revolve events aimed at teenage girls since 2005 and one-day evening events since 2012.

The theme for the events is changed yearly. The content includes speakers, comedians, music and drama alongside worship and prayer. The organization partners with Food for the Hungry.

== Tour themes ==
Woman Of Faith. Women Of Faith

1996–97 – The Joyful Journey

1998 – Bring Back the Joy

1999 – Outrageous Joy

2000 – Extravagant Grace

2001 – Boundless Love

2002 – Sensational Love

2003 – The Great Adventure

2004 – Irrepressible Hope

2005 – Extraordinary Faith

2006 – Contagious Joy

2007 – Amazing Freedom

2008 – Infinite Grace

2009 – A Grand New Day

2010 – East Coast – Over the Top; West Coast – Imagine

2011 – East Coast – Imagine; West Coast – Over the Top

2012 – Celebrate What Matters

2013 – Believe God Can Do Anything

2014 – From Survival to Revival

2015 – 2016 – Loved Tour

2017 – Sisters Tour

2018 – Generations Retreat with Thelma Wells

2019 – Be The Light Event

2020 – Be the Light Event

The Revolve Tour

2011 – Dream On

2012 – No Tour

2013 – This is love

2014 – No Tour
