= Jonny Lang =

American singer, songwriter (born 1981)

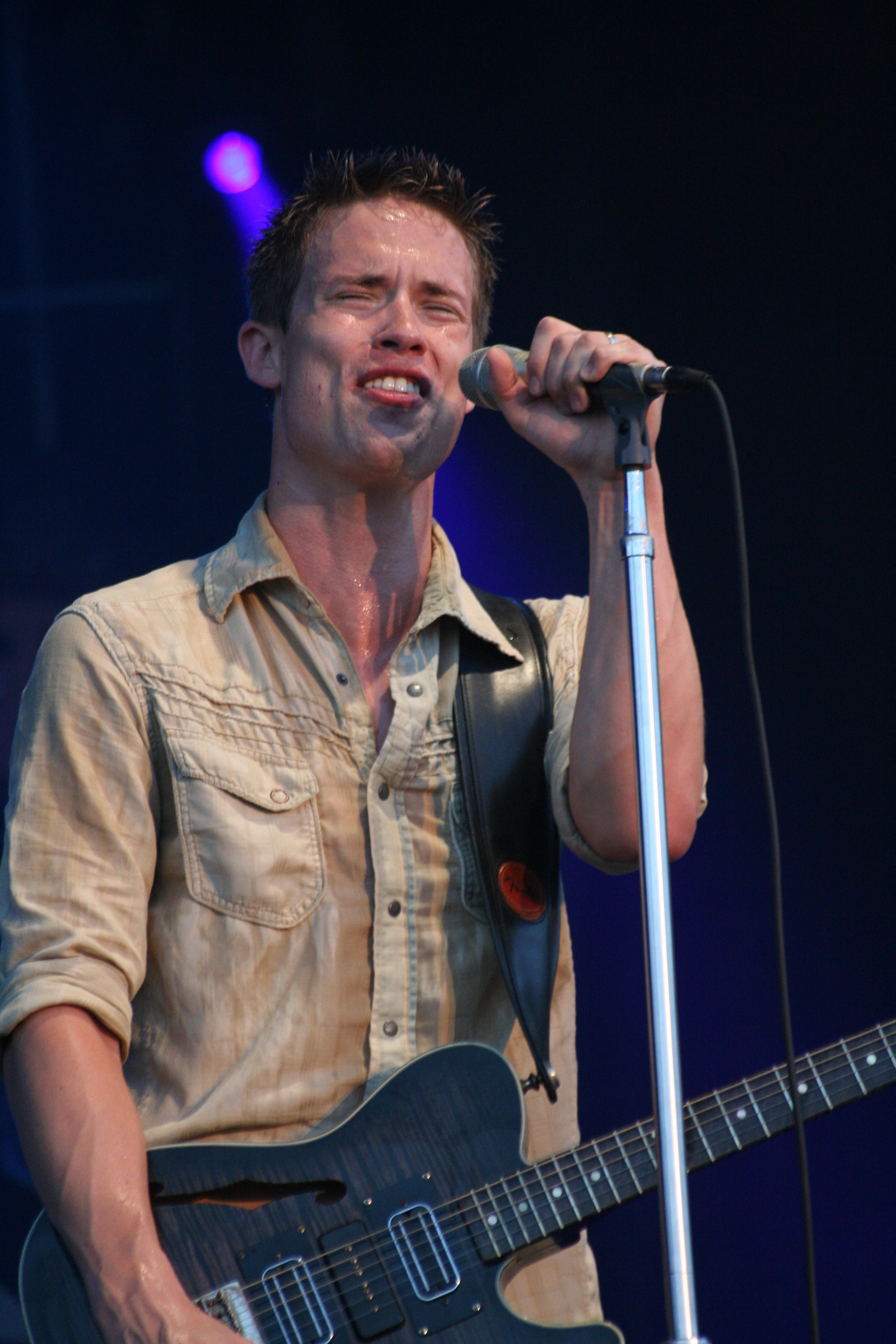
- Lang in 2007

Background information
- Born: Jon Gordon Langseth Jr. January 29, 1981 (age 45); Fargo, North Dakota, U.S.
- Genres: Blues, gospel, rock
- Instruments: Vocals, guitar
- Years active: 1995–2021
- Labels: A&M, Concord International, Interscope
- Spouse: Haylie Johnson (m. 2001)
- Website: www.jonnylang.com

Jon Gordon Langseth Jr. (born January 29, 1981), known as Jonny Lang, is an American blues, gospel, rock singer, songwriter, and guitarist. He has recorded five albums that have charted on the top 50 of the Billboard 200 chart and won a Grammy Award for his 2006 album Turn Around.

== Biography ==
Jonny Lang was born Jon Gordon Langseth Jr. in Fargo, North Dakota and is of Norwegian descent. He started playing the guitar for his friends at age 12. He played a wide variety of music. He also performed a rendition of Jimi Hendrix's version of the National Anthem. Soon after his father took him to see the Bad Medicine Blues Band, one of the few blues bands in Fargo, Lang started taking guitar lessons from Ted Larsen, the band's guitar player. Several months after Lang began, he joined the band, which was then renamed Kid Jonny Lang & The Big Bang. Two years later, A&M Records, who had signed Janet Jackson and Soundgarden, was invited to come to see him at a live performance at Bunkers Bar in Minneapolis, and he was signed to the label in 1996, becoming the latest in a trend of young blues guitarists that then included Kenny Wayne Shepherd and Derek Trucks.

The band moved to Minneapolis, Minnesota, and independently released the album Smokin' when Lang was 14. He released Lie to Me on January 28, 1997 and its title track would go on to become his most successful. The next album, Wander this World, was released on October 20, 1998, and earned a Grammy nomination. This was followed by the more soulful Long Time Coming on October 14, 2003. Lang also made a cover of Edgar Winter's "Dying to Live". Lang's 2006 album, the gospel-influenced Turn Around, won him his first Grammy Award.

In his earliest performing years, Lang always performed barefoot on stage because "it feels good" and once in tribute to Luther Allison, a friend who had recently died.

Lang made a cameo appearance in the 1998 film Blues Brothers 2000, as a janitor. In 1999, he was invited to play at the White House for President Bill Clinton and the first lady, Hillary Clinton.

On September 17, 2013, Lang released his first studio album in seven years, Fight for My Soul.

Signs was released in September 2017.

As of 2017, Lang's band line up was Barry Alexander on drums, Jim Anton on bass, Tyrus Sass on keyboards and Zane Carney on rhythm guitar.

On January 12, 2021, Lang announced that all confirmed concert dates were canceled until further notice because of a medical issue that affects Lang's singing.

== Musical equipment ==
On his pedalboard for his 2014 tour was the Analog Man King of Tone, a Whirlwind The Bomb boost, a Visual Sound V2 Route 808, a Fulltone Ultimate Octave, a JAM Pedals Tube Dreamer, and a Boss AW-3 Dynamic Wah. On this tour, he played his Custom Shop Tele and the 1958 reissue Custom Shop Gibson Les Paul through a pair of modified Fender ’65 Deluxe Reverb amps.

The guitar featured on the cover of Lie to Me is not a Telecaster but an original Fender Esquire. Upon filming the music video for the title track "Lie to Me" which took place in a San Francisco music store, the store owner suggested Lang play the Esquire in the video. Lang fell in love with the guitar and it was purchased and given to him as a gift. He continues to use it, but not as often as his Custom Shop Telecaster and Signature Series Les Paul.

== Personal life ==
=== Family ===
Lang married former Kids Incorporated cast member Haylie Johnson on June 8, 2001, making him the brother-in-law of actress Ashley Johnson. Lang and his wife share the same birthday, although she is one year older. They live in Los Angeles and have five children. They separated in 2025.

Lang has two older sisters, Stephanie and Heidi Jo. He has one younger sister, Jessica "Jesse" Langseth, who was a contestant on season 8 of American Idol.

=== Conversion to Christianity ===
Lang became a Christian in 2000. In an interview with Sara Groves in Christianity Today, Lang gave details about his conversion, assuring her that he had had a supernatural experience with the Holy Ghost. In his own words, he has said that he formerly "hated Christianity" and "despised the things of God", but now he wants to share with others about Jesus' love.

The songs "Only a Man" and "Thankful" from his album Turn Around, are about his belief in God. He has also co-written a couple of songs with contemporary Christian music artist Steven Curtis Chapman, including "My Love Remains".

== Discography ==
=== Studio albums ===
- Smokin' (1995)
- Lie to Me (1997)
- Wander This World (1998)
- Long Time Coming (2003)
- Turn Around (2006)
- Fight for My Soul (2013)
- Signs (2017)

=== Live albums ===
- Live at the Ryman (2009)

=== Guest appearances ===
- 1997: A Very Special Christmas 3 album - by various artists, performed on track "Santa Claus Is Back in Town".
- 1998: Blues Brothers 2000 original soundtrack - by various artists, performed on track "634–5789".
- 1998: Heavy Love album - by Buddy Guy, performed on track "Midnight Train".
- 1999: Loud Guitars, Big Suspicions album - by Shannon Curfman, performed on multiple tracks and co-wrote "Love Me Like That".
- 1999: For Love of the Game original soundtrack, performed on track "Paint It Black".
- 2000: It Ain't Nothin' But the Blues original cast recording, performed on tracks "Someone Else is Steppin' In" and "The Thrill is Gone".
- 2000: This Time Around album by Hanson, performed on tracks "You Never Know," "Runaway Run," and "Hand in Hand."
- 2000: Milk Cow Blues album - by Willie Nelson, performed on tracks "Rainy Day Blues" and "Ain't Nobody's Business".
- 2001: Been a Long Time album - by Double Trouble, performed on track "Ground Hog Day" with Gordie Johnson of Big Sugar.
- 2001: Ash Wednesday Blues album - by Anders Osborne, performed on tracks "Snake Bit Again", "Soul Livin'", "Me & Lola", "Aim Way High", and "Improvise".
- 2004: All Things New album - by Steven Curtis Chapman, performed on track "Only Getting Started".
- 2004: Eric Clapton: Crossroads Guitar Festival, performed on track "Give Me Up Again".
- 2005: Possibilities album - by Herbie Hancock, performed on track "When Love Comes to Town" with Joss Stone.
- 2007: A Deeper Level album - by Israel Houghton, performed on track "You Are Not Forgotten".
- 2009: Oh Happy Day album - by various artists, performed on track "I Believe" with the Fisk Jubilee Singers Lang performed the song live on The Tonight Show with Jay Leno on April 16, 2009.
- 2009: Lines, Vines and Trying Times album - by Jonas Brothers, performed on track "Hey Baby".
- 2010: Up Close album - by Eric Johnson, performed on track "Austin".
- 2010: What We Want, What We Get album - by Dave Barnes, performed on track "What I Need".
- 2010: 6 String Theory album - by Lee Ritenour, performed on track "Why I Sing The Blues" with B.B. King and Vince Gill.
- 2010: Memphis Blues album - by Cyndi Lauper, performed on tracks "How Blue Can You Get?" and "Crossroads".
- 2010: Guitar Heaven: The Greatest Guitar Classics of All Time album - by Santana, performed on track "I Ain't Superstitious".
- 2010: Eric Clapton: Crossroads Guitar Festival 2010 album - by various artists, performed on tracks "Five Long Years" and "Miss You" with Buddy Guy and Ronnie Wood.
- 2011: ZZ Top: A Tribute from Friends album - by various artists, performed on track "Sharp Dressed Man" as the M.O.B. with Mick Fleetwood, Steven Tyler and John McVie.
- 2012: Featuring Mato Nanji album - by Indigenous, performed on track "Free Yourself, Free Your Mind".
- 2012: Show Me Love album - by V Reyes, performed on track "Man Enough", also featuring Tim Lang.
- 2013: Still Climbing album - by Leslie West, performed on track "When a Man Loves a Woman."
- 2020* "Season of Peace-Christmas Collection" album-by Michael McDonald, performed on track "White Christmas/Winter Wonderland"
- 2021: "Celebrate the Music of Peter Green And The Early Years of Fleetwood Mac" album- by Mick Fleetwood & Friends, performed on tracks "Homework", "Need Your Love So Bad" and "Sandy Mary"
- 2022: "Speed of Light" album- by Skunk Baxter, performed on track "I Can Do Without"

== Filmography ==
- 1997: Late Night with Conan O'Brien - 1 episode, uncredited performer
- 1998: Blues Brothers 2000 - the custodian
- 1998: The Drew Carey Show - episode "In Ramada Da Vida" (cameo)
- 2008: Jonny Lang Live at Montreux 1999 DVD
