= Cindy Morgan (singer) =

American singer

- Born: Cindy Lavonne Morgan; June 4, 1968 (age 57)
- Origin: Harrogate, Tennessee, U.S.
- Genres: Contemporary Christian music
- Occupations: Singer, songwriter
- Instruments: Vocals, piano
- Years active: 1992–present
- Website: cindymorganmusic.com

Cindy Lavonne Morgan (born June 4, 1968) is an American contemporary Christian music singer and songwriter.

Morgan's 1992 debut album, Real Life, had six Dove Award nominations. Her follow-up, A Reason to Live, was also nominated for a Dove Award. In 1993, she was named new artist of the year by the Gospel Music Association.

Morgan has worked with a vocal coach to make her singing clearer.

Using her married name (Brouwer), Morgan is one half of the duo St. Lola in the Fields with Jeremy Bose. They released High Atop the Houses and the Towns on October 5, 2010 via Nettwerk.

In 2012, Morgan worked with singer/songwriter Andrew Greer on Food for the Hungry's "Hymns for Hunger" Tour, helping raise awareness and resources for local and international hunger relief organizations at tour stops across the country.

Morgan has two daughters with her ex-husband, Canadian author Sigmund Brouwer.

== Discography ==
- Real Life (1992)
- A Reason to Live (1993)
- Under the Waterfall (1995)
- Listen (1996)
- The Loving Kind (1998)
- The Best So Far (2000)
- Elementary (2001)
- Postcards (2006)
- The Definitive Collection (2007)
- Beautiful Bird (2008)
- Some Glad Morning: Hymns & Spirituals (2010)
- Bows & Arrows (2015)
- Autumn & Eve: Old Testaments, Volume 1 (2019)
- Operation Song: Friday Sessions (2020)
- The Sounds of Jubilee (2023)
