= Brent Bourgeois =

American rock musician (born 1958)

- Born: Brent Thomas Bourgeois; June 16, 1958 (age 68)
- Origin: New Jersey and Dallas, Texas, U.S.
- Genres: Pop, contemporary Christian
- Occupations: Singer, songwriter

Brent Thomas Bourgeois (born June 16, 1958) is an American rock musician, songwriter, and producer. He was co-leader of the band Bourgeois Tagg with Larry Tagg, and has released several solo albums. His later work has been classified in the genres pop and contemporary Christian music.

== Early life ==
Born in New Orleans, Louisiana, Bourgeois grew up in New Jersey and Dallas, Texas. He moved with Tagg to California's Bay Area after high school, and in the late 1970s they played in a Sacramento band named Uncle Rainbow, which included members from Texas and other parts of the South of the United States.

== Music career ==
=== Bourgeois Tagg ===
In 1984, Bourgeois and Larry Tagg moved to Sacramento and formed Bourgeois Tagg with guitarist Lyle Workman, drummer Michael Urbano, and keyboardist Scott Moon. Bourgeois played keyboards, Tagg played bass, and both shared lead vocal duties.

Their debut album Bourgeois Tagg was produced by David J. Holman and spawned two singles, "Mutual Surrender (What a Wonderful World)" a number 62 hit on the Billboard Hot 100 and "The Perfect Life". In 1987, Bourgeois Tagg recorded Yoyo with producer Todd Rundgren. It was released in autumn, and the band had what would prove to be their biggest hit with its first single "I Don't Mind at All", which peaked at number 38 on the Billboard Hot 100, and made the top 40 in Canada and the UK.

=== Solo career ===
After Bourgeois Tagg split up, Bourgeois signed a solo recording deal with Virgin imprint Charisma Records. His self-titled album was released in 1990. Five songs on the album were co-produced by rock veteran Danny Kortchmar and five co-produced by David J. Holman. Brent Bourgeois featured guest appearances by Christine McVie and Rick Vito of Fleetwood Mac, and Randy Jackson, among others. The first single "Dare to Fall in Love", in spite of a video that received a moderate amount of play (especially on VH1), became only a minor hit on the Pop charts (#23 US Radio and Records, #31 US Hot 100 (Whitburn, Joel (1994). Top Pop Singles 1955-1993. Menomonee Falls WI: Radio Research Inc. p. 62.), #23 Canada), though it did climb to #7 on the US Adult Contemporary chart. The track "Can't Feel the Pain" was co-written with former bandmate Lyle Workman, who also plays guitar on the song; it subsequently managed to peak at #28 on the AC chart. The album also featured a cover version of the Zombies' "Time of the Season"; it achieved a bit-higher peak on the AC chart at #22. Ultimately, the album did not sell well.

1992 saw the release of A Matter of Feel. Virtually ignored by all radio and video outlets, the album fell on deaf ears and sold even less than its predecessor. The track "I'm Down with You" was co-written with Robert Palmer. Bourgeois parted ways with Charisma shortly thereafter.

In 1994 he returned with another solo album, Come Join the Living World (produced by Charlie Peacock)—this time on Reunion Records, a Contemporary Christian label—and a renewed, more literal focus on Christian themes, which he has maintained throughout his career ever since. The album spawned four No. 1 songs on Christian radio.

On June 2, 2014, Bourgeois released Don't Look Back, his first album in twenty years, and his first pop outing since A Matter of Feel. Guest artists included Julian Lennon, Todd Rundgren, and the album even served as an unofficial reunion for Bourgeois Tagg, who played on the song "Psycho."

=== Production and management ===
Between 1994 and 2002, Bourgeois worked in the contemporary Christian music world performing both songwriting and production work for acts such as Michael W. Smith, Jars of Clay, 4Him, Anointed, Jaci Velasquez, Michelle Tumes, and Cindy Morgan. He was the vice-president of A&R at Word Records in Nashville from 1997 to 2001, signing Nicole C. Mullen and Rachael Lampa.

== Personal life ==
Bourgeois is married, has four children and resides in Elk Grove, California.
