= Drew and Shannon =

American Record Producing Duo

Drew and Shannon is an American record producer and songwriting duo, from Nashville, Tennessee, United States.

== Collaboration ==
Drew Ramsey and Shannon Sanders met while both were on the Contemporary Christian music circuit. Finding common interest in R&B they began to write together. Shannon plays trumpet and keyboard, while Drew plays bass and guitar. They have been working together for over 15 years and both live in Nashville, Tennessee, US.

== Career ==
Ramsey and Sanders began writing and working together and ended up creating Sanders' album "Outta Nowhere." Although the disc was released on the tiny Southern Way Records, it earned good reviews and caught the attention of in-the-know R&B fans. The Arista Records band Next decided to work with Sanders and Ramsey as a result of the disc. More importantly, though, the disc found its way to Atlanta-based R&B vocalist India.Arie, who had just been signed to Universal Records. She brought her mother and the executive who signed her to Universal to Ramsey's house to talk about writing songs together.

Drew and Shannon are co-writers of "Good Man," 2003 Grammy nominated for Best R&B Song and co-producers on the album Voyage to India, 2003 Grammy winner for Best R&B album. Both the song and album are performed by India.Arie.

They continued to work with many other artists the next couple of years, such as Mark Broussard, Jesse McCartney, and Heather Headley, before hitting it big again with another Grammy-winning Best Rock Gospel album with Jonny Lang's Turn Around.

From then they have written and produced many records with many major label artist including: Robert Randolph, Mandisa, David Archuleta, John Legend.

== Cuttystang Records ==
In November 2009, Drew and Shannon decided to try a new venture and start a record label, Cuttystang Records. Their first releases being Rachael Lampa's "Human" and Britten's "Six Strings and a Drum Machine". Both of these albums have seen rave reviews.

== Discography ==
- Jonny Lang - Signs - producers
- Miyavi - The Others - producers
- Britten - "Six Strings and a Drum Machine" (January 2010)- Writers and Producers entire project.
- Rachael Lampa - "Human" (January 2010)- Produced entire project.
- India.Arie- Testimony: Vol. 2, Love & Politics (February 10, 2009)- "The Ghetto" Writers/Producers, "Yellow" Writers
- Various Artists- Oh Happy Day! (March 31, 2009)- "I Believe" (Featuring Jonny Lang and The Fisk Jubilee Singers) Producers
- David Archuleta- David Archuleta (November 11, 2008)- "Works For Me" Producers
- John Legend - Evolver (October 28, 2008) - "Good Morning" Writers/Producers
- Mandisa - True Beauty (July 31, 2007)- "True Beauty" Writers/Producers, "Oh, My Lord" Producers
- Robert Randolph - Colorblind (September 26, 2006)- "Ain't Nothin' Wrong With That","Homecoming" Writers/Producers
- Jonny Lang - Turn Around (September 19, 2006)- Producers/Writers for entire project
- Jesse McCartney - Right Where You Want Me (September 19, 2006)- "Daddy's Little Girl" Writers/Producers
- India.Arie – Testimony (June 27, 2006)- "I Am Not My Hair", "Summer", "Better People", "Good Mourning" Writers/Producers
- Heather Headley - In My Mind (January 31, 2006)- "In My Mind" Writers/Producers
- Eric Benét - Hurricane (June 21, 2005)- "I Know" Writers/ Producers
- Nicole C. Mullen - Everyday People (September 14, 2004)- "Dancin' in the Rain" Writers/Producers
- Marc Broussard - Carencro (August 3, 2004)- "Home" Writers
- The Temptations - Legacy (June 2004)- "Stay Together" Writers/Producers
- Kimberley Locke - One Love (May 4, 2004)- "I Can't Make You Love Me", "It's Alright" Producers "You've Changed" Writers/Producers
- India.Arie - Voyage to India (September 24, 2002) - "The Truth", "Talk to Her", "Get It Together", "God Is Real”, "Slow Down", "Good Man" Writers/ Producers
- India.Arie - We Were Soldiers ST (February 26, 2002)- "Good Man" Writers/Producers
- Next - Welcome II Nextasy (June 20, 2000)- "Call on Me" Writers/ Producers
