= Geoff Foster (sound engineer) =

English recording & mix engineer (born 1965)

- Born: 5 May 1965 (age 61); London, England
- Genres: Film, classical pop, rock
- Occupations: Audio Engineering, Audio mixing (recorded music)
- Years active: 1987–present

Geoff Foster is an English recording and mix engineer, best known for his work on numerous film scores.

== History ==
Foster joined George Martin's AIR Studios in 1987 after graduating from Brunel University with a 2.1 degree in Electronic Engineering. In 1994, shortly after AIR made its historic move to Lyndhurst Hall, Hampstead, he was made Chief Engineer. Having trained under George Martin's engineers he came to prominence as an engineer himself collaborating with David Arnold on the film Stargate (1994) which broke box office records upon its release.

In 2000, his work with Björk was nominated for Academy Award for Best Original Song, Golden Globe Award for Best Original Song and Chicago Film Critics Association Award for Best Original Score.

In 2001, he received a Grammy for his work on Joni Mitchell's album Both Sides Now. In 2005, he received a Grammy for his work on the soundtrack for the biopic film Ray. In 2008, he received a Grammy for his work on the soundtrack for the film The Dark Knight. In 2021, he recorded the orchestra for the Grammy winning James Bond theme song No Time to Die by Billie Eilish and in 2023, won his 5th Grammy for Vince Mendoza's Songbird (Orchestral version).

In 2002, he won a Golden Reel award for his work on the score of Focus.

In 2007, Foster was taken on by the newly formed AIR Management after the sale of AIR Studios to Strongroom's owner Richard Boote. Throughout 2010, Foster has been an ambassador for Phillips Obsessed with sound product range. In 2011, he was awarded a BASCA gold badge for services to the music industry. In 2012, he won "Engineer of the Year" awarded by The Music Producer's Guild (MPG). In 2012, Foster worked on Life of Pi, which won an Academy Award for best score in 2013.

Foster's numerous film projects over recent years include The Dark Knight, Black Swan (film), Inception, Nocturnal Animals, Dunkirk and Elvis.

== Filmography ==
- Stargate (1994)
- Black Beauty (1994)
- Don Juan DeMarco (1994)
- When a Man Loves a Woman (1994)
- Jack and Sarah (1995)
- Last of the Dogmen (1995)
- Restoration (1995)
- Une femme française (1995)
- Gold Diggers: The Secret of Bear Mountain (1995)
- Mrs. Winterbourne (1996)
- Hamlet (1996)
- James and the Giant Peach (1996)
- Romeo + Juliet (1996)
- Star Wars: Shadows of the Empire (1996)
- D3: The Mighty Ducks (1996)
- The Peacemaker (1997)
- Robinson Crusoe (1997)
- Photographing Fairies (1997)
- Meet Wally Sparks (1997)
- Perdita Durango / Dance with the Devil (1997)
- Swept from the Sea (1997)
- The Wings of the Dove (1997)
- The Matchmaker (1997)
- The Visitor (1997)
- Tomorrow Never Dies (1997)
- Smilla's Sense of Snow (1997)
- The Other Conquest (1997 / 2007)
- The Place of Lions
- B. Monkey (1998)
- Prince Of Egypt (1998)
- City of Angels (film) (1998)
- Cousin Bette (film) (1998)
- Great Expectations (1998)
- What Dreams May Come (1998)
- The Avengers (1998)
- The Bone Collector (1999)
- Summer of Sam (1999)
- Plunkett & Macleane (1999)
- The Loss of Sexual Innocence (1999)
- Pola X (1999)
- Dreaming of Joseph Lees (1999)
- Entrapment (1999)
- Eye of the Beholder (1999)
- Mickey Blue Eyes (1999)
- A Midsummer Night's Dream (1999)
- Ride With The Devil (1999)
- Wing Commander (1999)
- The War Zone (1999)
- The World Is Not Enough (1999)
- The Insider (1999)
- The Last September (1999)
- Dancer In The Dark (2000)
- Bamboozled (2000)
- Born Romantic (2000)
- Circus (2000)
- Jason and the Argonauts (2000)
- There's Only One Jimmy Grimble (2000)
- Lost Souls (2000)
- Mission: Impossible 2 (2000)
- The Beach (2000)
- Moulin Rouge! (2001)
- Mr In-Between (2001)
- Shrek (2001)
- Monkeybone (2001)
- Kiss of the Dragon (2001)
- Just Visiting (Les Visiteurs 2 ) 2001
- Comment j'ai tue mon pere (How I killed my father) (2001)
- The Others (2001)
- The Muskateer (2001)
- Die Another Day (2002)
- Close Your Eyes (2002)
- The Magdalene Sisters (2002)
- Changing Lanes (2002)
- Below (film) (2002)
- Between Strangers (2002)
- About A Boy (2002)
- Focus (2002)
- Gangs Of New York (2002)
- The Quiet American (2002)
- The Ring (2002)
- Spirit: Stallion of the Cimarron (2002)
- Thunderpants (2002)
- Swept Away (2002)
- 101 Dalmatians II: Patch's London Adventure (2003)
- 25th Hour (2003)
- Hope Springs (film) (2003)
- The Sleeping Dictionary (2003)
- It's All About Love (2003)
- Ned Kelly (2003)
- Effroyables Jardins (Strange Gardens) (2003)
- The Boys From County Clare (2003)
- Love Actually (2003)
- Les Demoiselles De Rochefort (Re-Record) (2003)
- Pirates of the Caribbean: The Curse of the Black Pearl (2003)
- Secondhand Lions (2003)
- The Statement (2003)
- A Different Loyalty (2003)
- The Threat (Hotet) (2004)
- Silmido (film) (2003)
- The Order / The Sin Eater (2003)
- Octane (2003)
- Little Britain (14 Episodes) (2003–2005)
- Ray (2004)
- Tropic Island Hum (2004)
- Beyond the Sea (2004)
- Prince and Me (2004)
- One Perfect Day (2004)
- She Hate Me (2004)
- The Clearing (2004)
- Thunderbirds (2004)
- In My Father's Den (2004)
- King Arthur (2004)
- Alien V Predator (2004)
- Shark Tale (2004)
- Pooh's Heffalump Movie (2005)
- The River King (2005)
- Kingdom Of Heaven (2005)
- D'Artagnan et les trois mousquetaires
- Naboer / Next Door (UK) (2005)
- Ring 2 (2005)
- Madagascar (2005)
- Mother of Mine (Äideistä parhain) (2005)
- All the Invisible Children (2005)
- Stoned (2005)
- The Curse of the Were-Rabbit (2005)
- Magnificent Desolation: Walking on the Moon 3D (2005)
- Asylum (2005)
- The Rocket Post (2006)
- Mrs Henderson Presents (2006)
- Renaissance (2006)
- Half Light (2006)
- Batman Begins (2006)
- The Thief Lord (2006)
- Doom (2005)
- Curious George (film) (2006)
- Copying Beethoven (2006)
- When a Stranger Calls (2006)
- The Fountain (2006)
- Free Jimmy (2006)
- The Da Vinci Code (film) (2006)
- The Last King of Scotland (2006)
- Open Season (2006)
- Pirates of the Caribbean: Dead Man's Chest (2006)
- Astronaut Farmer (2006)
- Amazing Grace (2006)
- World Trade Center (2006)
- Smoking Aces (2006)
- Windkracht 10: Koksijde Rescue (2006)
- Casino Royale (2006)
- Blood Diamond (2006)
- The Year Of The Wolf (Suden Vuosi) (2007)
- Hot Fuzz (2007)
- Quest for a heart (Rölli) (2007)
- Elvis and Anabelle (2007)
- A Secret (2007)
- Daddy Day Camp (2007)
- Pirates of the Caribbean: At World's End (2007)
- Lady Godiva (2007)
- The Water Horse (2007)
- Arn – The Knight Templar (2007)
- Bee Movie (2007)
- The Great Debators (2007)
- Transformers (2007)
- Sweeney Todd: The Demon Barber of Fleet Street (2007)
- Fly Me to The Moon (2008)
- Mongol (2008)
- Elizabeth: The Golden Age (2008)
- 10,000 BC
- Definitely, Maybe (2008)
- Alien Love Triangle (2008)
- Caught in the Act (2008)
- How to Lose Friends & Alienate People (2008)
- Iron Man (2008)
- My Zinc Bed (2008)
- The Dark Knight (2008)
- The Wrestler (2008)
- Madagascar: Escape 2 Africa (2008)
- Quantum of Solace (2008)
- An American Girl: Chrissa Stands Strong (Girl of the Year) (2009)
- Angels & Demons (2009)
- Moon (2009)
- Blood: The Last Vampire (2009)
- State of Play (2009)
- Rebound (2009)
- Farewell (L'affaire Farewell) (2009)
- The Invention of Lying (This Side of The Truth) (2009)
- Sherlock Holmes (2009)
- Transformers: Revenge of the Fallen (2009)
- Last Night (2010)
- Sammy's Adventures: The Secret Passage (2010)
- The Book of Eli (2010)
- The Italian Key (2011)
- Made in Dagenham (2010)
- One Night In Jordan: A Concert For Peace (2010)
- Clash Of The Titans (2010)
- Inception (2010)
- Morning Glory (2010)
- Despicable Me (2010)
- The First Grader (2010)
- Love & Other Drugs (2010)
- The Chronicles of Narnia: The Voyage of the Dawn Treader (2010)
- Black Swan (film) (2010)
- Tron: Legacy (2010)
- Enthiran (2010)
- Faster (2010)
- Hella W (2011)
- Paul (2011)
- Rango (2011)
- United (2011)
- Pirates of the Caribbean: On Stranger Tides (2011)
- Beneath the Darkness (2011)
- Kull of Atlantis (2011)
- Captain America (2011)
- Ghost Recon (2011)
- Transformers: Dark of the Moon (2011)
- Immortals (2011)
- A Very Harold & Kumar Christmas (2011)
- On ne choisit pas sa famille (You Don't Choose Your Family) (2011)
- Sherlock Holmes: A Game of Shadows (2011)
- The Raven (2012)
- Dolphin Tale (2011)
- The Dark Knight Rises (2012)
- Contraband (2012)
- Red Lights (2012)
- Madagascar 3: Europe's Most Wanted (2012)
- Safe House (2012)
- The Great Gatsby (2013)
- Filth (film) (2013)
- And So It Goes (film) (2013)
- Kochadaiyaan the legend (2013)
- Evil Dead (2013)
- Prisoners (2013)
- RoboCop (2014)
- Le crocodile du Botswanga (2014)
- Pompeii (film) (2014)
- Noah (2014)
- The Legend of Hercules (2014)
- Kochadaiiyaan (2014)
- Interstellar (film) (2014)
- The Hundred-Foot Journey (film) (2014)
- Exodus: Gods and Kings (2014)
- Gone Girl (film) (2014)
- Penguins of Madagascar (2014)
- Muhammad: The Messenger of God (film) (2015)
- Dough (film) (2015)
- Strange Magic (film) (2015)
- Home (2015 film) (2015)
- Victor Frankenstein (film) (2015)
- The Little Prince (2015 film) (2015)
- High-Rise (film) (2015)
- Terminator Genisys (2015)
- Man Down (film) (2015)
- Snowden (film) (2016)
- Kung Fu Panda 3 (2016)
- Me Before You (film) (2016)
- 13 Hours: The Secret Soldiers of Benghazi (2016)
- Emperor (film, 2016)
- The Siege of Jadotville (film) (2016)
- Nocturnal Animals (2016)
- Bridget Jones's Baby (2016)
- Emerald City (TV series) (2016)
- La porta rossa (2017)
- Ghost in the Shell (2017 film) (2017)
- The Boss Baby (2017)
- Dunkirk (2017 film) (2017)
- The Adventurers (2017 film) (2017)
- Loving Vincent (2017)
- Only the Brave (2017 film) (2017)
- Mute (2017 film) (2017)
- Wolf Warriors 2 (2017)
- Omerta (2017)
- The Mercy (2018)
- Mute (2018)
- Mary Magdalene (2018)
- Hunter Killer (2018)
- Adrift (2018)
- Mission Impossible:The Fallout (2018)
- Out Of Blue (2018)
- Happy New Year, Colin (2018)
- The Kid Who Would Be King (2019)
- The Warrior Queen of Jhansi (2019)
- Asura (2019)
- Oh Mercy! (2019)
- Balance, Not Symmetry (2019)
- The Art Of Racing In The Rain (2019)
- Judy (2019)
- The King (2019)
- Gemini Man (2019)
- Fanny Ly'd (2019)
- 6 Underground (2019)
- When Hitler Stole (2019)
- Summerland (2020)
- The Stonghold (2020)
- Rebecca (2020)
- Rebecca (2020)
- In the Earth (2021)
- SAS: Red Notice (2021)
- Cruella (film) (2021)
- The Boss Baby: Family Business (2021)
- She Will (film) (2021)
- No Time to Die (2021)
- Elvis (2022 film) (2022)
- Ticket to Paradise (2022 film) (2022)
- Carmen (2022 film) (2022)
- All Quiet on the Western Front (2022 film) (2022)
- She Said (film) (2022)
- Lamborghini (2022)
- Sharper (2023)
- Luther: The Fallen Sun (2023)
- The Three Musketeers: D'Artagnan (2023)
- Gridman Universe (2023)
- Are You There God? It's Me, Margaret. (film) (2023)
- Mission: Impossible – Dead Reckoning Part One (2023)
- Barbie (film) (2023)
- The Peasants (2023 film) (2023)
- The Creator (2023 film) (2023)
- The Book of Clarence (2023)
- The Three Musketeers: Milady (2023)
- Love Lies Bleeding (2024 film) (2024)
- Kung Fu Panda 4 (2024)
- Damsel (film) (2024)
- The Count of Monte Cristo (2024 film) (2024)
- The Supremes at Earl's All-You-Can-Eat (2024)

== Discography ==
- Akin - Ates Ve Su
- Alisha's Attic - "Alisha Rules the World", "Air We Breathe"
- All Saints - Pure Shores (Soundtrack -The Beach)
- Amici Forever - Defined
- Andrew Lloyd Webber - Eng Album Love Never Dies
- Angelis - Angelis
- Bjork (compilation) - Surrounded
- Björk - Brodsky Quartet Union Chapel
- Björk - tracks Selmasongs (Soundtrack-Dancer In the Dark)
- Blur - On Your Own (Soundtrack -The Beach)
- Cast - Magic Hour
- Cilla Black - Cilla’s World
- Coldstream Guards - Heroes
- Craig Armstrong - As If Nothing Works
- Craig Armstrong - Filmworks
- Craig Armstrong - Forthcoming Album
- Craig Armstrong - Pianoworks
- Craig Armstrong - The Space Between Us
- Crowded House - Together Alone
- Daniel Lévi - L’Amour Qu’il Faut
- Dario Gand & Vanessa Quinones - Voices (Soundtrack-The Beach)
- David Arnold - Shaken & Stirred (007 Title Songs)
- David Cassidy & Petula Clarke - Blood Brothers
- David Essex - At The Movies
- David McAlmont - Surrender (Soundtrack-Tomorrow Never Dies)
- Debbie Gibson - Think With Your Heart
- Deborah Harry (with John Williams) - Debravation
- Desree - I'm Kissing You (Soundtrack-Romeo & Juliet)
- Eliza Carthay - Angels & Cigarettes
- Elkie Brooks & Royal Philharmonic - Amazing
- Enrique Iglesias & Lionel Richie - To Love A Woman
- Era - Very Best of Era
- Eros Ramazzotti - E2
- Fat Les - "Vin-Da-Loo"
- Filippa Giordano - Ill Rosso Amore
- Fine Young Cannibals - Tell Me What
- Frederick - Piano
- Gallows - Just Because You Sleep Next Me.
- Garbage - The World Is Not Enough (Soundtrack-The World Is Not Enough)
- George Harrison - Concert for George Harrison
- George Martin - In My Life
- Gilbert O'Sullivan - Caricature:The Box
- Gioaria - Like A Dream
- Grace Jones - Storm (Soundtrack-Eye Of The Beholder)
- Hombres G - Esta Es Tu Vida
- Hombres G - Peligrosamente Juntos
- Hombres G - Peligrosamente Juntos
- Hothouse Flowers - Home
- Il Divo - Eng Album Siempre
- Il Divo - The Promise
- Irene Barnes - Time
- Jakatta - Visions
- Jethro Tull - Catfish Rising
- Jimmy Nail - Eng Big River
- John Martyn & Phil Collins - Couldn't Love You More
- John Martyn & Phil Collins - No Little Boy
- Jon Hopkins - Art of Chill 2
- Joni Mitchell - Both Sides Now
- Joni Mitchell - Travelogue
- José Carreras - Hollywood Golden Classics
- José Carreras - José Carreras Sings Andrew Lloyd Webber
- José Carreras - Passion
- Kaiser Chiefs - Off With Their Heads
- Katherine Jenkins - Diva
- Katherine Jenkins - Living A Dream
- Katherine Jenkins - Serenade
- Killer Instinct - Soundtrack for computer Game
- Knebworth 90 - Live concert MTV broadcast
- Lance Ellington with John Wilson & his Orchestra - Lessons In Love
- Leftfield - Snakeblood (Soundtrack-The Beach)
- Leona Lewis - Spirit
- Leona Lewis - Moment Like This
- Lesley Garratt - Platinum Collection
- Luis Miguel - Mis Romances Mis Boleros
- Madonna - American Life
- Madonna - Music
- Madonna - Die Another Day
- Maestro Hattori - Loe
- Maestro Hattori - Maestro
- Michael Ball - I Dreamed A Dream
- Mike Oldfield - The Millennium Bell
- Ofra Haza - Deliver Us (Soundtrack-Prince Of Egypt)
- Paul Brady - Trick Or Treat
- Paul Carrack - A Different Hat
- Paul Potts - One Chance
- Peter Cincotti - East of Angel Town
- Petshop Boys - Nightlife
- Petshop Boys - Popart
- Petshop Boys - You Only Tell Me You Love When You're Drunk
- Pope John Paul II - Santo Subito
- Pulp - We Love Life
- Radiohead - Talkshow Host (Soundtrack-Romeo & Juliet)
- Rhydian - Rhydian
- Roachford - Get Ready!
- Robert Palmer - Ridin High
- Rockstar Supernova - Rockstar Supernova
- Ronan Tynan - Ronan
- Rory McLeod - Footsteps And Heartbeats
- Rumer - Boys Don't Cry
- Sandi Patty - Take Hold Of Christ
- Scott Walker - Drift
- Sean Ruane - Forthcoming
- Shayne Ward - Shayne Ward
- Shirley Bassey - Thank You For The Years
- Siphowo Ntshebe - Hope
- The Sisters of Mercy - "Dominion"
- Smash!! - "Freeway"
- Squadronaires - In The Mood: The Glenn Miller Songbook
- Stephen Duffy & Nigel Kennedy - Music In Colours
- Sting - Brand New Day
- Sugar Ray - Spinning Mary (Soundtrack-The Beach)
- The The - "Beaten Generation" (backing voicals)
- Twentieth-Century Blues - The Songs of Noel Coward
- Various Artists - Voices From The FIFA World Cup
- Vince Mendoza & Christine McVie - Songbird (Orchestral Mix)
- Westlife - Love
- Will Young - From Now On
- Yusuf Islam - Forthcoming Album

== Awards ==
- Won: Oscar Award - Music Original Score – "All Quiet on the Western Front" (2022)
- Won: Grammy Award – Best Traditional Pop Vocal Album – Joni Mitchell's Both Sides Now (2000)
- Won: Grammy Award – Best Score Soundtrack Album For Motion Picture, Television Or Other Visual Media – Ray Official Soundtrack (2005)
- Won: Grammy Award – Best Score Soundtrack Album For Motion Picture, Television Or Other Visual Media – The Dark Knight Official Soundtrack (2008)
- Won: Grammy Awards - Best Song Written for Visual Media - Billie Eilish - No Time to Die (song) (2021)
- Won Grammy Awards - Best Arrangement, Instruments and Vocals - Vince Mendoza - Songbird (Orchestral Mix) (2023)
- Won: BAFTA Award – Anthony Asquith Award for Film Music – Moulin Rouge (2001)
- Won: BAFTA Award – Anthony Asquith Award for Original Score – All Quiet on the Western Front (2022)
- Won: Motion Picture Editors Guild – Golden Reel Award for Film Scoring – Focus (2001)
- Nominated: BAFTA Award – Anthony Asquith Award for Film Music – Casino Royale (2006)
- Nominated: BAFTA Award – Anthony Asquith Award for Film Music – Inception (2010)
- Nominated: Grammy Award – Best Song Written for Motion Picture, Television or Other Visual Media – You Know My Name from Casino Royale (2006)
- Nominated: Oscar Award – Music Original Score – "The Prince of Egypt" (1998)
- Nominated: Oscar Award – Music Original Score – "Sherlock Holmes" (2009)
- Nominated: Oscar Award – Music Original Score – "Inception" (2010)
- Nominated: Oscar Award – Music Original Song – Björk "Ive Seen it All" (2000)
