= Lindsey Buckingham Christine McVie =

Studio album by Lindsey Buckingham and Christine McVie
- Released: June 9, 2017
- Recorded: 2012–2017
- Studios: The Village Recorder (Los Angeles, California)
- Genres: Rock, pop rock
- Length: 39:36
- Labels: Atlantic; East West
- Producers: Lindsey Buckingham; Mitchell Froom; Mark Needham

Lindsey Buckingham chronology
One Man Show (2012)	Lindsey Buckingham Christine McVie (2017)	Solo Anthology: The Best of Lindsey Buckingham (2018)

Christine McVie chronology
In the Meantime (2004)	Lindsey Buckingham Christine McVie (2017)	Songbird (A Solo Collection) (2022)

Singles from Lindsey Buckingham Christine McVie
- 1. "In My World" Released: April 14, 2017; 2. "Feel About You" Released: April 27, 2017; 3. "Sleeping Around the Corner" Released: May 11, 2017; 4. "Lay Down for Free" Released: August 10, 2017

Lindsey Buckingham Christine McVie (also referred to as simply Buckingham McVie) is a studio album by Fleetwood Mac vocalists Lindsey Buckingham and Christine McVie, released on June 9, 2017. Four of the five "classic members" of Fleetwood Mac are featured on the album; vocalist Stevie Nicks is the sole member absent. The album was recorded at The Village Recorder, where Fleetwood Mac had recorded their Tusk album. Work on the album began soon after Christine McVie rejoined Fleetwood Mac in 2014 and resumed following the conclusion of the band's On with the Show tour. Lindsey Buckingham Christine McVie sold over 22,000 units in the United States in its first week and debuted within the top 20. It debuted at No. 5 in the United Kingdom and was certified silver in November 2017 for sales exceeding 60,000 units.

== Background ==
A few months after McVie rejoined Fleetwood Mac in 2014, she and Buckingham met at Studio D at the Village Recorder in Los Angeles, where the band recorded the Tusk album in 1979. Fleetwood Mac's rhythm section of Mick Fleetwood and John McVie played drums and bass for the sessions. Originally, the intention was not to record a full album, but rather to develop some of McVie's demos. In their earliest stages, McVie's demos consisted of her playing the piano while singing into a microphone. Buckingham reworked some of her demos at his home studio before meeting with McVie at the Village Recorder in Los Angeles. After two months, they had recorded eight songs that were roughly "75 percent done" according to Buckingham, including "Carnival Begin", "Too Far Gone" and "Red Sun".

Some of Buckingham's material originated from recording sessions involving himself, Fleetwood, and John McVie prior to Christine McVie's return to Fleetwood Mac. Three of the songs had been worked on with Mitchell Froom, which according to Mark Needham, who engineered the album with Buckingham, were "pretty advanced". These songs later received new vocals, some adjustments to the arrangements, and additional production work during the Lindsey Buckingham Christine McVie recording sessions. When accounting for the material with Froom, the two had around 14–15 songs to choose from by 2014. Recording was put on hold when Fleetwood Mac began preparations for their On with the Show tour. Over a year after the completion of the concert tour, the two decided revisit the songs from the initial recording sessions.

In 2015, Mick Fleetwood was still hopeful that Stevie Nicks would contribute songs for the project, stating that "My inclination is, the music will not be wasted. It will come out one way or another. I truly hope and I quietly believe it will be Fleetwood Mac, and Stevie will do some lovely stuff, and within the next couple of years we will get that done." However, Nicks revealed in 2016 that she was still undecided about recording another Fleetwood Mac album. McVie and Buckingham ultimately decided to proceed as a duo without Nicks. Work on the album resumed at the end of 2016, more than two years after the initial recording sessions.

== Recording and composition ==
During the album's early stages, McVie sent Buckingham raw demos to work on remotely. McVie also helped Buckingham develop his own compositions. "She would write lyrics and maybe paraphrase the melody — and come up with something far better than what I would have done if I'd taken it down the road myself." Two of those songs, "Red Sun" and "Too Far Gone", started off in this fashion. The lyrics to "Red Sun" were inspired by a trip McVie took to Africa, during which she wrote the words "When the red sun kisses the sea" on a beach. McVie then combined these lyrics with a chord progression and melody that Buckingham created.

With the exception of the three songs recorded with Froom, all of the songs on Lindsey Buckingham Christine McVie were recorded in the studio from scratch using the demos as references. Throughout the recording process, the mixes for each song would be saved and catalogued to document the track's progression, which would be referred to periodically to make decisions with the arrangements. Panning and EQ levels were established during this time, with Buckingham suggesting ideas on setting these parameters. One such as example was on "Feel About You", where Buckingham recommended the idea of having the song's backing vocals alternate between the left and right channels. Once the album was changed from a Fleetwood Mac album to duet album, more creative liberties were taken to the recording process, with Needham saying that "it freed us up to use more experimental recording methods, which we would not have done if it had turned into a Fleetwood Mac album." In some cases, the drums were a composite of multiple rhythm tracks, including loops of Fleetwood's live drumming.

"Sleeping Around the Corner", the album's opening track, was previously included as a bonus track on the US digital edition of Buckingham's 2011 solo album, Seeds We Sow. McVie took an immediate liking to the track, prompting Buckingham to finish the song. Unlike other songs on the album, "Sleeping Around the Corner" did not feature Fleetwood or John McVie on drums and bass; Buckingham handled those instruments instead. Another song, "Love Is Here to Stay", emerged from Buckingham's home studio; its lyrical themes addressed developments in Buckingham's personal life. "What had changed was I had got married and had kids and had a whole new set of things to write about. [This song] gets back to a single guitar doing the work of a whole track." McVie wrote "Game of Pretend" about a therapist who helped her overcome a fear of flying. "Carnival Begin" was also an autobiographical song that related to McVie rejoining Fleetwood Mac.

Most of Buckingham's guitars were recorded with a Fender Stratocaster into a Radial Firefly direct box that was fed directly into the recording console, which was a Neve 88R Desk. In certain instances, the guitar signals were also put through a 100-watt Wizard head, which was fed through a KK Audio 2x12 cabinet with Electro-Voice speakers. Buckingham also used a Roland VG-8 guitar synthesizer module for the guitar solos on "In My World", "Too Far Gone", and "Carnival Begin". McVie's primary keyboard instrument for the album was a Hammond B3 organ, which was recorded with Shure SM57 and Neumann U 87 microphones. The final mixdowns were completed at The Village Recorder and Red Oak Studios by Buckingham and Mark Needham, who had previously mixed Fleetwood Mac's Say You Will and Fleetwood Mac: Live in Boston albums.

== Release ==
On March 24, 2017, McVie announced that the album would see a worldwide launch on June 9, 2017, and would be available for purchase on "iTunes and vinyl – it will be available everywhere". The complete track list was released on April 11, 2017, with Buckingham releasing this joint statement: "We were exploring a creative process, and the identity of the project took on a life organically. The body of work felt like it was meant to be a duet album. We acknowledged that to each other on many occasions, and said to ourselves, 'What took us so long?!'" "In My World" was also released as a single on April 14 through streaming and digital services. While the single failed to make the UK Top 100, it did reach number 86 on the sales chart.

"Feel About You" was released on April 27 as a promotional single. Co-written by both Buckingham and McVie, Rolling Stone described the track as "bubbly pop-rock" in nature with a "jangly, infectious chorus". Buckingham confessed that "Feel About You" was primarily McVie's composition, but he altered it enough to warrant a co-writing credit.

Buckingham and McVie released a mini behind-the scenes documentary in May discussing the development of various tracks, including "On With the Show" and "Carnival Begin". McVie reflected on her experience in the studio coming out of her sabbatical from the music industry:

"For me, this is all a fresh beginning... I've rediscovered my love for writing and my love for music. It seemed to have evolved quite organically because I've been sending Lindsey some rough demos, and he's refined them and shaped them into some of our best material ever."

== Live performances ==
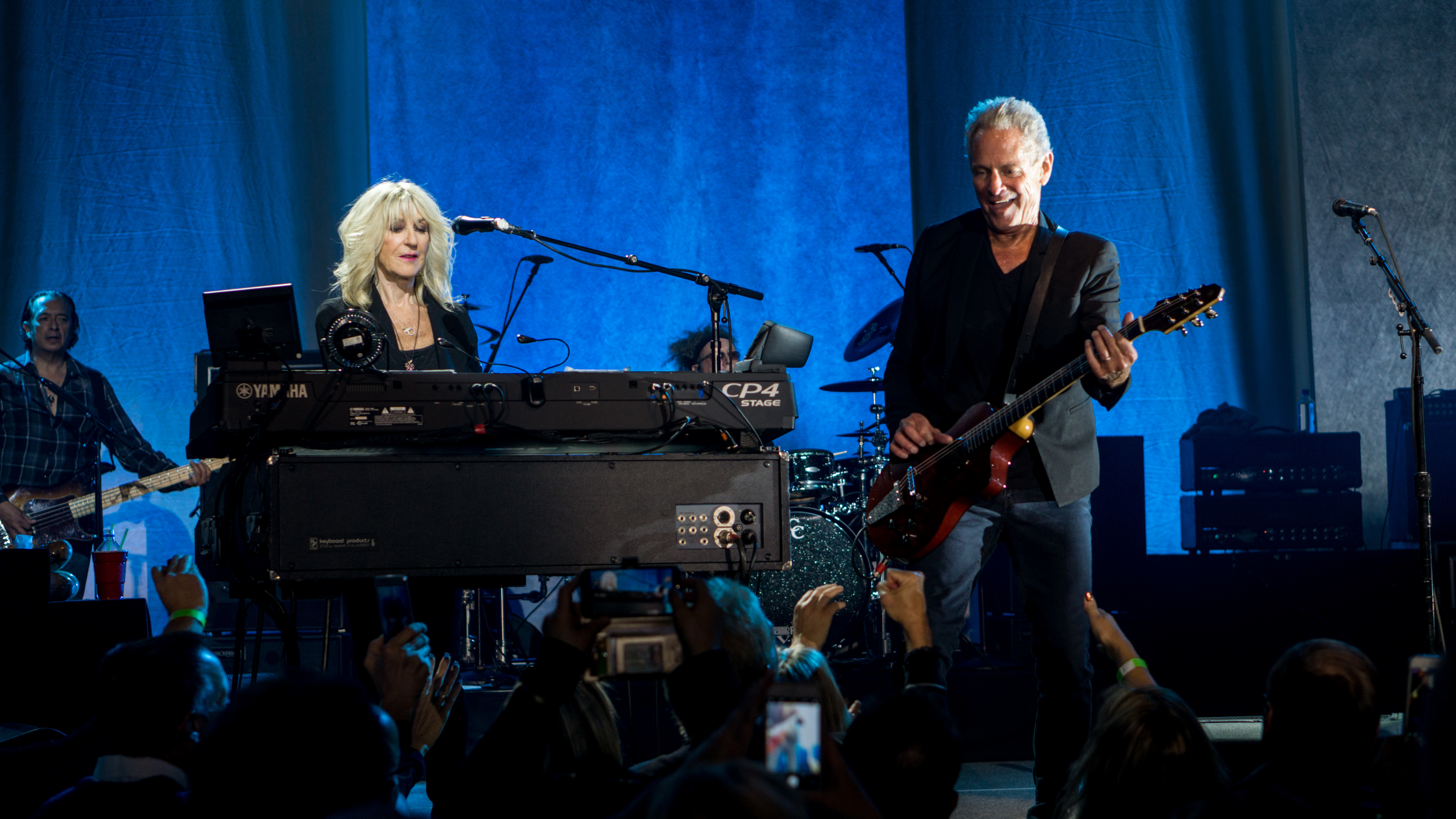
Buckingham and McVie performing in 2017

On April 11, 2017, a 14-date North American tour was announced. Eight of the album's ten tracks were played live, with the rest of the set list consisting of Fleetwood Mac songs and Buckingham solo cuts. Their performance in Woodinville, Washington took place just three days after Fleetwood Mac's joint performance with Earth, Wind & Fire and Journey at Classic West. The Wallflowers opened for the band on select nights. In June, the band appeared on The Tonight Show Starring Jimmy Fallon to perform the album's first single, "In My World".

Some extra North American shows were later added in August, including one in Los Angeles and another in New York City. Another North American leg began in October, which saw the addition of 22 more shows.

== Critical reception ==
Professional ratings
Aggregate scores
Source	Rating
Metacritic	72/100
Review scores
Source	Rating
AllMusic	3.5/5 stars
The Guardian	4/5 stars
Paste	7.4/10 stars
PopMatters	6/10 stars
Rolling Stone	3.5/4 stars

At Metacritic, which assigns a weighted average rating out of 100 to reviews from mainstream publications, the album received a score of 72, based on 20 reviews. Thom Jurek of AllMusic singled out the first three songs as "absolute knockouts". He labelled "Red Sun", "Love Is Here to Stay", and "Carnival Begin" as the other standouts. The Guardian praised Buckingham's guitar work on "Love is Here to Stay" and "Carnival Begin" and said that "McVie’s undimmed gift for melody illuminates every song." Rolling Stone wrote that the album was "another memorable chapter in rock's longest-running soap opera, with both Lindsey and Christine thriving on the dysfunctional vibes."

PopMatters believed that Lindsey Buckingham/Christine McVie should be perceived as a duet album rather than a duets album, adding that McVie was largely inaudible on Buckingham's compositions. Paste thought that the album was not "nearly as caustic or wistful as the band's '70s material", but said that "the songcraft is still there all these years later".

== Commercial performance ==
The album debuted at No. 17 on Billboard 200 with 23,000 equivalent album units, 22,000 of which were in traditional album sales. The chart ranking is higher than either of the two artists' solo projects. UK sales exceeded 19,000 units, which was enough to vault the album to the No. 5 spot. It debuted at No. 3 in the Sales Chart.

== Track listing ==
No.	Title	Writer(s)	Producer(s)	Length
1.	"Sleeping Around the Corner" (lead vocals: Buckingham)	Lindsey Buckingham	Buckingham	3:48
2.	"Feel About You" (lead vocals: C. McVie)	Christine McVie; Buckingham	Buckingham; Mark Needham^{[a]}	3:28
3.	"In My World" (lead vocals: Buckingham)	Buckingham	Buckingham; Mitchell Froom	4:25
4.	"Red Sun" (lead vocals: C. McVie)	C. McVie; Buckingham	Buckingham; Needham^{[a]}	3:15
5.	"Love Is Here to Stay" (lead vocals: Buckingham)	Buckingham	Buckingham	4:25
6.	"Too Far Gone" (lead vocals: C. McVie)	C. McVie; Buckingham	Buckingham; Needham^{[a]}	3:21
7.	"Lay Down for Free" (lead vocals: Buckingham)	Buckingham	Buckingham; Froom	3:56
8.	"Game of Pretend" (lead vocals: C. McVie)	C. McVie	Buckingham; Needham^{[a]}	4:34
9.	"On with the Show" (lead vocals: Buckingham)	Buckingham	Buckingham, Froom	3:47
10.	"Carnival Begin" (lead vocals: C. McVie)	C. McVie	Buckingham; Needham^{[a]}	4:40
Total length:				39:39

- ^a signifies a co-producer

== Personnel ==
- Lindsey Buckingham – vocals, guitars, keyboards, bass, drums, percussion
- Christine McVie – vocals, keyboards

Additional personnel

- Mitchell Froom – keyboards
- John McVie – bass
- Mick Fleetwood – drums, percussion

=== Production ===
- Lindsey Buckingham – recording (1, 3, 5, 7, 9), mixing
- Mark Needham – recording (1, 2, 4, 5, 6, 8, 10), mixing (1, 2, 4–10)
- Ben O'Neill – recording (2, 4, 6, 8, 10)
- David Boucher – recording (3, 7, 9)
- Stephen Marcussen – mastering at Marcussen Mastering (Hollywood, California)
- Jeri Heiden – design
- John Russo – photography
- Irving Azoff, Blain Clausen, Adam Flick, Carl Stubner and Martin Wyatt – management team

== Charts ==
Chart performance for Lindsey Buckingham Christine McVie
Chart (2017)	Peak position
Australian Albums (ARIA)	21
Austrian Albums (Ö3 Austria)	75
Belgian Albums (Ultratop Flanders)	13
Belgian Albums (Ultratop Wallonia)	65
Canadian Albums (Billboard)	35
Dutch Albums (Album Top 100)	14
German Albums (Offizielle Top 100)	27
Irish Albums (IRMA)	9
New Zealand Albums (RMNZ)	22
Norwegian Albums (VG-lista)	31
Scottish Albums (Official Charts)	2
Spanish Albums (PROMUSICAE)	76
Swedish Albums (Sverigetopplistan)	28
Swiss Albums (Schweizer Hitparade)	29
UK Albums (Official Charts)	5
US Billboard 200	17

== Certifications ==
Certifications for Lindsey Buckingham Christine McVie
Region	Certification	Certified units/sales
United Kingdom (BPI)	Silver	60,000^{‡}
^{‡} Sales+streaming figures based on certification alone.
