= Songbird (A Solo Collection) =

Greatest hits album by Christine McVie
- Released: 24 June 2022
- Genres: Pop; pop rock
- Length: 42:51
- Labels: Warner Bros., Rhino Records
- Producer: Glyn Johns

Christine McVie chronology
In the Meantime (2004)	Songbird (A Solo Collection) (2022)

Songbird (A Solo Collection) is a compilation album by English musician, singer, and songwriter Christine McVie, released in 2022. It was McVie's final release before her death later that year in November.

The compilation album includes remixed songs from McVie's 1984 eponymous release and her 2004 album In the Meantime along with previously unreleased music. Producer Glyn Johns was involved with the project and helped McVie select her favorite solo songs to rework with extra instrumentation.

"Slow Down" was originally slated to appear on the soundtrack for American Flyers, but the song was not used for the film. McVie wrote the song as a love song and incorporated aspects of cycling into the lyrics. The collection also includes an orchestral rendition of "Songbird", which features an orchestral score by Vince Mendoza layered underneath the vocals from the original recording found on Fleetwood Mac's Rumours album. "All You Gotta Do" was written during the In the Meantime sessions and was recorded as a duet with George Hawkins, who also appeared on the Christine McVie album. The song was left unfinished at the time, so Glyn Johns paired McVie with Ethan Johns and Ricky Peterson to complete it.

== Track listing ==
Songbird (A Solo Collection) track listing
No.	Title	Writer(s)	Origin	Length
1.	"Friend" (remix)	Christine McVie, Dan Perfect, Robbie Patton, George Hawkins	In the Meantime, 2004	4:29
2.	"Sweet Revenge" (remix)	McVie; Perfect	In the Meantime	3:49
3.	"The Challenge" (remix)	McVie; Todd Sharp	Christine McVie, 1984	4:15
4.	"Northern Star" (remix)	Perfect	In the Meantime	4:27
5.	"Ask Anybody" (remix)	McVie; Steve Winwood	Christine McVie	4:58
6.	"Slow Down"	McVie	New song	3:22
7.	"Easy Come, Easy Go"	McVie; Eddy Quintela	In the Meantime	4:34
8.	"Givin' It Back" (remix)	McVie; Billy Burnette; Hawkins	In the Meantime	4:20
9.	"All You Gotta Do"	McVie; Hawkins	New song	4:54
10.	"Songbird" (orchestral mix)	McVie	Unreleased in this mix; original version found on Rumours, 1977	3:38
Total length:				42:51

== Personnel ==
- Christine McVie – vocals (all tracks), keyboards (tracks 1–9)
- Dan Perfect – guitars (tracks 1–2, 4, 7–9), backing vocals (tracks 7–8)
- George Hawkins – bass guitar (tracks 1–9), backing vocals (tracks 7–8)
- Steve Ferrone – drums (tracks 1–4, 6–8)
- Luis Conte – percussion (tracks 1, 4, 7–8)
- David Isaacs – backing vocals (tracks 1, 4, 7)
- Ethan Johns – drums (tracks 2–3, 5, 9), percussion (tracks 3–5), slide guitar (tracks 3, 5–6), electric guitar (track 4, 9), acoustic guitar (4), tiple (track 8), eight-string ukulele (track 8)
- Lenny Castro – percussion (track 2)
- Todd Sharp – guitars (tracks 3, 5–6), backing vocals (track 3)
- Eric Clapton – guitar (track 3)
- Lindsey Buckingham – backing vocals (track 3)
- Guy Fletcher – Hammond organ (tracks 3–5), synth strings (track 4)
- Steve Winwood – synth piano (track 5), backing vocals (track 5)
- Robbie Patton – backing vocals (track 6)
- Billy Burnette – backing vocals (track 8)
- Ricky Peterson – Hammond organ (track 9)

Production

- Glyn Johns – producer, remixing
- Martin Wyatt – executive producer
- Johnnie Walker – liner notes
- Lisa Glines – art direction
- Rachel Gutek – art direction, design
- Bernie Grundman – lacquer cut
- Geoff Foster – engineer (track 10)
- Vince Mendoza – sting arrangement (track 10)
- John Ashton Thomas – conductor (track 10)

== Charts ==
Chart performance for Songbird (A Solo Collection)
Chart (2022)	Peak position
Scottish Albums (Official Charts)	15
UK Album Downloads (OCC)	36
UK Album Sales (OCC)	24
UK Physical Albums (OCC)	22
