= Roads to You =

Roads to You is the name of a continued series of cultural workshops intended to promote peace and tolerance through music. The program was founded by Jordanian composer and pianist Zade Dirani.

Zade's Roads to You

== Origins ==
In the wake of the tragic attacks of 9/11, Zade was moved to do something positive to promote peace in the wake of such a tragedy. He began a series of house concerts in a "humble grassroots effort to create a better understanding of his culture in the West."

Years and several performances later, Zade became interested in how to continue the positive momentum of the concerts. He turned his focus to how musicians, from all different nations, can work together to be global leaders and ambassadors of peace. This idea was the inception of The Zade Foundation, and ultimately the Roads to You tour.

== Workshops and Educational Partnerships ==
The educational partnerships are an extension of Roads to You beyond the concert hall and into the homes and schools of the communities.

The educational workshops provide insight into the evolution of the various cultures and their development to current day standing, and helps explain the source of conflict in war-torn regions while jointly exploring possibilities of conflict resolution. The hope is to educate and inspire audiences and students by making this cultural and historical information accessible to students, their families and their communities.

== House Concerts ==
Roads to You musicians perform and share their cultural heritage with audiences in house concerts. They are often in collaboration with community leaders and partners.

== Tour ==
Officially launched in May 2006 in partnership with Berklee College of Music, and Seeds of Peace, and sponsored by a host of community organizations including The Barakat Foundation, The Boniuk Center for Religious Tolerance at Rice University, The Center for Interfaith Relations in Louisville, KY, and The Mohammad Ali Center, among others, the Roads to You tour brought the same concept of promoting peace and understanding that the original house concerts did, but at a much larger scale. Roads to You held over 100 workshops in addition to several performances in 2006.

Musicians are chosen to participate in the Roads to You tour based on leadership as well as their musical ability. The original tour featured musicians from over 18 countries.
