= Christine McVie (album) =

Studio album by Christine McVie
- Released: 27 January 1984
- Recorded: 1983
- Studios: Mountain Recording Studio (Montreux, Switzerland); Lower Dean Manor (Gloucestershire, England); Additional recording at Olympic Studios (London, UK)
- Genres: Pop rock; soft rock
- Length: 43:29
- Label: Warner Bros.
- Producer: Russ Titelman

Christine McVie chronology
Christine Perfect (1970)	Christine McVie (1984)	In the Meantime (2004)

Singles from Christine McVie
- 1. "Got a Hold on Me" Released: January 1984; 2. "Love Will Show Us How" Released: May 1984; 3. "I'm the One" Released: July 1984

Christine McVie is the second solo album by the English musician, singer, and songwriter Christine McVie, released on 27 January 1984, by Warner Bros. Records. It was McVie's first solo effort in over a decade, following her 1970 debut album Christine Perfect under her maiden name. The album features guest appearances by Steve Winwood, Eric Clapton, Ray Cooper, and Fleetwood Mac bandmates Lindsey Buckingham and Mick Fleetwood.

The recording process lasted three months and primarily took place in Montreux, Switzerland. McVie collaborated closely with guitarist Todd Sharp to co-write much of the material and recruited Sharp, George Hawkins, and Steve Ferrone to form the album's backing band. The finished record produced two singles that reached the top 40 on the Billboard Hot 100 chart: "Got a Hold on Me" and "Love Will Show Us How", which peaked at numbers 10 and 30, respectively. "Got a Hold on Me" also spent four weeks at number 1 on the Adult Contemporary chart. The album itself spent 23 weeks on the Billboard 200 chart, peaking at number 26, and reached number 58 in the UK.

The release of Christine McVie coincided with the airing of two MTV specials: a documentary on the recording of the album and a December 1983 live concert at the Los Angeles Country Club. Both specials were included in the album's LaserDisc edition, while Christine McVie: The Video Album, a home video release, only featured the concert. To support the album, McVie also embarked on a three-month tour from April to June 1984. Her setlist included various tracks from the album alongside select Fleetwood Mac "favorites". The touring band featured Sharp, Hawkins, and Ferrone, as well as keyboardist Eddy Quintela—McVie's then-boyfriend—and guitarist Stephen Bruton.

== Background ==
Before joining Fleetwood Mac, Christine McVie had released a debut solo album in 1970, titled Christine Perfect. She later expressed a strong dislike for it, believing that she was "very immature emotionally" and did not feel "artistically together" until she joined the band. After the Tusk Tour ended in 1980, several of McVie's bandmates—Lindsey Buckingham, Stevie Nicks, and Mick Fleetwood—began working on solo projects. McVie later explained that she did not feel ready at the time to tackle a solo project as she lacked confidence in her creative material and did not want "that kind of pressure or responsibility". It was only after the conclusion of the promotional tour for Mirage, the band went on hiatus, and McVie started considering recording what she regarded as her first "real" solo album. She felt "shattered" from the tour and expressed a desire to spend more time at home, where she later prepared some material in her music room. She also said in the February 1984 interview that she felt a solo record was "expected" of her.

McVie had started the writing process in late 1982 collaborating with Todd Sharp who was asked for help in co-writing the material and assembling a backing band. Sharp met McVie in 1978 while touring with Bob Welch, a former member of Fleetwood Mac. Welch had opened for Fleetwood Mac at a few stadium shows between 1978 through 1980, giving Sharp the opportunity to familiarise himself with McVie. McVie first worked with Sharp in a musical capacity when she conducted overdubs for a Danny Douma solo record. During this time, McVie had expressed interest in recording some of Sharp's demos, some of which would be re-recorded for her self-titled release.

As reported by Los Angeles Times, McVie planned to record her project in December 1982 at a German recording studio, but the sessions did not occur, rescheduled to begin the following year in Switzerland. In February 1983, McVie announced that she was gathering material for her solo album and planned to release it by Christmas. McVie decided to hire Russ Titelman to produce the record, which she explained by her fondness towards him and trust in "his decision-making process". McVie did not expect the recording sessions to begin until June 1983, as Titelman was busy working on Paul Simon's Hearts and Bones. She had no interest in finding a different producer, so she waited until he was available.

Since Sharp had already been selected as the album's guitarist, McVie focused on assembling the rest of the backing band. At first she recruited bass guitarist George Hawkins who had previously played on Lindsey Buckingham's song "Trouble", and had also worked with Sharp on some of Mick Fleetwood's solo albums, including The Visitor in 1981. They were missing a drummer and, at Titelman's recommendation, ultimately chose Steve Ferrone, who had recently departed from the Average White Band and worked with Titelman on a Paul Simon recording session in New York City. Although Sharp and McVie were initially worried that Ferrone's playing was too "slick" and "upscale" for the project, they changed their minds after running through a few songs with him in his studio. Before selecting Ferrone, the original plan had been to complete the line-up with Tris Imboden, but he was unable to participate due to other commitments.

== Recording ==
The majority of the album was recorded in Montreux at the Mountain Studios, booked by McVie's manager John Courage upon her request. McVie decided to record in Montreux because she "wanted to make it something of an adventure, rather than just schlepping to Van Nuys every night and coming home." The studio was at the time owned by the band Queen and operated by engineer David Richards, who had been highly recommended to McVie by Arif Mardin. Richards was also in charge of audio recording at the town's Jazz Festival. Further work was conducted in various recording studios throughout the UK.

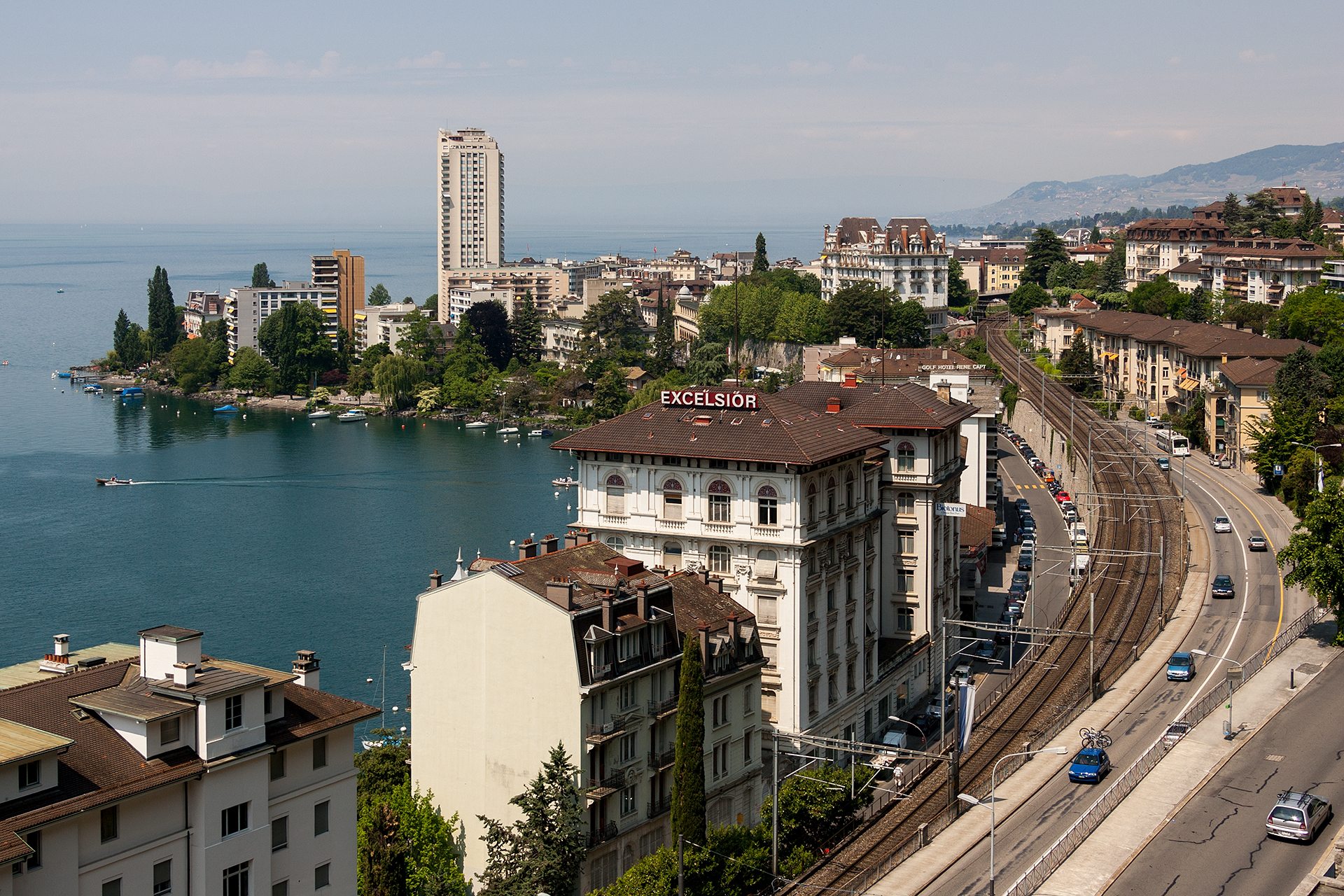
Most of the album was recorded in Montreux, a Swiss town located next to Lake Geneva, at the base of the Alps.

McVie and her collaborators entered Mountain Studios on 26 July 1983, and initially planned to stay there for six weeks to cut basic tracks. However, when the band already completed eight songs in ten days, they decided to stay and finish the album. This efficiency was largely due to the significant amount of preliminary work that McVie and Sharp had done before travelling to Switzerland, which included a one-week rehearsal in McVie's music room and the recording of demo tracks on a Teac four-track machine in the same room. McVie's music room also housed microphones, a drum machine, and various keyboards including an electric piano, grand piano, and a synthesiser. Sharp later commented that they "breezed through the record" as a result of their preparations, and that they completed most of it in around three weeks.

The basic-tracking took place in a large hall that usually housed the Montreux Jazz Festival. The drums were positioned in the center of the partitioned room, which resulted in some "great live drum sounds", according to McVie. Some of the vocal lines were recorded at the facility. At some point during their time in the studio, Sharp's Fender Stratocaster was stolen while the rest of the "expensive microphones" and other valuable gear housed in the facility remained untouched.

Following two weeks of initial recording in Switzerland, the band took a brief break while McVie fleshed out lyrics. Around this time, McVie reached out to Steve Winwood, who agreed to collaborate on a song with her. She and Sharp travelled to his home studio in Gloucester, where they spent ten days working on what would become "Ask Anybody". McVie also invited Mick Fleetwood to come over and play drums on the track. This was the only song on the album not tracked live; Fleetwood overdubbed some tom-toms over a LinnDrum pattern, which he later replaced with full drums. Due to time constraints, the second session with Winwood was arranged later, during which he added keyboard parts to "Ask Anybody", while McVie and Sharp included additional background vocals. Winwood also expressed interest in singing on "One in a Million", and at McVie's suggestion, took the second verse. Although the song was not initially conceived as a duet, McVie felt "it worked out really nicely". Moreover, Winwood contributed Prophet synthesiser fills to "The Smile I Live For".

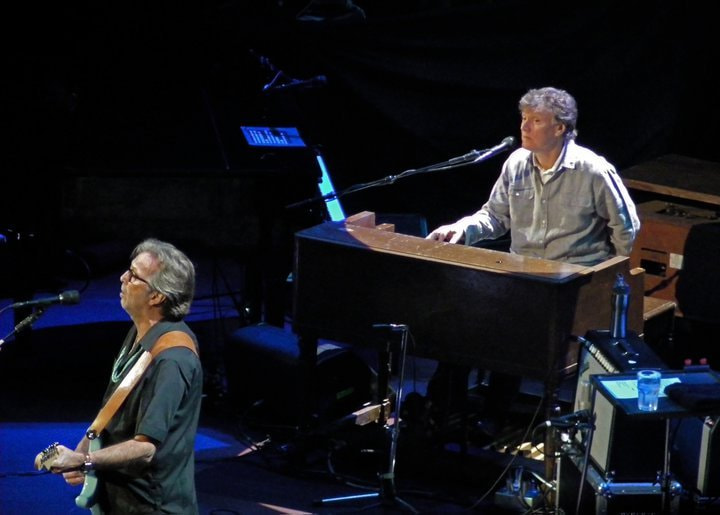
Both Eric Clapton and Steve Winwood made contributions to the album.

After the first session with Winwood, McVie and Sharp travelled to London, where they spent an afternoon at Olympic Studios working with Eric Clapton. Clapton listened to the album and ended up doing the guitar solo on "The Challenge", recorded in about an hour using his Blackie Fender Stratocaster connected to a Tweed Twin amplifier. McVie thought it was "the perfect song for him to play on". It was taped in three takes, and during one of the takes Sharp went to the lounge to give Clapton space to work and saw James Taylor, who had "dropped in for a visit". They spoke for around 45 minutes, but Taylor did not end up contributing to the album. The next day, Ray Cooper, known for his work with Elton John, came into the studio to overdub percussion. McVie missed the session due to a prior commitment and was unable to meet him. As recalled by Sharp, Cooper was "brilliant" and had an "animated" way of playing tambourine, which somewhat distracted him when he watched for potential timing errors with the percussion overdubs.

Lindsey Buckingham and John McVie also visited Montreux while the album was being recorded. John, who was on vacation with his family, did not play on the album as all bass parts had already been completed. Buckingham was in London in search of a producer for his Go Insane album, and accepted McVie's invitation to the studio. Although she invited him for a vacation, McVie wanted him to "hear everything" and Buckingham ended up contributing guitar and vocal parts, including a solo on "The Smile I Live For" and harmonies on "Who's Dreaming This Dream". During the recording sessions, Eddy Quintela, whom Sharp had met at a bar near the studio, contributed additional keyboards to "The Smile I Live For". Sharp introduced Quintela to McVie, and Quintela later became her boyfriend. In an interview with Record magazine, McVie expressed interest in having Christopher Cross contribute to the album; he had previously travelled from Geneva to hear some of McVie's material in Montreux.

The album was finally mixed in New York City by Elliot Scheiner and producer Russ Titelman, a process that took approximately two weeks. Scheiner would later work with Fleetwood Mac to produce their 1997 live album, The Dance.

== Writing and composition ==
It was not until Mirage that McVie began collaborating with other songwriters on her compositions, as most of her previous work had been written alone. She chose to continue this approach for her solo album, believing that it gave her writing a different direction and seemed to "lift" her out of her insecurities. Additionally, McVie felt that an entire record of her own songs might have become "tiresome", and explained that it was more important to her for the content to be "exciting and innovative" than for it to simply be hers. For this reason, she co-wrote half of the album's tracks with guitarist Todd Sharp, who also contributed three additional songs. McVie later remarked that it was "fun co-writing with someone" and that she found the songs "refreshing".

"I felt that I needed an injection of freshness from another writer to make this a good, flowing, easy-to-listen-to album. So I elected to write with a very good friend of mine, Todd Sharp. The combination of the keyboard and guitar writing together was interesting. We're very compatible as writers."

— Christine McVie, on her songwriting approach for the album.

A product of this collaboration was the album's lead single, "Got a Hold on Me", which McVie later revealed was totally fictional, as at the time she wrote it "no one did have a hold on [her]". When they started out, McVie already had a verse going for the song, and the rest was written in pieces, coming together in about half an hour. "Love Will Show Us How", the album's second single, was developed from a demo tape recording of McVie and her ex-husband John McVie playing piano and bass, respectively. She and Sharp spent an entire night working on the music and wrote the lyrics the night after. Sharp also recalled that the song began "very acoustic and soft" and that, when writing, McVie "started it with her verse".

In regard to her collaborations with Winwood, McVie later explained that some of the lyrics for "Ask Anybody" ("He's a devil and an angel / Ooh the combination's driving me wild") had been written three years earlier, inspired by her relationship with Dennis Wilson. She also recalled that the track "really came easily" and came about out of around "six different ideas together and chose the best one". The song lacked a melody, so Winwood "found just the right ambiance, the right vibes, for the words". "One in a Million", in which McVie and Winwood share lead vocals, started out from a "guitar riff and drum groove", and was not conceived as a duet when Sharp and McVie wrote it.

"The Challenge"
Eric Clapton contributed the guitar solo of "The Challenge" to the album. The song's lyrics are, according to McVie, about life, remorse, and rejection.

McVie's other co-writing credit with Sharp, "The Challenge", is "about life and remorse and rejection", according to McVie. She named it after John McVie's boat, and Sharp recalled that when they began working on it, McVie already had several parts "flushed out". She chose Clapton to perform the guitar solo on the track, as he and John had played together in John Mayall & the Bluesbreakers, and she thought it would be "a nice connection".

"Who's Dreaming This Dream" was written by Sharp along with Danny Douma, who previously opened for Fleetwood Mac during the Tusk Tour. Douma came up with the song's title and asked Sharp to get "something started" with it, which led Sharp to write the song's first two lines: "If you thought that I didn't care no more / What am I dreaming for?". Regarding the Buckingham and McVie vocals on the track, Sharp noted that Titelman arranged "who did what and where". For "Keeping Secrets", Sharp collaborated with Alan Pasqua, whom he first met while doing session work. Pasqua explained that, at the time, he "tried to write with as many people as he could" and thought Sharp had an "interesting" voice and a "great pop sensibility". Sharp then presented "Keeping Secrets" to McVie, who liked the song and agreed to record it.

Sharp wrote "I'm the One" on his own and played a demo of it for McVie, who, to his surprise, expressed interest in recording a full version for her solo album. Sharp later said, "she really liked it and was very encouraging to me at that time with my writing". The album's third track, "So Excited", was co-written by Sharp and McVie with Billy Burnette. They worked on the song at McVie's house while recording demos for the album. Burnette was unable to attend the recording session, but thought that the song "came out great". Buckingham, who was later replaced by Burnette in Fleetwood Mac, also contributed guitar to the song.

McVie's only solo composition on the album, "The Smile I Live For", was written in Montreux during the break between the two sessions with Winwood.

== Outtakes ==
Before the album had finished being recorded, Sharp mentioned that he, McVie and other collaborators came together to make a list of the songs they had written. Although they counted "sixteen or seventeen or so", some were "disqualified ... for one reason or the other".

The only official outtake from the recording sessions was "Too Much Is Not Enough", a studio jam created by the entire band during rehearsals. Hawkins recalled that the group wanted to create "something rocky", so Ferrone started playing a beat, and the rest of band "fell in". McVie thought that the song had an "amazing groove" and later explained that, even though it was a "really good and raunchy rock and roll track," she was not satisfied with the vocals. She suggested that the song might have been released as a B-side if she had decided to re-record it. McVie also confirmed that no other unused tracks were recorded, saying: "We didn't over-record like some bands do; we were very compact."

An instrumental version of "Too Much Is Not Enough" was included in the album's MTV documentary. The song was also performed on some of the live shows during her 1984 tour. Jerry Spangler of Deseret News described it as "exciting" and thought that it was a "promising indication that more traditional McVie love songs may soon be forthcoming."

== Album cover ==
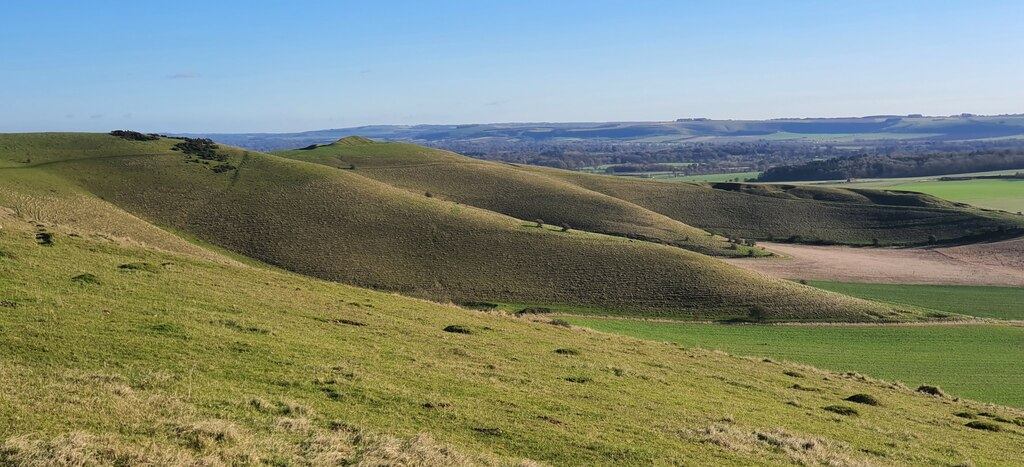
A view of Milk Hill in Wiltshire. The album's cover photo was taken in a similar setting.

Larry Vigon, who had worked with Fleetwood Mac on the cover designs for albums like Rumours and Tusk, was put in charge of the album's art direction and design. He was responsible for choosing the photographer, getting an image that suited "the musical feel of the album", and designing the "look of the package". The original concept for the cover art was a photo of a piano with some of its keys flying off. To develop this idea, Vigon and Jeff Ayeroff, who was Warner Bros. Records' creative director at the time, showed McVie Brian Griffin's photography portfolio. McVie was particularly drawn to one of Griffin's landscape shots, which featured a person in a field, and decided that she wanted the album's cover image to be taken outdoors. The team agreed and Ayeroff suggested that they take "the piano out in the field".

The photograph for the album's cover was taken two hours outside of London, in Wiltshire. During the photo-shoot, the team agreed that the flying piano keys looked "really silly", so they decided to repurpose the idea for the single sleeve of "Got a Hold on Me" instead. McVie remembered that the place looked "gorgeous", but that it "was so cold that the frost was about an inch thick on the trees". The group arrived at six in the morning and, in order to capture the optimal lighting, waited until three in the afternoon to take the photo. Jeanette Leech of Dig! commented that the length of the photo-shoot was a "good metaphor" for the album, as it was "the product of a patient artist waiting for the perfect time".

== Release and promotion ==
Christine McVie was released by Warner Bros. Records in the United States (27 January 1984) and in the United Kingdom (3 February 1984), both available on LP, CD and cassette formats. The album spent 23 weeks on the Billboard 200 chart, peaking at number 26, and also reached numbers 19 and 58 in Sweden and the UK, respectively. Fleetwood Mac's lawyer Mickey Shapiro, who had recently worked on the band's concert project for HBO, helped schedule and coordinate the album's release between the airing of two MTV specials.

The first special was broadcast on 22 January 1984 and consisted of a documentary that offered a "behind-the-scenes look" at the recording of the album. Filmed in Montreux by a British crew, the documentary featured interviews, studio footage and other content from the recording sessions. The second special was aired on January 28 and showcased McVie's "world premiere concert" at the Los Angeles Country Club. The show, taped in December 1983 and directed by Derek Burbidge, marked McVie's first performance as a solo artist since joining Fleetwood Mac. It primarily featured material from the album and included the appearance of Mick Fleetwood and Billy Burnette. Attendance to the event was by invitation only, with a large portion of the tickets given away through a local MTV contest.

Around the time of the album's release, a 7-inch flexi disc containing excerpts of "Love Will Show Us How", "Got a Hold on Me", "So Excited", and "The Smile I Live For" was distributed for promotional use. A few months later, on 5 July 1984, a home video version of the album, titled Christine McVie: The Video Album, was released by Vestron Music Video in VHS, Betamax and CED formats. The hour-long recording included the 1983 Country Club concert performance, along with the music videos for "Got a Hold on Me" and "Love Will Show Us How". In addition, Pioneer Artists released a LaserDisc version of the album, which contained shortened versions of the MTV specials: side one included the documentary, preceded by the video for "Got a Hold on Me", while side two featured the Country Club concert.

McVie also promoted the album with a series of television appearances. She was a guest on Solid Gold and Solid Gold Hits, where she performed "So Excited" and "Love Will Show Us How", respectively. McVie also appeared on American Bandstand, where she was interviewed by Dick Clark and performed "Got a Hold on Me" and "Love Will Show Us How". Additionally, she made an appearance on Entertainment Tonight to discuss the album.

=== Singles ===
Christine McVie was promoted with three singles. The lead single, "Got a Hold on Me", was released in January 1984, peaking at number 10 on the Billboard Hot 100 and spending four weeks at number 1 on the Adult Contemporary chart. The second single, "Love Will Show Us How", followed in May and also charted on the Hot 100, reaching number 30. The album's final single, "I'm the One", was released in July but failed to chart. Billboard described the latter song as a "punchy, percussive tune" that expressed interpersonal dissatisfaction. Additionally, in February 1984, "One in a Million" reached the top 30 on the Mainstream Rock chart.

Music videos were made for the album's first two singles. The one for "Got a Hold on Me" was filmed in London, produced by Jon Roseman and directed by Mike Brady. Larry Vigon, who also worked on the album's cover design, served as the video's creative consultant, responsible for developing its concept and ensuring that "things didn't go astray from the original idea". Since the song did not suggest any visual storytelling, Vigon explained that they decided to make a "performance situation" that connected to the music and vocals by showing "people in the background doing all the background parts".

The video for "Love Will Show Us How" featured Paul Bartel as a "symbolism-crazed director". It was directed by Allan Arkush and produced by Teri Schwartz. Filming took place at the Chaplin Stage in Hollywood and lasted a day and a half. For the video, Sharp was raised approximately 30 feet off the ground on a lift and given an explosive guitar loaded with flashpot, arranged to drop onto McVie's piano. He recalled timing the guitar's throw with the pyrotechnics specialist to avoid getting burned when the charge was set off. Both a medic and a fire marshal were present during filming.

=== Reissues ===
The album was reissued and digitally remastered in 1997 as part of the promotion for Fleetwood Mac's The Dance album and its accompanying North American tour. In 2022, remixes of "The Challenge" and "Ask Anybody" were included on McVie's Songbird (A Solo Collection). On 12 July 2023, for what would have been McVie's 80th birthday, Rhino Entertainment announced their plans to re-release Christine McVie and In the Meantime later that year. On November 3, the remastered version of Christine McVie was released on CD and LP formats, with a cola-bottle clear vinyl edition also being available.

== Tour ==
The Christine McVie band, from the 1984 tour that accompanied the album. Todd Sharp later named as many people as he remembered from the photograph in a 2000 Q&A session.

McVie did not initially intend to tour, but changed her mind when work with Fleetwood Mac continued to be delayed by other members' solo work. For the tour, she assembled a live band that included her three primary collaborators from the album: Todd Sharp on guitar, Steve Ferrone on drums, and George Hawkins on bass. McVie's then-boyfriend, Eddy Quintela, whom she had met while recording the album in Montreux, was also brought in as an additional keyboardist. He was added to give McVie more freedom onstage, allowing her to "get out from behind the boards more and be a front person".

In March 1984, McVie announced that, in addition to Quintela, she would also "go on the road" with Billy Burnette, who co-wrote a song on her album. However, since Burnette had other commitments at the time, Stephen Bruton was chosen to play rhythm guitar on the tour instead. Sharp and Hawkins had previously worked with Bruton in a band called The Lucky Dogs, which they had formed in the early '80s. The additions of Quintela and Bruton helped "fill out the sound", and together with McVie, they completed the band's six-member lineup.

The supporting tour for Christine McVie was scheduled with 34 dates and took place between April and June 1984. It featured Baxter Robinson, a "five-piece Los Angeles-based rock group with a good beat", as the opening act. The setlist opened with "Say You Love Me" and consisted of nearly all the songs from the album, along with some of McVie's Fleetwood Mac "favorites", featuring tracks like "Just Crazy Love" (from Mystery to Me) and "Spare Me a Little of Your Love" (from Bare Trees). Other occasionally performed songs included "Too Much Is Not Enough", an unreleased track from the recording sessions, and "Guitar Bug", written by Sharp and Burnette and described as a "bouncy rocker a la Chuck Berry". Some shows featured a hanging stage prop that consisted of "huge piano keys bent into a slithering snake shape". Ken Tucker of The Philadelphia Inquirer, wrote that the "slinky" keys looked like they "had just slid off a piano and were about to slip off into space", and described them as an "apt metaphor for McVie's sinuous music".

The tour also saw occasional guest appearances. In June, during the show at the Universal Amphitheatre in Los Angeles, Mick Fleetwood made a surprise appearance, though he did not perform. The previous month, McVie and her band performed at the Eisenhower Hall Theatre in West Point, New York, in a special two-hour concert alongside comedian Joe Piscopo, who was then a cast member on Saturday Night Live. Buckingham, who played on the album, also attended one of the shows as an audience member, but expressed disappointment with the performance. He felt that it came close to being a "lounge act" because McVie was "resting so heavily on Fleetwood Mac's laurels".

Reflecting on the tour in June 1984, McVie said that it was "very different" from the ones she did with Fleetwood Mac, remarking that:

It's a lot smaller scale. We're not doing the limousine treatment this time around. This is something I haven't done in a while, playing in small places. This is a bit like the old days, actually. It's quite fun to do. However, it's nothing I'd take on as a career.

By 1987, she ruled out the possibility of doing another solo tour. In an interview with BAM, McVie explained that she did not "enjoy the pressure of being the only one up there who everybody looks to for leadership". She instead stated her preference of prioritising Fleetwood Mac, adding that she was "never too keen on the solo thing".

== Critical reception ==
Professional ratings
Review scores
Source	Rating
AllMusic	4/5 stars
Christgau's Record Guide: The '80s	B+
Knight Ridder	9/10
People	B
Rolling Stone	2/5 stars
Sounds	3/5 stars

On 11 February 1984, Billboard wrote that Christine McVie "inevitably" shared Fleetwood Mac's "current melodic thrust" and that the material and musicians opened up a "persuasive platform" in which McVie "simmered midtempo blues rock", and delivered "several sweetly moody ballads."

The next day, Stephen Holden of The New York Times argued that McVie's debut album as a "solo rock star" fell "somewhat flat", since her charm rested on "her beguilingly enigmatic calm," and identified the "blandness" of the songs as one of the key problems. A week later, Kristine McKenna of Los Angeles Times said that the album was "profoundly pretty" and sounded "exactly" like Fleetwood Mac, partly due to its "glossy production and smooth rhythms". Although she found it "conceptually empty", she highlighted McVie's ability to infuse "mundane, moon/June cliches with a mystical quality." On February 26, Knight-Ridder writer Rick Shefchik gave the album a 9/10, describing the songs as "every bit as catchy" as Fleetwood Mac's work and noting that McVie's "faithful, romantic moods" remained uninterrupted, thanks to Todd Sharp's similar "sturdy" songwriting style.

The next month, on March 15, Rolling Stone's Don Shewey gave the album a two-star rating, stating that a "long, uninterrupted stretch" of McVie singing tended to get "pretty boring", as her voice was "limited in both range and expressiveness." He concluded that the "sameness" of both the material and McVie's vocals drove the record into a "very dull rut." A few days later, People gave the album a B, writing that it had a "loose, good-time feeling" and praising its "snappy" tunes "full of rhythmic rock and roll hooks." However, they noted that the "subtle harmonic skills" that made McVie a "peerless ensemble" artist with Fleetwood Mac did not "necessarily translate into a solo act." At times, they also found her singing "colorless" and her keyboard work "overshadowed by her sidemen."

"A lot of people suspected it [sounded] more like Fleetwood Mac than Fleetwood Mac. I couldn't understand for the life of me why that would be so wrong since I felt that I contributed a lot of the hit songs. Part of Fleetwood Mac's sound was mine."

— Christine McVie, addressing some of the album's criticisms in a 1987 interview with Larry Katz

In May, John Swenson of Creem wrote that the album was less of a departure from Fleetwood Mac than McVie's "first record was from Chicken Shack." He likened McVie's songs to Joni Mitchell's, describing them as "eloquent and personal" accounts of her love life, but without the "unseemly exhibitionism." Swenson concluded by calling Christine McVie the "finest Fleetwood Mac spinoff solo album yet." That month, Keith Tuber of Orange Coast magazine considered that the album was "nice" but "slightly disappointing" since it was neither "exciting," "outstanding," nor "exceptional." He ended his review by stating that it was "basically background music." Meanwhile, Stereo Review's Joel Vance found that while the songs were not "unusual ... in melodies or sentiments", they formed a "series of emotional tone poems." He described the arrangements as "persuasive and inventive" and concluded that McVie had made some "sterling" music.

Robert Christgau gave the album a B+, describing the songs as "unimpeachably sensible and unfailingly pleasant" and saying that, except for "The Smile I Live For", they pace "proudly by in full confidence" and "set you humming." He agreed that the "proceedings" were "somnolent", but attributed this to the fact that "deep satisfactions" of McVie's voice were better appreciated in the company of "brighter and flightier" ones, as well as the absence of Mick Fleetwood and John McVie on drums and bass.

In a retrospective review, AllMusic reviewer Stephen Thomas Erlewine described Christine McVie as a "collection of soft rock/pop and ballads that are pleasantly melodic and ingratiating." However, he believed that the album suffered a "rather predictable fate" as it was a "little too sweet and laid-back to be consumed in one sitting," and suggested that its best songs would have been enhanced by the contrasting styles of Lindsey Buckingham and Stevie Nicks.

== Track listing ==
Side one
No.	Title	Writer(s)	Length
1.	"Love Will Show Us How"	Christine McVie; Todd Sharp	4:13
2.	"The Challenge"	McVie; Sharp	4:39
3.	"So Excited"	McVie; Sharp; Billy Burnette	4:04
4.	"One in a Million" (duet with Steve Winwood)	McVie; Sharp	5:00
5.	"Ask Anybody"	McVie; Steve Winwood	5:26

Side two
No.	Title	Writer(s)	Length
1.	"Got a Hold on Me"	McVie; Sharp	3:52
2.	"Who's Dreaming This Dream"	Sharp; Danny Douma	3:35
3.	"I'm the One"	Sharp	4:03
4.	"Keeping Secrets"	Sharp; Alan Pasqua	3:32
5.	"The Smile I Live For"	McVie	5:05
Total length:			43:29

== Personnel ==
Adapted from the album's liner notes.

The Band

- Christine McVie – lead vocals, backing vocals, keyboards, percussion
- Todd Sharp – guitar, backing vocals
- George Hawkins – bass guitar, backing vocals
- Steve Ferrone – drums, percussion

Additional musicians

- Lindsey Buckingham – backing vocals (2, 7, 10), guitar (3, 6), lead guitar (10)
- Eric Clapton – lead guitar (2)
- Ray Cooper – percussion (2, 3, 5, 10)
- Mick Fleetwood – drums (5)
- Eddy Quintela – additional keyboards (10)
- Steve Winwood – co-lead vocals (4), backing vocals (4, 5), synthesizers (4–6, 10), piano (5)

Production

- Russ Titelman – producer
- David Richards – engineer
- Elliot Scheiner – mixing (at A&R Recording Studios, New York)
- Ted Jensen – mastering (at Sterling Sound, New York)
- John Courage – manager
- Patrick Byrne – equipment manager
- Larry Vigon – art direction, cover design
- Jeffrey Kent Ayeroff – art direction
- Brian Griffin – cover photography
- Sam Emerson – inner sleeve photography
- Cicely Balston – 2023 remastering (at AIR Studios)

Second engineers

- Thomas P. Price Jr.
- Nobby
- Toby Ellington
- Larry Frank

Production coordinators

- Chris Kable
- Mary Melia
- Kimberly Boyle

== Charts ==
Weekly chart performance for Christine McVie
Chart (1984)	Peak position
Australian Albums (Kent Music Report)	67
Canadian Albums (RPM)	39
Dutch Albums Chart	49
Swedish Albums Chart	19
Swiss Albums Chart	25
UK Albums Chart	58
US Billboard 200	26

Chart (2023)	Peak position
Hungarian Physical Albums (MAHASZ)	39
