= Love Will Show Us How =

Single by Christine McVie

from the album Christine McVie
- A-side: "Love Will Show Us How"
- B-side: "The Challenge"
- Released: 20 April 1984
- Recorded: 1983
- Genre: Pop rock
- Length: 4:14
- Label: Warner Bros. Records
- Songwriters: Christine McVie, Todd Sharp

Christine McVie singles chronology
"Got a Hold on Me" (1984)	"Love Will Show Us How" (1984)	"I'm the One" (1984)

"Love Will Show Us How" is a song by Christine McVie, released as the second single from her eponymous second solo album in 1984. The song reached number 30 on the Billboard Hot 100 and number 32 on the Billboard Adult Contemporary chart. A music video was created to accompany the release of the single and received medium rotation on MTV.

== Background ==
The instrumental basis of "Love Will Show Us How" emerged from a demo tape recorded by McVie and her ex-husband John McVie with piano and bass. Todd Sharp, who co-wrote "Love Will Show Us How" with McVie, recalled that it was originally conceived as a soft acoustic song. "That one really birthed itself and I think surprised us both when it became the song that it did." McVie and Sharp spent some time refining the riff and supplemented the song with lyrics the following day. Prior to its release on the album, an excerpt of "Love Will Show Us How" appeared on a promotional 7-inch flexi disc.

== Music video ==
Joe Bergman of Warner Records contacted Teri Schwartz about producing a music video for McVie with a concept of "everything go[ing] wrong". Allan Arkush served as the director of the music video along with Schwartz, who were both part of Robert Abel and Associates and had previously shot the music video for Bette Midler's cover version of "Beast of Burden". "Love Will Show Us How" was the third music video made by Robert Abel and the Associates.

Arkush worked with Schwartz to develop a music video with the intention of appealing to both regular MTV viewers and older fans of pop music. McVie agreed to the concept of creating a "wacky way-out video" for "Love Will Show Us How", which according to Schwartz, demonstrated the "kind of humor she has".

Sharp spent most of the day suspended up 30 feet in the air and pulled off a stunt with an exploding guitar. For the scene, Sharp was instructed to lose control of his short-circuiting guitar and drop the instrument on McVie's piano, causing it to erupt in flames. A medic and fire marshal were on the set during the shooting of the music video. Sharp recounted the events of the filming session in a 2000 Q&A.

"It was not really a fun day for me as I spent most of it on a lift 30 feet in the air. (I'm terrified of heights), had an exploding guitar (I'm terrified of exploding things) and I'm sure at the end of that long day of inhaling fog juice I went home and went to bed.

The music video opens with dialogue from a fictitious director named Paul Le Grande, who was played by Paul Bartel. It begins with Le Grande explaining his premise for the music video's storyboard to McVie, who questions the merits of Le Grande's ideas. As described by Clint Goldman, some "soap opera organ music" plays as Le Grande says "Christine...trust me", which then segues into "Love Will Show Us How".

Various special effects were included in the music video, including 3600 pounds of dry ice that fogged up the entire room. One scene included choreographed moves from people dressed in hearts, dubbed the "Love Dancers". The music video concludes with an alien spaceship that lands on McVie's piano. On 5 July 1984, the music video for "Love Will Show Us How" appeared on Christine McVie: The Video Album, a 60 minute home video that also featured a live Christine McVie concert from a live MTV special.

== Critical reception ==
In March 1984, one month before "Love Will Show Us How" was released as a single, Don Shewey of Rolling Stone called the song "Beatlesque" and identified it as having the potential to become a future single. Cash Box said that the song "is a thoroughly upbeat tune with a stiff tempo and smooth backup harmonies" and that "the one-of-a-kind McVie vocal is like smoke and satin." Billboard described McVie's vocals as "warm", which sounded "right at home" in the song's "punchy rock setting". John Swenson of Creem thought that "Love Will Show Us How" was "harder edged and simpler than a Fleetwood Mac song."

== Personnel ==
- Christine McVie – keyboards, lead vocals
- Todd Sharp – guitars, backing vocals
- George Hawkins – bass, backing vocals
- Steve Ferrone – drums, tambourine

== Charts ==
Chart (1984–1985)	Peak position
US Billboard Hot 100	30
US Billboard Adult Contemporary	32
US Mainstream Rock (Billboard)	24
