= One Night in Jordan: A Concert for Peace =

One Night In Jordan: A Concert For Peace

Live album and concert film by Zade
- Released: March 27, 2010
- Genre: Classical music
- Label: ZD Records
- Producer: Guastavo Sagastume; Danny O'Donovan; Betsey Kamel

One Night In Jordan: A Concert For Peace, is a concert DVD and album by Jordanian pianist and composer Zade Dirani filmed at the Roman Amphitheater in Amman, Jordan. The concert features one hundred musicians from 40 nations, including London’s Royal Philharmonic Orchestra, and the London Voices, all performing in the name of peace at one of the world’s largest remaining Roman Amphitheaters in the world. The album was released on February 9, 2010 by ZD Records and distributed by EMI. The concert DVD was released on March 9, 2010 by ZD Records and distributed by EMI. The concert aired on PBS stations in 2010.

== Message ==
"The concert is a message of peace from our Jordanian family to the world sent from the heart of our ancient land,” explains Zade who adds, “It represents our commitment and yearning for a final reconciliation in the Middle East and is dedicated to His Majesty the late King Hussein of Jordan who worked his entire life to make peace in the Middle East.” The concert was performed under the patronage of Her Royal Highness Princess Haya bint Al Hussein.

== Musicians ==
The concert features some of the world’s finest musicians – including London’s renowned Royal Philharmonic Orchestra, the London Voices Choir, virtuoso violinists Karen Briggs (Soul II Soul, Wynton Marsalis) and Grammy winner Charlie Bisharat (Elton John, The Black Eyed Peas), Ramon Stagnaro on Spanish guitar (Josh Groban, Shakira) and world music woodwind maestro Pedro Eustache (Paul McCartney and Don Henley). Musicians in Zade's band include John Robinson (Drums), Walter Rodriguez (Latin Percussion), Frank Crawford (Keyboards), Michael Thompson (Electric Guitar), John PeÒa (Bass Guitar), Gary Innes (Accordion), Lilit Khojayan (Qanoon), and Nasser Salameh (Middle Eastern percussion).

== Set List ==
Clip of "Zaina"
from Zade's One Night In Jordan

1. "Zaina"
2. "Untold Fairytales"
3. "Lion of Jordan"
4. "Helwa Ya Baladi"
5. "Tango"
6. "Santiago's Dream"
7. "Haya"
8. "Comes to an End"
9. "Amman"
10. "If We Only Have Love"
11. "New Beginnings"
12. "Kingdom of Peace"
