= Songbird (Fleetwood Mac song) =

Song by Fleetwood Mac

from the album Rumours
- A-side: "Dreams"
- Released: February 1977
- Recorded: March 3–4, 1976
- Studio: Zellerbach Auditorium, Berkeley, California
- Genre: Soft rock
- Length: 3:20
- Label: Warner Bros.
- Songwriter: Christine McVie
- Producers: Fleetwood Mac, Ken Caillat, Richard Dashut

Fleetwood Mac singles chronology
"Go Your Own Way" (1977)	"Songbird" (1977)	"Don't Stop" (1977)

"Songbird" is a song by the British-American rock band Fleetwood Mac. The song first appeared on the band's 1977 album Rumours and was released as the B-side of the single "Dreams". It is one of four songs written solely by Christine McVie on the album.

McVie frequently sang the song at the end of Fleetwood Mac concerts. Her former husband, John McVie, recalled that "When Christine played 'Songbird', grown men would weep. I did every night."

In 2022, the song was given an orchestral arrangement by Vince Mendoza on McVie's Songbird (A Solo Collection) compilation album. This version received a Grammy Award for Best Arrangement, Instrumental and Vocals.

== Background ==
McVie wrote "Songbird" in half an hour around midnight, but didn't have anyone around to record it. To ensure she did not forget the chord structure and melody, McVie remained awake the entire night. The next day, McVie played the song for producer Ken Caillat at the Sausalito Record Plant.

Caillat loved the track and suggested she record it alone in a concert style approach. Their first venue of choice, the Berkeley Community Theatre, was unavailable, so the band instead booked the Zellerbach Auditorium for March 3, 1976. To create the appropriate ambience, Caillat ordered a bouquet of flowers to place on McVie's piano. He then requested three spotlights to illuminate the flowers from above. When McVie arrived at the auditorium, the house lights were dimmed so her attention was brought to the illuminated flowers on the piano.

For the recording session, 15 microphones were placed around the auditorium to capture the performance. The recording session went into the next morning due to the difficulty of recording the song live in one take. Lindsey Buckingham strummed an acoustic guitar offstage to keep the tempo.

Disc three of the 2013 deluxe edition of Rumours, titled "More From The Recording Sessions", included an instrumental tenth take of the song, along with its demo. In addition to differences in structure and vocal delivery, the "Songbird" demo also featured an extra verse: "You smile / You make me feel good inside / It's a feeling / That's so hard to hide".

== Personnel ==
- Christine McVie – piano, vocals
- Lindsey Buckingham – acoustic guitar

== Charts ==
=== Weekly charts ===
Weekly chart performance for "Songbird" by Fleetwood Mac
Chart (2022)	Peak position
UK Singles Downloads (Official Charts)	27
US Digital Song Sales (Billboard)	26
US Rock Digital Songs (Billboard)	9

== Certifications ==
Region	Certification	Certified units/sales
United Kingdom (BPI)	Platinum	600,000^{‡}
^{‡} Sales+streaming figures based on certification alone.

== Cover versions ==
=== Eva Cassidy version ===
Eva Cassidy's version was recorded before 1996 and released in 1998 on her posthumous compilation album of the same name Songbird. Despite being released two years after her death from melanoma, the album eventually reached number 1 in the UK in 2001. "Songbird" finally entered the UK Singles chart in September 2009 at number 56, after contestant Shanna Goodhead performed the song on The X Factor.

==== Other versions ====
Willie Nelson covered "Songbird" on his 2006 album Songbird, making it the second album to be named after the song. The album peaked at number 87 on the Billboard 200.

In 2011, Naya Rivera of the American musical comedy drama Glee sang the song on season two's "Rumours" episode. This cover charted at number 68 on the Billboard Hot 100.

Mick Fleetwood collaborated with ukulele player Jake Shimabukuro and released their own rendition of "Songbird" on July 12, 2023, which would have been McVie's 80th birthday. Commenting on the cover, Fleetwood said that they recorded it "around the time when Christine had passed, and we found ourselves doing that song, which was not predetermined. To me that was very poignant." They included a cover of "Songbird" on their 2024 album Blues Experience.

On November 30, 2023, The Corrs covered "Songbird" on the one year anniversary of Christine McVie's death.

Waylon Jennings cover of the song was posthumously released on June 15, 2025, being the title track to the album of the same name. It was Jennings first single since September of 2012.
