= Got a Hold on Me =

Single by Christine McVie

from the album Christine McVie
- B-side: "Who's Dreaming This Dream"
- Released: January 1984
- Length: 3:52
- Label: Warner Bros.
- Songwriters: Christine McVie, Todd Sharp
- Producer: Russ Titelman

Christine McVie singles chronology
"When You Say" (1969)	"Got a Hold on Me" (1984)	"Love Will Show Us How" (1984)

Audio
- "Got a Hold on Me" on YouTube

"Got a Hold on Me" is a song by Christine McVie, released as the lead single from her eponymous second solo album in 1984. Synthesizers on the track were played by Steve Winwood, while the guitars were played by Todd Sharp (the song's co-writer) and McVie's Fleetwood Mac bandmate Lindsey Buckingham. George Hawkins handled some of the song's background vocals.

Sharp recalled that he wrote the song with McVie section by section over the course of 30 minutes and had identified the song's commercial viability upon hearing the first verse. McVie stated that the song's subject matter was fictional, saying that "at the time I wrote it, no one did have a hold on me."

== Release ==
The song reached number 10 on the Billboard Hot 100 chart, and topped the Billboard Adult Contemporary and Rock Top Tracks charts for four and two weeks, respectively. During the week of 20 January 1984, the song was added to 92 album oriented rock (AOR) radio stations in the United States, amounting to over 50% of all AOR stations that reported their airplay to Radio & Records. In the 10 March 1984 edition of Billboard, Paul Grein noted that it was the first time any member of Fleetwood Mac had achieved a number one hit on the Adult Contemporary chart.

In 1985, "Got a Hold on Me" received a most-performed-song citation at BMI's 33rd annual award dinner, which commemorated songs licensed by BMI that received heavy airplay in 1984.

The video for the song was produced by Jon Roseman and directed by Mike Brady. Shot in both black-and-white and color, it is a pseudo-performance video showing Christine McVie in a mansion-like room singing at her piano while a backup band appears in silhouette shadows on the walls around her.

== Critical reception ==
Billboard identified influences of Fleetwood Mac infused within "Got a Hold on Me". Music Week was critical of the "rather ordinary" verses and said that they were "to some extent, merely a build for what follows" in the chorus, where they identified "texture changes" and the entrance of "hard-edged female vocals." Rolling Stone called "Got a Hold on Me" a "pleasant enough" song with hit-potential.

== Personnel ==
- Christine McVie – lead and backing vocals, keyboards, percussion
- Steve Winwood – synthesizers
- Lindsey Buckingham – guitar
- Todd Sharp – guitar, backing vocals
- George Hawkins – bass, backing vocals
- Steve Ferrone – drums, percussion

== Charts ==
=== Weekly charts ===
Chart (1984)	Peak position
Australia (Kent Music Report)	55
Canada Top Singles (RPM)	30
Canada Adult Contemporary (RPM)	1
US Billboard Hot 100	10
US Adult Contemporary (Billboard)	1
US Rock Top Tracks (Billboard)	1
US Cash Box Top 100	11

=== Year-end charts ===
Chart (1984)	Rank
US Billboard Hot 100	91
US Adult Contemporary (Billboard)	9
US Cash Box Top 100	90

== See also ==
- List of number-one adult contemporary singles of 1984 (U.S.)
- List of Billboard Mainstream Rock number-one songs of the 1980s
