= Feel About You =

Single by Lindsey Buckingham and Christine McVie

from the album Lindsey Buckingham Christine McVie
- Released: April 27, 2017
- Length: 3:28
- Label: Atlantic, East West
- Songwriter(s): Lindsey Buckingham, Christine McVie
- Producer(s): Lindsey Buckingham, Mark Needham

Lindsey Buckingham and Christine McVie singles chronology
"In My World" (2017)	"Feel About You" (2017)	"Sleeping Around the Corner" (2017)

"Feel About You" is a song by Lindsey Buckingham and Christine McVie from their 2017 self-titled album. The song was one of the three co-writes on the album along with "Red Sun" and "Too Far Gone" and also features all Rumours era members of Fleetwood Mac with the exception of Stevie Nicks. Prior to the album's release, the song was released as a single on April 27, 2017.

Following its release on Lindsey Buckingham Christine McVie, "Feel About You" was played live on the album's accompanying tour. The duo also performed the song on CBS This Morning that same year.

== Background ==
Work on "Feel About You" began in 2014 over a period of eight weeks at The Village Recorder, the same studio Fleetwood Mac recorded their Tusk album 35 years prior. The composition started off with some musical ideas from McVie; Buckingham later reworked the groove and some of McVie's melodic ideas, which was enough to earn him a co-writing credit. Buckingham commented that the song began as "very much a standard Fleetwood Mac-y kind of thing" and that he reworked the song to make it a "little more modern in a way [Christine McVie] couldn't wrap her head around at first."

The final Pro Tools session for "Feel About You" encompassed 188 audio tracks, which included 44 tracks for drums and percussion, five tracks for bass, 14 tracks for keyboards, 26 tracks for guitars, 81 tracks for vocals, and the remaining tracks for audio buses and master tracks. The drums were a composite of takes played by Mick Fleetwood that were spliced together. Some of the kicks drums were looped and distorted, and a sampled kick drum was also added to create a four on the floor beat. Fleetwood also played some drum fills on a cocktail drum kit. Mark Needham, who mixed the song, used a Waves Soundshifter to tune one of the tom drums to align with the bass guitar, which was treated with compression and EQ.

The bass guitar was recorded directly into the mixing console and was processed by various plug-ins such as a UAD SVT and the UAD B15 amp simulator to accentuate the higher frequencies of the instrument. A Waves SSL Channel plug-in was used on the guitars, which were also processed with an Avid D-verb. Needham experimented with more expensive reverb plug-ins, but ultimately decided that the Avid D-verb was more suitable for "Feel About You". He also wanted the guitars on the song's bridge to have a "bigger effect" and achieved this by applying a SoundToys EchoBoy to the guitar, which was sent to a different track with a UAD EMT 140 plate.

Needham said that he aimed for a "modern vocal sound" on "Feel About You" and set about this by incorporating numerous audio plug-ins and audio buses. The vocal tracks from McVie and Buckingham were doubled and processed with two Waves Audio compressors and two de-essers developed by FabFilter and Universal Audio. Buckingham's vocals were also treated with various levels of EQ to his tracks in addition to the Cello Chamber setting of an Altiverb aux. The backing vocals were hard panned and edited to make them alternate between the right channel and the left channel. Three tracks of the mix used the Sonarworks studio calibration plug-in to accommodate for playback options in three different settings including the Village Recorder and Needham's studios in Los Angeles and Nashville.

== Critical reception ==
In 2014, three years prior to its official release, the Los Angeles Times described the song as "a buoyant number with all the markings of a hit" AllMusic wrote that the song's "Caribbean flavor is offset by a doo wop-esque lyric line behind Christine's breezy vocal." Rolling Stone characterized "Feel About You" as a "bubbly pop-rock song similar to much of McVie's solo work and the material she wrote and sang lead on for Fleetwood Mac in the eighties". Guitar Player was similarly complimentary of the song's chorus, calling it one of the album's highlights.

Mojo felt that the song would have fit in with the material found on Fleetwood Mac's Tango in the Night with its "bouncing marimba and stacked backing vocals". Pitchfork appreciated the song's "crunchy beat and marimba hook", but felt that it failed to live up to the "immortally swoony 'Everywhere'" from Fletwood Mac's Tango in the Night album. Spin was not receptive to the song's backing vocals and instrumentation, likening the "Kidz-Bop-ready xylophone riff and auxiliary-percussion" to a "children's-show house band". Uncut labeled the song as "vintage McVie, its pop nous and loved-up lyric slotting into place with a satisfying inevitability."

== Personnel ==
- Christine McVie – lead and backing vocals, keyboards
- Lindsey Buckingham – guitars, backing vocals
- Mick Fleetwood – drums, percussion
- John McVie – bass guitar
