= Christine Perfect (album) =

Studio album by Christine Perfect
- Released: 12 June 1970
- Recorded: 1969–1970
- Genres: Rock; blues; soft rock
- Label: Blue Horizon
- Producers: Mike Vernon, Christine McVie; Danny Kirwan on "When You Say"

Christine Perfect chronology
Christine Perfect (1970)	Christine McVie (1984)

Singles from Christine Perfect
- 1. "When You Say" Released: October 1969; 2. "I'm Too Far Gone (To Turn Around)" Released: 24 April 1970

Professional ratings
Review scores
Source	Rating
Allmusic	3/5 stars

Christine Perfect is the 1970 debut solo album by English keyboardist and singer Christine Perfect, later known as Christine McVie. The album was released just after Perfect had left British blues band Chicken Shack, but before she joined Fleetwood Mac. Released in 1970, the album was originally meant to be titled I'm on My Way as evidenced on copies of the pre-LP single release "I'm Too Far Gone (To Turn Around)". The album was re-released in 1976 as The Legendary Christine Perfect Album, and in 2008 as Christine Perfect – The Complete Blue Horizon Sessions. Despite its name, the 2008 reissue is missing one song, her cover of "I'd Rather Go Blind", although it does also include several bonus tracks.

== Background ==
Perfect had previously been a member of the band Chicken Shack, having achieved a top 20 UK single singing a cover of the Etta James song "I'd Rather Go Blind". The same day that single was released, McVie left the band in 1968 to spend more time with John McVie, who she had recently married. After receiving a Melody Maker award for UK's best female vocalist in 1969, Perfect played a series of live performances under the Christine Perfect Band for six months. Perfect described the band as a "massive weight" and said that concert promoters were "disappointed" in the group, which had also accumulated debt during their tenure.

Most of the songs on the album were performed by the Christine Perfect band, which included Top Topham and Rick Hayward on guitars; Martin Dunsford on bass, and Chris Harding on drums. Fleetwood Mac's Danny Kirwan and John McVie perform on "When You Say", Perfect's cover of Danny Kirwan's 1969 song from Then Play On. The album also contained Chicken Shack's cover of "I'd Rather Go Blind". Since both Chicken Shack and Perfect were on the same record label, Blue Horizon, the exact same Chicken Shack recording of "I'd Rather Go Blind" was included on her solo album.

The entire album (with the exception of "I'd Rather Go Blind") and the rest of the Christine Perfect sessions while on the Blue Horizon label were made available on the CD compilation Christine Perfect – The Complete Blue Horizon Sessions (2008). This compilation included an album outtake, "Tell Me You Need Me", written by Perfect. The compilation also included three tracks recorded on 24 November 1969 for the BBC Dave Lee Travis Sunday Show: "Hey Baby" (originally recorded with Chicken Shack during the O.K. Ken? sessions), "It's You I Miss" and "Gone Into the Sun". These recordings for the BBC were made while finishing the debut solo album and therefore were aired before the album's release in 1970.

In a 1980 interview with Contemporary Keyboard, Perfect (who by that time had the surname of McVie) expressed embarrassment about the album's existence and felt that some of the songs lacked the artistic maturity she believed came during her time in Fleetwood Mac. "When I made that record, I wasn't really sure about my talent, or about what direction I wanted to go in musically. There were people all around who were trying to make me into this kind of a singer or that kind of a singer. Mike Vernon was a great help in many ways – I'm playing music now partly because of what he did to get me started – but even he was pushing me into becoming sort of a black-style English singer. I didn't really feel artistically together until I joined Fleetwood Mac."

== Track listing ==
Side one
No.	Title	Writer(s)	Length
1.	"Crazy 'Bout You Baby"	Little Walter	3:03
2.	"I'm on My Way"	Deadric Malone	3:10
3.	"Let Me Go (Leave Me Alone)"	Christine Perfect	3:35
4.	"Wait and See"	Perfect	3:14
5.	"Close to Me"	Perfect; Rick Hayward	2:40
6.	"I'd Rather Go Blind"	Ellington Jordan; Bill Foster; Etta James	3:20

Side two
No.	Title	Writer(s)	Length
7.	"When You Say"	Danny Kirwan	3:14
8.	"And That's Saying a Lot"	Chuck Jackson; Walter Godfrey	2:58
9.	"No Road Is the Right Road"	Perfect	2:49
10.	"For You"	Perfect	2:46
11.	"I'm Too Far Gone (To Turn Around)"	Belford Hendricks; Clyde Otis	3:26
12.	"I Want You"	Tony Joe White	2:23

== Personnel ==
- Christine Perfect – vocals, keyboards
- Top Topham, Rick Hayward – guitar
- Martin Dunsford – bass guitar
- Chris Harding – drums
- John Bennett, Derek Wadsworth, Terry Noonan – arrangements
- Danny Kirwan – guitar (7)
- John McVie – bass guitar (7)
- Stan Webb – guitar (6)
- Andy Silvester – bass guitar (5, 6)
- Dave Bidwell – drums (6)

== Chart performance ==
Chart (1976)	Peak position
US Billboard 200	104

== Release ==
- CD Christine Perfect Sony Music Distribution 1995
- CD Christine Perfect Sony Music Distribution 2005
- LP The Legendary Christine Perfect Album [Sire] CBS Records / Sire 2008
- Digi Christine Perfect [UK] Blue Horizon (record label) 2011
