= In the Meantime (Christine McVie album) =

Studio album by Christine McVie
- Released: 7 September 2004 (June 21, 2004 UK/Europe)
- Studios: Swallow's Studio (Kent, UK); Sphere Studios (London, UK); Studio International (Ojai, California, USA)
- Genres: Rock; pop
- Length: 50:30
- Labels: Koch; Sanctuary; Adventure Records
- Producers: Christine McVie; Dan Perfect; Ken Caillat

Christine McVie chronology
Christine McVie (1984)	In the Meantime (2004)	Lindsey Buckingham Christine McVie (2017)

Professional ratings
Review scores
Source	Rating
AllMusic	3/5 stars
Blender	2/5 stars
Entertainment Weekly	C+
People	3/4 stars
USA Today	3/4 stars

In the Meantime is the third and final solo studio album by the British Fleetwood Mac vocalist and keyboardist Christine McVie, released in 2004 on Koch Records and Sanctuary Records Group. It was McVie's first solo recording since 1984, and the first since her departure from Fleetwood Mac. The album was distributed on Koch Records in North America and Sanctuary Records throughout the rest of the world. Adventure Records also coordinated with both record companies to oversee the album's release.

== Background ==
The album was primarily recorded at a converted barn situated at the end of her garden. All of the songs on the album were composed by McVie and/or her nephew Dan Perfect. The collaboration between the two began three years prior to the album's release, although they did not originally intend to make an album together. McVie started with a demo titled "You Are", and asked Perfect to overdub some guitar, which he agreed to. Additional songs followed, which encouraged McVie to further polish them. She reckoned that they fully committed to releasing an album once the decision was made to add drums. Some contributions came from ex-Fleetwood Mac guitarist Billy Burnette; Robbie Patton, who co-wrote Fleetwood Mac's 1982 hit "Hold Me" with McVie; George Hawkins, ex-member of Mick Fleetwood's Zoo in the mid-1980s, and McVie's ex-husband Eddy Quintela.

During the making of In the Meantime, McVie listened to contemporary music such as Garbage's 1995 eponymous release for inspiration. Perfect said that there was "definitely that rawer edge, slightly angrier tone in some of the songs that she really liked." Both "Liar" and "Bad Journey" were written about a failed relationship with another man. McVie stated that with the exception of a couple of songs, all of the album's material documented her relationship with this individual that she met in London who was neither well-known nor associated with music.

In the Meantime reached number 133 on the UK Albums Chart and failed to enter the US Billboard 200. Debuting and peaking at number 32 on the US Independent Albums chart, it had sold around 20,000 copies in the United States up until 2005, according to Nielsen SoundScan. In a 2014 interview in the Los Angeles Times taken after her returning to Fleetwood Mac, McVie stated about the album that "It had some good songs on it, but I went about it all wrong. I did it the wrong way, with the wrong people, I didn’t want to fly, I didn’t want to promote it. I just did it in my garage and nothing happened with it. That caused a certain amount of angst, and then I just stopped.”.

The album was remixed by Dan Perfect and was reissued on November 3, 2023. The reissue contains "Little Darlin'", which had previously only appeared on 2004 Australian promo copies under the title "Come Out And Play". Perfect had worked with McVie prior to her death in November 2022 on a Dolby Atmos mix of In the Meantime.

== Track listing ==
In the Meantime track listing
No.	Title	Writer(s)	Length
1.	"Friend"	Christine McVie; Dan Perfect; George Hawkins; Robbie Patton	4:30
2.	"You Are"	McVie	3:35
3.	"Northern Star"	Perfect	5:22
4.	"Bad Journey"	McVie; Perfect	4:29
5.	"Anything Is Possible"	McVie; Perfect; Hawkins	3:14
6.	"Calumny"	Perfect	4:54
7.	"So Sincere"	McVie; Perfect	3:39
8.	"Easy Come, Easy Go"	McVie; Eddy Quintela	4:32
9.	"Liar"	McVie; Perfect; Hawkins	3:53
10.	"Sweet Revenge"	McVie; Perfect	3:50
11.	"Forgiveness"	McVie; Perfect	3:44
12.	"Givin' It Back"	McVie; Hawkins; Billy Burnette	4:42
13.	"Little Darlin' (Come Out to Play) [2023 Re-Issue Bonus Track]"	McVie, Perfect	3:45

The Australian promo release included exclusive track "Come Out to Play" and the US iTunes version featured an acoustic version of "Friend" as a bonus track.

== Personnel ==
- Christine McVie – vocals, keyboards (1–5, 7–12), synthesizers (2, 4, 5), acoustic piano (6)
- Dan Perfect – guitars, backing vocals (2, 4, 6–9, 12), programming (5, 9)
- George Hawkins – backing vocals (2, 4, 8, 9, 12), bass (3–7, 10, 11, 12)
- Steve Ferrone – drums
- Luis Conte – percussion (1, 3, 4, 8, 11, 12)
- Lenny Castro – percussion (2, 5, 6, 7, 9, 10)
- David Isaacs – backing vocals (7, 8)
- Billy Burnette – backing vocals (12)

== Production ==
- Produced by Christine McVie, Dan Perfect and Ken Caillat.
- Executive Producer – Martin Wyatt
- Engineered by Ben Georgiades, Dan Perfect and Claus Trelby.
- Assistant Engineers – Richard Edgeler and Mike Read
- Mixed by Ben Georgiades, Christine McVie and Dan Perfect.
- Mastered by Howie Weinberg at Masterdisk (New York City, New York, USA).
- Photography – Mike Prior
- Design – Ryan Art
- Sleeve Notes – John Perfect
