= Todd Sharp =

American musician

Todd Sharp (born in Cleveland, Ohio) is an American guitarist, singer, songwriter, son of jazz guitarist Fred Sharp and founder of Todd Sharp Amplifiers. He began touring with Hall & Oates in 1975 as their lead guitarist at the age of 19. He has since worked with Fleetwood Mac and Christine McVie,

As a solo artist, Sharp released two albums, Who Am I on MCA in 1986 and Walking All The Way on Wanna Play Records in 2002, the single "Back To 1" with Stan Lynch in 2020. Other songwriting credits include the top ten hit "Got A Hold On Me”, top forty hit "Love Will Show Us How" with Christine McVie, Juice Newton’s cross over hit “A Little Love”, Jeff Healey's "Leave The Light On", along with releases by Mick Fleetwood, Bob Welch, Rick Braun, Billy Burnette and others.

Sharp launched Todd Sharp Amplifiers in 2016, with the flagship model the JOAT 20RT receiving the Editors' Pick Award from Guitar Player Magazine and The Premier Gear Award for the JOAT Combo.
