= Friend (song) =

Single by Christine McVie

from the album In the Meantime
- Released: 2004
- Recorded: 2003–2004
- Genre: Pop rock
- Length: 4:31
- Label: Warner Bros. Records
- Songwriter(s): Christine McVie, Robbie Patton, George Hawkins, Dan Perfect
- Producer(s): Ken Caillat, Christine McVie, Dan Perfect

Christine McVie singles chronology
"I'm the One" (1984)	"Friend" (2004)	"Slow Down" (2022)

"Friend" is a 2004 song by Fleetwood Mac's keyboardist and vocalist Christine McVie from her album In the Meantime. The song was written by McVie, Robbie Patton, George Hawkins, and McVie's nephew Dan Perfect. The song reached No. 29 on the Billboard Adult Contemporary chart in 2004.

== Personnel ==
- Christine McVie – vocals, keyboards, synthesizer
- Dan Perfect – guitars
- George Hawkins – bass guitar, backing vocals
- Steve Ferrone – drums
- Luis Conte – percussion

== Charts ==
Chart (2004)	Peak position
US Adult Contemporary (Billboard)	29
