= Zade Dirani =

Jordanian American pianist and composer

- Born: 1 February 1980 (age 46); Amman, Jordan
- Genres: Latin; Pop; Classical
- Occupation: Pianist
- Instruments: Piano (YAMAHA)
- Label: Zade Inc.
- Website: www.zade.com

Zade Dirani (Arabic: زيد ديراني, born in 1980), is a Jordanian American pianist and UNICEF Goodwill Ambassador for the Middle East and North Africa, of Damascene descent, whose genre blending songs are inspired by middle eastern music, Lebanese, pop, and classical music. He has performed before thousands around the world including Queen Elizabeth and Nelson Mandela.

He has released eight CDs, which reflect his studies of each culture while attending the National Music Conservatory in Amman and the Berklee College of Music in Boston. Audiences throughout the Middle East, Europe, and the United States have attended his performances. His albums have reached #3 on the US Billboard chart. The CD for Zade's project: One Night in Jordan debuted on Billboard at #2 on the New Age Chart, #5 on the Classical Crossover Chart, and #11 on the Overall Classical Chart. Zade's accompanying DVD also debuted on Billboard's Top DVD/Music Video Charts at #18. Zade has toured extensively throughout the U.S and has performed in Spain, France, England, Bahrain, the United Arab Emirates, Qatar, Lebanon, Morocco, Kuwait, and Egypt.

== Career ==
=== Early years ===
Zade's father is an architect in Amman, and his parents assumed he would join the family firm when he was growing up. From a young age he enjoyed listening to Richard Clayderman's music. His early piano studies were of French songs of Edith Piaf and Charles Aznavour. Zade began playing piano and composing for piano and orchestra at the age of 13. He held his first public concert at the age of 19, at the Amman Citadel's Great Temple ("Temple of Hercules"). With his first song, he related a story of how his mother, who is not a musician, helping him write it. He was accompanied by the National Music Conservatory Symphony Orchestra founded by Queen Noor, at which he had studied.

He moved to the United States in 1988 to study at Santa Clara University and later at the Berklee College of Music, majoring in music composition and business and management. When he began touring the United States, he toured virtually nonstop appearing in grassroots style venues such as guest houses, churches, and synagogues, and peoples' homes. Travelling by Greyhound and Amtrak throughout the country, he played as many as 200 events in one year.

Some of his early self-released recordings are reaching the Billboard charts even now, while currently he splits his time between Los Angeles and Miami Beach. His album Beautiful World, which features classical piano compositions, also includes some Middle Eastern rhythms.

Reviewers have described his mostly pop length music which merges with classical, as 'more accessible' and 'the structures are easy to grasp.'

=== Princess of the Night ===
Princess of the Night was a favourite of Zade's, and his latest release brings him together with Richard Clayderman, in a duet with two pianos. It was composed by French composer and producer Olivier Toussaint. This modern version is full of sensuality and honesty. Zade believes that music requires honesty, regardless of technique. He says, "There is no room for masquerading in music".

=== Un Piano Y Amigos ===
In February 2020, Zade released his 8th album entitled Un Piano y Amigos, produced by Spanish hitmaker David Santisteban, and featuring vocal collaborations with some of Spain's artists including India Martinez, David DeMaria, Ana Mena, Lorena Gomez, Soraya, and Paula Rojo.

=== Performances for public figures ===
Zade was invited by King Abdullah and Queen Rania of Jordan to join them on the official state visit to the United Kingdom where he performed before Queen Elizabeth and the British royal family in London. In May 2005, Zade performed at the Library of Congress in Washington, D.C. in celebration of Jordan's National Day by invitation from the Jordanian Ambassador to the United States.

== Humanitarian Work ==
=== Zade Foundation for International Peace and Understanding ===
To continue cross-cultural understanding through the arts, Zade launched The Zade Foundation for International Peace and Understanding in 2005, aimed at helping young musicians share with the world a deeper understanding of their cultures by offering them a unique opportunity to expand their roles from musicians to proactive peace builders and future community leaders.

=== Roads To You: Celebration of One World ===
In 2006, Zade launched an ambitious project entitled Roads to You, celebration of One World in Washington, DC under the patronage of Queen Noor of Jordan. Titled Roads to You: Celebration of One World, Zade led 40 musicians from 18 countries, in a project that showcased participants from war-torn regions coming together and working in an atmosphere of trust and team spirit. He had the idea of doing this while on a hiking trip in New Hampshire. The Roads to You concert tour featured compositions from Zade's three recordings which include his CD, Beautiful World released May 2006, inspired by his Middle Eastern heritage. Zade's vision of musicians as world leaders who make connections through music and culture was manifested in the tour.

His second CD, Roads to You, was released in June 2004 in the United States featuring Arabic and Latin influences performed by the City of Prague Philharmonic Orchestra and Choir. One of the cuts from the CD, titled Kingdom of Peace, was featured at the 2006 Winter Olympics as the Japanese Female Figure Skating Team competed to this song. That song, and the Roads to You CD is the collective effort of more than one hundred musicians from different parts of the world, and was recorded in Miami, Beirut, Prague, and Los Angeles. Roads to You remained on the Billboard Charts more than 20 weeks. His debut CD, self-titled Zade, was released in April 2003, and featured guest musicians from the Middle East and the United States including Charlie Bisharat on Violin, Chris Chaney on Bass Alanis Morissette, Jane's Addiction, Natalie Merchant, Fairouz, and Julia Boutros. The album remained on the Billboard Charts for 13 weeks.

Zaina by Zade Dirani from One Night in Jordan, a Concert for Peace

=== One Night In Jordan: A Concert for Peace ===
One Night in Jordan was an unprecedented event in which more than 90 elite musicians from over 40 nations were led by Zade at one of the oldest Roman Amphitheaters in the world in Amman, Jordan. The concert included London's Royal Philharmonic Orchestra conducted by Ashley Irwin. A Television Special was broadcast worldwide later in the year. The album was released on 9 February 2010 by ZD Records and distributed by EMI. The concert DVD was released on 9 March 2010 by ZD Records and distributed by EMI. The concert was aired on PBS stations in 2010 and 2011.

=== Work with UNICEF ===
Zade works with both aspiring and world renowned musicians, to promote cultural understanding, and spread a message of peace and co-existence. He was appointed UNICEF Regional Ambassador for the Middle East and North Africa in August 2016, with a focus on advocating for children caught in violence, conflict and poverty.

With UNICEF, he performed at Al Zaatari Refugee camp in Jordan, which later inspired the creation of Musiqati or ''My Music'', the world's first music therapy program designed specifically for children in refugee camps, which he launched at Azraq Refugee Camp. The programme helps Syrian refugee children cope with trauma and loss by making music, while also enhancing their skills to communicate and express themselves, and group cooperation. The program was designed by child protection and music therapy experts in consultation with children and adults living in Syrian refugee camps in Jordan.

The evaluation of the program, which was piloted for a year in Azraq refugee camp at children friendly Makani centres for over 4,000 children, shows that 65 per cent of child participants displayed significant progress in terms of their participation, ability to wait and take turns, decision-making, working with others, and ability to express themselves confidently.

Zade also collaborated with UNICEF on the creation of the song Heartbeat. The song is composed by Zade with production by David Santisteban and lyrics by Jad Rahbani. The song is performed by 10 year-old Ansam, an internally displaced girl in Syria who was born blind. The video was filmed in an area of Syria heavily damaged by the fighting. Children performing as part of the choir are all internally displaced and participate, along with Ansam, in UNICEF psychosocial support programmes. They are shown having fun in the video, as children should. He donated the song as “a message of hope from Syria’s children to the children and people of the world, with a simple request to get their childhood back.”

=== Recollect Beirut ===
At 6.30 p.m. forty days after the Beirut Port explosion Zade joined other prominent artists in Lebanon near Beirut Port, to comfort the bereaved and pay tribute to those who were lost, in the performance of Recollect Beirut;. 250 singers performed from across Lebanon to honor the victims.

== Discography ==
=== Albums ===
Album	Year	Tracks	Length
Un Piano y Amigos	2020	11	40 min 18 sec
Mediterrani	2015	10	36 min 40 sec
One Night In Jordan (Live)	2010	13	1hr 13 min
Beautiful World	2006	10	46 min 21 sec
Roads to You	2004	11	47 min 21 sec
Zade	2003	12	46 min 57 sec

=== Singles and EP's ===
Album	Year	Tracks	Length
Princess of the Nights	2021	1	3 min 43 sec
Tango 75	2021	4	14 min 59 sec
Las Pulseras del Verano	2019	1	3 min 44 sec
A Mother's Prayer	2013	1	4 min 44 sec
The Capitol Sessions	2011	6	21 min 55 sec

=== Compilations ===
Album	Year	Tracks	Length
My Arabic Collection	2020	12	55 min 36 sec
Solo Piano	2020	9	31 min 45 sec
Piano Love Songs	2007	10	39 min 4 sec

== Awards ==
In October 2004, Zade was awarded the American Arab Anti-Discrimination Committee's Distinguished Achievements Award for his work that promotes global understanding through the arts. He has also received The Jordanian Ministry of Education Award for the Arts and The Arab-American Music, Art, and Literature (AMAL) Award.
