= Christine McVie =

English musician (1943–2022)

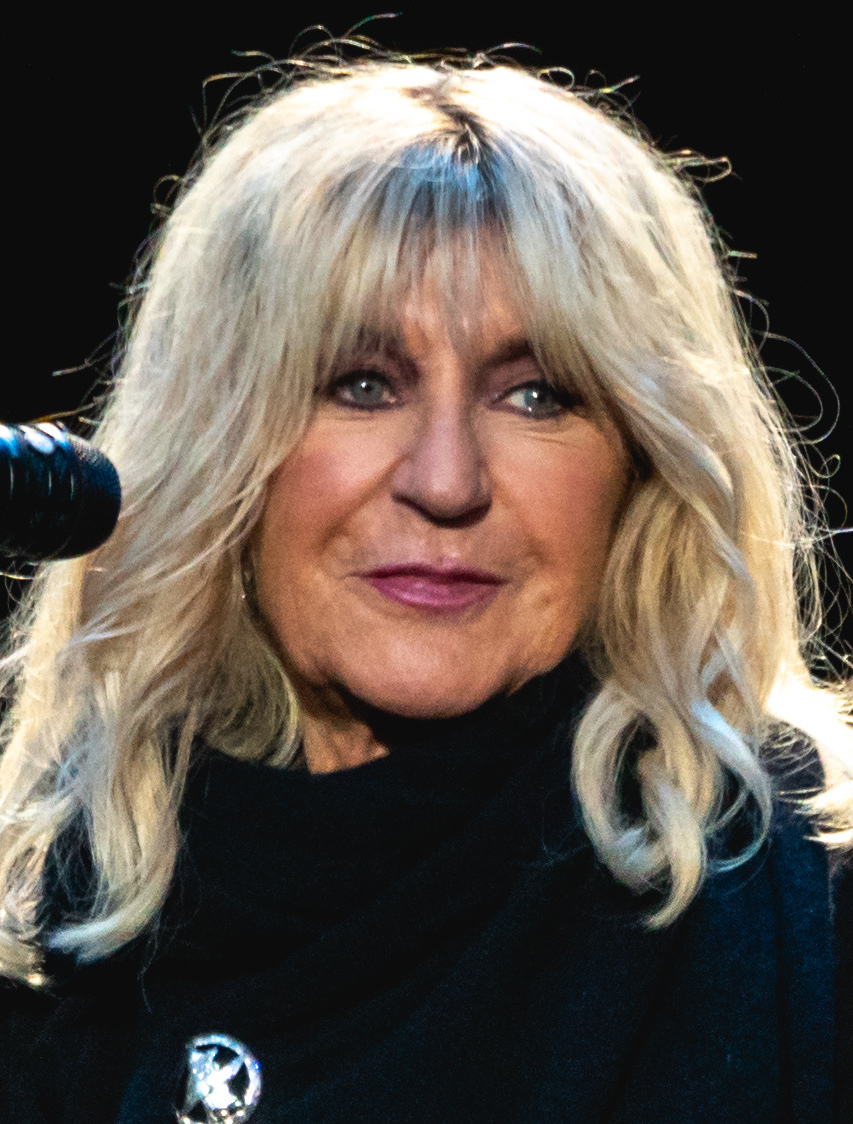
- McVie performing with Fleetwood Mac in Werchter, 2019

Background information
- Born: Christine Anne Perfect; 12 July 1943; Greenodd, Lancashire, England
- Origin: Birmingham, England
- Died: 30 November 2022 (aged 79) Fulham, London, England
- Genres: Blues; blues rock; pop rock; rock; soft rock
- Occupations: Musician; singer; songwriter
- Instruments: Keyboards; vocals
- Years active: 1966–1998; 2003–2004; 2013–2022
- Labels: Blue Horizon; Warner Bros.; Reprise; E1 (US); Sanctuary; Columbia
- Formerly of: Sounds of Blue; Chicken Shack; Fleetwood Mac
- Spouses: John McVie (m. 1968; div. 1976); Eddy Quintela (m. 1986; div. 2003)

Christine Anne McVie (/məkˈviː/; née Perfect; 12 July 1943 – 30 November 2022) was an English musician who was the keyboardist and one of the vocalists and songwriters of the rock band Fleetwood Mac.

McVie was a member of several bands, notably Chicken Shack, in the mid-1960s British blues scene. She initially began working with Fleetwood Mac as a session player in 1968, before officially joining the band two years later. Her first compositions with Fleetwood Mac appeared on their fifth album, Future Games. She remained with the band through many changes of line-up, writing songs and performing lead vocals before partially retiring in 1998.

McVie was described as "the prime mover behind some of Fleetwood Mac's biggest hits" and eight songs she wrote or co-wrote, including "Say You Love Me", "Don't Stop", "Everywhere" and "Little Lies", appeared on Fleetwood Mac's 1988 Greatest Hits album. She appeared as a session musician on the band's last studio album, Say You Will. McVie also released three solo studio albums and recorded a duet album with Lindsey Buckingham. McVie was noted for her soulful contralto voice.

In 1998, McVie was inducted into the Rock and Roll Hall of Fame as a member of Fleetwood Mac and received the Brit Award for Outstanding Contribution to Music. In the same year, after almost 30 years with Fleetwood Mac, she left the band and lived in semi-retirement, releasing a solo album in 2004. She appeared on stage with Fleetwood Mac at the O_{2} Arena in London in September 2013 and rejoined the band in 2014 prior to their On with the Show tour.

McVie received a Gold Badge of Merit Award from BASCA, now The Ivors Academy, in 2006. She received the Ivor Novello Award for Lifetime Achievement from the British Academy of Songwriters, Composers and Authors in 2014 and was honoured with the Trailblazer Award at the UK Americana Awards in 2021. She was also the recipient of two Grammy Awards.

== Early life ==
McVie was born on 12 July 1943 in the village of Greenodd, in the Furness area of Lancashire (now present day Cumbria). She grew up in the Bearwood area of Smethwick near Birmingham. Her father, Cyril Percy Absell Perfect, was a concert violinist and music lecturer at St Peter's College of Education, Saltley, Birmingham, and taught violin at St Philip's Grammar School, Birmingham. Her mother, Beatrice Edith Maud (née Reece), was a medium, psychic, and faith healer. McVie's grandfather was an organist who had performed at Westminster Abbey.

McVie was introduced to the piano when she was four, but did not study music seriously until the age of 11 when she was re-introduced to it by a local musician who was a friend of her brother John. She continued classical training to the age of 15, but shifted her musical focus to rock and roll when her brother acquired a Fats Domino songbook. Other early influences included the Everly Brothers.

== Career ==
=== Early music ===
McVie studied sculpture at Moseley School of Art in Birmingham for five years with the aim of becoming an art teacher. While there she met budding musicians in Britain's blues scene. Her introduction to performing music came when she met Stan Webb and Andy Silvester, who were in a band called Sounds of Blue. Knowing that McVie had musical talent, they invited her to join them as the band's bassist. She also sang with Spencer Davis, who at the time was studying at the same art school as McVie. By the time McVie graduated from art college, Sounds of Blue had split up. She did not have enough money to launch herself into the art world and moved to London where she worked briefly as a department-store window dresser at Dickins & Jones.

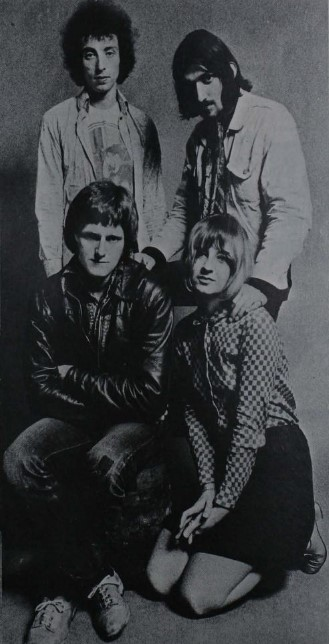
McVie (bottom, right) with her former band Chicken Shack in 1968

=== Chicken Shack ===
In 1967, McVie heard that Silvester and Webb were forming a blues band, to be called Chicken Shack, and were looking for a pianist. She contacted them and was invited to join the band as pianist, keyboard player and backing vocalist. Chicken Shack's debut release was "It's Okay with Me Baby", which was written by and featured McVie. She stayed with the band for two studio albums, and her genuine feel for the blues became evident in her Sonny Thompson-style piano playing and her authentic "bluesy" voice.

Chicken Shack had a hit with a cover of Ellington Jordan's "I'd Rather Go Blind", which featured McVie on lead vocals. McVie received a Melody Maker award for UK's best female vocalist in 1969 and again in 1970. She left Chicken Shack in 1969, having married Fleetwood Mac bassist John McVie a year earlier, feeling that she would not see her husband if they were in different bands.

=== Fleetwood Mac ===
McVie was a fan of Fleetwood Mac and while she was touring with Chicken Shack the two bands would often meet. Both bands were signed to the Blue Horizon label, and McVie played piano as a session musician on Peter Green's songs on Fleetwood Mac's second studio album, Mr. Wonderful. Encouraged to continue her career, she recorded a debut solo studio album, Christine Perfect, which was later reissued as The Legendary Christine Perfect Album. She was invited to join Fleetwood Mac as a keyboard player in 1970 after the departure of founding member Peter Green, having already contributed piano and backing vocals, uncredited, to their next album, Kiln House and provided the artwork for the sleeve. The band had been struggling to manage without Green and had needed another musician to fill in their sound. McVie had been a huge fan of the Peter Green-era Fleetwood Mac and learned the songs for Kiln House during rehearsals.

McVie became an integral member of Fleetwood Mac as keyboard player, songwriter and female lead vocalist. Before she joined there had been talk of the band splitting up, but Fleetwood said later that "Christine became the glue [that held the band together]. She filled out our sound beautifully." The first studio album on which McVie played as a full band member was Future Games in 1971. This was also the first album on which she worked with American guitarist and songwriter Bob Welch, who had replaced founding member Jeremy Spencer.

McVie moved with the rest of Fleetwood Mac to California in 1974, where Welch left after a final album, Heroes are Hard to Find, and Stevie Nicks and Lindsey Buckingham of Buckingham Nicks joined the band. The line-up now contained two female lead vocalists who also wrote songs. McVie bonded instantly with Nicks and the two women found their voices blended perfectly. McVie wrote and sang lead on four tracks on the first studio album of the new line-up, Fleetwood Mac (1975): "Warm Ways", "Over My Head", "Say You Love Me" and "Sugar Daddy", and had a joint songwriting credit with Buckingham for "World Turning". The album produced several hit songs, with McVie's "Over My Head" and "Say You Love Me" both reaching the Billboard top-20 singles chart. "Over My Head" put Fleetwood Mac on American radio and into the national top 20.

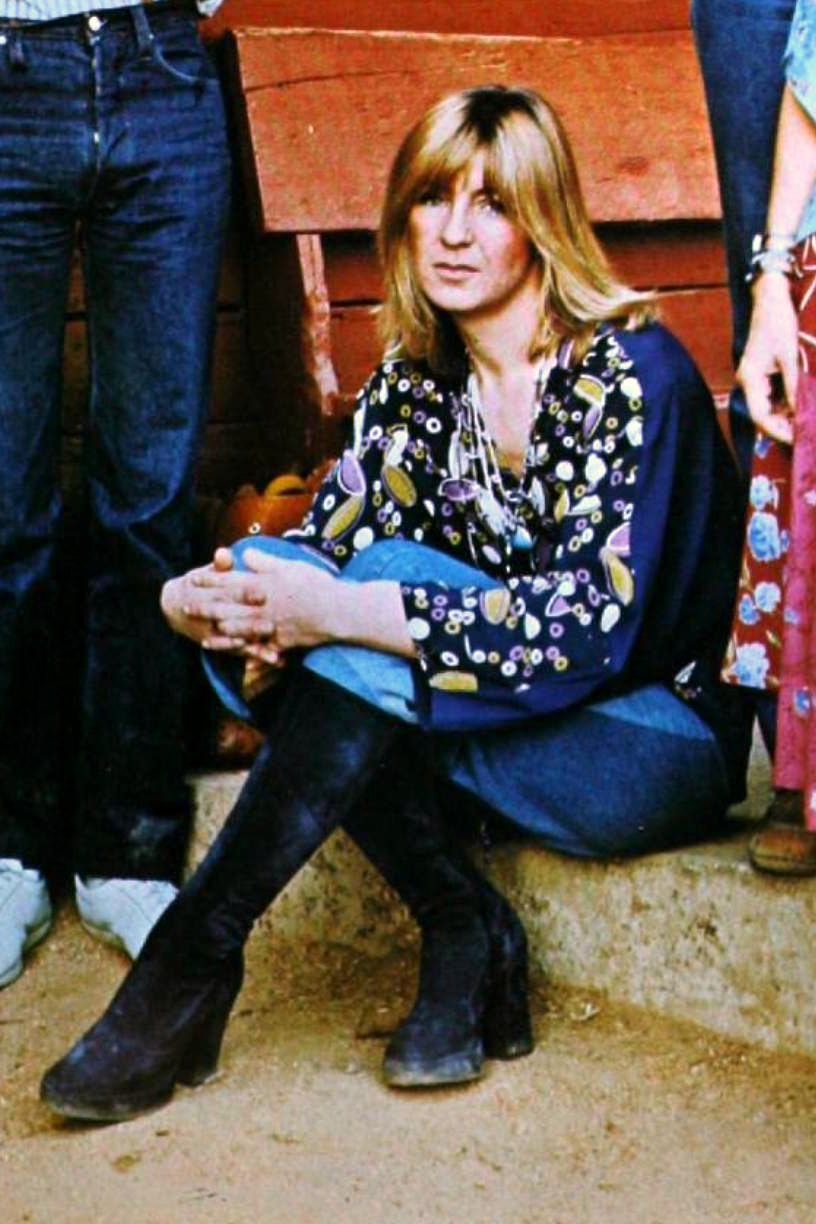
McVie in 1977

In 1976, McVie began an on-the-road affair with the band's lighting director, Curry Grant, which inspired her to write "You Make Loving Fun", a top-10 hit from their next album, Rumours (1977). Her biggest hit from the album was "Don't Stop", which reached the top five. Rumours also included McVie's "Songbird", a slow ballad which featured McVie playing piano and Buckingham accompanying on acoustic guitar.

By the end of the Rumours tour, the McVies were divorced. Christine had a US top-20 hit with "Think About Me" from the 1979 double studio album Tusk, which did not match the success of the Rumours album. After the Tusk tour the band took time apart, reuniting in 1981 to record the studio album Mirage at the Château d'Hérouville's studio in France. Mirage, released in 1982, returned the band to the top of the US charts and contained the top-five hit "Hold Me", co-written by McVie. McVie's inspiration for the song was her tortured relationship with Beach Boys drummer Dennis Wilson. Her song "Love in Store" became the third single from the album in the United States, peaking at number 22 in early 1983.

McVie's second solo studio album, Christine McVie, released in 1984, included the hits "Got a Hold on Me" (number 10 US pop, number one adult contemporary and number one Mainstream Rock Tracks) and "Love Will Show Us How" (number 30 US pop). A third single, "I'm the One", was released but did not chart. McVie said of the album, "Maybe it isn't the most adventurous album in the world, but I wanted to be honest and please my own ears with it."

McVie married keyboardist Eddy Quintela on 18 October 1986 and they co-wrote songs which featured on subsequent Fleetwood Mac albums. She rejoined Fleetwood Mac in 1987 to record the Tango in the Night studio album, which became the band's biggest success since Rumours and reached the top five in the UK and US. McVie's "Little Lies", co-written with Quintela, was the biggest hit from the album. Another McVie single from the album, "Everywhere", reached number four in the UK, the band's third-highest UK chart peak. The single peaked at number 14 in the U.S. In 1990, the band (now without Buckingham) recorded Behind the Mask, which reached Gold status in the US and McVie's song "Save Me" made the US top 40. The album entered the UK album chart at number one and reached Platinum status. McVie's "Skies the Limit", the second US single from the album, was a hit on the adult contemporary chart.

McVie's father, Cyril Perfect, died in 1990 while she was on the Behind the Mask tour and she decided to retire from touring. She remained with the band and wrote and recorded a new track, "Love Shines", for the 1992 box set 25 Years – The Chain, and five songs for the 1995 studio album Time. Nicks had by now departed. In the mid-90s, Fleetwood and John McVie worked with Buckingham on one of his solo projects, and Christine McVie provided vocals and keyboards on some of the tracks. A reunion was proposed, Nicks rejoined the band, and Fleetwood Mac recorded the 1997 live album, The Dance, which reached number one on the US album charts. McVie returned to touring and performed for the group's 1998 induction into the Rock and Roll Hall of Fame, as well as the Grammy Awards show and the Brit Awards in the UK. She decided not to continue with Fleetwood Mac after 1998 and said this was because she had developed a phobia about flying.

==== 1999–2014: Hiatus from Fleetwood Mac and semi-retirement ====
After The Dance, McVie returned to England to be near her family and stayed out of public view until 2000, when she accepted an honorary doctorate in music from the University of Greenwich. Five years after McVie left Fleetwood Mac, she and Quintela were divorced.

In a 2004 interview, McVie admitted to not listening much to pop music anymore and stated instead a preference for Classic FM. She appeared as a session musician on the band's last studio album, Say You Will. In December 2003, she went to see Fleetwood Mac's last UK performance on the Say You Will tour in London but did not join her former bandmates on stage. She released her third solo studio album, In the Meantime, that year.

McVie was awarded the British Academy of Songwriters, Composers and Authors' Gold Badge of Merit at a ceremony held at London's Savoy Hotel in 2006. That same year, Paste named McVie, together with bandmates Lindsey Buckingham and Stevie Nicks, as the 83rd-greatest living songwriter or songwriting team. McVie did not join her former bandmates on the band's last performance in the UK of the Unleashed tour in November 2009. When Fleetwood Mac's 2012 world tour was announced, Stevie Nicks downplayed the likelihood of McVie ever rejoining the group. Nicks said, "She went to England and she has never been back since 1998 [...] as much as we would all like to think that she'll just change her mind one day, I don't think it'll happen [...] We love her, so we had to let her go."

In October 2013, it was announced that McVie was recording a solo studio album for the first time in nine years. The album was never released.

==== 2014–2022: Return to Fleetwood Mac and album with Lindsey Buckingham ====
In 2013, McVie appeared on stage in Maui, Hawaii, performing with the Mick Fleetwood Blues Band, which included Mick Fleetwood and ex-Fleetwood Mac guitarist Rick Vito. This was her first appearance on stage in 15 years. Later in September, Christine McVie joined Fleetwood Mac on stage for the first time in 15 years to play "Don't Stop" at the O_{2} Arena in London. She played on two dates, and her appearance on stage was received with rapturous applause. On 11 January 2014, Mick Fleetwood announced during a concert in Maui that McVie would be rejoining the band, and it was officially announced two days later that she had rejoined.

In August 2016, Mick Fleetwood said that while the band had "a huge amount of recorded music", virtually none of it featured Stevie Nicks. Buckingham and McVie, however, have contributed numerous songs to the new project. Fleetwood told Ultimate Classic Rock, "She [McVie] ... wrote up a storm ... She and Lindsey could probably have a mighty strong duet album if they want. In truth, I hope it will come to more than that. There really are dozens of songs. And they're really good. So we'll see."

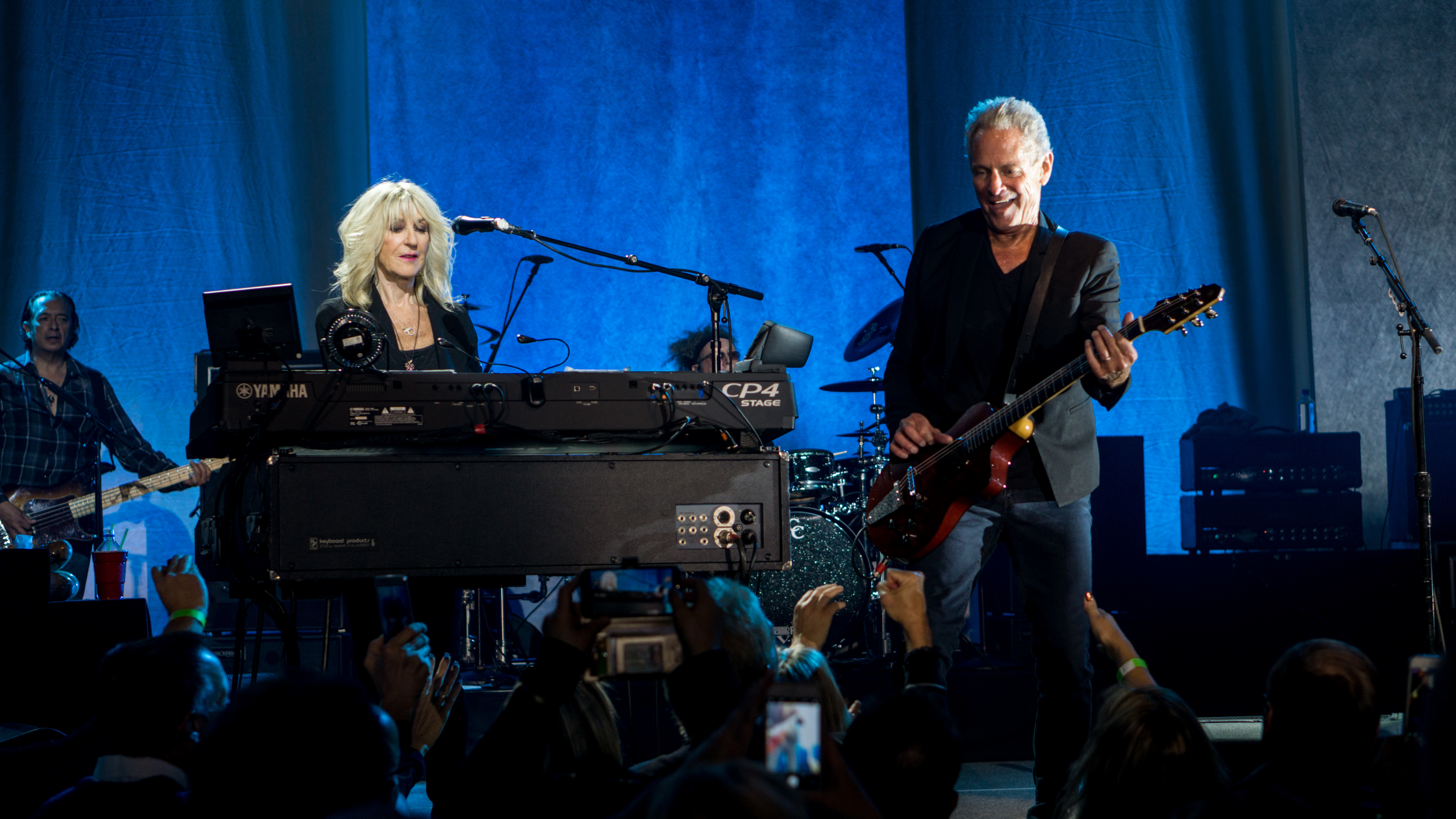
Buckingham and McVie performing live in 2017

The collaborative studio album Lindsey Buckingham Christine McVie was released on 9 June 2017, and was preceded by the single, "In My World". A 38-date tour began on 21 June 2017 and ended on 16 November. Eight of the album's ten tracks were played live, with the rest of the set list consisting of Fleetwood Mac songs and Buckingham solo cuts. The Wallflowers opened for the band on select nights. In June, the band appeared on The Tonight Show Starring Jimmy Fallon to perform the album's first single, "In My World". Some extra North American shows were later added in August, including one in Los Angeles and another in New York City. Another North American leg began in October, which saw the addition of 22 more shows.

Fleetwood Mac headlined the second night of the Classic West concert, on 16 July 2017 at Dodger Stadium in Los Angeles, and the second night of the Classic East concert at New York City's Citi Field on 30 July 2017. On 9 April 2018, Fleetwood Mac announced that Mike Campbell would be joining the band along with Neil Finn to replace lead guitarist Lindsey Buckingham. In 2019, McVie was featured in the 90-minute BBC documentary Fleetwood Mac's Songbird – Christine McVie, directed by Matt O'Casey. In 2022, a compilation album titled Songbird (A Solo Collection) was released.

=== Other collaborations ===
McVie sang with Christopher Cross on the song "Never Stop Believing" on his 1988 studio album Back of My Mind as well as with Bob Welch on his solo version of "Sentimental Lady".

== Personal life ==
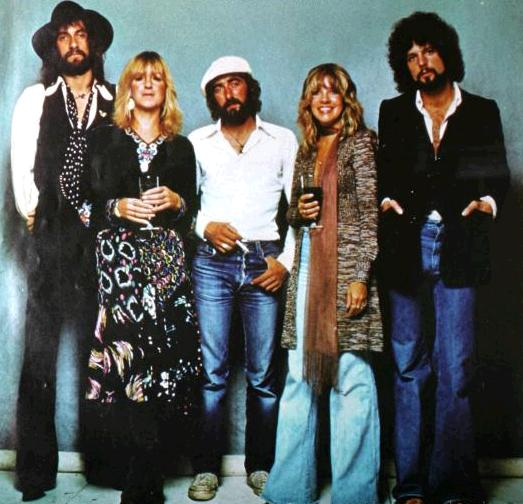
McVie with the other members of Fleetwood Mac in 1977: (from left to right) Mick Fleetwood, Christine McVie, John McVie (Christine's ex-husband), Stevie Nicks, Lindsey Buckingham

McVie never had children, choosing to prioritize her career instead. She married John McVie in 1968, with Peter Green as best man. Instead of a honeymoon, they celebrated at a hotel in Birmingham with Joe Cocker, who happened to be staying there, before going on the road with their own bands. The couple divorced in 1976, but remained friends and maintained a professional partnership. During the production of Rumours, Christine had an affair with Fleetwood Mac's lighting engineer, Curry Grant, which inspired the song "You Make Loving Fun". From 1979 to 1982, she dated Dennis Wilson of the Beach Boys. McVie married Portuguese keyboardist and songwriter Eddy Quintela on 18 October 1986. Quintela and McVie collaborated on a number of songs together, including "Little Lies". They divorced in 2003, and Quintela died in 2020.

During the height of Fleetwood Mac's success in the 1970s, McVie lived in Los Angeles. In 1990, she moved to a Grade II-listed Tudor manor house in Wickhambreaux, near Canterbury in Kent, to which she retired after leaving the band in 1998, and worked on her solo material. For years, McVie found inspiration in the home's country setting, not only writing songs there, but also restoring the house. After rejoining Fleetwood Mac in 2014, she began spending more time in London and put the house on the market in 2015.

== Death ==
McVie died of a stroke at a hospital on 30 November 2022, at the age of 79. She had also been suffering from metastatic cancer of unknown primary origin.

Following her death, Fleetwood Mac issued a statement saying that she was "the best musician anyone could have in their band and the best friend anyone could have in their life". Stevie Nicks said McVie had been her "best friend in the whole world".

== Discography ==
=== Solo albums ===
List of solo albums, with selected chart positions
Title	Year	Peak chart positions				
Title	Year	US	US Ind.	UK	AUS	CAN
Christine Perfect	1970	104	—	—	—	—
Christine McVie	1984	26	—	58	67	39
In the Meantime	2004	—	32	133	—	—
Lindsey Buckingham Christine McVie (with Lindsey Buckingham)	2017	17	—	5	—	—

=== Compilation albums ===
List of compilation albums
Title	Year
Albatross (with Fleetwood Mac)	1977
Songbird (A Solo Collection)	2022

=== Singles ===
List of solo singles, with selected chart positions
Title	Year	Peak chart positions					Album
Title	Year	US Hot 100	US Rock	US AC	AUS	CAN	Album
"When You Say"	1969	—	—	—	—	—	Christine Perfect
"I'm Too Far Gone (To Turn Around)"	1970	—	—	—	—	—	Christine Perfect
"Got a Hold on Me"	1984	10	1	1	55	30	Christine McVie
"Love Will Show Us How"	1984	30	24	32	—	—	Christine McVie
"One in a Million" (with Steve Winwood)	1984	—	27	—	—	—	Christine McVie
"Friend"	2004	—	—	29	—	—	In the Meantime
"Feel About You" (with Lindsey Buckingham)	2017	—	—	—	—	—	Lindsey Buckingham Christine McVie
"Slow Down"	2022	—	—	—	—	—	Songbird

=== Other appearances ===
Title	Year	Context
"Can't Help Falling in Love"	1986	for A Fine Mess soundtrack
"Roll with Me Henry" (with 'Friends')	1989	Remake of Etta James song for Rock, Rhythm & Blues
"Coventry Carol"	1993	for The Stars Come Out for Christmas - Volume V
"All You Gotta Do"	2022	new track for Songbird

=== With Chicken Shack ===
Albums with Chicken Shack, with selected chart positions
Title	Year	Peak chart positions
Title	Year	UK
40 Blue Fingers, Freshly Packed and Ready to Serve	1968	12
O.K. Ken?	1969	9

=== With Fleetwood Mac ===
Albums with Fleetwood Mac, with selected chart positions
Title	Year	Peak chart positions	
Title	Year	US	UK
Future Games	1971	91	—
Bare Trees	1972	70	—
Penguin	1973	49	—
Mystery to Me	1973	67	—
Heroes Are Hard to Find	1974	34	—
Fleetwood Mac	1975	1	23
Rumours	1977	1	1
Tusk	1979	4	1
Live	1980	14	31
Mirage	1982	1	5
Tango in the Night	1987	7	1
Behind the Mask	1990	18	1
Time	1995	—	47
The Dance	1997	1	15

== General and cited references ==
- Unterberger, Richie (2017). Fleetwood Mac: The Complete Illustrated History. Voyageur Press. ISBN 978-1-627-88975-9.
