= National Lampoon's Christmas Vacation 2 =

2003 television film by Nick Marck

- Official DVD cover
- Genre: Comedy
- Written by: Matty Simmons
- Directed by: Nick Marck
- Starring: Randy Quaid; Miriam Flynn; Dana Barron; Jake Thomas; Eric Idle; Fred Willard; Ed Asner
- Music by: Nathan Furst
- Country of origin: United States
- Original language: English

Production
- Executive producer: Matty Simmons
- Producer: Elliot Friedgen
- Cinematography: Rohn Schmidt
- Editor: Joel Goodman
- Running time: 83 minutes
- Production companies: National Lampoon Productions; Elliot Friedgen & Company; Warner Bros. Television

Original release
- Network: NBC
- Release: December 20, 2003

National Lampoon's Christmas Vacation 2 (also known as National Lampoon's Christmas Vacation 2: Cousin Eddie's Island Adventure) is a 2003 American made-for-television comedy film. It is the fifth installment and only film in the National Lampoon's Vacation film series not to star Chevy Chase and Beverly D'Angelo as Clark and Ellen Griswold respectively.

National Lampoon's Christmas Vacation 2 is a spin-off/sequel to the 1989 film National Lampoon's Christmas Vacation. The film was written by Matty Simmons, the producer of the original National Lampoon's Vacation film and featured Randy Quaid, Miriam Flynn and Dana Barron reprising their roles. The film premiered December 20, 2003, on NBC.

== Plot ==
Some time after the events of the previous film, Eddie and his family are no longer living on the bomb test site in Nevada. However, the government has given Eddie a job at the Chicago Atomic Testing Agency measuring his brain waves for radioactivity. With the dirt farm foreclosed on and the RV repossessed, Audrey Griswold has taken in Eddie and his wife Catherine, their dog, Snots, and precocious youngest son, Clark III (called "Third" for short), while the rest of their young children are staying with their grandmother. When a chimpanzee named Roy outperforms Eddie in every cognitive test, the agency, facing budget cuts, fires Eddie right before Christmas. Upon finding out the news, Eddie insults Roy, which results in the chimpanzee biting him.

Although the thought never occurs to Eddie, his boss, Professor Doornitz, is concerned that Eddie will sue the agency. As a preemptive countermeasure, Doornitz offers Eddie and his family an all-expense paid Christmas vacation to an archipelago nation in the South Pacific called Maluka. Eddie, Catherine and Third are joined on the vacation by their cantankerous and perverted uncle Nick, whose wife, Jessica, has left him for a younger man. Audrey also joins them, not wanting to spend Christmas alone after being dumped by her boyfriend, Daniel. Third is not excited for the vacation and is embarrassed by Eddie's inability to hold down a job.

The group is welcomed to Maluka by their guide, one of the employees of the South Pacific Division of the Atomic Testing Agency, Muka Luka Miki. After a Christmas cookout, the group boards a boat to tour the neighboring islands. However, when Eddie is attempting to fish off the boat, he accidentally catches a large shark, which drags the boat far out to sea. In the chaos, Nick crashes the boat into a coral reef off the coast of an isolated island. Shipwrecked on the apparently deserted island, the group immediately decides that they need to find a food source. Everyone is upset that they are shipwrecked on a desolate island and cannot celebrate a true Christmas.

Determined to impress his son and prove that he is a man by providing for his family, Eddie starts a fire and goes hunting with Snots. Eddie chases a baby pig through the jungle, only to be confronted by an aggressive wild boar. Eddie manages to climb a tree, only to fall out of the tree and drive his homemade spear into the boar, accidentally killing it. Eddie brings the boar's carcass back to the campsite and they roast it for Christmas dinner. Catherine and the others are deeply impressed that Eddie killed with his bare hands to provide for his family, and Third tells Eddie that he is proud of him for the first time. On Christmas morning, the group exchanges a variety of homemade presents or regifted items, and they dedicate a grass hut built by Third and Eddie, which Eddie claims will be the first home they have that the bank won't foreclose on. However, as soon as they shut the door on the hut, it collapses.

While looking for help, Eddie signals a sea plane that lands near the island. The pilot, Melbourne Jack, tells them that the island is actually called King Halihalki Island, and he owns a resort ten miles away, so they could have simply walked to safety on the other side of the island. While preparing to fly them back to Maluka, Jack hits his head and suffers a severe concussion. Everyone boards the plane and Jack takes off, but he passes out from his head injury. With Jack incapacitated, Eddie successfully lands the plane in the water with help from the Maluka tower, saving his family. Aunt Jessica arrives in Maluka to reconcile with Nick, having had a change of heart. Professor Doornitz and Roy the chimpanzee arrive on Maluka to inform Eddie that he has heard of his heroics and is giving him his job back. Eddie declines, however, saying that he has gotten a new job. Eddie is revealed to be a pilot on Maluka, with Roy serving as his co-pilot.

== Cast ==
- Randy Quaid as Eddie Johnson, Catherine's husband and the father of Vicki, Dale, Daisy Mabel, Eddie Jr., Junior, Ruby Sue, Rocky, Denny & Clark.
- Miriam Flynn as Catherine Johnson, Eddie's wife and the mother of Vicki, Dale, Daisy Mable, Eddie Jr., Junior, Ruby Sue, Rocky, Denny & Clark.
- Dana Barron as Audrey Griswold, who tags along after dumping her married boyfriend Daniel. Barron is the first of the Griswold children to reprise their former roles, having originated the role of Audrey 20 years earlier in 1983's National Lampoon's Vacation.
- Jake Thomas as Clark "Third" Johnson, Eddie & Catherine's teenage son and Vicki, Dale, Daisy Mable, Eddie Jr., Junior, Ruby Sue, Rocky & Denny's younger brother.
- Fred Willard as Professor Doornitz, Eddie's boss.
- Ed Asner as Nick Johnson, Eddie's paternal uncle who tags along after his wife leaves him.
- Sung Hi Lee as Muka Luka Miki, the family's guide around the island.
- Julian Stone as Melbourne Jack, the seapilot.
- Beverly Garland as Jessica Johnson, Nick's wife and Eddie's paternal aunt.
- Stephen Furst as Hospital Doctor
- Rodger Bumpass as Lab Visitor
- Eric Idle as English Victim, a passenger on the plane. Idle also played the Bike Rider in European Vacation.

=== Voice Cast ===
- Rodger Bumpass:
  - Plumber
  - Air Controller

== Production ==
In June 2003, it was announced Jake Thomas, Fred Willard and Ed Asner had joined the cast. The film is noteworthy for being the only Vacation film to date to feature a returning actor for one of the Griswold children, as Dana Barron had portrayed Audrey Griswold in the original film.

== See also ==
- List of Christmas films
