= National Lampoon's Vacation (film series) =

American film series

- Official film series logo
- Directed by: Harold Ramis (1); Amy Heckerling (2); Jeremiah S. Chechik (3); Stephen Kessler (4); John Francis Daley &; Jonathan Goldstein (5)
- Screenplay by: John Hughes (1–3); Robert Klane (2); Elisa Bell (4); John Francis Daley &; Jonathan Goldstein (5)
- Based on: National Lampoon magazine
- Produced by: Matty Simmons (1–2); John Hughes (3); Tom Jacobson (3); Jerry Weintraub (4); David Dobkin (5); Chris Bender (5)
- Starring: Chevy Chase (1–5); Beverly D'Angelo (1–5); Anthony Michael Hall (1); Dana Barron (1); Imogene Coca (1); John Candy (1); Randy Quaid (1, 3–4); Miriam Flynn (1, 3–4); Jason Lively (2); Dana Hill (2); John Astin (2); Paul Bartel (2); Victor Lanoux (2); Eric Idle (2); Juliette Lewis (3); Johnny Galecki (3); John Randolph (3); Diane Ladd (3); E. G. Marshall (3); Doris Roberts (3); Ethan Embry (4); Marisol Nichols (4); Wallace Shawn (4); Sid Caesar (4); Shae D'lyn (4); Ed Helms (5); Leslie Mann (5); Christina Applegate (5); Skyler Gisondo (5); Steele Stebbins (5); Chris Hemsworth (5)
- Distributed by: Warner Bros. Pictures (5)
- Country: United States
- Language: English
- Budget: Total (5 films): $113 million
- Box office: Total (5 films): $299,743,059

National Lampoon's Vacation film series is a comedy film series initially based on John Hughes' short story "Vacation '58" that was originally published by National Lampoon magazine. The series is distributed by Warner Bros. and consists of five main films, two of which are not sponsored by National Lampoon, and one spin-off. In recent years, the series has been the inspiration for various advertising campaigns featuring some of the original cast members. The series portrays the misadventures of the Griswold family, and in particular family patriarch (and lead character) Clark Griswold – whose well-meaning attempts to provide his family and children with the perfect vacation continually go awry in spectacular fashion, landing them in the middle of various disasters and strangely embarrassing predicaments. In the course of a typical film plot, Clark's initially laid-back demeanor and eternal optimism is gradually tested as the mishaps pile up, as he gradually descends into eventual meltdown by the end of the film – with him often resorting to extreme and farcical measures to achieve his aims.

== Films ==
Film	U.S. release date	Director(s)	Screenwriter(s)	Story by	Producer(s)
Original series
National Lampoon's Vacation	July 29, 1983	Harold Ramis	John Hughes	John Hughes	Matty Simmons
National Lampoon's European Vacation	July 26, 1985	Amy Heckerling	John Hughes & Robert Klane	John Hughes	Matty Simmons
National Lampoon's Christmas Vacation	December 1, 1989	Jeremiah S. Chechik	John Hughes	John Hughes	John Hughes & Tom Jacobson
Vegas Vacation	February 14, 1997	Stephen Kessler	Elisa Bell	Elisa Bell	Jerry Weintraub
Vacation	July 29, 2015	Jonathan Goldstein & John Francis Daley	Jonathan Goldstein & John Francis Daley	Jonathan Goldstein & John Francis Daley	David Dobkin & Chris Bender
Spin-off
National Lampoon's Christmas Vacation 2	December 20, 2003	Nick Marck	Matty Simmons	—N/a	Elliot Friedgen

=== Original series ===
==== National Lampoon's European Vacation (1985) ====
National Lampoon's European Vacation was directed by Amy Heckerling and written by John Hughes and Robert Klane. After becoming the winning family on a game show called "Pig in a Poke", the Griswolds win a two-week trip to Europe. The vacation begins in London, where they visit sights such as Big Ben, Houses of Parliament and Buckingham Palace. Having trouble with driving on the left side of the road, Clark ends up in many accidents and unknowingly knocks down Stonehenge. From there they stop in France, where their camcorder gets stolen; in West Germany, where they spend the night at the home of strangers they mistake for their relatives; and in Italy, where they become involved with a thief's robbery and kidnapping. In addition, they also have many run-ins with a bicycle rider.

This is the first of two Vacation films to not feature the Randy Quaid "Cousin Eddie" character. The second film is the 2015 Vacation.

In the opening "Pig in a Poke" sequence as well as the closing credits, the family's name is spelled as "Griswald" as opposed to "Griswold". Clark's passport during the opening credits also shows his last name as Griswald.

==== National Lampoon's Christmas Vacation (1989) ====
National Lampoon's Christmas Vacation was directed by Jeremiah S. Chechik and written by John Hughes, who also produced the film through Hughes Entertainment. The film follows Clark's attempt at delivering "the most fun-filled old-fashioned family Christmas ever". As Clark's parents, aunt, and uncle, Ellen's parents, and Catherine and Eddie's family begin arriving early, he becomes obsessed with ensuring that everything goes right. Meanwhile, he is also expecting a large Christmas bonus check from Frank Shirley that will cover a surprise backyard swimming pool that he already ordered. However, when the Christmas bonuses are cut, he instead receives a one-year membership to the Jelly of the Month Club, causing him to snap and go berserk.

The film's success resulted in a sequel, National Lampoon's Christmas Vacation 2, centered on Eddie's family.

==== Vegas Vacation (1997) ====
Vegas Vacation was directed by Stephen Kessler and written by Elisa Bell, based on a story by Bell and Bob Ducsay. After receiving a large bonus check from Frank Shirley for the success of one of the preservatives that he worked on, Clark takes his family on vacation to Las Vegas. Immediately hitting the blackjack tables, he begins to blow all his money, resulting in them breaking off in their own directions. While he tries to regain his money through the help of his cousin-in-law Eddie, Ellen becomes infatuated with Wayne Newton as Rusty wins big at the dice tables and Audrey turns to go-go dancing with her cousin Vicki. The film is notable for being the first (and to date, only) installment to receive a PG rating from the MPAA and the first to be made without the involvement of John Hughes or National Lampoon.

==== Vacation (2015) ====
Vacation is a 2015 theatrical installment of the series written and directed by John Francis Daley and Jonathan Goldstein. Following in Clark's footsteps, a grown-up Rusty Griswold (Ed Helms) surprises his wife, Debbie (Christina Applegate), and their two sons James (Skyler Gisondo) and Kevin (Steele Stebbins) with a cross-country road trip back to Walley World, in an effort to recreate the family vacations he had with his parents and sister (Leslie Mann). It is the first entry since the original to receive an R rating.

=== Spin-off ===
==== National Lampoon's Christmas Vacation 2 (2003) ====
National Lampoon's Christmas Vacation 2 is a made-for-TV spin-off film directed by Nick Marck and written by Matty Simmons. After a workplace accident involving a chimpanzee, Eddie Johnson is given a free vacation for him and his family to an island in the South Pacific by his boss Professor Doornitz to avoid a potential lawsuit from Eddie. But when he tries to catch a shark during a family boat trip, they become lost and eventually shipwrecked on an isolated island.

It can be considered a sequel to National Lampoon's Christmas Vacation, although it is more of a spin-off than a direct chapter in the Vacation series, because Chevy Chase and Beverly D'Angelo do not appear. It stars Randy Quaid and Miriam Flynn, reprising their roles as Cousin Eddie and Catherine, with Dana Barron returning as Audrey Griswold. Ed Asner appears as Eddie's uncle Nick.

== Short film ==
=== Hotel Hell Vacation (2010) ===
Hotel Hell Vacation is a short film directed by Bryan Buckley. On their way to visit Rusty and his family at a vacation rental, Clark and Ellen decide to have a romantic getaway at a hotel before they get there. Everything goes wrong and they hastily make their way to Rusty's rental.

The film was a campaign ad for HomeAway that originally aired in part during the broadcast of Super Bowl XLIV and in entirety on Homeaway.com. While it was sanctioned by Warner Bros., it was not sponsored by the National Lampoon label.

== Cast and crew ==
=== Principal cast ===
Key
- A ^{Y} indicates the actor portrayed the role of a younger version of the character.
- A ^{V} indicates the actor or actress lent only his or her voice for his or her film character.
- A dark gray cell indicates the character was not in the film.

Characters	Original series					Short film	Television
Characters	Original series					Short film	Spin-off film
Characters	National Lampoon's Vacation	National Lampoon's European Vacation	National Lampoon's Christmas Vacation	Vegas Vacation	Vacation	Hotel Hell Vacation	National Lampoon's Christmas Vacation 2
Characters	1983	1985	1989	1997	2015	2010	2003
The Griswolds
Clark Wilhelm Griswold Jr.	Chevy Chase	Chevy Chase	Chevy Chase	Chevy Chase	Chevy Chase	Chevy Chase	
Ellen Smith-Griswold	Beverly D'Angelo	Beverly D'Angelo	Beverly D'Angelo	Beverly D'Angelo	Beverly D'Angelo	Beverly D'Angelo	
Russell "Rusty" Griswold	Anthony Michael Hall	Jason Lively	Johnny Galecki	Ethan Embry	Ed Helms (Note: Anthony Michael Hall, Jason Lively, Johnny Galecki, and Ethan Embry appear in archival photos from the previous Vacation films.)	Travis Greer	
Audrey Griswold-Crandall	Dana Barron	Dana Hill	Juliette Lewis	Marisol Nichols	Leslie Mann (Note: Dana Barron, Dana Hill, Juliette Lewis, and Marisol Nichols appear in archival photos from the previous Vacation films.)		Dana Barron
Debbie Fletcher-Griswold					Christina Applegate Emily Kincaid^{Y}	Alina Phelan	
James Griswold					Skyler Gisondo Cameron McIntyre^{Y}	Hunter Buch	
Kevin Griswold					Steele Stebbins	Ellodee Carpenter	
Stone Crandall					Chris Hemsworth		
The Family
Edward "Eddie" Johnson	Randy Quaid		Randy Quaid	Randy Quaid			Randy Quaid
Catherine Johnson	Miriam Flynn		Miriam Flynn	Miriam Flynn			Miriam Flynn
Vicki Johnson	Jane Krakowski			Shae D'lyn			
Dale Johnson	John P. Navin Jr.						
Daisy Mabel Johnson	Violet Ramis						
Aunt Edna	Imogene Coca						
Clark Griswold Sr.			John Randolph				
Nora Griswold			Diane Ladd				
Art Smith			E. G. Marshall				
Frances Smith			Doris Roberts				
Ruby Sue Johnson			Ellen Hamilton Latzen	Juliette Brewer			
Rocky Johnson			Cody Burger				
Uncle Lewis			William Hickey				
Aunt Bethany			Mae Questel				
Denny Johnson				Zach Moyes			
Clark "Third" Johnson							Jake Thomas
Uncle Nick Johnson							Ed Asner
Aunt Jessica Johnson							Beverly Garland
Other characters
Ferrari Girl	Christie Brinkley			Christie Brinkley			
Russ Laskey	John Candy						
Frank Shirley			Brian Doyle-Murray				
Doug						Glenn Rockowitz^{V}	
Motivational Speaker						James Hyde	

=== Additional crew ===
Occupation	Original series					Short film	Television spin-off film
Occupation	National Lampoon's Vacation	National Lampoon's European Vacation	National Lampoon's Christmas Vacation	Vegas Vacation	Vacation	Hotel Hell Vacation	National Lampoon's Christmas Vacation 2
Director(s)	Harold Ramis	Amy Heckerling	Jeremiah Chechik	Stephen Kessler	John Francis Daley; Jonathan Goldstein	Bryan Buckley	Nick Marck
Writer(s)	John Hughes	John Hughes; Robert Klane	John Hughes	Elisa Bell	John Francis Daley; Jonathan Goldstein	Publicis in the West	Matty Simmons
Producer(s)	Matty Simmons	Matty Simmons	John Hughes; Tom Jacobson	Jerry Weintraub	David Dobkin; Chris Bender	Cindy Becker; Kevin Byrne; Mino Jarjoura	Elliot Friedgen
Composer(s)	Ralph Burns	Charles Fox	Angelo Badalamenti	Joel McNeely	Mark Mothersbaugh	Stephen Altman	Nathan Furst
Cinematographer	Victor J. Kemper	Robert Paynter	Thomas E. Ackerman	William A. Fraker	Barry Peterson	John Lindley	Rohn Schmidt
Editor(s)	Pembroke J. Herring	Pembroke J. Herring	Jerry Greenberg; Michael A. Stevenson	Seth Flaum	Jamie Gross	Kelly Vander Linda	Joel Goodman
Production Companies	N/A	N/A	John Hughes Entertainment	Jerry Weintraub Productions	New Line Cinema; BenderSpink; Big Kid Pictures	Hungry Man Productions	National Lampoon Productions; Elliot Friedgen & Company
Distribution	Warner Bros. Pictures	Warner Bros. Pictures	Warner Bros. Pictures	Warner Bros. Pictures	Warner Bros. Pictures	HomeAway, Inc.	Warner Bros. Television

== Production ==
=== Development ===
After the success of National Lampoon's Animal House in 1978, it was decided that another story from the National Lampoon magazine should be adapted into a film. One of such stories chosen for development was John Hughes' "Vacation '58" that was originally published in the September 1979 issue of National Lampoon. Hughes wrote the screenplay for the first Vacation film as "a fairly straight adaptation of the short story", with the exception of the ending that was rewritten and reshot after being "thoroughly despised by preview audiences". In addition to Hughes, Vacation involved the crew of many people connected to National Lampoon. The film was produced by Lampoon co-founder and Animal House producer, Matty Simmons, and directed by Lampoon alumnus and Animal House co-writer Harold Ramis.

Released on July 29, 1983, National Lampoon's Vacation proved to be a financial and critical success. Simmons went on to produce two sequels, with scripts by Hughes. While involved with the early stages of a third sequel, Vegas Vacation, Simmons resigned from production due to creative differences. As a result, the film was made without the "National Lampoon" title.

During an interview on the TBS series Dinner and a Movie, Beverly D'Angelo revealed that due to the success of Animal House, the original Vacation was envisioned as a raunchier R-rated comedy targeting young adults. This was principally the reason for nudity such as D'Angelo's shower scene, and Chase's profanity-laced tirades and pool scene with Christie Brinkley. However, the movie's success with larger family audiences who identified with Chase's everyman-father character caught the filmmakers by surprise. As a result, the subsequent sequels prior to the 2015 R-rated revival were toned down and family friendly, with PG-13 or PG ratings.

=== Casting ===
Along with John Belushi, who starred in Animal House, Chevy Chase had previously performed in The National Lampoon Radio Hour and in the stage show National Lampoon Lemmings, both of which were spin-offs from National Lampoon magazine.

In each of the main films of the series, the Griswold children are portrayed by different actors. This is usually attributed to the fact that after Anthony Michael Hall declined to reprise his role in European Vacation in order to star in Weird Science, director Amy Heckerling requested both children be recast. Chase has indicated that it was his idea to continue recasting the children by explaining: "I always wanted to make the joke, 'Geez, I hardly ever get the chance to see the kids anymore. I hardly know who they are. We should go on a vacation'. That was funny to me: the idea that Clark was such a great family man, but still didn't even recognize his own children".

=== Unproduced scripts ===
Shortly after making European Vacation, Chase and Eric Idle began to write a script for a follow-up called National Lampoon's Australian Vacation. According to Idle: "We spent some time working together on it. It had some nice shark gags, but I can't pretend it was in any way finished". The concept of Australian Vacation resurfaced in the 90s as a potential fifth installment of the series, but nothing ever came of it.

Prior to the confirmed plans of New Line Cinema rebooting the series, Chase made note that he has developed another sequel tentatively titled Swiss Family Griswold. In 2011, Chase revealed that he and Beverly D'Angelo have been working on the idea: "There's a cruise, there's a fire on the ship, we think the whole ship's on fire and we jump – it's just a little fire – and we end up on an island where we meet Randy somewhere who's been left there from an old Survivor series".

In January 2023, Beverly D'Angelo revealed that in the 2010s, actor Michael Rosenbaum had developed a sequel film which involved Clark and Ellen divorcing. They would then be forced to drive to Audrey's wedding in Arizona together and slowly rekindle their relationship. The film was scrapped in favour of the 2015 reboot, due to market research believing a film with older actors wouldn't be successful.

In December 2019, a television spin-off series entitled The Griswolds entered development. The series is set to be aired on HBO Max, though it has not been officially picked up, with former Rusty actor Johnny Galecki serving as executive producer. As of 2023, no recent update has been given on the project. As of March 2023, there has not been updates on the series development.

In June 2023, Dana Barron expressed interest in a new film which focused on Clark and Ellen taking their grandkids on another crazy vacation, while Audrey and Rusty went on their own adult vacation.

=== Remake turned sequel ===
New Line Cinema (owned by Warner Bros., which released the previous films) confirmed a new Vacation film in 2010. The film, titled simply Vacation, was ultimately released on July 29, 2015, exactly 32 years after the original film was released into theaters. It was produced by David Dobkin and written by John Francis Daley and Jonathan Goldstein.

The film is a direct sequel to the previous films (picking up years after the events of Vegas Vacation), starring Ed Helms as Rusty Griswold, as he takes his own family to Walley World. Leslie Mann appeared as Audrey Griswold. Original series stars D'Angelo and Chase appeared in cameo roles. The film also starred Chris Hemsworth, Charlie Day and Christina Applegate.

== Reception ==
=== Box office performance ===
When released in 1983, National Lampoon's Vacation was a significant box-office hit. The film earned over $61 million in the United States with an estimated budget of $15 million.

Without being adjusted for inflation, the profit earned by the individual Vacation films follow behind National Lampoon's Animal House as the highest-grossing films of the National Lampoon brand.

Film	Release date	Box office revenue			Budget	Reference
Film	Release date	Domestic	Other territories	Worldwide	Budget	Reference
National Lampoon's Vacation	July 29, 1983	$61,399,552		$61,399,552	$15,000,000	
National Lampoon's European Vacation	July 26, 1985	$49,364,621		$49,364,621	$15,000,000	
National Lampoon's Christmas Vacation	December 1, 1989	$71,319,526		$71,319,526	$27,000,000	
Vegas Vacation	February 14, 1997	$36,400,360		$36,400,360	$25,000,000	
Vacation	July 29, 2015	$58,884,188	$45,200,000	$104,084,188	$31,000,000	
Total		$277,368,247	$45,200,000	$322,568,247	$113 million	

=== Critical and public response ===
Film	Rotten Tomatoes	Metacritic	CinemaScore
National Lampoon's Vacation	94% (51 reviews)	55 (13 reviews)	C+
National Lampoon's European Vacation	37% (30 reviews)	46 (10 reviews)	
National Lampoon's Christmas Vacation	72% (57 reviews)	49 (18 reviews)	B+
Vegas Vacation	15% (33 reviews)	20 (10 reviews)	B
Vacation	27% (175 reviews)	34 (33 reviews)	B

=== Legacy ===
In 2000, readers of Total Film magazine voted National Lampoon's Vacation as the 46th greatest comedy film of all time. The film was also nominated for AFI's 100 Years...100 Laughs list in 2000. Christmas Vacation has additionally become a television staple, especially during the holiday season, as it has often been labeled as a contemporary Christmas classic.

== Other media ==
Release timeline
1983	National Lampoon's Vacation
1984
1985	National Lampoon's European Vacation
1986–1988
1989	National Lampoon's Christmas Vacation
1990–1996
1997	Vegas Vacation
1998–2002
2003	National Lampoon's Christmas Vacation 2
2004–2006
2007	Family Guy: "Blue Harvest" & "Boys Do Cry" (cameo)
2008	DirecTV commercial feat. Christie Brinkley
2009
2010	Hotel Hell Vacation
2011
2012	Old Navy ad campaign feat. the Griswold family
2013–2014
2015	Infiniti QX60 TV spot feat. Christie Brinkley & Ethan Embry
2015	Vacation
2016–2018
2019	The Goldbergs: "Vacation" (cameo)
2020	Ford Mustang Mach-E TV commercial feat. Clark and Ellen

=== Old Navy ad campaign (2012) ===
In November and December 2012, series regulars Chevy Chase and Beverly D'Angelo were featured in a set of four commercials for Old Navy. Joining them in one commercial were Juliette Lewis (from Christmas Vacation), Dana Barron and Anthony Michael Hall (from Vacation), and Jason Lively (from European Vacation); that spot featured three Rustys and three Audreys (including a "new Rusty" and a "new Audrey", both of whom were children).

=== Ford Mustang ad campaign (2020) ===
In 2020, Chevy Chase and Beverly D'Angelo reprised their roles as Clark and Ellen in a Ford commercial for the Ford Mustang Mach-E. The commercial spoofed the house lighting scene.

=== The Goldbergs ===
Christie Brinkley reprised her role as the Girl in the Red Ferrari, while Anthony Michael Hall played a theme park security guard in the seventh season of the television series The Goldbergs.

=== Other appearances ===
In the Family Guy episode "Boys Do Cry", there is a scene where a woman is driving next to Peter and gets hit by a truck, which mimics the Christie Brinkley car scene from the first Vacation; Lois responds "Eh, you marry Billy Joel, it's gonna happen one way or another". In "Blue Harvest", the Griswold Family is seen driving past the Death Star during the battle at the end. Chevy Chase and Beverly D'Angelo reprise their roles here.

In 2008, Christie Brinkley spoofed her role as "The Girl in the Red Ferrari" in a DirecTV commercial that recreated the swimming pool scene from Vacation by inter-splicing footage from the original film.

In the Scooby-Doo! Mystery Incorporated episodes "The Creeping Creatures", "Night Terrors", and "Stand and Deliver", the Griswold family appear as victims of various monsters.

In 2015, Christie Brinkley reprised her role as "The Girl in the Red Ferrari" as the mom in an Infiniti QX60 TV spot, in which she comments about another blonde beauty driving by in a red convertible. Ethan Embry, who played Rusty in the 1997 Vegas Vacation, plays the dad.

=== In popular culture ===
On December 25, 2014, in Clark, NJ, signs for the Garden State Parkway Exit 135 were vandalized from "Clark and Westfield" to "Clark Griswold", making national news headlines.

Australian hip hop artists, Hilltop Hoods issued a single "Clark Griswold" (July 2018) featuring Adrian Eagle, which reached the Australian Singles Chart top 50, and won the ARIA Award for Best Urban Release in 2018.

== See also ==
- List of National Lampoon films
