= The Christmas Letter =

- Official poster
- Directed by: Tori Hunter
- Screenplay by: Michael Cunningham
- Produced by: Angus Benfield; Michael Cunningham
- Starring: Angus Benfield; Chevy Chase; Randy Quaid
- Cinematography: Chase Bowman
- Edited by: Lex Benedict
- Music by: Vincent Gillioz
- Production company: LAMA Entertainment
- Distributed by: BMG Global
- Release date: November 12, 2024
- Running time: 95 minutes
- Country: United States
- Language: English

The Christmas Letter is a 2024 American Christmas comedy film written by Michael Cunningham, directed by Tori Hunter and starring Angus Benfield, Chevy Chase and Randy Quaid. It is Hunter's feature directorial debut.

== Cast ==
- Angus Benfield as Joe Michaels
- Chevy Chase as Norm De Plume
- Regina Schneider as Deb Michaels
- Brian Posehn as Frederick
- Kristoffer Polaha as Barry the Bartender
- Brian Doyle-Murray as Tony
- Randy Quaid as Rich the Delivery Guy
- Caley Chase as Francoise
- Lance Bonza as Clive Hammersmith
- Jeremy Warner as John Dablonski

== Production ==
In December 2023, it was announced that Chase was cast in the film. In January 2024, it was announced that Doyle-Murray and Quaid were also cast in the film. They reunite having worked together in the Vacation films (their casting in this film is most likely an allusion to the Christmas installment).

Filming occurred in Utica, New York in January 2024. Filming wrapped near the end of January that same year. Local personalities such as Utica mayor Michael Galime and WKTV anchor Kristen Copeland filmed cameo roles.

== Release ==
The film was released on November 12, 2024.
