= Hotel Hell Vacation =

- Poster
- Directed by: Bryan Buckley
- Written by: Publicis in the West
- Produced by: Cindy Becker; Kevin Byrne; Mino Jarjoura
- Starring: Chevy Chase; Beverly D'Angelo; Travis Greer; Bruce Fine
- Cinematography: John Lindley
- Edited by: Kelly Vander Linda
- Music by: Stephen Altman
- Production company: Hungry Man Productions
- Distributed by: HomeAway, Inc.
- Release date: February 7, 2010
- Running time: 14 minutes
- Language: English
- Budget: $2.5 million

Hotel Hell Vacation is an American online comedy short film released on February 7, 2010 on HomeAway's website. Chevy Chase and Beverly D'Angelo reprise their roles as Clark and Ellen Griswold. It was the first time Clark and Ellen had been seen in a Vacation film since 1997's Vegas Vacation; they later appeared together again in 2015's Vacation. The fourteen-minute short premiered as a series of commercials during the Super Bowl to help promote HomeAway, Inc. Although sanctioned by Warner Bros. (which holds the underlying rights to the Vacation series characters and concepts), this film was not sponsored by National Lampoon, Inc., which initiated the Vacation series.

HomeAway planned to use Chevy Chase and Beverly D’Angelo in a national advertising campaign to resemble National Lampoon’s Vacation. HomeAway purchased a replica of the Wagon Queen Family Truckster for use in the campaign. The first ad aired during the CBS television network broadcast of Super Bowl XLIV on February 7, 2010.

== Plot ==
Clark and Ellen Griswold (Chevy Chase and Beverly D'Angelo) are driving their Wagon Queen Family Truckster to visit their son Rusty and his family, who are spending their vacation by renting a beach house. Clark and Ellen make a detour for the night at the Le Grand Connard, a very sophisticated hotel. Clark begins seeing a brunette beauty around the hotel and is instantly attracted. After having mis-communications with the receptionist at the front desk (Robert Stephenson), Clark and Ellen finally get into their room, the Napoleon suite, which turns out to be very small. The adjacent rooms are also close enough for the guest next door, Doug, to hear every move that goes on inside their room.

While Ellen talks to Rusty (Travis Greer) and his wife and daughter through the web cam, Clark accidentally become visible on the web cam while nude in the shower. Clark and Ellen decide to spend the night having a fancy dinner in the hotel restaurant but are told that it is booked due to a "Shout Yourself Thin" seminar going on at the same time. The two try to order room service but to no avail. Clark later fries an egg on the flat iron. As the two leave, they notice they are being charged for Internet, phone book usage, complimentary water, etc. They are most likely charged for not buying towels from the receptionist. Clark and Ellen leave the hotel to visit Rusty and his family. Once there, Clark spots the brunette "hot girl" he saw at the hotel. He also sees a towel shaped like a goose, like the one the receptionist was trying to sell.

== Cast ==
- Chevy Chase as Clark Griswold
- Beverly D'Angelo as Ellen Griswold
- Meade Nichol as "Hot Girl"
- Seth Kirschner as Valet
- Robert Stephenson as Front Desk Receptionist
- Bruce Fine as Claude
- Travis Greer as Russell "Rusty" Griswold
- Alina Phelan as Rusty's Wife
- Ellodee Carpenter as Rusty's Daughter
- Lilli Birdsell as Restaurant Hostess
- James Hyde as Motivational Speaker
- Karen McClain as Conventioneer #1
- James Bannon as Conventioneer #2
- Caley Chase as Maid
- Glenn Rockowitz as Voice of Doug
- David Scully as Voice of Mel
- Matt McCain as Voice of Room Service Guy
- Hunter Buch as Rusty's Son
