= Vacation (2015 film) =

2015 American comedy film

- Theatrical release poster
- Directed by: John Francis Daley; Jonathan Goldstein
- Written by: John Francis Daley; Jonathan Goldstein
- Based on: National Lampoon's Vacation by John Hughes
- Produced by: Chris Bender; David Dobkin
- Starring: Ed Helms; Christina Applegate; Leslie Mann; Beverly D'Angelo; Chevy Chase
- Cinematography: Barry Peterson
- Edited by: Jamie Gross
- Music by: Mark Mothersbaugh
- Production companies: New Line Cinema; RatPac-Dune Entertainment; BenderSpink; Big Kid Pictures
- Distributed by: Warner Bros. Pictures
- Release date: July 29, 2015 (United States)
- Running time: 99 minutes
- Country: United States
- Language: English
- Budget: $31 million
- Box office: $107.2 million

Vacation is a 2015 American comedy road movie, written and directed by John Francis Daley and Jonathan Goldstein. It stars Ed Helms, Christina Applegate, Leslie Mann, Beverly D'Angelo, Chris Hemsworth, and Chevy Chase. It is a sequel to Vegas Vacation (1997) and the sixth installment of the National Lampoon's Vacation film series.

Vacation was released on July 29, 2015, by Warner Bros. Pictures. The film received generally negative reviews from critics but was a box office success grossing $107.2 million on a $31 million budget.

== Plot ==
Rusty Griswold is now a pilot for the low budget regional airline Econo-Air, living in suburban Chicago and in a stale relationship with his wife Debbie and their two sons, shy and awkward 14-year-old James, and naughty and sadistic 12-year-old Kevin, who constantly bullies and torments James. The gloating from his friends Jack and Nancy Peterson about a family trip they had in Paris does not help matters.

Desiring to relive his childhood family vacations and holiday gatherings, Rusty surprises his family with an alternative summer vacation. Rather than their annual trip to a cabin in Cheboygan, Michigan (which everyone else secretly hates and call Cheboring), he plans a road trip from Chicago to Walley World, just like he did with his parents and sister. For the trip, Rusty rents a Tartan Prancer, an ugly, over-complicated minivan built in Albania.

Along the way, the Griswolds take many detours. The first stop is in Memphis, where it is revealed that the now mild-mannered Debbie was an extremely promiscuous Tri Pi sorority sister nicknamed 'Debbie Do Anything'. To prove that she was the rebellious student, Debbie attempts to run an obstacle course while drunk, but fails miserably. While staying at a motel, James meets Adena, a girl his age that he saw while driving on the highway, but she is scared off by Rusty's failed attempts to be a "wingman".

In Arkansas, Rusty sees a beautiful woman driving a Ferrari, but the woman gets hit by a semi truck. They are led to a supposedly hidden hot spring by a "helpful" local, eventually discovering it is actually a raw sewage dump. They return to their van, only to find it has been broken into, sprayed with graffiti, and emptied of all of their possessions and cash.

Stopping in Plano, Texas, they get help from Rusty's sister Audrey and her attractive husband Stone Crandall. Rusty begins to fear problems in his relationship with Debbie due to her seeming acceptance of Stone's obvious sexual advances, but she calmly dismisses his suspicions. Stone then walks in on them and shows off his muscular body and oversized genitalia.

Spending the following night at a Wigwam Motel in Holbrook, Arizona, Rusty and Debbie sneak away and attempt to have sexual intercourse at the Four Corners Monument, where officers from all four states of Utah, Colorado, Arizona and New Mexico confront them and numerous other couples who obviously had the same idea. As the officers start arguing about who gets the arrest, Rusty and Debbie sneak away. James encounters Adena again, and finally asserts himself against Kevin thanks to her encouragement.

The next morning, they barely survive a Grand Canyon rafting ride when their guide becomes suicidal over being dumped by his fiancée right before launching. Later, the van runs out of gas in the middle of the desert, and Rusty's unfamiliarity with the key fob causes the vehicle to explode, leading him to walk off dispirited and alone, thinking about the disastrous trip.

Unfortunately, they have been tracked down by a seemingly unstable truck driver, who they think has been stalking them throughout the trip. In actuality, he has been trying to return Debbie's missing wedding ring. He ends up giving them a lift to San Francisco.

There, they spend the night at a bed and breakfast run by Rusty's parents, Clark and Ellen. They intend to fly home the next day, but Rusty and Debbie face each other about their stale marriage and decide to start over again. With some encouragement from Clark the next morning, Rusty borrows his father's Wagon Queen Family Truckster and drives Debbie and the boys to Walley World to ride their newest roller coaster, the Velociraptor.

After spending the entire day waiting in line, they are cut off by Ethan, a rival pilot whom Rusty knows from Chicago, and his family before the announcement of the park's closing. A fight breaks out, which the Griswolds win, forcing the other family to flee. The Griswolds finally board the ride, but it stalls halfway up the butterfly inversion, and they are rescued several hours later.

Rusty uses his airline connections to book a vacation in Paris for just Debbie and himself after sending the boys home where their neighbors will look after them. On the plane to Paris, they are seated in jump seats next to a lavatory. Debbie is exasperated to learn that it will be a 12-hour flight.

== Cast ==
- Ed Helms as Russell "Rusty" Griswold, a pilot for Econo-Air living in Suburban Chicago
- Christina Applegate as Debbie Fletcher-Griswold, Rusty's wife.
- Skyler Gisondo as James Griswold, Rusty and Debbie's older son.
- Steele Stebbins as Kevin Griswold, Rusty and Debbie's younger son.
- Leslie Mann as Audrey Griswold-Crandall, Rusty's sister.
- Chris Hemsworth as Stone Crandall, an up-and-coming anchorman and Audrey's husband.
- Chevy Chase as Clark Griswold, Rusty and Audrey's father who now owns a bed and breakfast in San Francisco.
- Beverly D'Angelo as Ellen Griswold, Rusty and Audrey's mother who now owns a bed and breakfast in San Francisco.
- Ron Livingston as Ethan, an airline pilot and Rusty's rival.
- Charlie Day as Chad, a suicidal river rafting guide who was recently dumped by his girlfriend.
- Catherine Missal as Adena, James's love interest.
- Norman Reedus as Trucker, an unnamed truck driver who stalks the Griswold family.
- Keegan-Michael Key as Jack Peterson, a friend of the Griswold family.
- Regina Hall as Nancy Peterson, the wife of Jack and friend of the Griswold family.
- Elizabeth Gillies as Heather, a member of the Tri Pi sorority that is a fan of Debbie.
- Tim Heidecker as Utah Cop
- Nick Kroll as Colorado Cop
- Kaitlin Olson as Arizona Cop
- Michael Peña as New Mexico Cop
- Hannah Davis Jeter as The Girl in the Red Ferrari, a different girl driving a Red Ferrari who tries to flirt with Rusty only to get struck by a semi-trailer truck.
- David Clennon as Co-Pilot
- Colin Hanks as Jake
- Ryan Cartwright as Terry
- John Francis Daley as Robert

Additionally, Anthony Michael Hall, Dana Barron, Jason Lively, Dana Hill, Johnny Galecki, Juliette Lewis, Ethan Embry, and Marisol Nichols have photographic appearances as young Rusty and Audrey in photos from National Lampoon's Vacation, National Lampoon's European Vacation, National Lampoon's Christmas Vacation, and Vegas Vacation.

== Production ==
=== Development ===
In February 2010, it was announced by New Line Cinema (owned by Warner Bros., which released the previous films) that a new Vacation film was being produced. The executive producer was Steven Mnuchin. It was produced by David Dobkin and written and directed by John Francis Daley and Jonathan Goldstein.

=== Casting ===
Anthony Michael Hall, Johnny Galecki, and Ethan Embry were all offered to reprise the role of Rusty Griswold. However, it is unknown whether they declined or if the production passed on them. In July 2012, it was announced that Ed Helms would star in the sequel as Rusty Griswold, who now has his own family misadventures on the road. Before Helms was cast, Will Ferrell, Nick Swardson, Jason Sudeikis, Adam Sandler, Dwayne Johnson, Ashton Kutcher, Dax Shepard, Michael Rosenbaum, Jack Black, Rob Huebel, Jason Segel, Justin Theroux, and Danny McBride were considered to play Rusty. On March 28, 2013, Variety announced that original series stars Beverly D'Angelo and Chevy Chase were in talks to reprise their roles, most likely in the form of a torch-passing cameo role. No mention was made of other series regulars, such as Randy Quaid's Cousin Eddie.

On April 23, 2013, it was reported that the film had been delayed due to creative differences. Later, Chris Hemsworth and Charlie Day were also reported to co-star. Skyler Gisondo and Steele Stebbins played Rusty Griswold's sons along with Helms and Christina Applegate. On September 15, Leslie Mann joined the film to play Rusty's sister, Audrey Griswold. On September 29, Keegan-Michael Key and Regina Hall were cast to play family friends of the Griswolds.

On October 10, director Daley revealed in an interview that he might have a cameo with Samm Levine and Martin Starr, which would be a reunion of cult comedy show Freaks and Geeks, though it was not confirmed. On November 12, four actors joined to play Four Corners cops, Tim Heidecker, Nick Kroll, Kaitlin Olson, and Michael Peña.

=== Filming ===
Principal photography began on September 16, 2014, in Atlanta, Georgia. On September 16, scenes were filmed on location at the Olympic Flame Restaurant.

The Twelve Oaks during filming

On September 30 and October 1, 2014, scenes were filmed on location at The Twelve Oaks Bed and Breakfast in historic Covington, Georgia. The Twelve Oaks was staged as Christina Applegate's character's sorority house, Triple Pi, and the location of her attempt to run the obstacle course once more to prove that she is the Chug Run champion.

Other scenes were shot around Piedmont and 6th avenues from October 6 to 8, including at the Shellmont Inn. On October 22, 2014, scenes were filmed at the U.S. National Whitewater Center in Charlotte, North Carolina. Scenes for Walley World were filmed at Six Flags Over Georgia.

In a similar vein to the original film's "Wagon Queen Family Truckster", the film features a custom-designed minivan named the "Tartan Prancer". Dubbed the "Honda of Albania", it is a heavily modified Toyota Previa and features unconventional styling elements such as a mirror-image front and rear clip, complete with two sets of headlights (pulled from the Land Rover LR3/Discovery) and rearview mirrors, as well as dashboard buttons marked by nonsensical symbols. As part of a promotional tie-in with the film, Edmunds.com released a tongue-in-cheek review comparing the Tartan Prancer against the 2015 Honda Odyssey.

== Music ==
The musical score for the film was composed by Mark Mothersbaugh. A soundtrack album was released by WaterTower Music on July 24, 2015. In addition to Mothersbaugh's score, it features many contemporary songs, along with several renditions of Lindsey Buckingham's "Holiday Road" (including a remixed and remastered version of the original that plays at the start of the film, and again near the end).

== Release ==
The film was originally set to be released on November 13, 2015, and October 9, 2015, but it was moved to July 31, 2015, before finally being pushed up to July 29, 2015, the 32nd anniversary of the release of the first Vacation film. Warner Bros. spent a total of $35.2 million on advertisement for the film.

=== Home media ===
The film was released on DVD and Blu-ray on November 3, 2015, by Warner Home Video.

== Reception ==
=== Box office ===
Vacation grossed $58.9 million in North America and $45.8 million in other territories for a worldwide total of $104.7 million, against a budget of $31 million.

The film grossed $1.2 million from its early Tuesday preview showings, and a combined $6.3 million on Wednesday and Thursday. In its opening weekend, it grossed $14.7 million, finishing second at the box office behind Mission: Impossible – Rogue Nation ($55.5 million).

=== Critical response ===
On review aggregator website Rotten Tomatoes, Vacation holds an approval rating of 27% based on 177 reviews and an average rating of 4.30/10. The site's consensus reads, "Borrowing a basic storyline from the film that inspired it but forgetting the charm, wit, and heart, Vacation is yet another nostalgia-driven retread that misses the mark." On Metacritic, it has a score of 34 out of 100 based on 33 critics, indicating "generally unfavorable reviews". On CinemaScore, audiences gave the film an average grade of "B" on an A+ to F scale.

Neil Genzlinger of The New York Times gave the film a positive review and praised the Kevin Griswold character, saying, "The kid with the potty mouth may cost Warner Bros. some business at the box office, but in a strange way he elevates Vacation, a very funny R-rated movie with a PG-13 heart." Chris Nashawaty of Entertainment Weekly gave it a "B−" rating and wrote, "The new Vacation is both better than I'd feared and not as hilarious as I'd hoped. It's intermittently funny and instantly forgettable." Richard Roeper of the Chicago Sun-Times wrote, "It's a vile, odious disaster populated with unlikable, dopey characters bumbling through mean-spirited set pieces that rely heavily on slapstick fight scenes, scatological sight gags and serial vomiting." Rolling Stone reviewer Peter Travers gave it 1.5 out of 4 stars, saying: "Leslie Mann and wild-card Chris Hemsworth, as her cock-flashing hubby, get the heartiest hoots. The rest is comic history warmed over."

=== Accolades ===
Award	Category	Nominee	Result	Ref.
Golden Raspberry Awards	Worst Supporting Actor	Chevy Chase	Nominated	
MTV Movie Awards	Best Kiss	Leslie Mann and Chris Hemsworth	Nominated	
