= Donny's Bar Mitzvah =

- Directed by: Jonathan Kaufman
- Written by: Jonathan Kaufman
- Starring: Steele Stebbins
- Release date: March 23, 2021
- Running time: 79 minutes
- Country: United States
- Language: English

Donny's Bar Mitzvah is a 2021 American comedy drama film written and directed by Jonathan Kaufman and starring Steele Stebbins.

== Cast ==
- Steele Stebbins as Donny
- John DeLuca as Bobby
- Danny Trejo as himself
- Isabelle Anaya as Hannah
- Connor Del Rio as Valet Mike
- Jeremy Tardy as Gerald

== Release ==
The film was released via iTunes and Amazon Prime Video on March 23, 2021.

== Reception ==
The film has a 50% rating on Rotten Tomatoes based on eight reviews. Brian Costello of Common Sense Media awarded the film one star out of five. Alan Ng of Film Threat rated the film a 9 out of 10.
