= Vegas Vacation =

1997 comedy film by Stephen Kessler

- Theatrical release poster
- Directed by: Stephen Kessler
- Screenplay by: Elisa Bell
- Story by: Elisa Bell; Bob Ducsay
- Based on: Characters by John Hughes
- Produced by: Jerry Weintraub
- Starring: Chevy Chase; Beverly D'Angelo; Randy Quaid; Miriam Flynn; Ethan Embry; Marisol Nichols; Shae D'lyn; Wayne Newton; Siegfried & Roy; Sid Caesar; Julio Oscar Mechoso; Wallace Shawn
- Cinematography: William A. Fraker
- Edited by: Seth Flaum
- Music by: Joel McNeely
- Production company: Jerry Weintraub Productions
- Distributed by: Warner Bros.
- Release date: February 14, 1997
- Running time: 93 minutes
- Country: United States
- Language: English
- Budget: $25 million
- Box office: $36.4 million (US)

Vegas Vacation is a 1997 American comedy film directed by Stephen Kessler in his feature directorial debut. It is the fourth installment in National Lampoon’s Vacation film series, and was written by Elisa Bell, based on a story by Bell and Bob Ducsay. The film stars Chevy Chase, Beverly D'Angelo, Randy Quaid, Wayne Newton, Ethan Embry, and Wallace Shawn. It tells the story of Clark Griswold taking his family to Las Vegas to renew his vows to Ellen as the series' usual hilarity occurs.

Vegas Vacation was released by Warner Bros. on February 14, 1997. The film opened at #4 at the box office and grossed over $36.4 million domestically. Vegas Vacation is the first theatrical Vacation film to not carry the National Lampoon label or have any involvement from John Hughes. Also, this is the final film to take place during the original storyline, as well as the last released before National Lampoon magazine folded. There would not be another theatrically released (Note: Technically, this film was followed by Christmas Vacation 2: Cousin Eddie's Island Adventure. However, the film was made for television and is generally ignored by viewers.) Vacation film until 2015, when a standalone sequel was produced.

== Plot ==
Clark Griswold, having produced a high-quality food preservative for his employer, is granted a bonus and vacation time. He announces to his family that he is taking them to celebrate and to renew wedding vows with his wife, Ellen. Excitement wanes, however, when Clark says they are headed to Las Vegas. Ellen and teenage daughter, Audrey, have their doubts, as Las Vegas is not known for its family-friendly atmosphere, while teenage son Rusty is more enthusiastic.

Upon arriving in Vegas, the Griswolds attend a Siegfried & Roy show, and they visit Cousin Eddie Johnson, who is married to Catherine, Ellen's maternal cousin. Eddie and Catherine now live in the desert north of Las Vegas on what used to be a hydrogen-bomb test site. While on a group tour of the Hoover Dam led by guide Arty, Clark becomes separated from the group after accidentally creating a leak in the dam's interior walkways and is forced to climb the scaffolding to the top of the dam to get out.

That night, they are surprised to find that tickets to a Wayne Newton concert have been delivered to their hotel room, along with a dress for Ellen. They go to the concert, only to realize that Newton sent the dress. While singing, he brings Ellen on stage to sing with him and visits their table. Rusty buys a fake ID and has incredible luck winning, earning multiple cars and gaining the attention of an entourage of high-rollers, with whom he is soon affiliated.

The next day, the family agree to an "alone day" and are left to their own devices. Clark goes to a casino and becomes addicted to gambling. Rusty parties with his entourage of high-rollers. Audrey starts hanging out with Eddie's free-spirited exotic dancer daughter Vicki and her friends. Ellen spends time with Wayne Newton, who has feelings for her.

Clark's obsession with gambling leads to a furious Ellen and kids deserting him. Audrey goes to a strip club with Vicki and gets a job as a go-go dancer. Ellen goes to Wayne's for dinner. Cousin Eddie — who has money buried in his front yard — tries to come to Clark's rescue in return for everything the Griswolds have done for him and his family. Clark and Eddie go to a casino to get their money back, but Clark gambles away Eddie's money too. He then realizes he no longer cares about getting his money back but needs to get his family back.

Clark gathers his family from around Vegas and admits to losing all of their money. With only two dollars between the entire family, they bet on a game of keno, picking numbers important to them like the kid's birthdays and Clark's old football jersey number. They sit next to an elderly man who compliments Clark on his family and hints that he has been lonely all of his life. Out of sympathy, Clark tells the man to consider himself part of the Griswold family for the night. The man happily accepts Clark's offer, and both parties begin the game. The Griswolds are at first optimistic as their numbers are picked, but after several missed numbers they realize they have lost. They sit together in silence. Suddenly, the man next to them declares that he has won the game. In his burst of joy, he slips in and out of consciousness while Ellen sends Rusty for help. The man revives long enough to whisper a message to Clark. Confused, Clark tells Ellen that the man said "take the ticket" as he winks to Clark. When the casino security guards and paramedics arrive, they declare the man dead. They tell the Griswolds that his name was Mr. Ellis and he would have given anything for a friend.

With their newfound winnings, Clark and Ellen renew their wedding vows in the presence of Eddie's family. Clark then gives Eddie $5,000 to repay his kindness. The Griswolds drive home in the four cars Rusty won on the slot machines: a red Dodge Viper, a maroon Ford Mustang, a black Hummer H1, and a white Ford Aspire.

== Cast ==
- Chevy Chase as Clark W. Griswold
- Beverly D'Angelo as Ellen Griswold
- Ethan Embry as Russell "Rusty" Griswold. He was portrayed by Anthony Michael Hall, Jason Lively, and Johnny Galecki in the previous films.
- Marisol Nichols as Audrey Griswold. She was portrayed by Dana Barron, Dana Hill, and Juliette Lewis in the previous films.
- Randy Quaid as Eddie Johnson, the cousin-in-law of Clark and Ellen
- Wayne Newton as himself
- Wallace Shawn as Marty, a snooty blackjack dealer
- Miriam Flynn as Catherine Johnson, the cousin of Ellen and wife of Eddie
- Siegfried & Roy as themselves
- Sid Caesar as Mr. Ellis
- Julio Oscar Mechoso as a limousine driver
- Shae D'lyn as Vicki Johnson, the daughter of Catherine and Eddie who now works as a go-go dancer. She was previously portrayed by Jane Krakowski in the first film.
- Juliette Brewer as Ruby Sue Johnson. She was portrayed by Ellen Hamilton Latzen in the previous film.
- Zack Moyes as Denny Johnson, the son of Catherine and Eddie who has face piercings enough that his mouth has been closed by some of them
- Christie Brinkley as the "Girl in the Red Ferrari"
- Julia Sweeney as Mirage desk clerk
- Jerry Weintraub as "Jilly from Philly", a gambler who befriends Rusty
- Toby Huss as a Frank Sinatra impersonator who Rusty gets a fake ID from (uncredited)

== Production ==
Vegas Vacation is the fourth film in the Vacation series. John Hughes wrote the first and third films, and received credit for the second, but had no involvement with Vegas Vacation. He had shown dissatisfaction with how the series had essentially turned into a star vehicle for Chevy Chase, and noted that Warner Bros. Pictures never told him about Vegas Vacation, only hearing about it by reading a trade magazine. When approached by disappointed fans, Hughes insisted that he "had nothing to do with it!" Vegas Vacation was written by television film writer Elisa Bell and directed by Stephen Kessler, marking their feature film debuts.

Before Las Vegas was chosen as a setting, Chase thought of an idea in which the Griswolds become stranded on an island, similar to the Swiss Family Robinson story. A few months before filming started, it was reported that Vegas Vacation would involve the Griswolds staying at a fictional Wally World megaresort, named after the theme park in the original film. Matty Simmons produced earlier films in the series, and was also attached to Vegas Vacation as a producer early on, before resigning: "I was at an impasse with one of the executives on the movie and we just couldn't agree on anything. I sat there for months and finally I said 'Here, go make the movie.'" Simmons was instead credited as an executive producer. Chase had starred in several poorly received films in the years leading up to Vegas Vacation. Kessler said of the film, "I really wanted to make it a return to the old Chevy Chase that I loved, but for various reasons, it didn't work," stating further that "there was too much studio involvement."

Ethan Embry and Marisol Nichols became the fourth different set of actors to play the Griswold children, Audrey and Rusty. This fact is referenced early in the film when Clark Griswold comments that he hardly recognizes his children anymore. Brittany Murphy was originally cast to play Audrey, but turned down the role. Nichols did not think she would be cast due to her Latina heritage and the fact that she had never acted in a film before. She auditioned repeatedly for three months before receiving the part.

=== Filming ===
The film was primarily shot on location in Las Vegas, where filming began on June 4, 1996. Production was expected to last two and a half months there, with approximately 10 days of filming also planned for studios in southern California.

Filming at Hoover Dam took place during the first month of shooting. One scene involved Chase's stunt double, John Robotham, swinging from a rope and slamming into the dam face. Film crews did several takes of the scene, which involved Robotham being attached to a series of ropes and bolts 637 feet above the dam's power plant. Later that month, filming took place at Las Vegas' Chapel of the Bells, where the film's producer Jerry Weintraub and his wife Jane Morgan were married in the mid-1960s. Weintraub also appears in the film as "Jilly from Philly".

Extensive footage was shot at The Mirage resort; owner Steve Wynn closed portions of the property to allow for filming, which included the resort's diving dolphins and its Siegfried & Roy show. Chase filmed scenes involving the show's tigers in July 1996. Filming also took place on soundstages at the Las Vegas Video Sound Film Production Center, which included the interior of Eddie's trailer; exterior filming took place at Jean Dry Lake.

Wayne Newton, who plays a fictionalized version of himself, requested a change to the script to help preserve his public image. Originally, Newton was to tell Ellen that he wants her to become a "Newton broad," to which she asks for clarification. According to Newton, "my answer to that was written in the script 'A nose job, a boob job and a butt job.' And then I was to walk over to a wall and pull a string and a curtain opens up and there are 200 women who have had those particular things done. And so I went to the director and said, 'Listen, this won't work. It's pushing the envelope'".

Newton's real home, Casa de Shenandoah, was among the filming locations. Others included the MGM Grand resort, the Klondike Hotel and Casino, O'Sheas Casino, a neon sign storage lot owned by YESCO, and the Fremont Street Experience.

== Reception ==
=== Box office ===
Vegas Vacation was released to cinemas in the United States on February 14, 1997. The film was later released on home video and to television.

=== Critical response ===
On the review aggregator website Rotten Tomatoes, 15% of 33 critics' reviews are positive, with an average rating of 3.8/10. The website's consensus reads: "The Vacation franchise hits rock-bottom in this corny and tepid trip to sinfully laugh-free city." By contrast, the Popcornmeter which measures general audience ratings has a more favorable score of 51%. Metacritic, which uses a weighted average, assigned the film a score of 20 out of 100, based on 10 critics, indicating "generally unfavorable" reviews.

The film was nominated for The Sequel Nobody Was Clamoring For at the 1997 Stinkers Bad Movie Awards but lost to Free Willy 3: The Rescue. Although Embry is well known for his role in the film, he said in 2015 "let's face it, it's a horrible movie. It's not anywhere as good as the first one or the Christmas one. Those were home runs!"

== Sequel ==
A sequel titled Vacation, was released in 2015.

== See also ==
- List of films set in Las Vegas
