= Miriam Flynn =

American voice actress

- Occupations: Actor, voice actor
- Years active: 1980-present

Miriam Flynn is an American voice and character actress. She is best known as Cousin Catherine in the National Lampoon's Vacation films and Grandma Longneck in The Land Before Time franchises. She has acted in several films and television series; the latter including a recurring role as Sister Helen on the Fox/WB sitcom Grounded for Life.

== Career ==
=== Second City ===
Before breaking into television, Flynn was a member of the Second City improv troupe in 1975. She appeared on stage alongside Shelley Long, George Wendt, Andrea Martin, Catherine O'Hara, and James Belushi.

=== Film and television ===
Flynn was a regular cast member on The Tim Conway Show, a comedy-variety show that aired on CBS from March 1980 through summer 1981. She then starred on the short-lived ABC sitcom Maggie. She appeared in the Cheers episode "Love Thy Neighbor" as Phyllis Henshaw, Norm and Vera Peterson's next-door neighbor. In fall 1988, she co-starred in the CBS sitcom Raising Miranda.

In 1995, Flynn was the voice of Maa the Ewe in the film, Babe. She was a regular cast member in Season 1 of Malcolm & Eddie; playing Kelly, a bar owner and landlord to the main characters. From 2001 to 2005, she played the recurring character Sister Helen on the Fox/WB sitcom Grounded for Life. In 2004, she played Coop's mom in Megas XLR. Flynn also appeared in an episode of George Lopez; playing the role of Brenda, a bank employee.

As a voice artist, Flynn has been featured in The Land Before Time series, as Grandma Longneck, on both Taz-Mania and What-a-Mess as the title character's mother, Jean, as Poil in The Spooktacular New Adventures of Casper, and on Family Guy. She has also voiced Rudy's mother, Millie Tabootie on the Nickelodeon show, ChalkZone and Aunt Vera on the Cartoon Network show, Ben 10.

Some of Flynn's best known film roles have been as Cousin Catherine in National Lampoon's Vacation (1983), National Lampoon's Christmas Vacation (1989), Vegas Vacation (1997) and National Lampoon's Christmas Vacation 2 (2003). Other acting roles include First Family (1980), National Lampoon's Class Reunion (1982), Mr. Mom (1983), Family Ties (1986), For Keeps (1988), 18 Again! (1988), Stealing Home (1988), Lonely Hearts (1991), Evolution (2001), Wieners (2008), About Fifty (2011) and Bucky Larson: Born to Be a Star (2011), Stranger Things: Tales from '85 (2025).

== Filmography ==
=== Film ===
Year	Title	Role	Notes
1980	First Family	Feebleman's Secretary	
1982	National Lampoon's Class Reunion	Bunny Packard	
1983	Mr. Mom	Annette	
1983	National Lampoon's Vacation	Cousin Catherine	
1988	For Keeps	Donna Elliot	
1988	18 Again!	Betty Watson	
1988	Stealing Home	Mrs. Parks	
1989	National Lampoon's Christmas Vacation	Cousin Catherine Johnson	
1991	Lonely Hearts	Helen	
1995	Babe	Maa	Voice
1996	Waiting for Guffman	Costume Dresser	
1996	Carpool	Franklin's Mom	Voice
1997	Vegas Vacation	Cousin Catherine	
1997	The Land Before Time V: The Mysterious Island	Grandma Longneck	Voice
1998	The Land Before Time VI: The Secret of Saurus Rock	Grandma Longneck	Voice
2000	Chump Change	Bussler Waitress	Voice
2000	The Best of Dr. Seuss	Yookie-Ann Sue / Teacher	Voice
2000	Alvin and the Chipmunks Meet the Wolfman	Principal Milliken	Voice
2000	The Land Before Time VII: The Stone of Cold Fire	Grandma Longneck	Voice
2000	The Emperor's New Groove	Piñata Lady	Voice
2001	Evolution	Grace	
2001	The Land Before Time VIII: The Big Freeze	Grandma Longneck	Voice
2002	The Land Before Time IX: Journey to Big Water	Grandma Longneck, Diplodocus Mom	Voice
2003	The Land Before Time X: The Great Longneck Migration	Grandma Longneck	Voice
2005	The Land Before Time XI: Invasion of the Tinysauruses	Grandma Longneck	Voice
2006	The Land Before Time XII: The Great Day of the Flyers	Grandma Longneck	Voice
2007	The Land Before Time XIII: The Wisdom of Friends	Grandma Longneck	Voice
2008	Wieners	Ben's Mom	
2009	Nowhere to Hide	Priscella	
2011	About Fifty	Nancy	
2011	Bucky Larson: Born to Be a Star	Debbie Larson	
2014	All Stars	Miriam Carson	
2016	The Land Before Time XIV: Journey of the Brave	Grandma Longneck	Voice, direct-to-video
2016	Taking Liberty	Mrs. Batesome	
2019	Extracurricular Activities	Mrs. Reed	
2023	Self Reliance	Becky Ann	

=== Television ===
Year	Title	Role	Notes
1979	Who's Watching the Kids?	Ms. Collins	Episode: "Good News, Bad News"
1981–1982	Maggie	Maggie Weston	8 episodes
1983	Gimme a Break!	Mrs. Brandt	Episode: "Glenlawn Street Blues"
1983	Full House	Boobie Hall	Television film
1984	Her Life as a Man	Sheila	Television film
1984	Mr. Success	Helen Silt	Television film
1984	Silver Spoons	Myrna Lippincottleman	Episode: "Twas the Night Before Christmas"
1984, 1991	Night Court	Helen Liptz / Phyllis Simon	2 episodes
1985	Webster	Jan Morgan	Episode: "The Uh-Oh Feeling"
1985	Snorks	Additional voices	Episode: "Snorkitis Is Nothing to Sneeze At/The Whole Toot and Nothing But..."
1985	Cheers	Phyllis Henshaw	Episode: "Love Thy Neighbor"
1985	Riptide	Marian Flynn	Episode: "Robin and Marian"
1986	Family Ties	Mrs. Carpenter	Episode: "My Buddy"
1986	Christmas Every Day	Helen / Franny / Will	Television film
1986–1990	The Magical World of Disney	Gandra Dee / Helen	3 episodes
1986–1987	Foofur	Additional voices	16 episodes
1987, 1988	CBS Summer Playhouse	Cookie Lippman / Betty	2 episodes
1988	The New Yogi Bear Show	Additional voices	4 episodes
1988	Raising Miranda	Joan Hoodenpyle	9 episodes
1988, 1989	The Tracey Ullman Show	Miss Clark / Jill	2 episodes
1988, 1993	L.A. Law	Madeline Meyer / Edie Moffit	2 episodes
1989	Hound Town	Sasha	Television film
1989	Dear John	Penny	Episode: "The Other Group"
1989	The Butter Battle Book	Yookie-Ann Sue	Voice, television film
1989–1990	DuckTales	Gandra Dee	Voice, 7 episodes
1990	The Simpsons	Miss Barr	Voice, episode: "Moaning Lisa"
1990	Murder, She Wrote	Vi	Episode: "Murder -- According to Maggie"
1990	Monsters	Luann	Episode: "Murray's Monster"
1990	The Flockens	Patricia Flocken	Television film
1991	Murphy Brown	Ellen Smith	Episode: "The Smiths Go to Washington"
1991–1995	Taz-Mania	Various voices	40 episodes
1991–1996	Bobby's World	Additional voices	7 episodes
1992	Herman's Head	Dr. Nina Bergstrom	Episode: "That's What Friends Aren't For"
1992	Stand by Your Man	Adrienne Stone / Arlene Stone	5 episodes
1992	Doogie Howser, M.D.	Real Estate Agent	Episode: "Doogie Doesn't Live Here Anymore"
1993	Picket Fences	Alice Freeman	Episode: "Bad Moons Rising"
1993	Civil Wars	Dr. Pleasance	Episode: "A Liver Runs Through It"
1993	Mighty Max	Professor MacDougall	Voice, episode: "Werewolves of Dunneglen"
1994	The Second Half	Rachel	Episode: "Far and Awry"
1994	Duckman	Additional voices	Episode: "It's the Thing of the Principal"
1994	The Nanny	Country Club Manager	Episode: "I Don't Remember Mama"
1994	Madman of the People	Lorraine	Episode: "Jack Has Left the Building"
1994–1995	The Tick	Charles' Mother	Voice, 4 episodes
1995	Indictment: The McMartin Trial	Judge Bobb	Television film
1995	From the Mixed-Up Files of Mrs. Basil E. Frankweiler	Evelyn Kincaid	Television film
1995	Letter to My Killer	Personnel Director	Television film
1995	Hope & Gloria	Dr. Rose	Episode: "A Midsummer Night's Trim"
1995	Murder One	Robin Zeitlin	Episode: "Chapter Eight"
1995	Life with Louie	Aunt Mimi	Voice, episode: "The Fourth Thursday in November"
1995	Partners	Saleswoman	Episode: "Fourteen Minutes?"
1995	What-a-Mess	Mother	Voice, 3 episodes
1996	The Sylvester & Tweety Mysteries	Greta	Voice, episode: "Don't Polka Me"
1996	Quack Pack	Mrs. Robinson	Voice, episode: "The Unusual Suspects"
1996–1997	Malcolm & Eddie	Kelly	6 episodes
1996–1997	The Spooktacular New Adventures of Casper	Poil	Voice, 16 episodes
1997	The Legend of Calamity Jane	Lonely Sue	Voice, 13 episodes
1997	The Practice	Mary Stokes	Episode: "Part IV"
1997	Jenny	Mother Superior	Episode: "Pilot"
1997	Pinky and the Brain	Woman	Voice, episode: "Leggo My Ego"
1998	Ally McBeal	Karen Poole	Episode: "The Playing Field"
1998	3rd Rock from the Sun	Suzie Martin	Episode: "Stuck with Dick"
1998	Brooklyn South	Dee / Alison Williams	Episode: "Cinnamon Buns"
1998	Buffy the Vampire Slayer	Mrs. Frank	Episode: "I Only Have Eyes for You"
1998	The New Batman Adventures	Zaftig Lady	Voice, episode: "Mean Seasons"
1998	Dharma & Greg	Jasmine	Episode: "Unarmed and Dangerous"
1998	Star Trek: Deep Space Nine	Midwife	Episode: "Covenant"
1998	Rugrats	Customer, Party Goer	Voice, episode: "Baking Dil"
1999	Batman Beyond	Newscaster	Voice, episode: "Disappearing Inque"
2001	Malcolm in the Middle	Cooking Teacher	Episode: "Reese Cooks"
2001	Static Shock	Ms. Pettibone	Voice, episode: "Tantrum"
2001	A Kitty Bobo Show	Mrs. Bobo	Voice, television short
2001	Providence	Mrs. Hartford	Episode: "You Can Count on Me"
2001	Once and Again	Gayle Stephenson	Episode: "Destiny Turns on the Radio"
2001–2005	Grounded for Life	Sister Helen	22 episodes
2002, 2003	Judging Amy	Winkie	2 episodes
2002–2008	ChalkZone	Millie Tabootie	Voice, 18 episodes
2003	George Lopez	Brenda	Episode: "George vs. George"
2003	Ozzy & Drix	Drixeen	Voice, episode: "An Out of Body Experience"
2003	National Lampoon's Christmas Vacation 2	Catherine Johnson	Television film
2004	Happy Family	Barb	Episode: "Rules and Girls"
2004	Century City	Judge	Episode: "Only You"
2004	Second Time Around	Belinda	Episode: "Secrets"
2004	Megas XLR	Coop's Mother, Woman, Old Lady	Voice, 3 episodes
2005	Fielder's Choice	Rose	Television film
2006	Ben 10	Vera Tennyson	Voice, episode: "Permanent Retirement"
2006	'Til Death	Bonnie Woodcock	Episode: "Your Mother or Your Wife"
2007	Las Vegas	Betty	Episode: "Wagers of Sin"
2007	The Young and the Restless	Edna McCallister	Episode #1.8585
2007	Desperate Housewives	Dr. Berman	2 episodes
2007	The Land Before Time	Grandma Longneck	Voice, 5 episodes
2007	Cavemen	Rose Claybrook	Episode: "Nick Get Job"
2007	Grey's Anatomy	Gretchen Bitzer	Episode: "The Heart of the Matter"
2007	Boston Legal	Gretchen Winters	Episode: "The Object of My Affection"
2008	Cranberry Christmas	Granny / Sister Whiskers	Voice, television film
2009	Big Love	Aunt Dot	Episode: "Come, Ye Saints"
2009	Married Not Dead	Ms. Giamatti	Television film
2010	The Life & Times of Tim	Woman in Church	Voice, episode: "The Comeback Sermon"
2010	Good Luck Charlie	Jane	Episode: "Kit and Kaboodle"
2011	Curb Your Enthusiasm	Margaret	Episode: "The Safe House"
2011	Zeke and Luther	Mrs. Smorlov	Episode: "Lie Hard"
2012–2013	Suburgatory	Helen	7 episodes
2014	Summer with Cimorelli	Mrs. Cimorelli	Episode: "Pretty Little Cimorelliars"
2014	Bones	Fancie Von Mertens	Episode: "The Mutilation of the Master Manipulator"
2015	Scandal	Mrs. Ambruso	Episode: "Put a Ring on It"
2015	Murder in the First	Dr. Hopkins	Episode: "Nothing but the Truth"
2015, 2016	Liv and Maddie	Mrs. Snodgrass	2 episodes
2016	iZombie	Drake's Mother	2 episodes
2016	The Middle	Female Clerk	Episode: "A Tough Pill to Swallow"
2017	The Carmichael Show	Monica	Episode: "Shoot-Up-Able"
2017	School of Rock	Nana Gert	Episode: "The Other Side of Summer"
2017	NCIS: Los Angeles	Marilyn	Episode: "All is Bright"
2019	If You Give a Mouse a Cookie	Band Leader	Voice, episode: "Parade Day"
2019	Fancy Nancy	Fay Clancy	Voice, episode: "The Amazing Adventures of Grammy and Poppy"
2020	Mom	Arlene	Episode: "Somebody's Grandmother and the A-List"
2021	The Unicorn	Mrs. Burbage	Episode: "In Memory Of..."
2023; 2026	Shrinking	Pam	2 episodes
2023	The Lincoln Lawyer	Donna	Episode: "Cui Boni"
2026	Stranger Things: Tales from '85	Flo (voice of the police dispatcher)	Episode: "Chapter Nine: The Suspect"
