= Within (film) =

- Official poster
- Directed by: Philip Claydon
- Written by: Gary Dauberman
- Produced by: Rick Alvarez; Peter Safran
- Starring: Michael Vartan; Erin Moriarty; Nadine Velazquez; JoBeth Williams
- Cinematography: James Kniest
- Edited by: Eric A. Sears
- Music by: Benjamin Wallfisch
- Production companies: New Line Cinema; Alvarez Company; The Safran Company
- Distributed by: Warner Bros. Pictures
- Release dates: 7 October 2016 (India); 18 October 2016 (United States)
- Running time: 99 minutes
- Country: United States
- Language: English

Within (also known as Crawlspace) is a 2016 American horror thriller film directed by Philip Claydon, starring Michael Vartan, Erin Moriarty, Nadine Velazquez and JoBeth Williams.

== Plot ==
A widower's daughter quickly realizes something is not right after her family moves into a new home. Her father first doesn't believe her, but is soon affected by the events in the house himself.

The family attempts to fight the evil that hides in their walls and soon discovers they haven't been alone in the house.

== Cast ==
- Michael Vartan as John Alexander
- Erin Moriarty as Hannah Alexander, John's daughter with his deceased wife
- Nadine Velazquez as Melanie Alexander, John's second wife
- JoBeth Williams as Rosemary Fletcher
- Ronnie Gene Blevins as Ray Walsh
- Dorian Kingi as David
- Blake Jenner as Tommy
- Misty Upham as Tina Walsh
- Tom Wright as Detective Pascal
- Steele Stebbins as Jake
- Andrew Fiscella as Cop in Attic

== Reception ==
Reagan Gavin Rasquinha of The Times of India rated the film 3.5 stars out of 5 and praised the "tight" cinematography, the "subtle" special effects, the "tense" atmosphere and the "effective" sound effects.

Kevan Farrow of Scream wrote that the film "manages to make something just about worthwhile out of a lazy, generic script and underwritten characters."

Damon Smith of The Irish News gave the film a score of 4/10 and wrote that it "lacks scares, suspense or ingenuity."
