= Steele Stebbins =

American actor

- Occupations: Actor, EMT
- Years active: 2010–present

Steele Stebbins is an American actor. He is best known for his performance as Kevin Griswold, in the 2015 comedy film Vacation and as Wyatt, in the 2014 comedy film A Haunted House 2. In addition, he has appeared in two short films, Wish You Were (Here) in 2010 and Metered in 2011.

He also played a recurring character on Crazy Ex-Girlfriend as the youngest son of Paula Proctor, Tommy Proctor. He also appeared in Shane Dawson’s 2012 music video, The Vacation Song.

As of 2024, Stebbins also worked as an Emergency Medical Technician.

== Filmography ==
=== Film ===
Year	Film	Role	Producer
2010	Wish You Were (Here)	Ryan	Dir: Alexander Thomas Scott
2011	Metered	Jeremy	Dir: Jeff Bourg
2014	A Haunted House 2	Wyatt	IM Global Octane; Dir: Michael Tiddes
2015	Vacation	Kevin	Warner Bros. Dir: Jonathan Goldstein; Dir: John Francis Daley
2016	Within	Jake	New Line Cinema; Dir: Phil Claydon
2017	Brotherly Love	Kyle	Dir: Barry Battles
2021	Donny's Bar Mitzvah	Donny	Dir: Jonny Comebacks

=== Television ===
Year	Title	Role	Producer	Notes
2015–19	Crazy Ex-Girlfriend	Tommy Proctor	The CW	
2016	Winning Ugly - Pilot	Harry	Fox	
2016	Heartbeat	Carson	NBCUniversal	
2016–17	Gamer's Guide to Pretty Much Everything	Spencer	Disney	
2017	Right Hand Guy	Jeff	Disney	
2018	LA to Vegas	Tanner	Fox	Episode: "Jack Silver"

=== Commercial ===
Title	Role	Producer
Chamberlain	Boy	Humble
McDonald's	Boy	Hello!
Duracell	Boy	Tool of North America
Bright House Networks	JJ	BHN Prods
PetSmart	Boy	Cameo Content
Matchbox Toys	Boy	Mattel
AT & T	Boy	Elyse Hollander
Fema Ventura County	Boy	Jonah Ansell
2017 Nissan Midnight Edition	Skateboarder	

== Philanthropy ==
In 2016, Stebbins established a non-profit organization, Steele Stebbins Philanthropies, that is dedicated to engaging youth in philanthropy.

== Awards ==
Won the Young Artist Awards 2016 leading actor award in a feature film (aged 11–13) for his role of Kevin Griswold in the feature film Vacation.
