= Chevy Chase =

American comedian, writer and actor (born 1943)

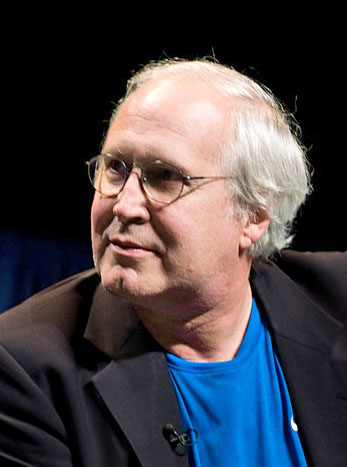
- Chase in 2010
- Born: Cornelius Crane Chase; October 8, 1943 (age 83); New York City, U.S.
- Education: Bard College (BA)
- Occupations: Comedian; actor; writer
- Political party: Democratic
- Spouses: Suzanne Hewitt (m. 1973; div. 1976); Jacqueline Carlin (m. 1976; div. 1980); Jayni Luke (m. 1982)
- Children: 3
- Relatives: Miles Browning (maternal grandfather); Frank Swift Chase (granduncle); Cornelius Vanderbilt Crane (adoptive maternal grandfather); Edward Leigh Chase (paternal grandfather)

Comedy career
- Years active: 1967–present
- Medium: Stand-up; film; television
- Genres: Sketch comedy; improvisational comedy; physical comedy; slapstick

Cornelius Crane "Chevy" Chase (/ˈtʃɛvi/; born October 8, 1943) is an American comedian, actor, and writer. He became the breakout cast member in the first season of Saturday Night Live (1975–1976), where his recurring Weekend Update segment became a staple of the show. As both a performer and a writer on the series, he earned two Primetime Emmy Awards out of four nominations.

After leaving Saturday Night Live early in its second season, Chase established himself as a leading man, starring in some of the most successful comedy films of the 1980s, starting with his Golden Globe-nominated role in the romantic comedy Foul Play (1978). Most famously in the 1980s, he portrayed Ty Webb in Caddyshack (1980), Clark Griswold in five National Lampoon's Vacation films from 1983 to 2015, and Irwin "Fletch" Fletcher in Fletch (1985) and Fletch Lives (1989). He also starred in Seems Like Old Times (1980), Spies Like Us (1985), ¡Three Amigos! (1986), and Funny Farm (1988). He hosted the Academy Awards twice (1987 and 1988). After a string of flops in the 1990s, Chase's career dwindled until he had a popularity resurgence with his role as Pierce Hawthorne on the NBC sitcom Community (2009–2014).

== Early life and education ==
=== Family ===
Cornelius Crane Chase was born in Lower Manhattan on October 8, 1943, and grew up in Woodstock, New York. He has an older brother, Ned Jr.

His father, Edward Tinsley "Ned" Chase (1919–2005), was a book editor and magazine writer. Chase's paternal grandfather was artist and illustrator Edward Leigh Chase, and his granduncle was painter and teacher Frank Swift Chase. His mother, Cathalene Parker (née Browning; 1923–2005), was a concert pianist and librettist. Cathalene was adopted as a child by her stepfather, Cornelius Vanderbilt Crane, heir to The Crane Company, and took the name Cathalene Crane. Her mother, also named Cathalene, was an opera singer who performed several times at Carnegie Hall. Chase's maternal grandfather was Rear Admiral Miles Browning, who served on the aircraft carrier USS Enterprise at the Battle of Midway in World War II.

Chase was named for his adoptive grandfather, Cornelius, while the nickname "Chevy" was bestowed by his grandmother from the English ballad "The Ballad of Chevy Chase". As a descendant of the Scottish Clan Douglas, she thought the name appropriate. Cornelius Vanderbilt Crane disinherited Chevy Chase's mother, Cathalene Parker Browning Crane, around 1940, approximately three years before Chevy was born on October 8, 1943.

=== Early life, family and education ===
Chase's parents divorced when he was four; his father remarried into the Folgers coffee family, and his mother remarried twice. He has stated that he grew up in an upper middle class environment and that his adoptive maternal grandfather did not bequeath any assets to Chase's mother when he died. In a 2007 biography, Chase stated that he was physically and psychologically abused as a child by his mother and stepfather, Dr. John Cederquist, a psychoanalyst. In that biography, he said, "I lived in fear all the time, deathly fear." Abuse he was subjected to as a child included being awakened in the middle of the night by his mother to be slapped repeatedly across the face, lashes to the backs of his legs, punches to the head by his stepfather, and being locked in a bedroom closet for hours. As a punishment for being suspended from school at the age of 14, Chase was locked in a basement for several days. Both of his parents died in 2005.

Chase was educated at Riverdale Country School, an independent day school in the Riverdale neighborhood of The Bronx, New York City, before being expelled. He ultimately graduated as valedictorian in 1962 from the Stockbridge School, an independent boarding school near the Interlaken section of Stockbridge, Massachusetts. At Stockbridge, he was known as a practical joker with an occasional mean streak. He attended Haverford College during the 1962–1963 term, where he was noted for slapstick comedy and an absurd sense of physical humor, including his signature pratfalls and "sticking forks into his orifices". During a 2009 interview on the Today show, he ostensibly verified the oft-publicized urban legend that he was expelled for harboring a cow in his fourth floor room, although his former roommate David Felsen asserted in a 2003 interview that Chase left for academic reasons. Chase transferred to Bard College in Annandale-on-Hudson, New York, where he studied a pre-med curriculum and graduated in 1967 with a Bachelor of Arts in English. While at Bard, Chase played drums in a band called The Leather Canary. The other two members, Walter Becker and Donald Fagen, went on to found Steely Dan. Additionally, he played drums and keyboards for a band, Chamaeleon Church. They recorded one album for MGM Records before disbanding.

Chase did not enter medical school, which meant he was subject to the military draft. Chase was not drafted, and when he appeared in January 1989 as the first guest of the just-launched late-night The Pat Sajak Show, he said he had tricked his draft board into believing he deserved a 4-F classification by falsely claiming that he had "homosexual tendencies".

== Career ==
=== 1967–1974: Early career ===
Chase was a member of an early underground comedy ensemble called Channel One, which he co-founded in 1967. He also wrote a one-page spoof of Mission: Impossible for Mad magazine in 1970 and was a writer for the short-lived Smothers Brothers TV show comeback in the spring of 1975. Chase made the move to comedy as a full-time career by 1973, when he became a writer and cast member of The National Lampoon Radio Hour, a syndicated satirical radio series. The National Lampoon Radio Hour also featured John Belushi, Gilda Radner, Bill Murray, and Brian Doyle-Murray, all of whom later became the "Not-Ready-For-Prime Time Players" on NBC Saturday Night (later re-titled NBC's Saturday Night and finally Saturday Night Live). Chase and Belushi also appeared in National Lampoon's off-Broadway revue Lemmings, a sketch and musical send-up of popular youth culture, in which Chase also played the drums and piano during the musical numbers. He appeared in the movie The Groove Tube (1974), which was directed by another co-founder of Channel One, Ken Shapiro, featuring several Channel One sketches.

=== 1975–1976: Saturday Night Live ===
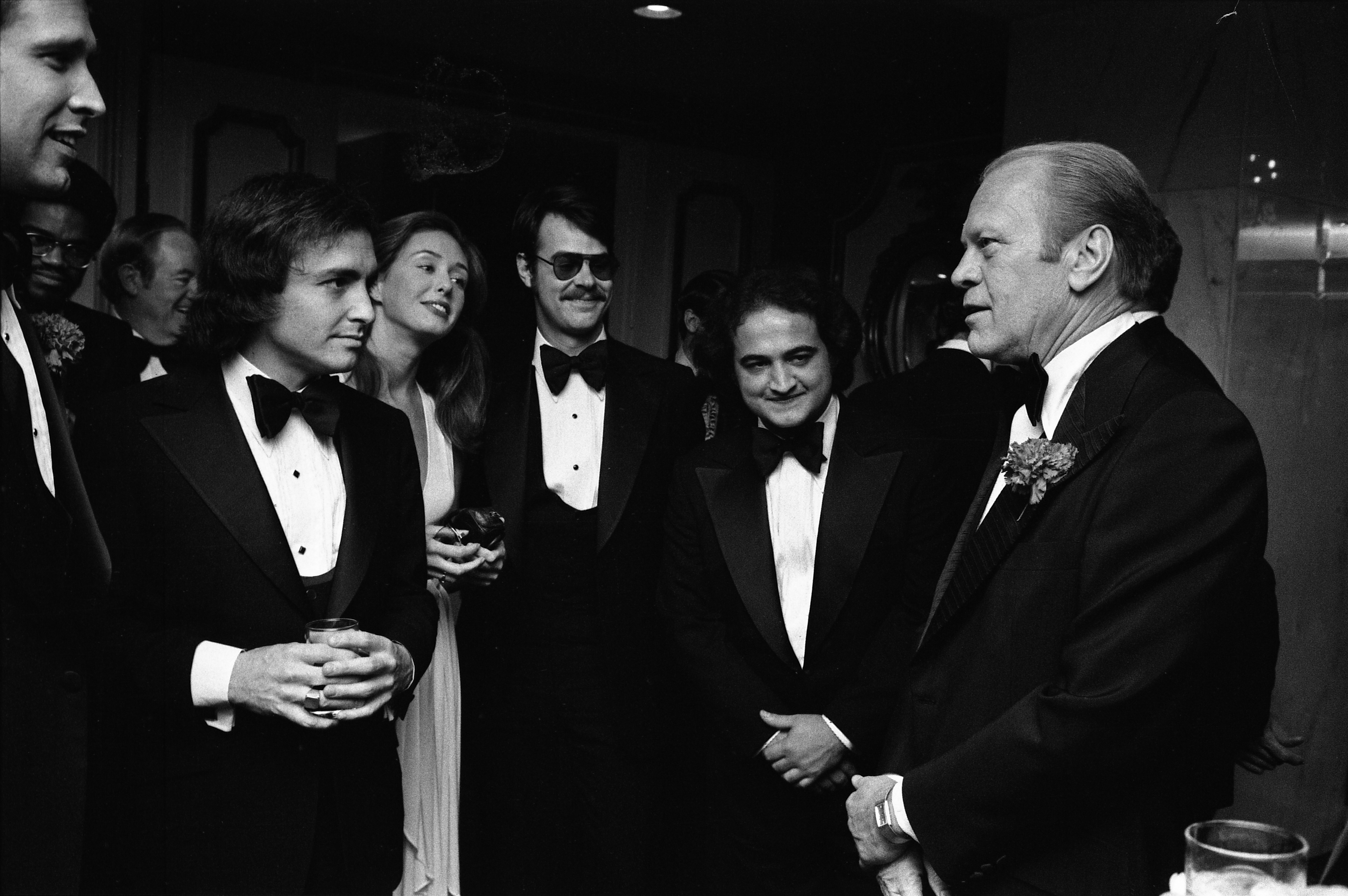
The original cast of Saturday Night Live with President Gerald Ford in 1976; Chase is on the far left

Chase was one of the original cast members of Saturday Night Live (SNL), NBC's late-night comedy television show, beginning in October 1975. During the first season, he introduced every show except two, with "Live from New York, it's Saturday Night!" The remark was often preceded by a pratfall, known as "The Fall of the Week". Chase became known for his skill at physical comedy. In one comedy sketch, he mimicked a real-life incident in which President Gerald Ford accidentally tripped while disembarking from Air Force One in Salzburg, Austria. This portrayal of President Ford as a bumbling klutz became a favorite device of Chase's, and helped form the popular concept of Ford as being a clumsy man despite Ford having been a "star athlete" during his university years. In later years, Chase met and became friendly with President Ford.

Chase was the original anchor for the Weekend Update segment of SNL, and his catchphrase introduction, "I'm Chevy Chase… and you're not," became well known. His trademark conclusion, "Good night, and have a pleasant tomorrow," was later resurrected by Jane Curtin and Tina Fey. Chase also wrote comedy material for Weekend Update. For example, he wrote and performed "The News for the Hard of Hearing". In this skit, Chase read the top story of the day, aided by Garrett Morris, who repeated the story by loudly shouting it. Chase claimed that his version of Weekend Update was the inspiration for later news satire shows such as The Daily Show and The Colbert Report. Weekend Update was later revived as a segment on The Chevy Chase Show, a short-lived late-night talk show produced by Chase and broadcast by Fox Broadcasting Company.

Chase was committed contractually to SNL for only one year as a writer and became a cast member during rehearsals just before the show's premiere. He received two Emmy Awards and a Golden Globe Award for his comedy writing and live comic acting on the show. In Rolling Stone's February 2015 appraisal of all 141 SNL cast members to date, Chase was ranked tenth in overall importance. "Strange as it sounds, Chase might be the most under-rated SNL player," they wrote. "It took him only one season to define the franchise…without that deadpan arrogance, the whole SNL style of humor would fall flat."

In a 1975 New York magazine cover story, which called him "The funniest man in America", NBC executives referred to Chase as "The first real potential successor to Johnny Carson" and claimed he would begin guest-hosting The Tonight Show Starring Johnny Carson within six months of the article. Chase dismissed rumors that he could be the next Carson by telling New York, "I'd never be tied down for five years interviewing TV personalities." Chase did not appear on the program until May 4, 1977, when he was promoting a prime-time special for NBC. Carson (who was never a fan of SNL) later said of Chase: "He couldn't ad-lib a fart after a baked-bean dinner."

Chase acknowledged Ernie Kovacs's influence on his work in Saturday Night Live, and he thanked Kovacs during his acceptance speech for his Emmy Award. In addition, Chase spoke of Kovacs's influence on his work in an appearance in the 1982 documentary called Ernie Kovacs: Television's Original Genius.

=== 1976–1989: Film stardom and acclaim ===
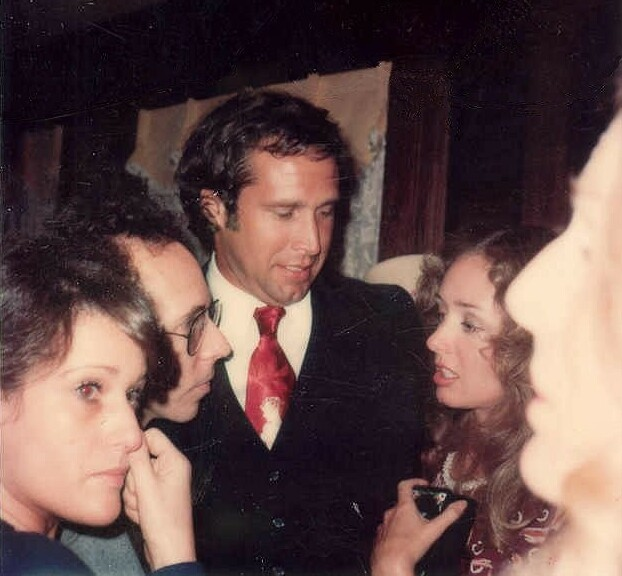
Chevy Chase at the private party after the premiere of the movie A Star Is Born, December 1976

In late 1976, in the middle of SNL's second season, Chase became the second member of the original cast to leave the show (after George Coe during the first season). While he landed starring roles in several films on the strength of his SNL fame, he asserted that the principal reason for his departure was the reluctance of his girlfriend, Jacqueline Carlin, to move to New York. Chase moved to Los Angeles, married Carlin, and was replaced by Bill Murray, although he made a few cameo appearances on the show during the second season.

Chase hosted SNL eight times from 1978 to 1997. It was reported that SNL creator and show-runner Lorne Michaels had been shocked by Chase's behavior during his 1997 appearance as a host and had banned him as a result, reports which Michaels later disputed, calling the claims "idiotic". While Chase has not returned to SNL to host since 1997, he appeared on the show's 25th anniversary special in 1999 and was interviewed for a 2005 NBC special on the first five years of SNL. Later appearances included a Caddyshack skit featuring Bill Murray, a 1997 episode with guest host Chris Farley, as the Land Shark in a Weekend Update segment in 2001, another Weekend Update segment in 2007, and in Justin Timberlake's monologue in 2013 as a member of the Five-Timers Club, where he was reunited with his Three Amigos co-stars Steve Martin and Martin Short. He also participated in the 40th anniversary special in February 2015.

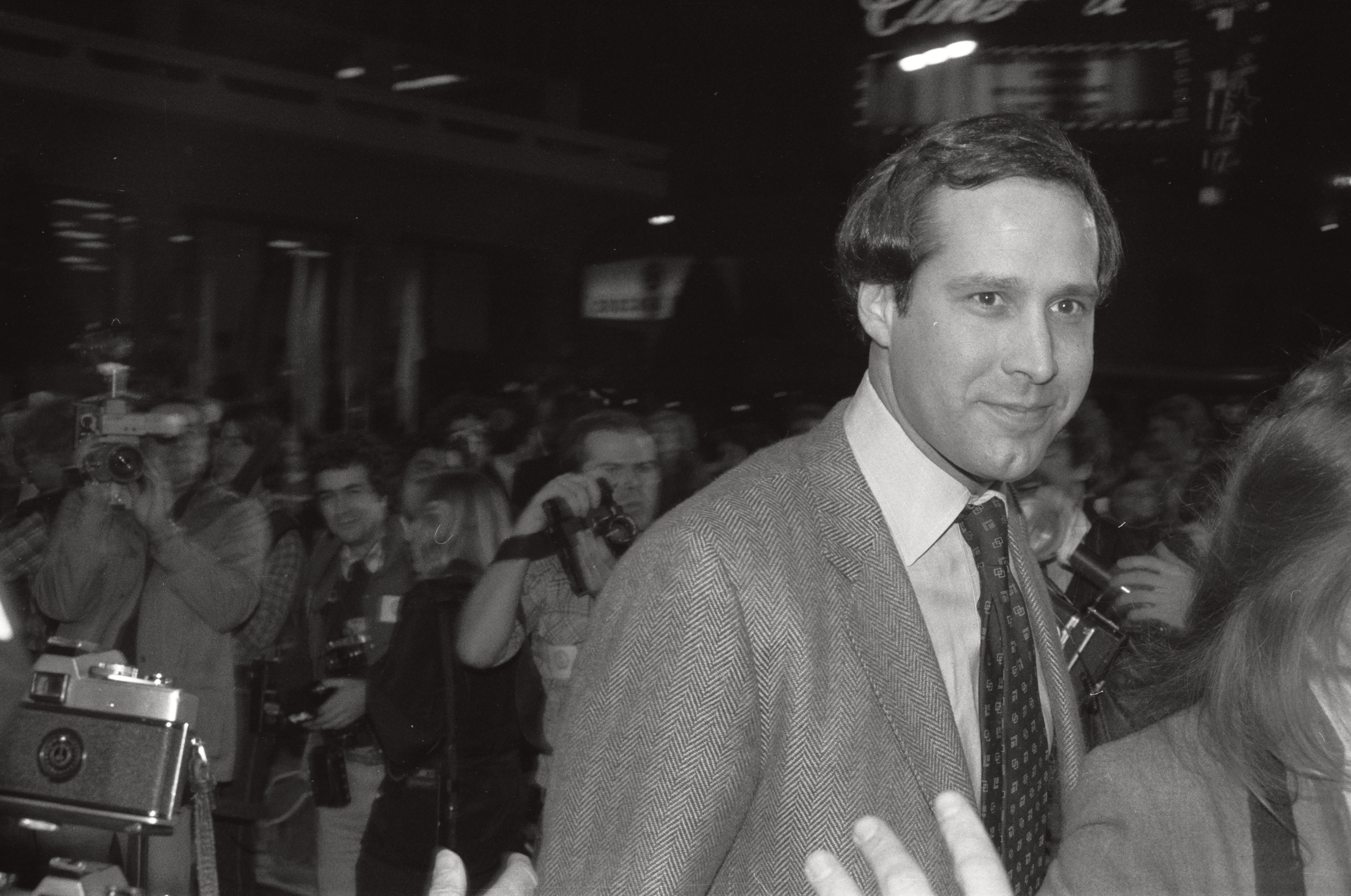
Chevy Chase at the premiere of the movie Seems Like Old Times, December 10, 1980

Chase's early film roles included Tunnel Vision (1976); Foul Play (1978, a box-office hit that made more than $44 million and earned Chase a Golden Globe nomination); and Oh! Heavenly Dog (1980). The role of Eric "Otter" Stratton in National Lampoon's Animal House was written with Chase in mind, but he turned the role down to work on Foul Play. The role went to Tim Matheson instead. Chase said in an interview that he chose to do Foul Play so he could do "real acting" for the first time in his career instead of just "schtick".

Chase followed Foul Play in 1980 by portraying Ty Webb in the Harold Ramis comedy Caddyshack, a box office success that earned mixed reviews from contemporary critics but pulled in $39 million from a $6 million budget. That same year, he reunited with Foul Play co-star Goldie Hawn for Neil Simon's Seems Like Old Times, a box-office success that earned more than $43 million. He then released a self-titled record album, co-produced by Chase and Tom Scott, with novelty and cover versions of songs by Randy Newman, Barry White, Bob Marley, the Beatles, Donna Summer, Tennessee Ernie Ford, The Troggs, and The Sugarhill Gang.

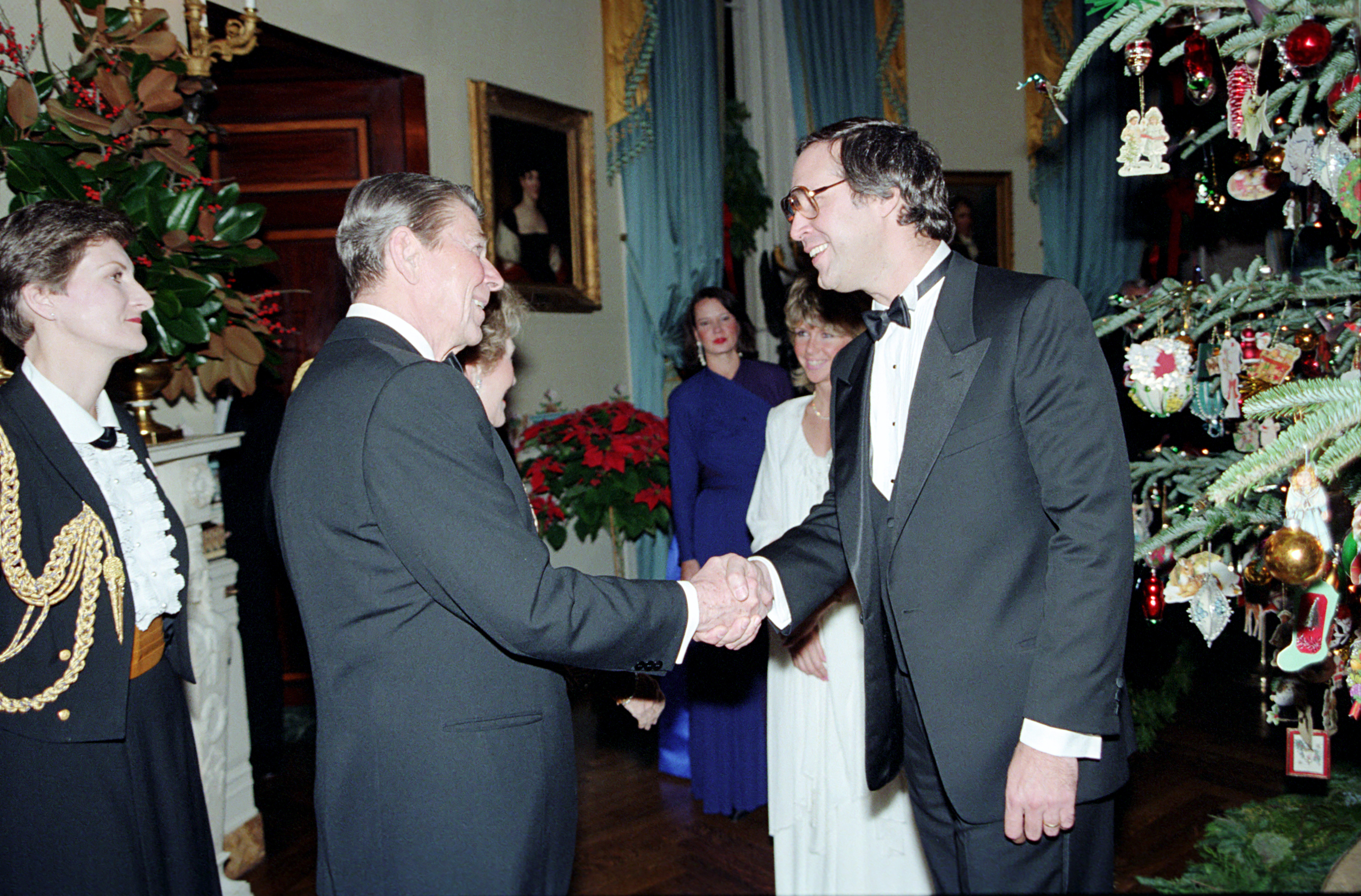
Ronald Reagan and Chevy Chase, 1985

Chase narrowly escaped death by electrocution during the filming of Modern Problems in 1980. During a sequence in which Chase's character wears "landing lights" as he dreams that he is an airplane, the lights malfunctioned, and an electric current passed through Chase's arm, back, and neck muscles. The near-death experience followed the end of his marriage to Carlin, and Chase experienced a period of deep depression. He married Jayni Luke in 1982. Chase continued his film career by playing Clark Griswold in 1983's National Lampoon's Vacation. Directed by Ramis and written by John Hughes, the movie grossed $61 million on a $15 million budget—his most successful movie at the time.

In 1985, Chase played Irwin "Fletch" Fletcher in Fletch, based on Gregory Mcdonald's Fletch books, which grossed more than $50 million off an $8 million budget. That same year, he appeared in a sequel to Vacation, National Lampoon's European Vacation, which pulled in just shy of $50 million at the box office, and co-starred with fellow SNL alum Dan Aykroyd in Spies Like Us, which made $60 million. In 1986, Chase joined SNL veterans Steve Martin and Martin Short in the Lorne Michaels–produced comedy ¡Three Amigos! that made nearly $40 million, with Chase declaring in an interview that making Three Amigos was the most fun he had making a film. He also appeared alongside Paul Simon, one of his best friends, in Simon's 1986 second video for "You Can Call Me Al", in which he lip-syncs all of Simon's lyrics.

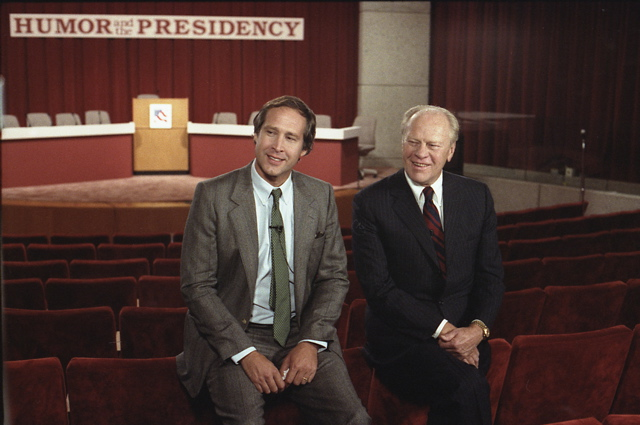
Gerald Ford with Chase before the Conference on Humor and the Presidency held at the Gerald R. Ford Museum in 1986

In 1987, his Cornelius Productions company signed a non-exclusive, first-refusal deal to develop four feature projects at the Warner Bros. studio, and set up a fifth project at Universal Pictures. Chase hosted the Academy Awards in 1987 and 1988, opening the telecast in 1988 with the quip, "Good evening, Hollywood phonies!" In 1988, he starred alongside Madolyn Smith in Funny Farm, a sizeable hit at $25 million that reached 64% approval rate on Rotten Tomatoes. That same year, he appeared (albeit via a glorified cameo) in a sequel to Caddyshack, Caddyshack II, which made less than $12 million, becoming one of his few flops at the time.

In 1989, Chase starred in a sequel to Fletch, Fletch Lives, which went on to gross more than $35 million, and made a third Vacation film, National Lampoon's Christmas Vacation, which pulled in $71 million and, thanks to its holiday theme, has become one of his more durable films. At the height of his career in the late 1980s, Chase earned around US$7 million per film and was a highly visible celebrity.

=== 1990–2009: Career fluctuations ===
Chase played saxophone onstage at Simon's free concert at the Great Lawn in Central Park in the summer of 1991. Later in 1991, he helped record and appeared in the music video "Voices That Care" to entertain and support U.S. troops involved in Operation Desert Storm, and supported the International Red Cross. Chase had three consecutive film flops: Razzie Award-nominated Nothing but Trouble (1991), Memoirs of an Invisible Man (1992), and Cops & Robbersons (1994). The three releases had a combined gross of $34 million in the United States.

In September 1993, Chase hosted The Chevy Chase Show, a weeknight talk show, for the Fox Broadcasting Company. Although it had high commercial expectations, the show was cancelled by Fox after five weeks. Chase later appeared in a commercial for Doritos, airing during the Super Bowl, in which he made a humorous reference to the show's failure.

Chase found more success with some of his subsequent movies. Man of the House (1995), co-starring Farrah Fawcett, was relatively successful, grossing $40 million, as was Vegas Vacation (1997, his fourth Vacation film) grossing $36.4 million. Snow Day (2000), in which Chase appeared, was also successful grossing over $60 million, as well as Orange County (2002), grossing more than $40 million. Chase was Hasty Pudding's 1993 Man of the Year, and received a star on the Hollywood Walk of Fame in that same year. He also received The Harvard Lampoon's Lifetime Achievement Award in 1996. In 1998, a Golden Palm Star on the Palm Springs, California, Walk of Stars was dedicated to him.

He was roasted by the New York Friars Club for a Comedy Central television special in 2002. This roast was noted for being unusually vitriolic, even by the standards of a roast. Some of the later films starring Chase (e.g., Vacuums, Rent-a-Husband, Goose!) were not widely released in the United States. He returned to mainstream movie-making in 2006, co-starring with Tim Allen and Courteney Cox in the comedy Zoom, though it was both a critical and commercial failure. Chase guest-starred as an anti-Semitic murder suspect in "In Vino Veritas", the November 3, 2006, episode of Law & Order. He also guest-starred in the ABC drama series Brothers & Sisters in two episodes as a former love interest of Sally Field's character. Chase appeared in a prominent recurring role as villainous software magnate Ted Roark on the NBC spy-comedy Chuck. In 2009, Chase and Dan Aykroyd voiced themselves in the Family Guy episode "Spies Reminiscent of Us".

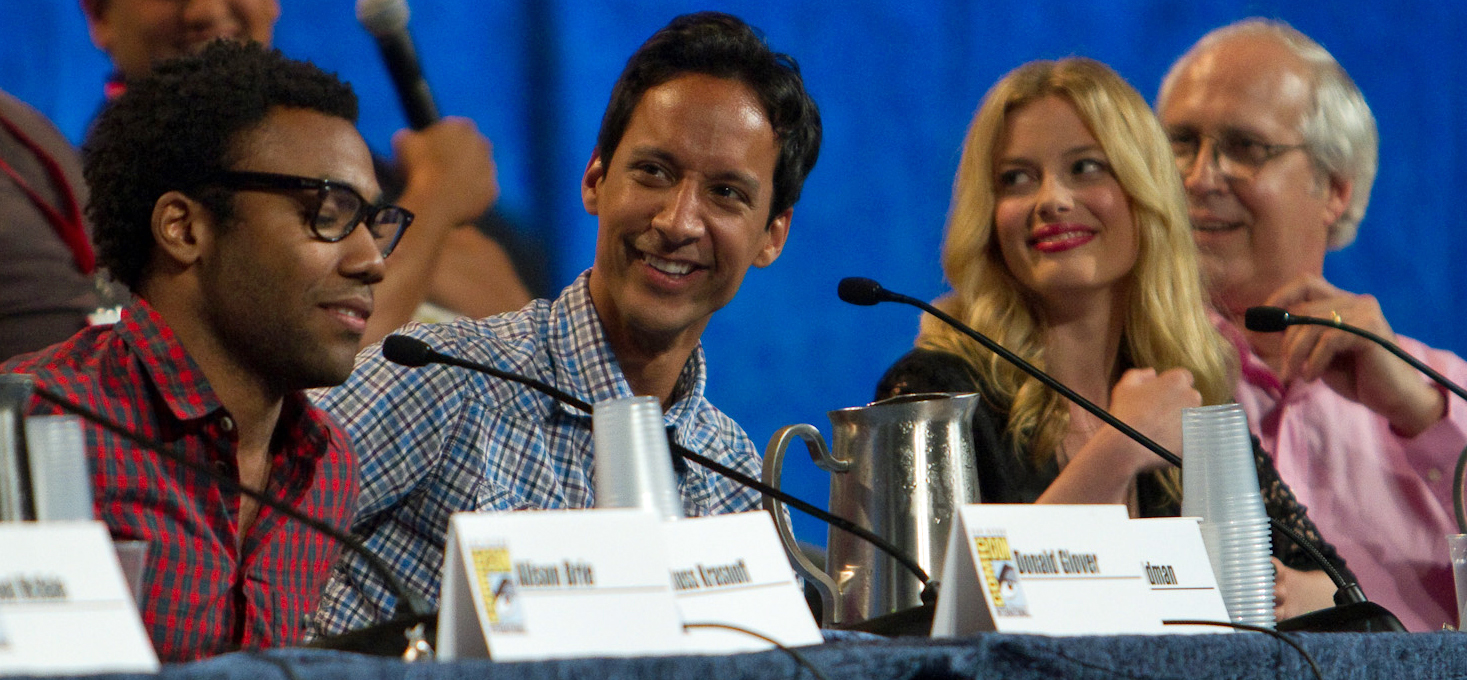
Donald Glover, Danny Pudi, Gillian Jacobs and Chase at San Diego Comic-Con in 2010

=== 2009–2014: Return to television ===
Starting in 2009, Chase returned to NBC in the sitcom Community, as aging moist-towelette tycoon Pierce Hawthorne. The show was created by Dan Harmon and starred Joel McHale, Alison Brie, Gillian Jacobs, Donald Glover, Danny Pudi, and Yvette Nicole Brown. The series received critical acclaim for its acting and writing, appeared on numerous critics' year-end "best-of" lists, and developed a cult following. The New York Times critic Alessandra Stanley praised the casting of Chase writing, "Jeff [Joel McHale's character in Community] has the kind of sardonic repartee and slapdash nonchalance that the comedian Chevy Chase had when he was the young star of the Fletch movies", while adding, "Even that is an inside casting joke: Mr. Chase, who is farcically loopy and delightful in the pilot."

In 2010, Chase appeared in an online Vacation short film Hotel Hell Vacation, featuring the Griswold parents, and in the Funny or Die original comedy sketch "Presidential Reunion", where he played President Ford alongside other current and former SNL president impersonators. That same year, Chase appeared in the film Hot Tub Time Machine which received some praise, followed by the sequel.

Throughout the filming of Community, Chase became increasingly uncomfortable with the direction of Pierce's character arc and had increasing disagreements with the show's creator Dan Harmon. In 2012, Chase had an outburst on set while complaining about his character's bigotry as written, yelling that if it continued, he might be asked to call either Donald Glover or Yvette Nicole Brown's character the N-word. He later apologized for the outburst. Soon after his apology, he left the show after a mutual agreement with the network. Remaining episodes of the fourth season of Community were written around Chase's departure. Chase later claimed that his exit was due to his personal opinions of the show rather than the outburst, claiming that it "wasn't funny enough". His departure subsequently was cemented by the writers, who killed off Pierce in the third episode of Community's fifth season.

=== 2015–present ===
In 2015, Chase reprised his role as Clark Griswold in the fifth Vacation installment, titled Vacation. Unlike the previous four films, in which Clark is the main protagonist, he has only a brief, though pivotal, appearance. In spite of largely negative critical reception, the film proved to be a financial success, grossing over $107 million worldwide.

In 2019, Chase appeared in the Netflix movie The Last Laugh, which starred Richard Dreyfuss. In 2024, he starred in the film The Christmas Letter with Randy Quaid and Brian Doyle-Murray.

In 2025, Chase was excluded from a role at the Saturday Night Live 50th Anniversary Special, leaving him melancholy. Chase said: "I expected that I would've been on the stage too with all the other actors. When Garrett [Morris] and Laraine [Newman] went on the stage there, I was curious as to why I didn't. No one asked me to. Why was I left aside?"

He was the subject of the 2026 CNN documentary, I'm Chevy Chase and You're Not.

== Personal life ==
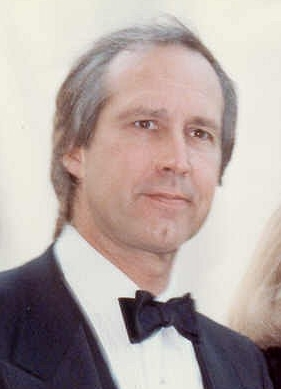
Chase in 1990

=== Marriage and family ===
Chase married Susan Hewitt in New York City on February 23, 1973. They divorced on February 1, 1976.

His second marriage, to Jacqueline Carlin, was formalized on December 4, 1976, and ended in divorce on November 14, 1980; they had no children.

He married his third wife, Jayni Luke, in Pacific Palisades on June 19, 1982. They have three daughters. The couple reside in Bedford, New York.

Chase resided in Pacific Palisades, Los Angeles from 1980 until 1995 in a Tudor-style home. He was the Honorary Mayor of Pacific Palisades between 1986 and 1988.

=== Substance abuse ===
In 1986, Chase was admitted to the Betty Ford Center for treatment of a prescription painkiller addiction. His use began after he experienced ongoing back pain related to the pratfalls he took during his Saturday Night Live appearances. In 2010, he said that his drug abuse had been "low level".

He entered the Hazelden Clinic in September 2016 to receive treatment for alcoholism.

=== Political views ===
An active environmentalist and philanthropist, Chase is a political liberal. He campaigned for Democratic presidential nominees Bill Clinton in the 1990s, and John Kerry in 2004.

In 2004, during a speech at a People for the American Way benefit at the John F. Kennedy Center for the Performing Arts he mocked Republican president George W. Bush, Kerry's opponent in the 2004 election, referring to Bush as an "uneducated, real lying schmuck" and a "dumb fuck". His comments upset both the organizers and the crowd.

He endorsed Hillary Clinton's 2008 presidential campaign.

=== Fight with Bill Murray ===
Before performing a third-season episode of Saturday Night Live in 1978, Chase got into a fistfight with Bill Murray in John Belushi's dressing room. It occurred when Chase returned to host the show after his exit as a full-time cast member in 1976. Murray had reportedly made a derogatory comment about Chase's troubled marriage to Jacqueline Carlin, leading Chase to criticize Murray's physical appearance. The fight was reportedly witnessed by musician Billy Joel, and by cast members Jane Curtin, Laraine Newman, and Gilda Radner. In a talk show appearance in 2021, Newman said of the altercation, "It was very sad and painful and awful." She added, "I think they both knew the one thing that they could say to one another that would hurt the most and that's what I think incited it." Chase and Murray later reconciled with the help of Harold Ramis and starred in Caddyshack in 1980.

=== Health ===
Chase had a near-death experience while working on the set of Modern Problems in 1981. An electrical current went through Chase's arms, back, and neck muscles when the lights short-circuited while filming a scene.

In 2021, Chase was put into a medically induced coma for eight days following heart failure. He spent five weeks in the hospital. At the time, it was announced as "undisclosed issues with his heart". Chase has said that the coma has led to memory loss.

== Filmography ==
=== Film ===
Year	Title	Role	Notes
1968	Walk... Don't Walk	Pedestrian	Short film
1974	The Groove Tube	The Fingers/Geritan/Four Leaf Clover	
1976	Tunnel Vision	Himself	
1978	Foul Play	Tony Carlson	
1980	Oh! Heavenly Dog	Browning	
1980	Caddyshack	Ty Webb	
1980	Seems Like Old Times	Nicholas Gardenia	
1981	Under the Rainbow	Bruce Thorpe	
1981	Modern Problems	Max Fiedler	
1983	National Lampoon's Vacation	Clark Griswold	
1983	Deal of the Century	Eddie Muntz	
1985	Fletch	Irwin 'Fletch' Fletcher	
1985	National Lampoon's European Vacation	Clark Griswold	
1985	Sesame Street Presents: Follow That Bird	Newscaster	Cameo
1985	Spies Like Us	Emmett Fitz-Hume	
1986	¡Three Amigos!	Dusty Bottoms	
1988	The Couch Trip	Condom Father	Cameo
1988	Funny Farm	Andy Farmer	
1988	Caddyshack II	Ty Webb	
1989	Fletch Lives	Irwin 'Fletch' Fletcher	
1989	National Lampoon's Christmas Vacation	Clark Griswold	
1991	Nothing but Trouble	Chris Thorne	
1991	L.A. Story	Carlo Christopher	Cameo
1992	Memoirs of an Invisible Man	Nick Halloway	
1992	Hero	Deke	Uncredited
1993	Last Action Hero	Himself	Cameo
1994	A Century of Cinema	Himself	Documentary
1994	Cops & Robbersons	Norman Robberson	
1995	Man of the House	Jack Sturgess	
1997	Vegas Vacation	Clark Griswold	
1998	Dirty Work	Dr. Farthing	
2000	Snow Day	Tom Brandston	
2000	Pete's Pizza	Narrator	Voice; Short film
2000	The One Armed Bandit	Cop	Short film
2002	Orange County	Principal Harbert	
2003	Vacuums	Mr. Punch	
2003	Bitter Jester	Himself	Documentary
2004	Our Italian Husband	Paul Parmesan	
2004	Bad Meat	Congressman Bernard P. Greely	Direct-to-DVD
2005	Ellie Parker	Dennis Swartzbaum	
2006	Funny Money	Henry Perkins	
2006	Doogal	Train	Voice
2006	Goose on the Loose	Congreve Maddox	Direct-to-DVD
2006	Zoom	Dr. Grant	
2007	Cutlass	Stan	Short film
2009	Stay Cool	Principal Marshall	
2009	Jack and the Beanstalk	Antipode	
2010	Hot Tub Time Machine	Repairman	
2010	Hotel Hell Vacation	Clark Griswold	Short film
2011	Not Another Not Another Movie	Max Storm	
2013	Before I Sleep	Gravedigger	
2014	Lovesick	Lester	
2014	Shelby	Grandpa Geoffrey	Direct-to-DVD
2015	Drunk Stoned Brilliant Dead	Himself	Documentary
2015	Hot Tub Time Machine 2	Repairman	
2015	Vacation	Clark Griswold	
2017	The Last Movie Star	Sonny	
2017	Hedgehogs	ThinkMan	Voice; Direct-to-DVD
2018	Love, Gilda	Himself	Documentary
2019	The Last Laugh	Al Hart	
2020	The Very Excellent Mr. Dundee	Chevy	
2021	Panda vs. Aliens	King Karoth	Voice; Direct-to-DVD
2023	Zombie Town	Mezmarian	
2023	Glisten and the Merry Mission	Santa Claus	Voice
2024	The Christmas Letter	Norm De Plume	
2026	I'm Chevy Chase and You're Not	Himself	Documentary
2026	Lorne	Himself	Documentary

=== Television ===
Year	Title	Role	Notes
1975	The Smothers Brothers Show		Writer
1975–2025	Saturday Night Live	Various characters/Himself (host)	30 episodes (as cast member), 8 episodes (as host); also writer
1977	The Chevy Chase Show	Himself	Television special; also writer
1977	The Paul Simon Special	Himself	Television special; also writer
1979	The Chevy Chase National Humor Test	Himself	Television special; also writer
1987	59th Academy Awards	Himself (co-host)	Television special
1988	60th Academy Awards	Himself (host)	Television special
1988	Untitled Dan Aykroyd Project	Adin A. Oss	Pilot
1990	The Earth Day Special	Vic's Buddy	Television special
1993	The Chevy Chase Show	Himself (host)	25 episodes; also writer and producer
1995	The Larry Sanders Show	Himself	Episode: "Roseanne's Return"
1997	The Nanny	Himself	Episode: "A Decent Proposal"
2002	America's Most Terrible Things	Andy Potts	Pilot
2003	Freedom: A History of US	Various voices	5 episodes
2004	The Karate Dog	Cho-Cho	Voice; Television film
2006	The Secret Policeman's Ball	General Nuisance	Television special
2006	Law & Order	Mitch Carroll	Episode: "In Vino Veritas"
2007, 2009	Family Guy	Clark Griswold/Himself (voices)	Episodes: "Blue Harvest" & "Spies Reminiscent of Us"
2007	Brothers & Sisters	Stan Harris	2 episodes
2009	Hjälp!	Dan Carter	8 episodes
2009	Chuck	Ted Roark	3 episodes
2009–2014	Community	Pierce Hawthorne	83 episodes
2011	Method to the Madness of Jerry Lewis	Himself	Television documentary
2014	Hot in Cleveland	Ross	Episode: "People Feeding People"
2014	Wishin' and Hopin'	Adult Felix (voice)	Television film
2015	Chevy	Chase	Pilot
2016	A Christmas in Vermont	Preston Bullock	Television film

== Awards and nominations ==
In 1976, he was nominated for a Writers Guild of America Awards for "Writing for a Variety Series" as part of The Smothers Brothers Show's writers room. Also in 1976 he was nominated at the Primetime Emmy Awards for his work on the first season of Saturday Night Live. He won both nominations.

On September 23, 1993, Chase received a star on the Hollywood Walk of Fame at 7021 Hollywood Boulevard.

Award	Year (Note: Year refers to when the ceremony took place.)	Category	Title	Result	Ref.
Writers Guild of America Awards	1976	Writing for a Variety Series	The Smothers Brothers Show	Nominated	
Primetime Emmy Awards	1976	Individual Performance in a Variety Program	Saturday Night Live	Won	
Primetime Emmy Awards	1976	Outstanding Writing for a Variety Series	Saturday Night Live	Won	
Primetime Emmy Awards	1977	Individual Performance in a Variety Program	Saturday Night Live	Nominated	
Primetime Emmy Awards	1977	Outstanding Writing for a Variety Series	Saturday Night Live	Nominated	
Primetime Emmy Awards	1978	Outstanding Writing for a Variety Special	The Paul Simon Special	Won	
Golden Globe Awards	1978	Best Actor – Motion Picture Musical or Comedy	Foul Play	Nominated	
Golden Globe Awards	1978	New Star of the Year	—N/a	Nominated	
Saturn Awards	1992	Best Actor	Memoirs of an Invisible Man	Nominated	

== Notes ==
Media offices
Preceded by First	Weekend Update anchor October 11, 1975 - October 30, 1976	Succeeded by Jane Curtin
