= Nick Marck =

American television director

- Born: United States
- Occupation(s): Film director, television director
- Years active: 1978–2010

Nick Marck is an American television director.

He has worked on a number of episodes from the television series Veronica Mars, Northern Exposure, Buffy the Vampire Slayer and The Wonder Years. Some of his other directing credits include Monk, Gilmore Girls, Malcolm in the Middle, Dawson's Creek, The X-Files, Charmed and Mr. and Mrs. Smith.

Marck has also directed two films, The Jungle Book: Mowgli's Story (1998) and National Lampoon's Christmas Vacation 2: Cousin Eddie's Island Adventure (2003).
