= Shae D'lyn =

American actress (born 1963)

Shae D'lyn (born Shae D'lyn Sherertz; November 24, 1963, Abilene, Texas) is an American actress. She is best known for her roles as series regular Jane Deaux/Cavanaugh on the sitcom Dharma & Greg, as Cousin Vicki in the feature film Vegas Vacation, and a recurring role as Carolyn Rothstein on Boardwalk Empire.

== Life and career ==
After graduating with honors from the University of Virginia, D'Lyn worked as an investment analyst for Morrow & Co. on Wall Street. After a year in New York, she moved to Boston as vice president of real estate investment banking for Boston Capital Partners where she syndicated low-income housing to investors seeking tax credits. Bored with financial services, she applied for, and was accepted to acting school.

Upon graduation, D'lyn immediately made appearances on television and in film. Her first appearance was in a 1993 episode of Quantum Leap, soon followed by the 1993 TNT television film of Arthur Miller's The American Clock. Her television work, aside from Dharma & Greg (1997–2001), included guest-starring appearances in Ellen, Law & Order and the role of Carolyn Rothstein on Boardwalk Empire in 2014. She starred in the off-Broadway premiere of Tennessee Williams' Baby Doll.

D'lyn directs theater, film, and television productions, and has founded a production company based in Los Angeles and Puerto Rico and an artists' cooperative in Los Angeles, New York, Vancouver, and Toronto with over 400 members. D'lyn produced and directed two documentary shorts released in 2006, of which Morir Para Ser Libre was featured at that year's Boston Latino Film Festival.

As of 2009, D'lyn had created the HearME project, which put interconnected music studios in orphanages worldwide; as of 2022 the website for HearME no longer exists.

== Selected filmography ==
Year	Film	Role
1993	The American Clock	Young Doris
1994	Hits!	Doozie
1997	Convict 762	Sheridan
1997	Vegas Vacation	Cousin Vicki
2006	Happily N'Ever After	Additional Voices
2011	The Motel Life	Claire
2012	The Pretty One	May
2016	Café Society	Carlotta
2018	Can You Ever Forgive Me?	Nell

== Television Roles ==
Year	TV Series	Role	Notes
1993	Quantum Leap	Lady Alexandra Corrington	Guest star, episode "Blood Moon"
1993	Ghost Mom	Jean	TV movie
1994	Law & Order	Dory	Guest Starred 1 episode
1995	Awake to Danger	Lorette McAdams	TV movie
1995	Secrets	Edwina Phelan	TV movie
1996	Ellen	Debbie Johnson	Guest Starred 1 episode
1997	Dharma & Greg	Jane Cavanaugh	Main Character: 92 episodes
2001	That '70s Show	Rudolph	Guest Starred 1 episode
2008	Speedie Date	Lisa	
2013	Alpha House	April Mandela	Guest star Season 1, episode 11
2014	Boardwalk Empire	Carolyn Rothstein	Guest star Season 5, episode 503, 505
2017	Orange Is the New Black	Tattoo Artist	Guest star Season 5, episode 12
