= National Lampoon's European Vacation =

1985 film by Amy Heckerling

- Theatrical release poster by Boris Vallejo
- Directed by: Amy Heckerling
- Screenplay by: John Hughes; Robert Klane
- Story by: John Hughes
- Based on: Characters by John Hughes
- Produced by: Matty Simmons
- Starring: Chevy Chase; Beverly D'Angelo; Dana Hill; Jason Lively; Victor Lanoux; Eric Idle
- Cinematography: Robert Paynter
- Edited by: Pembroke J. Herring
- Music by: Charles Fox
- Distributed by: Warner Bros.
- Release date: July 26, 1985
- Running time: 94 minutes
- Country: United States
- Language: English
- Budget: $17 million
- Box office: $49.3 million

National Lampoon's European Vacation is a 1985 American comedy film directed by Amy Heckerling and written by Robert Klane based on characters created by John Hughes. The second installment in National Lampoon's Vacation film series, it stars Chevy Chase, Beverly D'Angelo, Dana Hill, Jason Lively, Victor Lanoux, and Eric Idle with special appearances by John Astin, Paul Bartel, Maureen Lipman, Willy Millowitsch, Mel Smith, and Moon Zappa. It tells the story of the Griswold family when they win an all-expense-paid trip to Europe as chaos of all sorts occur. National Lampoon's European Vacation was released by Warner Bros. on July 26, 1985. The film received mixed reviews from critics, but was a financial success, grossing $49.3 million against a $17 million budget.

== Plot ==
Sometime after their trip to Wally World, the Griswold family competes in a game show and win an all-expense-paid trip to Europe. They first stay in a sordid London hotel. While in their English rental car, Clark's tendency to drive on the wrong side of the road causes frequent accidents. Later, Clark drives the family around the busy Lambeth Bridge roundabout for hours, unable to maneuver out of the chaotic traffic. At Stonehenge, he accidentally backs the car into an ancient stone monolith, toppling all but one of the stones like dominoes.

In Paris, the family's camcorder is stolen by a passerby whom Clark had asked to take a picture of the family. Clark is also mocked by a French waiter for his terrible French, although he is oblivious. The family wears stenciled berets, causing Rusty to be teased by young women at the Eiffel Tower observation deck. Clark offers to get rid of the beret for Rusty, but when he throws it away, another visitor's dog jumps off the tower after it, landing safely in a fountain. Later, Clark and Ellen visit a bawdy Paris can-can dance show, finding Rusty there with a prostitute.

Next, in a West German village, the Griswolds burst in on a bewildered elderly couple, whom they mistakenly think are relatives due to misreading the address, but the couple provides them dinner and lodging anyway, neither family understanding the other's language. Clark turns a lively Bavarian folk dance stage performance into an all-out street brawl, which he flees, hastily knocking down several street vendors' stands and gets their car stuck in a narrow medieval archway.

In Rome, the Griswolds rent a car at a travel office, unaware that the men in charge are thieves holding the real manager captive. The lead thief gives them a car with the manager in the trunk, claiming he lost the trunk key. The next day, a humiliated Ellen discovers that private, sexy images of her from the stolen camcorder have been used in a billboard advertising porn. After screaming at Clark, who lied about erasing the video, she storms off to their hotel and encounters the thief who rented them the car. She confesses her troubles, unaware he is a criminal. When the police arrive at the hotel, he kidnaps Ellen and takes her away in the car. Clark chases the thief and he is eventually arrested.

On the flight home, Clark tries to find a WC, but falls into the pilot's cockpit and accidentally forces the plane to drop altitude, knocking the Statue of Liberty's torch upside down as Rusty declares "Yep, the Griswolds are back."

== Cast ==
The Griswolds:

- Chevy Chase as Clark Griswold, the Griswold family patriarch
- Beverly D'Angelo as Ellen Griswold, the Griswold family matriarch
- Dana Hill as Audrey Griswold, Clark and Ellen's daughter (played by Dana Barron in the preceding film)
- Jason Lively as Russell "Rusty" Griswold, Clark and Ellen's son (played by Anthony Michael Hall in the preceding film)

Characters in America:

- John Astin as Kent Winkdale, the host of Pig in a Poke
- Paul Bartel as Mr. Froeger, the patriarch of the Froeger family that competed against the Griswolds on Pig in a Poke
- Cynthia Szigeti as Mrs. Froeger, the wife of Mr. Froeger
- Malcolm Danare as Moe Froeger, the son of Mr. and Mrs. Froeger
- Kevi Kendall as Ruth Froeger, the daughter of Mr. and Mrs. Froeger
- William Zabka as Jack, Audrey's boyfriend
- Sheila Kennedy as the Game Show Hostess #1.
- Gary Owens as the voice of Johnny (uncredited), the announcer of Pig in a Poke

Characters in England:

- Eric Idle as The Bike Rider, an unnamed bike rider with whom the Griswolds have several accidental encounters all over Europe
- Maureen Lipman as a lady in the bed of a room that Clark mistakes as his bedroom
- Mel Smith as London hotel manager
- Gwen Nelson as London hotel manager's mother
- Jeannette Charles as Queen Elizabeth II, the Queen of the United Kingdom who appears in Ellen's dream sequence.
- Peter Hugo as Prince Charles, the son of Queen Elizabeth II who appears in Ellen's dream sequence.
- Julie Wooldridge as Princess Diana, the wife of Prince Charles who appears in Ellen's dream sequence.
- Robbie Coltrane as a man that uses the bathroom while Ellen is in the bathtub
- Paul McDowell as First English motorist
- Ballard Berkeley as Second English motorist
- Derek Deadman as Taxi Driver

Characters in France:

- Didler Pain as Paris video camera thief
- Jacques Herlin as French hotel desk clerk
- Jacques Maury as other French hotel desk clerk
- Sylvie Badalati as Rusty's French girl
- Alice Sapritch as dowager on the Eiffel Tower
- Phillippe Sturbelle as rude Paris cafe waiter

Characters in Germany:

- Willy Millowitsch as Fritz Spritz, the supposed relative of Clark
- Erika Wackernagel as Helga Spritz, the wife of Fritz and a supposed relative of Clark
- Claudia Neidig as Claudia, Rusty's German girlfriend

Characters in Italy:

- Victor Lanoux as The Thief, first unnamed criminal robbing a travel office
- Massimo Sarchielli as The Other Thief, second unnamed criminal robbing the travel office
- Moon Zappa as Rusty's California girlfriend visiting Rome

== Production ==
John Hughes received nominal credit for writing and story, due to the use of characters and ideas from the first Vacation film, but was not directly involved with European Vacation. Hughes would later state that Warner Bros. had begged him for a sequel to Vacation but he declined at the time. He would eventually agree to return to the franchise by adapting one of his other National Lampoon stories, "Christmas '59," into National Lampoon's Christmas Vacation in 1989.

=== Casting ===
Producer Matty Simmons initially told Dana Barron she would be returning to the role of Audrey. But after Anthony Michael Hall declined to reprise his role and was opting to star in Weird Science, Heckerling requested both children be recast.

=== Locations ===
Famous landmarks and sights appearing as the family tours England, France, West Germany, and Italy include:

- London's Tower Bridge
- Lambeth Bridge Roundabout (Clark drives the car into the inner ring and can't get out of the traffic)
- Buckingham Palace
- Heathrow Airport, Hillingdon, Greater London
- Big Ben (Clark repeatedly announces to the kids on every loop around the Lambeth Bridge roundabout)
- Palace of Westminster
- Stonehenge
- Paris's Left Bank
- Fontaine des Innocents
- Eiffel Tower
- Louvre museum
- Notre Dame de Paris cathedral
- Rome's Colosseum
- Spanish Steps
- Piazza Navona

Other locations used in the film include:

- Statue of Liberty (the torch of which their plane crashes into and knocks over)
- Notting Hill, West London (Clark runs over Eric Idle's character here)

Scenes supposedly taking place in West Germany were actually shot in a German-speaking part of Italy (Brixen).

== Music ==
The musical score for National Lampoon's European Vacation was composed by Charles Fox, who replaced Ralph Burns of the first film. Lindsey Buckingham's "Holiday Road" was once again featured as the film's theme song, with many other contemporary songs included throughout the film.

1. "Holiday Road" by Lindsey Buckingham
2. "Some Like It Hot" by the Power Station
3. "Town Called Malice" by the Jam
4. "Problèmes d'amour" by Alexander Robotnick
5. "Ça plane pour moi" by Plastic Bertrand
6. "Pig In a Poke" by Danny Gould
7. "Baby It's You, Yes I Am" by Danger Zone
8. "New Looks" by Dr. John
9. "Back in America" by Network

== Release ==
=== Home media ===
Initially the film was on VHS by Warner Home Video on 30 March 1987. It was first released on DVD in the United States on April 2, 2002 by Warner Home Video with special features including audio commentary by Chevy Chase and official trailer. It was subsequently issued on Blu-ray in 2010 in the U.S. with the commentary ported over from the DVD.

== Reception ==
=== Box office ===
National Lampoon's European Vacation opened July 26, 1985 in 1,546 North American theaters and grossed $12,329,627 its opening weekend, ranking number one at the box office. After its initial run, the film grossed a total of $49,364,621 domestically.

=== Critical response ===
Review aggregation website Rotten Tomatoes gives National Lampoon's European Vacation a score of 37% based on reviews from 30 critics, with an average of 5.1 out of 10. The critical consensus reads; "European Vacation charts a course through a succession of pretty destinations, but the journey itself lacks the laughs that made the original outing so memorable." On Metacritic, it has a score of 47 out of 100 based on 10 critics, indicating "mixed or average reviews".

Janet Maslin of The New York Times thought positively of the film stating, "While it's very much a retread, it succeeds in following up the first film's humor with more in a similar vein." She added, "The film's best visual humor arises from the mere juxtaposition of European settings with the funny hats, T-shirts and soda cans with which the Griswolds announce their presence." Entertainment magazine Variety gave the film a negative review explaining, "As the family of characters cartwheel through London, Paris, Italy and Germany - with the French deliciously taking it on the chin for their arrogance and rudeness - director Amy Heckerling gets carried away with physical humor while letting her American tourists grow tiresome and predictable. Structurally, the film unfolds like a series of travel brochures."

== Sequel ==
A sequel titled National Lampoon's Christmas Vacation, was released in 1989.
