= National Lampoon's Christmas Vacation =

1989 film by Jeremiah S. Chechik

- Theatrical release poster by Chris Consani
- Directed by: Jeremiah Chechik
- Written by: John Hughes
- Produced by: John Hughes; Tom Jacobson
- Starring: Chevy Chase; Beverly D'Angelo; Randy Quaid
- Cinematography: Thomas E. Ackerman
- Edited by: Gerald B. Greenberg; Michael A. Stevenson
- Music by: Angelo Badalamenti
- Production companies: Warner Bros.; Hughes Entertainment
- Distributed by: Warner Bros.
- Release date: December 1, 1989
- Running time: 97 minutes
- Country: United States
- Language: English
- Budget: $25 million
- Box office: $78.9 million

National Lampoon's Christmas Vacation is a 1989 American Christmas slapstick comedy film and the third installment in National Lampoon magazine's National Lampoon's Vacation film series. It was directed by Jeremiah Chechik and written and produced by John Hughes. The film's ensemble cast is led by Chevy Chase, Beverly D'Angelo, and Randy Quaid, while also featuring Mae Questel in her final film role before her death in 1998.

Inspired by Hughes' short story, "Christmas '59", published in National Lampoon, the film tells the story of Clark Griswold's efforts to have a good old-fashioned family Christmas, even as those efforts take a chaotic turn for the worse. It is the final film in the series to involve Hughes and National Lampoon. Filming took place in Summit County, Colorado, Silverthorne, Breckenridge, and Frisco as well as Burbank, California between March and June 1989. The film was produced by Hughes Entertainment and released by Warner Bros. on December 1, 1989. It performed well at the box office, grossing $78.9 million against a $25 million budget. It initially received generally mixed reviews from critics, but the film's critical reception improved over time, and it is now viewed as a Christmas classic.

== Plot ==
Chicago-area resident Clark Griswold intends to have a "Good old fashioned" Christmas with his entire family. He drives his wife Ellen and children Audrey and Rusty out to the country to find a tree, ultimately choosing the largest one they can find. Realizing too late that they did not bring any tools to cut down the tree, they are forced to uproot it instead. Clark's holiday plans inadvertently cause steadily escalating chaos for the family's yuppie neighbors, Todd and Margo Chester.

Clark's and Ellen's parents arrive for Christmas, and their bickering quickly begins to annoy the family. However, Clark maintains a positive attitude and remains undeterred in his plans. He covers the house's exterior with 25,000 lights, which temporarily cause a citywide power shortage – once he gets them to work properly.

Ellen's cousin Catherine and her redneck husband Eddie Johnson arrive unannounced in an RV with two of their younger children, 7-year-old Ruby Sue and 6-year-old Rocky, and their pet Rottweiler Snots. Clark and Ellen grow concerned when Rocky and Ruby Sue both express doubts in the existence of Santa Claus, and Eddie later admits they have been forced to live in the RV. Clark offers to buy gifts for Eddie's kids so they can still enjoy Christmas. On Christmas Eve, Clark's senile Aunt Bethany and cantankerous Uncle Lewis also arrive to celebrate.

Clark begins to get desperate, wondering why his boss Frank Shirley has not given him his yearly bonus. Clark has been counting on the bonus to pay for a new swimming pool. Anticipating the check's arrival, Clark had already put a down payment, despite lacking sufficient funds in the bank. After a disastrous Christmas Eve dinner due to the overcooked turkey, Aunt Bethany's cat is electrocuted and Uncle Lewis accidentally burns down the Christmas tree while lighting his cigar.

A courier delivers an envelope. Instead of the bonus Clark expects, it is an annual membership in the Jelly of the Month Club. Facing financial ruin, Clark snaps into a profanity-laden tirade and says that if anyone wishes to get him a last-minute Christmas gift, he would like Mr. Shirley delivered to the house, wrapped as a present, so he can personally insult him to his face.

Clark next cuts down a tree on the Chesters' yard as a final resort. However, when he sets it up, a squirrel living inside runs out and wreaks havoc throughout the house. Family members start to leave, but Clark snaps at them to stay, obsessed with Christmas not yet being over. Clark's father talks privately with him, telling Clark that he understands his desperation to have a perfect Christmas, but that he should not ruin his relationships with his family in the process. Clark apologizes and gathers everyone to recite "The Night Before Christmas".

Having taken Clark's request literally, Eddie kidnaps Mr. Shirley and brings him to the house. Shirley admits to canceling the Christmas bonuses but then reinstates them in the face of Clark's chastisement. Mrs. Helen Shirley calls the police and a SWAT team storms the Griswold house, holding everyone at gunpoint. Frank, however, decides not to press charges, revealing his change of heart.

The family goes outside when Rocky and Ruby Sue believe they see Santa Claus in the distance. Clark tells them it is actually the Christmas Star and that he finally realizes what the holiday means to him. Uncle Lewis says that the light is coming from a sewage treatment plant, which reminds Clark that Eddie had been dumping his RV sewage into the nearby storm drain. Before Clark can stop him, Uncle Lewis lights another cigar and tosses the match into the drain. This causes a giant gas explosion, knocking everyone over, and launching Santa's sleigh decoration into the sky. Aunt Bethany starts singing "The Star-Spangled Banner" and everyone joins in as the flaming decoration sails in the distance.

The entire family, along with the Shirleys and the SWAT team, go inside to celebrate while Clark and Ellen share a Christmas kiss. Clark is satisfied that he has provided a great Christmas for his family.

== Cast ==
- Chevy Chase as Clark Griswold Jr, the patriarch of the Griswold family who works at a food preservative company
  - Devin Bailey as Clark (age 9)
- Beverly D'Angelo as Ellen Griswold, the matriarch of the Griswold family
- Juliette Lewis as Audrey Griswold, the 15-year-old daughter of Clark & Ellen. Audrey was portrayed by Dana Barron and Dana Hill in the preceding films.
- Johnny Galecki as Russell "Rusty" Griswold, the 11-year-old son of Clark & Ellen. Russ was portrayed by Anthony Michael Hall and Jason Lively in the precedeing films.
- John Randolph as Clark Griswold Sr., Clark's father and Audrey & Rusty's paternal grandfather
- Diane Ladd as Nora Griswold, Clark's mother and Audrey & Rusty's paternal grandmother
- E. G. Marshall as Arthur "Art" Smith, Ellen's father and Audrey & Rusty's maternal grandfather
- Doris Roberts as Frances Smith, Ellen's mother and Audrey & Rusty's maternal grandmother
- Miriam Flynn as Catherine Johnson, Ellen's maternal cousin
- Randy Quaid as Eddie Johnson, Catherine's husband, Ellen & Clark's cousin-in-law
- Ellen Hamilton Latzen as Ruby Sue Johnson, the 7-year-old daughter of Eddie & Catherine and cousin of Audrey & Rusty who was formerly cross-eyed
- Cody Burger as Rocky Johnson, the 6-year-old son of Eddie & Catherine and cousin of Audrey & Rusty who has an unidentified lip fungus
- William Hickey as Uncle Lewis, Clark's paternal uncle and Audrey & Rusty's paternal great-uncle who wears a bad wig and smokes cigars
- Mae Questel as Aunt Bethany, Clark's 80-year-old paternal aunt and Audrey and Rusty's paternal great-aunt who is senile
- Sam McMurray as Bill, Clark's co-worker at the food preservative company
- Julia Louis-Dreyfus as Margo Chester, the Griswold family's yuppie neighbor who takes the brunt of their shenanigans
- Nicholas Guest as Todd Chester, Margo's husband
- Brian Doyle-Murray as Frank Shirley, Clark's boss at the food preservative company
- Natalia Nogulich as Helen Shirley, Frank's wife
- Doug Llewelyn as the voice of the Parade Announcer
- Nicolette Scorsese as Mary, the sales clerk whom Clark briefly fantasizes over
- Alexander Folk as the lead SWAT officer

== Production ==
=== Development and writing ===
National Lampoon's Christmas Vacation originated from a short story by writer John Hughes called "Christmas '59", which was published in the December 1980 issue of National Lampoon magazine. "The studio came to me and begged for another one, and I only agreed because I had a good story to base it on," said Hughes. "But those movies have become little more than Chevy Chase vehicles." Director Chris Columbus initially was to direct the film, but due to a personality clash between himself and Chevy Chase, Columbus left the film and was replaced by Jeremiah S. Chechik. Hughes eventually gave Columbus the script to Home Alone.

=== Casting ===
Chevy Chase, Beverly D'Angelo, Randy Quaid, and Miriam Flynn were the only actors to reprise their roles from the previous National Lampoon's Vacation films. As with European Vacation (1985), the roles of the Griswold children were recast, a practice that continued in subsequent installments. Johnny Galecki inherited the role of Rusty from Jason Lively and Anthony Michael Hall. In the casting process he prevailed over several actors, including Leonardo DiCaprio, whom casting team member Heidi Levitt later described as too "thoughful" and not "goofy enough" for the character. Diane Ladd, only six years senior to Chevy Chase, auditioned for the role of Clarke’s mother, Nora, wearing a dress that had belonged to her friend Shelley Winters' mother. She ultimately secured the part over June Allyson and Alice Ghostley. Model Christie Brinkley declined to reprise the role she had originated in National Lampoon's Vacation (1983), following the advice of her late father, who disliked the idea of her becoming typecast. The role was subsequently filled by Nicolette Scorsese.

=== Filming ===
Principal photography began on March 27, 1989, in Summit County, Colorado, with footage shot in Silverthorne, Breckenridge, and Frisco. From there the production moved to Warner Bros. Ranch Facilities in Burbank, California, where the set of the Griswold family's house and street is located. During the squirrel scene, the crew initially hired a trained squirrel, but it died from a heart attack before they filmed it. They eventually hired an un-trained squirrel at the last minute. The scene took three days to shoot. The animated title sequence was created by Kroyer Films. Filming wrapped on June 30, 1989.

== Music ==
The musical score for National Lampoon's Christmas Vacation was composed by Angelo Badalamenti and conducted by Shirley Walker. It is the only installment of the Vacation film series not to include Lindsey Buckingham's "Holiday Road". In its place is a song entitled "Christmas Vacation" with music by Barry Mann, lyrics by Cynthia Weil and performed by Mavis Staples of The Staple Singers fame. The song was covered in 2007 by High School Musical star Monique Coleman for the 2007 Christmas album Disney Channel Holiday. Popular Christmas songs featured in the film include Bing Crosby & The Andrews Sisters Hawaiian-themed "Mele Kalikimaka", and, during the climax of the film, Gene Autry's "Here Comes Santa Claus". For the latter song, Autry's re-recorded 1957 Challenge Records version is used.

Despite several popular songs being present in the film, no official soundtrack album was released. In 1999, a bootleg copy containing music featured in the film along with select cuts of dialogue dubbed as the "10th Anniversary Limited Edition" began to appear on Internet auction sites with the claim that Warner Bros. and RedDotNet had pressed 20,000 CDs for Six Flags Magic Mountain employees to sell to customers entering the park but that only 7,000 had been sold and now the remainder were being made available to the public. However forums at movie music sites such as SoundtrackCollector later declared the disc to be a bootleg due to its inaccuracies. For instance, the cut "Christmas Vacation Medley" (claiming to be the work of composer Angelo Badalamenti) is really a track called "Christmas at Carnegie Hall" from Home Alone 2: Lost in New York by composer John Williams and does not actually contain any of Badalamenti's Christmas Vacation score.

== Release ==
=== Home media ===
The film has been released on home media several different times: VHS and Laserdisc in early 1990, a bare bones full-screen DVD in 1997, and a widescreen "Special Edition" DVD in 2003. HD DVD as well as Blu-ray editions were released in 2006. In 2009, a second Blu-ray of the film was released as an "Ultimate Collector's Edition". A steelbook Blu-ray was released in 2015 with remastered picture quality, and a second steelbook was released in 2019. On November 1, 2022, the film was released on 4K Ultra HD for the first time.

== Reception ==
=== Box office ===
The movie debuted at No. 2 at the box-office while grossing $11,750,203 during the opening weekend, behind Back to the Future Part II. The movie eventually topped the box-office charts in its third week of release and remained No. 1 the following weekend. It went on to gross a total of $78,914,670 worldwide while showing in movie theaters. It was the highest-grossing film in the series, until the release of Vacation in 2015.

=== Critical response ===
At the time of the film's release, the film received mixed reviews. Over time, many have deemed it a Christmas classic. Review aggregator Rotten Tomatoes reports that 72% of 58 film critics have given the film a positive review, with a rating average of 6.2/10. The site's consensus reads, "While Christmas Vacation may not be the most disciplined comedy, it's got enough laughs and good cheer to make for a solid seasonal treat." Another review aggregation website, Metacritic, assigned the film a rating of 49 out of 100 based on 18 reviews, indicating "mixed or average reviews". Audiences polled by CinemaScore gave the film an average grade of "B+" on an A+ to F scale.

Entertainment magazine Variety responded positively to the film stating, "Solid family fare with plenty of yucks, National Lampoon's Christmas Vacation is Chevy Chase and brood doing what they do best. Despite the title, which links it to previous pics in the rambling Vacation series, this third entry is firmly rooted at the Griswold family homestead, where Clark Griswold (Chase) is engaged in a typical over-reaching attempt to give his family a perfect, old-fashioned Christmas." Rita Kempley of The Washington Post gave the film a positive review explaining that "it will prove pater-familiar to fans of the 1983 original and the European Vacation sequel. Only it's a bit more whimsical."

Roger Ebert of the Chicago Sun-Times gave the film two out of four stars, saying, "The movie is curious in how close it comes to delivering on its material: Sequence after sequence seems to contain all the necessary material, to be well on the way toward a payoff, and then it somehow doesn't work."

== Franchise ==
=== Sequel ===
The fourth film in the series, Vegas Vacation, would follow in 1997, and was the first to not involve either Hughes or National Lampoon.

=== Spin-off ===
In 2003, NBC aired a spin-off called National Lampoon's Christmas Vacation 2 which featured Cousin Eddie's family on a Christmas vacation in the South Pacific. Quaid, Flynn, and Dana Barron reprise their roles from the previous Vacation films alongside series newcomers Jake Thomas, Edward Asner, Sung Hi Lee, and Fred Willard.

== In popular culture ==
In 2012, Chase, D'Angelo, and Lewis reunited for Christmas Vacation-themed ads for Old Navy. The series of ads also featured the other actors who portrayed past versions of Russ and Audrey. In 2020, Chase and D'Angelo reprised their roles as Clark and Ellen in a Ford commercial for the Ford Mustang Mach-E spoofing the house lighting scene. The movie has inspired the theme for various Christmas lights and decoration displays over the years. In 2026, Lego announced that a project submitted in 2025 that hit the 10,000 supporters based the Griswold house would become an official Lego set under the Lego Ideas line.

== See also ==
- List of National Lampoon films
- List of Christmas films
