= Vinnie Hobbs =

American film editor

- Born: Vincent Hobbs; Okinawa, Japan
- Occupations: Film Editor, Sound Designer, Filmmaker

Vinnie Hobbs (born March 18 in Okinawa, Japan) is an American film editor known for working with artists such as Kendrick Lamar, Britney Spears, Future, Nicki Minaj, Big Sean, Drake, Kanye West, and Skrillex. He was nominated for MTV's Video Music Award for Best Editing in 2016, 2017 and 2019.

== Awards and honors ==
- 2023 Grammy Award for Best Music Video [Nominated] (Doja Cat - "Woman")
- 2021 MTV Video Music Award for Best Editing [Nominated] (Justin Bieber feat. Giveon & Daniel Caesar - "Peaches")
- 2019 MTV Video Music Award for Best Editing [Nominated] (Anderson .Paak feat. Kendrick Lamar - "TINTS")
- 2019 MTV Video Music Award for Best Editing [Nominated] (Solange - "Almeda")
- 2019 MTV Video Music Award for Best Hip-Hop Video [Won] (Cardi B - "Money")
- 2017 MTV Video Music Award for Best Editing [Nominated] (Future - "Mask Off")
- 2017 MTV Video Music Award for Video of the Year [Nominated] (DJ Khaled feat. Rihanna & Bryson Tiller - "Wild Thoughts")
- 2016 MTV Video Music Award for Best Editing [Nominated] (Fergie - "M.I.L.F. $")
- 2016 Grammy Award for Best Music Video [Nominated] (Kendrick Lamar - "Alright")
- 2015 MTV Video Music Award for Video of the Year [Nominated] (Kendrick Lamar - "Alright")
- 2015 MTV Video Music Award for Best Hip-Hop Video [Won] (Nicki Minaj - "Anaconda")
- 2015 7x7 Magazine: 2015 Hot 20
- 2014 Santa Barbara International Film Festival: Best Documentary Film Award [Nominated] (The Village of Peace)
- 2013 SXSW: Narrative Feature Competition Award [Nominated] (Licks)

== Filmography ==
=== Feature films ===
- Unbanned: The Legend of AJ1 (2019) - consulting editor
- Licks (2016) - editor, sound designer
- The Village of Peace (2014) - editor

=== Music Video Editor ===
2022

- Cardi B feat. Kanye West & Lil Durk - "Hot Shit"
- Doja Cat - "Vegas"
- Rosalía - "Chicken Teriyaki"
- Justin Bieber & Omah Lay - "Attention"

2021

- Post Malone & The Weeknd - "One Right Now"
- Doja Cat - "Woman"
- Justin Bieber - "Ghost"
- Cardi B - "Up"
- Justin Bieber - "Anyone"
- Jennifer Lopez - "In the Morning"

2020

- Cardi B feat. Megan Thee Stallion - "WAP"
- Justin Bieber feat. Chance the Rapper - "Holy"
- Machine Gun Kelly - "Bloody Valentine"
- Megan Thee Stallion feat. Young Thug - "Don't Stop"

2019

- Solange Knowles - "Almeda"
- Post Malone feat. Young Thug - "Goodbyes"
- Jennifer Lopez - "Medicine"
- YG feat. Tyga, Jon Z - "Go Loko"
- DJ Snake feat. J Balvin, Tyga - "Loco Contigo"

2018

- Cardi B - "Money"
- Nicki Minaj feat. Lil Wayne - "Good Form"
- Anderson Paak feat. Kendrick Lamar - "TINTS"
- DJ Khaled feat. Justin Bieber, Chance The Rapper & Quavo - "No Brainer"
- Jay Rock - "The Bloodiest"
- Kygo feat. Miguel - "Remind Me to Forget"
- Bryson Tiller - "Self-Made"
- Lil Pump - "Gucci Gang"

2017

- Future - "Mask Off"
- DJ Khaled feat. Rihanna & Bryson Tiller - "Wild Thoughts"
- Kyle feat. Lil Yachty - "iSpy"
- Bebe Rexha - "I Got You"
- DJ Snake feat. Jeremih, Young Thug & Swizz Beatz - "The Half"
- Romeo Santos - "Héroe Favorito"
- DRAM feat. Juicy J & ASAP Rocky - "Gilligan"

2016

- Britney Spears feat. Tinashe - "Slumber Party"
- Schoolboy Q feat. Kanye West - "That Part"
- Fergie - "M.I.L.F. $"
- Skrillex feat. Rick Ross - "Purple Lamborghini"
- Luke Bryan - "Move"

2015

- Chris Brown, Tyga - "Ayo"
- Big Sean feat. Drake & Kanye West - "Blessings"
- Rihanna - "American Oxygen"
- DJ Khaled feat. Lil Wayne, Chris Brown, and Big Sean - "How Many Times"
- Nicky Jam feat. Enrique Iglesias - "El Perdón"
- Pia Mia feat. Chris Brown & Tyga - "Do It Again"
- Kendrick Lamar - "Alright"
- Miguel - "waves"
- Kendrick Lamar - "These Walls"

2014

- Nicki Minaj - "Anaconda"
- Kid Ink feat. Usher & Tinashe - "Body Language"
- Jason Derulo - "Wiggle"

2013

- Sean Kingston feat. Wiz Khalifa & Chris Brown - "Beat It"
- Ace Hood feat. Lil Wayne - "We Outchea"
- Yo Gotti feat. Jeezy & YG - "Act Right"
- Rick Ross feat. Future - "No Games"
