= Songs from the Small Machine: Live in L.A. =

Live album by Lindsey Buckingham
- Released: November 1, 2011
- Recorded: April 22, 2011
- Venue: Saban Theatre (Beverly Hills)
- Genre: Rock
- Length: 142 minutes
- Label: Eagle Rock Entertainment/Mind Kit Records
- Producer: Barry Ehrmann

Lindsey Buckingham chronology
Seeds We Sow (2011)	Songs from the Small Machine: Live in L.A. (2011)	One Man Show (2012)

Professional ratings
Review scores
Source	Rating
The Republican	3.5/5 stars

Songs from the Small Machine: Live in L.A. is a live album by Fleetwood Mac guitarist/vocalist Lindsey Buckingham. The album was released on November 1, 2011 on standard DVD and Blu-ray, with the standard DVD containing a CD of the tracks and both formats featuring an interview with Buckingham.

The performances were recorded at the Saban Theatre in Beverly Hills on April 22, 2011 prior to the release of his Seeds We Sow album. Six songs from his then-forthcoming album were played during the show, which was filmed in high definition and offered with DTS Surround-Sound, Dolby Digital 5.1, and Dolby Digital Stereo. Buckingham commented on the approach to the album's mix, saying that "there's only so much you can do with a live 5.1 mix. You want to keep real in terms of how people are hearing it in the room, so you're not going to start throwing instruments in the back, as you might on a studio kind of thing. It's all about the audience."

For the setlist, Buckingham began with an acoustic solo set, which included a reworked version "Go Insane". For most of the remaining material, he was accompanied by a three-piece band, who joined him for material that pulled from his work in Fleetwood Mac and as a solo artist, including his work from Seeds We Sow, which at the time was Buckingham's most recent solo release.

== Track listing ==
All tracks written by Buckingham except where noted.

1. "Shut Us Down" (Buckingham, Cory Sipper)
2. "Go Insane"
3. "Trouble"
4. "Never Going Back Again"
5. "Big Love"
6. "Under The Skin"
7. "All My Sorrows" (Traditional)
8. "In Our Own Time"
9. "Illumination"
10. "Second Hand News"
11. "Tusk"
12. "Stars Are Crazy" (Buckingham, Lisa Dewey)
13. "End of Time"
14. "That's the Way That Love Goes"
15. "I'm So Afraid"
16. "Go Your Own Way"
17. "Turn It On" (Buckingham, Richard Dashut)
18. "Treason"
19. "Seeds We Sow"

== Personnel ==
- Lindsey Buckingham – guitar, lead vocals
- Brett Tuggle – bass, keyboards, backing vocals
- Neale Heywood – guitar, backing vocals
- Walfredo Reyes Jr. – drums, percussion
