= MTV Video Music Award for Best Editing =

Annual music video award

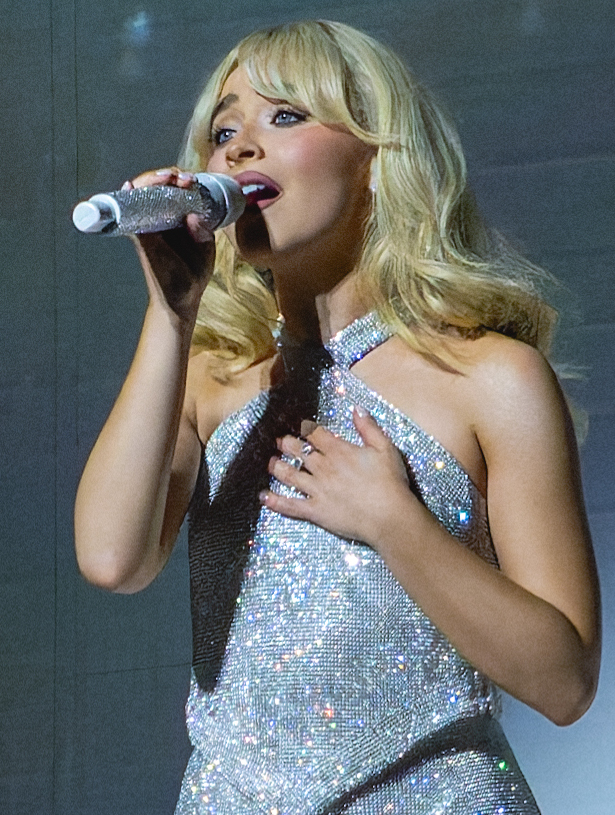
- "House Tour" by Sabrina Carpenter is the most recent recipient.
- Awarded for: Editing
- Country: United States
- Presented by: MTV
- First award: 1984
- Currently held by: Sofia Kerpan at Modern Post – "House Tour" by Sabrina Carpenter (2026)

Highlights
- Most wins: Beyoncé (4); Jarrett Fijal & Ken Mowe (3)
- Most nominations: Beyoncé and Taylor Swift (7); Jarrett Fijal (8)
- Website: VMA website

The MTV Video Music Award for Best Editing is a craft award given to the artist, the artist's manager, and the editor of the music video. From 1984 to 2007, the award's full name was Best Editing in a Video, before acquiring its current name in 2008.

The biggest winners are Jarrett Fijal and Ken Mowe with three wins each. Jim Haygood, Eric Zumbrunnen, and Robert Duffy follow closely behind with two wins each. The most nominated editor is Jarrett Fijal with eight followed by Robert Duffy with seven. Closely following them is Jim Haygood with six nominations.

The performer whose videos have won the most awards is Beyoncé. Beyoncé's and Taylor Swift's videos have received the most nominations with seven each. Beyoncé and Billie Eilish are the only performers to have won a Moonman in this category for their work co-editing "7/11" in 2015 and editing "Bad Guy" in 2019 respectively. However, three other performers have been nominated for their work co-editing videos: George Michael ("Freedom! '90"), Jared Leto ("Hurricane"), and Ryan Lewis ("Can't Hold Us").

== Recipients ==
=== 1980s ===
Year	Winner(s)	Work	Nominees	Ref.
1984	Roo Aiken and Godley & Creme	"Rockit" (performed by Herbie Hancock)	"Every Breath You Take" – Roo Aiken and Godley & Creme (performed by The Police); "Eyes Without a Face" – Kris Trexler (performed by Billy Idol); "I'm Still Standing" – Warren Lynch (performed by Elton John); "Legs" – Sim Sadler and Bob Sarles (performed by ZZ Top); "The Reflex" – Steven Priest (performed by Duran Duran); "Sharp Dressed Man" – Sim Sadler (performed by ZZ Top)	
1985	Zbigniew Rybczyński	"Close (to the Edit)" (performed by Art of Noise)	"Go Insane" – David Yardley (performed by Lindsey Buckingham); "Run to You" – John Mister (performed by Bryan Adams); "Slow Dancing" – David Yardley (performed by Lindsey Buckingham); "Would I Lie to You?" – Glenn Morgan (performed by Eurythmics)	
1986	David Yardley	"The Sun Always Shines on T.V." (performed by a-ha)	"Burning House of Love" – Dan Blevins (performed by X); "Money for Nothing" – David Yardley (performed by Dire Straits); "Rough Boy" – Richard Uber (performed by ZZ Top); "Sex as a Weapon" – Richard Uber (performed by Pat Benatar)	
1987	Colin Green	"Sledgehammer" (performed by Peter Gabriel)	"C'est La Vie" – Rick Elgood (performed by Robbie Nevil); "Missionary Man" – John Carroll (performed by Eurythmics); "Higher Love" – Peter Kagan, Laura Israel and Glen Lazzarro (performed by Steve Winwood); "Wanted Dead or Alive" – Lisa Hendricks (performed by Bon Jovi); "With or Without You" – Meiert Avis (performed by U2)	
1988	Richard Lowenstein	"Need You Tonight/Mediate" (performed by INXS)	"Devil Inside" – Steve Purcell (performed by INXS); "Notorious" – Jim Haygood (performed by Loverboy); "Tunnel of Love" – Greg Dougherty (performed by Bruce Springsteen); "U Got the Look" – Charley Randazzo and Steve Purcell (performed by Prince)	
1989	Jim Haygood	"Straight Up" (performed by Paula Abdul)	"Express Yourself" – Scott Chestnut (performed by Madonna); "Leave Me Alone" – Paul Diener (performed by Michael Jackson); "Real Love" – Scott Chestnut (performed by Jody Watley); "Roll with It" – Scott Chestnut (performed by Steve Winwood)	

=== 1990s ===
Year	Winner(s)	Work	Nominees	Ref.
1990	Jim Haygood	"Vogue" (performed by Madonna)	"The End of the Innocence" – Jim Haygood (performed by Don Henley); "Janie's Got a Gun" – Jim Haygood (performed by Aerosmith); "U Can't Touch This" – Jonathan Siegel (performed by MC Hammer)	
1991	Robert Duffy	"Losing My Religion" (performed by R.E.M.)	"Crazy" – Big TV! (performed by Seal); "Freedom! '90" – Jim Haygood and George Michael (performed by George Michael); "Gonna Make You Sweat (Everybody Dance Now)" – Marcus Nispel (performed by C+C Music Factory); "Groove Is in the Heart" – Hiroyuki Nakano (performed by Deee-Lite); "Wicked Game (Concept)" – Bob Jenkis (performed by Chris Isaak)	
1992	Mitchell Sinoway	"Right Now" (performed by Van Halen)	"Enter Sandman" – Jay Torres (performed by Metallica); "Even Better Than the Real Thing" – Jerry Chater (performed by U2); "Give It Away" – Veronique Labels and Olivier Gajan (performed by Red Hot Chili Peppers); "My Lovin' (You're Never Gonna Get It)" – Robert Duffy (performed by En Vogue)	
1993	Douglas Jines	"Steam" (performed by Peter Gabriel)	"Man on the Moon" – Robert Duffy (performed by R.E.M.); "Shock to the System" – Jim Gable (performed by Billy Idol); "Sleeping Satellite" – Jeff Panzer, Doug Kluthe and Evan Stone (performed by Tasmin Archer)	
1994	Pat Sheffield	"Everybody Hurts" (performed by R.E.M.)	"Amazing" – Troy Okoniewski and Jay Torres (performed by Aerosmith); "Backwater" – Katz (performed by Meat Puppets); "Disarm" – Pat Sheffield (performed by The Smashing Pumpkins); "Human Behaviour" – Michel Gondry (performed by Björk); "Kiss That Frog" – Craig Wood (performed by Peter Gabriel); "Sweet Lullaby" – Robert Duffy (performed by Deep Forest); "Vasoline" – Kevin Kerslake (performed by Stone Temple Pilots)	
1995	Eric Zumbrunnen	"Buddy Holly" (performed by Weezer)	"Basket Case" – Alan Chimenti (performed by Green Day); "I Kissed a Girl" – Jerry Behrens (performed by Jill Sobule); "Scream" – Robert Duffy (performed by Michael Jackson and Janet Jackson); "Waterfalls" – Jonathan Silver (performed by TLC)	
1996	Scott Gray	"Ironic" (performed by Alanis Morissette)	"Tonight, Tonight" – Eric Zumbrunnen (performed by The Smashing Pumpkins); "Warped" – Hal Honigsberg (performed by Red Hot Chili Peppers); "Where It's At" – Eric Zumbrunnen (performed by Beck)	
1997	Hank Corwin	"Devils Haircut" (performed by Beck)	"The End Is the Beginning Is the End" – Hal Honigsberg (performed by The Smashing Pumpkins); "One Headlight" – Einar Thorsteinsson (performed by The Wallflowers); "Virtual Insanity" – Jonathan Glazer and John McManus (performed by Jamiroquai)	
1998	Jonas Åkerlund	"Ray of Light" (performed by Madonna)	"I Don't Want to Miss a Thing" – Chris Hafner (performed by Aerosmith); "Push It" – Sylvain Connat (performed by Garbage); "Smack My Bitch Up" – Jonas Åkerlund (performed by The Prodigy)	
1999	Haines Hall and Michael Sachs	"Freak on a Leash" (performed by Korn)	"Believe" – Scott Richter (performed by Cher); "Changes" – Chris Hafner (performed by 2Pac); "No Scrubs" – Harvey White (performed by TLC)	

=== 2000s ===
Year	Winner(s)	Work	Nominees	Ref.
2000	Dylan Tichenor	"Save Me" (performed by Aimee Mann)	"The Great Beyond" – Igor Kovalik (performed by R.E.M.); "I Disappear" – Nathan Cox (performed by Metallica); "I Do" – Chris Hafner (performed by Blaque); "The Real Slim Shady" – Dan Lebental (performed by Eminem)	
2001	Eric Zumbrunnen	"Weapon of Choice" (performed by Fatboy Slim)	"Elevation (Tomb Raider Mix)" – Joseph Kahn (performed by U2); "Get Ur Freak On" – Scott Richter (performed by Missy Elliott); "Pop" – Chrome (performed by 'N Sync)	
2002	Mikros & Duran	"Fell in Love with a Girl" (performed by The White Stripes)	"Chop Suey!" – Nicholas Erasmus (performed by System of a Down); "Without Me" – Joseph Kahn (performed by Eminem); "One Minute Man" – Jay Robinson (performed by Missy Elliott featuring Ludacris and Trina)	
2003	Olivier Gajan	"Seven Nation Army" (performed by The White Stripes)	"Freetime" – Vem and Tony (performed by Kenna); "Hurt" – Robert Duffy (performed by Johnny Cash); "There There" – Ben Foley (performed by Radiohead); "Work It" – Chris Davis (performed by Missy Elliott)	
2004	Robert Duffy	"99 Problems" (performed by Jay-Z)	"Are You Gonna Be My Girl" – Megan Bee (performed by Jet); "The Hardest Button to Button" – Charlie Johnston, Geoff Hounsell and Andy Grieve (performed by The White Stripes); "Maps" – Anthony Cerniello (performed by Yeah Yeah Yeahs); "Perfect" – Declan Whitebloom (performed by Simple Plan)	
2005	Tim Royes	"Boulevard of Broken Dreams" (performed by Green Day)	"Best of You" – Nathan Cox (performed by Foo Fighters); "Get Right" – Dustin Robertson (performed by Jennifer Lopez); "Speed of Sound" – Adam Pertofsky (performed by Coldplay); "Untitled" – Richard Alarcon (performed by Simple Plan); "What You Waiting For?" – Dustin Robertson (performed by Gwen Stefani)	
2006	Ken Mowe	"Crazy" (performed by Gnarls Barkley)	"The Adventure" – Clark Eddy (performed by Angels & Airwaves); "Dani California" – Peter Goddard (performed by Red Hot Chili Peppers); "Move Along" – J.D. Smyth (performed by The All-American Rejects); "Original of the Species" – Olivier Wicki (performed by U2)	
2007	Ken Mowe	"Smiley Faces" (performed by Gnarls Barkley)	"Beautiful Liar" – Jarrett Fijal (performed by Beyoncé and Shakira); "Stronger" – Peter Johnson and Corey Weisz (performed by Kanye West); "What Goes Around... Comes Around" – Holle Singer (performed by Justin Timberlake); "What I've Done" – Igor Kovalik (performed by Linkin Park)	
2008	Aaron Stewart-Ahn and Jeff Buchanan	"I Will Possess Your Heart" (performed by Death Cab for Cutie)	"Closer" – Clark Eddy (performed by Ne-Yo); "Honey" – T. David Binns (performed by Erykah Badu); "I Kissed a Girl" – Tom Lindsay (performed by Katy Perry); "Pork and Beans" – Jeff Consiglio and Colin Woods (performed by Weezer)	
2009	Jarrett Fijal	"Single Ladies (Put a Ring on It)" (performed by Beyoncé)	"7 Things" – Jarrett Fijal (performed by Miley Cyrus); "Circus" – Jarrett Fijal (performed by Britney Spears); "Paparazzi" – Danny Tull and Jonas Åkerlund (performed by Lady Gaga); "Viva la Vida" – Hype Williams (performed by Coldplay)	

=== 2010s ===
Year	Winner(s)	Work	Nominees	Ref.
2010	Jarrett Fijal	"Bad Romance" (performed by Lady Gaga)	"Animal" – Frank Macias (performed by Miike Snow); "Funhouse" – Chris Davis (performed by P!nk); "Not Afraid" – Ken Mowe (performed by Eminem); "Rude Boy" – Clark Eddy (performed by Rihanna)	
2011	Art Jones	"Rolling in the Deep" (performed by Adele)	"All of the Lights" – Hadaya Turner (performed by Kanye West featuring Rihanna and Kid Cudi); "E.T." – Jarrett Fijal (performed by Katy Perry featuring Kanye West); "Hurricane" – Jared Leto, Frank Snider, Michael Bryson, Stefanie Visser and Daniel Carberry (performed by Thirty Seconds to Mars); "Simple Math" – DANIELS (performed by Manchester Orchestra)	
2012	Alexander Hammer and Jeremiah Shuff (Note: No secondary sources for this year's awards mention the full details for "Best Editing" nominees/winners beyond the title of the winning music video/artist. The attached MTV category archive is the only place the editors names can be found.)	"Countdown" (performed by Beyoncé)	"Goldie" – Samantha Lecca (performed by ASAP Rocky); "Mercy" – Eric Greenburg (performed by Kanye West featuring Pusha T, Big Sean and 2 Chainz); "Paris" – Alexander Hammer, Peter Johnson and Derek Lee (performed by Jay-Z and Kanye West); "Somebody That I Used to Know" – Natasha Pincus (performed by Gotye featuring Kimbra)	
2013	Jarrett Fijal	"Mirrors" (performed by Justin Timberlake)	"Can't Hold Us" – Ryan Lewis and Jason Koenig (performed by Macklemore and Ryan Lewis featuring Ray Dalton); "Just Give Me a Reason" – Jacquelyn London (performed by P!nk featuring Nate Ruess); "Sweet Nothing" – Vincent Haycock and Ross Hallard (performed by Calvin Harris featuring Florence Welch); "We Can't Stop" – Paul Martinez and Nick Rondeau (performed by Miley Cyrus)	
2014	Ken Mowe	"Rap God" (performed by Eminem)	"Pretty Hurts" – Jeff Selis (performed by Beyoncé); "Stay the Night" – Daniel "Cloud" Campos (performed by Zedd featuring Hayley Williams); "The Walker" – James Fitzpatrick (performed by Fitz and the Tantrums); "Your Life Is a Lie" – Erik Laroi (performed by MGMT)	
2015	Beyoncé, Ed Burke and Jonathan Wing	"7/11" (performed by Beyoncé)	"Bad Blood" – Chancler Haynes (performed by Taylor Swift featuring Kendrick Lamar); "Don't" – Jacquelyn London (performed by Ed Sheeran); "LSD" – Dexter Navy (performed by ASAP Rocky); "Where Are Ü Now" – Brewer (performed by Skrillex and Diplo featuring Justin Bieber)	
2016	Jeff Selis	"Formation" (performed by Beyoncé)	"Hello" – Xavier Dolan (performed by Adele); "Into You" – Hannah Lux Davis (performed by Ariana Grande); "Lazarus" – Johan Söderberg (performed by David Bowie); "M.I.L.F. $" – Vinnie Hobbs (performed by Fergie)	
2017	Ryan Staake and Eric Degliomini	"Wyclef Jean" (performed by Young Thug)	"Closer" – Jennifer Kennedy (performed by The Chainsmokers featuring Halsey); "Green Light" – Nate Gross of Exile Edit (performed by Lorde); "Mask Off" – Vinnie Hobbs of VHPost (performed by Future); "Reminder" – Red Barbaza (performed by The Weeknd)	
2018	Taylor Ward	"Lemon" (performed by N.E.R.D and Rihanna)	"Apeshit" – Taylor Ward and Sam Ostrove (performed by The Carters); "Finesse (Remix)" – Jacquelyn London (performed by Bruno Mars featuring Cardi B); "Look What You Made Me Do" – Chancler Haynes for Cosmo (performed by Taylor Swift); "Make Me Feel" – Deji LaRay (performed by Janelle Monáe); "This is America" – Ernie Gilbert (performed by Childish Gambino)	
2019	Billie Eilish	"Bad Guy" (performed by Billie Eilish)	"7 Rings" – Hannah Lux Davis and Taylor Walsh (performed by Ariana Grande); "Almeda" – Solange Knowles, Vinnie Hobbs and Jonathon Proctor (performed by Solange); "Old Town Road (Remix)" – Calmatic (performed by Lil Nas X featuring Billy Ray Cyrus); "Tints" – Vinnie Hobbs (performed by Anderson .Paak featuring Kendrick Lamar); "You Need to Calm Down" – Jarrett Fijal (performed by Taylor Swift)	

=== 2020s ===
Year	Winner(s)	Work	Nominees	Ref.
2020	Alexandre Moors and Nuno Xico	"Mother's Daughter" (performed by Miley Cyrus)	"A Palé" – Andre Jones (performed by Rosalía); "Blinding Lights" – Janne Vartia and Tim Montana (performed by The Weeknd); "Can't Believe the Way We Flow" – Frank Lebon (performed by James Blake); "Good as Hell" – Russell Santos and Sofia Kerpan (performed by Lizzo); "Graveyard" – Emille Aubry, Janne Vartia and Tim Montana (performed by Halsey)	
2021	Troy Charbonnet	"Leave the Door Open" (performed by Silk Sonic, Bruno Mars and Anderson .Paak)	"Butter" – Yong Seok Choi (performed by BTS); "Peaches" – Mark Mayr, Vinnie Hobbs (performed by Justin Bieber featuring Daniel Caesar and Giveon); "Prisoner" – William Town (performed by Miley Cyrus featuring Dua Lipa); "Treat People with Kindness" – Claudia Wass (performed by Harry Styles); "What's Next" – Noah Kendal (performed by Drake)	
2022	Valentin Petit and Jon Echeveste	"Saoko" (performed by Rosalía)	"Family Ties" – Neal Farmer (performed by Baby Keem and Kendrick Lamar); "Get Into It (Yuh)" – Mike Diva (performed by Doja Cat); "Brutal" – Alyssa Oh from Rock Paper Scissors (performed by Olivia Rodrigo); All Too Well: The Short Film – Ted Guard (performed by Taylor Swift); "Take My Breath" – Nick Rondeau (performed by The Weeknd)	
2023	Sofia Kerpan and David Checel	"Vampire" (performed by Olivia Rodrigo)	"Anti-Hero" – Chancler Haynes (performed by Taylor Swift); "Kill Bill" – Luis Caraza Peimbert (performed by SZA); "Pink Venom" – Seo Hyun Seung (GIGANT) (performed by Blackpink); "Rich Spirit" – Grason Caldwell (performed by Kendrick Lamar); "River" – Brendan Walter (performed by Miley Cyrus)	
2024	Chancler Haynes	"Fortnight" (performed by Taylor Swift featuring Post Malone)	"Mil Veces" – Nick Yumul (performed by Anitta); "We Can't Be Friends (Wait for Your Love)" – Luis Caraza Peimbert (performed by Ariana Grande); "Houdini" – David Checel (performed by Eminem); "Rockstar" – Nik Kohler (performed by Lisa); "Espresso" – Jai Shukla (performed by Sabrina Carpenter)	
2025	William Town and Modern Post	"Just Keep Watching" (performed by Tate McRae)	"Abracadabra" – Sofia Kerpan (performed by Lady Gaga); "Guess" – Neal Farmer (performed by Charli XCX featuring Billie Eilish); "Manchild" – Vania Heymann, Gal Muggia and Nick Rondeau (performed by Sabrina Carpenter); "Not Like Us" – Chaz Smedley and Eddy Street Post (performed by Kendrick Lamar); "Sapphire" – Liam Pethick (performed by Ed Sheeran)	
2026	Sofia Kerpan at Modern Post	"House Tour" (performed by Sabrina Carpenter)	Confessions II – The Film – Will Town, Lauren Friedman and Danny Tull (performed by Madonna); "Dream" – Kwon O-jun (performed by Lisa featuring Kentaro Sakaguchi); "Hate That I Made You Love Me" – Luis Caraza Peimbert (performed by Ariana Grande); "I Just Might" – Daniel Ramos (performed by Bruno Mars); "The Fate of Ophelia" – Chancler Haynes (performed by Taylor Swift)	

== Editor Statistics ==
=== Multiple wins ===
3 wins

- Jarrett Fijal
- Ken Mowe

2 wins

- Eric Zumbrunnen
- Jim Haygood
- Robert Duffy
- Sofia Kerpan

=== Multiple nominations ===
8 nominations

- Jarrett Fijal

7 nominations

- Robert Duffy

6 nominations

- Jim Haygood

5 nominations

- Chancler Haynes
- Vinnie Hobbs

4 nominations

- David Yardley
- Eric Zumbrunnen
- Ken Mowe
- Sofia Kerpan

3 nominations

- Chris Hafner
- Clark Eddy
- Jacquelyn London
- Jonas Åkerlund
- Luis Caraza Peimbert
- Nick Rondeau
- Scott Chestnut

2 nominations

- Alexander Hammer
- Chris Davis
- Danny Tull
- David Checel
- Dustin Robertson
- Godley & Creme
- Hal Honigsberg
- Hannah Lux Davis
- Igor Kovalik
- Janne Vartia
- Jay Torres
- Jeff Selis
- Nathan Cox
- Neal Farmer
- Olivier Gajan
- Pat Sheffield
- Peter Johnson
- Richard Uber
- Roo Aiken
- Scott Richter
- Sim Sadler
- Steve Purcell
- Taylor Ward
- Tim Montana
- William Town

== Artist Statistics ==
=== Multiple wins ===
4 wins

- Beyoncé (Note: 1 also as co-editor.)

2 wins

- Gnarls Barkley
- Madonna
- Peter Gabriel
- R.E.M.
- The White Stripes

=== Multiple nominations ===
7 nominations

- Beyoncé (Note: 1 also as co-editor; 1 with The Carters.)
- Taylor Swift

5 nominations

- Eminem
- Kanye West (Note: 1 as a featured artist.)
- Kendrick Lamar (Note: 2 as a featured artist.)
- Miley Cyrus

4 nominations

- Ariana Grande
- Madonna
- R.E.M.
- U2

3 nominations

- Aerosmith
- Bruno Mars
- Jay-Z (Note: 1 with The Carters.)
- Lady Gaga
- Missy Elliott
- Peter Gabriel
- Red Hot Chili Peppers
- Rihanna (Note: 1 as a featured artist.)
- Sabrina Carpenter
- The Smashing Pumpkins
- The Weeknd
- The White Stripes
- ZZ Top

2 nominations

- Adele
- Anderson .Paak
- ASAP Rocky
- Beck
- Billie Eilish (Note: 1 also as editor; 1 as a featured artist.)
- Billy Idol
- Coldplay
- Ed Sheeran
- Eurythmics
- Gnarls Barkley
- Green Day
- Halsey (Note: 1 as a featured artist.)
- INXS
- Justin Bieber (Note: 1 as a featured artist.)
- Justin Timberlake
- Katy Perry
- Lindsey Buckingham
- Lisa
- Metallica
- Michael Jackson
- Olivia Rodrigo
- Pink
- Rosalía
- Simple Plan
- Steve Winwood
- TLC
- Weezer
