= Seeds We Sow =

Studio album by Lindsey Buckingham
- Released: September 6, 2011
- Genre: Rock
- Length: 38:42 (standard edition)
- Labels: Mind Kit Records, Eagle Rock Entertainment, Back On Black
- Producer: Lindsey Buckingham

Lindsey Buckingham chronology
Gift of Screws (2008)	Seeds We Sow (2011)	Songs from the Small Machine: Live in L.A. (2011)

Singles from Seeds We Sow
- 1. "Seeds We Sow" Released: June 29, 2011 (digital download); 2. "In Our Own Time" Released: 2011; 3. "When She Comes Down" Released: 2011 (UK); 4. "End of Time" Released: 2011

Seeds We Sow is the sixth solo album by American musician and Fleetwood Mac vocalist-guitarist Lindsey Buckingham, released on September 6, 2011. It is his first to be self-released, having been distributed by Mind Kit Records after his solo deal with Warner Records had lapsed. It debuted and peaked at No. 45 on the US Billboard 200 chart, which tied Go Insane as his second highest charting album on that listing.

== Background ==
Work on the album began after the completion of Fleetwood Mac's Unleashed tour. Fleetwood Mac had considered adding additional dates after concluding the New Zealand leg of the tour, but they ultimately decided against it, leaving Buckingham with more time than he anticipated. As such, he decided to use the opportunity to work on a new album. Unlike his previous two albums, Buckingham entered the recording studio without many fully fleshed out songs and lacked an overarching agenda on how to approach the material. He spent roughly one year working on Seeds We Sow at his home studio, where he also served as the album's producer and audio engineer.

Buckingham compared the creative process of working on Seeds We Sow to painting, which he contrasted to the more deliberative process of making a band album to moviemaking. He explained that with Seeds We Sow he did not obligated to present a complete song to a band that would then heavily scrutinize it and then attempt to heavily rework it to fit the perceived needs of the band. He said that he approached his solo work in the same way an artist "might just star slapping color on the canvas without knowing where it's going", and then letting these decisions dictate the direction of the material.

== Composition and recording ==
With the exception of "She Smiled Sweetly", a Rolling Stones cover, every song on the album was either written or co-written by Buckingham. "I wrote them out as snippets of ideas right before I went in to start the actual recording. 'She Smiled Sweetly' was the only thing I had recorded previously; it had been sitting around for a while, waiting to find a home. It seemed somehow appropriate to end the album with it." Another song on the album, "In Our Own Time", was written about Buckingham's relationship with his wife, Kristen.

Buckingham wrote "Illumination" after being approached to create a song that would play over the credit sequence of a television show. His submission consisted of the song's opening arpeggio, which segued into a verse, chorus, and a final arpeggio, resulting in a total run-time between 35 and 45 seconds. The television show rejected the submission, so Buckingham returned to the song a few months later and finished it for Seeds We Sow.

Some of the lyrics to "Stars Are Crazy" derived from the song "With You on My Mind" by Lisa Dewey, who first played the song for Buckingham backstage during his 2006 performance at the Palace of Fine Arts. Buckingham then built a new instrumental arrangement around those lyrics with the intention of including the reworked song on Seeds We Sow. His manager contacted Dewey for permission to use her lyrics, although she was unsatisfied with the original terms established and reached out to Michael Steele for assistance. Steele redirected her to Michael O. Crain, who settled on an agreement more favorable to Dewey. Crain, who had previously represented the estates of Jerry Garcia, John Lennon and Bob Marley, secured performance and mechanical royalties for Dewey on "Stars Are Crazy" along with a writing credit.

Buckingham said that the lyrics on the title track examined the overlap between the dynamics of relationships and contemporary global events. He also mentioned that the fingerpicking on the title track was a continuation of his approach to the acoustic rendition of "Big Love", saying that he wanted this guitar technique to be "one of the mainstays of my style." "That's the Way Love Goes" is the only song on the album to feature musicians other than Buckingham credited in the liner notes, with Brett Tuggle, Neale Heywood, Walfredo Reyes Jr. contributing keyboards, bass, and drums respectively. All three had served as members of Buckingham's touring band.

== Release ==
Buckingham had previewed six songs from his Seeds We Sow album on April 22, 2011 during a performance at the Saban Theater. On June 13, 2011, Billboard announced that "In Our Own Time" would be the first single from Seeds We Sow. That same month, the title track was made available as a free download. "When She Comes Down" was released in the UK via digital download and "End of Time" was serviced to radio stations as a promotional release.

Seeds We Sow was the first album that Buckingham released independently. He first considered continuing with Warner Records, which had handled the distribution of some of his previous records until his deal with the label expired. Rob Cavallo, who was the chairman of Warner Bros and had worked with Buckingham in the past, was initially receptive to the idea of releasing Seeds We Sow through the label. Buckingham mentioned that when he followed up with Cavallo on the matter on the phone, Cavallo "started talking about the numbers he had to make quarterly, and I thought, 'Well, that's the end of that'". Buckingham also believed that Warner Records was more interested in prioritizing a Fleetwood Mac album rather than another solo album.

By April 2011, Buckingham had still not decided how to release the album. After he approached some independent labels, Buckingham concluded that it would be feasible for to handle the album's release himself. To that end, Buckingham created the record label Mind Kit Records for the album's release. When explaining the name for Mind Kit Records, Buckingham explained that "the label name had to be that off-the-wall to ensure it hadn't been taken."

Seeds We Sow entered the Billboard 200 during the week of September 24, 2011 with 9,000 units sold. By reaching number 45, Seeds We Sow ties with 1984's Go Insane as Buckingham's second highest-charting album after his 1981 debut Law and Order. It also reached number 6 on the Billboard Rock Album Chart and number 5 on the Billboard Independent Albums Chart. The album was released physically on CD as an eleven-track album with an additional three tracks available as a digital download. It was also released as a limited-edition 180-gram red vinyl gatefold 2×LP via Back On Black records. The iTunes edition of the album also included the song "Sleeping Around the Corner", which was later included on the 2017 Lindsey Buckingham Christine McVie album.

== Reception ==
Professional ratings
Review scores
Source	Rating
AllMusic	4/5 stars
American Songwriter	3/4 stars
Chicago Tribune	3.5/4 stars
PopMatters	7/10 stars
Rolling Stone	3/5 stars
USA Today	3/4 stars

At Metacritic, which assigns a weighted average rating out of 100 to reviews from mainstream publications, the album received a score of 73 based on 13 reviews. Thom Jurek of AllMusic thought that Seeds We Sow was "different from anything we've heard from him before, even if his musical and lyrical signatures are all over it; they pick up where Gift of Screws left off". Jason Heller wrote in The A.V. Club that "Buckingham elicits gooseflesh for the right reasons. "Illumination" is a sharp, accusatory screed that vibrates like a Tusk outtake, and "In Our Own Time" wrings sorcery out of Buckingham's signature finger-picked arpeggios and haunted swathes of harmony."

Los Angeles Times commented that "like all of the singer-guitarist’s own work, Seeds We Sow is thornier than Buckingham’s material for Fleetwood Mac, with an emphasis on his percussive, sometimes-discordant acoustic guitar playing and on his intimately recorded vocals." Rolling Stone was more critical, saying that "the recording suffers from thin, uneven sound and, on tracks like "Stars Are Crazy", a surfeit of muddling reverb". Record Collector contrasted the "sparse feel" of the album's first half with the "more satisfying" second half and labelled "One Take" as "the most ear-catching." USA Today called the album "both intricate and supremely listenable."

== Track listing ==
All tracks written by Lindsey Buckingham except where stated.

No.	Title	Length
1.	"Seeds We Sow"	3:43
2.	"In Our Own Time"	4:20
3.	"Illumination"	2:19
4.	"That's the Way That Love Goes"	3:56
5.	"Stars Are Crazy" (Lindsey Buckingham, Lisa Dewey)	4:50
6.	"When She Comes Down"	4:48
7.	"Rock Away Blind"	3:57
8.	"One Take"	3:28
9.	"Gone Too Far"	3:24
10.	"End of Time"	3:57
11.	"She Smiled Sweetly" (Mick Jagger, Keith Richards)	2:53

Extra tracks
No.	Title	Length
12.	"End of Time (live)" (Amazon MP3 download)	4:12
13.	"Seeds We Sow (electric)" (Amazon MP3 download)	3:57
14.	"Sleeping Around the Corner" (iTunes download)	3:33

== Personnel ==
=== Musicians ===
- Lindsey Buckingham – vocals, guitars, bass, keyboards, percussion, programming
- Brett Tuggle – keyboards (4)
- Neale Heywood – bass (4)
- Walfredo Reyes, Jr. – drums (4)
- Kristen Buckingham – sequencing

=== Production ===
- Lindsey Buckingham – producer, recording, mixing
- Stephen Marcussen – mastering at Marcussen Mastering (Hollywood, California)
- Stewart Whitmore – digital editing
- Jeri Heiden – art direction
- Nick Steinhardt – design
- Jeremy Cowart – photography
- Tom Consolo – management (for Front Line)
- Irving Azoff – management (for Front Line)
- Buckingham Records LLC

== Charts ==
Chart (2011)	Peak position
Norwegian Albums (VG-lista)	28
Scottish Albums (Official Charts)	95
UK Albums (Official Charts)	82
UK Independent Albums (Official Charts)	12
US Billboard 200	45
US Independent Albums (Billboard)	5
US Top Rock Albums (Billboard)	6
US Indie Store Album Sales (Billboard)	9
