= Slow Dancing (Lindsey Buckingham song) =

Single by Lindsey Buckingham

from the album Go Insane
- B-side: "D.W. Suite"
- Released: November 9, 1984
- Genre: Rock; new wave
- Length: 4:05
- Label: Reprise; Warner Music Group
- Songwriter: Lindsey Buckingham
- Producers: Lindsey Buckingham; Gordon Fordyce

Lindsey Buckingham US singles chronology
"Go Insane" (1984)	"Slow Dancing" (1984)	"Wrong" (1992)

Lindsey Buckingham UK singles chronology
"Go Insane" (1984)	"Slow Dancing" (1984)	"Countdown" (1992)

"Slow Dancing" is a track on Lindsey Buckingham's second solo album, Go Insane. Despite receiving power rotation on MTV, "Slow Dancing" failed to make the Billboard Hot 100, although it did reach number 6 on the Bubbling Under Hot 100 Singles, an extension to the Hot 100. 34 years after its release, "Slow Dancing" was performed live for the first time.

"Slow Dancing" possesses a 4/4 dance beat and has a heavy reliance on computer sounds, particularly from the 8 bit Fairlight CMI. Buckingham said in a 2018 interview with Stereogum that "Slow Dancing" explores the idea of striving for human connection through romantic aspirations. Early in the song's development, Buckingham had the idea of concluding "Slow Dancing" with a classical-inspired 3/4 waltz, and this concept was ultimately kept in the final version of the song.

== Critical reception ==
Several months before "Slow Dancing" was released as a single, the Los Angeles Times earmarked the song as Go Insane's "best shot at the charts". Billboard described "Slow Dancing" as a "new bit of creative insanity" and wrote that the song's "lurching dance beat is set in a mix that goes to unsettling extremes." Rolling Stone commented that "Slow Dancing's "whipcrack backbeat kicks "Slow Dancing" out of the living room and onto the dance floor where it belongs."

== Music video ==
Similar to "Go Insane", the video for "Slow Dancing" was shot in England and the video's special effects were done by David Yardley. Buckingham thought that the filming for "Slow Dancing" was more elaborate than music video for "Trouble", particularly in regards to the number of shots, rhythm of the editing, and the use of effects. The video for "Slow Dancing" was released to MTV on November 17, 1984. In 1985, "Slow Dancing" was nominated for three awards at the 1985 MTV Video Music Awards: Most Experimental Video, Best Special Effects in a Video, and Best Editing in a Video, although it did not win any of these categories.

=== Accolades ===
Year	Nominee / work	Award	Result
1985	MTV Award	Best Special Effects in a Video	Nominated
1985	MTV Award	Best Editing in a Video	Nominated
1985	MTV Award	Most Experimental Video	Nominated

== Personnel ==
- Lindsey Buckingham – all instruments, vocals

== Chart performance ==
Chart (1984)	Peak position
US Billboard Bubbling Under Hot 100 Singles	6
