= Thirlaway =

Thirlaway is a surname. Notable people with the surname include:

- Billy Thirlaway (1896–1983), English footballer
- Hal Thirlaway (1917–2009), British seismologist
- Simon Thirlaway, British cinematographer
