= MTV Video Music Award for Best Cinematography =

Annual music video award

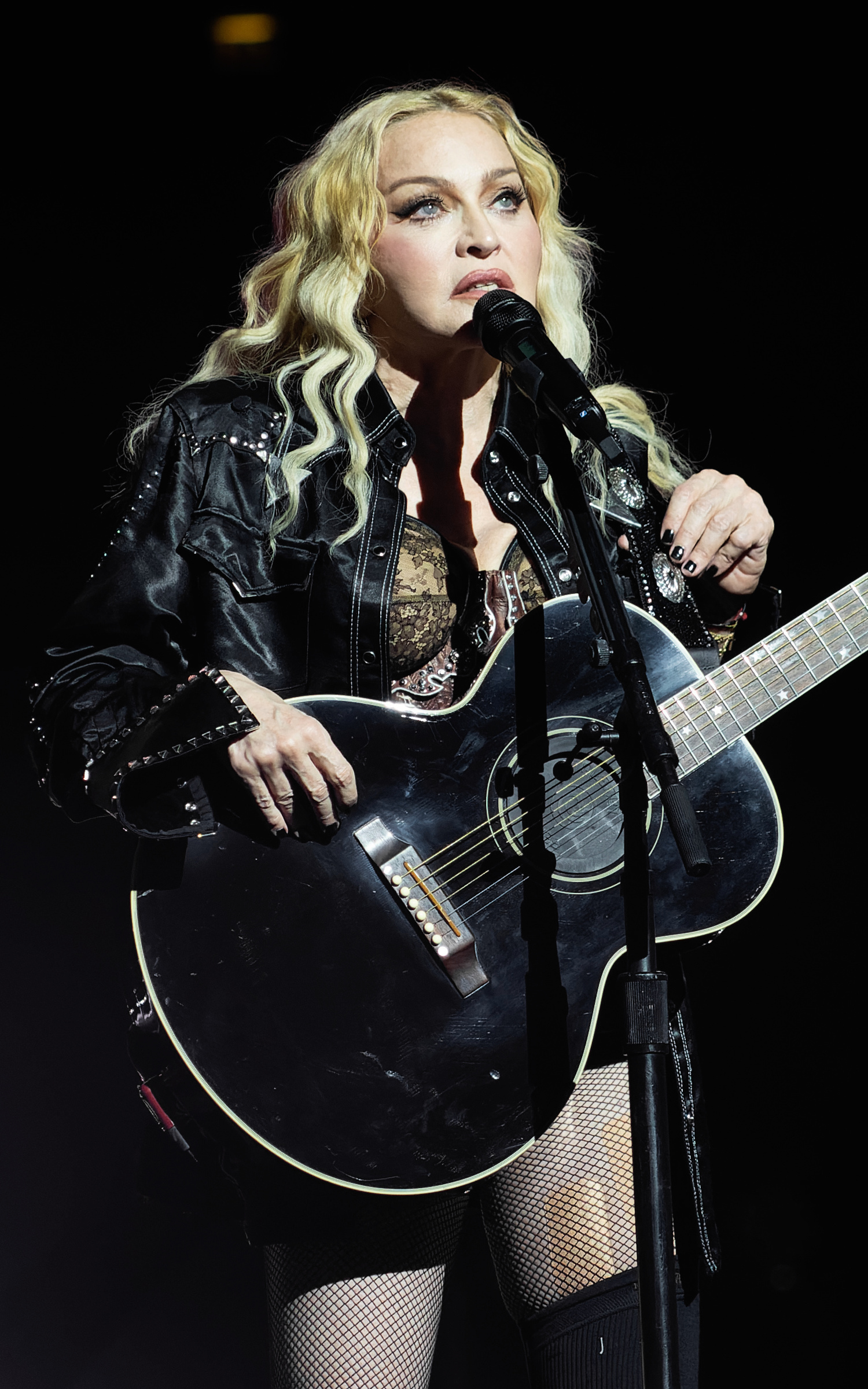
- Madonna (pictured) & Daniel Landin are the most recent recipients for Confessions II – The Film
- Awarded for: Cinematography
- Country: United States
- Presented by: MTV
- First award: 1984
- Currently held by: Daniel Landin – Confessions II – The Film by Madonna (2026)

Highlights
- Most wins: Beyoncé (4); Harris Savides (3)
- Most nominations: Madonna (11); Daniel Pearl (9)
- Website: VMA website

The MTV Video Music Award for Best Cinematography is a craft award given to both the artist as well as the cinematographer/director of photography of the music video.

From 1984 to 2006, the award's full name was Best Cinematography in a Video. After a brief absence in 2007, the category acquired its current, shortened name in 2008.

The biggest winner is Harris Savides with three wins. Pascal Lebègue, Daniel Pearl, Mark Plummer, and Scott Cunningham follow with two wins each. The most nominated director of photography is Daniel Pearl with nine nominations, followed by Jeff Cronenweth with seven. Beyoncé has won the most awards in this category with four wins. Madonna's videos have received the most nominations with eleven. Ryan Lewis is also the only performer to have won a Moonman in this category for his work as a director of photography on the video for "Can't Hold Us" in 2013. Jared Leto ("Hurricane") is the only other performer to have been nominated for his work in this category.

== Recipients ==
=== 1980s ===
Year	Winner(s)	Work	Nominees	Ref.
1984	Daniel Pearl	"Every Breath You Take" (performed by The Police)	"All Hell's Breakin' Loose" – Tony Mitchell and Jim Crispi (performed by Kiss); "Authority Song" – Daniel Pearl (performed by John Cougar Mellencamp); "China Girl" – John Metcalfe (performed by David Bowie); "Eyes Without a Face" – Tony Mitchell (performed by Billy Idol); "(She's) Sexy + 17" – Harry Lake (performed by Stray Cats)	
1985	Pascal Lebègue	"The Boys of Summer" (performed by Don Henley)	"Go Insane" – Oliver Stapleton (performed by Lindsey Buckingham); "Heaven (version 2)" – Peter MacDonald (performed by Bryan Adams); "Like a Virgin" – Peter Sinclair (performed by Madonna); "Run to You" – Frank Gell (performed by Bryan Adams)	
1986	Oliver Stapleton	"The Sun Always Shines on T.V." (performed by a-ha)	"Burning House of Love" – Ken Barrows (performed by X); "The Confessor" – Jan Kiesser and Ken Barrows (performed by Joe Walsh); "Rough Boy" – Chris Nibley (performed by ZZ Top); "Sex as a Weapon" – Peter Mackay (performed by Pat Benatar)	
1987	Mark Plummer	"C'est la Vie" (performed by Robbie Nevil)	"Higher Love" – Peter Kagan (performed by Steve Winwood); "Papa Don't Preach" – Michael Ballhaus (performed by Madonna); "What's Going On" – Juan Ruiz Anchía (performed by Cyndi Lauper); "With or Without You" – Daniel Pearl and Matt Mahurin (performed by U2)	
1988	Bill Pope	"We'll Be Together" (performed by Sting)	"Father Figure" – Peter Mackay (performed by George Michael); "Heaven Knows" – Steve Tickner (performed by Robert Plant); "Learning to Fly" – Gordon Minard (performed by Pink Floyd); "Luka" – Dariusz Wolski (performed by Suzanne Vega)	
1989	Mark Plummer	"Express Yourself" (performed by Madonna)	"Roll with It" – Mark Plummer (performed by Steve Winwood); "Smooth Criminal" – John Hora (performed by Michael Jackson); "Twist in My Sobriety" – Jeff Darling (performed by Tanita Tikaram)	

=== 1990s ===
Year	Winner(s)	Work	Nominees	Ref.
1990	Pascal Lebègue	"Vogue" (performed by Madonna)	"The End of the Innocence" – David Bridges (performed by Don Henley); "Janie's Got a Gun" – Dariusz Wolski (performed by Aerosmith); "We Didn't Start the Fire" – Sven Kirsten (performed by Billy Joel)	
1991	Rolf Kestermann	"Wicked Game (Concept)" (performed by Chris Isaak)	"Freedom! '90" – Mike Southon (performed by George Michael); "Losing My Religion" – Larry Fong (performed by R.E.M.); "Mama Said Knock You Out" – Stephen Ashley Blake (performed by LL Cool J)	
1992	Mike Southon and Daniel Pearl	"November Rain" (performed by Guns N' Roses)	"Enter Sandman" – Martin Coppen (performed by Metallica); "Give It Away" – Marco Mazzei (performed by Red Hot Chili Peppers); "Good Vibrations" – Dave Phillips (performed by Marky Mark and the Funky Bunch); "Holiday (Truth or Dare version)" – Toby Phillips (performed by Madonna); "I Can't Dance" – Daniel Pearl (performed by Genesis); "In the Closet" – Rolf Kestermann (performed by Michael Jackson); "My Lovin' (You're Never Gonna Get It)" – Paul Lauter (performed by En Vogue); "Running Back to You" – Ralph Ziman (performed by Vanessa Williams); "Silent All These Years" – George Tiffin (performed by Tori Amos); "Tears in Heaven (Performance)" – David Johnson (performed by Eric Clapton)	
1993	Harris Savides	"Rain" (performed by Madonna)	"Constant Craving" – Marc Reshovsky (performed by k.d. lang); "Free Your Mind" – Thomas Kloss (performed by En Vogue); "If I Ever Lose My Faith in You" – Ivan Bartos (performed by Sting); "Ordinary World" – Martin Coppen (performed by Duran Duran)	
1994	Harris Savides	"Everybody Hurts" (performed by R.E.M.)	"Amazing" – Gabriel Beristain (performed by Aerosmith); "Heart-Shaped Box" – John Mathieson (performed by Nirvana); "Sweet Lullaby" – Tarsem and Denise Milford (performed by Deep Forest)	
1995	Garry Waller and Michael Trim	"Love Is Strong" (performed by The Rolling Stones)	"Basket Case" – Adam Beckman (performed by Green Day); "Interstate Love Song" – Kevin Kerslake (performed by Stone Temple Pilots); "Scream" – Harris Savides (performed by Michael Jackson and Janet Jackson); "Water Runs Dry" – Daniel Pearl (performed by Boyz II Men); "Waterfalls" – Toby Phillips (performed by TLC)	
1996	Declan Quinn	"Tonight, Tonight" (performed by The Smashing Pumpkins)	"Brokenhearted" – Martin Coppen (performed by Brandy featuring Wanya Morris); "Change the World" – Peter Nydrle and Marco Mazzei (performed by Eric Clapton); "You'll See" – Adrian Wild (performed by Madonna)	
1997	Stephen Keith-Roach	"Virtual Insanity" (performed by Jamiroquai)	"The End Is the Beginning Is the End" – Declan Quinn (performed by The Smashing Pumpkins); "Novocaine for the Soul" – Jeff Cronenweth (performed by Eels); "The Perfect Drug" – Jeff Cronenweth (performed by Nine Inch Nails)	
1998	Harris Savides	"Criminal" (performed by Fiona Apple)	"Don't Drink the Water" – Checco Varese (performed by Dave Matthews Band); "Karma Police" – Stephen Keith-Roach (performed by Radiohead); "Push It" – Max Malkin (performed by Garbage); "Ray of Light" – Henrik Halvarsson (performed by Madonna)	
1999	Martin Coppen	"The Dope Show" (performed by Marilyn Manson)	"Beautiful Stranger" – Thomas Kloss (performed by Madonna); "Freak on a Leash" – Julian Whatley (performed by Korn); "Malibu" – Martin Coppen (performed by Hole); "Miami" – Daniel Pearl (performed by Will Smith)	

=== 2000s ===
Year	Winner(s)	Work	Nominees	Ref.
2000	Jeff Cronenweth	"Do Something" (performed by Macy Gray)	"American Pie" – John Mathieson (performed by Madonna); "I Disappear" – David Rudd (performed by Metallica); "Sour Girl" – Martin Coppen (performed by Stone Temple Pilots); "Take a Picture" – Daniel Pearl (performed by Filter)	
2001	Lance Acord	"Weapon of Choice" (performed by Fatboy Slim)	"Get Ur Freak On" – James Hawkinson (performed by Missy Elliott); "Jaded" – Thomas Kloss (performed by Aerosmith); "Stan" – Dariusz Wolski (performed by Eminem featuring Dido)	
2002	Brad Rushing	"We Are All Made of Stars" (performed by Moby)	"One Minute Man" – Karsten "Crash" Gopinath (performed by Missy Elliott featuring Ludacris and Trina); "Whenever, Wherever" – Pascal Lebègue (performed by Shakira); "A Woman's Worth" – John Perez (performed by Alicia Keys)	
2003	Jean-Yves Escoffier	"Hurt" (performed by Johnny Cash)	"There There" – Fred Reed (performed by Radiohead); "Underneath It All" – Karsten "Crash" Gopinath (performed by No Doubt featuring Lady Saw); "Work It" – Michael Bernard (performed by Missy Elliott)	
2004	Joaquín Baca-Asay	"99 Problems" (performed by Jay-Z)	"It's My Life" – Jeff Cronenweth (performed by No Doubt); "Maps" – Shawn Kim (performed by Yeah Yeah Yeahs); "Naughty Girl" – James Hawkinson (performed by Beyoncé); "The Voice Within" – Jeff Cronenweth (performed by Christina Aguilera)	
2005	Samuel Bayer	"Boulevard of Broken Dreams" (performed by Green Day)	"Blue Orchid" – Chris Soos (performed by The White Stripes); "Ocean Breathes Salty" – Danny Hiele (performed by Modest Mouse); "Speed of Sound" – Harris Savides (performed by Coldplay); "Untitled" – Michael Bernard (performed by Simple Plan); "Vertigo" – Omer Ganai (performed by U2)	
2006	Robbie Ryan	"You're Beautiful" (performed by James Blunt)	"Black Sweat" – Checco Varese (performed by Prince); "Dani California" – Tony Kaye (performed by Red Hot Chili Peppers); "Invisible" – Jeff Cutter (performed by Ashlee Simpson); "Miss Murder" – Welles Hackett (performed by AFI)	
2007	—N/a			
2008	Wyatt Troll	"Conquest" (performed by The White Stripes)	"Honey" – Karsten "Crash" Gopinath (performed by Erykah Badu); "I Kissed a Girl" – Simon Thirlaway (performed by Katy Perry); "I Will Possess Your Heart" – Aaron Stewart-Ahn and Shawn Kim (performed by Death Cab for Cutie); "When I Grow Up" – Christopher Probst (performed by The Pussycat Dolls)	
2009	Jonathan Sela	"21 Guns" (performed by Green Day)	"Circus" – Thomas Kloss (performed by Britney Spears); "Paparazzi" – Eric Broms (performed by Lady Gaga); "Single Ladies (Put a Ring on It)" – Jim Fealy (performed by Beyoncé); "Viva la Vida" – John Perez (performed by Coldplay)	

=== 2010s ===
Year	Winner(s)	Work	Nominees	Ref.
2010	John Perez	"Empire State of Mind" (performed by Jay-Z featuring Alicia Keys)	"Bad Romance" – Thomas Kloss (performed by Lady Gaga); "Dog Days Are Over" – Adam Frisch (performed by Florence and the Machine); "Little Lion Man" – Ben Magahy (performed by Mumford & Sons); "Not Afraid" – Christopher Probst (performed by Eminem)	
2011	Tom Townend	"Rolling in the Deep" (performed by Adele)	"Hurricane" – Benoît Debie, Jared Leto, Rob Witt and Daniel Carberry (performed by Thirty Seconds to Mars); "Love the Way You Lie" – Christopher Probst (performed by Eminem featuring Rihanna); "Run the World (Girls)" – Jeffrey Kimball (performed by Beyoncé); "Teenage Dream" – Paul Laufer (performed by Katy Perry)	
2012	André Chemetoff	"Bad Girls" (performed by M.I.A.)	"Born to Die" – André Chemetoff (performed by Lana Del Rey); "Princess of China" – Stéphane Vallée (performed by Coldplay featuring Rihanna); "Someone Like You" – David Johnson (performed by Adele); "Take Care" – Kasper Tuxen (performed by Drake featuring Rihanna)	
2013	Ryan Lewis, Jason Koenig and Mego Lin	"Can't Hold Us" (performed by Macklemore and Ryan Lewis featuring Ray Dalton)	"Ride" – Malik Sayeed (performed by Lana Del Rey); "Sacrilege" – Alexis Zabé (performed by Yeah Yeah Yeahs); "Tuna Melt" – TS Pfeffer and Robert McHugh (performed by A-Trak and Tommy Trash); "Up in the Air" – David Devlin (performed by Thirty Seconds to Mars)	
2014	Darren Lew and Jackson Hunt	"Pretty Hurts" (performed by Beyoncé)	"Afterlife" – Evan Prosofsky (performed by Arcade Fire); "City of Angels" – David Devlin (performed by Thirty Seconds to Mars); "Hate or Glory" – Michael Ragen (performed by Gesaffelstein); "West Coast" – Evan Prosofsky (performed by Lana Del Rey)	
2015	Larkin Seiple	"Never Catch Me" (performed by Flying Lotus featuring Kendrick Lamar)	"Bad Blood" – Christopher Probst (performed by Taylor Swift featuring Kendrick Lamar); "Left Hand Free" – Mike Simpson (performed by Alt-J); "Thinking Out Loud" – Daniel Pearl (performed by Ed Sheeran); "Two Weeks" – Justin Brown (performed by FKA Twigs)	
2016	Malik Sayeed	"Formation" (performed by Beyoncé)	"Hello" – André Turpin (performed by Adele); "I Wanna Know" – Corey Jennings (performed by Alesso); "Into You" – Paul Laufer (performed by Ariana Grande); "Lazarus" – Crille Forsberg (performed by David Bowie)	
2017	Scott Cunningham	"HUMBLE." (performed by Kendrick Lamar)	"Castle on the Hill" – Steve Annis (performed by Ed Sheeran); "Nobody Speak" – David Proctor (performed by DJ Shadow featuring Run the Jewels); "Now or Never" – Kristof Brandl (performed by Halsey); "Thunder" – Matthew Wise (performed by Imagine Dragons)	
2018	Benoît Debie	"Apeshit" (performed by The Carters)	"Growing Pains" – Pau Castejón (performed by Alessia Cara); "In My Blood" – Jonathan Sela (performed by Shawn Mendes); "No Tears Left to Cry" – Scott Cunningham (performed by Ariana Grande); "River" – Frank Mobilio and Patrick Meller (performed by Eminem featuring Ed Sheeran); "This is America" – Larkin Seiple (performed by Childish Gambino)	
2019	Scott Cunningham	"Señorita" (performed by Shawn Mendes and Camila Cabello)	"Almeda" – Chayse Irvin, Ryan Helfant, and Justin Hamilton (performed by Solange); "hostage" – Pau Castejón (performed by Billie Eilish); "Me!" – Starr Whitesides (performed by Taylor Swift featuring Brendon Urie of Panic! at the Disco); "thank u, next" – Christopher Probst (performed by Ariana Grande); "Tints" – Elias Talbot (performed by Anderson .Paak featuring Kendrick Lamar)	

=== 2020s ===
Year	Winner(s)	Work	Nominees	Ref.
2020	Michael Merriman	"Rain on Me" (performed by Lady Gaga with Ariana Grande)	"all the good girls go to hell" – Christopher Probst (performed by Billie Eilish); "Blinding Lights" – Oliver Millar (performed by The Weeknd); "Harleys in Hawaii" – Arnau Valls (performed by Katy Perry); "My Oh My" – Scott Cunningham (performed by Camila Cabello featuring DaBaby); "Old Me" – Kieran Fowler (performed by 5 Seconds of Summer)	
2021	Benoit Soler, Malik H. Sayeed, Mohammaed Atta Ahmed, Santiago Gonzalez and Ryan Helfant	"Brown Skin Girl" (performed by Beyoncé, Blue Ivy, Saint Jhn and Wizkid)	"911" – Jeff Cronenweth (performed by Lady Gaga); "Holy" – Elias Talbot (performed by Justin Bieber featuring Chance the Rapper); "Shame Shame" – Santiago Gonzalez (performed by Foo Fighters); "Solar Power" – Andrew Stroud (performed by Lorde); "Therefore I Am" – Rob Witt (performed by Billie Eilish)	
2022	Nikita Kuzmenko	"As It Was" (performed by Harry Styles)	"Family Ties" – Bruce Cole (performed by Baby Keem and Kendrick Lamar); "Bam Bam" – David Bolen (performed by Camila Cabello featuring Ed Sheeran); "N95" – Adam Newport-Berra (performed by Kendrick Lamar); "Wild Side" – Nikita Kuzmenko (performed by Normani featuring Cardi B); All Too Well: The Short Film – Rina Yang (performed by Taylor Swift)	
2023	Rina Yang	"Anti-Hero" (performed by Taylor Swift)	"Count Me Out" – Adam Newport-Berra (performed by Kendrick Lamar); "Eyes Closed" – Natasha Braier (performed by Ed Sheeran); "Flowers" – Marcell Rév (performed by Miley Cyrus); "I Drink Wine" – Adam Newport-Berra (performed by Adele); "Lipstick Lover" – Allison Anderson (performed by Janelle Monáe); "Vampire" – Russ Fraser (performed by Olivia Rodrigo)	
2024	Anatol Trofimov	"We Can't Be Friends (Wait for Your Love)" (performed by Ariana Grande)	"Von Dutch" – Jeff Bierman (performed by Charli xcx); "Illusion" – Nikita Kuzmenko (performed by Dua Lipa); "Obsessed" – Marz Miller (performed by Olivia Rodrigo); "Touching the Sky" – Camilo Monsalve (performed by Rauw Alejandro); "Fortnight" – Rodrigo Prieto (performed by Taylor Swift & Post Malone)	
2025	Xiaolong Liu	"Not Like Us" (performed by Kendrick Lamar)	"Abracadabra" – Xiaolong Liu (performed by Lady Gaga); Brighter Days Ahead – Jeff Cronenweth (performed by Ariana Grande); "Easy Lover" – Benoît Debie (performed by Miley Cyrus); "Manchild" – Chris Ripley (performed by Sabrina Carpenter); "Sapphire" – Nic Minns (performed by Ed Sheeran)	
2026	Daniel Landin	Confessions II – The Film (performed by Madonna)	"Cowgirl" – Mitchell Mahar Perrin (performed by Shaboozey); "Dream" – Eumko (performed by Lisa featuring Kentaro Sakaguchi); "Hate That I Made You Love Me" – Janusz Kamiński (performed by Ariana Grande); "Punk Rocky" – Jake Gabbay (performed by A$AP Rocky); "The Fate of Ophelia" – Rodrigo Prieto (performed by Taylor Swift)	

== Cinematographer Statistics ==
=== Multiple wins ===
3 wins

- Harris Savides

2 wins

- Daniel Pearl
- Malik Sayeed
- Mark Plummer
- Pascal Lebègue
- Scott Cunningham

=== Multiple nominations ===
9 nominations

- Daniel Pearl

7 nominations

- Jeff Cronenweth

6 nominations

- Christopher Probst
- Martin Coppen

5 nominations

- Harris Savides
- Thomas Kloss

4 nominations

- Scott Cunningham

3 nominations

- Adam Newport-Berra
- Benoît Debie
- Dariusz Wolski
- John Perez
- Karsten "Crash" Gopinath
- Malik Sayeed
- Mark Plummer
- Nikita Kuzmenko
- Pascal Lebègue

2 nominations

- André Chemetoff
- Checco Varese
- David Devlin
- David Johnson
- Declan Quinn
- Elias Talbot
- Evan Prosofsky
- James Hawkinson
- John Mathieson
- Jonathan Sela
- Ken Barrows
- Larkin Seiple
- Marco Mazzei
- Michael Bernard
- Mike Southon
- Oliver Stapleton
- Pau Castejón
- Paul Laufer
- Peter Mackay
- Rina Yang
- Rob Witt
- Rodrigo Prieto
- Rolf Kestermann
- Ryan Helfant
- Santiago Gonzalez
- Shawn Kim
- Stephen Keith-Roach
- Toby Phillips
- Tony Mitchell
- Xiaolong Liu

== Artist Statistics ==
=== Multiple wins ===
4 wins

- Beyoncé (Note: 1 with The Carters.)
- Madonna

3 wins

- Jay-Z (Note: 1 with The Carters.)
- Kendrick Lamar (Note: 1 as a featured artist.)

2 wins

- Ariana Grande
- Green Day

=== Multiple nominations ===
11 nominations

- Madonna

8 nominations

- Kendrick Lamar (Note: 3 as a featured artist.)

7 nominations

- Ariana Grande
- Beyoncé (Note: 1 with The Carters.)

6 nominations

- Ed Sheeran (Note: 2 as a featured artist.)
- Taylor Swift

5 nominations

- Lady Gaga

4 nominations

- Adele
- Eminem

3 nominations

- Aerosmith
- Billie Eilish
- Camila Cabello
- Coldplay
- Green Day
- Jay-Z (Note: 1 with The Carters.)
- Katy Perry
- Lana Del Rey
- Michael Jackson
- Missy Elliott
- Rihanna (Note: 3 as a featured artist.)
- Thirty Seconds to Mars

2 nominations

- Alicia Keys
- Bryan Adams
- David Bowie
- Don Henley
- En Vogue
- Eric Clapton
- George Michael
- Metallica
- Miley Cyrus
- No Doubt
- Olivia Rodrigo
- Radiohead
- Red Hot Chili Peppers
- R.E.M.
- Shawn Mendes
- Steve Winwood
- Sting
- Stone Temple Pilots
- The Smashing Pumpkins
- The White Stripes
- U2
- Yeah Yeah Yeahs
