= Draco (song) =

Single by Future

from the album Future
- Released: February 21, 2017
- Recorded: 2016
- Genre: Hip hop; trap; cloud rap
- Length: 3:45
- Label: A1; Freebandz; Epic
- Songwriters: Nayvadius Wilburn; Gary Hill
- Producer: DJ Spinz

Future singles chronology
"Cold" (2017)	"Draco" (2017)	"Selfish" (2017)

"Draco" is a song by American rapper Future released as the lead single for his eponymous fifth studio album (2017). The song was written by him and was produced by DJ Spinz. The single peaked at number 46 on the US Billboard Hot 100.

== Critical reception ==
Sheldon Pearce of Pitchfork described the song as "Future is shooting a starter pistol in the air mid-victory lap". “Draco” refers to the Romanian pistol based on the AK-47 assault rifle.

== Chart performance ==
"Draco" debuted and peaked at number 46 on the US Billboard Hot 100 a week after release. It is the second highest-charting song taken from the album. On October 19, 2017, the song was certified platinum for combined sales and streaming equivalent units of over a million units in the United States.

== Charts ==
Chart (2017)	Peak position
Canada Hot 100 (Billboard)	62
US Billboard Hot 100	46
US Hot R&B/Hip-Hop Songs (Billboard)	17

== Certifications ==
Region	Certification	Certified units/sales
Canada (Music Canada)	Gold	40,000^{‡}
United States (RIAA)	Platinum	1,000,000^{‡}
^{‡} Sales+streaming figures based on certification alone.
