= Future (Future album) =

Studio album by Future
- Released: February 17, 2017
- Recorded: 2016
- Studios: Chalice (Los Angeles, CA); 11th Street (Atlanta, GA); Triangle Sounds Studio (Atlanta, GA); Jungle City (New York City, NY)
- Genres: Hip hop; trap
- Length: 62:47
- Labels: Freebandz; A1; Epic
- Producers: DJ Esco (exec.); Future (exec.); Chef Tate; DJ Khaled; DJ Spinz; Detail; DY; Fuse; Illmind; Jake One; Metro Boomin; Southside; Tarentino; The Beat Bully; The Olympicks; Tre Pounds; Zaytoven

Future chronology
Free Bricks 2: Zone 6 Edition (2016)	Future (2017)	Hndrxx (2017)

Singles from Future
- 1. "Draco" Released: February 21, 2017; 2. "Mask Off" Released: April 18, 2017; 3. "Extra Luv" Released: June 30, 2017

Future (stylized in all caps) is the fifth studio album by the American rapper Future. It was released on February 17, 2017, by A1 Recordings, Freebandz and Epic Records. The album features production by Metro Boomin, Zaytoven, DJ Khaled, The Beat Bully, Southside, alongside production from other members of 808 Mafia such as DY, Fuse, Tarentino and Tre Pounds. The album was supported by three singles: "Draco", "Mask Off" and "Extra Luv".

== Artwork ==
The artwork for Future was designed by famous artist Takashi Murakami. It shows Future, blurred in a haze of yellow smoke, while shaking his watch around.

== Background ==
The eponymously titled album was announced through social media on February 14, 2017. Future then followed up by posting on social media moments after.

== Singles ==
"Draco" was released as the first single from the album on February 21, 2017. The song debuted and peaked at number 46 on the Billboard Hot 100.

"Mask Off" was released as the second single on April 18, 2017. The song peaked at number five on the Billboard Hot 100.

"Extra Luv" was released as the third single on June 30, 2017, after being included as a streaming bonus track on the deluxe edition of the album. The single features a guest appearance from rapper YG.

The song "Used to This" featuring Drake, which was previously released as a single on November 4, 2016, was also included on the deluxe edition.

== Critical reception ==
Professional ratings
Aggregate scores
Source	Rating
AnyDecentMusic?	6.2/10
Metacritic	67/100
Review scores
Source	Rating
AllMusic	3.5/5 stars
Consequence of Sound	C
Exclaim!	8/10
HipHopDX	3.8/5
The Observer	3/5 stars
Pitchfork	7.3/10
Q	3/5 stars
Rolling Stone	3/5 stars
Spectrum Culture	3/5 stars
XXL	4/5

Future received positive reviews from critics. At Metacritic, which assigns a normalized rating out of 100 to reviews from mainstream publications, the album received an average score of 67, based on 15 reviews. Riley Wallace of Exclaim! wrote, "With exciting production that features his usual cast of ATL tastemakers who are (in some cases) paired with surprising co-producers like Jake One and !llmind, Future has crafted an opus full of bangers. So, while he doesn't break much new creative ground, there's a lot to love about Future." Jordan Sargent of Spin dubbed it "a clear return to form". Colin Groundwater for Pretty Much Amazing stated that "Future is too persistent. In striving for consistency, he sacrifices discretion and intention. One wishes he would take a break—God knows he's earned it. Some time might allow for a stronger sense of intention."

Writing for The Observer, Alex Macpherson concluded, "...[and] as a body of work, this album is neither an elevation over nor an advancement of his stream of recent material. At this point, merely shoring up his personal brand with scattered highlights means that Future is stuck in a holding pattern." Chase McMullen, an author for The 405, said, "In a genre that's hard on longevity, and an era with an even shorter attention span, Future has refused to lose, time and again. He certainly doesn't end here. Yet, after a year of baited breathing, we seem to have arrived at an in-between. There's still plenty of fun to be had in the waiting room, but let's hope he has more in store for the next appointment." Sheldon Pearce of Pitchfork, noted the album for being "...an ambitious Future exhibition" with "a pretty interesting array of textures, sonically."

== Commercial performance ==
Future debuted at number one on the Billboard 200 with 140,000 album-equivalent units, of which 60,000 were pure album sales. It became Future's fourth number-one album following DS2, What a Time to Be Alive with Drake, and Evol. As of September 27, 2017, the album has moved 902,000 album-equivalent units. On July 14, 2017, the album was certified Platinum by the Recording Industry Association of America (RIAA) for combined sales album-equivalent units of over a million units in the United States.

== Track listing ==
Future track listing
No.	Title	Writer(s)	Producer(s)	Length
1.	"Rent Money"	Nayvadius Wilburn; Khaled Khaled; Anthony Tucker; Jevon Tate; Maurice Jordan	The Beat Bully; Chef Tate; DJ Khaled^{[b]}	4:25
2.	"Good Dope"	Wilburn; Joshua Luellen	Southside	2:52
3.	"Zoom"	Wilburn; Luellen; Eduardo Earle, Jr.; Ramon Ibanga, Jr.	Southside; Fuse^{[a]}; Illmind^{[a]}	4:38
4.	"Draco"	Wilburn; Gary Hill	DJ Spinz	3:45
5.	"Super Trapper"	Wilburn; Luellen; Dwan Avery	Southside; DY	3:50
6.	"POA"	Wilburn; Luellen	Southside	4:08
7.	"Mask Off"	Wilburn; Leland Wayne; Tommy Butler	Metro Boomin	3:23
8.	"High Demand"	Wilburn; Avery; Jeffrey LaCroix	DY; Tre Pounds	3:31
9.	"Outta Time"	Wilburn; Luellen; Jacob Dutton	Southside; Jake One	2:48
10.	"Scrape"	Wilburn; Wayne	Metro Boomin	3:37
11.	"I'm So Groovy"	Wilburn; LaCroix; Chance Youngblood	Tarentino; Tre Pounds	4:21
12.	"Might As Well"	Wilburn; Youngblood; Edwin Butler; William Butler; Régine Chassagne; Jeremy Gara; Tim Kingsbury; Richard Parry; Owen Pallett	Tarentino	3:27
13.	"Poppin' Tags"	Wilburn; Luellen	Southside	3:38
14.	"Massage in My Room"	Wilburn; Luellen; Avery	Southside; DY	2:35
15.	"Flip"	Wilburn; Luellen; Hill	Southside; DJ Spinz	4:14
16.	"When I Was Broke"	Wilburn; Xavier Dotson	Zaytoven	3:05
17.	"Feds Did a Sweep"	Wilburn; Dotson	Zaytoven	4:30
Total length:				62:47

Streaming / LP Reissue
No.	Title	Writer(s)	Producer(s)	Length
18.	"Used to This" (featuring Drake)	Wilburn; Aubrey Graham; Dotson	Zaytoven	3:00
19.	"Mask Off" (remix featuring Kendrick Lamar)	Wilburn; Kendrick Duckworth; Butler; Wayne	Metro Boomin	4:18
20.	"Extra Luv" (featuring YG)	Wilburn; Keenon Jackson; Brian Wicker; Jesse James; David Stokes; Markiee Jones; Jeff Baranowski; Noel Fisher	Detail; The Olympicks	4:06
Total length:				74:00

Notes

- ^{^[a]} signifies a co-producer
- ^{^[b]} signifies an additional producer

Sample credits

- "Mask Off" contains samples of the song "Prison Song" by Tommy Butler.
- "Might As Well" contains sampled elements of the song "Owl", written by Edwin Butler, William Butler, Régine Chassagne, Jeremy Gara, Tim Kingsbury, Richard Parry and Owen Pallett, and performed by Arcade Fire.

== Personnel ==
Credits adapted from The Fader and Tidal.

Technical

- Joshua Sellers – recording (tracks 1, 2)
- Noah Shebib – recording (track 18)
- Noel Cadastre – recording (track 18)
- Eric Manco – mixing (tracks 1–12, 14–16, 17, 19), recording (tracks 5, 13–15)
- DJ Esco – mixing (tracks 1–12, 14–17, 19)
- Seth Firkins – mixing (tracks 1–19), recording (tracks 2–4, 6–12, 15–18, 19)
- Jaycen Joshua – mixing (track 20)
- Mike Symphony – mixing assistance (tracks 1–12, 14–17, 19)
- Phillip "Big Dockz" Cromwell – mixing assistance (tracks 1–12, 14–17, 19)
- David Nakaji – mixing assistance (track 20)
- Ivan Jimenez – mixing assistance (track 20)
- Glenn Schick – mastering (all tracks)

== Charts ==
=== Weekly charts ===
Chart (2017)	Peak position
Australian Albums (ARIA)	42
Australian Urban Albums (ARIA)	4
Belgian Albums (Ultratop Flanders)	80
Belgian Albums (Ultratop Wallonia)	105
Canadian Albums (Billboard)	1
Danish Albums (Hitlisten)	11
Dutch Albums (Album Top 100)	11
Finnish Albums (Suomen virallinen lista)	26
French Albums (SNEP)	43
German Albums (Offizielle Top 100)	53
New Zealand Albums (RMNZ)	33
Norwegian Albums (VG-lista)	15
Swedish Albums (Sverigetopplistan)	29
Swiss Albums (Schweizer Hitparade)	23
UK Albums (Official Charts)	15
US Billboard 200	1
US Top R&B/Hip-Hop Albums (Billboard)	1

Chart (2024)	Peak position
Nigerian Albums (TurnTable)	77

=== Year-end charts ===
Chart (2017)	Position
Canadian Albums (Billboard)	36
Danish Albums (Hitlisten)	50
US Billboard 200	15
US Top R&B/Hip-Hop Albums (Billboard)	8

Chart (2018)	Position
US Billboard 200	185

=== Decade-end charts ===
Chart (2010–2019)	Position
US Billboard 200	132

== Certifications ==
Region	Certification	Certified units/sales
Canada (Music Canada)	Platinum	80,000^{‡}
Denmark (IFPI Danmark)	Platinum	20,000^{‡}
Poland (ZPAV)	Platinum	20,000^{‡}
United Kingdom (BPI)	Silver	60,000^{‡}
United States (RIAA)	2× Platinum	2,000,000^{‡}
^{‡} Sales+streaming figures based on certification alone.

== Release history ==
Region	Format	Date	Label	Ref.
United States	CD; Digital Download	February 17, 2017	A1; Freebandz; Epic	
United Kingdom	CD; Digital Download	February 17, 2017	A1; Freebandz; Epic	
