= Go Insane =

1984 studio album by Lindsey Buckingham

Studio album by Lindsey Buckingham
- Released: July 30, 1984
- Recorded: 1984
- Studios: Cherokee Studios (Hollywood, Los Angeles); L. B.'s Garage
- Genres: Rock; new wave; synth-pop
- Length: 38:20
- Labels: Elektra; Warner Music Group
- Producers: Lindsey Buckingham; Gordon Fordyce

Lindsey Buckingham chronology
Law and Order (1981)	Go Insane (1984)	Out of the Cradle (1992)

Singles from Go Insane
- 1. "Go Insane" Released: July 1984; 2. "Slow Dancing" Released: November 1984

Go Insane is the second solo studio album by American rock musician Lindsey Buckingham, then the lead guitarist and male lead vocalist of Fleetwood Mac. The album was released on July 30, 1984, by Elektra Records and Warner Music Group, while Fleetwood Mac was on a hiatus between albums. It peaked at No. 45 on the U.S. Billboard 200 chart. Two promotional music videos were shot for the album. These include "Go Insane" and "Slow Dancing". Buckingham played all of the instruments on the album except for on "I Want You" and "Go Insane."

The album was dedicated to Buckingham's former girlfriend, Carol Ann Harris, with whom he had just ended a relationship. Harris commented that "Some of it makes me angry...sad. A lot of it is upsetting. But I think there's a lot of love there. It's hard for me to listen to it."

== Background ==
Conceptually, Go Insane centers around Buckingham's personal life at the time, particularly the dissolution of his romantic relationship with Carol Ann Harris. The two met during the making of Fleetwood Mac's Rumours album. Richard Dashut, who was a friend of Buckingham, described Buckingham's and Harris' relationship as "an intense one", saying that "they were both very much in love" and "saw things in a very serious way". Harris cited the rigors of fame and drug use as some of the reasons for their breakup.

Once Harris moved out of Buckingham's house, Buckingham began to assess the dynamics of romantic relationships, which informed his approach of writing the material on Go Insane. He explained is viewpoint that when a relationship "goes haywire, you’re going to go haywire with it", adding that "I think everyone goes insane from time to time. But usually you can reel yourself back in, usually you have a handle on what the context is. In other words, insanity is pretty relative."

== Recording ==
Buckingham began Go Insane on a 24 track machine in his garage, where he assembled a series of rough demos. He then temporarily shelved these recordings and waited for Richard Dashut, who had co-produced Buckingham's 1981 debut album, Law and Order, to complete work on Mick Fleetwood's I'm Not Me album. However, the I'm Not Me sessions lasted longer than anticipated, and Dashut declined Buckingham's offer, citing burnout. As such, Buckingham turned to Roy Thomas Baker, who at the time was the senior VP of worldwide production at Elektra Records. Baker was occupied with production work in England, so Buckingham flew overseas to send Baker the tapes himself. Of the dozen songs Buckingham showed to Baker, eight were entirely scrapped. The only four songs that eventually appeared on the final album were the title track, "Play in the Rain", "I Want You", and "I Must Go". Baker then paired Buckingham with Gordon Fordyce to finish the album.

Unlike Buckingham's previous studio album Law and Order, Go Insane did not include any acoustic drumming. Instead, he programmed the drums on a LinnDrum drum machine and Fairlight CMI sampling synthesizer. Buckingham obtained the instruments in the interim between Law and Order and Go Insane. He primarily used the LinnDrum to establish a metronomic beat and played the Fairlight by hand to overdub additional percussive elements. "I certainly can't play drums as well as a Linn can. If I wanted to play something myself, it was just as easy to do it on the Fairlight 'cause the sounds are already there and you don't have to set up a whole kit. Not only that, being able to play drums with two fingers cuts down considerably on the fatigue factor."

Buckingham started most of the songs with a programmed drum track and built upon them once he developed a more defined idea of what the finished product would be. His other equipment included a 1963 Fender Stratocaster, an Ovation acoustic guitar, and a Turner bass. Other than the Fairlight CMI, the only other keyboard that Buckingham played on Go Insane was an antique pump organ, which was used on "Bang the Drum". Around halfway through the sessions, Buckingham transferred production work from his home to Cherokee Studios, where most of the lead vocals were recorded. During this time, Buckingham was running low on available tracks on his Studer multi-track recorder, so he transferred his material to a Stephens 40-track machine that Roy Thomas Baker leased.

While Buckingham was pleased with the final results of Go Insane, deeming it superior to his first solo album, Law and Order, he remarked that "At times the songs are too dense and people have claimed, with a certain degree of relevance, that the arrangements are too busy. I used the Fairlight Computer on this one and it offers too many musical variations at the touch of a button, which may explain some of the LP’s more glaring faults." He said that he wanted his next solo album to be stripped down with larger production elements.

== Songs ==
"I Want You" opens with the sound of alarm bells from a Fairlight CMI. In an interview with Jim Ladd, Buckingham said that he wanted the song to "sound like a bunch of sixteen year-olds in a garage, even to the point where the sound is bordering on being substandard". The title track and "Slow Dancing" were lifted from the album as singles. The former became Buckingham's second top 40 hit in the US.

Buckingham noted that "I Must Go" was about ending a relationship, stating that "commitment can become no less than a form of self-destruction. At some point, you've gotta let go". He said that the verses and pre-chorus were intended to build up tension, while the chorus served as a vehicle for releasing that tension. "Play in the Rain" is a seven minute musique concrète composition split into two parts: one on the end of side one and another on the beginning of side two. Part 1 of "Play in the Rain" was engineered entirely by Buckingham, and on the original vinyl LP release the track ended side one and was recorded up to and onto the runoff groove creating what is known as a "continuous locked groove" where the last couple of seconds of the track play continuously until the phonograph arm is lifted (on the cassette and CD versions, the song simply fades out). To achieve the sound of a sitar on "Play in the Rain", Buckingham detuned his Stratocaster "until the strings were as loose and pliant as a real sitar".

Inspired by the work of Laurie Anderson, Buckingham sought to make his voice resemble an instrument on "Bang the Drum". To accomplish this, he broke up the lyrics into fragments and sang them individually so that each syllable would alternate from channel to channel. Other songs on the album such as "I Want You" used similar production techniques for the vocals. Buckingham also played two different parts on the Fairlight CMI's harmonium/accordion preset setting; one was straight eighth notes while the other was gated to create "a steady throbbing effect". Each of these parts were then played three different times in an effort to smooth out sonic discrepancies between the tracks. "D.W. Suite" was dedicated to Dennis Wilson of the Beach Boys, who had died the December before the album was released. The song is divided into three different sections, one of which features an interpolation of "The Bonnie Banks o' Loch Lomond", a Scottish folk song. A nineteenth century lap harp was used on "D.W. Suite"; the instrument was gifted to Buckingham by Mick Fleetwood during the Mirage sessions for the song "Empire State".

== Release ==
Whereas Buckingham's first solo album Law and Order was released by Asylum Records, Go Insane was instead released by Elektra Records. Buckingham said that this record deal was secured with the help of his former manager Irving Azoff, who had also signed Stevie Nicks as a solo artist. Much of the album's promotional efforts were placed on the title track, which was released as a single and received a music video with heavy special effects, which Buckingham helped with by providing ideas for its conceptual development. Members of Elektra management reached an agreement to use Agfa's high grade ferric formulation known as Magnetite-12 for cassette duplication after being convinced of the tape's quality by engineers associated with WEA.

To promote the album in Europe, Music & Media reported that Buckingham would be appear on Sky Channel for their September 13, 1984 broadcast. They also said that Buckingham would make promo trips to Amsterdam, Cologne, Munich, and Paris.

Go Insane entered Billboard's US album chart on September 1, eventually reaching No. 45. In the September 8, 1984 edition of Billboard, Michael Morrissey compared airplay from Rumours to Go Insane, saying that "When Fleetwood Mac's 'Rumours' yielded four top 10 singles seven years ago, radio jumped on every cut...Seven years later, Fleetwood Mac's Lindsey Buckingham released a second solo album, and only one cut (the title song, "Go Insane") is receiving decent exposure."

In addition to "Go Insane", a music video was also created "Slow Dancing", both of which were shot in England. Buckingham noted that the ideas for these videos "were far more complex in terms of the number of shots, in terms of the rhythm of the editing, in terms of the use of effects... I thought that in some ways the video form seemed to align itself better to my sensibilities, which were somewhat off to the left, potentially anyway, than it would for Fleetwood Mac." In 1985, Buckingham received seven nominations in the MTV Video Music Awards from his Go Insane album; four were for the title track and three were for "Slow Dancing".

Buckingham considered touring to support the album, but explained that some logistical problems rendered it difficult to accomplish this. "I would like to take something on the road that was different. But I'm not gonna go overboard. You need enough people up there, and I'm probably rationalizing because I just can't afford it. There's nothing you could do on this album that could be done with a standard four-piece combo anyway. But at some point, I think I've got a lot of spastic energy onstage that I think I could use to my own good ends." He ultimately decided against touring, which he partially attributed to studio obligations with Fleetwood Mac and his belief that promoting his solo work was trivial in comparison. He also thought that he needed to accumulate more solo material to justify a full tour on his own. Buckingham did tour in support of his third solo album, Out of the Cradle, in 1992.

== Critical reception ==
Professional ratings
Review scores
Source	Rating
AllMusic	3.5/5 stars
People	A−
Rolling Stone	4/5 stars
The New Rolling Stone Album Guide	3/5 stars

The album received mixed to positive reviews. People magazine said that the record was "studded with power pop gems" reminiscent of Buckingham's work with Fleetwood Mac. Rolling Stone believed that the album was Buckingham's "least commercial work, but also his most daring and savory." They further singled out "Bang the Drum" as the album's best song and identified the influence of David Byrne and Brian Wilson within the album's production and music.

Stereo Review listed Go Insane as its best album of the month in the November 1984 edition of the publication. They said that there was "a genuinely visionary quality" to Go Insane, with songs that are "all just askew enough to be profoundly and aesthetically disorienting", citing the album's "insanely inappropriate instrumental segues, preposterous symphonic percussion, tacky Baroque sounding keyboards, bizarre vocal effects, [and] stinging neopsychedelic sitar-like lines". BAM ranked the album No. 8 on its Critics Poll for 1984.

William Ruhlmann of AllMusic believed that the album prioritized "studio wizardry" over songcraft with the exception of "D.W. Suite". He also felt that the album "lacked the accessibility to make it more than a moderate seller" and that it served more as a "laboratory experiment" for what Buckingham would later do with Fleetwood Mac.

== Track listing ==
All tracks are written by Lindsey Buckingham, except where noted.

Side one
No.	Title	Writer(s)	Length
1.	"I Want You"	Buckingham; Gordon Fordyce	3:18
2.	"Go Insane"		3:08
3.	"Slow Dancing"		4:05
4.	"I Must Go"		4:51
5.	"Play in the Rain"		3:21

Side two
No.	Title	Length
6.	"Play in the Rain (Continued)"	4:14
7.	"Loving Cup"	5:02
8.	"Bang the Drum"	3:31
9.	"D.W. Suite"	6:50
Total length:		38:20

== Personnel ==
Musicians

- Lindsey Buckingham – vocals, guitars, bass, Fairlight CMI, pump organ (8), LinnDrum, percussion, lap harp (9)
- Gordon Fordyce – keyboards (1), cowbell (1), howling (5)
- Bryant Simpson – bass (2)

Production and artwork

- Roy Thomas Baker – executive producer
- Lindsey Buckingham – producer, recording
- Gordon Fordyce – producer, recording
- John Boghosian – recording assistant
- George Marino – mastering
- Sterling Sound (New York City, New York) – mastering location
- Vigon Seireeni – art direction
- Matthew Rolston – photography
- Michael Brokaw – management

== Charts ==
Chart (1984)	Peak position
Swedish Albums (Sverigetopplistan)	33
US Billboard 200	45
US Cash Box Top 200 Albums	39
