= D.W. Suite =

1984 song by Lindsey Buckingham

Single by Lindsey Buckingham

from the album Go Insane
- A-side: "Slow Dancing"
- Released: October 1984
- Recorded: 1983–1984
- Studio: L. B.'s Garage
- Length: 6:50
- Label: Reprise; Warner Music Group
- Songwriter: Lindsey Buckingham

"D.W. Suite" is the final song on Lindsey Buckingham's second solo album, Go Insane (1984). It was released as the B-side to the song "Slow Dancing", also from the same album. The song was written as a tribute to Dennis Wilson, who drowned in December 1983.

== Composition ==
"D.W. Suite" was not one of the dozen songs that Buckingham presented to Roy Thomas Baker in England. Rather, Buckingham wrote the song a few days after the death of Dennis Wilson in late 1983. Buckingham, who had been working with engineer Gordon Fordyce on Go Insane, requested one week off to work on "D.W. Suite", which he assembled over the course of six days. Buckingham explained his reasoning for dedicating a song to Dennis Wilson:

"Dennis wasn't really a friend, but he dated Christine [McVie] for about three years so I knew him fairly well. He created for me a window into the inner workings of the Beach Boys. Of course, Brian Wilson had always been such a big influence on me that when Dennis died, it got me thinking about The Beach Boys and the rough time that they've had all around, really, and the fact that Brian went from a very commercial format into a far more experimental vein".

The song is divided into three movements: "The Wish", "The Prayer", and "The Reflection". Buckingham incorporated both contemporary and traditional themes into "D.W. Suite", including an interpolation of "The Bonnie Banks o' Loch Lomond". One section of the song features a live audio recording of the Beach Boys being introduced to a screaming audience. Whereas most of the lead vocals on Go Insane were recorded at Cherokee Studios, Buckingham instead conducted some vocal work for "D.W. Suite" in one of his bathrooms. A nineteenth century lap harp is utilized throughout the song; Mick Fleetwood gave the instrument to Buckingham as a gift during the Mirage sessions.

== Critical reception ==
AllMusic hailed “D.W. Suite” as Go Insane's most ambitious composition and the only song on the album that did not succumb to "gimmicky sound effect[s] or [a] busy arrangement." Ultimate Classic Rock singled out "D.W. Suite" as "an exquisite piece of art-pop that shows what Buckingham can achieve when he traps himself in his studio with a Fairlight synthesizer." In a review from the Los Angeles Times, Kristine McKenna wrote that "D.W. Suite" was "the best song Brian Wilson never wrote." The publication further highlighted the song’s "wafting layers of sound [that] incorporate harp, church bells, ambient noise and gurgling water." The Washington Post described the song as "a heartfelt eulogy for a musical hero who never quite coped with the breakdowns on the road to utopia."
