= Roland DDR-30 =

Digital Drums Module

DDR-30
- Manufacturer: Roland Corporation
- Dates: 1985
- Price: $1,195 MSRP

Technical specifications
- Polyphony: 6-voice
- Timbrality: 6
- Oscillator: 8
- Synthesis type: Sample-based synthesis
- Velocity expression: Gated and controls Bend parameter.
- Storage memory: Internal: 48 patches and 32 drum kits; Memory cartridge: 64 drum kits.
- Hardware: 2 RU case,16-character VFD, data cartridge slot.

Input/output
- External control: 6 XLR Pad triggers, Bank shift foot switch, Set shift foot switch, MIDI Thru / Out / In.
- Audio sample: (24) 12-bit samples on PCM chip

The Roland DDR-30 "Alpha Drum" is a digital PCM drum module built by Roland, in early 1985. It was introduced during 1985 Summer NAMM industry trade show in New Orleans.

== Features ==
The Roland DDR-30 Digital Drum module is designed to pair with PD-10 and PD-20 pads to form the Alpha Drum System, or via MIDI controller (e.g. Roland Pad 8). The DDR-30 and Alpha Drums was the first-generation of Roland electronic drum sets.

=== Hardware ===
The Roland DDR-30 measures 3.5"x 19"x 12" (H x W x D) and it's two units tall. The module sports a large VFD display window. All patch data is shown here from selected voice to parameter information. Below the window are a series of buttons for Edit write, Set write, Bank select, and then eight drum set buttons. Next to these are rocker switches for Instrument Select (up and down) and Patch Select. To the right of these are six edit buttons, arranged in two rows, including: Forward; Back; Voice; Gate; Pitch; and EQ. Next to these are four more to control Pad sensitivity, Cartridge operations, Copy button and MIDI settings. Next to these we have a large Alpha Dial to modify voice parameters. Finally we have a memory cartridge slot, a MIDI message light, and a Power button.

==== 1985 Prototype ====
Early prototype DDR-30s included six rotary potentiometers to the right of the Alpha Dial. The function of these pots is individual volume adjustment for the six voices. Knobs are labeled Bass, Snare, Tom 1, Tom 2, Tom 3, Tom 4 These were later removed when the module was released to public.

=== Voice Synthesis ===
The Roland DDR-30 has 6-voices: a bass, a snare, and four toms. Each voice has four 12-bit PCM digital sampled sounds. These sounds can be modified by 16 parameters, saved as drum patch presets, and combined into drum kits. The parameters are combined into edit groups, including Attack, Decay, Pitch, EQ, Bend, and Gate.

You are limited to only the factory PCM samples. ROM chips are not swap-able (i.e. Simmons or DMX) and no external sample cartridges were available.

=== External Control ===
Unlike the Roland PM-16 Trigger-to-MIDI module, the DDR-30 is both a tone generator and trigger module. The DDR-30 includes six XLR input jacks for connecting to the Roland PD-20 drum pads and PD-10 or PD-11 kick drum. The DDR-30 is not compatible with modern Roland triggers (e.g. PD-21, PD-31, PD-8, etc..) which use 1/4 inch TRS cables. It however can be triggered via MIDI messages from a wide variety of controllers (keyboard, drum machine, sequencer, computer, or percussion controller). During 1985, Roland released the Pad 8 percussion controller, which could control the DDR-30 digital drum module over MIDI.

=== Audio Output ===
The DDR-30 includes stereo main unbalanced audio mix outputs. The right main output doubles as mono output. Audio mix parameters include volume, treble, and bass for all voices. There is not a parameter to adjust voice panning or to exclude voices from main mix output. However, the module does have six unbalanced individual outputs for each voice.

=== Memory/Storage ===
Patches and Kits can be saved into internal memory and optional M-16C memory cartridge. 48 patches (8 per voice) and 32 kits can be saved to internal memory . The M-16C can store an additional 64 patch presets.

== Notable Users/Endorsements ==
- Peter Gill (Frankie Goes to Hollywood)
- Michael Giles (King Crimson)
- Alister "Ali" James Score (A Flock of Seagulls)
- Front 242
- Walfredo Reys Jr. (Chicago, Manny Charlton Band, Traffic, Santana)
- Tommy Snyder (Godiego)
- Carlos Flores "Carlangas" (Los Temerarios)
- Mario Alberto Ortiz (Los Temerarios)
- Charly Alberti (Soda Stereo)

== Owners Manual ==
- Roland DDR-30 Digital Drums Owners Manual (EN)
- Roland DDR-30 Digital Drums Service Notes Version 1 (EN, JP)

== Additional Reading ==
- Weinberg, Norman (March 1987). "The Machine Shop: Electronics in Teaching: Part 1". Modern Drummer. 11 (3): 64. ISSN 0194-4533.
- Weinberg, Norman (1989). "The Electronic Drummer". Modern Drummer Publications Inc. ISBN 9789991473499.
- Encyclotronic | Roland Digital Drums DDR-30
- "Tommy Snyder: V-Drums Developer Interview". Roland UK: Artists.
