= In Our Own Time (song) =

Single by Lindsey Buckingham

from the album Seeds We Sow
- Released: 2011
- Genre: Rock
- Length: 4:20
- Label: Mind Kit Records
- Songwriter: Lindsey Buckingham
- Producer: Lindsey Buckingham

Lindsey Buckingham singles chronology
"Seeds We Sow" (2011)	"In Our Own Time" (2011)	"When She Comes Down" (2011)

"In Our Own Time" is a song by American vocalist and guitarist Lindsey Buckingham from his sixth solo studio album Seeds We Sow. The song was released as a single in 2011 and performed live in advance of the album. Buckingham wrote the song about the relationship with his wife. Similar to most tracks on Seeds We Sow, Buckingham played every instrument on "In Our Own Time".

== Background ==
In an interview with NPR, Buckingham identified "In Our Own Time" as a song that he "loved a great deal". He mentioned to NPR and Spinner that the lyrics were about his wife and his desire to approach their relationship with patience and trust.

I guess that song is about coming to terms with the fact that there are things that are always not going to be comfortable, things that you're not always going to understand in your life or in your relationship, and that to some degree, you've got to inject a constant dose of faith into the fact that things will evolve in their own way, in their own time, without you exerting a huge amount of control over the situation. There is only so much you can control or understand in any given situation, and you've got to somehow find the balance between being proactive in your involvement in anything and also being a bit passive about letting it have its own life as well.

— Lindsey Buckingham

When recording "In Our Own Time", Buckingham connected his guitars directly into the mixing console and processed the instrument with outboard effects, particularly delay. He described the delay as acting like "a counter instrument" that allowed him to experiment with the timing of the audio effect by intertwining his parts with the delayed guitars.

Buckingham debuted the song on April 22, 2011 for his performance at the Saban Theater, which included five other songs from his forthcoming Seeds We Sow album. These recordings were later released on his Songs From The Small Machine: Live In L.A live album. On June 13, 2011, Billboard announced that "In Our Own Time" would be released as the first single from Seeds We Sow. A music video for "In Our Own Time" was made available on September 6, 2011, which coincided with the release of Seeds We Sow.

== Critical reception ==
In its August 2011 review of the single, Ultimate Classic Rock wrote that the song possessed a "frenetic acoustic guitar work that makes Buckingham's famous stripped rendition of 'Big Love' look tame" and was "compressed almost beyond recognition." American Songwriter characterized "In Our Own Time" as an "electronic-spattered" song that "climaxes in a torrent of head-rush arpeggios. The Boston Globe felt that the song's guitar tone resembled a "buzzing gnat." The A.V. Club wrote that the song "wrings sorcery out of Buckingham's signature finger-picked arpeggios and haunted swathes of harmony." The Chicago Tribune described the song as being overtaken by Tense guitar-playing and furtive percussion." PopMatters said that the song transitions from a "reflective yet hopeful verse to a jolting chorus". Jon Pareles of The New York Times wrote that the song had "sudden outbursts of syncopated picking, leaping out like controlled ambushes."
