= Simon Thirlaway =

Simon Thirlaway is a director of photography.

In 2008 he was nominated for MTV Video Music Award for Best Cinematography on Katy Perry — "I Kissed a Girl" (Director of Photography: Simon Thirlaway).

Thirlaway's cinematographic work includes commercials, music videos, live concerts, and feature-length films. He has filmed commercials for brands such as Fanta, Coffee-Mate, Kindle books, and Doritos. His cinematography in music videos, includes "Chillin" by Wale and featuring Lady Gaga, Rob Thomas' "Little Wonders", John Mayer's "Half of My Heart", and Jason Derulo's "Ridin' Solo". He worked on live concerts for Muse, Metallica, and John Tesh and was directed by Wayne Isham. Thirlaway began his career in London, engaging in lighting and electrician capacities on film productions. He was electrician on the 1997 Pet Shop Boys: Somewhere video documentary. In 1999, he was best boy for the Tim Roth-directed drama The War Zone and in 2005 he was electrician for the Hollywood film Hard Candy. Thirlaway gained recognition in 2008 for his work in utilising a Red One digital camera. He had previously utilised digital cameras such as Thomson's Grass Valley Viper and Sony's F950 and F900 CineAlta models, but the Doritos “Crash The Superbowl Contest” cinema ad represented the first such use of The Red One camera. He filmed the 30-second teaser in a number of different environments, including a paparazzi-filled crowd and a live-concert venue. He has since filmed a number of projects utilising The Red One, including commercials for Der Wienerschnitzel, Ford/American Idol, Toyota, POM, and Guitar Hero 5.
