= MTV Video Music Award for Most Experimental Video =

Annual music video award

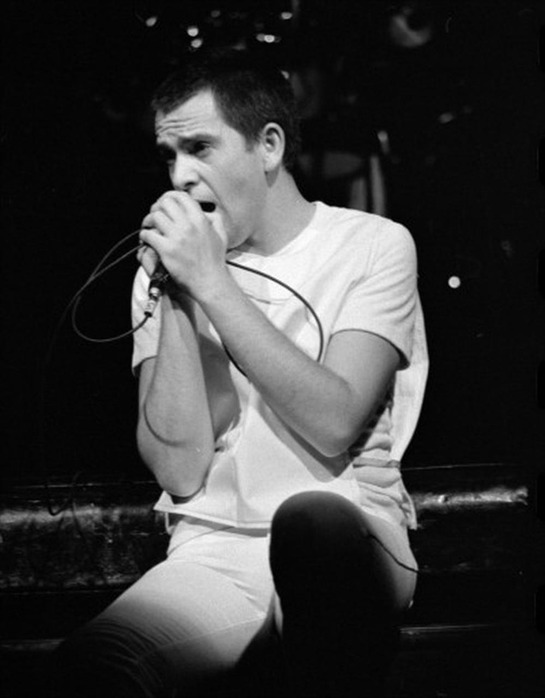
- "Sledgehammer" by Peter Gabriel was the last recipient of this award.
- Country: United States
- Presented by: MTV
- First award: 1984
- Final award: 1987
- Currently held by: Peter Gabriel – "Sledgehammer" (1987)

Highlights
- Most nominations: Lindsey Buckingham (2)
- Website: VMA website

The MTV Video Music Award for Most Experimental Video was first awarded in 1984. The last of this award was given out in 1987, after which it was replaced with Breakthrough Video the following year.

During the category's brief existence, several directors were nominated for multiple videos, including Daniel Kleinman (5 nominations), Steve Barron (3 nominations with 1 win), Godley & Creme (2 nominations with 1 win), and Mary Lambert (2 nominations).

== Recipients ==
Year	Winner	Other nominees
1984	Herbie Hancock — "Rockit" (directed by Godley & Creme)	The Cars — "You Might Think" (directed by Charlie Levi, Alex Weil, and Jeff Stein); Thomas Dolby — "Hyperactive!" (directed by Dolby and Daniel Kleinman); The Alan Parsons Project — "Don't Answer Me" (directed by D.J. Webster); Neil Young — "Wonderin'" (directed by Tim Pope)
1985	Art of Noise — "Close (to the Edit)" (directed by Zbigniew Rybczyński)	Lindsey Buckingham — "Go Insane" (directed by Daniel Kleinman); Lindsey Buckingham — "Slow Dancing" (directed by Daniel Kleinman); Chris Isaak — "Dancin'" (directed by Mary Lambert); Lone Justice — "Ways to Be Wicked" (directed by Mary Lambert)
1986	a-ha — "Take On Me" (directed by Steve Barron)	Pat Benatar — "Sex as a Weapon" (directed by Daniel Kleinman); Dire Straits — "Money for Nothing" (directed by Steve Barron); X — "Burning House of Love" (directed by Daniel Kleinman); ZZ Top — "Rough Boy" (directed by Steve Barron)
1987	Peter Gabriel — "Sledgehammer" (directed by Stephen R. Johnson)	Eurythmics — "Missionary Man" (directed by Willy Smax); Genesis — "Land of Confusion" (directed by John Lloyd and James "Jim" Yukich; Huey Lewis and the News — "Hip to Be Square" (directed by Godley & Creme); Paul Simon — "The Boy in the Bubble" (directed by Jim Blashfield
