= 1985 MTV Video Music Awards =

1985 award ceremony

- Date: Friday, September 13, 1985
- Location: Radio City Music Hall, New York, New York
- Country: United States
- Hosted by: Eddie Murphy
- Most awards: Don Henley (4)
- Most nominations: David Lee Roth (8)

Television/radio coverage
- Network: MTV
- Produced by: Don Ohlmeyer; Bob Pittman; Edd Griles
- Directed by: Edd Griles

The 1985 MTV Video Music Awards aired live on September 13, 1985, honoring the best music videos from May 2, 1984, to May 1, 1985. The show was hosted by Eddie Murphy at the Radio City Music Hall in New York City.

Don Henley was the night's biggest winner, taking home four Moonmen, including Video of the Year. His video for "The Boys of Summer" was also the most nominated video of the year, receiving seven nominations in total. David Lee Roth turned out to be the most nominated artist, receiving eight nominations for two of his videos: five for "Just a Gigolo/I Ain't Got Nobody" and three for "California Girls." However, Roth did not receive any awards.

Other major nominees included Lindsey Buckingham, Bryan Adams, Eurythmics, Madonna, and Tom Petty and the Heartbreakers. Buckingham tied with Don Henley with seven nominations: three for "Slow Dancing" and four for "Go Insane." Right after him came six-time nominee Adams, who received five nominations for "Run to You" and one for "Heaven." Lastly, Madonna, Eurythmics, and Petty received five nominations each: Madonna received three for "Like a Virgin" and two for "Material Girl", while Tom Petty and Eurythmics received all five nominations for "Don't Come Around Here No More" and "Would I Lie to You?", respectively.

== Background ==
In June 1985, MTV announced that the 1985 Video Music Awards would be held on September 13 at Radio City Music Hall. Preliminary nominees with 10 videos per category were announced in mid-July before the final set of nominees was announced at a press conference at New York's Hard Rock Cafe on August 13. Eddie Murphy was announced as the ceremony's host in mid-July.

== Performances ==
List of musical performances
Artist(s)	Song(s)	Ref.
Eurythmics	"Would I Lie to You?"	
David Ruffin; Eddie Kendrick; Hall & Oates	"Everytime You Go Away" "The Way You Do the Things You Do" "My Girl"	
Tears for Fears	"Shout"	
John Mellencamp	"Lonely Ol' Night"	
Pat Benatar	"7-Rooms of Gloom"	
Sting	"If You Love Somebody Set Them Free"	
Eddie Murphy	"Party All the Time"	

== Presenters ==
- Sheila E. and Paul Young – presented Best Overall Performance in a Video
- Run-DMC – rapped the eligibility and voting rules for the VMAs
- Foreigner (Mick Jones and Lou Gramm) – presented Best Stage Performance in a Video
- Bryan Adams and Jim Kerr – presented Best New Artist in a Video
- The Cars (Benjamin Orr and Elliot Easton) – presented Most Experimental Video
- Martha Quinn – introduced the presentations of the professional categories
- Mark Goodman – announced the winner of Best Art Direction in a Video
- Alan Hunter – announced the winner of Best Cinematography in a Video
- Nina Blackwood – announced the winners of Best Special Effects in a Video
- J. J. Jackson – announced the winner of Best Editing in a Video
- Julian Lennon and Corey Hart – presented Best Choreography in a Video
- Morris Day – presented Best Concept Video
- John Taylor and Andy Taylor – presented Video Vanguard to Russell Mulcahy
- Chrissie Hynde – presented Video Vanguard to David Byrne
- Herbie Hancock – presented Video Vanguard to Godley & Creme
- Glenn Frey – presented Best Direction in a Video
- Joan Baez – presented the Special Recognition Award
- Don Henley – presented Best Group Video
- Aimee Mann and Stephen Pearcy – presented Viewer's Choice
- Grace Jones – presented Best Male Video
- David Lee Roth – presented Best Female Video
- Tina Turner – presented Video of the Year

== Winners and nominees ==
Winners are listed first and highlighted in bold.

Video of the Year	Best Male Video
**Don Henley – "The Boys of Summer"**; Tom Petty and the Heartbreakers – "Don't Come Around Here No More"; David Lee Roth – "California Girls"; David Lee Roth – "Just a Gigolo/I Ain't Got Nobody"; USA for Africa – "We Are the World"	**Bruce Springsteen – "I'm on Fire"**; Glenn Frey – "Smuggler's Blues"; Don Henley – "The Boys of Summer"; David Lee Roth – "California Girls"; David Lee Roth – "Just a Gigolo/I Ain't Got Nobody"
Best Female Video	Best Group Video
**Tina Turner – "What's Love Got to Do with It"**; Cyndi Lauper – "She Bop"; Madonna – "Material Girl"; Sade – "Smooth Operator"; Sheila E. – "The Glamorous Life"	**USA for Africa – "We Are the World"**; The Cars – "Drive"; Eurythmics – "Would I Lie to You?"; Huey Lewis and the News – "If This Is It"; U2 – "Pride (In the Name of Love)"
Best New Artist in a Video	Best Concept Video
**'Til Tuesday – "Voices Carry"**; Frankie Goes to Hollywood – "Two Tribes"; Julian Lennon – "Too Late for Goodbyes"; Sade – "Smooth Operator"; Sheila E. – "The Glamorous Life"	**Glenn Frey – "Smuggler's Blues"**; Frankie Goes to Hollywood – "Two Tribes"; Don Henley – "The Boys of Summer"; Tom Petty and the Heartbreakers – "Don't Come Around Here No More"; David Lee Roth – "Just a Gigolo/I Ain't Got Nobody"
Most Experimental Video	Best Stage Performance in a Video
**Art of Noise – "Close (to the Edit)"**; Lindsey Buckingham – "Go Insane"; Lindsey Buckingham – "Slow Dancing"; Chris Isaak – "Dancin'"; Lone Justice – "Ways to Be Wicked"	**Bruce Springsteen & The E Street Band – "Dancing in the Dark"**; David Bowie – "Blue Jean (live)"; Eurythmics – "Would I Lie to You?"; Talking Heads – "Once in a Lifetime (live)"; Tina Turner – "Better Be Good to Me"
Best Overall Performance in a Video	Best Direction in a Video
**Philip Bailey and Phil Collins – "Easy Lover"**; Eurythmics – "Would I Lie to You?"; David Lee Roth – "Just a Gigolo/I Ain't Got Nobody"; Bruce Springsteen – "Dancing in the Dark"; USA for Africa – "We Are the World"	**Don Henley – "The Boys of Summer" (Director: Jean-Baptiste Mondino)**; Bryan Adams – "Run to You" (Director: Steven Barron); Duran Duran – "The Wild Boys" (Director: Russell Mulcahy); Chris Isaak – "Dancin'" (Director: Mary Lambert); Tom Petty and the Heartbreakers – "Don't Come Around Here No More" (Director: Jeff Stein); Simple Minds – "Don't You (Forget About Me)" (Director: Daniel Kleinman); Toto – "Stranger in Town" (Director: Steven Barron)
Best Choreography in a Video	Best Special Effects in a Video
**Elton John – "Sad Songs (Say So Much)" (Choreographer: David Atkins)**; Eurythmics – "Would I Lie to You?" (Choreographer: Eddie Baytos); Madonna – "Like a Virgin" (Choreographer: Madonna); Madonna – "Material Girl" (Choreographer: Kenny Ortega); Prince and The Revolution – "When Doves Cry" (Choreographer: Prince); Sheila E. – "The Glamorous Life" (Choreographer: Lesli Glatter); Tina Turner – "Private Dancer" (Choreographer: Arlene Phillips)	**Tom Petty and the Heartbreakers – "Don't Come Around Here No More" (Special Effects: Tony Mitchell, Kathy Dougherty and Peter Cohen)**; Bryan Adams – "Run to You" (Special Effects: Cinebuild); Lindsey Buckingham – "Go Insane" (Special Effects: David Yardley); Lindsey Buckingham – "Slow Dancing" (Special Effects: David Yardley); Culture Club – "It's a Miracle" (Special Effects: David Yardley)
Best Art Direction in a Video	Best Editing in a Video
**Don Henley – "The Boys of Summer" (Art Director: Bryan Jones)**; Bryan Adams – "Run to You" (Art Director: Steven Barron); Peter Brown – "Zie Zie Won't Dance" (Art Director: John Jolly); Culture Club – "It's a Miracle" (Art Director: Bruce Hill); Madonna – "Like a Virgin" (Art Director: John Ebdon); Simple Minds – "Don't You (Forget About Me)" (Art Director: Mark Rimmell)	**Art of Noise – "Close (to the Edit)" (Editor: Zbigniew Rybczyński)**; Bryan Adams – "Run to You" (Editor: John Mister); Lindsey Buckingham – "Go Insane" (Editor: David Yardley); Lindsey Buckingham – "Slow Dancing" (Editor: David Yardley); Eurythmics – "Would I Lie to You?" (Editor: Glenn Morgan)
Best Cinematography in a Video	Viewer's Choice
**Don Henley – "The Boys of Summer" (Director of Photography: Pascal Lebègue)**; Bryan Adams – "Heaven (version 2)" (Director of Photography: Peter MacDonald); Bryan Adams – "Run to You" (Director of Photography: Frank Gell); Lindsey Buckingham – "Go Insane" (Director of Photography: Oliver Stapleton); Madonna – "Like a Virgin" (Director of Photography: Peter Sinclair)	**USA for Africa – "We Are the World"**; Don Henley – "The Boys of Summer"; Tom Petty and the Heartbreakers – "Don't Come Around Here No More"; David Lee Roth – "California Girls"; David Lee Roth – "Just a Gigolo/I Ain't Got Nobody"
Video Vanguard Award
**David Byrne**; **Russell Mulcahy**; **Godley & Creme**
Special Recognition Award
**Bob Geldof**

== Artists with multiple wins and nominations ==
Artists who received multiple awards
Wins	Artist
4	Don Henley
2	Art of Noise
2	Bruce Springsteen
2	USA for Africa

Artists who received multiple nominations
Nominations	Artist
8	David Lee Roth
7	Lindsey Buckingham
7	Don Henley
6	Bryan Adams
5	Eurythmics
5	Madonna
5	Tom Petty and the Heartbreakers
4	USA for Africa
3	Bruce Springsteen
3	Sheila E.
3	Tina Turner
2	Art of Noise
2	Chris Isaak
2	Culture Club
2	Frankie Goes to Hollywood
2	Glenn Frey
2	Sade
2	Simple Minds

== Music Videos with multiple wins and nominations ==
Music Videos that received multiple awards
Wins	Artist	Music Video
4	Don Henley	"The Boys of Summer"
2	Art of Noise	"Close (to the Edit)"
2	USA for Africa	"We Are the World"

Music Videos that received multiple nominations
Nominations	Artist	Music Video
7	Don Henley	"The Boys of Summer"
5	Bryan Adams	"Run to You"
5	David Lee Roth	"Just a Gigolo/I Ain't Got Nobody"
5	Eurythmics	"Would I Lie to You?"
5	Tom Petty and the Heartbreakers	"Don't Come Around Here No More"
4	Lindsey Buckingham	"Go Insane"
4	USA for Africa	"We Are the World"
3	David Lee Roth	"California Girls"
3	Lindsey Buckingham	"Slow Dancing"
3	Madonna	"Like a Virgin"
3	Sheila E.	"The Glamorous Life"
2	Art of Noise	"Close (to the Edit)"
2	Bruce Springsteen	"Dancing in the Dark"
2	Chris Isaak	"Dancin'"
2	Culture Club	"It's a Miracle"
2	Frankie Goes to Hollywood	"Two Tribes"
2	Glenn Frey	"Smuggler's Blues"
2	Madonna	"Material Girl"
2	Sade	"Smooth Operator"
2	Simple Minds	"Don't You (Forget About Me)"

== Other appearances ==
- Little Steven – accepted the Best Stage Performance award on behalf of Bruce Springsteen
- Lou Reed – appeared in a video package about the year's new artists
- Kris P. – accepted the Best Editing award on behalf of Zbigniew Rybczyński
- Dave Stewart – accepted the Best Choreography award on behalf of Elton John
- John Sayles – accepted the Best Male Video award on behalf of Bruce Springsteen
