= Go Insane (song) =

- US picture sleeve

Single by Lindsey Buckingham

from the album Go Insane
- B-side: "Play in the Rain"
- Released: July 1984
- Genre: Electronic rock; dance-rock
- Length: 3:08
- Label: Elektra; Mercury
- Songwriter: Lindsey Buckingham
- Producers: Lindsey Buckingham; Gordon Fordyce

Lindsey Buckingham singles chronology
"Holiday Road" (1983)	"Go Insane" (1984)	"Slow Dancing" (1984)

Audio sample
- "Go Insane": file; help

"Go Insane" is a song recorded by American musician Lindsey Buckingham for his second solo album of the same name. Released as the album's lead single in July 1984, it became Buckingham's second top-40 hit in the United States, following "Trouble", three years earlier. "Go Insane" remains his most recent U.S. solo hit, peaking at No. 23 in the Billboard Hot 100 chart. In the UK, the single was released in August on Mercury Records and received airplay from 20 playlists across the country by early September.

In 1985, "Go Insane" received four nominations at the 1985 MTV Video Music Awards: Most Experimental Video, Best Special Effects in a Video, Best Editing in a Video, and Best Cinematography in a Video, although it did not win any of these categories.

== Lyrics ==
When asked about the lyrics of "Go Insane", Buckingham explained that the song was about being on the verge of insanity rather than a perpetual state of insanity, saying that "we all go insane from time to time. There are times when we tend to go out a little bit and you're walking on that edge." Buckingham said that the "I lost my power in this world" lyric refers to the "power of discipline" and "the power to progress".

In later years, Buckingham stated that the song, "Go Insane", was actually written about his post-break up relationship with former lover, Stevie Nicks.

"We were disintegrating as couples, by virtue of that, we were suffering as people. So in order to get work done, I had to go through this elaborate exercise in denial – leaving whole areas of baggage on the other side of the room, compartmentalize feelings... no time to get closure, to work things out... working in a very highly charged and ambivalent environment. So the go insane thing – would just be whenever I let my guard down and got back to all the things I hadn’t dealt with, it was almost like going insane – like I always do. Took a long, long time, working in an artificial environment on a personal level. So many things not worked through for a long, long time."

== Critical reception ==
Billboard described the song as "aggressive, electronic dance-rock" and predicted that the song would "reestablish [Buckingham's] prominence as a soloist." Chris Morris of Musician magazine thought that the title track possessed "nervous undercurrents". The Washington Post commented that the song's "punchy mid-tempo rhythm, catchy guitar riff, melody hook and the chorus harmonies all make this reminiscent of Fleetwood Mac, even if there are some odd effects in the background and an unsettling theme in the lyrics." AllMusic likened "Go Insane" to Buckingham's work with Fleetwood Mac and highlighted the song's "massed choral sounds."

== Live versions ==
During live performances, Buckingham has performed acoustic fingerstyle solo renditions of "Go Insane" on a nylon-string guitar. He first performed the song in this style on his 1992–1993 tour promoting the Out of the Cradle album and also on Fleetwood Mac's 1997 tour supporting The Dance, where it also appeared on the DVD edition of the album.

During the 2008 Gift of Screws tour, as well as Fleetwood Mac's 2009 Unleashed Tour, he played the full-band arrangement of the song. He returned to performing the solo acoustic version on his 2011 Seeds We Sow tour.

== Personnel ==
- Lindsey Buckingham – vocals, guitars, Fairlight CMI, LinnDrum
- Bryant Simpson – bass guitar

== Charts ==
=== Weekly charts ===
Weekly chart performance for "Go Insane"
Chart (1984)	Peak position
Australia (Kent Music Report)	100
Canada Top Singles (RPM)	57
US Billboard Hot 100	23
US Mainstream Rock (Billboard)	4
US Cash Box Top 100	24
US AOR/Hot Tracks (Radio & Records)	3
US Contemporary Hit Radio (Radio & Records)	19

=== Year-end charts ===
Year-end chart performance for "Go Insane"
Chart (1984)	Position
US AOR/Hot Tracks (Radio & Records)	29
