= Walfredo Reyes Jr. =

Cuban-American drummer and percussionist (born 1955)

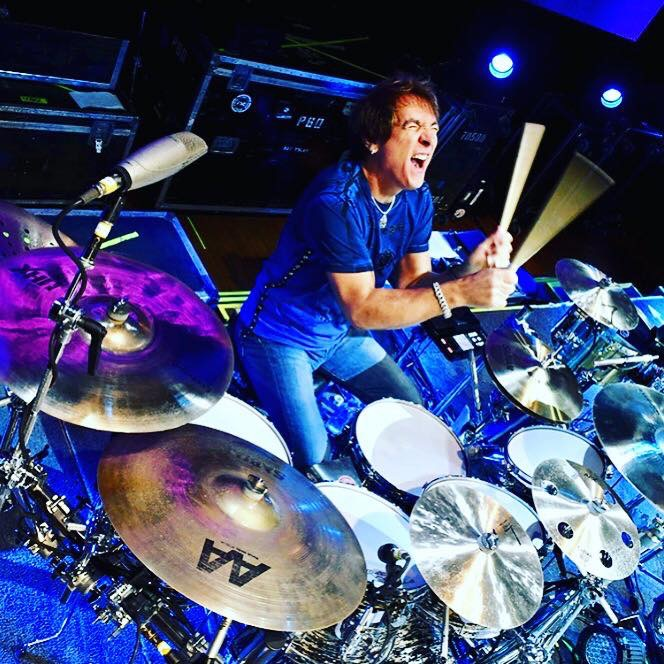
- Reyes, Jr. performing in 2018

Background information
- Also known as: Wally Reyes, Jr.; Walfredo Reyes
- Born: Walfredo de los Reyes Palau IV; December 18, 1955 (age 70); Havana, Cuba
- Genres: Jazz; latin; world; afro-cuban; rock
- Occupations: Session; full-time musician; music educator; clinician
- Instruments: Drums; percussion
- Years active: 1972–present
- Member of: Chicago
- Formerly of: Santana; Traffic
- Website: walfredoreyesjr.com

Walfredo Reyes Jr. (born Walfredo de los Reyes Palau IV; December 18, 1955) is a Cuban American musician who is a drummer, percussionist, music educator and clinician. He has performed with many jazz, Latin, World music, World fusion, Afro-Cuban, and rock bands as a touring, session recording, and full-time player/performer.

Reyes is known for his fusion of many of the world's percussion techniques, including the ability to play a drum set with his hands in addition to the traditional use of drumsticks; it was said that he can "sound like a drummer and a percussionist at the same time" He was a member of Santana and joined Chicago as the percussionist from 2012 to 2018, at which point he took over the drum seat. He also performed in the band of former Nazareth guitarist Manny Charlton. Reyes is the title character of the Phish song "Walfredo".

== Early life ==
Reyes was born on December 18, 1955, in Havana, Cuba as Walfredo de los Reyes Palau IV. His native name is a traditional Cuban combination of his paternal and maternal surnames. He is a third generation musician in a prolific professional musical lineage on both sides of his family, including several globally recognized percussion experts. His father is percussionist Walfredo Reyes, Sr.; one brother is world music percussionist Daniel de los Reyes; another brother is actor Kamar de los Reyes; and his grandfather is trumpeter and Cuban orchestral organizer, Walfredo de los Reyes II. When Reyes was 13 years-old, his family moved to Las Vegas. Around this time, Reyes was playing bongos and congas at various functions, including a dance school.

Prior to becoming a musician, Reyes was interested in becoming a veterinarian. His interest in music was fostered by the jazz and Latin American music that his parents would play throughout the house, along with contemporary music that Reyes heard on the radio. He first learned how to play percussion before convincing his father to teach him drums, who gave him a practice pad, a pair of drum sticks, a drum rudiment book written by Henry Adler, and a metronome. His father placed him with Leo Camera, who served as Reyes' instructor for a year. Reyes became a professional musician at the age of 16.

Reyes attended University of Nevada for an academic degree in music, but did not graduate, instead opting to travel and tour around the world. During this time, Reyes would visit New York City in the summer, where he took lessons with Jim Chapin.

== Career ==
Some of Reyes' earliest professional collaborations were with Juliet Prowse, Lola Falana, and Paul Anka. He then secured a gig with Doc Severinsen, with his father and Luis Conte also part of the lineup as percussionists. He moved to Los Angeles in 1981 and performed with artists including Ben Vereen and Marilyn McCoo.

When Steve Winwood reformed the band Traffic with Jim Capaldi in 1994, Reyes joined on tour as their drummer. He later worked with Winwood as a solo artist, both in a touring and a recording capacity. In 2008, Reyes toured with Mickey Hart as part of his Mickey Hart Band, which included performances at Rothbury Festival and the Milwaukee Summerfest.

Reyes has also worked with Lindsey Buckingham, having recorded with him on his 2008 Gift of Screws album. One of the songs that he played on was "Did You Miss Me", which served as the album's first single. That same year, Reyes became Buckingham's touring drummer. He continued to play with him through 2011, having also played on Buckingham's next studio album, Seeds We Sow, released that same year. While Reyes was on the road with Buckingham to promote Seeds We Sow, his touring guitarist suffered a back problem, resulting in the remainder of the tour being canceled. Soon after, he was asked by his brother Daniel de los Reyes to substitute for him on percussion with the band Chicago. Reyes agreed and was given roughly 20 minutes to learn the material before his first show. During these performances, Reyes played on some percussion equipment used by Drew Hester, who was De los Reyes's predecessor in Chicago. After De los Reyes joined the Zac Brown Band, Reyes accepted an offer from Robert Lamm to become a full-time member of Chicago.

Reyes had been a lifelong fan of Chicago and was also a long-time friend of and collaborator with the band's former drummer, Tris Imboden. Reyes joined Chicago as their percussionist in 2012 and became the band's drummer following Imboden's departure in 2018. The first album Reyes purchased as a youth with his own money was Chicago Transit Authority.

Walfredo Reyes Jr. and his wife Kirsten were married on March 21, 2020, and live in Greater Cincinnati. For the 2021 movie Being the Ricardos, Reyes coached and mentored Javier Bardem in learning the conga drums performed in the film.

== Equipment ==
In 1989, Reyes' setup included DW Drums with Remo drumheads, Zildjian cymbals, a Roland Octapad. He toured with an electronics rig consisting of a Roland DDR-30, 2 Akai S900s, an Alesis drum machine, and a Yamaha SPX 90, which were all connected via MIDI. Around this time, Reyes also played with ProMark drumsticks.

Reyes has used equipment made by Mapex Drums, Sabian Cymbals, Latin Percussion, Protection Racket drum cases, and Audix microphones.

In the 2010s, Reyes worked with Regal Tip to create the a signature series line of drumsticks called the "El Rockero" He joined the roster of Innovative Percussion in 2025.

== Timeline ==
Reyes has globally toured and/or recorded with numerous international acts, including the following:

Years	Artist
1983—1984	Tania Maria
1985—1988	David Lindley’s El Rayo X
1988	Jackson Browne
1988	Jimmy Barnes
1989—1993	Santana
1992	Boz Scaggs
1993	Gloria Estefan
1994	Traffic
1995	Robbie Robertson
1997—2004	Steve Winwood
1998—1999	Joe Sample
2000	Johnny Hallyday
2005	Khaled
2007—2011	Lindsey Buckingham
2008	Mickey Hart
2010—2012	El Chicano
2012—present	Chicago

== Videography ==
Year	Title	Artist	Credits	Source
1981	Pippin: His Life and Times		Soundtrack musician, uncredited	
1993	Santana: Sacred Fire, Live in Mexico	Santana	member	(Note: Sacred Fire: Live in South America (CD audio) and Sacred Fire: Live in Mexico (DVD video) are counterparts for the same show.)
2000	100% Johnny Live a la tour Eiffel	Johnny Hallyday	Percussion, drums	
2000	Olympia 2000 – Live a l'Olympia	Johnny Hallyday	Percussion, drums	
2003	The Studio Percussionist, Vol. 1	Michael McFall; Dave Witham; Walfredo de los Reyes; Larry Klimas; John Peña		
2005	The Last Great Traffic Jam	Traffic		
2005	Sound Stage featuring Steve Winwood	Steve Winwood	member	
2005	Global Beats for Drumset & Percussion	Walfredo Reyes Jr.	author of instructional video	
2011	Songs from the Small Machine	Lindsey Buckingham	Drums	
2011	The Road Divides	Carl Verheyen Band	Drums, percussion	
2014	Killer B3		Interviewee, drum set	
2020	Happy Birthday – Live au Parc de Sceaux	Johnny Hallyday	Percussion, drums	
