= Almeda (song) =

Song by Solange featuring Playboi Carti

from the album When I Get Home
- Released: March 1, 2019
- Genre: Trap; R&B; hip hop; chopped and screwed
- Length: 3:56
- Label: Columbia
- Songwriters: Solange Knowles; Terius Nash; Jordan Carter
- Producers: Solange Knowles; Pharrell; John Carroll Kirby

Music video
- "Almeda" on YouTube

"Almeda" is a song by American singer Solange. It is the ninth track from her fourth studio album, When I Get Home. The song was released on March 1, 2019, and features a guest appearance by American rapper and singer Playboi Carti. The song's title is a reference to Almeda, an area of Knowles' home-town of Houston, Texas. The song was written by Solange Knowles, The-Dream (who provides additional vocals) and Playboi Carti and produced by Knowles, Pharrell Williams, and John Carroll Kirby. The song also serves as the vocal debut for record producer Metro Boomin, who provides additional vocals.

== Composition and lyrics ==
The song's composition utilizes chopped and screwed, a technique of remixing hip hop music which developed in the Houston hip hop scene in the early 1990s.

The song's lyrics reference Houston culture and take pride in the "unwavering" nature of African-American culture. The song's opening lyrics "Pour more drank, drank/Sip, sip, sip, sip, sip" reference the recreational drug purple drank, a mixture that became popular in the hip hop community in the Southern United States in the 1990s, originating in Houston. The song also references Black culture "Black skin, black braids, black waves, black days, black baes, black things." The song also references the unisex cologne water Florida Water "Black faith still can't be washed away/Not even in that Florida water." Knowles previously mentioned using Florida Water to wash her hands in a piece she wrote for Dazed in April 2018. She also carried a bottle of the cologne water with her on the red carpet of the Met Gala in May 2018.

== Critical reception ==
Pitchfork praised "Almeda" as the album's "stand-out track" and awarded it Best New Track upon its release. Hunter Harris of Vulture gave the song a glowing review, saying "I want to get married so I can play 'Almeda' at my wedding. When I die, play 'Almeda' at my funeral. I'm turning this in late to my editor because I'm playing "Almeda" too loud in my room. When I Get Home has other true gems — 'Sound of Rain', 'Down with the Clique' — but 'Almeda' plays with a special alchemy of everything that feels banal, but special." Consequence of Sound gave the song a positive review and named it their Song of the Week.

== Music video ==
The "Almeda" segment of the film accompanying When I Get Home was released separately to YouTube on March 7, 2019. It features the Fort Worth Water Gardens in Fort Worth, Texas.

At the 36th MTV Video Music Awards the video received three nominations: Best Cinematography, Best Choreography and Best Editing.

== Personnel ==
- Solange Knowles – performance, production
- Playboi Carti – guest appearance
- Pharrell – production
- John Carroll Kirby – production
- Metro Boomin – additional vocals
- Mikaelin “Blue” Bluespruce – mixing
- Joe LaPorta – mastering

== Charts ==
Chart (2019)	Peak position
Lithuania (AGATA)	94
New Zealand Hot Singles (RMNZ)	18
US Bubbling Under Hot 100 (Billboard)	18
