= Luis Caraza Peimbert =

American film editor

- Occupation: Film editor
- Notable work: Ariana Grande "We Can’t Be Friends (Wait For Your Love)" SZA "Kill Bill" Lil Nas X "Industry Baby"
- Awards: MTV VMA nomination for Best Editing (2024) MTV VMA nomination for Best Editing (2023)

Luis Caraza Peimbert is a film editor known for his work in the commercial and music video industry. He has collaborated with various prominent artists including Ariana Grande, Doja Cat and Lil Nas X, and worked with brands such as Apple, Meta, Sprite, and Fortnite.

== Career ==
Luis Caraza Peimbert has made significant contributions to the music video industry through his editing work. He is best known for editing the music video for Ariana Grande's "We Can’t Be Friends (Wait For Your Love)," which garnered him a nomination for Best Editing at the 2024 MTV Video Music Awards.

== Notable works ==
- Ariana Grande – "We Can’t Be Friends (Wait For Your Love)"
- Ariana Grande – "Yes, And?"

== Awards and nominations ==
- MTV Video Music Awards, Best Editing (2026) "Hate That I Made You Love Me"
- MTV Video Music Awards, Best Editing (2024) "We Can’t Be Friends (Wait For Your Love)"
- MTV Video Music Awards, Best Editing (2023) "Kill Bill"
