= Mask Off =

2017 single by Future

Single by Future

from the album Future
- Released: April 18, 2017
- Genre: Hip hop; trap
- Length: 3:23 (original); 4:21 (remix featuring Kendrick Lamar); 2:59 (Marshmello remix)
- Label: A1; Freebandz; Epic
- Songwriters: Nayvadius Wilburn; Leland Wayne; Tommy Butler
- Producer: Metro Boomin

Future singles chronology
"No Pressure" (2017)	"Mask Off" (2017)	"Rollin" (2017)

Music video
- "Mask Off" on YouTube

Audio sample
- Future - Mask Off: file; help

"Mask Off" is a song by American rapper Future from his eponymous fifth studio album (2017). The track was later released as the second single after initially charting as an album track. "Mask Off" was written by Future alongside producer Metro Boomin, with additional writing credits going to Tommy Butler for the sampling of "Prison Song".

It was Future's highest-charting single, peaking at number five on the US Billboard Hot 100, until the releases of "Life Is Good" (2020), "Way 2 Sexy" (2021), "Wait for U" (2022), and "Like That" (2024) with the former peaking at number two, and the latter three peaking at number one. The song was also his highest charting solo song until "Puffin on Zootiez" (2022) peaked at number four. A remix featuring Kendrick Lamar was released on May 23, 2017.

Future and the FreeWishes Foundation announced the "Mask On" campaign in 2020. Together, they provided more than 100,000 masks during the COVID-19 pandemic.

== Composition ==
The song samples "Prison Song", written and produced by Tommy Butler and sung by Carlton Williams, released in 1976. In this track, Future opens up about drug use and addiction problems ("Percocets, Molly, Percocets").

== Chart performance ==
"Mask Off" peaked at number five on the US Billboard Hot 100 for the week of May 6, 2017, becoming his first top-five charting single on that chart. It also peaked in the top 10 in New Zealand, Sweden, Denmark, Switzerland, Canada, and France, where it charted the highest at number two. It has since been certified nine times platinum by the Recording Industry Association of America (RIAA) for combined sales and streaming equivalent units of over nine million units in the United States.

== Music video ==
The music video for "Mask Off" was released on May 5, 2017. It was directed by Colin Tilley, and features appearances from Amber Rose and DJ Esco.

== Live performances and remixes ==
The official remix features a guest appearance from fellow American rapper Kendrick Lamar and was mixed by engineer Alex Tumay, released on May 23, 2017. Its release follows the performance of "Mask Off" by Future alongside Kendrick Lamar at the 2017 Coachella Festival. Lamar performed live covers of "Mask Off" at every show on the Damn Tour since the release of the remix.

On May 28, 2017, Joyner Lucas released his own remix onto SoundCloud and YouTube entitled "Mask On". On the remix, he sent shots at Logic and Lil Yachty.

On June 16, 2017, a remix produced by Marshmello was released, which was deemed ironic by some as the DJ is known for masking his identity behind his namesake marshmallow-inspired helmet.

== Track listing ==
Digital download
No.	Title	Length
1.	"Mask Off"	3:23

Digital download – Remix
No.	Title	Length
1.	"Mask Off" (Remix) (featuring Kendrick Lamar)	4:17

Digital download – Marshmello Remix
No.	Title	Length
1.	"Mask Off" (Marshmello Remix)	3:00

== Charts ==
=== Weekly charts ===
Chart (2017)	Peak position
Australia (ARIA)	13
Australia Urban (ARIA)	1
Austria (Ö3 Austria Top 40)	20
Belgium (Ultratop 50 Flanders)	33
Belgium (Ultratop 50 Wallonia)	47
Canada Hot 100 (Billboard)	5
Czech Republic Singles Digital (ČNS IFPI)	27
Denmark (Tracklisten)	11
Finland (Suomen virallinen lista)	7
France (SNEP)	2
Germany (GfK)	12
Greece International (IFPI)	4
Hungary (Single Top 40)	37
Hungary (Stream Top 40)	15
Ireland (IRMA)	22
Italy (FIMI)	52
Latvia (DigiTop100)	59
Netherlands (Dutch Top 40)	19
Netherlands (Single Top 100)	16
New Zealand (Recorded Music NZ)	6
Norway (VG-lista)	10
Philippines (Philippine Hot 100)	44
Portugal (AFP)	10
Scotland Singles (Official Charts)	52
Slovakia Singles Digital (ČNS IFPI)	27
Sweden (Sverigetopplistan)	8
Switzerland (Schweizer Hitparade)	9
UK Singles (Official Charts)	22
UK Hip Hop/R&B (Official Charts)	2
US Billboard Hot 100	5
US Hot R&B/Hip-Hop Songs (Billboard)	3
US Rhythmic Airplay (Billboard)	1

=== Year-end charts ===
Chart (2017)	Position
Australia (ARIA)	64
Belgium (Ultratop Flanders)	78
Canada (Canadian Hot 100)	15
Denmark (Tracklisten)	40
France (SNEP)	8
Germany (Official German Charts)	53
Hungary (Stream Top 40)	58
Netherlands (Single Top 100)	49
New Zealand (Recorded Music NZ)	38
Sweden (Sverigetopplistan)	34
Switzerland (Schweizer Hitparade)	34
UK Singles (Official Charts Company)	43
US Billboard Hot 100	14
US Hot R&B/Hip-Hop Songs (Billboard)	7
US Rhythmic (Billboard)	19

== Certifications ==
Region	Certification	Certified units/sales
Australia (ARIA)	3× Platinum	210,000^{‡}
Austria (IFPI Austria)	Gold	15,000^{‡}
Belgium (BRMA)	Platinum	20,000^{‡}
Canada (Music Canada)	Diamond	800,000^{‡}
Denmark (IFPI Danmark)	2× Platinum	180,000^{‡}
France (SNEP)	Diamond	233,333^{‡}
Germany (BVMI)	2× Platinum	800,000^{‡}
Italy (FIMI)	2× Platinum	200,000^{‡}
Mexico (AMPROFON)	Platinum+Gold	90,000^{‡}
Netherlands (NVPI)	2× Platinum	80,000^{‡}
New Zealand (RMNZ)	6× Platinum	180,000^{‡}
Poland (ZPAV)	4× Platinum	200,000^{‡}
Portugal (AFP)	Platinum	10,000^{‡}
Spain (Promusicae)	Platinum	60,000^{‡}
Sweden (GLF)	3× Platinum	120,000^{‡}
Switzerland (IFPI Switzerland)	Platinum	20,000^{‡}
United Kingdom (BPI)	3× Platinum	1,800,000^{‡}
United States (RIAA)	14× Platinum	14,000,000^{‡}
Streaming
Greece (IFPI Greece)	2× Platinum	4,000,000^{†}
^{‡} Sales+streaming figures based on certification alone.^{†} Streaming-only figures based on certification alone.

== Release history ==
Region	Date	Format	Version	Label	Ref.
United States	April 18, 2017	Rhythmic contemporary	Original	A1; Freebandz; Epic	
United States	May 23, 2017	Digital download	Remix	A1; Freebandz; Epic	
United States	June 16, 2017	Digital download	Marshmello Remix	A1; Freebandz; Epic	

== Legacy ==
- The song was used in the Brooklyn Nine-Nine episode Return to Skyfire.
- The song was used in the Rick and Morty episode Claw and Hoarder: Special Ricktim's Morty.
- During the COVID-19 pandemic, the song experienced a resurgence, especially due to the lyrics in the chorus, "Mask on, fuck it, mask off." Future and the FreeWishes Foundation announced the "Mask On" campaign and provided more than 100,000 masks during the pandemic.
- The city of Inglewood created a COVID-19 "Mask On" PSA in 2020 to encourage people to wear protective masks during the coronavirus pandemic.

== See also ==
- List of number-one urban singles of 2017 (Australia)
- List of Billboard Hot 100 top 10 singles in 2017
