= Solo Anthology: The Best of Lindsey Buckingham =

Greatest hits album by Lindsey Buckingham
- Released: October 5, 2018
- Recorded: 1981–2018
- Genre: Rock
- Label: Rhino

Lindsey Buckingham chronology
Lindsey Buckingham Christine McVie (2017)	Solo Anthology: The Best of Lindsey Buckingham (2018)	Lindsey Buckingham (2021)

Solo Anthology: The Best of Lindsey Buckingham is a compilation album released by American musician and former Fleetwood Mac vocalist-guitarist Lindsey Buckingham, released on October 5, 2018. The album draws from all six of Buckingham's studio records at that time, spanning from 1981's Law and Order to 2011's Seeds We Sow. "Hunger" and "Ride This Road" were previously unreleased songs recorded in 2012. The most recent addition of the set is "Sleeping Around the Corner", from the 2017 duet album Lindsey Buckingham Christine McVie. Alternate editions of the set include an abridged single-disc version and a deluxe six-LP deluxe vinyl set.

One reviewer praised the contrast between some of Buckingham's more unusual material alongside some of his more commercial cuts potentially suitable for Fleetwood Mac, such as "Love Runs Deeper" and "You Do or You Don't". The unbalanced representation of Buckingham's solo records is criticized, noting that Out of the Cradle boasts eight tracks, while Law and Order has just one featured on the compilation.

== Track listing ==
All tracks written by Lindsey Buckingham, except where noted.

Disc one
No.	Title	Origin	Length
1.	"Don't Look Down"	Out of the Cradle, 1992	3:10
2.	"Go Insane"	Go Insane, 1984	2:47
3.	"Surrender the Rain" (Buckingham, Richard Dashut)	Out of the Cradle	3:30
4.	"Rock Away Blind"	Seeds We Sow, 2011	3:56
5.	"Holiday Road"	National Lampoon's Vacation soundtrack, 1983	2:10
6.	"Doing What I Can"	Out of the Cradle	3:45
7.	"Trouble"	Law and Order, 1981	3:34
8.	"I Must Go"	Go Insane	4:37
9.	"Street of Dreams" (Buckingham, Dashut)	Out of the Cradle	4:18
10.	"Soul Drifter"	Out of the Cradle	3:26
11.	"Show You How"	Under the Skin, 2006	4:20
12.	"Shut Us Down" (Live; Buckingham, Cordelia Sipper)	Under the Skin	5:30
13.	"Slow Dancing"	Go Insane	4:05
14.	"Countdown"	Out of the Cradle	3:21
15.	"Someone's Gotta Change Your Mind"	Under the Skin	4:48
16.	"In Our Own Time"	Seeds We Sow	4:21
17.	"Illumination"	Seeds We Sow	2:17
18.	"Gift of Screws"	Gift of Screws, 2008	2:51
19.	"Did You Miss Me" (Buckingham, Kristen Buckingham)	Gift of Screws	3:39
20.	"Down on Rodeo"	Under the Skin	4:15
21.	"Treason"	Gift of Screws	4:30

Disc two
No.	Title	Origin	Length
1.	"Hunger"	new song	2:22
2.	"Not Too Late"	Under the Skin	4:40
3.	"Sleeping Around the Corner"	Seeds We Sow (iTunes Store bonus track version), later re-recorded for Lindsey Buckingham Christine McVie, 2017	3:47
4.	"I Want You" (Buckingham, Gordon Fordyce)	Go Insane	3:20
5.	"Time Precious Time"	Gift of Screws	4:24
6.	"Stars Are Crazy" (Buckingham, Lisa Dewey)	Seeds We Sow	4:45
7.	"Love Runs Deeper" (Buckingham, K. Buckingham)	Gift of Screws	3:52
8.	"You Do or You Don't" (Buckingham, Dashut)	Out of the Cradle	3:36
9.	"I Am Waiting" (Mick Jagger, Keith Richards)	Under the Skin	3:33
10.	"Time Bomb Town" (Buckingham, Dashut)	Back to the Future soundtrack, 1985	2:44
11.	"Turn It On" (Buckingham, Dashut)	Out of the Cradle	3:49
12.	"Seeds We Sow"	Seeds We Sow	3:41
13.	"Underground"	Gift of Screws	2:59
14.	"Dancin' Across the USA"	National Lampoon's Vacation soundtrack	3:10
15.	"Gone Too Far"	Seeds We Sow	3:21
16.	"End of Time"	Seeds We Sow	3:55
17.	"D.W. Suite"	Go Insane	6:51
18.	"Ride This Road"	new song	2:45
19.	"Say We'll Meet Again"	Out of the Cradle	2:29

Disc three (Live)
No.	Title	Origin	Length
1.	"Trouble" (live at Saban Theatre, Beverly Hills, CA 2011)	Songs from the Small Machine	4:28
2.	"Go Insane" (live at Saban Theatre, Beverly Hills, CA 2011)	Songs from the Small Machine	4:45
3.	"Bleed to Love Her" (live at Hoyt Sherman Palace, Des Moines, IA 2012)	One Man Show	3:42
4.	"Stephanie" (live at Hoyt Sherman Palace, Des Moines, IA 2012)	One Man Show	2:19
5.	"Never Going Back Again" (live at Saban Theatre, Beverly Hills, CA 2011)	Songs from the Small Machine	4:39
6.	"Big Love" (live at Saban Theatre, Beverly Hills, CA 2011)	Songs from the Small Machine	3:11
7.	"Under the Skin" (live at Saban Theatre, Beverly Hills, CA 2011)	Songs from the Small Machine	4:03
8.	"All My Sorrows" (traditional; live at Saban Theatre, Beverly Hills, CA 2011)	Songs from the Small Machine	3:53
9.	"Cast Away Dreams" (live at The Bass Performance Hall 2008)	Live at the Bass Performance Hall	4:36
10.	"Holiday Road" (live at The Bass Performance Hall 2008)	Live at the Bass Performance Hall	3:08
11.	"Tusk" (live at Saban Theatre, Beverly Hills, CA 2011)	Songs from the Small Machine	4:24
12.	"I'm So Afraid" (live at Saban Theatre, Beverly Hills, CA 2011)	Songs from the Small Machine	8:05
13.	"Go Your Own Way" (live at Saban Theatre, Beverly Hills, CA 2011)	Songs from the Small Machine	5:48

== Personnel ==
Main artist

- Lindsey Buckingham – guitars, bass, keyboards, percussion, drums, programming, lap harp, vocals

Additional musicians

- Drums: Mick Fleetwood, Walfredo Reyes Jr., Michael Huey, Taku Hirano
- Bass: George Hawkins, Bryant Simpson, John McVie, Larry Klein, Buell Neidlinger, Brett Tuggle
- Keyboards: Mitchell Froom, Gordon Fordyce, Brett Tuggle, Lindsay Vannoy
- Percussion: Alex Acuña, Mick Fleetwood, Gordon Fordyce, Walfredo Reyes, Taku Hirano
- Rhythm guitars: Neale Heywood, Brett Tuggle (Disc 3)
- Backing vocals: Neale Heywood, Brett Tuggle

Production

- Producers: Lindsey Buckingham, Richard Dashut, Gordon Fordyce, Rob Cavallo, Mitchell Froom
- Composers: Lindsey Buckingham, Kristen Buckingham, Richard Dashut, Cordelia Sipper, Gordon Fordyce, Lisa Dewey
- Art direction: Rory Wilson
- Design: Rory Wilson
- Photography: Lindsey Buckingham, Kristen Buckingham, Richard Dashut, Deyo Glines, Scott Gruber, Sahil Mehta, John Russo, Kelly Sikkema, Rory Wilson
- Remastering: Stephen Marcussen
- Compilation: Lindsey Buckingham
- Project supervisors: Bill Inglot, Jason Day
- Project assistants: Susanne Savage, John Srebalus, Shannon Ward, Steve Wollard, Sheryl Farber
- Product manager: Liuba Shapiro
- Discographical annotation: Patrick Milligan

== Charts ==
Chart (2018)	Peak position
Belgian Albums (Ultratop Flanders)	114
Scottish Albums (Official Charts)	33
UK Albums (Official Charts)	78
US Billboard 200	53
