= This Is the Time (Lindsey Buckingham song) =

1992 song by Lindsey Buckingham

Song by Lindsey Buckingham

from the album Out of the Cradle
- Released: June 16, 1992
- Length: 4:49; 5:30 (full version with "Instrumental Introduction To")
- Label: Reprise; Mercury
- Songwriters: Lindsey Buckingham; Richard Dashut
- Producers: Lindsey Buckingham; Richard Dashut

"This Is the Time " is a song by Lindsey Buckingham that was released on his third solo album Out of the Cradle in 1992. The song is prefaced with a guitar instrumental that Buckingham played on a fretless Steinberger guitar. Performances of the song supporting the Out of the Cradle album featured an extended guitar solo from Buckingham and members of his touring band.

== Background ==
Similar to Buckingham's "Don't Look Down" from the same album, "This Is the Time" features an instrumental introduction that segues into the full song. Buckingham played this part on a fretless Steinberger. The fretless Steinberg was recorded in mono and treated with a variable speed oscillator. To achieve the guitar tones on the verses of "This Is the Time", Buckingham created open tunings on his Fender Stratocaster, stringing only high b and high e strings tuned half-whole steps apart from each other. Buckingham also played the song's guitar solo on the Stratocaster, which was recorded directly into the mixing console.

When discussing his material on Out of the Cradle with Paul Zollo, Buckingham identified "You Do Or You Don't" and "Soul Drifter" as being on the "mature side", which he contrasted with "This Is the Time", a song he believed that "someone my age has no business doing whatsoever." In relation to the song's lyrics, he told Bill Holdship of BAM magazine that "This Is the Time" could be considered a cynical political statement. Stereo Review characterized Buckingham's vocal delivery on portions of "This Is the Time" as a "robotic basso". Erik Rasmussen of The Capital Times thought that the song showcased Buckingham's "lyrical economy" and guitar playing.

== Live performances ==
Buckingham included "This is the Time" in the setlist for the tour promoting his Out of the Cradle album. It was generally positioned near the end of the set just before "Go Your Own Way". During these renditions, Buckingham and his accompanying touring guitarists would each trade guitar solos for four bars. Janet Robin, who was one of the guitarists in Buckingham's touring band, recalled that "This Is the Time" was one of the few moments in the setlist that gave the members an opportunity to improvise their parts.

During the ending of "This Is the Time", Jim Sullivan of The Boston Globe noted that "Buckingham and another guitarist [did] the old Blue Oyster Cult trick of guitar-necks-crossing-high in the air (shooting figurative sparks)." Mike Boehm of the Los Angeles Times mentioned that Buckingham "playfully rubbed his fret board against that of one of his cohorts, Janet Robin" during the song, which he likened to a "set-piece for guitar heroism" where he turned "his guitar squadron into a screaming relay team, each player carrying the solo baton in a game of pass-the-distortion." Robin mentioned that the idea of rolling around the stage during the song's climax was unplanned and that she and Buckingham "both just did it as a joke once in rehearsal and it became a 'thing' to do live."

Every guitarist in Buckingham's touring band, including Buckingham himself, played a solo on "This Is the Time" with the exception of Liza Carbe, who Robin said was a "great musician, just not a lead soloist by definition, hence her miss on that tune." Peter Howell of the Toronto Star called this component of the show "another nice touch", which he believed demonstrated the chemistry Buckingham had with the rest of his band onstage. Michael Snyder of the San Francisco Chronicle witnessed Buckingham's performance of "This Is the Time" at Bimbo's 365 Club and called the song a "hard-rock explosion". In his review of Buckingham's performance in New Britain, Connecticut, Kevin O'Hare wrote in The Republican that "This is the Time" was one of the few songs of the show that "drifted", but thought that it was "somewhat salvaged by [a] full-blown, raucous rock 'n' roll ending".

== Personnel ==
- Lindsey Buckingham – guitars, keyboards, drum programming, vocals
- Larry Klein – bass guitar
