= Wally World =

Wally World may refer to:

- Walmart, an American retail chain
- Walley World, a fictional theme park in the 1983 film National Lampoon's Vacation
