= This Is the Time =

This Is the Time may refer to:

- This Is the Time: The Christmas Album, a 1996 album by Michael Bolton
- "This Is the Time" (Billy Joel song), 1986
- "This Is the Time" (Lindsey Buckingham song), 1992
- "This Is the Time (Ballast)", a 2014 song by Nothing More
- "This Is the Time", a song by Epica (band)
