= Street of Dreams =

Street of Dreams may refer to:

== Film ==
- Street of Dreams (1988 film), a made-for-TV film
- Street of Dreams (Martin Sharp film), an unfinished documentary about Tiny Tim and the 1979 Ghost Train fire

== Music ==
- Street of Dreams (musical), based on Coronation Street
- Street of Dreams (Grant Green album), 1964
- Street of Dreams (Sofia Talvik album), 2007
- Street of Dreams, a 1979 album by Frank Carillo
- "Street of Dreams" (1932 song), recorded by several artist
- "Street of Dreams" (Guns N' Roses song), 2008
- "Street of Dreams" (Lindsey Buckingham song), 1992
- "Street of Dreams" (Rainbow song), 1983
- "Street of Dreams", a song by The Damned from the 1985 album Phantasmagoria
- "Street of Dreams" (U2 song), 2026

== Other uses ==
- Home tour event, sometimes branded as Street of Dreams, a building industry showcase of homes

== See also ==
- Street of Dreams arson fires, in Echo Lake, Washington, U.S., in 2008
