= Out of the Cradle =

Studio album by Lindsey Buckingham
- Released: June 16, 1992
- Recorded: 1988–1992
- Genres: Rock; new wave
- Length: 48:42
- Label: Reprise
- Producers: Lindsey Buckingham; Richard Dashut

Lindsey Buckingham chronology
Go Insane (1984)	Out of the Cradle (1992)	Under the Skin (2006)

Singles from Out of the Cradle
- 1. "Wrong" Released: May 5, 1992; 2. "Countdown" Released: July 1992 (UK); 3. "Soul Drifter" Released: November 1992; 4. "Don't Look Down" Released: April 1993

Out of the Cradle is the third solo studio album by American singer-songwriter Lindsey Buckingham. Released in 1992, it was Buckingham's first album after his departure from Fleetwood Mac, in 1987 (though Buckingham rejoined the band in 1997). He named the album after Walt Whitman's poem "Out of the Cradle Endlessly Rocking". The album reached No. 128 on the US Billboard 200 album chart, No. 51 on the UK Albums Chart, and No. 70 on the Canada Albums Chart.

Four singles were released from the album, with "Wrong" being album's first single in North America and "Countdown" being selected as the first single in Europe. All four singles reached the top 60 in Canada, with "Countdown" charting the highest at No. 29. In the United States, none of the singles charted on the Billboard Hot 100, although some of them did reach the Album Rock Tracks and Adult Contemporary chart. Ten of the songs on the album (counting "Instrumental Introduction To") were included on Solo Anthology: The Best of Lindsey Buckingham.

== Background ==
Upon his departure from Fleetwood Mac, Buckingham refrained from making music for six months. After this period, he returned to his home studio in Los Angeles, where he adopted a daily ten-twelve hour work schedule that began at 10 a.m. Buckingham mentioned that the arrangement at his home studio allowed him to spend additional time refining his material, which he considered to be a desirable working arrangement that allowed him to "tap into the potential" of his capabilities.

Richard Dashut, who worked with Buckingham on many Fleetwood Mac albums, helped co-produce and co-write much of the material on Out of the Cradle. Dashut served as a "sounding board" for Buckingham during the making of Out of the Cradle and offered input on how to approach some of the songs. Buckingham added that Dashut was "great with broad strokes and seeing the big picture" and said that he "tend[ed] to get lost in small details, so it's good to have him around". Throughout the sessions, Dashut provided feedback to Buckingham, who also received occasional visits from Warner Bros. Records executives to gauge the progress made on Out of the Cradle. Outside of a few session musicians, Buckingham opted to record most of the instruments himself using overdubbing. "When I left the group, I wasn't much interested in getting together with other musicians."

Buckingham said that the album title, which referred to Walt Whitman's 1874 poem "Out of the Cradle Endlessly Rocking", related both to his departure from Fleetwood Mac and "the child still rocking around inside of us after we become adults". For some of the lyrics, Buckingham took inspiration from Whitman's poems and the literary work of Dylan Thomas. He told BAM magazine that he wanted the album to challenge listeners while still remaining accessible.

== Composition and recording ==
When making Out of the Cradle, Buckingham decided to pivot away from synthesizers in favor of guitars. Buckingham specifically gravitated towards acoustic guitars on Out of the Cradle, particularly nylon-string guitars to make some of his denser compositions sound lighter, although he did utilize electric guitars when the song required it. On "This Is the Time" and "Wrong", Buckingham played a Fender Stratocaster and Telecaster respectively, with the latter song also featuring a guitar developed by Rick Turner.

All of the instruments were recorded directly into the mixing console in mono as opposed to stereo. Buckingham explained that he "wanted to create an aural soundstage where a listener could isolate certain sounds at certain points in each song, as opposed to ingesting a standard-issue stereo spread." Gated sounds and other audio effects were generally avoided during the recording process, although Buckingham doubled and tripled some parts to achieve a "squashed" sound.

I wanted to play more guitar. The first two records were much more Fairlight oriented and I didn't want to use that as much. I think for the first time, I tapped into my potential as a guitarist, bringing the guitar to the forefront.

One song, "Street of Dreams", had elements that date back to the mid-eighties. The middle section was written around 1985 and the verses were completed six years later. Buckingham said that other songs such as "Soul Drifter" took far less time to write, and noted that the song "was kind of blocked out and completed, words wise, before ever committing it to tape. It was done with a Tin-Pan Alley sensibility in mind." Some of the rhythm tracks on the album were programmed on a drum machine, which Buckingham "tried to keep as human and sloppy as possible".

Out of the Cradle contains multiple instrumental introductions to songs and two covers: "All My Sorrows" and "This Nearly Was Mine", the latter of which was a personal favorite of Buckingham's father. Buckingham took some liberties with his rendition of "All My Sorrows" by changing the chords and the melody, although he retained the lyrics. On "You Do or You Don't", an original composition, Buckingham quoted a melodic line from "Theme from A Summer Place" as it matched the emotional tone that he envisioned. "This Is the Time" and "Don't Look Down" were both prefaced with instrumental introductions rooted in classical music.

Buckingham recorded roughly twice the number of songs that ultimately appeared on the final album. This provided him the opportunity place particular attention into the album sequencing, allowing him to "pick and choose the songs that would hang together". One song from the recording sessions was "Make Me a Mask", which Buckingham deemed unsuitable for inclusion on Out of the Cradle as he felt that it did not fit in with the rest of the tracks; he instead gave the song to Fleetwood Mac for inclusion on their 1992 box set, 25 Years – The Chain.

== Release ==
Walter Egan created the album's woodcuts, which he gifted to Buckingham as a Christmas present prior to the assembling of the album's packaging. Some of Buckingham's family photos were also included in the liner notes. The photo of Buckingham with various recording gear and a black velvet shrine of Elvis Presley was taken at his home recording studio.

In support of the album, Buckingham embarked on his first solo tour. Initially, Buckingham contemplated the idea of creating a live show that "fell somewhere between Frank Sinatra and Laurie Anderson." He also expressed interest in surrounding himself with a bassist and drummer that could enable him to "develop the guitar sound — almost in a jazz way." Buckingham ultimately opted to assemble an ensemble with four guitarists in addition to himself, three percussionists, a bassist, and a keyboardist who also triggered various samples. Once he assembled his band, Buckingham and his manager booked two nights at The Coach House in San Juan Capistrano, California. After these unadvertised shows were sold out, Lenny Waronker, who was the president of Warner Records, decided to book a tour for Buckingham. In December 1992, Buckingham and his touring band had one of their performances filmed for a VH1 Center Stage program.

Four promotional music videos were shot for Out of the Cradle, with "Wrong" being the first one that was filmed and released. According to Buckingham, it was the decision of the record label to create this video first. He commented that "I was very surprised that the record company chose that song, because it's on the strange side. I think the company feels this album has a lot of depth to it, and maybe what we need to do is not shoot for the obvious one right away". "Countdown" was the next music video that was released, which Buckingham directed himself. Other music videos were also created for "Soul Drifter" and "Don't Look Down". As of 2019, Lindsey Buckingham has released all four of these videos to his official YouTube channel.

== Critical reception ==
Professional ratings
Review scores
Source	Rating
AllMusic	4/5 stars
Chicago Tribune	4/4 stars
Robert Christgau	(dud)
The Encyclopedia of Popular Music	2/5 stars
Los Angeles Times	3/4 stars
MusicHound Rock: The Essential Album Guide	5/5 stars
The Rolling Stone Album Guide	4/5 stars

Greg Kot of The Chicago Tribune praised Out of the Cradle as "a dazzling sonic feast, showing Buckingham's range as a balladeer, rocker and Tin Pan Alley-style craftsman" while emphasizing that "the album is not lacking for rock 'n' roll spark. It's far more diverse than his two earlier solo albums, and more quirkily intriguing than his generally streamlined work with the post-Tusk Fleetwood Mac." Stephen Holden of The New York Times hailed Out of the Cradle as one of the ten best albums of the year, calling it an "exquisitely produced studio artifact." The Los Angeles Times wrote that "it's impossible to miss the meaning of Out of the Cradle: the primacy of the guitar as an expressive instrument."

The Washington Post declared: "The album's stories are told with music, and only Brian Wilson, Stevie Wonder, Paul McCartney and a handful of others have made rock-and-roll as rich and powerful as this." Stereo Review labeled Out of the Cradle as the best recordings of the month in the August 1992 edition of the publication. They said that the album demonstrated "how essential Lindsey Buckingham's glossy but edgy arrangements were" to Fleetwood Mac and his efforts resulted in "richly melodic pop tunes that effortlessly unspool with soaring clarity and vivid atmosphere."

RPM called the album a "superb package of middle-of-the-road rock" that "does justice to Buckingham's vocal smoothness." The pan-European magazine Music & Media believed that every song on the album was "a potential summer hit" and identified "Countdown", "Don't Look Down", and "Doing What I Can" as having particularly promising chart potential.

Of "Say We'll Meet Again", Magnet wrote that "Buckingham's Beach Boys/Les Paul & Mary Ford fascination manifests itself on this spare and breezy ballad, which closes Out of the Cradle in most gentle fashion." Matthew Greenwald of AllMusic would later write that along with Michael Nesmith's Tropical Campfires, Out of the Cradle "may be one of the finest and most underrated albums of the 1990s." Mark Coleman would also write in The Rolling Stone Album Guide that the album had Buckingham's "strongest hooks since [Fleetwood Mac's] Rumours...On catchy song after song, the sonic details flesh out the deceptively simple melodies."

In The Village Voice's annual Pazz & Jop critics' poll for the year's best albums, Out of the Cradle finished at number 33.

== Track listing ==
All tracks written by Lindsey Buckingham and Richard Dashut except where noted.

No.	Title	Length
1.	"Instrumental Introduction To:" (Buckingham)	0:25
2.	"Don't Look Down" (Buckingham)	2:47
3.	"Wrong"	4:19
4.	"Countdown" (Buckingham)	3:21
5.	"All My Sorrows" (The Kingston Trio)	4:01
6.	"Soul Drifter" (Buckingham)	3:27
7.	"Instrumental Introduction To"	0:41
8.	"This Is the Time"	4:49
9.	"You Do or You Don't"	3:37
10.	"Street of Dreams"	4:28
11.	"Spoken Introduction To"	0:46
12.	"Surrender the Rain"	3:36
13.	"Doing What I Can" (Buckingham)	4:05
14.	"Turn It On"	3:50
15.	"This Nearly Was Mine" (Richard Rodgers, Oscar Hammerstein)	1:36
16.	"Say We'll Meet Again" (Buckingham, Robert Aguirre)	2:28

== Personnel ==
Main performer

- Lindsey Buckingham – vocals, guitars, keyboards, synthesizers, bass, percussion, programming

Additional personnel

- Larry Klein – bass (8, 9, 12)
- Alex Acuña – percussion (9, 12)
- Buell Neidlinger – bass (10)
- Mitchell Froom – organ (14)

Production

- Lindsey Buckingham – producer, recording, Polaroid art
- Richard Dashut – producer, recording, Polaroid art
- Greg Droman – recording
- Kevin Killen – recording
- Eric Rudd – recording assistant
- Chris Lord-Alge – mixing
- Lori Fumar – mix assistant
- Talley Sherwood – mix assistant
- Bob Ludwig – mastering
- Masterdisk (New York City, New York) – mastering location
- Andy Engel – package design
- Greg Gorman – photography
- Ron Slenzak – photography
- Guzman – photography
- Walter Egan – woodcuts
- Michael Brokaw Management – management

== Charts ==
Chart (1992)	Peak position
Australian Albums (ARIA)	135
Canada Top Albums/CDs (RPM)	70
Dutch Albums (Album Top 100)	57
Swedish Albums (Sverigetopplistan)	28
UK Albums (Official Charts)	51
US Billboard 200	128
US Cash Box Top 200 Albums	93
