= Lindsey Buckingham (album) =

Studio album by Lindsey Buckingham
- Released: September 17, 2021
- Genre: Rock
- Length: 36:33
- Label: Reprise
- Producer: Lindsey Buckingham

Lindsey Buckingham chronology
Solo Anthology: The Best of Lindsey Buckingham (2018)	Lindsey Buckingham (2021)

Singles from Lindsey Buckingham
- 1. "I Don't Mind" Released: June 8, 2021; 2. "On the Wrong Side" Released: July 23, 2021; 3. "Scream" Released: September 1, 2021

Lindsey Buckingham is the seventh solo studio album by American guitarist, vocalist, and former Fleetwood Mac member Lindsey Buckingham. The album was released on September 17, 2021. Written, produced, and recorded by Buckingham at his home studio in Los Angeles, the album was released via vinyl, CD, and on digital and streaming services.

The album was announced June 8, 2021, alongside the release of the album's lead single "I Don't Mind". The album's second single, "On the Wrong Side", was released on July 23, 2021. A third single, "Scream", was released on September 1, 2021.

Buckingham launched a US tour to support the album, starting in September 2021. This was his first tour since he underwent open heart surgery in 2019. He was supposed to return to touring in 2020, but the plans were canceled due to the ongoing COVID-19 pandemic.

== Background ==
According to Buckingham, the album was fully complete in 2018, but he decided to temporarily shelve the album and release Solo Anthology: The Best of Lindsey Buckingham that year instead. The studio album, which was tentatively titled "Blue Light", was subsequently planned for a 2019 release. Buckingham was preparing a tour to promote the album in early 2019, but underwent open heart surgery before the start of the tour. The album was delayed again in 2020 due to the COVID-19 pandemic.

Most of the songs on Lindsey Buckingham began as voice memos on Buckingham's phone containing "seeds of ideas". Buckingham commented that his goal was to create a pop album with "songs that resemble art more than pop". The songs were recorded on a Sony 48-track reel-to-reel at Buckingham's home studio. His cover of "Time", originally recorded by the Pozo-Seco Singers, was the first song that he recorded for the album. Buckingham opted not to use Pro Tools as he felt that his recording method of using reel-to-reel audio tape recording with a variable speed oscillator was sufficient.

Most of the drums on the album were played by hand on a keyboard, although his favorite tracks on the album, "Swan Song" and "Power Down", featured a set of electronic drum loops. The rhythmic patterns on "Swan Song" and "Power Down" incorporated different sections of the same multitrack drum loop. "I wanted to do something that felt a little more techno, and the drum loops were just a great starting point and pretty much led to everything else. It was a way of having a little slap across the face just when you thought the album might be a little too pretty."

On "Scream", Buckingham eschewed a standard drum kit by instead experimenting with found sounds, including the front of his recording console, which he tapped with his hands. Buckingham used a Roland guitar synthesizer for the solos on "Power Down" and "On the Wrong Side". He said that "On the Wrong Side" was "about trying to regain my center that might have been momentarily been lost through the travails of the band." When discussing the song "Santa Rosa", Buckingham mentioned that his wife had wanted to move their family to a horse ranch in Santa Rosa Valley, California, which inspired the lyrics.

== Release ==
On June 8, 2021, a release date of September 17 was confirmed for Lindsey Buckingham through the Reprise Records label. This announcement was accompanied by the release of its first single, "I Don't Mind", which Buckingham said was about "the challenges couples face in long-term relationships". By August 2021, Buckingham had begun preparations for a 30-date tour in the United State States, where he rehearsed at a warehouse in Brentwood, Los Angeles.

The tour began on September 1, 2021 in Milwaukee and concluded on December 20 in Boulder. This marked Buckingham's first tour since he underwent open heart surgery in February 2019. The setlist included songs from his time with Fleetwood Mac, including "Big Love", "Never Going Back Again", and "Go Your Own Way", along with songs from his solo career, including "Soul Drifter" and "Time", the latter of which served as the final song of the encore. He also played "Love is Here to Stay" from his 2017 Lindsey Buckingham Christine McVie collaboration album.

In November 2021, Jordon Zadorozny and Brad Laner were given songwriting credits for "Swan Song" after the former discovered lyrical similarities with the chorus of the song "Mind's Eye". Buckingham had produced a couple of tracks for them in 2000 at The Village Studio where Tusk was recorded. After the studio session, Laner gave Buckingham a CD with songs he had co-written with Zadorozny, with one of those being "Mind's Eye". Buckingham later recorded a demo of the song, which he rediscovered while compiling material for his eponymous album, but forgot that Zadorozny and Laner had written it.

Around the conclusion of Buckingham's North American tour, Buckingham, Zadorozny, and Laner amicably agreed upon legal paperwork that granted the latter two songwriting credits, a percentage of the publishing, and a flat sum of money. Neither Zadorozny nor Laner harbored any resentment over the misunderstanding, with Zadorozny saying that "I'm grateful to Lindsey for rediscovering this piece of music and I love what he did with it."

== Critical reception ==
Professional ratings
Review scores
Source	Rating
AllMusic	4.5/5 stars
NME	4/5 stars
Paste	7.0/10
Pitchfork	7.0/10

At Metacritic, which assigns a weighted average rating out of 100 to reviews from mainstream publications, the album received a score of 79, based on 13 reviews. Greil Marcus praised the album, writing that "everything here sings with delight. There’s pleasure in music-making that gives Buckingham’s confident, all-the-time-in-the-world singing a lift right out of 'Blind Love,' a doo-wop ballad that sounds like something he and his high school friends made up while cruising up and down the San Francisco Peninsula instead of doing homework."

Rhys Buchanan wrote in NME that "even the most casual Fleetwood Mac fans won’t have to look hard to uncover the band’s classic hallmarks, which are dotted all over the listen...The album bustles with defiant spirit while leaning heavily on deeply catchy songwriting and production. And with Mick Fleetwood having reconciled with Buckingham back in March, it’s exactly the kind of triumphant return that could give his old band food for thought."

== Track listing ==
All tracks written by Lindsey Buckingham, except where indicated.

Lindsey Buckingham track listing
No.	Title	Writer(s)	Length
1.	"Scream"		2:11
2.	"I Don't Mind"		4:05
3.	"On the Wrong Side"		3:36
4.	"Swan Song"	Buckingham, Jordon Zadorozny, Brad Laner	3:27
5.	"Blind Love"		3:47
6.	"Time"	Michael Merchant	3:56
7.	"Blue Light"		3:24
8.	"Power Down"		3:54
9.	"Santa Rosa"		4:24
10.	"Dancing"		3:49
Total length:			36:33

== Personnel ==
- Lindsey Buckingham – electric and acoustic guitars, guitar synthesizer, bass guitar, synthesizer bass, keyboards, percussion, drum programming, vocals

Production

- Lindsey Buckingham – performance, mixing, producer, engineering
- Mark Needham – mixing
- Stephen Marcussen – mastering
- Liz Hirsch – design, layout
- John Russo – photography

== Charts ==
Chart performance for Lindsey Buckingham
Chart (2021)	Peak position
Belgian Albums (Ultratop Flanders)	57
Belgian Albums (Ultratop Wallonia)	173
German Albums (Offizielle Top 100)	37
Irish Albums (IRMA)	65
Scottish Albums (Official Charts)	6
Swiss Albums (Schweizer Hitparade)	60
UK Albums (Official Charts)	25
US Top Album Sales (Billboard)	13
US Top Rock Albums (Billboard)	37
