= Wrong (Lindsey Buckingham song) =

Single by Lindsey Buckingham

from the album Out of the Cradle
- Released: May 5, 1992
- Genre: Rock
- Length: 4:19
- Label: Reprise
- Songwriters: Lindsey Buckingham; Richard Dashut
- Producers: Lindsey Buckingham; Richard Dashut

Lindsey Buckingham singles chronology
"Slow Dancing" (1984)	"Wrong" (1992)	"Countdown" (1992)

"Wrong" is a song by Lindsey Buckingham, released in 1992 from his third solo album Out of the Cradle. In North America, "Wrong" was the album's first single, although in Europe, "Countdown" was released instead. In May 1992, "Wrong" was serviced to album-oriented rock radio stations; a music video was also created to coincide with the release of the single.

== Composition and recording ==
In a 1992 interview with the Los Angeles Times, Buckingham said that he wrote "Wrong" about "a composite number of people that I know who've fallen into the pitfalls of the trappings of the biz." The publication speculated that the song was instead primarily a rebuke of Fleetwood's memoir, which included a passage disputed by Buckingham about the circumstances behind his departure from Fleetwood Mac. The following year, Buckingham recounted a story of him overhearing Fleetwood singing the words to "Wrong" in the recording studio while the two were assembling Fleetwood Mac's box set, 25 Years – The Chain; Buckingham believed that Fleetwood was aware of the song's subject matter based on this interaction.

Buckingham confirmed in a 2018 interview with Stereogum that "Wrong" was a response to Mick Fleetwood's first memoir, My Life And Adventures In Fleetwood Mac. "He [Fleetwood] came out with his book, and it was just kind of a real trashy thing...He doesn’t have a mechanism for self-editing in that way or perhaps discerning where the line is". The song goes through a list of Buckingham's grievances with Fleetwood, including his appearance on Puttin' on the Hits, which Buckingham felt "created the wrong visibility" for Fleetwood.

To achieve the metallic guitar tone on "Wrong", Buckingham applied treble to a gut string guitar, which was connected directly to the recording console. He also used a Fender Telecaster and a guitar developed by Rick Turner, the latter of which was recorded directly into a distorted preamp and "came off sounding like elephants mating" according to Buckingham.

== Release ==
Billboard announced that the song would be serviced to AOR stations on May 19, 1992. Buckingham was surprised that his record company picked "Wrong" as the album's first single; he wanted "Don't Look Down" to fulfill that role instead.

For the week dated May 29, 1992, Radio & Records reported that the song received 30 adds to AOR stations, which was enough for the song to debut at number 59 on the publication's listing of the top AOR tracks. 80 AOR stations had the song in their playlist for the week dated June 26, 1992 – an increase of 15 over the previous week, making it the eighth most added song in that format. For the July 17, 1992 edition of Radio & Records, "Wrong" was ranked 15th on the publication's list of the top AOR tracks, with 64 percent of reporting stations in that format playing the song. "Wrong" did not chart on the Billboard Hot 100 and instead reached number 23 on the Mainstream Rock chart. "Wrong" was listed as a "hit add" on the July 4, 1992 edition of Canada's RPM trade magazine and debuted at number 79 on the singles chart that same week. Later that month, it peaked at number 50 on the Canadian singles chart.

"Wrong" was performed a few times during the Out of the Cradle tour, although it was later dropped from the setlist due to the band's belief that the song did not translate well to a live setting. In the song's music video, which was directed by Julien Temple, Buckingham engages in a series of guitar duels with doppelgängers emerging from a mirror. Buckingham described it as "a fun romp whose narrative pits an artist who values integrity against his own alter ego driven by baser instincts, cheered on by a boardroom of mercenary executives watching from the sidelines."

== Critical reception ==
Cashbox said that "Wrong" had "many recognizable Mac traits, as well as his own signature guitar style". Billboard described the song as "uptempo" and "feverish". Stereo Review highlighted Buckingham's "neurotic falsetto" vocals, believing that they created a "dramatic effect". J.D. Considine of Rolling Stone characterized "Wrong" as the only song on Out of the Cradle "explicitly addressing the music business."

The New York Times interpreted the song as providing "a look at music industry crassness". Jean Rosenbluth of the Los Angeles Times seconded this analysis and wrote that "the vitriol in 'Wrong' about the business of being a rock star, comes through best in the vocals". BAM magazine called "Wrong" "a wailing, dark view of classic rock stardom and the 'biz'". In a retrospective analysis of Out of the Cradle, Michael Roberts of Westword identified "Wrong" as one of the few unreserved songs on the album and labeled it as a "biting music-biz exorcism".

== Personnel ==
- Lindsey Buckingham – guitars, bass, keyboards, drum and percussion programming, vocals

== Charts ==
Chart (1992)	Peak position
Canada Top Singles (RPM)	50
US Mainstream Rock (Billboard)	23
US AOR Tracks (Radio & Records)	15
