= On the Wrong Side =

Single by Lindsey Buckingham

from the album Lindsey Buckingham
- Released: July 23, 2021
- Genre: Rock
- Length: 3:36
- Label: Reprise
- Songwriter(s): Lindsey Buckingham
- Producer(s): Lindsey Buckingham

Lindsey Buckingham singles chronology
"I Don't Mind" (2021)	"On the Wrong Side" (2021)	"Scream" (2021)

"On the Wrong Side" is a song by American vocalist and guitarist Lindsey Buckingham from his eponymous seventh solo studio album Lindsey Buckingham. It was released on July 23, 2021, as the second single ahead of the album's release in September 2021.

"On the Wrong Side" was one of the five songs from the album that he played on his accompanying tour. Buckingham also performed the song on Late Night with Stephen Colbert on September 16, 2021, one day before the release of Buckingham's eponymous album.

This is the second Buckingham song titled "On the Wrong Side". His first was recorded for the 1994 With Honors soundtrack.

== Background ==
"On the Wrong Side" is both musically and lyrically inspired by Buckingham's former band Fleetwood Mac, which Buckingham left in 2018. The song details the long and eventful relationship between him and the band as well as the ups and downs of life on the road.

According to Buckingham, the song "evokes 'Go Your Own Way,' in that it's not a happy song, subject-matter wise, but it was an ebullient song musically. This was sort of the same idea." He said that the connection between the two songs can be found in their "tone, vocals, and guitar solos".

== Critical reception ==
Tom Breihan of Stereogum characterized the song as "a mellow but propulsive folk-rock tune with some seriously impressive guitar work" and thought that the song's harmonies were "Mac-worthy". Ryan Reed of Ultimate Classic Rock said that the song "purposely balances sprightly music and downcast lyrics". Greil Marcus commented that Buckingham's vocals on the track "seem to get younger verse by verse, years flying off the calendar backward to the beat."

Rhys Buchanan of NME called the song a "rhythmic anthem" with a "soaring emotionally charged guitar solo". Paste, which referred to the song as "On the Right Side", felt that the chorus was "classic Fleetwood Mac, stacked to the heavens with vocals on vocals" and that "the entire thing feels more melancholic than what Buckingham is used to making." They mentioned that the decision to conclude the song with a guitar solo and fade-out made it a "fitting image to pair with this album".

== Release history ==
Region	Date	Format	Label	Ref.
Various	July 23, 2021	Digital download; streaming	Reprise	
