= I Don't Mind (Lindsey Buckingham song) =

Single by Lindsey Buckingham

from the album Lindsey Buckingham
- Released: June 8, 2021
- Genre: Rock
- Length: 4:06
- Label: Reprise
- Songwriter: Lindsey Buckingham
- Producer: Lindsey Buckingham

Lindsey Buckingham singles chronology
| "The End of Time" (2011) | "I Don't Mind" (2021) | "On the Wrong Side" (2021) |

"I Don't Mind" is a song by American vocalist and guitarist Lindsey Buckingham from the eponymous seventh solo studio album Lindsey Buckingham. It was released on June 8, 2021, as the lead single from the album, which was announced simultaneously. Buckingham also performed the song live in support of his self-titled album, where he positioned it as the 12th song in the setlist.

== Background ==
"I Don't Mind" is Buckingham's first single release since "The End of Time" from the album Seeds We Sow, released in 2011. It is also his first single released following his departure from the British-American rock band Fleetwood Mac in 2018.

According to Buckingham, the song is about "the challenges couples face in long-term relationships." He added that "over time, two people inevitably find the need to augment their initial dynamic with one of flexibility, an acceptance of each others' flaws, and a willingness to continually work on issues; it is the essence of a good long-term relationship. This song celebrates that spirit and discipline."

== Critical reception ==
Writing for Stereogum, Tom Breihan noted the song's "driving beat" and thought that the instrument playing the main riff sonically resembled a harpsichord. In his review for NME, Rhs Buchanan called "I Don't Mind" one of the most "enchanting moments" on Buckingham's self-titled solo album and said that the "elegant" lyrics reflected the "compromise of a long-term relationship." Alfred Soto of Pitchfork believed that "I Don't Mind" evoked the "touch-activated pitch experiments he mastered on Tango in the Night's 'Big Love'". Record Collector labeled "I Don't Mind" as "jangly guitar pop" and called it one of the highlights on the album. John Bergstrom wrote in his review for PopMatters that the "breathy vocals and minor chords" of "I Don't Mind" provided the song with a "sense of unease below the pristine surface."

== Release history ==
| Region | Date | Format | Label | Ref. |
|---|---|---|---|---|
| Various | June 8, 2021 | Digital download; streaming | Reprise | |
