= Street of Dreams (Lindsey Buckingham song) =

1992 song by Lindsey Buckingham

Song by Lindsey Buckingham

from the album Out of the Cradle
- Released: June 16, 1992
- Recorded: Mid 1980s - 1992
- Length: 4:28
- Label: Reprise; Mercury
- Songwriters: Lindsey Buckingham; Richard Dashut

"Street of Dreams" is the tenth song on Lindsey Buckingham's third solo album, Out of the Cradle, which was released in 1992. Buckingham co-wrote "Street of Dreams" with Richard Dashut, who had served as a co-producer on several Fleetwood Mac albums beginning with the Rumours album. The song features bass work from Buell Neidlinger, with Buckingham providing the remaining instrumentation.

Buckingham performed the song on the album's accompanying tour without accompaniment from the rest of his backing band. In 2018, the song was also included on his compilation album Solo Anthology: The Best of Lindsey Buckingham.

== Background ==
In an interview with Johnnie Walker on BBC Radio One, Buckingham said that "Street of Dreams" was a song about the loneliness he experienced after the death of his father. Buckingham's father, Morris, was an owner of Alexander-Balart Coffee Co, a wholesale coffee business in San Francisco. In February 1974, Morris Buckingham died after suffering a heart attack. Buckingham began writing the song in the mid-1980s, starting with the lyrics in the bridge section. These lyrics related to visits he made to his father's burial site, where he imagined the advice that his father would give.

I'm imagining myself at the cemetery where my father is buried and talking to him, because my father had passed away about a year before we joined Fleetwood Mac. Stevie and I had already moved down to LA, but we hadn't become successful yet. I was imagining myself talking to him, asking him, 'Will I ever stop trying to attain this particular sensibility?' In my head, he's looking at me going, 'No, you're always going to be that person, dummy.' That's what the song is about.

In a 2018 interview with Stereogum, Buckingham also characterized the song as an evaluation and examination of choices and the determination not to be influenced by how others define him. He felt that the lyrics in the bridge addressed his pursuit of manifesting his dreams and the loneliness that can accompany that process, saying "it's about the exercise and the discipline and the essence of dreaming dreams and acting on those." Buckingham returned to the song during the recording sessions for Out of the Cradle and finished the song by adding the verses. He said that the 'I was praying you'd be staying' lyric was about his attempts at finding someone to provide him with love and support. Buckingham reflected that it was "interesting how you can have a piece laying around for so long and suddenly have it click into something that's current." He also said that the protracted writing process for "Street of Dreams" was an anomaly on Out of the Cradle and that other songs were composed in less of a piecemeal manner.

Musically, "Street of Dreams" utilizes a melody that invokes the minor second on several occasions. Buell Neidlinger, a jazz bassist, played on "Street of Dreams"; Buckingham thought that his additions were responsible for providing the song with a "musician-y subtext". The song also features rain effects, which Buckingham likened to the sound of a ride cymbal in providing another rhythmic component. Buckingham considered the song to be a companion piece to his cover of "This Nearly Was Mine" from the South Pacific soundtrack, which he recorded as a tribute to his father.

== Critical reception ==
In his review for The New York Times, Stephen Holden labeled "Street of Dreams" as "the most anguished song on Lindsey Buckingham's third solo album" and also discussed the song's "tormented father-son dialogue" that was "cast in a dank, echoey setting that suggests Elvis Presley's "Heartbreak Hotel" transformed into a surreal dirge. Chris Williamson of the Los Angeles Times called "Street of Dreams" a "brooding" song that addresses the death of Buckingham's father. Writing for Entertainment Weekly, Ken Tucker characterized "Street of Dreams" as "a song about immobilizing paranoia set to a gravely beautiful melody." The Independent called the song "quite eerie but hugely atmospheric". Ken Richardson of Audio magazine noted how the "persistent drizzle" on the song later "becomes a soaking shower of rain and guitar".

== Other appearances ==
Buckingham performed "Street of Dreams" live on his tour promoting Out of the Cradle. At his show in San Francisco, Buckingham dedicated "Street of Dreams" to his mother and other family members in the audience and discussed the impact that his father had on him. Geoffrey Himes reviewed Buckingham's set at The Bayou in The Washington Post and singled out "Street of Dreams" as one of the songs in the setlist from the Out of the Cradle album that "boasted melodic themes too pleasurable to be denied." "Street of Dreams" was one of the eight songs on Out of the Cradle included on Buckingham's 2018 compilation album Solo Anthology: The Best of Lindsey Buckingham. That same year, Buckingham performed "Street of Dreams" live for the first time since 1993.

== Personnel ==
- Lindsey Buckingham – guitar, vocals, sound effects
- Buell Neidlinger – upright bass
