= Don't Look Down (Lindsey Buckingham song) =

Single by Lindsey Buckingham

from the album Out of the Cradle
- Released: 1993
- Genre: Rock
- Length: 2:47; 3:12 (full version with "Instrumental Introduction To")
- Label: Reprise
- Songwriter: Lindsey Buckingham
- Producers: Lindsey Buckingham, Richard Dashut

Lindsey Buckingham singles chronology
"Soul Drifter" (1992)	"Don't Look Down" (1993)	"Twisted" (1996)

"Don't Look Down" is a song by Lindsey Buckingham, released in 1993 as the final single from his third solo album Out of the Cradle. It charted in Canada, where it peaked at number 59. Buckingham also performed the song live on the album's accompanying tour from 1992 to 1993. The song is prefaced by an instrumental introduction that segues into the main song. "Don't Look Down" was included on Buckingham's 2018 compilation album Solo Anthology: The Best of Lindsey Buckingham with both the instrumental introduction and main song combined into one track.

== Background ==
On "Don't Look Down", Buckingham decided against using a standard drum kit, instead opting to record some rhythms on cardboard boxes. The vocal cadence on "Don't Look Down" follows a 1:1 motion-to-rest ratio over the course of four measures, with the melodic activity occurring for two measures and ending on the downbeat of the third bar. Buckingham saw the song as a demonstration of "musical cubism" where "the shapes of the choruses [are] broken down into facets, much like a Picasso painting." An instrumental guitar passage, which was played on a Takamine acoustic-electric guitar, leads into the song's main riff. The acoustic-electric Takamine guitar was recorded directly into the recording console and the audio signal was doubled onto both the left and right channels.

Buckingham commented that live performances of "Don't Look Down" varied in quality depending on the acoustics of the performance venue and the mixing levels. "It fits together like a jigsaw, and its impact hinges on the level of things in relationship to each other, [such as] the vocals coming in loud enough. Certain things have to be really close to being right, at least in my mind, for it to come off." The song was performed during his 1992-93 tour promoting his Out of the Cradle album, where he was accompanied onstage by four guitarists, three drummers/percussionists, a bassist, and a keyboardist. He performed the song during his 2008 tour at the insistence of Brett Tuggle, who served as one of Buckingham's touring musicians during this time.

== Release ==
Buckingham originally wanted "Don't Look Down" to be the album's first single, although it was overlooked in favor of "Wrong" in North America and "Countdown" in Europe. The song received airplay on Adult album alternative radio stations in 1992 and ranked No. 22 on the "Focus 50 Adult Alternative Airplay" chart published by The Hard Report during the week of August 28, 1992.

After the first few singles from Out of the Cradle failed to chart on the Billboard Hot 100, Warner Bros decided to lift "Don't Look Down" as the album's next single to coincide with its accompanying tour. An advertisement promoting the single was included in the April 9, 1993 edition of Radio & Records. That same week, "Don't Look Down" was among the most added song to adult contemporary radio stations. "Don't Look Down" ultimately did not appear on the Billboard Adult Contemporary chart unlike some of Buckingham's other singles from Out of the Cradle.

"Don't Look Down" was listed as a "hit add" on the June 19, 1993 edition of the Canadian music-industry publication RPM and debuted at No. 79 on the Canadian singles chart. By early July, the song peaked at number 59, which it held for two weeks.

The music video for "Don't Look Down" was recorded with Buckingham's touring band and took around 15 hours to film. Janet Robin, who was one of the guitarists on the Out of the Cradle tour, recalled that Buckingham was involved in making creative decisions for certain shots in the video. Buckingham opted to stage the music video in a documentary style and had it filmed while on tour.

== Critical reception ==
Stereo Review wrote that the song begins "with a crisp, pseudo-classical, acoustic-guitar intro that collapses into a tumble of notes before the actual song kicks in with a well-oiled, bossa-flavored beat." Timothy White of Billboard said that the song falls "well within rock's melodic tradition" and features "eccentric constructions and sudden harmonic shifts, each surprise element enhancing their overall appeal." Cashbox identified "a hefty dose of Fleetwood Mac production quality" on "Don't Look Down". They felt that Buckingham made "clever use of stereo vocal samples and other familiar production gimmicks" that he had utilized during his time with the band.

BAM described "Don't Look Down" as "an ode to hope" that should "appeal to an alternative audience." J.D. Considine of Rolling Stone thought that "the song effortlessly captures the balance between languor and lift found in many Fleetwood Mac singles, flowing easily from the measured cadences of the verse to the manic climax of the chorus. Buckingham doesn't stop there, though; he fills the track with all sorts of ear candy, from Mexicali string-band flourishes to sampled voices that bounce the tune along like pinball bumpers."

The Capital Times highlighted the song's "quirky touches" and thought the song was "instantly hummable", positing that the song "succeeds not only because of [its] melodicism, but also because that sound conveys the lyrics' wide-eyed optimism." Philadelphia Daily News stated that "a track like "Don't Look Down" contains a virtual hologram of hooks. Falsetto backup vocals hang in the air over cushiony rhythms, while sprightly guitar lines float in between them." In his review for The Orlando Sentinel Parry Gettleman highlighted the "lovely acoustic guitar work" on the song's intro and the variation in Buckingham's voice, which he said went from "breezy to commanding". Stephen Holden wrote in The New York Times that the song opens Out of the Cradle with a sense of "frightened euphoria".

== Personnel ==
- Lindsey Buckingham – guitars, bass, percussion, rhythm programming, vocals

== Chart performance ==
Chart (1993)	Peak position
Canada Top Singles (RPM)	59
