= Countdown (Lindsey Buckingham song) =

Single by Lindsey Buckingham

from the album Out of the Cradle
- B-side: "This Nearly Was Mine"
- Released: July 1992
- Genre: Rock
- Length: 3:21
- Label: Reprise (North America); Mercury (Europe)
- Songwriter: Lindsey Buckingham
- Producers: Lindsey Buckingham; Richard Dashut

Lindsey Buckingham US singles chronology
"Wrong" (1992)	"Countdown" (1992)	"Soul Drifter" (1992)

Lindsey Buckingham UK singles chronology
"Slow Dancing" (1984)	"Countdown" (1992)	"Soul Drifter" (1992)

"Countdown" is a song written and performed by Lindsey Buckingham. It was included as the fourth track on his third solo album, Out of the Cradle, released in 1992. "Countdown" was released in July as the album's first single in Europe, although in North America, "Wrong" was released as the first single instead. Upon its release, "Countdown" charted in several countries, including Canada, Germany, the Netherlands, and the United States. The song was later included on Buckingham's 2018 compilation album Solo Anthology: The Best of Lindsey Buckingham.

== Background ==
Buckingham recorded his guitar parts on a Fender Telecaster with fuzz and a variable speed oscillator (VSO). Buckingham was inspired to make the guitar on "Countdown" sound like a violin after watching a classical concert. After playing his guitar part, he used a VSO to slow down the speed of the tape recorder, which in Buckingham's estimation provided a "crystalline" quality to the guitar. During the mixing process, producer Tom Lord-Alge attempted to thicken the sound of the guitar, although Buckingham convinced him to abandon the idea and insisted that the instrument should "sting like a bee."

During the week dated August 1, 1992, the UK publication Music Week listed "Countdown" at number 40 on its airplay chart. The song received the most airplay on BBC Radio 1 and the Chiltern Radio Network. Later that month, a music video for "Countdown" was released, which Buckingham directed himself.

For the week of August 15, 1992, "Countdown" was the fifth most added song to European contemporary hit radio stations reporting to Music & Media, which resulted in a debut of No. 37 on that publication's listing. The following week, "Countdown" was played by 37 reporting European radio stations in that format and also reached its peak position of No. 36 on the European Hit Radio Top 40 chart.

"Countdown" did not chart on the US Billboard Hot 100, although it did chart on the Cash Box Top 100, peaking at number 84. The song was the second most added song to adult contemporary radio stations reporting to Radio & Records for the week dated August 21, 1992. In Boston, the song was amongst the twenty most played songs on album-oriented rock stations in September 1992. "Countdown" ultimately reached the top 40 on Billboard's Adult Contemporary and Mainstream Rock charts.

For contemporary hit radio, "Countdown" primarily received airplay on radio stations that were classified by Radio & Records as Parallel 3 reporters, consisting of radio stations serving metropolitan areas with a population of less than 200,000 people. During the week of September 25, 1992, Radio & Records listed the song at No. 38 on its airplay ranking for contemporary hit radio stations in the Parallel 3 market. That same week, 34 percent of all contemporary radio stations reporting to the publication had included the song in their playlists.

In Canada, "Countdown" debuted at No. 94 on the RPM 100 singles chart for the week dated September 12, 1992. The song also crossed over to the country's adult contemporary chart, where it reached No. 20 during the week of October 24, 1992. The following week, "Countdown" peaked at No. 29 on the RPM 100 singles chart.

== Critical reception ==
Alan Jones of Music Week wrote that "Countdown" was "good, but unlikely to [be a] hit". Music & Media was more optimistic about the single's commercial prospects and predicted that it was "ready for the charts". Randy Clark of Cashbox thought that the song demonstrated Buckingham's "powerful influence on [his] former band's pop sound."

Writing for Yorkshire Evening Press, Steve Cowell said that the song was a "powerful AOR track with a lot of acoustic guitars" and also thought that it was "nothing special". Jean Rosenbluth of the Los Angeles Times wrote that it was "hard not to be swayed by the singer’s practically palpable optimism" on "Countdown". Reviewing the song for the Gavin Report, Dave Sholin wrote that the song "displays [Buckingham's] skill at crafting commercial pop music that is anything but ordinary."

Mike DeGagne of AllMusic commented that "Countdown" possesses the "pop-catchy appeal of past hits like "Trouble" and "Go Insane" at one level, yet it maintains an enriched, dynamic feel, as if Buckingham has progressed and bettered himself as a solo artist. "Countdown" is an excellent delegate to the kind of music Buckingham is capable of, and it contains a lot of the same constituents that made him such an integral part of the second wave of Fleetwood Mac."

== Track listing ==
- Mercury CD 371 / Mercury 7" 371
1. "Countdown" – 3:48
2. "This Nearly Was Mine" – 1:38
3. "Surrender the Rain" – 3:39
4. "Trouble" – 3:53

== Personnel ==
- Lindsey Buckingham – guitars, bass, keyboards, drums and percussion programming, vocals

== Charts ==
=== Weekly charts ===
Chart (1992)	Peak position
Australia (ARIA)	131
Canada Top Singles (RPM)	29
Canada Adult Contemporary (RPM)	20
European Hit Radio (Music & Media)	36
European Adult Contemporary (Music & Media)	3
Germany (GfK)	66
Italy Airplay (Music & Media)	11
Netherlands (Single Top 100)	64
Sweden (Sverigetopplistan)	28
UK Airplay (Music Week)	40
US Adult Contemporary (Billboard)	32
US Mainstream Rock (Billboard)	38
US Cash Box Top 100	84
US Adult Contemporary (Radio & Records)	24
US AOR Tracks (Radio & Records)	36

=== Year-end charts ===
Chart (1992)	Peak position
European Adult Contemporary (Music & Media)	6
