= Holiday Road =

1983 single by Lindsey Buckingham

- European picture sleeve

Single by Lindsey Buckingham

from the album National Lampoon's Vacation Original Motion Picture Sound Track
- B-side: "The Trip (Theme from Vacation)"
- Released: June 24, 1983
- Recorded: 1982
- Genre: Rock and roll; boogie-woogie; pop rock
- Length: 2:11
- Label: Warner Bros.
- Songwriter: Lindsey Buckingham
- Producers: Lindsey Buckingham; Richard Dashut

Lindsey Buckingham singles chronology
"It Was I" (1981)	"Holiday Road" (1983)	"Go Insane" (1984)

Music video
- "Holiday Road" on YouTube

"Holiday Road" is a 1983 single composed and recorded by American guitarist/singer Lindsey Buckingham. Written for the 1983 film National Lampoon's Vacation, it was also used in the film's sequels National Lampoon's European Vacation (1985), Vegas Vacation (1997) and Vacation (2015). Despite only peaking at number 82 on the Billboard Hot 100 chart during its original release, it has since become one of Buckingham's best known songs.

Buckingham released a live version of the song on his 2008 album Live at the Bass Performance Hall.

In July 2015, a remastered edition of "Holiday Road" was re-released, both on the Vacation soundtrack album and as a digital download along with "Dancin' Across the USA" from the original National Lampoon's Vacation soundtrack.

== Background ==
Following the release of Fleetwood Mac's 1982 album Mirage, Buckingham was approached by Harold Ramis to create two songs for Ramis's film National Lampoon's Vacation. Buckingham was initially reluctant and believed that soundtrack work "wasn't part of his discipline", but he ultimately decided to honor Ramis's request.

Prior to "Holiday Road", Buckingham had never been asked to compose a song for a soundtrack. He recorded the song after seeing a rough cut of the film. Buckingham inferred that the song "had to be somewhat uplifting and a little bit funny". As such, he added dog barks near the end of the song to account for this sense of humor, but was unaware that the movie would feature a scene where a dog gets accidentally dragged to death from the bumper of a car.

Upon hearing "Holiday Road", Ramis and producer Matty Simmons were surprised with how accurately the song addressed the movie's subject matter. During the same recording sessions as "Holiday Road", Buckingham also wrote "Dancin' Across the USA", a Mills Brothers pastiche intended for the movie's ending credits.

"Holiday Road" was first released via a promotional twelve-inch single in July 1983. For the week dated July 23, 1983, "Holiday Road" entered at No. 7 on the US Billboard Bubbling Under Hot 100, a chart that serves as an extension of the Billboard Hot 100. The song debuted at number 92 on the Billboard Hot 100 for the week dated August 6, 1983. During its fourth week on the Hot 100, "Holiday Road" reached its peak of number 82 and then slipped to number 99 on its fifth and final week on the chart.

When asked in a 2017 interview about his thoughts on "Holiday Road", Buckingham replied that "It was one of those things that happened to work very well for the movie". Buckingham elaborated in a later interview that he enjoyed recording "Holiday Road" and remembered that Ramis was "thrilled" when he first heard the song in the studio.

== Charts ==
Chart performance for "Holiday Road" by Lindsey Buckingham
Chart (1983)	Peak position
US Billboard Hot 100	82

== Kesha version ==
"Holiday Road"

Promotional single by Kesha
- B-side: "A Very Merry Christmas from Kesha"
- Released: October 15, 2024
- Genre: Dance-pop; electro rock; holiday; synth-pop
- Length: 2:05
- Label: Kesha
- Songwriter: Lindsey Buckingham
- Producers: Zhone; Kesha

Vinyl cover

Audio video
- "Holiday Road" on YouTube

On October 15, 2024, American singer and songwriter Kesha released an exclusive cover version of "Holiday Road" for Spotify's Spotify Singles Holiday series, the singer's first holiday release. The song saw great chart success, with the song being her first to enter the Billboard Hot 100 since 2018's "Woman". The song also peaked at number 38 on the UK Singles Chart and number 61 on the Canadian Hot 100. The song was made available on all streaming services on November 12, 2025.

An exclusive 7" vinyl was released on November 28, 2025, as part of Record Store Day, featuring the song physically for the first time ever. The B-side of the vinyl is "A Very Merry Christmas from Kesha", a cover version of "Have Yourself a Merry Little Christmas" originally released on Kesha's YouTube channel in 2010.

=== Chart performance ===
Chart performance for "Holiday Road" by Kesha
Chart (2024–2025)	Peak position
Australia (ARIA)	54
Canada Hot 100 (Billboard)	61
Global 200 (Billboard)	130
Ireland (IRMA)	24
Lithuania (AGATA)	60
New Zealand Hot 40 Singles (RMNZ)	2
UK Singles (Official Charts)	38
UK Independent (Official Charts)	6
US Billboard Hot 100	88
US Holiday 100 (Billboard)	98
US Hot Dance/Electronic Songs (Billboard)	2

== Cover versions and usage ==
The song has been covered by pop-punk bands Limp, the Aquabats, Whippersnapper, Matt Pond PA, and Dirt Bike Annie. The song was also covered by gothic country band Murder by Death in their holiday album Lonesome Holiday. The indie rock band the Walkmen performed a version of the song in November 2010 for The A.V. Club's Holiday Undercover web series. In 2015, the country group Zac Brown Band covered the song for the soundtrack of the film Vacation. In 2024, indie music supergroup Fantastic Cat and American pop singer Kesha both released covers of the song. Kesha's electro-rock version peaked at number 88 on the Billboard Hot 100, as well as number 38 on the UK Singles Chart and number 61 on the Canadian Hot 100.

In 2011, the song was used as the music on television advertising for Teletext Holidays, a British travel agency. In 2013, "Holiday Road" was adopted as the unofficial playoff victory song of the 2013 Chicago Blackhawks, who went on to win the Stanley Cup on June 24, the 30th anniversary of the song's release.

The song appears under the closing credits of National Lampoon: Drunk Stoned Brilliant Dead, a 2015 American documentary film directed by Douglas Tirola about the magazine and its related franchises and influence. A version of the song with rewritten lyrics was used in Honda television commercials in 2017. In 2023, the song appeared in the fourth episode of the second season of the FX television series The Bear.

Country music singer Chris Janson performed "Holiday Road" on the Grand Ole Opry's "Opry Country Christmas" broadcast on December 11, 2022. He later recorded and released it as a single in 2023.

In 2024, the song was used in a holiday-themed Coca-Cola television advertisement.
