= National Lampoon's Vacation =

1983 film by Harold Ramis

- Theatrical release poster by Boris Vallejo
- Directed by: Harold Ramis
- Screenplay by: John Hughes
- Based on: "Vacation '58" by John Hughes
- Produced by: Matty Simmons
- Starring: Chevy Chase; Beverly D'Angelo; Imogene Coca; Randy Quaid; John Candy; Christie Brinkley
- Cinematography: Victor J. Kemper
- Edited by: Pembroke J. Herring
- Music by: Ralph Burns
- Distributed by: Warner Bros.
- Release date: July 29, 1983
- Running time: 98 minutes
- Country: United States
- Language: English
- Budget: $15 million
- Box office: $61.4 million

National Lampoon's Vacation, sometimes referred to as simply Vacation, is a 1983 American comedy road film directed by Harold Ramis and starring Chevy Chase, Beverly D'Angelo, Imogene Coca, Randy Quaid, John Candy, and Christie Brinkley in her acting debut with special appearances by Eddie Bracken, Brian Doyle-Murray, Miriam Flynn, James Keach, Eugene Levy, and Frank McRae. It tells the story of the Griswold family on a cross-country trip to an amusement park and various locations as accidents and mishaps occur along the way. The screenplay was written by John Hughes on the basis of his short story "Vacation '58", which appeared in National Lampoon.

National Lampoon's Vacation was released by Warner Bros. on July 29, 1983. The film was a box-office hit, earning more than $60 million in the U.S. alone with an estimated budget of $15 million.

As a result of its success, five sequels have been produced: National Lampoon's European Vacation (1985), National Lampoon's Christmas Vacation (1989), Vegas Vacation (1997), National Lampoon's Christmas Vacation 2 (2003), and Vacation (2015). In 2000, readers of Total Film voted it the 46th greatest comedy film of all time.

== Plot ==
Clark Griswold, wanting to spend more time with his wife Ellen and children Rusty and Audrey, decides to lead the family on a cross-country expedition from the Chicago suburbs to the southern California amusement park Walley World, billed as "America's Favorite Family Fun Park". Ellen wants to fly, but Clark insists on driving so he can bond with his family. He has ordered a new car in preparation for the trip, but the shady dealer claims it will not be ready for six weeks. Clark is forced to buy the "Wagon Queen Family Truckster", an ugly, oversized station wagon after the car he traded in has been crushed.

During the family's travels, they experience numerous mishaps, such as being tagged by vandals after taking a wrong turn in St. Louis, Missouri. Clark aggravates a bartender in Dodge City, Kansas, and is tantalized on numerous occasions by a beautiful young woman driving a Ferrari 308 GTS.

The Griswolds stop in Coolidge, Kansas, to visit Ellen's cousin Catherine, her lazy, unemployed husband Eddie, who foist cranky Aunt Edna and her mean dog Dinky on the Griswolds, asking them to drop her off at her son Norman's home in Phoenix. After stopping at a decrepit and dirty campground in South Fork, Colorado, for the night, Clark forgets to untie Dinky's leash from the rear bumper before driving off the following day, killing the dog. A motorcycle cop pulls the Griswolds over and angrily lectures Clark over cruelty to animals, but accepts Clark's apology. Edna learns of this and becomes irate with Clark for killing her dog. Leaving Colorado, Ellen loses her bag with her credit cards, and Clark reports them as lost.

While Ellen and Clark argue during a drive between Utah and Arizona, they crash and become stranded in the desert near Monument Valley. Clark sets off into the desert to look for help, but becomes lost. He reunites with his family, who have been rescued and taken to a local mechanic. The mechanic, who is also the town sheriff, extorts Clark's remaining cash, only to render the car barely operational. Frustrated, the family stops at the El Tovar Hotel overlooking the Grand Canyon. When Clark cannot convince the hotel's concierge to cash a personal check because his own credit cards have mistakenly been reported lost, he raids the cash register behind the concierge's back and leaves the check. Continuing their drive, the Griswolds find that Aunt Edna has died in her sleep. They tie her body to the roof of the car, wrapped in a tarpaulin. Discovering that Norman is out of town when they arrive at his home, they attach a note to the body and leave it in the back yard with an umbrella.

Overwhelmed by the mishaps they have encountered, Ellen and the children want to go home, but Clark has become obsessed with reaching Walley World. After an argument with Ellen, Clark meets the Ferrari-driving blonde at the motel bar, and swims naked with her in the motel pool. Clark's screams of the cold temperature alert the family and the other guests of the motel, they are embarrassed by the situation. Ellen forgives Clark, and they go swimming naked as well.

When the Griswolds finally arrive at Walley World, they discover the park closed for repairs for the next two weeks. Slipping into madness over his efforts being for nothing, Clark buys a realistic looking BB gun and demands that park security guard Russ Lasky take them through Walley World. An LAPD SWAT team soon arrives, but as the family is about to be arrested, park owner Roy Walley shows up to de-escalate the situation. Roy understands Clark's longing to achieve the perfect vacation, bringing back memories of his family vacation troubles. He decides not to file criminal charges against the Griswolds and lets the family and the SWAT team enjoy the park as his guests.

The credits show a montage of snapshots taken during the trip, ending with one showing the Griswolds flying back to Chicago.

== Cast ==
- Chevy Chase as Clark W. Griswold, the Griswold family patriarch
- Beverly D'Angelo as Ellen Griswold, the Griswold family matriarch
- Anthony Michael Hall as Russell "Rusty" Griswold, Clark & Ellen's son
- Dana Barron as Audrey Griswold, Clark & Ellen's daughter
- Imogene Coca as Aunt Edna, Ellen's maternal aunt
- Randy Quaid as Eddie Johnson
- John Candy as Russ Lasky, a security guard at Walley World
- Christie Brinkley as the unnamed woman in the red Ferrari
- Eugene Levy as Ed, the car salesman
- Miriam Flynn as Catherine Johnson, Ellen's maternal cousin and Eddie's wife
- James Keach as the motorcycle cop
- Brian Doyle-Murray as the Kamp Komfort clerk
- Frank McRae as Grover, a security guard at Walley World
- Eddie Bracken as Roy Walley, the owner of Walley World
- Jane Krakowski as Vicki Johnson, Eddie & Catherine's daughter
- John P. Navin Jr. as Dale Johnson, Eddie & Catherine's son
- Violet Ramis (daughter of Harold Ramis) as Daisy Mabel Johnson, Eddie & Catherine's daughter, who was born without a tongue
- Mickey Jones as the mechanic sheriff
- John Diehl as the mechanic sheriff's assistant
- Harold Ramis has offscreen voice cameos as a recorded message from park mascot Marty the Moose and as an offscreen police officer asking Mr. Walley if they should take the Griswold family downtown and book them.

== Production ==
During the Chicago blizzard of 1979, writer John Hughes began developing a short story titled "Vacation '58" for an issue of the National Lampoon. While the story ended up being bumped from the initial vacation-themed issue, it was eventually published in September 1979 and subsequently optioned by Warner Bros. Pictures. "When I brought it to Hollywood, the first guy I brought it to was Jeff Katzenberg who was at Paramount," recalled producer Matty Simmons, who worked as a publisher at the National Lampoon. "He said it would never make a movie, it was too episodic, too consequential. I said, 'Yeah, it's a road trip. It's supposed to be episodic. You go from town to town, place to place.' But he didn't like it, so then my agent brought it to Warner Brothers, and I met with them. Most of them said the same thing, but there was one executive over there—a guy named Mark Canton—who really pulled for it and it got made."

Upon Simmons's agreement with Warner Bros., Hughes was tasked with adapting his original story into a screenplay. Harold Ramis and Chevy Chase rewrote Hughes's first draft to place the story from the father's point of view rather than the son's.

=== Filming ===
Filming began on July 5, 1982, in Boone, Colorado, and lasted 55 days. Parts of the film were shot in Monument Valley, Utah; Flagstaff, Sedona, and the Grand Canyon in Arizona; Santa Anita Racetrack in Arcadia and Magic Mountain in California; Southern Colorado, and St. Louis, Missouri.

The original ending of the film, which involved the Griswolds taking Roy Walley hostage, was judged poorly by test audiences. A new ending featuring John Candy was filmed in its place; in this revised ending, shot several months after the rest of the film, Anthony Michael Hall has become noticeably taller. The original ending is discussed in the film's commentary track, but has not been issued in any format since the test screenings.

=== Walley World ===
In Hughes's original short story, the theme park was Disneyland. To avoid legal troubles, all of the names associated with Disneyland were altered to sound-alikes. For instance, the park became Walley World, itself a good-natured parody of the Anaheim location, and the mascot, Marty Moose, is reminiscent of Walt Disney's own Mickey Mouse. Similarly, Roy Walley's name and appearance may be a reference to Disney's brother Roy O. Disney.

In the film, the Walley World theme park is represented by Santa Anita Park in Arcadia, California, and Six Flags Magic Mountain in Valencia, California. Santa Anita Park's large parking lot and blue-tinged fascia served as the exterior of Walley World, while all park interior scenes were shot at Magic Mountain. The two roller coasters seen in the film are the steel coaster La Revolución, (now known as The New Revolution) which can be recognized by the vertical loop, and the wooden coaster Colossus (which is now the Hybrid coaster Twisted Colossus), the double-track wooden roller coaster.

The movie's popularity gave rise to an ongoing cultural habit of using the name "Wally World" (spelled without an "e") as a nickname for real-life retailer Walmart.

=== Wagon Queen Family Truckster ===
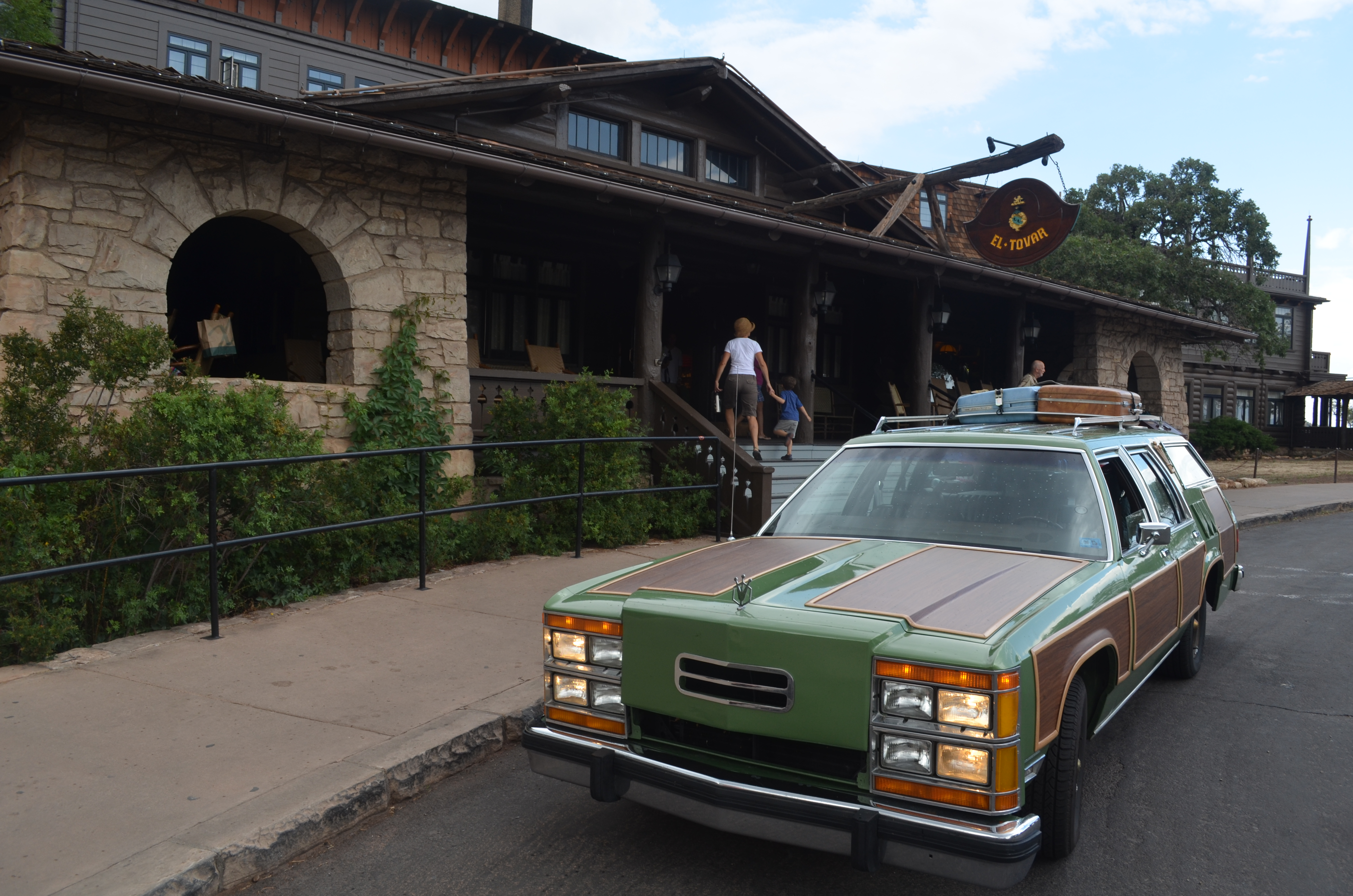
Wagon Queen Family Truckster

The Wagon Queen Family Truckster station wagon was created specifically for the film. It is based on a 1979 Ford LTD Country Squire station wagon. The car was designed by Warner Bros. The Truckster features a "metallic pea" green paint scheme, extensive imitation wood-paneling decals, eight headlights (the second pair was taken from another Crown Victoria/Country Squire and mounted upside-down above the stock pair), a grille area largely covered by bodywork with only two small openings close to the bumper, an oddly placed fuel filler door and an airbag made from a trashcan liner.

== Music ==
The musical score for National Lampoon's Vacation was composed by Ralph Burns, featuring original songs by Lindsey Buckingham. A soundtrack album was released in 1983 by Warner Bros. Records. While the album did not chart, Buckingham's single "Holiday Road" reached number 82 on the Billboard Hot 100.

1. "Holiday Road" – Lindsey Buckingham
2. "Mr. Blue" – The Fleetwoods
3. "Blitzkrieg Bop" – Ramones
4. "Deep River Blues" – Ralph Burns
5. "Summer Hearts" – Nicolette Larson
6. "Little Boy Sweet" – June Pointer
7. "The Trip (Theme from Vacation)" – Ralph Burns
8. "He's So Dull" – Vanity 6
9. "Christie's Song" – Ralph Burns
10. "Dancin' Across the USA" – Lindsey Buckingham

== Release ==
=== Home media ===
National Lampoon's Vacation was first released on VHS, Betamax, Laserdisc, and CED in late 1983. It was released again on VHS in 1986, 1991, 1995 and 1999. It was first released on DVD in 1997. The DVD was presented in an open-matte full-screen presentation. Its only feature was the film's theatrical trailer. A 20th anniversary DVD was released in 2003. It included an anamorphic widescreen transfer. Its bonus features included an audio commentary with director Harold Ramis, producer Matty Simmons, and stars Chevy Chase, Anthony Michael Hall, Dana Barron, and Randy Quaid. It also included an introduction with Chase, Simmons, and Quaid, a family truckster interactive featurette gallery, and the film's theatrical trailer. A Blu-ray was released in 2013. It included the same features from the 20th Anniversary DVD and included the A&E documentary Inside Story: National Lampoon's Vacation. The film was later released in 4K by Warner Bros. in 2023.

== Reception ==
=== Box office ===
National Lampoon's Vacation opened theatrically in 1,175 venues on July 29, 1983, and earned $8,333,358 in its opening weekend, ranking number one at the domestic box office. The film grossed $61,399,552.

=== Critical response ===
In 1983, Janet Maslin of The New York Times gave the film a positive review, saying, "National Lampoon's Vacation, which is more controlled than other Lampoon movies have been, is careful not to stray too far from its target. The result is a confident humor and throwaway style that helps sustain the laughs – of which there are quite a few." Entertainment magazine Variety called the film "an enjoyable trip through familiar comedy landscapes" and praised "director Harold Ramis for populating the film with a host of well-known comedic performers in passing parts." The Chicago Tribune was less impressed in 1983: "There are two, maybe three, good gags [in the film] which is otherwise poorly paced, sloppily put together and full of inept, ill-conceived performances....when you take a look at the gags that work here and ask why they're funny and why the rest of the film isn't, the limpness of 'Lampoon's Vacation' isn't so surprising after all....Judging by their work, the people who made 'Lampoon's Vacation' are just as smug and selfish as the characters they're attempting to satirize. Perhaps Chase, Ramis, and the rest of that crowd have begun to realize they no longer have much ground to stand on, because the pose of mock-rebellion that enlivened 'Animal House' and gave some zest to 'Stripes' seems very hollow now. And when a comedy of this sort doesn't have some sense of attitude behind it, it doesn't have anything else."

In 2006, Richard Rayner of Time Out magazine wrote, "The visual gags come thick and fast, and are about as subtly signposted as the exit markers on a freeway. An exercise in the comedy of humiliation which is the stuff of shamefaced giggles."

On review aggregator website Rotten Tomatoes, the film holds a score of 94% based on 48 reviews, with an average rating of 7.4/10. The site's consensus reads, "Blessed by a brilliantly befuddled star turn from Chevy Chase, National Lampoon's Vacation is one of the more consistent – and thoroughly quotable – screwball comedies of the 1980s." On Metacritic it has a 55 out of 100 rating based on 13 critics, indicating "mixed or average reviews". Audiences polled by CinemaScore gave the film an average grade of "C+" on an A+ to F scale; the company's founder, Ed Mintz, said in 2016, "I loved it ... I couldn't figure out for anything why people didn't love that more".

== Sequel ==
A sequel titled National Lampoon's European Vacation, was released in 1985.
