= Soul Drifter =

Single by Lindsey Buckingham

from the album Out of the Cradle
- B-side: "Say We’ll Meet Again"
- Released: 1992
- Genre: Soft rock
- Length: 3:27
- Label: Reprise (North America), Mercury (Europe)
- Songwriter: Lindsey Buckingham
- Producers: Lindsey Buckingham, Richard Dashut

Lindsey Buckingham singles chronology
"Countdown" (1992)	"Soul Drifter" (1992)	"Don't Look Down" (1993)

"Soul Drifter" is a song by Lindsey Buckingham, released in 1992 from his third solo album Out of the Cradle. It was released as a single in both Europe and North America, reaching number 53 in Germany and number 31 in Canada. During Buckingham's Out of the Cradle Tour, "Soul Drifter" was included as the final song of the set. Buckingham later performed the song in support of his self-titled album in 2021.

== Background ==
In a 1997 interview with Paul Zollo, Buckingham said that the lyrics to "Soul Drifter" came to him "in a flash." He finished the lyrics before he committed the song to tape, which contrasted with his usual approach of starting with the instrumentation first. Buckingham wrote the song while Fleetwood Mac was at his house mixing Tango in the Night. He commented that the song was about "taking off and leaving it up to fate as to what will happen." He later discussed the song in a Q&A with Vulture when asked about the most romantic song in his discography.

It's very much an Americana kind of feel song, very much a pop song. That makes it romantic in terms of style and form, but it also addresses the world in quite a romantic way — someone who wants to come in and help contribute, yet realizes that everything is transient, so is willing to look at life that way and move on when it’s time to move on and see the beauty in all of that.

During the development "Soul Drifter", Buckingham was influenced by the music that his parents listened to growing up, which he captured by emulating the conventions of Tin Pan Alley music. "I do think there's a lot to be looked at in that type of music. I tried to get that traditional, Tin Pan Alley sort of approach when I was writing 'Soul Drifter'. So I think there's a lot of validity, just looking at that stuff and appreciating it. Especially if it's part of your background." According to Buckingham, "Soul Drifter" was his mother's favorite song on the album.

Several of the guitars were treated with a vari-speed oscillator (VSO), particularly during the intro, which features two guitars playing an ascending line in octaves and another guitar playing a figure in triple meter. During the pressing of Out of the Cradle, Lee Herschberg, who had worked with Frank Sinatra, was making some copies of the album when he first heard "Soul Drifter". Upon hearing it, Herschberg reportedly quipped "Oh, a real song!"

A radio edit of the song was serviced to radio stations as a promo single by Reprise Records. This mix was later included on the 20th Century Lindsey box set. Radio & Records reported that "Soul Drifter" was added to 14 reporting adult contemporary radio stations in the United States for the week of October 30, 1992, making it one of the most added songs in that format. That same week, Reprise Records included an advertisement in Radio & Records promoting "Soul Drifter" as "the single that radio asked for". On the week dated November 27, 1992, "Soul Drifter" debuted on the publication's AC National Airplay listing at number 30 with a total of 38 reporting adult contemporary radio stations playing the song. The following month, the single began to receive airplay on contemporary hit radio stations.

== Critical reception ==
Timothy White of Billboard said that the "contrasting layers of Lindsey's multitracked vocals are interwoven with various metronomic riff-sounds that constantly supplant each other before their essential sameness can be detected." Cashbox believed that "Soul Drifter" was "yet one more example of Lindsey's musical influence on the overall sound of the '70s Mac-Attack, and should at least deserve attention on Adult Contemporary stations."

BAM highlighted the song's commercial appeal, saying that it "wouldn't sound out of place on any radio format". The New York Times characterized "Soul Drifter" as "a gorgeous folk-cowboy song" that "ends with quotes from The Tokens' "Lion Sleeps Tonight." Writing for The Age, Richard Plunkett likened "Soul Drifter" to "the Eagles and ELO in a supermarket jingle soundtrack" and called it a "lush pop song".

== Personnel ==
- Lindsey Buckingham – all instruments and vocals

== Charts ==
Chart (1992–1993)	Peak position
Canada Top Singles (RPM)	31
Canada Adult Contemporary Singles (RPM)	15
Germany (GfK)	53
US Adult Contemporary (Billboard)	38
US Adult Contemporary (Radio & Records)	23
