= Lindsey Buckingham =

American musician (born 1949)

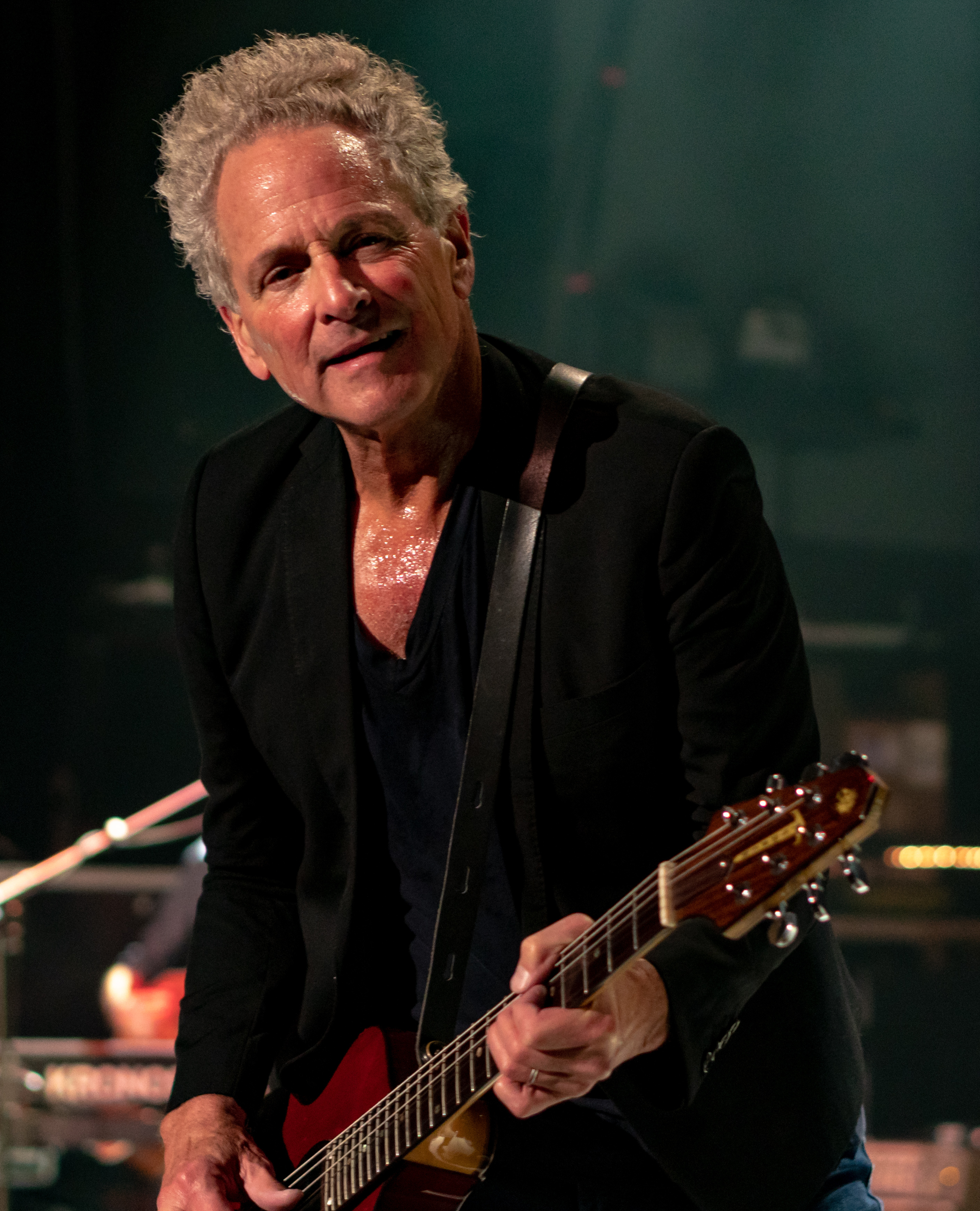
- Buckingham performing in 2018

Background information
- Born: Lindsey Adams Buckingham; October 3, 1949 (age 77); Palo Alto, California, U.S.
- Genre: Rock
- Occupations: Musician; singer; songwriter; record producer
- Instruments: Guitar; vocals
- Years active: 1966–present
- Labels: Reprise; Polydor; Mercury; Elektra; Asylum; Columbia; Buckingham
- Formerly of: Buckingham McVie; Fleetwood Mac; Buckingham Nicks
- Spouse: Kristen Messner (m. 2000)
- Partner: Stevie Nicks (1972–1976)
- Website: lindseybuckingham.com

Lindsey Adams Buckingham (born October 3, 1949) is an American musician, record producer, and the lead guitarist and co-lead vocalist of the rock band Fleetwood Mac from 1975 to 1987 and 1997 to 2018. In addition to his tenure with Fleetwood Mac, Buckingham has released seven solo studio albums and three live albums. As a member of Fleetwood Mac, he was inducted into the Rock and Roll Hall of Fame in 1998. Buckingham was ranked 100th in Rolling Stone's 2011 list of "The 100 Greatest Guitarists of All Time". Buckingham is known for his fingerpicking guitar style.

Buckingham joined Fleetwood Mac in 1975, replacing guitarist Bob Welch, and convinced the group to recruit his musical (and, at the time, romantic) partner Stevie Nicks as well. Buckingham and Nicks became prominent members of Fleetwood Mac during its most commercially successful period, highlighted by the multi-platinum studio album Rumours (1977), which sold over 40 million copies worldwide. Though highly successful, the group experienced almost constant creative and personal conflict, and Buckingham left the band in 1987 to focus on his solo career. Hit songs Buckingham wrote and sang with Fleetwood Mac include "Go Your Own Way", "Never Going Back Again", "Tusk", and "Big Love".

A one-off reunion at the 1993 inauguration ball for President Bill Clinton initiated some rapprochement between the former band members, with Buckingham performing some vocals on one track of their 1995 studio album Time, and rejoining the band full-time in 1997 for the live tour and album The Dance. In 2018, Buckingham was dismissed from Fleetwood Mac and replaced by Mike Campbell and Neil Finn.

== Early life ==
Lindsey Adams Buckingham was born on October 3, 1949, in Palo Alto, California, to Morris H. Buckingham and Rutheda, née Elliott. Morris H. Buckingham, who was a football star at San Jose State College, by 1963 served as President of Alexander-Ballert Company of San Francisco, a producer of roasted coffee beans, and ran a coffee plant in Daly City, California near Palo Alto. California's popular Alta Organic Coffee remains one of their brands. Buckingham had two older brothers, Jeffrey and Gregory. Growing up in the San Francisco Bay Area community of Atherton, he attended Menlo-Atherton High School where Buckingham and his brothers were encouraged to swim competitively. Though Buckingham dropped out of athletics to pursue music, his brother Gregory went on to win a silver medal at the 1968 Olympics in Mexico City. Though he did not graduate, Lindsey attended San José State University, like his brother Greg and father Morris.

Buckingham's first forays into guitar playing took place on a toy Mickey Mouse guitar, playing along to his brother Jeff's extensive collection of 45s. Noticing his talent, Buckingham's parents bought their son a $35 Harmony guitar. Buckingham later purchased a 4-track Ampex recorder using some of the $12,000 inheritance he received from one of his aunts.

Buckingham never took guitar lessons and does not read music. By age 13, he became interested in folk music and practiced playing the guitar and banjo parts to music by John Herald, Ian & Sylvia, and The Kingston Trio.

== Music career ==
From 1966 to 1971, Buckingham performed psychedelic and folk rock with the high school rock band originally named the Fritz Rabyne Memorial Band as a bassist and vocalist. The band regrouped in 1967 due to band member changes and shortened their name to Fritz. Buckingham invited friend Stevie Nicks to join Fritz as a backing vocalist. Their romantic relationship began after both left Fritz five years later.

=== 1973–1974: Buckingham Nicks ===
Buckingham and his then-girlfriend Nicks recorded seven demos in 1972 on a half-inch 4-track Ampex recorder kept at his father's coffee-roasting plant in Daly City, then drove to Los Angeles to pursue a recording contract. In 1973, Polydor Records signed the pair. Their studio album, produced by Keith Olsen and second engineer Richard Dashut, Buckingham Nicks, was released in September 1973; however, soon after its release Polydor dropped the duo because of poor sales. To help make ends meet, Buckingham toured with Don Everly's backing band, singing Phil Everly's parts.

=== 1975–1980: Fleetwood Mac and mainstream success ===
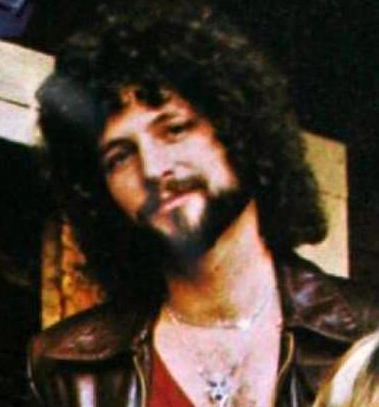
Buckingham in 1977

While investigating Sound City recording studio in California, Mick Fleetwood heard the song "Frozen Love" from the Buckingham Nicks studio album. Impressed, he asked who the guitarist was. By chance, Buckingham and Nicks were also in Sound City recording demos, and Buckingham and Fleetwood were introduced. When Bob Welch left Fleetwood Mac in December 1974, Fleetwood immediately contacted Buckingham and offered him the vacant guitar slot in his band. Buckingham told Fleetwood that he and Nicks were a team and that he didn't want to work without her. Fleetwood agreed to hire both of them, without an audition. Buckingham and Nicks then began a short tour to promote the Buckingham Nicks album. The touring band included drummers Bob Aguirre and Gary Hodges (playing simultaneously) and bassist Tom Moncrieff, who later played bass on Nicks' debut solo studio album Bella Donna (1981). When they played in Alabama, the one area where they saw appreciable sales, they told their fans they had joined Fleetwood Mac.

Fleetwood Mac released their eponymously titled studio album in 1975, which reached number one on the American charts. Buckingham contributed two songs to the album, "Monday Morning" and "I'm So Afraid", while also singing lead on "Blue Letter" and Nicks' song "Crystal". "I'm So Afraid" and "Monday Morning" were intended for the planned follow-up Buckingham Nicks studio album, but they were instead used with Fleetwood Mac.

Buckingham's second studio album with Fleetwood Mac, Rumours (1977), became one of the best-selling studio albums of all time and featured Buckingham's "Go Your Own Way" as the lead single, which reached number ten on the Billboard Hot 100; also on the album were Buckingham's "Second Hand News" and "Never Going Back Again". Buckingham also sang co-lead vocal on two of the band's biggest live staples: "The Chain", written by the entire band, and "Don't Stop", a Christine McVie number.

After the commercial success of Rumours (during the making of which Buckingham and Nicks broke up), Buckingham was determined to avoid falling into repeating the same musical pattern. Buckingham convinced Fleetwood to let his work on their next studio album be more experimental and to be allowed to work on tracks at home before bringing them to the rest of the band in the studio. The result was Tusk (1979), a double studio album that Buckingham primarily directed. Once again, Buckingham wrote the lead single, the title track, which peaked at No. 8 in the US and No. 6 on the UK singles chart. It also featured the 112-member USC Trojan Marching Band, who recorded their parts at Dodger Stadium.

=== 1981: Going solo and Law and Order ===
During the time he worked on Tusk, Buckingham also produced studio albums for Walter Egan and John Stewart in the late 1970s as well as beginning work on his own solo studio album.

In 1981, Buckingham released his debut solo studio album, Law and Order, playing nearly every instrument and featuring guest appearances by bandmates Mick Fleetwood and Christine McVie. The album pursued the quirky, eclectic, often lo-fi and new wave influences of Tusk and spawned the single "Trouble" (inspired by Fleetwood Mac producer Richard Dashut), which reached No. 9 on the Billboard Hot 100 and No. 1 in Australia (for three weeks).

=== 1982: Mirage ===
After a large world tour that ended in 1980, Fleetwood Mac took a year-long break before reconvening to record their next studio album Mirage (1982), a more pop-friendly work that returned the band to the top of the US album chart. However, by this time various members of the band were enjoying success as solo artists (particularly Nicks) and the next Fleetwood Mac album was not released until five years later.

=== 1983–1986: Go Insane and other solo projects ===
In 1983, he wrote and performed the songs "Holiday Road" and "Dancin' Across the USA" for the film National Lampoon's Vacation. "Holiday Road" was released as a single and reached No. 82 on Billboard's Hot 100.

In 1984, after ending his 7-year relationship with Carol Ann Harris, he released his second solo studio album, Go Insane. The title track was a modest hit, reaching No. 23 on the Hot 100. In 2008, he revealed the title track was about his post-breakup relationship with Stevie Nicks; however, Harris claimed in her memoir Storms that the song was written about her breakup with Buckingham. The last track of the album, "D.W. Suite", was a tribute to the late Beach Boys drummer Dennis Wilson, a close friend of Fleetwood Mac who was in a romantic relationship with Christine McVie. Also that year, Buckingham played guitars and sang harmony vocals on the track "You Can't Make Love" from Don Henley's second solo studio album Building the Perfect Beast.

The next year, Buckingham performed on USA for Africa's fundraising single, "We Are the World". In 1986, he co-wrote "Since You've Gone" for Belinda Carlisle's debut solo studio album, Belinda. He did other soundtrack work, including the song "Time Bomb Town" from Back to the Future (1985). Buckingham played all of the instruments on the track except drums, which were played by Michael Huey.

=== 1987: Tango In the Night and departure from Fleetwood Mac ===
Buckingham's fifth studio album with Fleetwood Mac, Tango in the Night, was released in 1987. Buckingham had already released two solo studio albums and had given up much of the material for what would have been his third solo studio album for the project, including "Big Love", "Tango in the Night ", "Family Man", "You and I" and "Caroline". "Big Love", released as the first single from the album, became a top ten hit in the US and the UK.

Propelled by a string of hit singles, Tango in the Night became the band's biggest studio album since Rumours a decade earlier. However, following its release, Buckingham left Fleetwood Mac largely because of his desire not to tour and the strain he was feeling within the band. "I needed to get some separation from Stevie especially because I don't think I'd ever quite gotten closure on our relationship," he said. "I needed to get on with the next phase of my creative growth and my emotional growth. When you break up with someone and then for the next 10 years you have to be around them and do for them and watch them move away from you, it's not easy." Fleetwood Mac continued without him, and Buckingham was replaced by two guitarists, Rick Vito and Billy Burnette.

=== 1988–1992: Out of the Cradle ===
Following his departure from Fleetwood Mac in 1987, Buckingham spent much of the next five years in the studio, working on his third solo studio album, Out of the Cradle, which was released in 1992. Many of the songs deal with his relationship with Nicks and his decision to leave the band. "There were things lingering for years having to do with relationships and the band, hurtful things, that were impossible to deal with until I left. If you were in a relationship and split up, then had to see that person every day for the next 15 years, it might keep you from dealing with some of those things. While we made Rumours (in 1977) there were two couples breaking up in the band (Buckingham and Nicks, and John and Christine McVie), and we had to say, 'This is an important thing we're doing, so we've got to put this set of feelings on this side of the room and get on with it.' And when you do that long enough you forget that those feelings are even there. On this album, I'm putting all these feelings in the healthiest possible perspective and that, looking at it broadly, is a lot of what the album is dealing with. It's a catharsis, absolutely."

"Wrong" was a gentle rebuke of former bandmate Mick Fleetwood's tell-all biography, published in 1990. Out of the Cradle received some favorable reviews but did not achieve the sales levels associated with Fleetwood Mac. However, Buckingham toured throughout 1992–93 for the first time as a solo artist with four guitarists, a bassist, keyboardist, and three percussionists.

=== 1993–2004: Return to Fleetwood Mac ===
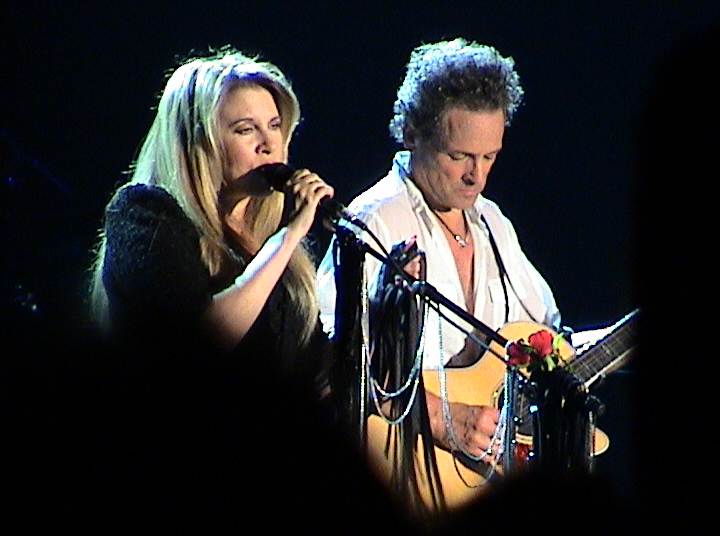
Stevie Nicks and Buckingham on the Say You Will Tour in 2003

In 1993, newly elected president Bill Clinton asked Fleetwood Mac to come together to perform the song he had chosen for his campaign, the Christine McVie-penned "Don't Stop", at his inauguration on January 20, 1993. Buckingham agreed to be part of the performance, but the experience was something of a one-off for the band, who were still very much at odds with one another and had no plans to reunite officially.

While assembling material for a planned fourth solo studio album in the mid-1990s, Buckingham contacted Mick Fleetwood for assistance on a song. Their collaboration lasted much longer than anticipated, and the two eventually decided to call upon Stevie Nicks, John and Christine McVie. In 1997, Buckingham and all four of his bandmates from the Rumours-era line-up of Fleetwood Mac went on the road for the first time together since 1982 in a reunion tour titled The Dance. The tour was hugely successful and did much to heal the damage that had been done between Buckingham and his bandmates. However, Christine McVie left the band in 1998 because of her fear of flying and to be with her family in the UK, thus making Fleetwood Mac a four-piece band.

A subsequent fourth solo studio album, titled Gift of Screws, was recorded between 1995 and 2001 and presented to Warner Bros. and Reprise for release. Executives at the label managed to persuade Buckingham to hold the album back and instead take several tracks from Gift of Screws and use them with Fleetwood Mac. In 2003, the reformed band released the first studio album involving Buckingham and Nicks in 15 years, Say You Will. Buckingham's song "Peacekeeper" was the first single from the album, and the band went on a world concert tour that lasted almost a year and a half. Seven songs from Gift of Screws appear on the Fleetwood Mac studio album Say You Will, in substantially the same form as Buckingham had recorded them for his solo release. Bootleg copies of Gift of Screws—taken from an original CD-R presented to Warner Bros and Reprise—are known to exist and have been widely distributed among fans through the use of torrent sites and other peer-to-peer networks.

=== 2006–2008: Continuing solo ===
On his 57th birthday, October 3, 2006, Buckingham's fourth solo studio album, an acoustic album now titled Under the Skin, was released. Under the Skin features Buckingham on almost all instruments, with the exception of two tracks that feature Fleetwood Mac's rhythm section of John McVie and Mick Fleetwood. The album includes a cover of the Rolling Stones classic "I Am Waiting". Three days after the album's release, Buckingham embarked on a tour in support of the album that lasted until the end of June 2007. A live album and DVD, Live at the Bass Performance Hall, was released documenting the Fort Worth, Texas show from this tour.

In 2008, the Gift of Screws album was finally released, containing three tracks from the originally planned studio album, as well as seven new recordings. Buckingham then commenced a short tour to promote Gift of Screws in September and October, opening in Saratoga, California and closing in New York City.

=== 2009: Unleashed Tour ===
Fleetwood Mac toured in 2009, with the first date of the "UNLEASHED" Tour as March 1, 2009, in Mellon Arena (Pittsburgh). Christine McVie was not involved with this project.

=== 2010–2012: Seeds We Sow and One Man Show ===
On November 3, 2010, Buckingham's website announced that he was working on an untitled studio album with release planned in early 2011. Buckingham had finished recording the studio album, titled Seeds We Sow in April, and on April 22, 2011, he filmed a concert for DVD release to support the album. Seeds We Sow was released on September 6, 2011. On September 10, Buckingham started the Seeds We Sow Tour in Reno, Nevada; the tour ended in Tulsa, Oklahoma, on November 14. Buckingham had planned to conduct his first solo tour of the United Kingdom and Ireland in December. However, in early December, Buckingham postponed all UK dates due to his guitarist suffering a back injury. The UK dates were subsequently cancelled.

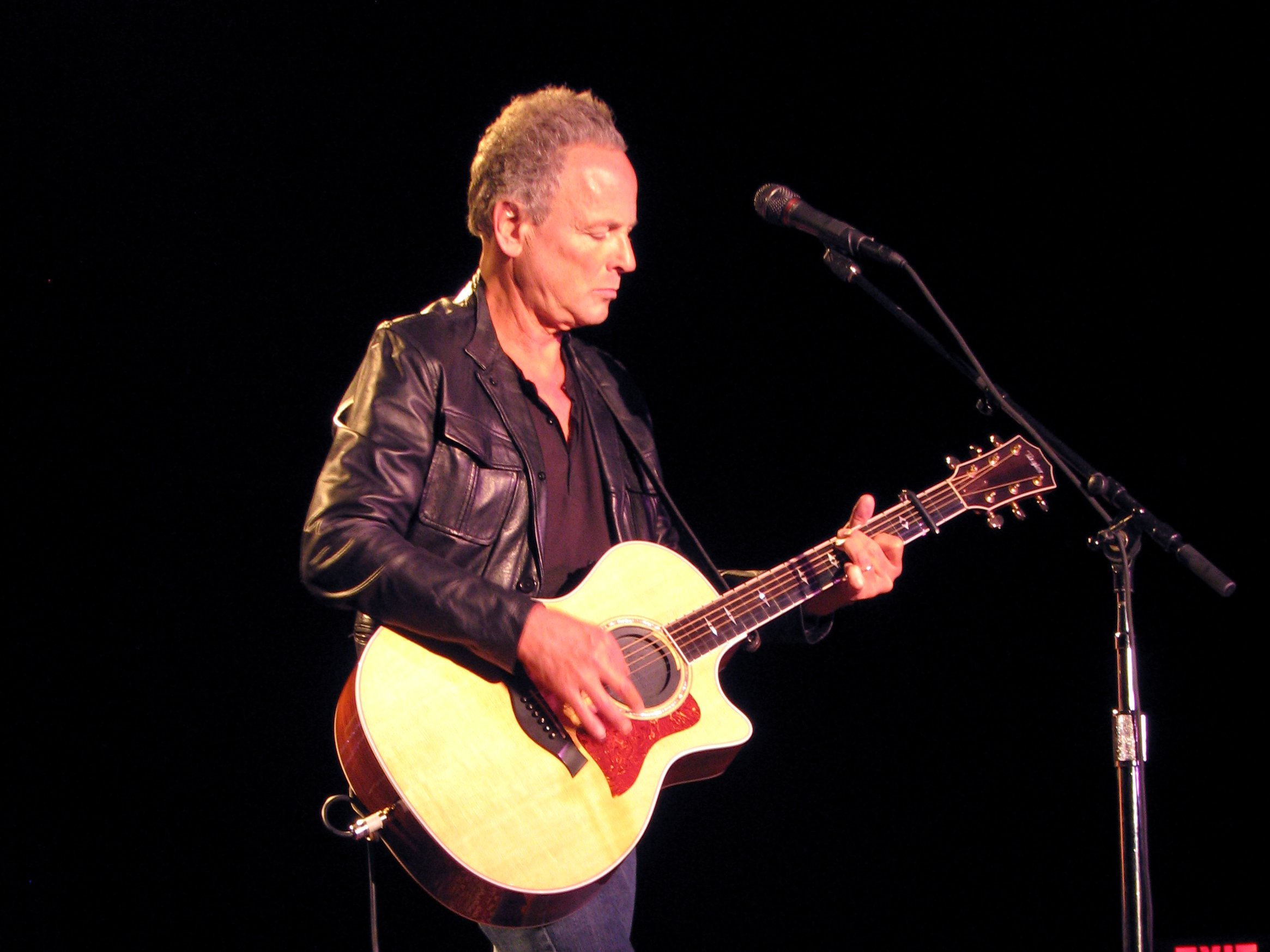
Buckingham performing at the Neighborhood Theatre in Charlotte, North Carolina, 2012

Buckingham began a "solo" (no backing band) tour of the United States on May 3, 2012, in Solana Beach, California and in November 2012 released a completely solo live album One Man Show via digital download at iTunes that was recorded from a single night in Des Moines, Iowa. One Man Show was released on Buckingham's own label Buckingham Records LLC.

=== 2013–2015: Fleetwood Mac EP, world tour and Christine McVie reunion ===
The "Live World" tour commenced on April 4, 2013, in Columbus, Ohio. On April 30, the band released their first new studio material since 2003's Say You Will via digital download on iTunes with the four-track EP containing three new songs from Buckingham and one new song from the Buckingham Nicks sessions ("Without You").

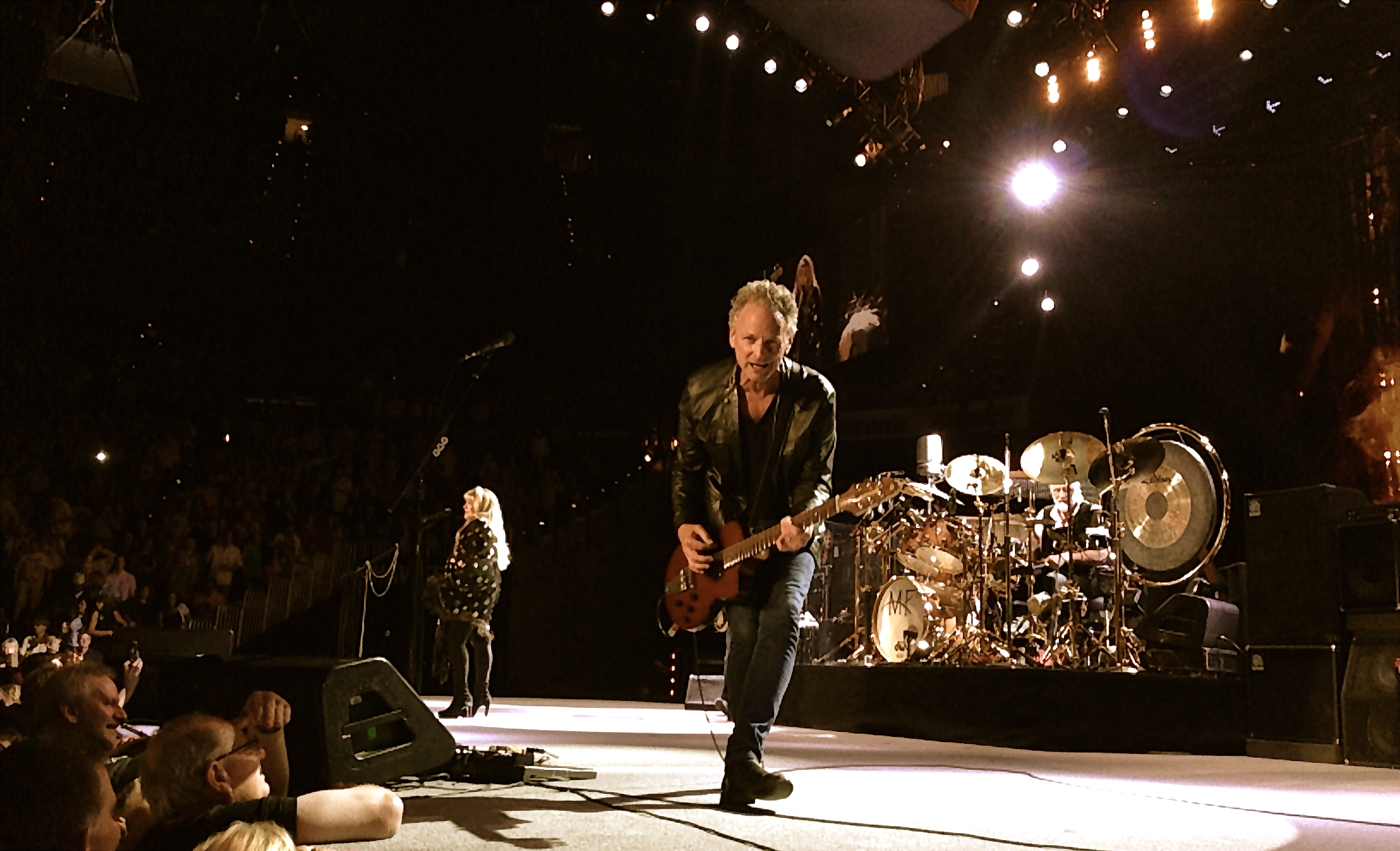
Buckingham performing with Fleetwood Mac in 2013

Buckingham is credited for three songs on the 2013 release Hesitation Marks, the eighth studio album of the band Nine Inch Nails.

On January 11, 2014, Mick Fleetwood announced that Christine McVie was rejoining Fleetwood Mac, and the news was confirmed on January 13 by the band's primary publicist, Liz Rosenberg. Rosenberg also stated that an official announcement regarding a new album and tour was forthcoming.

On with the Show, a 33-city North American Tour opened in Minneapolis, Minnesota on September 30, 2014. A series of May–June 2015 arena dates in the United Kingdom went on sale on November 14, selling out in minutes. Additional dates for the tour were added, extending into November.

In January 2015, Buckingham suggested that the new studio album and the new tour might be Fleetwood Mac's last act and that the band would cease to operate in 2015 or soon afterward. He concluded: "We're going to continue working on the new album, and the solo stuff will take a back seat for a year or two. A beautiful way to wrap up this last act". On the other hand, Mick Fleetwood stated that the new studio album could take a few years to complete and that they were waiting for contributions from Stevie Nicks, who had been ambivalent about committing to a new record.

=== 2016–2017: Lindsey Buckingham Christine McVie and Classic Concerts ===
In August 2016, Fleetwood said that while the band has "a huge amount of recorded music", virtually none of it featured Stevie Nicks. Buckingham and Christine McVie, however, had contributed multiple songs to the new project. Fleetwood told Ultimate Classic Rock, "She [McVie] ... wrote up a storm ... She and Lindsey could probably have a mighty strong duet album if they want. In truth, I hope it will come to more than that. There really are dozens of songs. And they're really good. So we'll see."

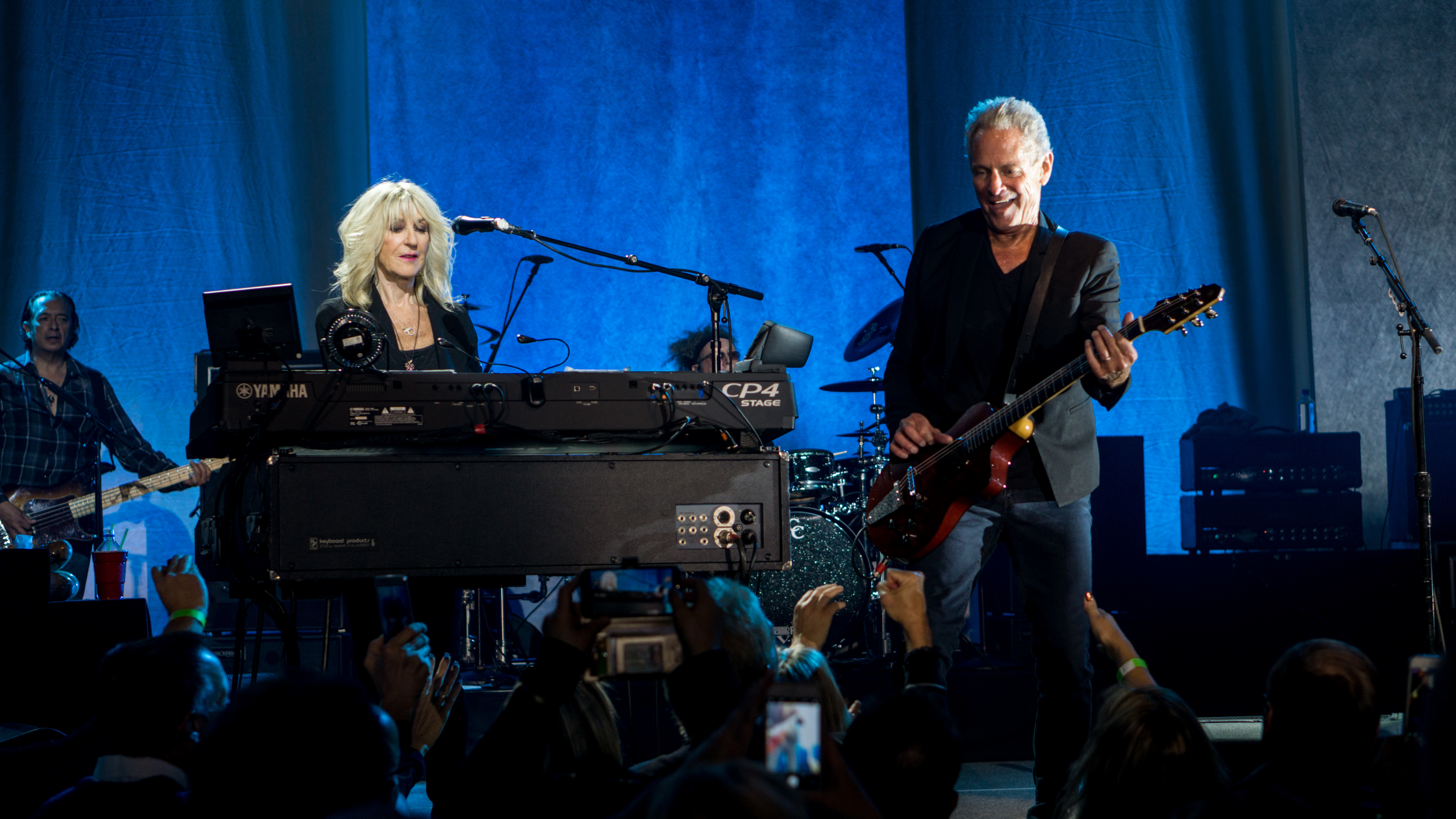
Buckingham and Christine McVie performing in 2017

Buckingham and Christine McVie announced a collaborative studio album titled Lindsey Buckingham Christine McVie, which also features Mick Fleetwood and John McVie. The album was originally planned as a Fleetwood Mac album. Stevie Nicks did not participate due to her preference for a solo tour with the Pretenders. Lindsey Buckingham/Christine McVie was released on June 9, 2017, and was preceded by the single, "In My World". A 38-date tour began on June 21, 2017, and ended on November 16.

=== 2018–present: Dismissal from Fleetwood Mac, Solo Anthology, and Lindsey Buckingham ===
Following Fleetwood Mac's performance at the MusiCares Person of the Year in January 2018, Buckingham was dismissed from the band. The reason was said to have been a disagreement about the nature of the tour, and in particular the question of whether newer or less well-known material would be included, as Buckingham wanted.

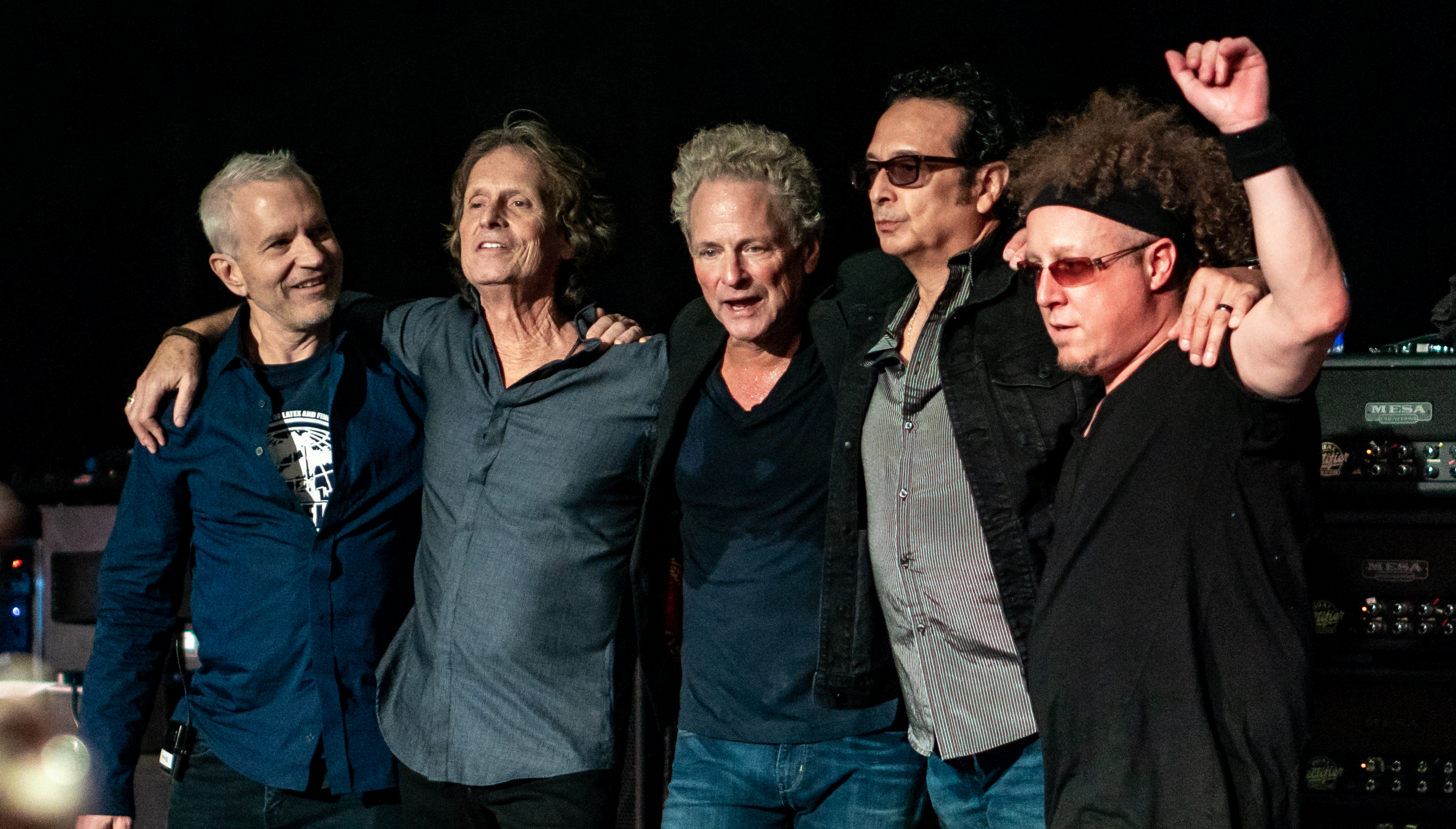
Buckingham and his solo band in 2018

Mick Fleetwood and the band appeared on CBS This Morning on April 25, 2018, and said that Buckingham would not sign off on a tour that the group had been planning for a year and that they had reached a "huge impasse" and "hit a brick wall". When asked if Buckingham had been fired, he said, "Well, we don't use that word because I think it's ugly." He also said that "Lindsey has huge amounts of respect and kudos to what he's done within the ranks of Fleetwood Mac and always will." In October 2018, Buckingham filed a lawsuit against Fleetwood Mac for breach of fiduciary duty, breach of oral contract, and intentional interference with prospective economic advantage, among other charges; the lawsuit was settled in December of the same year.

Buckingham stated he learned about the firing after receiving a call from Fleetwood Mac manager Irving Azoff with a message for Buckingham from Stevie Nicks. Buckingham stated that Azoff told him: "Stevie never wants to be on a stage with you again." According to Azoff, on the evening of MusiCares, just before the band's set, Nicks had taken issue with Buckingham’s outburst over the intro music—the studio recording of Nicks' song "Rhiannon"—and the way he had "smirked" during Nicks' thank-you speech. Buckingham conceded that "It wasn't about it being 'Rhiannon'. It just undermined the impact of our entrance. That's me being very specific about the right and wrong way to do something." Days later, Buckingham called Azoff and asked, "Is Stevie leaving the band, or am I getting kicked out?" Azoff told him that he was "getting ousted" from the band after Nicks gave the other band members "an ultimatum: Either [Buckingham] go[es] or she's going to go," to which they decided to fire him. Former Tom Petty and the Heartbreakers guitarist Mike Campbell and Neil Finn of Split Enz and Crowded House were named to replace Buckingham. Buckingham has stated since that he would be open to rejoining Fleetwood Mac but does not foresee it in the future.

In August 2018, Reprise issued a press release for a new solo anthology Solo Anthology: The Best of Lindsey Buckingham that focused on Buckingham's solo career since 1981. The anthology was released on October 5, 2018, followed two days later by a solo tour throughout North America. In 2020, Buckingham collaborated with The Killers on their studio album Imploding the Mirage, playing guitar on the first single "Caution". In 2021, Buckingham played on a new version of "The Past Is the Past" by Brandy Clark, issued as a bonus track on the deluxe edition of her album Your Life Is a Record.

On June 8, 2021, Buckingham announced his seventh solo studio album, Lindsey Buckingham, with the single "I Don't Mind". The second single from the album, "On the Wrong Side", was released on July 23, 2021. The record was released on September 17, 2021, and his tour to support it started the same month.

Buckingham also guested on Halsey's 2021 studio album If I Can't Have Love, I Want Power. In 2022, Buckingham would again join with The Killers on August 27, 2022, to perform his guitar solo from "Caution" live on stage in Los Angeles with the band, along with a cover of Fleetwood Mac's "Go Your Own Way". Buckingham along with the Killers were joined with Johnny Marr of The Smiths to perform "Mr. Brightside" together to close out the concert.

Buckingham voiced the character The Buck, a radio host, in the 2026 video game Grand Theft Auto VI.

Buckingham is currently recording his eighth studio album, which he hopes to release sometime in 2026.

== Personal life ==
Buckingham was in the same high school as Stevie Nicks but a year behind her. He started a relationship with Nicks after the breakup of their band Fritz. He then suffered from a bout of mononucleosis, which delayed their move to Los Angeles in 1971. They recorded a studio album together before joining Fleetwood Mac in 1975, while their relationship had broken down by 1977. The breakup was chronicled in a number of songs written by the two, such as "Silver Springs" and "Dreams" by Nicks and "Go Your Own Way" and "Second Hand News" by Buckingham.

Buckingham had his first child with Kristen Messner on July 8, 1998. Buckingham and Messner were married in 2000 and later had two daughters. Buckingham and Messner, who is a photographer and interior designer, have developed homes in the Brentwood area of Los Angeles, California. Buckingham and Messner had filed for divorce in 2021, but ultimately decided to mend their relationship.

Buckingham underwent emergency open heart surgery in February 2019. His wife said that "the life-saving procedure caused vocal cord damage, the permanency of which is unclear", though he ultimately recovered. Buckingham was the target of an alleged assault with an unknown substance in Santa Monica, California, on April 1, 2026; the suspect reportedly had a history of stalking Buckingham. Buckingham was not injured in the incident.

== Musical style ==
Unlike most rock guitarists, Buckingham does not play with a pick; instead, he almost exclusively plays fingerstyle and tends to strum with his middle and ring fingers. Initially after joining Fleetwood Mac, Buckingham used a Gibson Les Paul Custom. Before the band, a Fender Telecaster was his main guitar, and was used on his first Fleetwood Mac studio album alongside Fender Stratocasters fitted with an Alembic Blaster. In 1978, he worked with Rick Turner, future owner and founder of The Renaissance Guitar Company, to create the Model One guitar. He has used it extensively since, both with Fleetwood Mac and for his solo efforts. He uses a Taylor Guitar 814ce or a Rick Turner Renaissance RS6 for most of his acoustic performances but uses a custom-made Gibson Chet Atkins guitar for his live performances of "Big Love". He has also used an Ovation Balladeer in the past from the early 1970s to the late 1980s. In the 1980s, Buckingham also used the Fairlight CMI sampling synthesizer on Go Insane and Tango in the Night.

His influences include Brian Wilson and Phil Spector. Buckingham has also worked extensively as a producer both for Fleetwood Mac and for his solo work. "I think of myself as a stylist, and the process of writing a song is part and parcel with putting it together in the studio."

In an interview with Guitar World Acoustic Magazine, Buckingham said:

I've always believed that you play to highlight the song, not to highlight the player. The song is all that matters. There are two ways you can choose to go. You can try to be someone like Eddie Van Halen, who is a great guitarist, a virtuoso. Yet he doesn't make good records because what he plays is totally lost in the context of this band's music. Then there are guitar players like Chet Atkins, who weren't out there trying to show themselves off as guitarists per se, but were using the guitar as a tool to make good records. I remember loving Chet's work when I was a kid, but it was only later, when I really listened to his guitar parts, that I realized how much they were a part of the song's fabric, and how much you'd be going 'Oh, that song just isn't working' if they weren't there.

In another interview to Guitar World, he said about using his fingers rather than a plectrum:

I started playing very young and from early on, the people I was listening to had some element of finger style. Probably the first guitarist I was emulating was Scotty Moore, when I was maybe 6 or 7. And he played with a pick, but he also used fingers. And a lot of the session players, like Chet Atkins, they played with fingers or a pick. Then I listened to a certain amount of light classical guitar playing. And of course later on, when the first wave of rock 'n' roll kind of fell away, folk music was very popular and very influential in my style. So it was really less of a choice than what I fell into. I use a pick occasionally. I certainly use it more in the studio when you want to get a certain tone. But it's just the way I came up. I wasn't taught. I just sort of figured things out on my own terms. I guess that was one of the ways that I became comfortable and it just kind of set in.

== In popular culture ==
- Buckingham has been portrayed by Bill Hader in a recurring sketch titled "What Up with That?" on NBC's Saturday Night Live. The show features Hader as Buckingham, who repeatedly appears as a guest on a talk show in the sketch; however, the segment always runs out of time before he can be interviewed. Buckingham has stated he does not understand the parody, though he considers it a compliment, and he eventually appeared as himself on the May 14, 2011 episode during this sketch, offering to explain why there were two Lindsey Buckinghams.
- Buckingham plays himself and sings in episode 3 of the Showtime series Roadies.

== Discography ==
=== Studio albums ===
| Year | Title | Peak chart positions | | | | Additional notes |
| Year | Title | US | CAN | SWE | UK | Additional notes |
|---|---|---|---|---|---|---|
| 1973 | Buckingham Nicks | 11 | 91 | 8 | 6 | Debut studio album featuring duo of Buckingham and Stevie Nicks before they joined Fleetwood Mac. The album did not appear on any national record charts upon its original release in 1973. It later charted in several countries after it was reissued in September 2025. |
| 1981 | Law and Order | 32 | 27 | — | — | |
| 1984 | Go Insane | 45 | — | 33 | — | |
| 1992 | Out of the Cradle | 128 | 70 | 28 | 51 | |
| 2006 | Under the Skin | 80 | — | — | — | |
| 2008 | Gift of Screws | 48 | — | 35 | 59 | |
| 2011 | Seeds We Sow | 45 | 92 | — | 82 | |
| 2017 | Lindsey Buckingham Christine McVie | 17 | 35 | 28 | 5 | The album started out as Fleetwood Mac's eighteenth studio album |
| 2021 | Lindsey Buckingham | — | — | — | 25 | |
"—" denotes a recording that did not chart or was not released in that territory.

=== With Fleetwood Mac ===
- Fleetwood Mac (1975)
- Rumours (1977)
- Tusk (1979)
- Mirage (1982)
- Tango in the Night (1987)
- Behind the Mask (1990) – acoustic guitar on the title track
- Time (1995) – backing vocals on "Nothing Without You"
- Say You Will (2003)

=== Live albums ===
| Year | Title | Peak chart positions | |
| Year | Title | US | SWE |
|---|---|---|---|
| 2008 | Live at the Bass Performance Hall | 186 | 48 |
| 2011 | Songs from the Small Machine: Live in L.A at Saban Theatre in Beverly Hills, CA / 2011 | — | — |
| 2012 | One Man Show | — | — |
"—" denotes a recording that did not chart or was not released in that territory.

=== Compilation albums ===
| Year | Title | Peak chart positions | |
| Year | Title | US | UK |
|---|---|---|---|
| 1992 | Words and Music (A Retrospective) | — | — |
| 2018 | Solo Anthology: The Best of Lindsey Buckingham | 53 | 78 |
| 2024 | 20th Century Lindsey | — | — |
"—" denotes a recording that did not chart or was not released in that territory.

=== Singles ===
| Year | Title | Peak chart positions | | | | | | | | Album |
| Year | Title | US | US Rock | US Adult | AUS | CAN | GER | NL | UK | Album |
|---|---|---|---|---|---|---|---|---|---|---|
| 1981 | "Trouble" | 9 | 12 | 14 | 1 | 7 | 39 | 41 | 31 | Law and Order |
| 1982 | "It Was I" | — (Note: "It Was I" did not enter the Billboard Hot 100, but peaked at number 10 on the Bubbling Under Hot 100 Singles chart.) | — | — | 74 | — | — | — | — | Law and Order |
| 1982 | "The Visitor (Bwana)" | — | — | — | — | — | — | — | — (Note: "The Visitor" did not enter the top 100 of the UK singles chart, but peaked at number 127 on the Record Business chart.) | Law and Order |
| 1982 | "Mary Lee Jones" | — | — | — | — | — | — | — | — (Note: "Mary Lee Jones" did not enter the top 100 of the UK singles chart, but peaked at number 121 on the Record Business chart.) | Law and Order |
| 1983 | "Holiday Road" | 82 | — | — | — | — | — | — | — | National Lampoon's Vacation soundtrack |
| 1984 | "Go Insane" | 23 | 4 | — | 100 | 57 | — | — | — | Go Insane |
| 1984 | "Slow Dancing" | — (Note: "Slow Dancing" did not enter the Billboard Hot 100, but peaked at number 6 on the Bubbling Under Hot 100 Singles chart.) | — | — | — | — | — | — | — | Go Insane |
| 1992 | "Wrong" | — | 23 | — | — | 50 | — | — | — | Out of the Cradle |
| 1992 | "Countdown" | — | 38 | 32 | 131 | 29 | 66 | 64 | — | Out of the Cradle |
| 1992 | "Soul Drifter" | — | — | 38 | — | 31 | 53 | — | — | Out of the Cradle |
| 1993 | "Don't Look Down" | — | — | — | — | 59 | — | — | — | Out of the Cradle |
| 1996 | "Twisted" (with Stevie Nicks) | — | — | — | — | 43 | — | — | — | Twister |
| 2006 | "Show You How" | — | — | — | — | — | — | — | — | Under the Skin |
| 2008 | "Did You Miss Me" | — | — | — | — | — | — | — | — | Gift of Screws |
| 2008 | "Gift of Screws EP" | — | — | — | — | — | — | — | — | Gift of Screws |
| 2011 | "Holiday Road" (Live) | — | — | — | — | — | — | — | — | Non-album single |
| 2011 | "Seeds We Sow" | — | — | — | — | — | — | — | — | Seeds We Sow |
| 2011 | "In Our Own Time" | — | — | — | — | — | — | — | — | Seeds We Sow |
| 2011 | "When She Comes Down" | — | — | — | — | — | — | — | — | Seeds We Sow |
| 2011 | "The End of Time" | — | — | — | — | — | — | — | — | Seeds We Sow |
| 2015 | "Holiday Road"/"Dancin' Across the USA" | — | — | — | — | — | — | — | — | National Lampoon's Vacation soundtrack |
| 2021 | "I Don't Mind" | — | — | — | — | — | — | — | — | Lindsey Buckingham |
| 2021 | "On the Wrong Side" | — | — | — | — | — | — | — | — | Lindsey Buckingham |
| 2021 | "Scream" | — | — | — | — | — | — | — | — | Lindsey Buckingham |
"—" denotes a recording that did not chart or was not released in that territory.

=== Soundtrack appearances ===
| Year | Title | Soundtrack | Additional notes |
|---|---|---|---|
| 1983 | "Holiday Road" | National Lampoon's Vacation | – |
| 1983 | "Dancing Across the USA" | National Lampoon's Vacation | – |
| 1985 | "Time Bomb Town" | Back to the Future | – |
| 1994 | "On the Wrong Side" | With Honors | – |
| 1996 | "Twisted" | Twister | duet with Nicks |
| 2005 | "Shut Us Down" | Elizabethtown | uncut version |
| 2006 | "Big Love" | Elizabethtown Vol 2 | live soundstage performance |
| 2012 | "Sick of You" | This Is 40 | – |
| 2012 | "Brother and Sister" | This Is 40 | featuring Norah Jones |
| 2012 | "She Acts Like You" | This Is 40 | – |

=== Other appearances ===
| Year | Title | Album | Additional notes |
|---|---|---|---|
| 2013 | "Copy of a" | Hesitation Marks | Credited as guitar |
| 2013 | "In Two" | Hesitation Marks | Credited as guitar |
| 2013 | "While I'm Still Here" | Hesitation Marks | Credited as guitar |
| 2020 | "Caution" | Imploding the Mirage | Guitar (track 4) |
| 2021 | "The Past Is the Past" | Your Life Is a Record | Guitar and vocals on deluxe edition version of "The Past Is the Past" |
| 2025 | "Secrets" | Something Beautiful (deluxe edition) | Guitar and co-writer |

== Music videos ==
- "Trouble" (1981)
- "It Was I" (1981)
- "Holiday Road" (1983)
- "Go Insane" (1984)
- "Slow Dancing" (1984)
- "Wrong" (1992)
- "Countdown" (1992)
- "Soul Drifter" (1992)
- "Don't Look Down" (1993)
- "Show You How" (2006)
- "It Was You" (2006)
- "Shut Us Down" (2006)
- "Stars Are Crazy" (performance clip, 2011)
- "In Our Own Time" (performance clip, 2011)
