= Robert Schwartzman =

American musician and actor (born 1982)

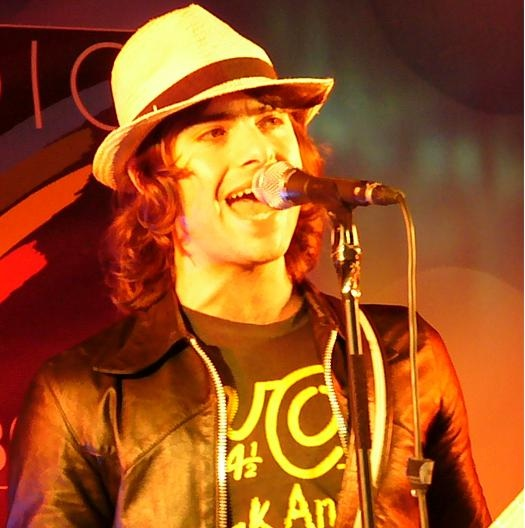
- Schwartzman performing in 2008
- Born: Robert Coppola Schwartzman; December 24, 1982 (age 43); Los Angeles, California, U.S.
- Other name: Robert Carmine
- Occupations: Actor; musician; director; screenwriter
- Years active: 1998–present
- Spouse: Zoey Grossman (m. 2017)
- Children: 2
- Parents: Jack Schwartzman (father); Talia Shire (mother)
- Relatives: Coppola family
- Musical career
- Genres: Alternative rock; power pop
- Instruments: Vocals; guitar
- Years active: 1999–present
- Labels: Geffen; California Dreamin'; Beachwood Park
- Member of: Rooney

Robert Coppola Schwartzman (born December 24, 1982), also known as Robert Carmine, is an American filmmaker, actor, and musician. A member of the Coppola family, he is best known as the lead vocalist of the rock band Rooney. Schwartzman directed the films Dreamland (2016), The Unicorn (2018), and The Argument (2020), acted in his cousin Sofia Coppola's projects Lick the Star (1998) and The Virgin Suicides (1999), and starred in The Princess Diaries (2001).

== Early life ==
Schwartzman was born in Los Angeles, California, to actress Talia Shire (née Coppola) and film producer Jack Schwartzman. His paternal grandparents were Ashkenazi Jews, while his mother is an Italian-American Catholic. His older brother, Jason Schwartzman, is also an actor and musician. His paternal half-siblings are Stephanie and cinematographer John Schwartzman, while his maternal half-brother is Matthew Shire.

As a member of the Coppola family, many of his relatives are also involved in the entertainment industry—he is the nephew of filmmaker Francis Ford Coppola and academic August Coppola; great-nephew of opera conductor Anton Coppola; the cousin of actor Nicolas Cage and filmmakers Sofia Coppola, Roman Coppola, and Christopher Coppola; and the grandson of Coppola family matriarch Italia Coppola (née Pennino) and composer Carmine Coppola.

== Career ==
Schwartzman attended Windward School in Los Angeles and formed the band Rooney with some friends in 1999, while in his junior year. He left the band temporarily when he attended Eugene Lang College in New York City in 2001. In his first semester at college, Schwartzman wrote songs in his dorm room and flew home every month to perform new material for Rooney. Most of the songs on the first Rooney album were written while he was at college, and it was during this time that he realized that he wanted to go back to Los Angeles and pursue a professional career in music with Rooney.

In early 2002, shortly after Schwartzman left school, Rooney was signed to Geffen/Interscope Records. Rooney recorded their self-titled debut album in June 2002. They also were selected by his friend Johnny Ramone for the Ramones tribute album We're a Happy Family, which was released in early 2003. Rooney opened for Weezer during their headlining tour in the summer of 2002; it was their first national support slot. The next tour the band landed was with the Strokes. Rooney was finally released in May 2003, and has since sold approximately 500,000 copies. The band had a cameo appearance in an episode of The O.C., "The Third Wheel". Their song "Blueside" was featured on the Tiger Woods PGA Tour 2004 soundtrack, and their song "I'm Shakin'" was featured on an episode of the daytime soap opera All My Children.

On November 16, 2004, the band issued their first DVD, Spit and Sweat. The hour-long documentary features interviews with the band and live performances from Los Angeles. The DVD also includes the videos for "Blueside", "I'm Shakin'", "If It Were Up to Me", and "Popstars", which was released as a never-before-seen video. Following their 2006 summer tour, the band began the recording sessions for their second album. Three songs from previous sessions ("Don't Come Around Again", "Paralyzed", and "Tell Me Soon"), were kept for their new album, Calling the World. On March 6, 2007, the single "When Did Your Heart Go Missing?" was released on their MySpace account, and was also used in commercials for the TV show Beauty and the Geek. The album was released to stores July 17, 2007, and debuted at #42 on the Billboard Top 100 Albums chart.

Schwartzman released his first solo album, Double Capricorn, on October 25, 2011. All profits from the sale of the album were to be donated to the Tibetan Healing Fund, to help build a new birthing center. He scored the 2013 film Palo Alto with Dev Hynes of Blood Orange.

In 2016, Schwartzman wrote and directed Dreamland, starring Johnny Simmons and Amy Landecker. It had its world premiere at the Tribeca Film Festival on April 14, 2016. It was released in a limited release and through video on demand on November 11, 2016. In 2018, he directed The Unicorn, starring Lauren Lapkus and Nick Rutherford. It had its world premiere at South by Southwest on March 10, 2018.

=== Utopia Media ===
In 2018, Schwartzman co-founded Utopia Media, a "filmmaker first" distribution company. In 2020, Utopia Media announced the launch of Altavod, a platform for filmmakers to more easily distribute and profit from their films. Altavod originally launched in partnership with Unanimous Media's documentary Jump Shot, a documentary that uncovered the inspiring true story of the forgotten basketball legend who developed, pioneered, and popularized the modern-day jump shot. Stephen Curry served as an executive producer on the film, which was distributed by Aspiration Media.

In 2020, Utopia Media released a 4K restoration of the 1980s cult-classic Rad by director Hal Needham. It starred Schwartzman's mother, Talia Shire, and was executive produced by his father, Jack Schwartzman. The film made its belated Blu-ray and 4K Ultra HD debut in May 2020, from Vinegar Syndrome and Utopia Distribution.

== Filmography ==
Film and television
Year	Title	Role	Notes
1998	Lick the Star	Greg	Short film
1999	The Virgin Suicides	Paul Baldino	
2001	The Princess Diaries	Michael Moscovitz	
2001	A New Princess (The Making of The Princess Diaries)	Himself	
2002	Krystal Harris - "Supergirl"	Michael Moscovitz	Uncredited; music video
2004	The O.C.	Himself	Episode: "The Third Wheel"
2004	Rooney: Spit and Sweat	Himself	
2007	Look	Gas Station Kid #1	
2010	Somewhere	—N/a	Uncredited
2011	New Romance	—N/a	Uncredited; short film
2012	Casino Moon	Seymour	Short film
2012	Modern/Love	Oscar	Short film
2013	Palo Alto	—N/a	Film score; co-credited with Dev Hynes
2016	Dreamland	—N/a	Director
2017	It Happened in L.A.	Ben	
2018	The Unicorn	—N/a	Director
2019	Lost Transmissions	Darron	
2020	The Argument	—N/a	Director
2023	Hung Up on a Dream: The Zombies Documentary	—N/a	Director
2023	The Good Half	—N/a	Director

== Discography ==
=== Composer ===
- Rooney - Rooney (2003)
- Rooney - Calling the World (2007)
- Ben Lee - Ripe (co-writer; song "Sex Without Love", 2007)
- Demi Lovato - Don't Forget (co-writer; song "Party", 2008)
- Rooney - "Iron Man: Armored Adventures Theme Song" (2009)
- Rooney - Wild One EP (2009; first only available through private band distribution, but later released on Amazon.com in 2010, and was soon available at other online-only media outlets including iTunes and Zune)
- Rooney - Eureka, excluding track 4 (2010)
- SoloBob - Fantastic 15 (2010; released via Amazon.com)
- Robert Schwartzman - Double Capricorn (2011)
- We the Kings - Sunshine State of Mind (co-writer; song "Friday is Forever", 2011)
- StarSystem - Pleasure District EP (2013)
- Rooney - Washed Away (2016)

=== Producer ===
- Clique Girlz - Incredible (2008)
- Clique Girlz - Clique Girlz EP (2008)
- Clique Girlz - "Then I Woke Up/Heaven Is a Place on Earth" (2008)

== See also ==
- Coppola family tree
