= Rooney (album) =

Studio album by Rooney
- Released: May 20, 2003
- Genres: Alternative rock; power pop; pop rock
- Length: 39:04
- Label: Geffen
- Producers: Keith Forsey; Brian Reeves; Jimmy Iovine; Adam Kasper

Rooney chronology
Rooney (2003)	Calling the World (2007)

Singles from Rooney
- 1. "If It Were Up to Me" Released: 2002; 2. "Blueside" Released: 2003; 3. "I'm Shakin'" Released: 2004

Rooney is the debut studio album by American alternative rock band Rooney. It was released on May 20, 2003, through Geffen Records. The cover features a recreation of the flag of California. The track "Blueside" was featured in the movie of The Princess Diaries. The track "I'm a Terrible Person" was used in a commercial of Carolina Herrera's perfume. The track "I'm Shakin" was featured in the series premiere of Royal Pains and also featured in an episode of the first season of The O.C., in which the band appeared as themselves.

== Critical reception ==
Professional ratings
Aggregate scores
Source	Rating
Metacritic	67/100
Review scores
Source	Rating
AllMusic	3.5/5 stars
Alternative Press	3/5
Rolling Stone	2/5 stars
PopMatters	8/10 stars
Q	4/5 stars

The album received generally positive reviews from music critics. At Metacritic, the album has received an average score of 67/100, indicating "generally favorable reviews".

== Track listing ==
All tracks are written by Robert Schwartzman.

No.	Title	Length
1.	"Blueside"	3:18
2.	"Stay Away"	3:32
3.	"If It Were Up to Me"	3:00
4.	"I'm a Terrible Person"	2:46
5.	"Popstars"	4:07
6.	"I'm Shakin'"	3:34
7.	"Daisy Duke"	3:47
8.	"Sorry Sorry"	3:07
9.	"That Girl Has Love"	3:31
10.	"Simply Because"	4:03
11.	"Losing All Control"	4:19
Total length:		39:04

UK bonus tracks
No.	Title	Length
12.	"The Floor"	2:57
13.	"Make Some Noise"	4:17

== Personnel ==
- Robert Schwartzman – lead vocals, rhythm guitar
- Taylor Locke – lead guitar
- Matthew Winter – bass guitar
- Ned Brower – backing vocals, drums
- Louie Stephens – keyboards, piano
