= Gamers: The Movie =

- Film poster
- Directed by: Chris Folino
- Written by: Chris Folino
- Produced by: Chris Folino
- Starring: Kevin Sherwood; Kevin Kirkpatrick; Joe Nieves; Scott Allen Rinker; Dave Hanson
- Cinematography: Roberto "Tito" Blasini
- Music by: Tom Hite; Kevin Sherwood
- Release date: 2006
- Country: United States
- Language: English

Gamers: The Movie (or simply Gamers) is an independent 2006 mockumentary film written, directed and produced by Chris Folino. The film follows four friends who, saddled with "four of the worst jobs known to man", attempt to set the world record for playing Demons, Nymphs, and Dragons (DND), a Dungeons & Dragons-like game.

Filmed in only six days and entirely self-financed with $60,000 from credit cards, the film featured several 1980s stars in supporting roles: Kelly Le Brock (Weird Science), Beverly D'Angelo (Entourage, National Lampoon's Vacation), and William Katt (The Greatest American Hero). The soundtrack also includes songs by Loverboy and other 1980s bands.

Indie film web sites Indie Film Nation and bumscorner.com named Gamers the "Best Film of 2006." It also received the award for Best Screenplay at the 2006 Melbourne Underground Film Festival.
