= Eureka (Rooney album) =

Studio album by Rooney
- Released: June 8, 2010
- Genres: Alternative rock; power pop
- Length: 42:37
- Label: California Dreamin'
- Producer: Rooney

Rooney chronology
Calling the World (2007)	Eureka (2010)	Washed Away (2016)

Singles from Eureka
- 1. "I Can't Get Enough" Released: May 11, 2010; 2. "Holdin' On" Released: 2011

Professional ratings
Aggregate scores
Source	Rating
Metacritic	47/100
Review scores
Source	Rating
AllMusic	2.5/5 stars
Alternative Press	3/5 stars
American Songwriter	3/5 stars
The A.V. Club	D
Consequence of Sound	3.5/5 stars
Paste	3.6/10
PopMatters	5/10
Rolling Stone	2/5 stars
Slant Magazine	2/5 stars
Sputnikmusic	2.0/5

Eureka is the third studio album by American alternative rock band Rooney. It was released on June 8, 2010, through California Dreamin' Records.

The album is the band's first to be released on California Dreamin', their own label. The album was released on CD and vinyl, with a deluxe digital edition featuring four bonus tracks. The band took pre-orders for the album where fans could choose from an autographed CD or vinyl in addition to an exclusive t-shirt. The entire album was streamed a week before its release date on the group's MySpace page. Bassist Matthew Winter departed from the band after the recording of the album. While he is featured on the recording of the album, he is not on the album cover.

On May 14, 2010 the band debuted the video for first single "I Can't Get Enough." A second single "Holdin' On" was released early in 2011. The album debuted on the Billboard 200 chart at number 153. It received mixed reviews.

== Track listing ==
All tracks are written by Robert Schwartzman, except where noted.

Eureka track listing
No.	Title	Writer(s)	Length
1.	"Holdin' On"		4:07
2.	"I Can't Get Enough"		3:06
3.	"Only Friend"		3:51
4.	"Into the Blue"	Louie Stephens	3:33
5.	"All or Nothing"		3:55
6.	"The Hunch"	Ned Brower; Taylor Locke	2:30
7.	"I Don't Wanna Lose You"		3:10
8.	"Stars and Stripes"		4:00
9.	"Go On"		3:20
10.	"You're What I'm Looking For"		3:37
11.	"Not in My House"		3:29
12.	"Don't Look at Me"		3:59
Total length:			42:37

Deluxe edition bonus tracks
No.	Title	Length
13.	"Pity"	3:26
14.	"I Don't Wanna Lose You" (acoustic version)	3:14
15.	"Can't Put Your Heart Around Everyone"	3:14
16.	"Go On" (acoustic version)	3:40

== Personnel ==
Rooney

- Robert Schwartzman – lead vocals, rhythm guitar
- Taylor Locke – lead guitar, backing vocals
- Matthew Winter – bass guitar
- Ned Brower – drums, backing vocals
- Louie Stephens – keyboards, piano, backing vocals

Additional musicians

- Todd Grossman – horns on "The Hunch"
