= Fallen (Dexter: Resurrection) =

- Dexter: Resurrection episode
- Episode no.: Season 2 Episode 2
- Directed by: Marcos Siega
- Written by: Scott Buck
- Cinematography by: Joe Collins
- Editing by: Katie Ennis
- Original air date: November 6, 2026
- Running time: 58 minutes

Guest appearance
- Gabriel Luna as Ray Ballard

Episode chronology
← Previous "Risky Business"	Next → "Live Free and Die"

"Fallen" is the second episode of the second season of the American crime drama mystery television series Dexter: Resurrection, sequel to Dexter and Dexter: New Blood. It is the 12th overall episode of the series and was written by consulting producer Scott Buck, and directed by executive producer Marcos Siega. It was released on Paramount+ with Showtime on November 6, 2026, and aired on Showtime two days later.

The series is set following the events of Dexter: New Blood, and it follows Dexter Morgan, who has recovered from his near-fatal gunshot wound. After reuniting with his son Harrison in New York City, he tries to balance his life as a father and his life as a serial killer, as his past comes back to haunt him. In the episode, Dexter is approached by Charley over a potential partnership, while the police department is pressured into finding the Five Borough Killer.

The episode received highly positive reviews from critics, who praised the chemistry between Dexter and Charley, and character development.

== Plot ==
At a gym, Dexter tries to make sense of his midlife crisis, when he sees a TV report announcing Rapunzel's death. It is interrupted by the news of the murder committed by the Five Borough Killer. Harrison begins his first day at the NYPD Homicide division, and is shocked to learn that Fiona Mixon, the woman with whom he slept the previous night, is his training officer. Fiona's father is the precinct's Captain, and is upset that Wallace and Oliva have no leads on the Killer.

While dining with Harrison, Dexter is approached by Charley, who had been cleared of any involvement with Prater. Charley knows Dexter killed Al and suggests helping him in facilitating the search for two other serial killers in Prater's files, the Jaw Splitter and the Sleepy-Eyed Stranger. As Dexter debates on what to do, he is astonished when Joey Quinn shows up at his apartment. Quinn is relieved to see he is a alive and invites him out for drinks. He states he left the police to become a private investigator and is investigating Angel's disappearance. Dexter claims to not know much, but offers to help him in anything.

Dexter stalks Don Framt, following him to a strip club where he bonds with him. He begins to reconsider if he should actually kill him, but Harrison forbids him, as catching the New York Ripper is important for Wallace. Dexter then meets with Charley and agrees to kill the Splitter and the Stranger, getting Charley to schedule a meeting by pretending that Prater wants to meet them. Charley gets the Stranger, Ray Ballard, to come to a townhouse where Dexter can set up his kill room. He also gets Charley to get him a new boat, Slice of Life Too, to dispose of their bodies.

After seeing a report where Wallace considers his murder a "one-off", the Five Borough Killer calls the police to warn that he will kill someone on Broadway that night. Mixon decides to evacuate the area, with Harrison and Fiona leading. Dexter and Charley meet nearby to discuss their next strategy, when a body drops near them. Dexter sees the Five Borough Killer on the rooftop, and sets out to stop him before he goes after three more victims.

== Production ==
=== Development ===
The episode was written by consulting producer Scott Buck, and directed by executive producer Marcos Siega. This marked Buck's second writing credit, and Siega's eighth directing credit.

=== Casting ===
In July 2026, Gabriel Luna was confirmed to join the series in the role of Ray Ballard, a serial killer known as the Sleepy-Eyed Stranger.

== Reception ==
"Fallen" received highly positive reviews from critics. Louis Peitzman of Vulture gave the episode a 4 star rating out of 5 and wrote, "Change has never been Dexter's strong suit. The O.G. series' familiar formula turned it into a serialized show with a distinctly procedural vibe — not that there's anything wrong with that. After several years, however, a series that had once kept us on our toes became surprisingly predictable. How many times did Dexter take on a burgeoning serial killer partner while another Miami Metro cop tried to pin him as the Bay Harbor Butcher? And then came Dexter: Resurrection, a radical revamp that actually recaptured the joy of the show's glory days. Sometimes change is a good thing! It's fitting, then, that the second episode of the season sees Dexter learning that the best way to counter a midlife crisis is by doing something different."

Billie Doux of Doux Reviews gave the episode a 3 out of 5 rating and wrote, "Instead of yet another serial killer to oppose Dexter, this season's most interesting conflict could turn out to be Dexter versus Charley Brown. I enjoyed every scene they did together, especially the first one where she casually dropped in on Dexter and Harrison having lunch. I loved how Dexter pointedly wiped his steak knife clean and looked her right in the eye while holding it, ready to defend himself – or more accurately, his son."

Matthew Fox of Show Snob wrote, "I enjoyed the episode and all the storylines. I like how everything is coming together, including the return of Quinn (Desmond Harrington). Quinn told Dexter he's working as a private investigator for the families of the victims from Prater's vault, and he even wants Dexter's help. It feels like a ruse, but Dexter appears willing to play along, at least for now." Carissa Pavlica of TV Fanatic gave the episode a 4.25 star rating out of 5 and wrote, "Charley ticks a lot of the same boxes that Dexter's former lovers did, but she’s more controlled, which could work in their favor. Dexter: Resurrection isn't a romance, but does that mean Dex has to be lonely?"
