= Calling the World =

Studio album by Rooney
- Released: July 17, 2007
- Studios: Seedy Underbelly; Big Brown Sound; The Boat; The Pass; Encore Recording Studios; Sunset Sound
- Genres: Alternative rock; power pop
- Length: 43:54
- Label: Geffen
- Producer: John Fields

Rooney chronology
Rooney (2003)	Calling the World (2007)	Eureka (2010)

Singles from Calling the World
- 1. "When Did Your Heart Go Missing?" Released: March 6, 2007; 2. "I Should've Been After You" Released: 2007; 3. "Are You Afraid?" Released: 2008

Professional ratings
Aggregate scores
Source	Rating
Metacritic	60/100
Review scores
Source	Rating
Absolutepunk.net	89%
AllMusic	3/5 stars
Rolling Stone	3/5 stars
stv.tv	2/5 stars

Calling the World is the second studio album by American alternative rock band Rooney. It was released on July 17, 2007, through Geffen Records.

The album is the result of almost three years of recording, with over 50 songs recorded during the sessions. "When Did Your Heart Go Missing?", was released as the lead single. The album was produced by John "Strawberry" Fields. Rooney unveiled tracks from the album at a series of Monday night concerts in Los Angeles during March. The cover is a recreation of the cover to the self-titled debut album by the Doors and an homage to Rubber Soul by the Beatles. Alternative artwork was used on the album's European release.

Following its release, Calling the World debuted at number 42 on the U.S. Billboard 200, selling about 15,000 copies in its first week. A second single "I Should've Been After You" was released later in the year, while a third single, "Are You Afraid?" was released in some countries early in 2008.

== Track listing ==
All tracks are written by Robert Schwartzman.

Calling the World track listing
No.	Title	Length
1.	"Calling the World"	3:02
2.	"When Did Your Heart Go Missing?"	3:31
3.	"I Should've Been After You"	4:23
4.	"Tell Me Soon"	3:19
5.	"Don't Come Around Again"	4:01
6.	"Are You Afraid?"	4:11
7.	"Love Me or Leave Me"	3:12
8.	"Paralyzed"	2:34
9.	"What For"	3:43
10.	"All in Your Head"	3:43
11.	"Believe in Me"	4:02
12.	"Help Me Find My Way"	4:12
Total length:		43:54

Additional tracks

The album came with bonus songs depending on where it was purchased:

- Best Buy – "Get Away"
- iTunes – "Sleep Song"
- Target – "Jump in My Bed"
- UK bonus tracks – "Jump in My Bed" and "Get Away"
- Japan bonus tracks – all of the above
- France bonus tracks – "Get Away" and "Sleep Song"

== Personnel ==
Rooney

- Robert Schwartzman – lead vocals, rhythm guitar, producer
- Taylor Locke – lead guitar, backing vocals
- Matthew Winter – bass guitar
- Ned Brower – drums, backing vocals
- Louie Stephens – keyboards, piano

Additional musicians

- Richard Dodd – cello (tracks 4, 11)
- Leah Katz – viola (tracks 4, 11)
- Daphne Chen – violin (tracks 4, 11)
- Eric Gorfain – violin (tracks 4, 11)
- The Section Quartet – strings (tracks 4, 11)
- Dhani Harrison – additional vocals (track 1)
- Andy Sturmer – additional vocals (track 3)
- Ducky Carlisle – tambourine (track 5)
- Stephen Lu – string arrangement (tracks 1,4)

Production

- John Fields – producer, recording, mixing
- Ross Hogarth – engineer
- Ted Jensen – mastering
- Alyssa Pittaluga – assistant engineer
- Andrew Lynch – assistant engineer
- Atom – assistant engineer
- Mike Laza – assistant engineer
- Sara Killion – assistant engineer
- Scott Elgin – assistant engineer
- Steven Miller – additional recording
- Woody Jackson – additional recording
- Dorian "Wook" Crozier – drum tech
- Mike Fasano – drum tech
- Kevin Dobski – management
- Robert Hayes – management
- Martin Kierszenbaum – A&R
- Autumn de Wilde – photography
- Meeno – photography
- Sasha Eisenman – photography
- Janée Meadows – art direction, design
