= Bad Man (2025 film) =

2025 American action comedy film

- Theatrical release poster
- Directed by: Michael Diliberti
- Written by: Michael Diliberti; JJ Nelson
- Produced by: Warner Davis; Todd M. Friedman; Brian Levy; Shaun Sanghani; Montgomery Blencowe
- Starring: Seann William Scott; Johnny Simmons; Lovi Poe; Rob Riggle
- Cinematography: Garrett O'Brien
- Music by: Andrew Orkin
- Production companies: Entertainment 360; Hemlock Circle Productions; SSS Entertainment
- Distributed by: Vertical
- Release dates: August 24, 2025 (Sidewalk); September 5, 2025 (United States)
- Running time: 98 minutes
- Country: United States
- Language: English

Bad Man is a 2025 American action comedy film co-written and directed by Michael Diliberti. The film stars Seann William Scott, Johnny Simmons, Chance Perdomo (in his final film role), Lovi Poe, Kaitlin Doubleday, Ethan Suplee, and Rob Riggle.

The film premiered at the Sidewalk Film Festival on August 24, 2025 and was released by Vertical on September 5, 2025.

== Plot ==
In the town of Colt Lake, Tennessee, Travis is beaten by thugs and run over by a car, killing him. Police chief Sandy and cop Sam Evans are working on the murder case, when Bobby arrives, claiming to be from the State Special Narcotics Task Force. Bobby is apparently there to tackle drug related issues, and is later headed to Knoxville.

Bobby befriends Jasper at a local bar, and learns about a drug bust and informs Sam and Sandy about it. All three of them are able to capture Jasper under a drugs possession charge. Upon intense questioning, Jasper reveals that Travis was killed by drug dealers to make a point, and that there's a big $100,000 deal coming up. Sam walks into the police station, where Gary is lying unconscious, and Jasper missing from his cell. Gary admits that while he was smoking weed, someone came over the window to hit him over the head.

Sam is dating Izzy, whose father is Mayor Boone, while Bobby begins dating Tammy. Bobby and Sam go over to a gang hideout, where they are accosted by Dog Downer and his men with guns and a woman, Destiny. Afterwards, Bobby and Sam go to a school and talk to middle schoolers about police work.

Tammy and Izzy discuss their boyfriends, when Izzy badmouths Sam, which he overhears, causing him to be depressed. Sam drives out to meet Bobby at night and they go to see Destiny, who tells them she heard that someone is "cooking" (drugs) in the Old Abel auto yard. When Sam and Bobby, along with DJ, go over to Old Abel's, they step over a trip wire, triggering an explosion, and DJ is hospitalized for his wounds.

Mayor Boone gifts Sam a cigarette lighter, while Tammy tells Sam that Bobby is not who he seems. Sam discovers that Bobby is only a security guard at a strip mall and not a Narcotics agent. Sam confronts Bobby about it and punches him, when the cigarette lighter given by Mayor Boone falls down, which Bobby recognizes as having belonged to his brother Travis. So Bobby came to the town to get justice or revenge for his dead brother, and deduces that if the Mayor had Travis's lighter, then he must be in on the murder. Sam and Bobby head over to the Mayor's house, and show him the lighter. The Mayor discloses that he had an arrangement with Dog Downer's henchman, Shuggy, who was selling drugs and also gave him the lighter. There's going to be a $100,000 drug deal that night, on Dog Downer's property. Bobby handcuffs Sam and goes for the money and Travis's killer. But Izzy frees Sam by shooting his handcuffs.

At Dog Downer's place, Bobby takes Destiny as hostage, and Sam also arrives there. Dog Downer tells Bobby he can get either Downer's life or the money, but not both. A shootout ensues, after which everyone including Bobby is arrested.

Sam is back with Izzy and goes to meet Bobby in prison. They fist bump across the glass, indicating that everything went according to their original plan.

== Cast ==
- Seann William Scott as Bobby Gaines
- Johnny Simmons as Sam Evans
- Chance Perdomo as DJ
- Lovi Poe as Izzy
- Rob Riggle as Chief Sandy
- Ethan Suplee as Dog Downer
- Kaitlin Doubleday as Tammy
- Marcelle LeBlanc as Deb
- Erik Audé as Georgie
- John Patrick Jordan as Wayne
- Jack Conley as Mayor Boone
- Ian Roberts as Louis
- Paul Felder as Shuggy
- Kai Caster as Jasper
- Loren Dunn as Travis

== Production ==
In February 2024, it was announced that Seann William Scott, Rob Riggle, Johnny Simmons, Chance Perdomo and Lovi Poe would be added along with the cast which is directed by Michael Diliberti.

Filming took place in Helena, Alabama, and Graysville, Alabama, from December 11, 2023, to January 19, 2024, in which the film had wrapped.

Production was already completed when Perdomo died following a motorcycle crash in late-March 2024. This marks his final film appearance and is dedicated to his memory.

== Release ==
Bad Man was theatrically released by Vertical in September 5, 2025.

== Reception ==
UK Film Review praised Bad Man as a sharp crime comedy that reworks the classic “new sheriff in town” trope. The review highlighted Johnny Simmons’s nuanced performance and Seann William Scott’s comedic flair, noting the film’s satire of macho bravado and social posturing.

Bad Man entered the Top 10 across various streaming platforms including Amazon Prime in USA (#4), Paramount+ in Canada (#1), Starz across of the Middle East and North Africa as well as Germany on Apple TV.
