= Betrayal of the Dove =

- Directed by: Strathford Hamilton
- Written by: Robby Benson; Karla DeVito
- Starring: Helen Slater; Billy Zane; Harvey Korman; Heather Lind; David L. Lander
- Cinematography: David Lewis
- Edited by: Marcy Levitas Hamilton
- Music by: Sasha Matson
- Production company: Prism Entertainment
- Distributed by: LIVE Entertainment
- Release date: April 28, 1993
- Running time: 94 minutes
- Country: United States
- Language: English

Betrayal of the Dove is a 1993 American suspense film starring Helen Slater, Billy Zane, and Heather Lind with a screenplay co-written by actor-turned-author Robby Benson.

== Plot ==
Single mother Ellie West (Helen Slater), who is struggling to cut-free a deadbeat ex-husband (Alan Thicke), finds love with surgeon Dr. Jesse Peter (Billy Zane), who she meets at the consult for upcoming out-patient surgery. Encouraged by her close friend Una (Kelly LeBrock) and supportive boss Sid (Harvey Korman), she proceeds quickly but then has an unusual reaction when she is put under in the operating room, much to the dismay of the lead anesthesiologist (Stuart Pankin). Post-surgery, Ellie begins to see strange signs indicating that she and her daughter Autumn (Heather Lind) may be in danger but she does not know why or of whom to be wary. Furthermore, Norman, a timid admirer (David L. Lander) may be the key to piecing together the bizarre alarms of danger going off all around Ellie.

== Cast ==
- Helen Slater as Ellie West
- Billy Zane as Jesse Peter
- Alan Thicke as Jack West
- Kelly LeBrock as Una
- David L. Lander as Norman
- Heather Lind as Autumn West
- Harvey Korman as Sid
- Nedra Volz as Opal Vaneck
- Stuart Pankin as Dr. Gabe
- Bobbie Brown as Erotic Dancer
