= Rooney (band) =

American rock band

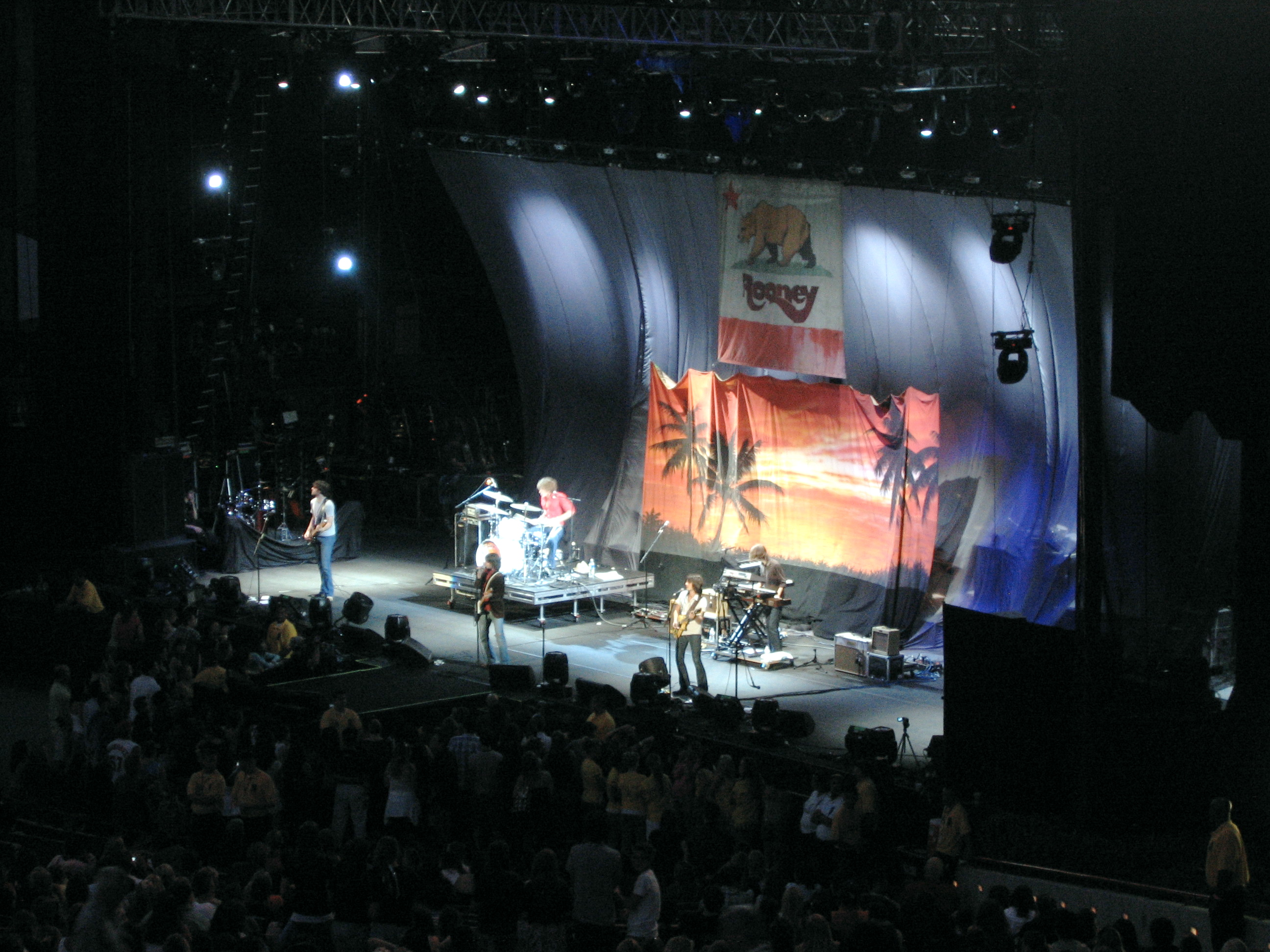
- Rooney in concert in 2006

Background information
- Origin: Los Angeles, California, U.S.
- Genres: Alternative rock, power pop, indie rock
- Years active: 1999–present
- Labels: California Dreamin', Geffen
- Members: Robert Schwartzman; Boaz Roberts; Sean Sobash; Maxwell Flanders; Matthew Jordan
- Past members: Teddy Briggs; Matthew Winter; Taylor Locke; Ned Brower; Louie Stephens; Brandon Schwartzel
- Website: www.rooneymusic.com

Rooney is the primary musical project of singer-songwriter Robert Schwartzman, evolving from its origin as an American rock band formed by high school friends in Los Angeles. Before Schwartzman decided to continue with the project and take it in a different direction, the band's most enduring line-up consisted of Schwartzman (lead vocals, guitar), Louie Stephens (keyboards, piano), Taylor Locke (lead guitar, backing vocals), Matthew Winter (bass guitar) and Ned Brower (drums, backing vocals). The band is named after Ed Rooney, the principal in Ferris Bueller's Day Off portrayed by actor Jeffrey Jones.

Their music is reminiscent of Jellyfish and Sloan. They have toured the nation with acts such as Weezer, The Strokes, Jane's Addiction, Travis, Keane, Audioslave, OK Go, Queens of the Stone Age, and Electric Light Orchestra.

== History ==
=== 1999–2002: Formation ===
Rooney first formed as Ed Rooney in 1999. The original lineup consisted of Robert Schwartzman, Matthew Winter on bass, Teddy Briggs on drums, and Matthew Star (née Srolestar) and Taylor Locke on guitar. Ned Brower replaced Briggs as drummer and Louie Stephens was added as keyboardist. They released a series of independent EPs called Deli Meats (2000), Plug It In (2001), and Mastedonia (2002). The band played multiple shows a month around Los Angeles and Anaheim and built up a strong following. Schwartzman moved to New York City to attend the Eugene Lang College at the New School. Instead of writing papers, he spent his dorm room nights writing new Rooney songs. Schwartzman sent his latest material to his bandmates in LA and flew home every month to perform. They recorded another demo CD with producers Keith Forsey and Brian Reeves. It consisted of the songs "Popstars," "If It Were Up To Me," and "Losing All Control." The demo made its way around LA and created buzz for the band at the major labels and management companies. Schwartzman decided to leave school and pursue the band full-time. Rooney played a show at the Roxy in early 2002 packed with Rooney fans and A&R representatives. After the show, the president of Geffen Records approached the band. After meeting all interested parties, the band went to Interscope to meet with Jimmy Iovine. Iovine expressed his love for the demo and said he would produce a couple of tracks himself if they signed with them. Based on their roster, Rooney signed the deal with Geffen/Interscope in 2002.

=== 2003–2004: Debut album ===
The band was interested in having Ric Ocasek produce the album. Ocasek got his hands on the demo CD and immediately contacted Schwartzman. They spent a lot of time talking about the songs and Ocasek wanted to use the demo songs on the album, feeling they were finished. Rooney flew out to New York City for a show with Phantom Planet at CBGB's. Schwartzman loved Ocasek's pink Jazzmaster, the one he used in The Cars. Ocasek said he could use it for the show, but Schwartzman took it back to LA and held on to it for quite a while. The label liked the idea of Ocasek producing the album, but since he loved the demos so much, everyone thought that Keith Forsey and Brian Reeves, who recorded the demos, should be given the opportunity.

Once the band and producers decided on the material and Taylor and Louie graduated from high school, they started recording at NRG Studios in North Hollywood, California. Most of basic tracking was done at NRG. They moved to The Jungle Room in Burbank to finish the album.

The label wasn't happy with the way "I'm Shakin'" sounded. The band tried it different ways, but it just wasn't right. The band asked Iovine, who had agreed to produce two tracks, to produce the song. Iovine hired engineer Adam Kasper to run the session. They recorded at Village Studios in West Los Angeles. Tension was running high, and the session took over three weeks. Iovine felt the song came out great and approved Andy Wallace to mix the album. Wallace allegedly broke down in tears when he was asked.

The band hit the road with Weezer shortly after they finished recording. Then their friends The Strokes asked Rooney to open for them on their fall headline tour in 2002. At the end of the year, still no album out, they sold out a show at the Palace Theater (now the Avalon) in Hollywood. The band was frustrated that the album wasn't released, but the label assured them it would be out the summer of 2003. The band toured with The Donnas and OK Go, followed by a tour with Pete Yorn and Grandaddy. Finally the album was released May 20, 2003. The band hit the road on Lollapalooza 2003, its first year back as a national tour. The acts included The Namedroppers, Audioslave, Queens of the Stone Age, Jurassic 5, Incubus, The Donnas, Jane's Addiction, and Rooney (on the main stage).

"Blueside" was the lead-off single, which gained much play on alternative radio. The band was over the moon when they heard their song on their hometown radio station KROQ. The song was also featured in the video game Tiger Woods PGA Tour 2004.

Album sales were slow until in 2004, when they had a cameo appearance in an episode of The O.C., "The Third Wheel", where they sang the songs "Sorry Sorry", "I'm Shakin'", "Popstars", and "I'm a Terrible Person". The latter was used in the commercial of Carolina Herrera's fragrance CH, in 2007. "Blueside" was featured on the Tiger Woods PGA Tour 2004 soundtrack and "I'm Shakin'" was featured on an episode of the daytime soap opera All My Children.

On November 16, 2004, the band issued their first DVD, Spit & Sweat. The hour-long documentary features interviews with the band and live performances from Los Angeles. The DVD also includes the videos for "Blueside", "I'm Shakin'" and "If It Were Up to Me".

=== 2005–2008: Calling the World ===
Following their summer tour, the band began their third sessions for a second album. Only three songs from the previous sessions ("Don't Come Around Again," "Paralyzed," and "Tell Me Soon"), were kept for their new album, Calling the World. On March 6, 2007, the single "When Did Your Heart Go Missing?" was released on their official MySpace. The single also was used in commercials of the TV show Beauty and the Geek. It was also used in an episode of Newport Harbor: The Real Orange County, in the Gossip Girl season 1 episode "Wild Brunch" and in the movie Nancy Drew. The album was released to stores July 17, 2007 and debuted #42 on The Billboard Top 100 Albums chart.

Between the release of the first album and Calling the World, Rooney recorded, produced, and mastered two complete albums that were subsequently scrapped. Schwartzman has stated his desire to re-record these two albums for release in 2011.

Rooney headed out on a headlining tour dubbed "The Calling the World Tour" in May 2008 in the United States, which was scheduled to run through August. The band said during live shows that they planned to record a new album upon the completion of the tour.

=== 2009–2011: The Wild One and Eureka ===
Rooney worked on the theme for the show Iron Man: Armored Adventures on the Nicktoons network. The song premiered online on March 29, 2009, and the show launched on April 24, 2009.

Rooney became free agents, not attached to any record label. The new self-released EP Wild One was exclusively available only at live shows. The band started a winter tour with Tally Hall and Crash Kings on November 27, 2009, in Los Angeles. The tour went through most of December. The band streamed several songs from the album on MySpace days before the official first day of the tour. The EP was subsequently available for sale on Amazon's MP3 and Apple's iTunes stores.

Rooney's third full-length album was released on June 8, 2010, through California Dreamin' Records, Warner Music Group's Independent Label Group. The album features the lead single "I Can't Get Enough" and the final appearance of bassist Matthew Winter, who announced his departure from the band in February 2010. With new bassist Brandon Schwartzel, Rooney toured again nationally in Summer 2010 with bands The Young Veins and Black Gold supporting. "Holdin' On" was released as the second single in 2011.

=== 2016–present: New line up and Washed Away ===
In February 2016 Robert Schwartzman announced in a newsletter that the band is in the process of recording new material and will feature an entirely new line-up. They also released a new song for free download entitled "Come On Baby". Regarding the decision to continue with a new line-up, Schwartzman stated, "I met all the guys who played with Rooney for so many years in high school, and it was sort of like a high school relationship where you marry your high school sweetheart kind of thing, right out of school. And I think as you grow up, you realize, like, 'Who am I? What do I want?', and you start to connect with new people. And I started to meet all these other musicians that I had collaborated with, and it was over that hiatus that I kind of came back around to recording music that just felt like Rooney, kind of returning to this Rooney sound. I think everyone in the band for so long has been pursuing so many other things, that I think naturally it was time to make a change and shift to bring in new people."

On March 4, 2016, Schwartzman announced the new Rooney single, "My Heart Beats 4 U". The new album, titled Washed Away, was released on May 16. Schwartzman performed most of the instruments on the album, along with several session musicians including guitarist Taylor Johnson and drummer Joel Plotnik, both of whom have been among the rotating cast of players in the current live line-up of Rooney. Other musicians who have performed live in Rooney shows since the return from hiatus in early 2016 include Ben Messelbeck (bass), Phil Danyew (keyboards), Mike McKee (keyboards) and Brian Henspeter (drums).

== Members ==
=== Current ===
- Robert Schwartzman – lead vocals, rhythm guitar
- Boaz Roberts – lead guitar
- Sean Sobash – bass
- Maxwell Flanders – drums
- Matthew Jordan – keyboards

=== Former ===
- Teddy Briggs – drums
- Matthew Star (né Srolestar) – rhythm guitar
- Matthew Winter – bass, vocals
- Taylor Locke – lead guitar, vocals
- Ned Brower – drums, percussion, vocals
- Louie Stephens – keyboards, vocals
- Brandon Schwartzel – bass

== Discography ==
=== Albums ===
Title	Album details	Peak chart positions				
Title	Album details	US	US Heat	US Indie	FRA	GER
Rooney	Released: May 20, 2003; Label: Geffen	125	2	—	—	—
Calling the World	Released: July 17, 2007; Label: Geffen	42	—	—	155	94
Eureka	Released: June 8, 2010; Label: California Dreamin'	153	—	22	—	93
Washed Away	Released: May 6, 2016; Label: Beachwood Park	—	—	—	—	—
"—" denotes a release that did not chart.

=== EPs ===
Title	EP details
Wild One	Released: February 3, 2010; Label: Rooney Records
El Cortez	Released: July 28, 2017; Label: Rooney Records

=== Singles ===
Single	Year	Peak chart positions										Album
Single	Year	US Bub.	US Pop	AUT	CZR	GER	ITA	NLD	SCO	SWI	UK	Album
"If It Were Up To Me"	2002	—	—	—	—	—	—	—	—	—	—	Rooney
"Blueside"	2003	—	—	—	—	—	—	—	—	—	—	Rooney
"I'm Shakin'"	2004	—	— (Note: "I'm Shakin'" did not enter the Pop 100 but peaked on the Pop Airplay Chart at number 33.)	—	—	—	—	—	—	—	73	Rooney
"When Did Your Heart Go Missing?"	2007	14	82	22	5	17	29	27	42	57	45	Calling the World
"Are You Afraid?"	2007	—	—	—	—	59	—	— (Note: "Are You Afraid?" did not enter the Dutch Top 40 but peaked on the Dutch Tipparade Chart at number 16.)	—	— (Note: "Are You Afraid?" did not enter the Swiss Singles chart, but charted at number 86 on the Swiss Airplay chart.)	—	Calling the World
"Tell Me Soon"	2007	—	—	—	—	—	—	—	—	—	—	Calling the World
"I Should've Been After You"	2008	—	—	—	—	—	—	—	—	—	—	Calling the World
"I Can't Get Enough"	2010	—	—	61	—	47	—	—	—	—	—	Eureka
"Holdin' On"	2011	—	—	—	—	—	—	—	—	—	—	Eureka
"My Heart Beats 4 You"	2016	—	—	—	—	—	—	—	—	—	—	Washed Away
"Why" (featuring Soko)	2016	—	—	—	—	—	—	—	—	—	—	Washed Away
"Second Chances"	2017	—	—	—	—	—	—	—	—	—	—	El Cortez
"Maneater"	2018	—	—	—	—	—	—	—	—	—	—	Non-album single
"—" denotes a release that did not chart.

=== DVDs ===
- Spit & Sweat (2004)

=== Compilation appearances ===
- "Animal I Have Become" and "One-X", from the album One-X (Three Days Grace)
- "You Got It", from the album Roy Orbison Celebration (2009)
- "Metal Guru", from the album Herbie: Fully Loaded Soundtrack (2005)
- "Death on Two Legs", from the album Killer Queen: A Tribute to Queen (2005)
- "Here Today, Gone Tomorrow", from the album We're A Happy Family Ramones tribute (2003)
- "Merry X-Mas Everybody", from the album The Year They Recalled Santa Claus and The O.C. Mix 3: Have a Very Merry Chrismukkah
- "Sleep Song" featured in The Chumscrubber
- "I'm Shakin'" featured in Teachers 4: Top of the Class
- "I'm Shakin'" featured in The O.C. (S01E15)
- "When Did Your Heart Go Missing" featured in Nancy Drew (2007)
- "Blueside" featured in the Drake and Josh episode "Guitar" (S02E02)

=== Digital-only releases ===
- "When You Walk into the Room", released online only
- "Forever Young", released online only

== Music videos ==
Year	Title	Director
2003	"Blueside"	Marcos Siega
2004	"I'm Shakin'"	John Schwartzman
2004	"If It Were Up to Me"	?
2004	"Popstars"	Marcos Siega
2007	"When Did Your Heart Go Missing?"	Benny Boom
2007	"Tell Me Soon"	Roman Coppola
2007	"I Should've Been After You"	Brian Lazzaro
2008	"Are You Afraid?"	Brian Lazzaro
2009	Theme from Iron Man: Armored Adventures	Marco Schovolitz
2010	"I Can't Get Enough"	Marcus Herring
2011	"Holdin' On"	Marcus Herring
