= Nancy Drew (2007 film) =

2007 American mystery thriller film

- Theatrical release poster
- Directed by: Andrew Fleming
- Written by: Andrew Fleming; Tiffany Paulsen
- Based on: Nancy Drew by Edward Stratemeyer
- Produced by: Jerry Weintraub
- Starring: Emma Roberts; Josh Flitter; Max Thieriot; Rachael Leigh Cook; Tate Donovan
- Cinematography: Alexander Gruszynski
- Edited by: Jeff Freeman
- Music by: Ralph Sall
- Production companies: Virtual Studios; Jerry Weintraub Productions
- Distributed by: Warner Bros. Pictures
- Release date: June 15, 2007
- Running time: 99 minutes
- Country: United States
- Language: English
- Budget: $20 million
- Box office: $30.7 million

Nancy Drew is a 2007 American mystery comedy film loosely based on the series of mystery novels about the titular teen detective of the same name by Edward Stratemeyer. It stars Emma Roberts as Nancy Drew, with Josh Flitter and Max Thieriot. Directed by Andrew Fleming, the film follows Nancy Drew (Roberts) as she moves to Los Angeles with her father Carson (Tate Donovan) on an extended business trip and stumbles across evidence of an unsolved mystery involving the death of a murdered movie star, prompting Nancy to solve the cold case.

It was released in theaters on June 15, 2007, by Warner Bros. Pictures. The film received mixed reviews from critics and grossed $30 million worldwide on a $20 million budget.

== Plot ==
Nancy Drew, an amateur sleuth, and her widowed father, Carson Drew, move from their quaint hometown River Heights to California, where Carson has a temporary job. Carson encourages Nancy to focus on living like a normal teenager, instead of getting herself into trouble with crime-and mystery-solving. However, unbeknownst to Carson, Nancy chose their California house because of its famously unsolved mystery of the death of the movie star Dehlia Draycott. Nancy struggles to fit in at her new school, only befriending a younger boy, Corky. She wears 1950s outfits and penny loafers, becoming subject to teasing from Corky's older sister, Inga, and her best friend, Trish. After discovering many clues about the Draycott mystery, she begins secretly sleuthing behind her father's back. Nancy eventually finds Draycott's lost child, Jane Brighton, who turns out to be the sole beneficiary of Draycott's will, which has disappeared. Nancy contacts her father's business associate, Dashiel Biedermeyer, the lawyer for the Draycott estate, to assist her with the case.

Meanwhile, as an early birthday present, Ned Nickerson, Nancy's good friend with implied romantic interest, visits from River Heights. Corky becomes jealous of Nancy and Ned's close relationship and tries his best to get Nancy's attention. Nancy begins experiencing worsening attacks against her as she learns that someone does not want her to solve the case. One afternoon, a tearful Jane arrives on Nancy's doorstep and announces that her daughter has been taken away from her. While watching a Dehlia Draycott film, Nancy realizes that Draycott has hidden her will in a prop from one of her last movies. After retrieving the will, Nancy is kidnapped by the villain's henchmen. Nancy escapes with the will but gets into a car crash. Her father arrives and demands to know what is going on. After explaining her sleuthing, Biedermeyer offers them a ride home so he can finalize the legacy to Jane.

Nancy concludes that Biedermeyer was Dehlia Draycott's supposed love who stands to lose money if the will goes to Jane. However, when he questions Nancy about the will, she manages to jump out of the car. She is caught by Biedermeyer who threatens her; when Nancy asks him why he killed Dehlia, he replies that Dehlia went crazy after she put Jane up for adoption and wanted to leave to be with her caretaker Leshing, who is Jane's father. Nancy escapes but is once again cornered. Leshing arrives and knocks the henchmen unconscious as Nancy reveals that she secretly recorded Biedermeyer's confession. While the police arrive to arrest Biedermeyer, Nancy reveals to Leshing that Jane is his daughter. The will is restored to Jane, who is able to get her daughter back and convert the Draycott mansion into a home for single mothers.

Back at River Heights, Nancy visits Ned as he repairs her car and they share a kiss. She receives a long-distance phone call regarding a new mystery in Scotland.

== Cast ==
- Emma Roberts as Nancy Drew
- Josh Flitter as Corky Veinshtein
- Max Thieriot as Ned Nickerson
- Rachael Leigh Cook as Jane Brighton
- Tate Donovan as Carson Drew
- Marshall Bell as John Leshing
- Laura Harring as Dehlia Draycott
- Barry Bostwick as Dashiel Zachary Biedermeyer
- Daniella Monet as Inga Veinshtein
- Kelly Vitz as Trish
- Caroline Aaron as Barbara Barbara
- Adam Clark as Sgt. Billings
- Pat Carroll as the Elderly Neighbour
- Amy Bruckner as Bess Marvin
- Kay Panabaker as George Fayne
- Cliff Bemis as Chief McGinnis
- Kaitlyn Van Item as Allie

Several well-known actors make uncredited guest appearances in the film. Bruce Willis appears as himself, shooting a crime film in Los Angeles; Adam Goldberg plays Willis' director Andy; Chris Kattan plays one of the burglars Nancy catches in the opening sequence of the film; Lindsay Sloane plays a saleslady in a clothing boutique; Eddie Jemison appears as an adoption clerk; and Geraint Wyn Davies makes a brief appearance as a drama teacher. Ami and Yumi from Hi Hi Puffy AmiYumi also make a brief appearance as the show plays on TV.

== Production ==
The film was shot in Los Angeles from January 30, 2006, to April 3, 2006. At that time, Emma Roberts did not have her driver's license. Though she was in possession of a permit, by law she was unable to drive the roadster for the car chase scenes all by herself. The movie was filmed in several California cities, including South Pasadena, Los Angeles, Santa Clarita, Long Beach, La Canada Flintridge and Burbank.

Before Roberts was cast, actress Amanda Bynes was considered to portray Nancy, but her schedule prevented her from taking the role. Skye Sweetnam also auditioned for the role.

Nancy's car in the film is a blue Nash Metropolitan convertible.

== Home media ==
Nancy Drew was released on DVD on March 11, 2008.

=== American TV rights ===
American cable networks, such as ABC Family and the Disney Channel, acquired the rights to the 2007 film version of Nancy Drew.

== Reception ==
=== Box office ===
Opening at #7 in the U.S. box office, the film grossed $6,832,318 on its opening weekend and has since grossed $25,612,520 in the US and $5,054,410 internationally for a total of $30,666,930 worldwide.

=== Critical response ===
On Rotten Tomatoes the film has an approval rating of 50% from 137 critics, with the site's consensuses reading, "Emma Roberts is bubbly and charming as Nancy Drew, the junior detective. But despite her best efforts, Nancy Drew still lacks excitement, surprise, and compelling secondary characters." On Metacritic, the film has a score of 53 out of 100, based on reviews from 31 critics, indicating "mixed or average reviews". Audiences polled by CinemaScore gave the film an average grade of "A−" on an A+ to F scale.

Sheri Linden of The Hollywood Reporter wrote: "The culture-clash procedural, which brings the small-town teen to big bad Hollywood, feels more perfunctory than inspired." Lael Loewenstein of Variety magazine, said the film "serves up stale mystery-movie cliches and overcooked red herrings in a thoroughly wooden adaptation" and "the cast is as stiff as the dialogue".

Plugged In said that "the film has all of the oversimplifications of a teen mystery novel with a little—but not enough—humorous self-awareness tossed in to make the story satisfying for adults".

== Book adaptations ==
A novelization of the movie was written by Daniela Burr the year of the film's release and published by Simon Spotlight. Plus, books in the Nancy Drew, Girl Detective and Nancy Drew Clue Crew series both had movie-themed books.

== Soundtrack ==
1. "Come to California" (Matthew Sweet)
2. "Perfect Misfit" (Liz Phair)
3. "Kids in America" (The Donnas)
4. "Pretty Much Amazing" (Joanna)
5. "Looking for Clues" (Katie Melua)
6. "Hey Nancy Drew" (Price)
7. "Like a Star" (Corinne Bailey Rae)
8. "Nice Day" (Persephone's Bees)
9. "Blue Monday" (Flunk)
10. "We Came to Party" (J-Kwon)
11. "All I Need" (Cupid)
12. "Party Tonight" (Bizarre)
13. "When Did Your Heart Go Missing?" (Rooney)
14. "DARE" (Gorillaz featuring Shaun Ryder)

== Awards ==
Nominated

- Nickelodeon Australian Kids' Choice Awards
- 2008 – Favorite Movie Star for Emma Roberts
- 2007 – Favorite Movie
- Teen Choice Awards
- 2007 – Choice Movie Actress: Comedy for Emma Roberts
- 2007 – Choice Movie: Breakout Female for Emma Roberts
- Young Artist Awards
- 2007 – Best Family Feature Film (Comedy or Drama)
- 2007 – Best Performance in a Feature Film – Leading Young Actress for Emma Roberts
- 2007 – Best Performance in a Feature Film – Young Ensemble Cast for Emma Roberts, Josh Flitter, Amy Bruckner and Kay Panabaker
