= Blood Fest =

- Directed by: Owen Egerton
- Screenplay by: Owen Egerton
- Produced by: Seth Caplan; Will Hyde; Ezra Venetos
- Starring: Robbie Kay; Jacob Batalon; Seychelle Gabriel; Barbara Dunkelman; Nick Rutherford; Tate Donovan
- Cinematography: David Blue Garcia
- Edited by: Dan Hirons
- Music by: Chøppersaurus
- Production company: Rooster Teeth
- Distributed by: Cinedigm
- Release dates: March 9, 2018 (SXSW); August 31, 2018 (Digital Download)
- Running time: 92 minutes
- Country: United States
- Language: English

Blood Fest is a 2018 American comedy horror film written and directed by Owen Egerton and starring Robbie Kay, Seychelle Gabriel, and Jacob Batalon. Other cast members include Barbara Dunkelman, Nick Rutherford, and Tate Donovan, with a cameo by Zachary Levi. The film was released on Rooster Teeth's video on demand service and had its world premiere at the SXSW Film Festival in 2018.

== Plot ==
On Halloween, Dax Conway watches horror films with his mother. When she goes to the kitchen, a man in a red mask murders her. Dax's father, renowned psychologist Dr. Vaughn Conway, fatally shoots the man, his former patient.

Years later, Dax develops an obsession with horror films as coping mechanism for his trauma. He prepares to attend Blood Fest, a horror film festival held on a massive, enclosed ranch. Discovering Dax's tickets and event wristband, Dr. Conway destroys them and forbids Dax from attending. Dax obtains an extra ticket from his acquaintances Ashley and Lenjamin.

Arriving with his best friends Sam and Krill, Dax meets his idol Roger Hinckley, but his enthusiasm is cut short when Hinckley coldly dismisses Dax and his own films.

The event's founder Anthony Walsh greets the audience and invites everyone to help him make "the ultimate horror film." A large group of chainsaw wielding assailants descends upon the audience and begins killing them. Dax, Sam, and Krill flee further into the venue. Walsh enters his control tower and watches the carnage being captured from multiple angles.

Dax, Sam, and Krill meet Ashley and Lenjamin, the group then heads to the warehouse, where Ashley has a passkey for the door. At a graveyard set, after Ashley gives Lenjamin the passkey, zombies crawl out of the ground and kill him. The others run to a nearby cabin, where Hinckley is hiding. Dax kills a zombie and discovers it is a real corpse, re-animated and controlled by electrical signals. Dax and Sam destroy a power box, cutting off the signal, letting them escape.

The group, joined by Hinckley, come upon the "Arbor Day" set recreation. The Arborist, the series' villain, pursues them. Krill, separated from the group, is captured by vampires, but the lead vampire Rain spares him for being a virgin. Krill obtains a flaming stake and uses it to kill the Arborist.

Traveling through what they thought was the maintenance tunnels, the group stumble upon Tortureville, a torture porn-themed set. Sam gets stuck in a trap, but Hinckley sacrifices himself to save her. Ashley and Krill get stuck in a bathroom and, after Ashley tearfully admits losing the passkey, they have sex. The four discovers explosive barrels and realize the place is rigged to explode. At an interview, Dr. Conway realizes Dax is missing and leaves.

The four make it to Clowntown. Just before the murderous clowns attack, the zombies, no longer affected by the signal confining them to their zone, rush in and fight the clowns. Spotting a zombified Lenjamin, Ashley retrieves the passkey and throws it to Krill, but is killed in the process. Dax, Sam, and Krill make it to the warehouse. Rain suddenly appears and rips Krill's throat out, realizing he is no longer a virgin. Sam kills Rain, but Krill dies from his injury.

As Red appears and holds a knife to Sam's throat, Dr. Conway enters through the exit door. Red is revealed to be Dax's younger sister, Jayme, and Dr. Conway is Walsh's partner. Blaming horror films for his wife's death, he decided to turning Blood Fest into a massacre. His aim is both to punish horror films aficionados, and hopefully to use the shock to put an end to the horror genre. Telling Sam and Dax to escape, Dr. Conway and Jayme leave to join Walsh. However, one of Walsh's workers notices Dax and Sam on a monitor locks the exit. Dax and Sam take a truck from the warehouse and drive to the control tower.

With over two hundred festival-goers alive, Walsh activates the wristbands to emit a pulse causing the wearers to go insane. Sam attacks Dax, causing the truck to crash into the tower. Seeing Dax on the monitor, Dr. Conway activates the tower's elevator to help Dax escape. Dax confronts his father and sister. Dr. Conway shoots Walsh and claims he is doing the right thing. Dax reveals that he fears his own father, having seen him killing. Dr. Conway activates the timed explosives. Having a change of heart, Jayme throws a knife at Dr. Conway's chest, sending him out of a window to his death.

Sam bursts into the room, but returns to normal after Dax breaks off her wristband. The two admit their feelings each other and share a passionate kiss. Jayme apologizes for helping Dr. Conway before escaping out the window. After Dax and Sam make their way out, the explosives go off and destroys the venue.

In a post-credits scene, a hand breaks out of the ruins, clutching Walsh's staff.

== Cast ==
- Robbie Kay as Dax Conway
  - Tristan Riggs as young Dax
- Jacob Batalon as Krill
- Seychelle Gabriel as Sam
- Barbara Dunkelman as Ashley
- Chris Doubek as Roger Hinckley
- Nick Rutherford as Lenjamin Cain
- Tate Donovan as Dr. Vaughn Conway
- Owen Egerton as Anthony Walsh
- Rebecca Wagner as Jayme / Red
- Byron Brown as Mac
- Olivia Grace Applegate as Rain The Vampire
- Christina Parrish as Amy
- Adam Ellis as The Arborist
- Paul Ogola as Billy
- Samantha Ireland as Mrs. Conway
- Geoff Ramsey as Guns
- Zachary Levi as himself
- Gavin Free as himself
- Will Hyde as Masked Killer – Prologue

== Release ==
After Cinedigm acquired distribution rights, the film had a one night theatrical screening on August 14, 2018, exclusively through Fathom Events. The film was released onto Digital platforms on August 31, 2018, before onto Blu-ray and DVD on October 2, 2018. The digital release also includes footage featuring Gus Sorola that was cut from the film as a short film titled Gus Fest.

On August 30, 2018, Rooster Teeth released "Mr. Leadfeet", a short film featuring the character of Mr. Leadfeet from Blood Fest.

The film became available to paid members of Rooster Teeth's website on February 14, 2019.

== Reception ==
The review aggregator website Rotten Tomatoes reported a 50% approval rating based on 20 reviews. Metacritic, which uses a weighted average, assigned the film a score of 54 out of 100, based on 5 critics, indicating "mixed or average" reviews.

In a mixed review, Frank Scheck of The Hollywood Reporter criticized the film's humor, stating, "There are some fun moments... But the humor more often comes across as forced." He mainly criticized the film compared to others in the same horror-parody genre, stating, "none of the meta-styled proceedings is particularly original" and that "Genre aficionados might enjoy the film to a certain degree... But that familiarity is a double-edged sword, since buffs are also more likely to get the feeling that they've seen this type of thing far too many times."
