= Transpecos (film) =

- Theatrical release poster
- Directed by: Greg Kwedar
- Written by: Greg Kwedar; Clint Bentley
- Produced by: Molly Benson; Greg Kwedar; Clint Bentley; Nancy Schafer
- Starring: Johnny Simmons; Gabriel Luna; Clifton Collins Jr.
- Cinematography: Jeffrey Waldron
- Edited by: Alan Canant
- Music by: Aaron Dessner; Bryce Dessner
- Production companies: 8750 Films; Marfa Peach Company
- Distributed by: Samuel Goldwyn Films
- Release dates: March 13, 2016 (SXSW); September 9, 2016 (United States)
- Running time: 86 minutes
- Country: United States
- Languages: English; Spanish

Transpecos is a 2016 American thriller film directed by Greg Kwedar, and written by Kwedar and Clint Bentley. The film stars Johnny Simmons, Gabriel Luna, and Clifton Collins Jr. as border patrol agents who encounter a Mexican drug cartel. The film premiered at South by Southwest on March 13, 2016. The film was released on September 9, 2016, in a limited release and through video on demand by Samuel Goldwyn Films.

== Plot ==
Three agents (Benjamin Davis, Lance Flores, and Lou Hobbs) find some drug evidence in a car at a desert checkpoint, which reveals an insidious plot in their organisation. They set out to uncover the truth by putting their life on the line.

== Cast ==
- Johnny Simmons as Benjamin Davis
- Gabriel Luna as Lance Flores
- Clifton Collins Jr. as Lou Hobbs
- Will Brittain as Agent Hendricks
- Alma Martinez as Marisa
- David Acord as Dispatch 700
- Oscar Avila as Mexican Leader
- Alex Knight as Man in Car
- Jake Lockett as Agent Jaeger
- Lora Martinez-Cunningham as Agent Lupo
- Robert Douglas Washington as Young Agent
- Sam Adler as Family Man
- Ralph Alderman as Chief Carter
- Clint Bentley as Agent Mike Billings
- Caroline Derpienski as Caroline
- Cesar Lopez as Boy in Road
- Jesus Mayorga as Jiminez

== Release ==
Transpecos received its world premiere at South by Southwest in Austin, Texas on March 13, 2016. Shortly after, Samuel Goldwyn Films acquired U.S distribution rights to the film, with a planned fall release.

== Reception ==
The film was met with positive reviews from critics. John DeFore of The Hollywood Reporter wrote: "Artfully made but wholly accessible for a mainstream audience, it features strong performances but no names in the cast who'll draw attention on their own." DeFore went on to single out the performance of Gabriel Luna, writing: "While all three performances are on target, the film belongs to Luna, as Flores scrambles to mislead the bosses he wants to alert until he and Davis can somehow fix this botched smuggling run." Kahron Spearman of The Austin Chronicle wrote: "With nail-biting precision, Kwedar has crafted Transpecos into a diamond."
