= Gabriel Luna =

American actor (born 1982)

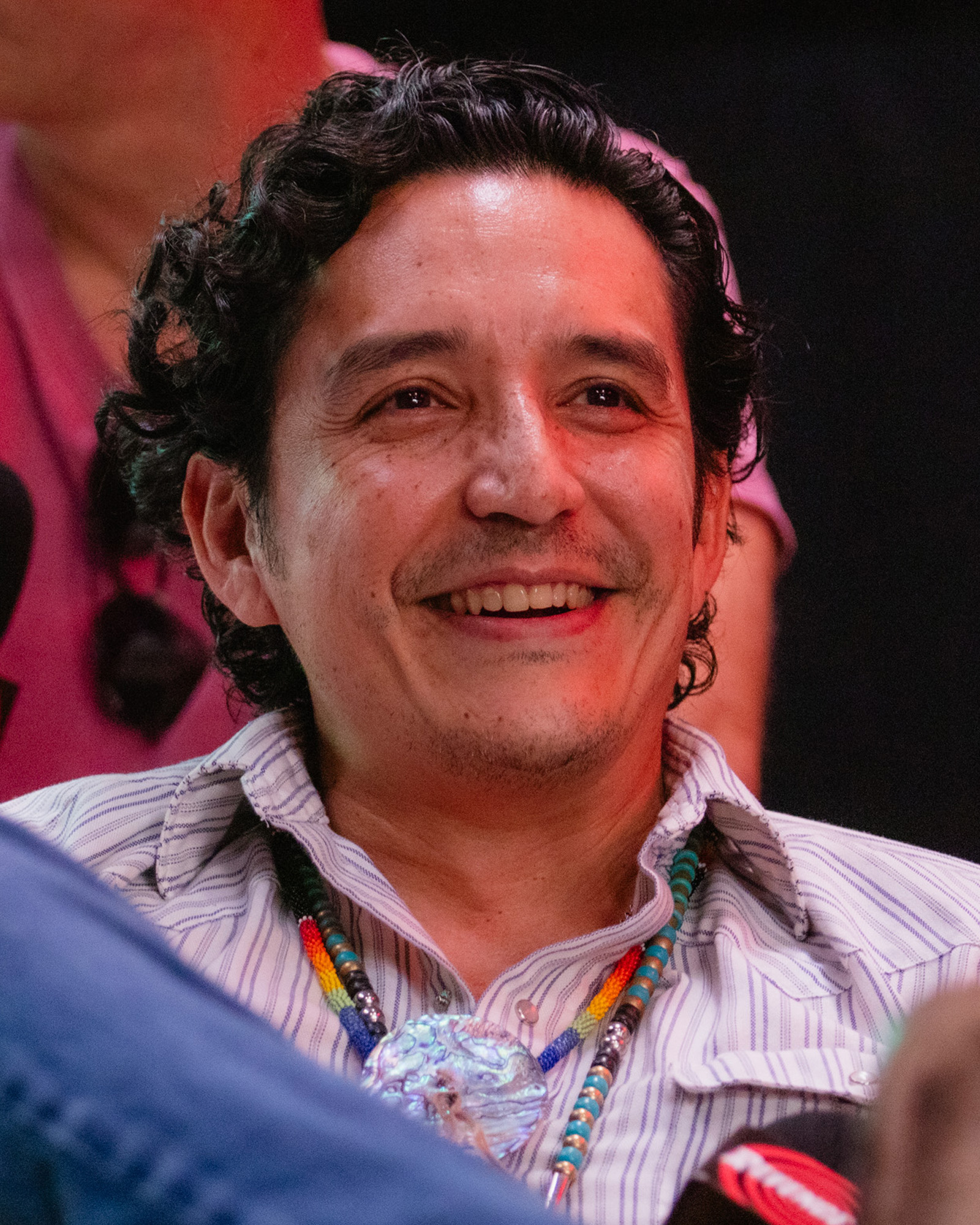
- Luna in 2025
- Born: Gabriel Isaac Luna; December 5, 1982 (age 43); Austin, Texas, U.S.
- Education: St. Edward's University (BFA)
- Occupations: Actor; producer
- Years active: 2005–present
- Spouse: Smaranda Ciceu (m. 2011)

Gabriel Isaac Luna (born December 5, 1982) is an American actor and producer. He is known for his roles as Robbie Reyes / Ghost Rider on the ABC superhero series Agents of S.H.I.E.L.D. (2016–2017), Tony Bravo on the El Rey Network drama series Matador (2014), Paco Contreras on the ABC crime drama series Wicked City (2015), Rev-9 in the Terminator film Terminator: Dark Fate (2019), and Tommy Miller in the HBO post-apocalyptic drama series The Last of Us (2023–present). He has also starred in the films Bernie (2011), Balls Out (2014), Freeheld (2015), Gravy (2015), and Transpecos (2016).

== Early life ==
Gabriel Isaac Luna was born in Austin, Texas. His father died prior to Luna's birth, and he was raised by his mother. He attended St. Edward's University in Austin, where he made his stage debut as Romeo in a production of Romeo and Juliet, and graduated in 2005.

== Career ==
Luna made his screen acting debut as Kristofer Rostropovich in the drama film Fall to Grace, which premiered at South by Southwest in March 2005. He then provided voice-over work for the science fiction video game BlackSite: Area 51, which was released in November 2007. Luna is a founding member of the Austin-based Paper Chairs Theatre Company. On stage in Austin, Luna has portrayed Sergei Maxudov in Black Snow (2009), the title character in Orestes (2009), and Clov in Endgame (2010). For these three performances, he received the Austin Critics Table Best Lead Actor Award in 2010.

Luna then starred as the lead character, Nate Hitchins, in the drama film Dance with the One, which premiered at South by Southwest in March 2010. The following year, he had a supporting role in the black comedy film Bernie, directed by Richard Linklater, which premiered at the Los Angeles Film Festival in June 2011. Luna's television credits include minor roles on Fox's serial drama Prison Break (2008), HBO's television film Temple Grandin (2010), Fox's drama-thriller Touch (2013), and CBS' action procedural drama NCIS: Los Angeles (2013).

In 2014, he was cast in the leading role of Tony Bravo on the El Rey Network television series Matador. The series premiered in July 2014 and ran for one season of 13 episodes, ending that October. That same year, he co-starred as Vinnie in the sports comedy Balls Out, which premiered at the Tribeca Film Festival in April 2014. Luna next recurred as Miguel Gilb, a former lover of Taylor Kitsch's character, on the second season of the HBO anthology drama series True Detective, appearing in 3 episodes. He then co-starred in the Julianne Moore and Elliot Page-led drama film Freeheld, directed by Peter Sollett, which premiered at the Toronto International Film Festival in September 2015.

Luna subsequently had a supporting role in the comedy film Gravy, directed by James Roday, which was released in October 2015. He was then cast as Paco Contreras, a detective searching for a serial killer on the Sunset Strip, on the ABC crime drama series Wicked City. The series premiered in October 2015, but was cancelled following its third episode; the remaining episodes were later released through Hulu.

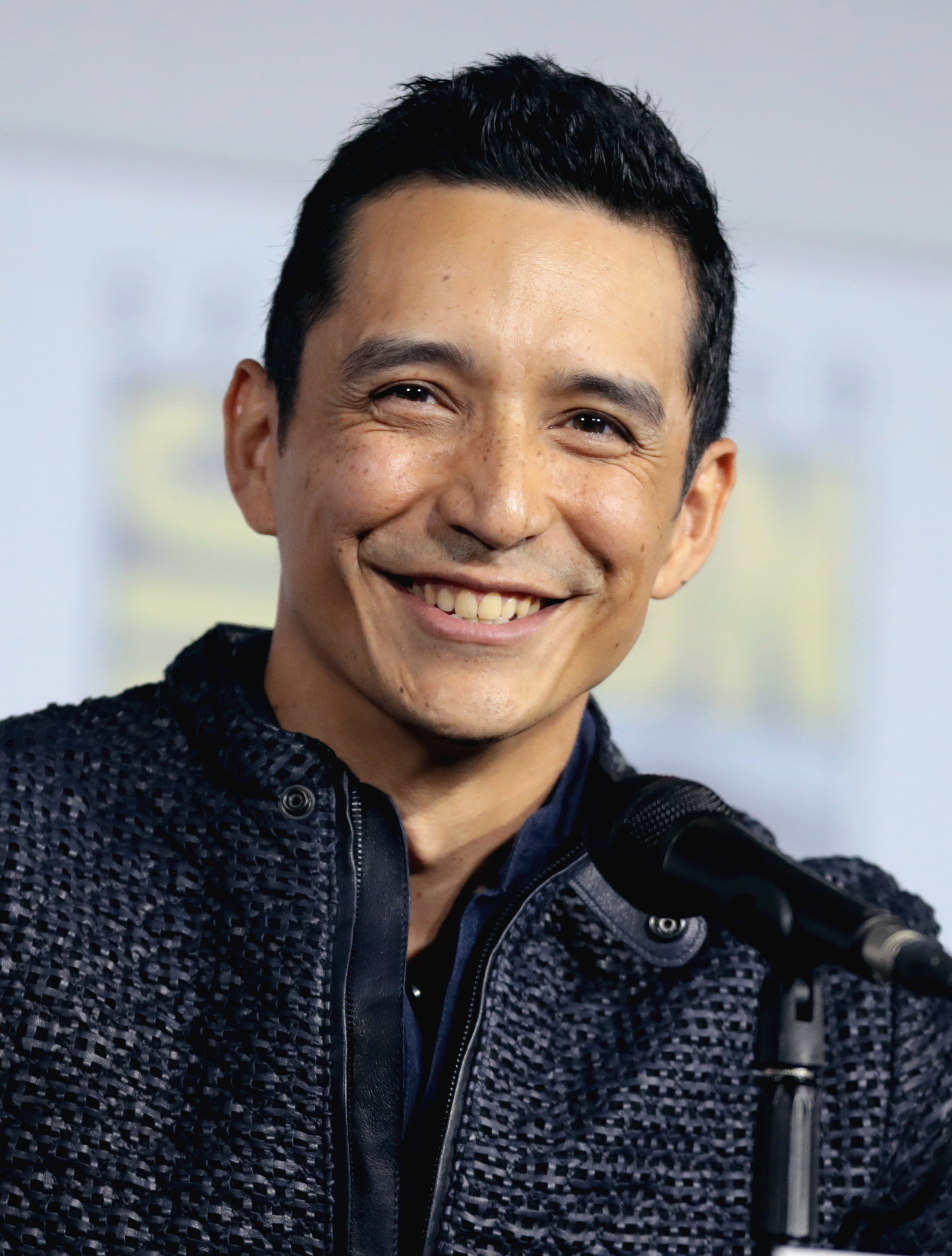
Luna in 2019

The following year, he starred as border patrol agent Lance Flores in the thriller film Transpecos, opposite Clifton Collins, Jr. and Johnny Simmons. The film had its premiere at South by Southwest in March 2016. Luna next appeared as motorcycle racer Eddie Hasha in the Discovery Channel miniseries Harley and the Davidsons. In July of the same year, it was announced that he would join the cast of Agents of S.H.I.E.L.D. in season 4 as Robbie Reyes / Ghost Rider. He was nominated for Choice TV: Action Actor at the 2017 Teen Choice Awards for his role as Ghost Rider. Luna has a supporting role as Mr. Lawrence in the coming-of-age film Hala, alongside Jack Kilmer and Anna Chlumsky. In April 2018, he was cast as the villainous Rev-9 Terminator in Terminator: Dark Fate.

In 2019, it was announced that Luna would be reprising his role of Robbie Reyes / Ghost Rider from Agents of S.H.I.E.L.D. in a television series centred on the character which will be released on Hulu to debut in 2020. On September 25, it was reported that Hulu had decided not to go forward on the series.

In April 2021, it was announced that Luna would play Tommy Miller in the HBO television adaptation of The Last of Us opposite Pedro Pascal. In March 2025, he was cast as Freddy Strain in the second season of the Amazon Prime Video series The Terminal List. In July 2026, Luna was cast in a guest role as Ray Ballard / the Sleepy-Eyed Stranger in the Dexter sequel series Dexter: Resurrection.

== Personal life ==
Luna married Romanian actress Smaranda Ciceu on February 20, 2011. They reside in Los Angeles.

== Filmography ==
=== Film ===
Key
†	Denotes films that have not yet been released

Year	Title	Role	Notes
2005	Fall to Grace	Kristofer Rostropovich	Debut role
2010	Dance with the One	Nate Hitchins	
2011	Bernie	Kevin	Uncredited
2012	Spring Eddy	Eddy	
2014	Balls Out	Vinnie	
2015	Freeheld	Detective Quesada	
2015	Gravy	Hector	
2016	Transpecos	Lance Flores	
2019	Hala	Mr. Lawrence	
2019	Terminator: Dark Fate	Rev-9	
2025	The Astronaut	Mark	
2026	Baton †	TBA	Post-production

=== Television ===
Key
†	Denotes television productions that have not yet been released

Year	Title	Role	Notes
2008	Prison Break	Eduardo	Episode: "Dirt Nap"
2010	Temple Grandin	Student Wit	Television film; uncredited
2013	Touch	Ted	Episode: "Ghosts"
2013	NCIS: Los Angeles	Geology Student	Episode: "Descent"
2014	Matador	Tony Bravo	13 episodes
2015	True Detective	Miguel Gilb	3 episodes
2015	Wicked City	Paco Contreras	8 episodes
2016	Harley and the Davidsons	Eddie Hasha	Episode: "Amazing Machine"
2016	Rosewood	Eddie Lunez	Episode: "Eddie & the Empire State of Mind"
2016–2017	Agents of S.H.I.E.L.D.	Robbie Reyes / Ghost Rider	10 episodes (cameo appearance in episode 21)
2017	Patti and Marina	Guy with Guitar	Episode: "Dating"
2022	Love, Death & Robots	Sergeant Nielsen (voice)	Episode: "Kill Team Kill"
2023–present	The Last of Us	Tommy Miller	Guest (season 1); Main role (seasons 2–3)
2023	FUBAR	Boro	Main role; 8 episodes
2024	Secret Level	King Zimah (voice)	Episode: "New World: The Once and Future King"
2025	Devil in Disguise: John Wayne Gacy	Det. Rafael Tovar	8 episodes
2026	The Terminal List	Freddy Strain	Recurring role (season 2)
2026	Dexter: Resurrection	Ray Ballard / The Sleepy-Eyed Stranger	Guest (season 2); 2 episodes

=== Stage ===
Year	Title	Role	Location
2009	Black Snow	Sergei Maxudov	Salvage Vanguard Theater
2009	Orestes	Orestes	The Off Center
2010	Endgame	Clov	Larry L. King Theatre
2026	Spectacular	Bono / Norman Osborn / Green Goblin	Hayworth Theatre

=== Video game ===
Year	Title	Voice role	Notes
2007	BlackSite: Area 51	Additional voices	

== Awards and nominations ==
Year	Award	Category	Nominated work	Result	Refs
2010	Austin Critics Table Awards	Best Lead Actor	Black Snow / Orestes / Endgame	Won	
2016	Nashville Film Festival	Special Jury Award for Best Actor	Transpecos	Won	
2017	Teen Choice Awards	Choice TV: Action Actor	Marvel's Agents of S.H.I.E.L.D.	Nominated	
2023	Annual Imagen Awards	Best Supporting Actor - Drama (Television)	The Last of Us	Nominated	
