= My Ambition =

- Directed by: Keith Dinielli
- Written by: Keith Dinielli
- Based on: "Blood Son" by Richard Matheson
- Produced by: Robert Myrtle
- Starring: Johnny Simmons; Bernard Zilinskas; Brooke Morgan
- Cinematography: Scott Winig
- Edited by: David Chechel
- Production company: k2 Productions
- Release date: May 14, 2006 (Director's Cut Film Festival)
- Running time: 8 minutes
- Country: United States
- Language: English
- Budget: $25,000 (estimated)

My Ambition is a 2006 American horror short film written and directed by Keith Dinielli, based on the 1951 Richard Matheson short story "Blood Son".

== Plot ==
A young man, Jules Walters, gets kicked out of school because he has an unhealthy obsession with vampires. While spending time at a local zoo, Jules manages to steal a bat and sneak it away to an old shack by the railyards. It is there that Jules' obsession with vampires will lead to his demise.

== Cast ==
- Johnny Simmons as Jules Walters
- Bernard Zilinskas as Zookeeper
- Brooke Morgan as Teacher
- Jonas Barnes as The Count
