= Kelly LeBrock =

American actress and model (born 1960)

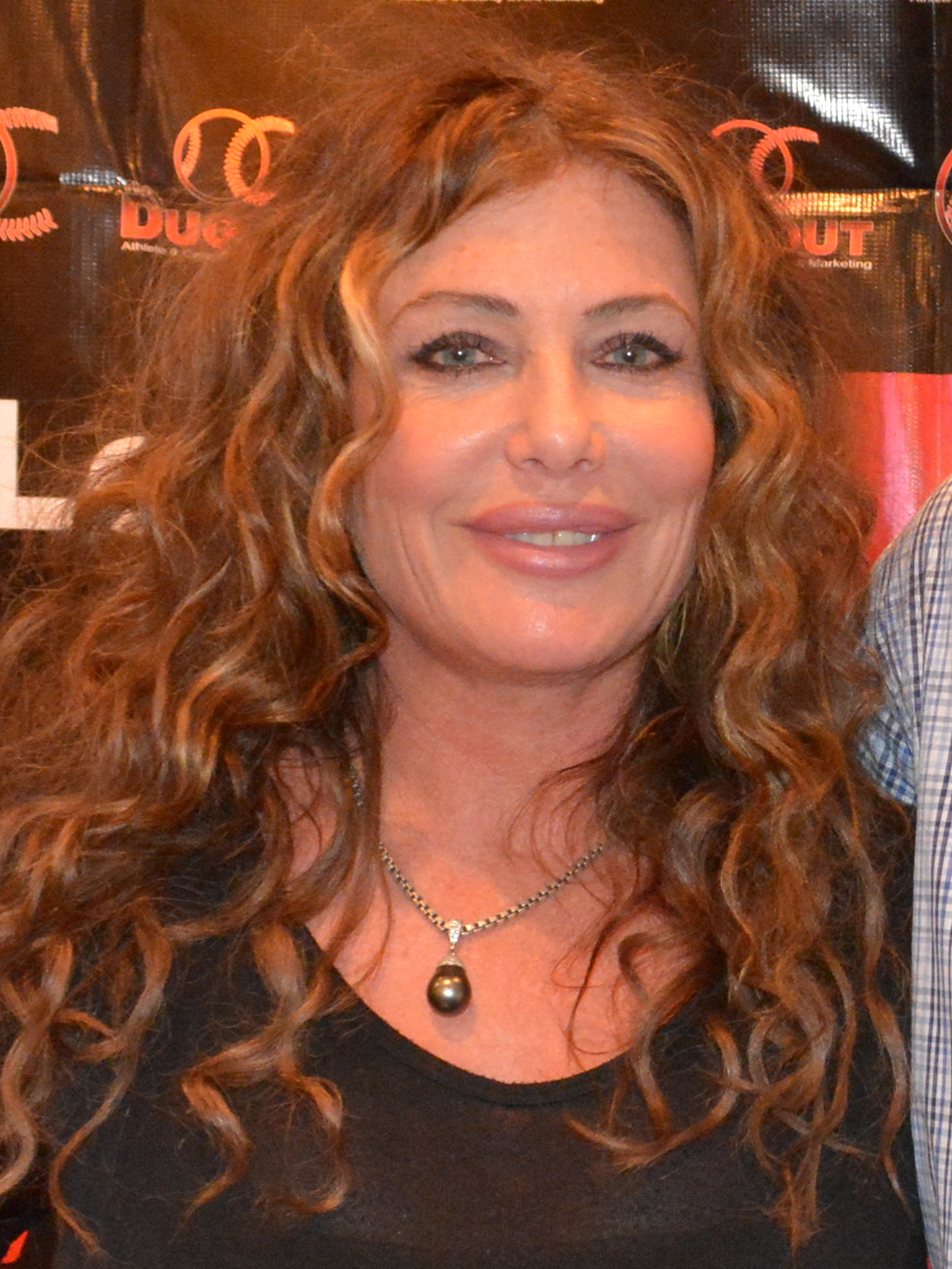
- LeBrock at the Chiller Theatre Expo in 2014
- Born: March 24, 1960 (age 66); New York City, U.S.
- Occupations: Actress; supermodel
- Years active: 1976–present
- Known for: Weird Science; The Woman in Red
- Spouses: Victor Drai (m. 1984; div. 1986); Steven Seagal (m. 1987; div. 1996); Fred Steck (m. 2007; div. 2008)
- Children: 3

Kelly LeBrock (born March 24, 1960) is an American actress and model. Her acting debut was in The Woman in Red (1984), alongside Gene Wilder. She also starred in the John Hughes film Weird Science (1985), and in Hard to Kill (1990), opposite her then-husband Steven Seagal.

== Early life ==
Kelly LeBrock was born in New York City, and was brought up in the Kensington area of London. Her father was French-Canadian, and her mother, Maria, is of Irish descent. LeBrock was named after her grandmother, Mary Helen Kelly, from Keady, County Armagh.

== Career ==
=== Modelling ===
LeBrock began her career as a model at age 16 in her birth city of New York. Her breakthrough came at 19, when she starred in a 24-page spread in Vogue magazine. Shortly afterwards, she entered into a contract with Christian Dior to work for that fashion label for 30 days a year. She subsequently appeared on numerous magazine covers and in fashion spreads, and became one of Eileen Ford's most sought-after models. She became especially recognisable as the Pantene shampoo commercial spokeswoman whose line, "Don't hate me because I'm beautiful", became a pop culture catchphrase.

=== Film ===
LeBrock was cast as the "perfect" or "fantasy" woman in the films The Woman in Red (1984) and Weird Science (1985). As a result, she was considered one of the sexiest women in Hollywood in the 1980s, and was in high demand, but took a hiatus from acting until 1990. Her return to the big screen started in 1990 when she starred opposite her then-husband, Steven Seagal, in Hard to Kill. LeBrock also appeared in Betrayal of the Dove (1993), Tracks of a Killer (1995) and Hard Bounty (1995).

She had roles in the films Wrongfully Accused (1998), The Sorcerer's Apprentice (2001), Zerophilia (2005) and Gamers: The Movie (2006). LeBrock was in a thriller entitled Hidden Affairs, released in 2013, and in 2015 she appeared in A Prince for Christmas as Queen Ariana.

=== Television ===
In 2005, LeBrock was the captain of the team "Kelly's Bellies" on VH1's Celebrity Fit Club reality show. She also appeared on the third UK series of Hell's Kitchen. She and her daughter Arissa were featured on the Lifetime docuseries Growing Up Supermodel which debuted in August 2017.

=== In popular culture ===
British band Bastille released the song "Good Grief" in 2016, which samples two of LeBrock's lines from Weird Science: "So what would you little maniacs like to do first?" and "If you want to be a party animal, you have to learn to live in the jungle. Now stop worrying and go and get dressed."

== Personal life ==
I'm more for my family. My family's going to be around when the movies aren't. If I don't build my family, I'm going to be a lonely 'hot' movie star, and I don't want that.

— Kelly LeBrock, 1989 Orange Coast magazine profile

Her first marriage was to film producer and restaurateur Victor Drai, in 1984; they divorced in 1986. During this time she met actor and martial artist Steven Seagal. Their daughter Annaliza was born in spring 1987 and the couple married in September of that year. Their son Dominic was born in June 1990 and their daughter Arissa in 1993. The following year, LeBrock filed for divorce.

In July 2007, LeBrock married retired investment banker Fred Steck; they divorced the following year. By 2011, LeBrock lived on a ranch in California's Santa Ynez Valley. After the death of her brother Harold in 2008, LeBrock began devoting time to the terminally ill. She has been a spokeswoman for Club Carson, a foundation for children suffering from cancer.

== Filmography ==
- 1984: The Woman in Red as Charlotte
- 1985: Weird Science as Lisa
- 1990: Hard to Kill as Andrea "Andy" Stewart
- 1993: Betrayal of the Dove as Una
- 1993: David Copperfield (TV) as Clara (voice)
- 1995: Tracks of a Killer as Claire Hawkner
- 1995: Hard Bounty as Donnie
- 1998: Wrongfully Accused as Lauren Goodhue
- 2001: The Sorcerer's Apprentice as Morgana
- 2005: Zerophilia as woman in RV
- 2006: Gamers: The Movie as Angela's Mom
- 2007: The Mirror as Mary Theophilu
- 2009: Prep School as Miss Waters
- 2015: 10 Days in a Madhouse as Miss Grant
- 2015: A Prince for Christmas as Queen Ariana
- 2019: Charlie Boy as Donna
