= The Unicorn (2018 film) =

- Theatrical release poster
- Directed by: Robert Schwartzman
- Screenplay by: Nick Rutherford; Kirk C. Johnson; Will Elliott
- Story by: Robert Schwartzman
- Produced by: Russell Wayne Groves; Robert Schwartzman
- Starring: Lauren Lapkus; Nick Rutherford; Lucy Hale; Beck Bennett; Dree Hemingway; Darrell Britt-Gibson; Maya Kazan; John Kapelos; Beverly D'Angelo; Kyle Mooney
- Cinematography: Michael Rizzi; John Schwartzman
- Edited by: Chris Donlon
- Production company: Beachwood Park Films
- Distributed by: The Orchard
- Release dates: March 10, 2018 (SXSW); February 1, 2019 (United States)
- Running time: 88 minutes
- Country: United States
- Language: English

The Unicorn is a 2018 American comedy film directed by Robert Schwartzman and starring Lauren Lapkus, Nick Rutherford, Lucy Hale, Beck Bennett, Dree Hemingway, Darrell Britt-Gibson, Maya Kazan, John Kapelos, Beverly D'Angelo, and Kyle Mooney. Its screenplay was written by Nick Rutherford, Kirk C. Johnson, and Will Elliott, from a story by Schwartzman.

It had its world premiere at South by Southwest on March 10, 2018 and was released on February 1, 2019, by The Orchard.

== Premise ==
An engaged couple look to reenergize their relationship by having a threesome.

== Cast ==
- Lauren Lapkus as Malory
- Nick Rutherford as Caleb
- Lucy Hale as Jesse
- Beck Bennett as Tyson
- Dree Hemingway as April
- Darrell Britt-Gibson as Charlie
- Maya Kazan as Katie
- John Kapelos as Louis
- Beverly D'Angelo as Edie
- Kyle Mooney as Gabe
- Brittany Furlan as Samantha
- Jeff Grace as Bartender
- Elizabeth Ruscio as Aunt Becky

== Production ==
In July 2017, it was announced Lauren Lapkus, Nick Rutherford, Lucy Hale, Beck Bennett, Dree Hemingway, Darrell Britt-Gibson, Maya Kazan, John Kapelos, and Beverly D'Angelo had been cast in the film, with Rutherford writing the script alongside Kirk C. Johnson and Will Elliott, from a story by Robert Schwartzman who would also direct the film. Schwartzman would serve as a producer on the film alongside Russell Wayne Groves, while Bret Disend, Al Di, Mark Weiss, Jessica James, and Bo An would serve as executive producers.

== Release ==
The film had its world premiere at South by Southwest on March 10, 2018. Shortly after, Screen Media Films acquired North American distribution rights to the film; however, these rights would later be transferred to The Orchard in September 2018. It was released on February 1, 2019.

== Reception ==
On review aggregator website Rotten Tomatoes, the film holds an approval rating of 91% based on 11 reviews and an average score of 7.5/10.
