= Beverly D'Angelo =

American actress (born 1951)

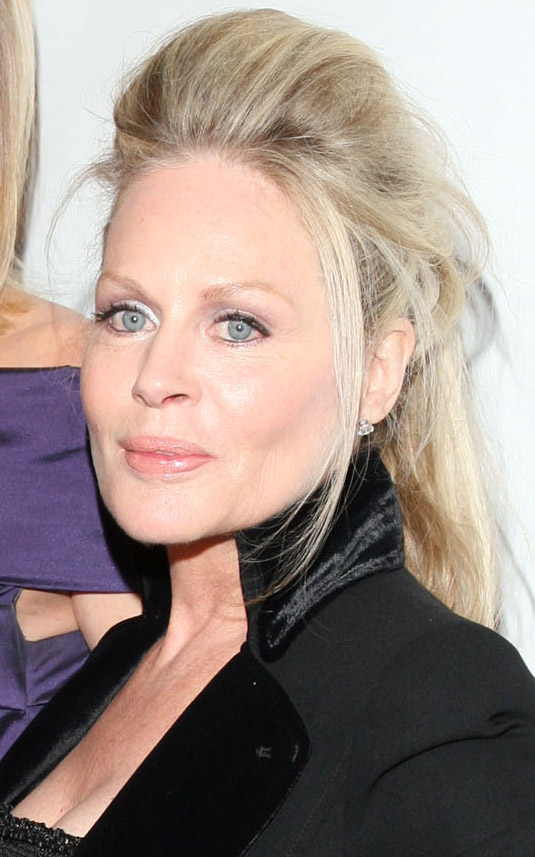
- D'Angelo in 2012
- Born: Beverly Heather D'Angelo; November 15, 1951 (age 74); Columbus, Ohio, U.S.
- Occupation: Actress
- Years active: 1976–present
- Spouse: Don Lorenzo Salviati (m. 1981; div. 1995)
- Partners: Anton Furst (1991); Al Pacino (1997–2003)
- Children: 2
- Relatives: Howard Dwight Smith (grandfather)
- Website: beverlydangelo.com

Beverly Heather D'Angelo (born November 15, 1951) is an American actress who starred as Ellen Griswold in the National Lampoon's Vacation films (1983–2015). She has appeared in over 60 films and was nominated for a Golden Globe Award for her role as Patsy Cline in Coal Miner's Daughter (1980), and for an Emmy Award for her role as Stella Kowalski in the TV film A Streetcar Named Desire (1984). D'Angelo's other film roles include Sheila Franklin in Hair (1979) and Doris Vinyard in American History X (1998).

== Early life ==
D'Angelo was born in Columbus, Ohio, the daughter of Priscilla Ruth (née Smith), a violinist, and Eugene Constantino "Gene" D'Angelo Jr. a bass player and television station manager at WBNS-TV in Columbus. Her father was of Italian descent. Her paternal grandparents, Eugenio and Rosina D'Angelo were from Introdacqua in the Abruzzo region of Italy. She has three brothers, Jeff, Tim and Tony. Their maternal grandfather, Howard Dwight Smith, was an architect who designed the Ohio Stadium, nicknamed "the Horseshoe" at Ohio State University.

D'Angelo attended Upper Arlington High School in Upper Arlington, Ohio, a northwest Columbus suburb. In 2009, she was awarded the Upper Arlington Alumni Association (UAAA) Distinguished Alumnus Award for achievement in her career.

D'Angelo worked as an illustrator at Hanna-Barbera Studios and as a singer before pursuing an interest in acting. While living for a period in Canada, she was a backup singer for American-born rockabilly singer Rompin' Ronnie Hawkins' band The Hawks. After going out on their own they became The Band, a group that is considered legendary.

== Career ==
D'Angelo began acting in the theatre, appearing on Broadway in 1976 in Rockabye Hamlet (also known as Kronborg: 1582), a musical based on Shakespeare's Hamlet. She made her television debut in the first three episodes of the TV mini-series Captains and the Kings in 1976.

After gaining a minor role in Annie Hall in 1977, D'Angelo appeared in a string of hit films including Every Which Way but Loose (1978), Hair (1979), and Coal Miner's Daughter (1980), the last earning her a nomination for a Golden Globe Award for Best Supporting Actress – Motion Picture for her performance as Patsy Cline. She also won a Country Music Association award for Album of the Year.

Her biggest break came in 1983 starring with Chevy Chase in National Lampoon's Vacation in the role of Ellen Griswold. She reprised this role in four Vacation sequels (1985's National Lampoon's European Vacation, 1989's National Lampoon's Christmas Vacation, 1997's Vegas Vacation, and 2015's Vacation), and the 2010 short film Hotel Hell Vacation. She also starred in other comedy films in the 1980s including Maid to Order (1987) and High Spirits (1988).

D'Angelo received an Emmy Award nomination for her performance as Stella Kowalski in the 1984 TV film version of A Streetcar Named Desire. She later had main roles in a number of made-for-television dramatic films, including Slow Burn (1986), Hands of a Stranger (1987), Judgment Day: The John List Story (1993), Menendez: A Killing in Beverly Hills (1994), and Sweet Temptation (1996).

In 1994, D'Angelo returned to the stage and won a Theatre World Award for her performance in the Off-Broadway play Simpatico. She also continued acting in films. She played Dolly Green (the co-worker of Sally Field's character) in the psychological thriller Eye for an Eye (1996) and Doris Vinyard (the mother of Edward Norton's character) in the crime drama American History X (1998). In the mid to late 1990s, she acted in many independent films including Pterodactyl Woman from Beverly Hills (1997) and Illuminata (1998).

In the 2000s, D'Angelo had a recurring role on Law & Order: Special Victims Unit as defense attorney Rebecca Balthus. She also worked as a voice actress. In 1992 she had a guest appearance in the third season of The Simpsons as Lurleen Lumpkin, a Southern country singer and waitress in the "Colonel Homer" episode. Sixteen years later in 2008, she appeared in the nineteenth season as the same character in the episode "Papa Don't Leech", and again in 2025 during season 36 in the episode "P.S., I Hate You" .

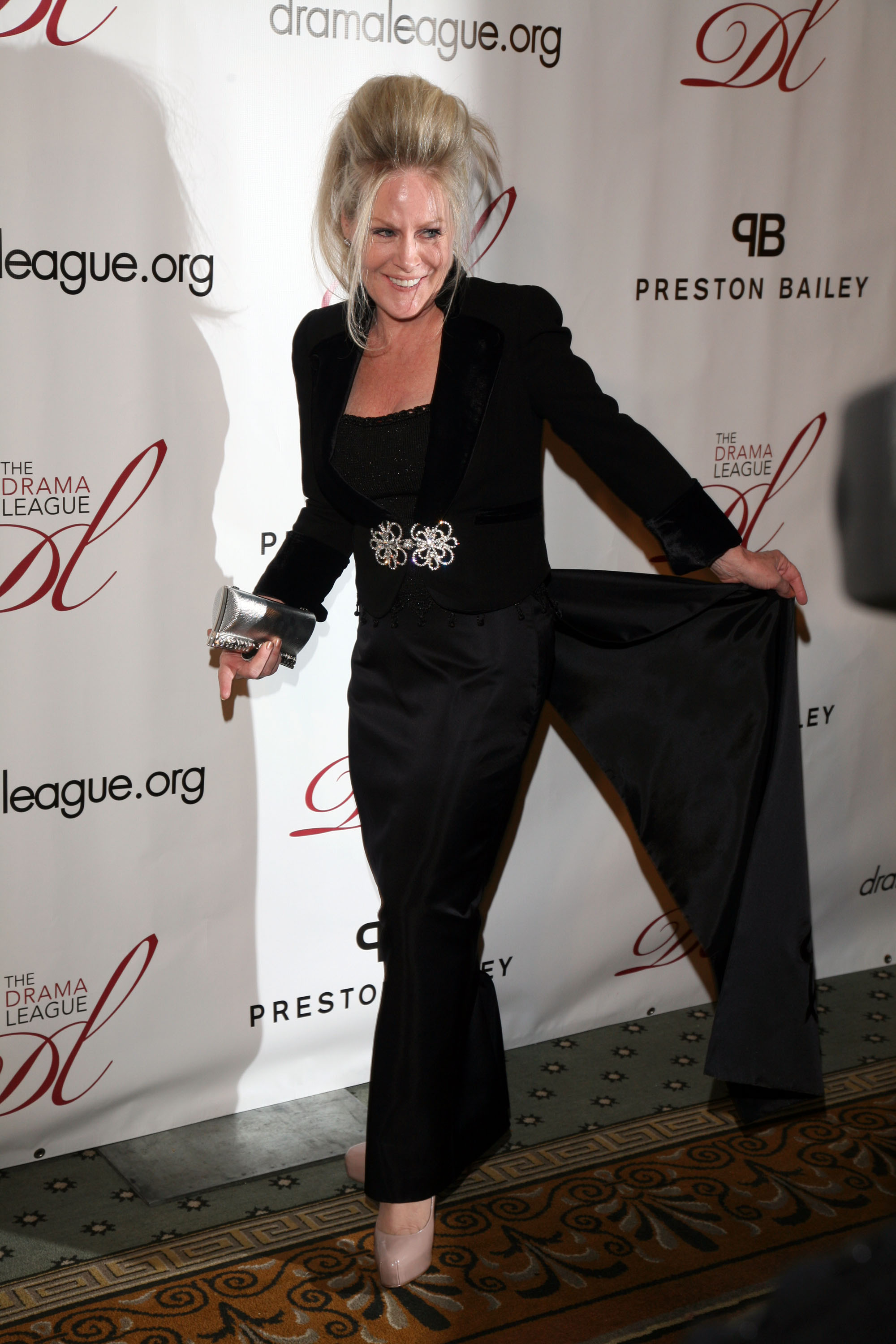
D'Angelo in 2012

From 2005 to 2011, D'Angelo appeared in the HBO series Entourage playing the role of agent Barbara "Babs" Miller. In 2006 she starred in the independent film Gamers: The Movie. In 2008, D'Angelo had a role in the film Harold & Kumar Escape from Guantanamo Bay as Sally. She played the housemother in the film The House Bunny (2008), and also appeared in the Tony Kaye film Black Water Transit (2009).

In 2014, D'Angelo was cast alongside Chevy Chase in an ABC comedy pilot called Chev & Bev, about a retired couple having to raise their grandchildren. ABC opted against making a series. She later made appearances in the television series Mom, Shooter, and Insatiable. In 2022, she played Gertrude in the Christmas action comedy Violent Night.

D'Angelo narrates a short biographical film about Patsy Cline, which is shown to visitors of The Patsy Cline Museum in Nashville, Tennessee. The museum opened to the public on April 7, 2017.

== Personal life ==
D'Angelo was romantically involved with director Neil Jordan, and Miloš Forman, who directed her in Hair (1979). In 1981, she married Italian Don Lorenzo Salviati, who is the only son and heir of Don Forese Salviati, 5th Duke Salviati, Marchese di Montieri and Boccheggiano, Nobile Romano Coscritto, and his wife, the former Maria Grazia Gawronska.

Later, she began a relationship with Anton Furst, an Academy Award-winning production designer, who died by suicide in 1991. She was in a relationship with actor Al Pacino from 1997 until 2003. The couple had twins conceived through IVF, a son and daughter born January 25, 2001.

== Filmography ==
=== Film ===
Year	Title	Role	Notes
1977	Annie Hall	Actress in Rob's T.V. Show	
1977	The Sentinel	Sandra	
1977	First Love	Shelley	
1978	Every Which Way but Loose	Echo	
1979	Hair	Sheila Franklin	
1980	Coal Miner's Daughter	Patsy Cline	Nominated — Golden Globe Award for Best Supporting Actress – Motion Picture
1981	Honky Tonk Freeway	Carmen Odessa Shelby	
1981	Paternity	Maggie	
1982	Highpoint	Lise	
1983	National Lampoon's Vacation	Ellen Griswold	
1984	Finders Keepers	Standish Logan	
1985	Get Out of My Room	Harriet	
1985	National Lampoon's European Vacation	Ellen Griswold	
1986	Big Trouble	Blanche Rickey	
1987	In the Mood	Francine Glatt	
1987	Aria	Gilda	Segment "Rigoletto"
1987	Maid to Order	Stella Winston	
1988	Trading Hearts	Donna Nottingham	
1988	High Spirits	Sharon Brogan Crawford	
1989	Cold Front	Amanda O'Rourke	
1989	National Lampoon's Christmas Vacation	Ellen Griswold	
1990	Daddy's Dyin'... Who's Got the Will?	Evalita Turnover	
1990	Pacific Heights	Ann Miller	Uncredited
1991	The Miracle	Renee Baker	
1991	The Pope Must Die	Veronica Dante	
1991	Lonely Hearts	Alma	
1992	Man Trouble	Andy Ellerman	
1994	Lightning Jack	Lana Castel	
1995	The Crazysitter	Edie	
1996	Eye for an Eye	Dolly Green	
1996	Edie & Pen	Barlady	
1996	Love Always	Miranda	
1997	Vegas Vacation	Ellen Griswold	Nominated — Kids' Choice Award for Favorite Movie Actress
1997	A Rat's Tale	Mrs. Dollart	
1997	Nowhere	Dark's Mom	
1997	Pterodactyl Woman from Beverly Hills	Pixie Chandler	
1997	The Good Life		Never released
1998	Merchants of Venus	Mistress Cody	
1998	Illuminata	Astergourd	
1998	With Friends Like These...	Theresa Carpenter	
1998	American History X	Doris Vinyard	Nominated — Satellite Award for Best Supporting Actress – Motion Picture
1998	Divorce: A Contemporary Western	Linda	
1999	Sugar Town	Jane	
1999	Get Bruce	Herself	
1999	Jazz Night	Kate Winslow	Short film
2000	High Fidelity	Woman selling records	Deleted scene
2001	Women in Film	Phyllis Wolf	
2001	Happy Birthday	Bag Lady	Cameo
2001	Summer Catch	Lusty House Mother	Uncredited
2003	Where's Angelo?	Auntie Nanny	Short film
2004	Hair High	Darlene	Voice
2004	King of the Corner	Betsy Ingraham	
2006	Gamers: The Movie	Gordon's Mom	
2006	Relative Strangers	Angela Minnola	
2007	Game of Life	Kathy	
2007	Battle for Terra	Interrogator Wright	Voice
2008	Harold & Kumar Escape from Guantanamo Bay	Sally	
2008	Partigiano	Mother's voice	Voice
2008	The House Bunny	Mrs. Hagstrom	
2009	Aussie and Ted's Great Adventure	Aunt Zelda	
2009	Black Water Transit	Valeriana Schick	
2010	Hotel Hell Vacation	Ellen Griswold	Short film
2010	April 86	Rose D'Andrea	Short film
2012	I Heart Shakey	Sheila	
2013	Bounty Killer	Lucille	
2013	All American Christmas Carol	Ghost of Christmas Yet to Come	
2014	Popcorn Ceiling	Jerri	
2015	Accidental Love	Helen Eckle	
2015	Under the Bed	Sandra Monroe	
2015	Vacation	Ellen Griswold	
2016	Dreamland	Marie	
2017	Wakefield	Babs	
2018	Frat Pack	Moira	
2018	The Unicorn	Edie	
2021	The Good House	Mamie Lang	
2022	Violent Night	Gertrude Lightstone	
2024	Drugstore June	Marla	
2024	Summer Camp	Jane	
2024	The Trainer	Jack's Mom	
2025	No Address	Dora	
2026	Sleepwalker	Gloria Pangborn	Also executive producer
2026	Wrong Side of Dead	Sandra	
2026	Christmas at the Kringles	Mama K Kringle	
2027	Paris Paramount	TBA	Filming

=== Television films ===
Year	Title	Role	Notes
1984	A Streetcar Named Desire	Stella DuBois Kowalski	Nominated—Primetime Emmy Award for Outstanding Supporting Actress in a Limited Series or Movie
1985	Doubletake	Caroline Wallace	
1986	Slow Burn	Laine Fleischer	
1987	Hands of a Stranger	Mary Hearn	
1987	The Man Who Fell to Earth	Eva Milton	
1992	Trial: The Price of Passion	Johnnie Faye Boudreau	
1992	A Child Lost Forever: The Jerry Sherwood Story	Jerry Sherwood	
1993	Judgment Day: The John List Story	Helen List	
1994	Jonathan Stone: Threat of Innocence	Annie Hayes	
1994	Menendez: A Killing in Beverly Hills	Kitty Menendez	
1996	Widow's Kiss	Vivian Fairchild	
1996	Sweet Temptation	Jesse Larson	
1999	Lansky	Teddy Lansky	
2013	The Good Mother	Judge Kennedy	
2014	The Michaels	Millie Barnworth	

=== Television series ===
Year	Title	Role	Notes
1976	Captains and the Kings	Miss Emmy	3 episodes
1983	Faerie Tale Theatre	Henbane	Episode: "Sleeping Beauty"
1985	Tall Tales & Legends	Katrina Van Tassel	Episode: "The Legend of Sleepy Hollow"
1992	Tales from the Crypt	Janice Baird	Episode: "Werewolf Concerto"
1992, 2008, 2025	The Simpsons	Lurleen Lumpkin	Voice, 3 episodes
1999	Frasier	Audrey	Voice, episode: "The Show Where Woody Shows Up"
1999	Rude Awakening	Sidney 'Syd' Gibson	4 episodes
2000	Talk to Me	Dr. Debra	3 episodes
2003–2008	Law & Order: Special Victims Unit	Rebecca Balthus	5 episodes
2005–2011	Entourage	Barbara Miller	25 episodes
2007	Imperfect Union	Maizy	Unsold TV pilot
2007	Family Guy	Ellen Griswold	Voice, episode: "Blue Harvest"
2008	Skip Tracer	Donna King	Unsold TV pilot
2010	Cougar Town	Sheila Keller	Episode: "What Are You Doin' in My Life?"
2010	Scooby-Doo! Mystery Incorporated	Sheila Altoonian / Mom	Voice, 1 episode
2014	Friends with Better Lives	Gretchen	Episode: "Something New"
2015	Mom	Lorraine	3 episodes
2015	Chev & Bev	Beverly	Unsold TV pilot
2017–2018	Shooter	Patricia Gregson	6 episodes
2018–2019	Insatiable	Stella Rose Buckley	5 episodes
2019	The Filth	Millionairess	Episode: "Filthy Day Jobs"
2022	Law & Order: Special Victims Unit	Serafina Carisi	Episode: "Promising Young Gentlemen"
2022	Little Ellen	Adelaide	Voice, 2 episodes
2023	True Lies	Director Susan Trilby	2 episodes
