= The Astronaut (2025 film) =

Film by Jess Varley

- Theatrical release poster
- Directed by: Jess Varley
- Written by: Jess Varley
- Produced by: Brad Fuller; Eric B. Fleischman; Chris Abernathy; Cameron Fuller
- Starring: Kate Mara; Laurence Fishburne; Gabriel Luna; Scarlett Holmes
- Cinematography: David Garbett
- Edited by: Joel Griffen; Terel Gibson
- Music by: Jacques Brautbar
- Production companies: The Wonder Company; Grinder Monkey
- Distributed by: Vertical
- Release dates: March 7, 2025 (SXSW); October 17, 2025 (United States)
- Running time: 91 minutes
- Country: United States
- Language: English

The Astronaut is a 2025 American science fiction horror film written and directed by Jess Varley and starring Kate Mara, Laurence Fishburne, Gabriel Luna, and Ivana Miličević. The film depicts an astronaut who believes an extraterrestrial entity has followed her back to Earth. It received mixed reviews from critics.

== Plot ==
Sam Walker, a NASA astronaut, crash-lands on Earth after her shuttle to the International Space Station is hit by debris. The U.S. Coast Guard rescues her and she wakes up in the hospital where doctors in hazmat suits question her about the incident. Sam remembers nothing and is placed in quarantine. Sam's husband, Mark, and daughter, Izzy, visit her, and her father, U.S. Army General William Harris, tells her the Pentagon is taking over the investigation of the crash.

Sam is confined to an isolated rural cottage for her protection. She has hallucinations of shadow soldiers, black shadows stalk her from the nearby woods, and the bruise she received during reentry is spreading. Discovering she has telekinetic powers, she completes a series of medical tests and calls Mark, who tells her the family is struggling to cope with her absence. Sam detects a series of hidden cameras surrounding the cottage, then trips over a log and falls unconscious. William scolds Sam for nearly breaking protocol and demonstrates that the hidden cameras link to an underground bunker in the house, to shelter from intruders in. Later that night, the electricity cuts out and the alarm system is triggered, locking Sam inside. A black creature enters the home and Sam locks herself in the bunker. The security cameras reveal the black creature has disappeared back into the woods.

The next day William brings scientists to conduct another round of medical tests. When Mark and Izzy visit, Sam privately tells Mark about the black creatures and reveals the purpose of her space mission was to oversee the transmission of a message intended for extraterrestrial life. Sam believes something detected the message and followed her back to Earth. While walking around the property, the family is suddenly attacked by a swarm of cicadas that forces them back inside. The insects cover the building, blacking out all the windows. Moments later the cicadas die en masse, their remains form a strange set of shapes around the property when viewed from above.

Sam discovers more bruises. That night the power goes out again and the alarms indicate another breach. Sam trips as she retreats into the bunker, and her body is covered in a placenta-like material. The monitors show three creatures inside the house. When they enter the bunker, Sam flees through the air ducts into the woods. There the creatures telepathically confront her, revealing they're her real family. Sam is actually an alien like them. Her hallucinations are memories of government pursuit following the crash of their ship in the Mojave Desert years earlier. Sam was separated from her family and took on the guise of a little human girl, whom William assumed to have saved, and this disguise is starting to wear off. Mark and Izzy learn from William that Sam's mission was intended to lure in the other aliens that landed years ago so they can be captured by the government.

Sam's human body deteriorates, revealing her alien form to Mark and Izzy. Sam says goodbye to her Earth family before boarding a spaceship. Her human family and government pursuers watch as the large craft flies into the night sky.

== Cast ==
- Kate Mara as Sam Walker
- Laurence Fishburne as General William Harris
- Gabriel Luna as Mark
- Scarlett Holmes as Izzy
- Ivana Miličević as Dr. Michelle Aiden
- Macy Gray as Val

== Production ==
The Astronaut marks the solo feature writing and directing debut of Jess Varley. It was produced by Brad Fuller, Eric B. Fleischman and Cameron Fuller. Laurence Fishburne and Emma Roberts were cast in early 2023. In September 2023, Kate Mara (replacing Roberts) and Gabriel Luna joined the cast.

Principal photography took place in Ireland in late 2023. By February 2024, the film was in post-production.

== Release ==
The Astronaut premiered at the 2025 South by Southwest Film & TV Festival on March 7. In September 2025, Vertical acquired U.S. rights to the film. It was theatrically released in the United States on October 17, 2025.

== Reception ==
On the review aggregator website Rotten Tomatoes, 38% of 26 critics' reviews are positive. Metacritic, which uses a weighted average, assigned the film a score of 40 out of 100, based on 8 critics, indicating "mixed or average" reviews.
