= When Did Your Heart Go Missing? =

Single by Rooney

from the album Calling the World
- Released: March 6, 2007
- Recorded: Los Angeles, California
- Length: 3:31 (album version); 3:33 (iTunes version)
- Label: Geffen
- Songwriter: Robert Coppola Schwartzman
- Producer: John Fields

Rooney singles chronology
| "I'm Shakin'" (2004) | "When Did Your Heart Go Missing?" (2007) | "I Should've Been After You" (2007) |

"When Did Your Heart Go Missing?" is the lead single from Los Angeles band Rooney from their second album Calling the World. It is their most successful single to date.

== Charts ==
The song did not chart on the Billboard Hot 100, but landed at number 14 on the Bubbling Under Hot 100.

=== Weekly charts ===
| Chart (2007) | Peak position |
|---|---|
| Czech Republic (Rádio – Top 100) | 5 |
| Germany (Official German Charts) | 17 |
| Germany Airplay (BVMI) | 1 |
| Italy (FIMI) | 29 |
| Netherlands (Dutch Top 40) | 27 |
| Slovakia (Rádio Top 100) | 30 |
| UK Singles Chart | 45 |
| US Billboard Bubbling Under Hot 100 | 14 |
| US Billboard Hot Dance Club Play | 34 |
| US Billboard Hot Digital Songs | 66 |
| US Billboard Pop 100 | 82 |

=== Year-end charts ===
| Chart (2007) | Rank |
|---|---|
| German Singles Chart | 88 |

== Music video ==
At the beginning of the music video, lead singer Robert Carmine's mother actress Talia Shire has a cameo. The video was directed by Benny Boom.

== In films and television ==
The song was featured in the second episode of Gossip Girl, the ending of the film Nancy Drew, and the sixth episode of Roswell New Mexico (TV series).
