= Dreamland (2016 film) =

- Theatrical release poster
- Directed by: Robert Schwartzman
- Written by: Benjamin Font; Robert Schwartzman
- Produced by: Mel Eslyn; Robert Schwartzman
- Starring: Johnny Simmons; Amy Landecker; Beverly D'Angelo; Frankie Shaw; Alan Ruck; Shay Mitchell; Nick Thune; Jason Schwartzman; Noël Wells; Talia Shire
- Cinematography: Benjamin Kasulke
- Edited by: Chris Donlon
- Production companies: Beachwood Park Films; Tilt/Shift Films
- Distributed by: Orion Pictures; Gunpowder & Sky
- Release dates: April 14, 2016 (Tribeca Film Festival); November 11, 2016 (United States)
- Running time: 84 minutes
- Country: United States
- Language: English

Dreamland is a 2016 American comedy-drama film directed by Robert Schwartzman in his directorial debut, from a screenplay by Benjamin Font and Schwartzman. It stars Johnny Simmons, Amy Landecker, Jason Schwartzman, Noël Wells, Alan Ruck, Beverly D'Angelo, Talia Shire, Shay Mitchell, Frankie Shaw and Nick Thune.

The film had its world premiere at the Tribeca Film Festival on April 14, 2016. The film was released in a limited release and through video on demand by Orion Pictures and Gunpowder & Sky on November 11, 2016.

== Premise ==
Monty Fagan (Johnny Simmons), a pianist, begins a relationship that upends his home life.

== Cast ==
- Johnny Simmons as Monty Fagan
- Amy Landecker as Olivia
- Jason Schwartzman as Peter
- Noël Wells as Joanna
- Alan Ruck as Walter
- Beverly D'Angelo as Marie
- Talia Shire as Victoria
- Shay Mitchell as Nicole
- Frankie Shaw as Lizzie
- Nick Thune as Jason
- Robin Thomas as Allen
- William M. Schwartzman as David
- Brittany Furlan as Emily
- Jeff Barry as Fred Russo

== Production ==
In March 2015, it was revealed Robert Schwartzman would direct the film in his directorial debut from a screenplay by him and Benjamin Font, with Johnny Simmons, Amy Landecker, Frankie Shaw and Beverly D'Angelo would star in the film, while Schwartzman and Mel Eslyn producing.

== Release ==
The film had its world premiere at the Tribeca Film Festival on April 14, 2016. Shortly thereafter, Orion Pictures and Gunpowder & Sky acquired US and Latin American rights to the film and set the release date for November 11, 2016.

=== Critical reception ===
Dreamland received mixed-to-positive reviews from film critics. Review aggregator Rotten Tomatoes gave the film a 67% approval rating, based on nine reviews, with an average rating of 5.92/10. On Metacritic, the film holds a rating of 55 out of 100, based on 4 critics, indicating "mixed or average" reviews.
