= Nicholas Rutherford =

American comedian, actor, and writer

Nick Rutherford
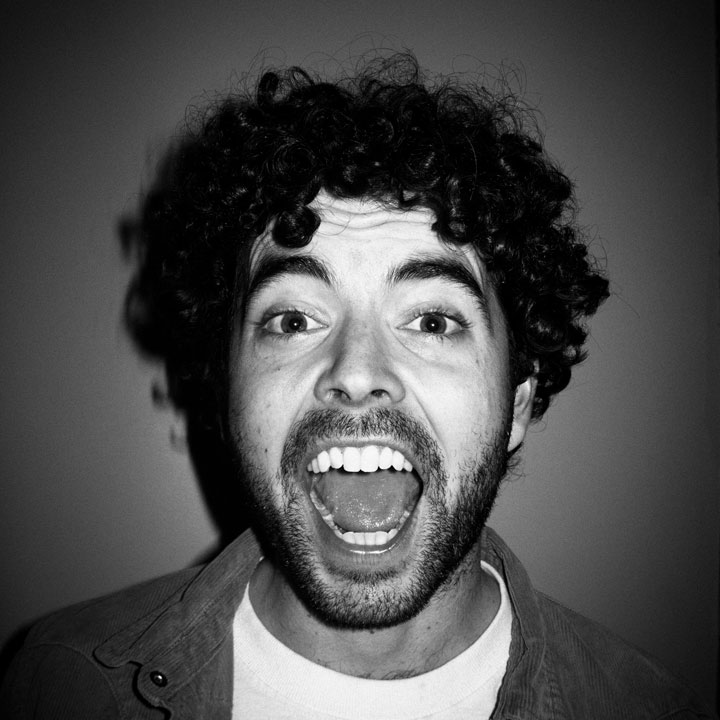
- Rutherford in 2012
- Born: Nicholas J. Rutherford; August 7, 1982 (age 44); Thousand Oaks, California, U.S.
- Education: University of Southern California
- Occupations: Actor; comedian; writer
- Years active: 1987–present
- Website: Official website

Nicholas Rutherford is an American actor, comedian, writer, and founding member of the sketch comedy group Good Neighbor. He is best known for starring as Patient 88 in the Adult Swim series Dream Corp LLC and for his work as a writer and producer on Rick and Morty. He has also contributed as a writer for Saturday Night Live.

== Early life ==
Rutherford is from Thousand Oaks, California. He attended college at the University of Southern California, where he performed in the school's improv and sketch comedy group, Commedus Interruptus.

== Career ==
In 2007, Rutherford formed the sketch comedy group Good Neighbor alongside Kyle Mooney, Beck Bennett, and Dave McCary. In 2014, Rutherford joined the writing staff for season 40 of Saturday Night Live.

On April 30, 2014, he appeared as a guest on the web series Talking Marriage with Ryan Bailey. From 2016 to 2020, Rutherford starred in the Adult Swim series Dream Corp, LLC, on which he also contributed as a writer. In 2015, he worked as a voice actor and writer on the Fox animated series Golan the Insatiable, penning the fourth season episode, "Shell Raiser."

Since 2019, Rutherford has served as a writer and co-executive producer on Rick and Morty.

== Filmography ==
=== Film ===
Year	Title	Role	Notes
1988	Big Business	Lil Levon	
1990	Pacific Heights	Child	
2001	The Bunker	Deserter	
2013	The Kings of Summer	Visor	
2014	Balls Out	Hank	
2017	Brigsby Bear	Excited Man	
2018	Don't Worry, He Won't Get Far on Foot	Drinker	
2018	Blood Fest	Lenjamin Caine	
2018	The Unicorn	Caleb	
2023	Robots	Ted Jr.	
2024	Drugstore June	Max	

=== Television ===
Year	Title	Role	Notes
1987	Nutcracker: Money, Madness and Murder	Marco (age 4)	3 episodes
1987–1989	The Tracey Ullman Show	Max	5 episodes
1988	Family Ties	Young Skippy	Episode: "Heartstrings: Part 3"
1990	Family of Spies	Michael #1	2 episodes
1990	Dear John	Joey	Episode: "Some Nights to Remember"
1990	The Fresh Prince of Bel-Air	Caroler #3	Episode: "Deck the Halls"
1990-1991	Amen	Tommy McAllister	5 episodes
1991	Murder in High Places		Television movie
1991	Homefront	Trick-or-Treater	Episode: "Holier Than Thou, Too"
1993	Civil Wars		Episode: "Captain Kangaroo Court"
2006	Campus Ladies	Nick	Episode: "Pilot"
2010	Nick Swardson's Pretend Time	Random Guy	Episode: "Blah Blah Blah Main Street”
2011	The Office	Waiter	Episode: "Garden Party"
2012	Loiter Squad		Writer
2014	Key & Peele	College Kid	Episode: "Scariest Movie Ever"
2013–2015	Axe Cop		Writer, co-producer
2014–2015	Saturday Night Live		Writer
2015	Major Lazer		Writer, producer
2015	Golan the Insatiable	Keith Knudsen Jr.	Writer, story editor
2016–2020	Dream Corp LLC	Patient 88	Main role
2019–present	Rick and Morty	Nick	Writer, co-executive producer
2023	The Eric Andre Show		Consulting producer
2023	The Prank Panel	Multiple roles	2 episodes
2024-2025	Krapopolis	Additional voices	8 episodes
2026	Jury Duty Presents: Company Retreat	Cole	2 episodes
