= Kevin Kirkpatrick =

Australian rules footballer

Personal information
- Born: 11 January 1944
- Died: 17 August 2025
- Original team: North Geelong
- Height: 179 cm (5 ft 10 in)
- Weight: 73 kg (161 lb)

Playing career^{1}
Years	Club	Games (Goals)
1964	Geelong	2 (0)
- ^{1} Playing statistics correct to the end of 1964.

Kevin Kirkpatrick (born 11 January 1944) is a former Australian rules footballer who played with Geelong in the Victorian Football League (VFL).
