= Johnny Simmons =

American actor

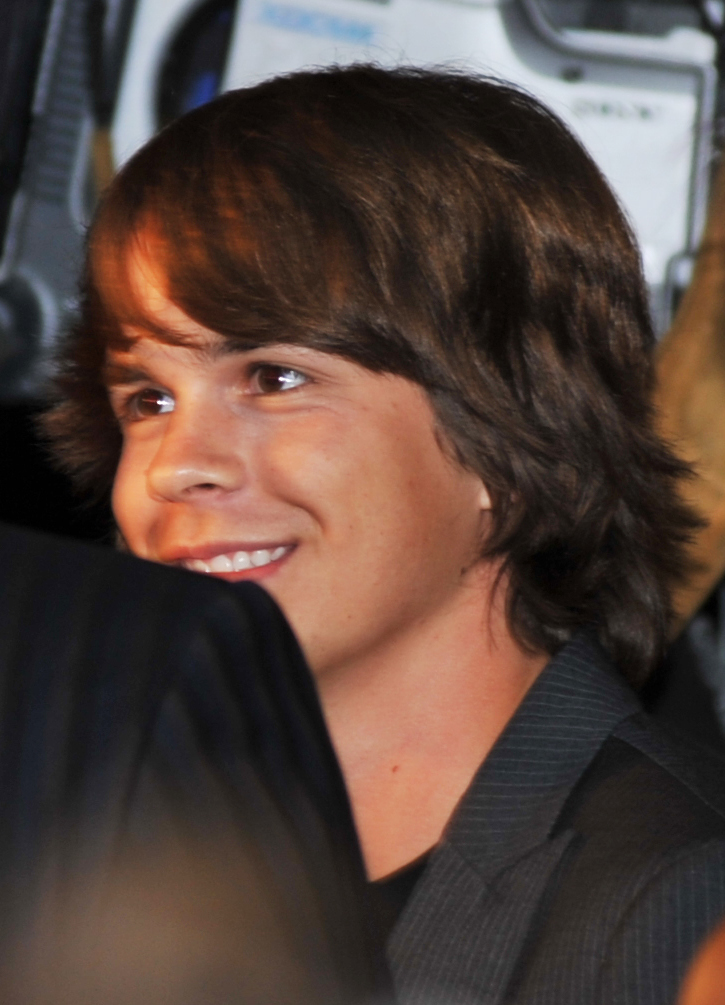
- Simmons in 2009
- Born: November 28, 1986 (age 39); Montgomery, Alabama
- Occupation: Actor
- Years active: 2004–2017, 2023–present

Johnny Simmons is an American actor. He is known for his roles as Dylan Baxter in Evan Almighty (2007), Chip Dove in Jennifer's Body (2009), Dave in Hotel for Dogs (2009), "Young Neil" Nordegraf in Scott Pilgrim vs. the World (2010) and Scott Pilgrim Takes Off (2023), Cameron in The To Do List (2013) with Aubrey Plaza, Brad Hayes in The Perks of Being a Wallflower (2012), serial killer Adam "Balloon Man" Kemper in Elementary (2012), Peter Newmans in The Late Bloomer (2016), and Shane in Girlboss (2017).

== Early life ==
Simmons grew up in Dallas, Texas.

== Career ==
Simmons landed his first feature film role in the 2007 comedy Evan Almighty. He portrayed Dylan Baxter, the oldest of the three sons of Steve Carell's Evan Baxter and Lauren Graham's Joan Baxter. He then starred in a number of films, including the 2009 children's comedy Hotel for Dogs, opposite Jake T. Austin and Emma Roberts. Also in 2009, Simmons starred in the black comedy horror film Jennifer's Body as Chip Dove, the boyfriend of Amanda Seyfried's character, Anita "Needy" Lesnicki. In 2010, he starred in the comedy film Scott Pilgrim vs. the World, portraying Young Neil, a 20-year-old bass guitarist and fan of the fictional band Sex Bob-omb. In 2011, he was cast in a supporting role for the Jonah Hill and Channing Tatum led comedy 21 Jump Street (2012).

Also in 2012, Simmons co-starred as the closeted quarterback Brad Hayes, alongside Logan Lerman, Emma Watson, and Ezra Miller, in the teen drama The Perks of Being a Wallflower. The film is an adaptation of the Stephen Chbosky novel of the same name. In February 2013, he was cast in The CW's television drama film Blink. In 2013, he made a cameo appearance in the music video for Drake's single "Hold On, We're Going Home". That same year, Simmons joined the comedy film Frank and Cindy as GJ Erchternkamp, alongside Rene Russo and Oliver Platt. Also that same year, he starred in the short film Whiplash, excerpted from a screenplay by Damien Chazelle, the complete version of which became an Academy Award-winning feature-length film of the same name. In 2014, he starred as Jack London in the Discovery Channel miniseries Klondike, the channel's first scripted series, which detailed the Klondike Gold Rush in the 1890s. In 2015, he co-starred as Jeff Jansen in the thriller film The Stanford Prison Experiment, and in 2016, had the lead role in four films, the border-set thriller Transpecos, the comedy-musical Dreamland, the baseball drama The Phenom, and Kevin Pollak's comedy The Late Bloomer.

On March 30, 2023, it was announced that Simmons would reprise his role as Young Neil in the Netflix series Scott Pilgrim Takes Off.

After a six-year hiatus, Simmons returned to live-action performance with a small role in the 2023 drama film Sing Sing. Simmons played an unnamed inmate who was scammed out of five hundred dollars by Clarence "Divine Eye" Maclin. He also appeared as a local deputy in the action-comedy film Bad Man.

== Filmography ==
=== Film ===
Year	Title	Role	Notes
2004	Then Hereafter	Young Eric	Short film
2006	My Ambition	Jules Walters	Short film
2007	Evan Almighty	Dylan Baxter	
2007	Boogeyman 2	Paul	
2008	Trucker	Teenager #1	
2008	The Spirit	Young Denny Colt	
2009	Hotel for Dogs	Dave	
2009	The Greatest	Ryan Brewer	
2009	Jennifer's Body	Chip Dove	
2010	Scott Pilgrim vs. the World	"Young Neil" Nordegraf	
2010	The Conspirator	John Surratt	
2012	21 Jump Street	Billiam Willingham	
2012	A Bag of Hammers	Kelsey Patterson at 18	
2012	The Perks of Being a Wallflower	Brad Hayes	
2013	Whiplash	Andrew Neiman	Short film
2013	The To Do List	Cameron Mitchell	
2015	The Stanford Prison Experiment	Jeff Jansen / 1037	
2015	Frank and Cindy	GJ Echternkamp	
2016	Transpecos	Benjamin Davis	
2016	Dreamland	Monty Fagan	
2016	The Phenom	Hopper Gibson	
2016	The Late Bloomer	Dr. Peter Newmans	
2023	Sing Sing	Clay	
2025	Bad Man	Sam Evans	

=== Television ===
Year	Title	Role	Notes
2006	Numbers	Matt McCrary	Episode: "Killer Chat"
2011	Cinema Verite	Kevin Loud	Television film
2012	Elementary	Adam Kemper / The Balloon Man	Episode: "Child Predator"
2013	Blink	Dodge Trask	Television film
2014	Klondike	Jack London	Miniseries; 6 episodes
2015	The Good Wife	Erik Barsetto	Episode: "Innocents"
2017	Girlboss	Shane	Main role
2023	Scott Pilgrim Takes Off	"Young Neil" Nordegraf	Main role
