= Ned Brower =

American drummer

- Born: Edward Andrew Brower; December 15, 1978 (age 47); Chapel Hill, North Carolina; United States
- Spouse: Sarah Jane Morris
- Children: 2

Edward Andrew "Ned" Brower (born December 15, 1978) is an American musician, model, nurse, and actor. He was the former drummer/vocalist in the Los Angeles rock quintet Rooney.

== Early life ==
Brower was born in Chapel Hill, North Carolina, and raised in Bellevue, Washington, where his father worked as an ophthalmologist. He attended and graduated from Bellevue High School, where he participated in choir and theater. He then attended Southern Methodist University where he studied film and psychology.

== Career ==
Brower moved to Los Angeles from his hometown of Seattle, Washington in 2000 and began modeling for the likes of the Gap, J Crew, Tommy Hilfiger, Donna Karen, Ralph Lauren, and Abercrombie and Fitch. He went on to act in film and television projects such as Dawson's Creek, The O.C., Big Fat Liar, and Not Another Teen Movie.

In 2002, Brower's band Rooney signed a deal with Interscope/Geffen records and went on to record four studio albums and shoot 10 music videos. Rooney toured with Weezer, The Strokes, and many others, in addition to playing Coachella, Lollapalooza, and other European and Asian music festivals. Rooney was frequently invited to contribute to tribute albums, and recorded cover songs for the Ramones, Queen, T. Rex, and Roy Orbison.

When Rooney disbanded in 2012, Brower earned an EMT certification and worked with the Los Angeles County Fire Department as a first responder. In 2015 he attended the UCLA School of Nursing, where he earned a master's degree in the science of nursing. Following his RN training at UCLA Santa Monica emergency department, he took a full time pediatric emergency nurse position at Children's Hospital Los Angeles.

Currently, Brower continues to play drums while portraying Mick Fleetwood in the 12-year-running Fleetwood Mac musical comedy Rumours Tribute Show, which he co-created in 2013. Brower also serves as band leader for podcast host, comedian, and actor Marc Maron, and has collaborated on music used in Maron's podcasts and standup specials.

In 2024, Brower returned to television when he was cast in the role of Nurse Jesse Van Horn on the HBO Max series The Pitt.

== Personal life ==
Brower is married to his longtime partner, actor Sarah Jane Morris (Brothers and Sisters, NCIS, Felicity, Night Shift). They live in Los Angeles with their two children.

== Filmography ==
=== Actor ===
- Big Fat Liar as Rudy
- Repli-Kate as Stoner
- Not Another Teen Movie as Dude
- The Princess Diaries as Flypaper

=== TV appearances ===
- Dawson's Creek as Elliot Sawyer
- The Young Person's Guide To Becoming A Rock Star as Dom
- The Pitt as Nurse Jesse Van Horn
