= Max Cooper (music producer) =

Northern Irish techno producer (born 1980)

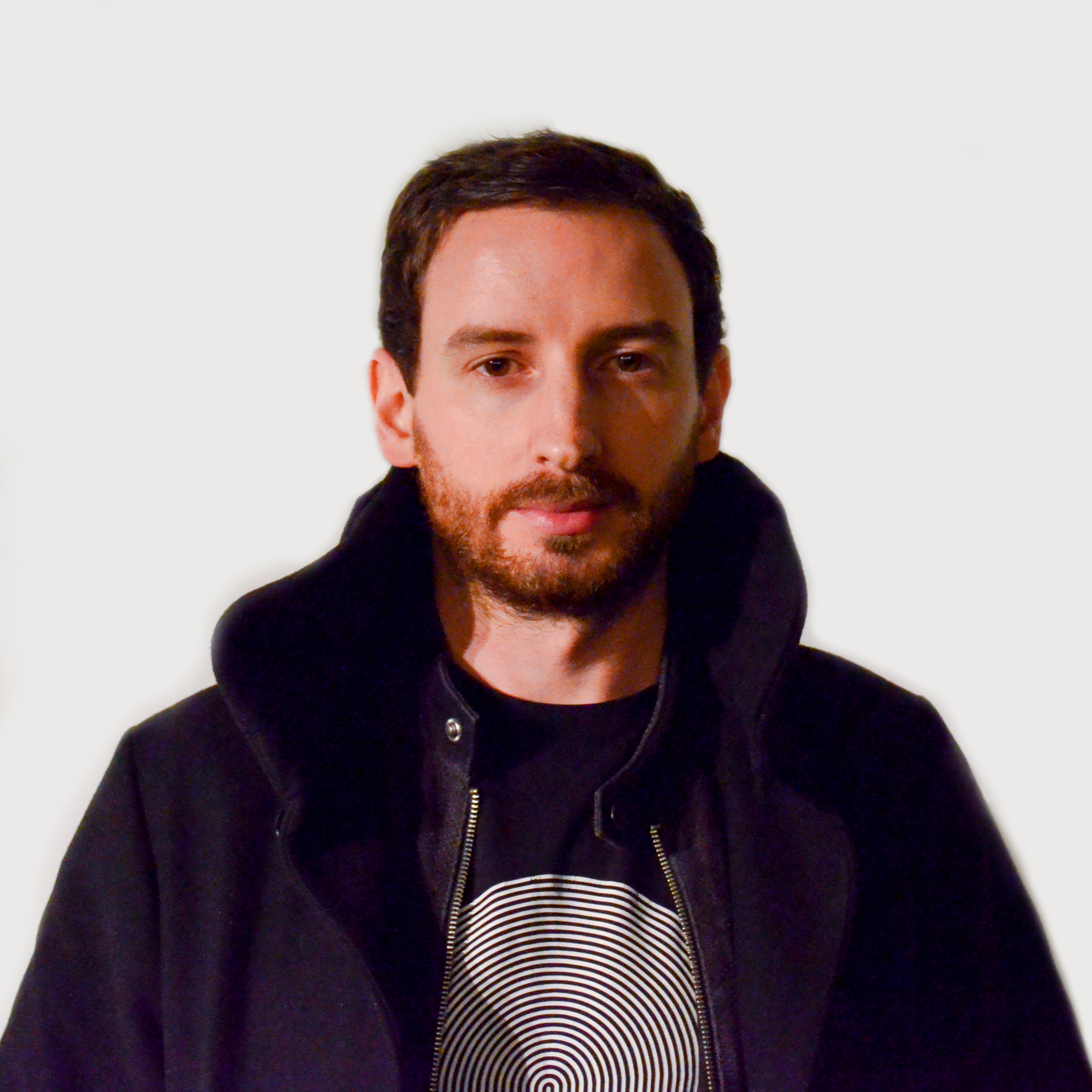
- Max Cooper in 2017

Background information
- Born: 19 May 1980 (age 46); Belfast, Northern Ireland
- Origin: Holywood Rudolf Steiner School; University of Nottingham
- Genres: Electronic; techno; IDM
- Website: maxcooper.net

Max Cooper (born 19 May 1980) is a London-based electronic and techno music producer who has been releasing music since 2007. He has received positive reviews from magazines such as Clash and critical acclaim for his debut album Human.

Cooper has released more than seventy original tracks and remixes, and more than twenty accompanying video works, primarily on London label Fields and German label Traum Schallplatten. His remixes range from avant-garde composers Michael Nyman and Nils Frahm, to bands like Hot Chip and Au Revoir Simone, to techno acts such as Agoria, Sasha and Guy Andrews.

== Early life and education ==
Cooper was born in Belfast, Northern Ireland to parents of Australian descent. He attended the Holywood Steiner School and was inspired to become a geneticist after reading various science books as a child. Although he did not receive formal music training, Cooper started playing violin at age 12, but eventually stopped: "I never enjoyed it [violin] and didn't pursue it to any great degree—the music wasn't right to be honest."

Cooper received his PhD in computational biology from the University of Nottingham in 2008. During his doctoral training, his research interests focused on modelling the evolution of gene regulatory networks—he specifically examined the evolution of feed-forward loops, and studied the evolutionary influences of binding site organisation during transcriptional processes. After completing his doctoral work, Cooper held a brief post-doctoral position as a geneticist at University College London.

== Career ==
=== Music ===
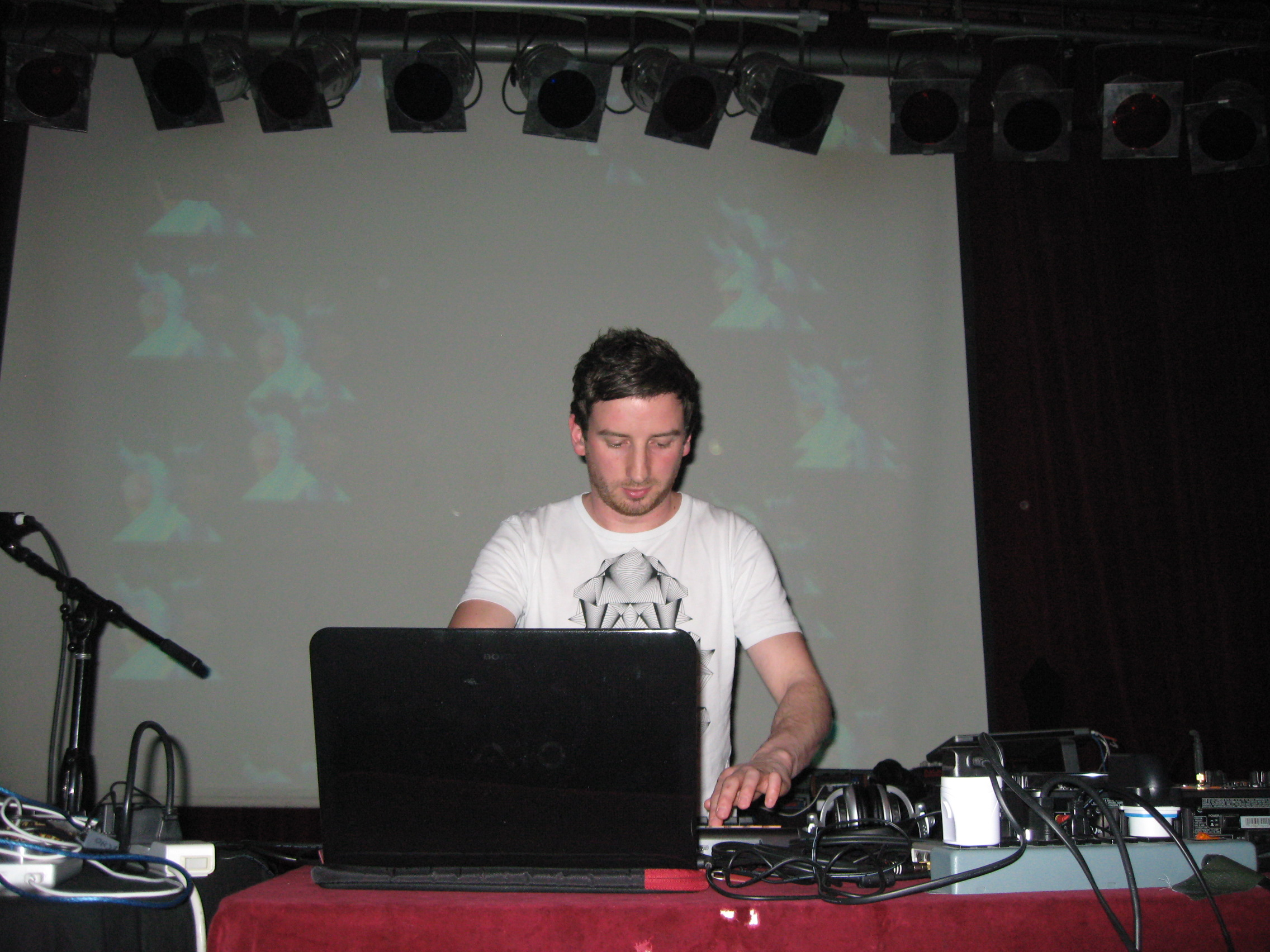
Max Cooper in 2011

In 2010, Cooper decided to focus entirely on music production and his music is influenced by his science background. In terms of musical references, Cooper has cited Jon Hopkins, Sigur Rós and Ólafur Arnalds, adding that his influences are "mainly electronica more than techno". By 2012, he was voted in the top 20 live acts of the year for two years running on Resident Advisor and named a Beatport artist of the year.

Cooper released a two-part EP, Conditions One, on 10 December 2012, which also featured Braids, Ghosting Season and D/R/U/G/S (a.k.a. Callum Wright). That same month, he achieved the number 5 spot on BeatPort's "Top Artists of 2012" and was voted a "top 20" live act by the readers of canonical electronic music website Resident Advisor.

Cooper encourages fans to produce their own videos for his music, with the results displayed on his website. He released a music video for the song "Pleasures" that was animated by artist Cédric de Smedt.

Cooper revealed that some of the artwork on his album covers was inspired by his flatmate, who is a graphic designer.

In December 2013, Cooper announced the release date of his debut album Human as 10 March 2014. The album was preceded by the single "Adrift", which was released on 16 December 2013. In regard to "Adrift", Cooper explained that it is "more of a personal piece of music for me than a club track, which is the approach I’ve taken for the whole album". Human received critical acclaim and was described by Clash as "sumptuous, enticingly beautiful". The release was followed by two remix EPs, Inhuman One and Inhuman Two, with remixes from Rodriguez Jr., Lusine, Harvey McKay, Jack Dixon and Olaf Stuut.

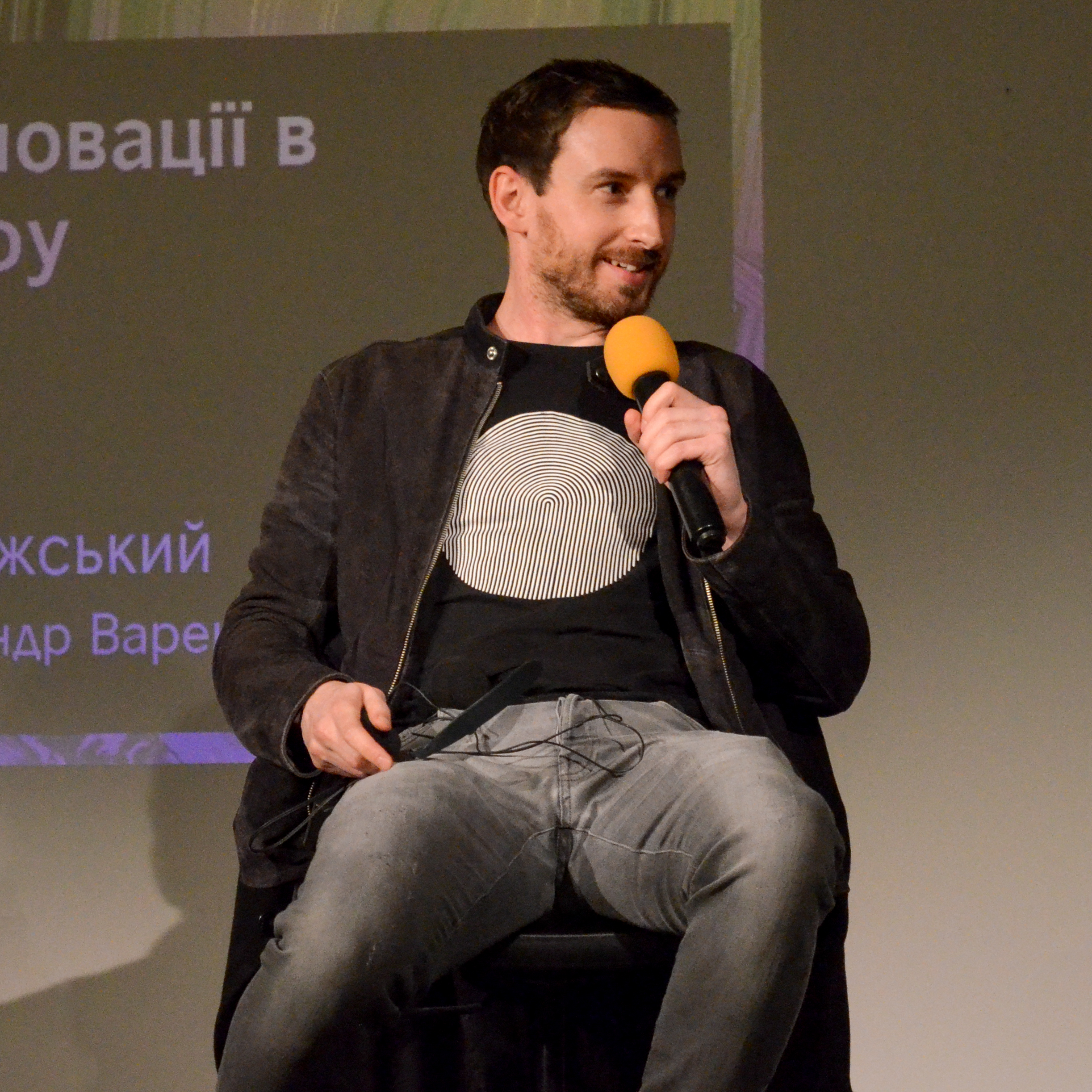
Cooper on musical forum The Selector Pro in Kyiv (2017)

In September 2014, Cooper launched his debut audiovisual show Emergence at the Decibel Festival in Seattle. Performed entirely live and solo, it is a one-man show that ties together his scientific, experimental, musical and visual interests in a single conceptual festival artwork and is on tour in Europe.

In early December 2014, Cooper released his follow-up to Human, the "Kindred EP" featuring singer Kathrin deBoer from trip-hop band Belleruche and remixes from David August and Throwing Snow. The EP features Cooper's experiments with the sansula instrument and the polyphonic analogue Prophet 08 synth and was described by Fact as a "gorgeous slice of electronica". During the summer before the Kindred release, Cooper released "Tileyard Improvisations Vol. 1", a collaboration fusing jazz and electronica.

Max Cooper released his second collaboration with classically trained pianist Tom Hodge, "Artefact" as well as a remix EP of the same name. The music combines piano music with electronica and glitch and was inspired in part by an excursion Cooper made to the Teotihuacan pyramids in Mexico.

Glassforms, a collaboration between Cooper and Bruce Brubaker, featuring the work of Philip Glass, was released 5 June 2020. According to Cooper, "It was a refreshing process coming from my usual approach of mousing around music projects, building things in tiny iterations at a time, and it fed into my solo project techniques a lot as well."

In September 2024, Cooper released The Sun In A Box with a video animation generated using morphogenesis techniques by the digital artist Andy Lomas.

=== Live performance ===
Cooper has performed at numerous festivals, including Glastonbury Festival, Fuji Rock Festival, Bestival, Latitude Festival, Awakenings Festival, MUTEK, Amsterdam Dance Event and Decibel Festival. He has also performed live with artists such as Echaskech and Baltimoroder.

=== Other projects ===
As of 2011, Cooper is working with software company Liine on music-production software that is influenced by science. In December 2012, he wrote a blog for British music magazine NME.

== Equipment ==
Cooper uses Ableton equipment and Akai APC40 controllers. He is also an early adopter of unusual club sound systems, performing in August 2013 on a 3D sound system called "4DSOUND".

== Selected discography ==
=== Studio albums ===
- Human (2014)
- Emergence (25 November 2016)
- Balance (a Mix Project) (4 May 2018)
- One Hundred Billion Sparks (20 September 2018)
- Yearning for the Infinite (7 November 2019)
- Glassforms (5 June 2020)
- Unspoken Words (25 March 2022)
- On Being (28 February 2025)
- Feeling Is Structure (8 May 2026)

=== Singles and EPs ===
Title	Label	Year
8 Billion Realities (with Rob Clouth)	Mesh	2025
Ascent	Mesh	2023
Spectrum	Mesh	2022
Everything	Mesh	2022
Maps	Mesh	2021
Hope	Mesh	2018
World Passing By	Mesh	2017
Chromos	Mesh	2017
Artefact (with Tom Hodge)	Fields	2015
Artefact Remixes (with Tom Hodge)	Fields	2015
Tileyard Improvisations, Vol. 1 (with Kathrin deBoer and Quentin Collins)	Gearbox Records	2014
Kindred EP	Fields	2014
Inhuman Two	Fields	2014
Inhuman One	Fields	2014
Adrift	Fields	2013
Fragments of Self Part Two (with Tom Hodge)	Fields	2013
Fragments of Self Part One (with Tom Hodge)	Fields	2013
Conditions Two (with Kathrin De Boer)	Fields	2013
Conditions One (with Braids)	Fields	2012
Mechanical Concussion EP	Herzblut Recordings	2012
Egomodal EP	Traum Schallplatten	2012
Empirisch EP	Traum Schallplatten	2011
Metaphysical EP	Traum Schallplatten	2011
Amalgamations EP	Last Night on Earth	2011
Miocene EP	Herzblut Recordings	2011
Metaphysical EP	Traum	2011
Expressions EP	–	2010
Series EP	Traum	2010
Ediolic Spectra	Bedrock	2010
Chaotisch Serie EP	Traum	2010
InhaleExhale EP	Veryverywrongindeed	2009
Stochastisch Serie EP	Traum	2009
Symphonica	Traum	2009
Harmonisch Serie EP	Traum	2009
Crushbox EP	Autist	2008
FRANK	Firefly Recordings	2008
One Is None EP	Evolved Records	2007

=== Remixes ===
Title	Label	Year
Ólafur Arnalds – ypsilon – Max Cooper remix	Mercury KX	2019
Rob Clouth – Shedding Layers – Max Cooper remix	Mesh	2018
Christian Löffler – Vind – Max Cooper remix	Ki Records	2017
Sasha – Channel Deq – Max Cooper remix	LateNiteTales	2017
Guy Andrews – In Autumn Arms – Max Cooper remix	Houndstooth	2016
joeFarr – Spectate – Max Cooper remix	Leisuresystem	2016
Michael Nyman and David McAlmont – Secrets, Accusations and Charges – Reconstruction and Deconstruction	Last Night on Earth	2012
Sasha – Xpander – Max Cooper remix	Deconstruction	2011
Hot Chip – I Feel Better – Max Cooper remix	Flash	2010
Andrew K – The Doppler Effect – Max Cooper remix	Vise Versa Music	2010
Au Revoir Simone – Take Me As I Am / Remix	Moshi Moshi	2010
Abe Duque & Blake Baxter – What Happened – Max Cooper remix	Process	2009

== Awards and nominations ==
2016: Berlin Music Video Awards, nominated in the Best Experimental category for 'REMNANTS'
