= Aparde =

German electronica and techno-producer

- Also known as: Aparde
- Born: Paul Camillo Schroeder; 1987 (age 37–38); Wolgast, Germany
- Origin: Berlin, Germany
- Genres: Electronica, ambient music, vocalist
- Occupations: music producer, musician, vocalist, disc jockey
- Years active: 2010–present
- Labels: Stil vor Talent, Lenient Tales, Ki Records, Keller Records, Traum Schallplatten

Aparde (born 1987 near Usedom in Wolgast as Paul Camillo Schroeder) is a German electronica and techno-producer as well as musician, Liveact and DJ.

== Life and career ==
He grew up on the island of Usedom on the Baltic Sea in Mecklenburg-Western Pomerania and attended the Wolgast Music School for nine years, where he learned to play the drums. As an autodidact, he also worked on the piano and the guitar. First audio recordings were also created with own compositions under influences of, among others, Deftones or Radiohead. The Alter ego Aparde is an ancient Greek word creation using the term Apathy.

In 2011 he released the LP Goldene Barrikaden, which followed in the next few years more collections, such as Maerk, Dim, Loom and others. He then published on various Record labels such as Stil vor Talent, Traum Schallplatten, Keller Record Label, Lenient Tales Recordings or Ki Records."Apardes Electronica is simply pure quality", says the imprint of Stil vor Talent, which has been run by Oliver Koletzki for years. Aparde and his titles can be heard amongst other things on FluxFM, the online magazine XLR8R from California, BBC and others. The Atwood Magazine says to his music: "It is rare to listen to a song nowadays and hear the warmth and grit of unadulterated, every day sounds in it." Common interests connect him among other with Christian Löffler and Parra for Cuva. His talent is also expressed in the design of his own cover and Teaser and Video productions. Especially in his albums Glass and Hands Rest as well as in guest productions he uses his warm soulful vocals.

== Discography (selection) ==
Studio albums

- 2019 Hands Rest (Ki Records)
- 2017 Glass (Ki Records)

Singles and EPs

- 2017 Rim (Keller)
- 2016 Maerk EP (Lenient Tales)
- 2016 Dim EP (Lenient Tales)
- 2015 Other (Stil vor Talent)
- 2015 Erosion (Stil vor Talent)
- 2015 Loom EP (Stil vor Talent)
- 2015 Theme (Like Birdz)
- 2015 Dialogue EP (Keller)
- 2013 Thousand Days (Not on Label – Aparde Self-released)
- 2013 Rastlos (Agara Music)
- 2012 Wind in Den Duenen EP (Keller)
- 2012 Amnesie EP (Not on Label – Aparde Self-released)
- 2011 Goldene Barrikaden LP (Not on Label – Aparde Self-released)
- 2010 Distance LP (Dusted Wax Kingdom)

Remixes

- 2017 Christian Löffler – Youth (Aparde Remix) / Ki Records
- 2016 Jan Blomqvist – Stories Over (Aparde Remix) / Armada
- 2016 Robert Babicz – Where are you? (Aparde Remix) / TraumSchallplatten
- 2016 Ryan Davis – Hadron (Aparde Remix) Klangwelt
- 2015 Olaf Stuut – Spirograph (Aparde Remix) / TraumSchallplatten
- 2015 Parra For Cuva – Champa (Aparde Remix) / Lenient Tales
- 2013 Mauro Norti – The Cliff (Aparde Remix) / Agara Music
- 2013 Vandid – Nati (Aparde Remix)
- 2013 Bongbeck – Entrückung (Aparde Remix) / Keller Label
