= Wicked Game =

1989 single by Chris Isaak

- US retail cassette single

Single by Chris Isaak

from the album Heart Shaped World
- B-side: "Don't Make Me Dream About You"
- Released: July 14, 1989
- Recorded: February 1989
- Studio: Fantasy (Berkeley); Dave Wellhausen (San Francisco)
- Genre: Soft rock
- Length: 4:46
- Label: Reprise
- Songwriter: Chris Isaak
- Producer: Erik Jacobsen

Chris Isaak singles chronology
"Don't Make Me Dream About You" (1989)	"Wicked Game" (1989)	"Blue Spanish Sky" (1991)

Music video
- "Wicked Game" on YouTube

"Wicked Game" is a song by American musician Chris Isaak from his third album, Heart Shaped World (1989). It was produced by Erik Jacobsen and released as a single to little attention in July 1989 by Reprise Records; the song became a sleeper hit when Lee Chesnut, an Atlanta radio station music director who loved David Lynch films, began broadcasting it after hearing it in Lynch's film Wild at Heart (1990). The song quickly became an American top 10 hit in March 1991, reaching No. 6 on the Billboard Hot 100. It also became a No. 1 hit in Belgium and reached the top 10 in several other countries. Its accompanying music video, directed by Herb Ritts and filmed in Hawaii featuring Helena Christensen, won two awards at the 1991 MTV Video Music Awards.

"Wicked Game" has been covered by a wide variety of musicians and has been featured in numerous films, television series, and commercials, to the point that Dazed magazine questioned whether it might be the most influential love song in modern music. It subsequently received retrospective critical acclaim, being listed in the 2010 book 1001 Songs You Must Hear Before You Die and the updated edition of the 1989 book The Heart of Rock & Soul: The 1001 Greatest Singles Ever Made.

== Composition ==
The song is in B Dorian, performed in what AllMusic describes as a "brooding, sorrowfully conflicted" tone.

Although it is often interpreted as a ballad about unrequited love, Chris Isaak has said that the song was inspired by a telephone call from a woman offering to arrange a hook up, and is about "what happens when you have a strong attraction to people that aren't necessarily good for you". It was written shortly after the call.

During the sessions for Isaak's third album Heart Shaped World, many different versions and arrangements of the song were made before the final version was completed. James Calvin Wilsey wrote and played the distinctive guitar lead using a Fender Stratocaster's whammy bar; both the bassline and drums were sampled from previous recordings of the song and looped.

== Critical reception ==
The Aberdeen Evening Express extolled the "haunting strains" of "Wicked Game." Grant Walters of Albumism praised the song as a "pristine union of Isaak's aching vocal and the desolate wail of James Calvin Wilsey's '65 Stratocaster." He added, "Underneath, the brushed drum loop, simple bass line, and muted background vocals create a simmering atmospheric buzz." Steve Huey of AllMusic described it as a "shimmering," "spare," "smoky," and "moody masterpiece." Larry Flick from Billboard magazine named it a "delicious treat." Alaister Moughan from Dazed wrote, "Some songs are masterpieces, some represent moments in time, and others are simply good jams. Chris Isaak's 'Wicked Game' is all three." Joe Rhodes from Entertainment Weekly stated that this is "perhaps the album's darkest mood piece," noting its "otherworldly" opening guitar line. Pan-European magazine Music & Media described it as a "laid-back C&W tinged song featuring Isaak's Orbison-esque vocals." Duncan Holland from Music Week felt its "dexterity and panache is something rarely heard. The touches of Roy Orbison only make it stronger and given the right airplay, Isaak should score a significant, if unpredictable hit." A reviewer from Sunday Life complimented it as a "brooding ballad, image-laden, and worthy of Roy Orbison in his heyday."

== Music videos ==
There are two different music videos for this song. The more well-known video was directed by Herb Ritts and shot in Hawaii at the short-lived Kamoamoa Beach in Hawaii Volcanoes National Park on the Big Island. The newly-formed black-sand beach was created from lava from Kilauea volcano flowing into the ocean about a mile away. The beach was covered by lava not long after the video was shot. The video features supermodel Helena Christensen rolling and frolicking on the beach with Isaak. It was mostly filmed in black and white. Christensen is topless through most of the video, although her nudity is concealed by camera angles. In the middle of the video, Christensen is seen only in her black lace bra and panty; other times, she wears only a men's white brief. The video achieved heavy rotation on MTV and MTV Europe in February 1991, winning the MTV Video Music Awards for Best Male Video and Best Cinematography at the 1991 MTV Video Music Awards. It was ranked number 13 on VH1's "100 Greatest Videos", number 3 on NME’s “Greatest Music Videos of all time”, number four on VH1's "50 Sexiest Video Moments", number 73 on Rolling Stone magazine's "The 100 Top Music Videos", number one on Rolling Stone magazine's "The 30 Sexiest Music Videos of All Time", and number one on Fuse's "40 Sexiest Videos" in 2010.

The first version of the video was commissioned for the Wild at Heart soundtrack and was directed by David Lynch. It intersperses clips from the film, which stars Laura Dern and Nicolas Cage as Lula Pace Fortune and Sailor Ripley, with black-and-white footage of Isaak and his band performing the song. This video won the MTV Video Music Award for Best Video from a Film.

== Track listings ==
- US 7-inch and cassette single

A. "Wicked Game" (edit) – 4:06
B. "Wicked Game" (instrumental) – 4:48

- European 7-inch single (1989)

A. "Wicked Game" – 4:46
B. "Don't Make Me Dream About You" – 3:30

- UK 7-inch and cassette single

A. "Wicked Game"
B. "Cool Cat Walk" (by Angelo Badalamenti)

- UK 12-inch and CD single
1. "Wicked Game"
2. "Cool Cat Walk" (by Badalamenti)
3. "Dark Spanish Symphony" (by Badalamenti; string version)
- French CD single
1. "Wicked Game" – 4:46
2. "Don't Make Me Dream About You" – 3:30
3. "Wicked Game" (instrumental) – 4:48
- French cassette single
1. "Wicked Game" – 4:46
2. "Don't Make Me Dream About You" – 3:30

== Personnel ==
- Chris Isaak – vocals, acoustic guitar
- James Calvin Wilsey – electric guitar, backing vocals
- Rowland Salley – bass guitar, backing vocals
- Kenney Dale Johnson – drums, backing vocals
- Frank Martin – keyboards

== Charts ==
=== Weekly charts ===
Chart (1990–1991)	Peak position
Australia (ARIA)	15
Belgium (Ultratop 50 Flanders)	1
Canada Top Singles (RPM)	3
Canada Adult Contemporary (RPM)	6
Europe (Eurochart Hot 100)	18
Europe (European Hit Radio)	17
Finland (Suomen virallinen lista)	8
France (SNEP)	33
Germany (GfK)	9
Ireland (IRMA)	10
Luxembourg (Radio Luxembourg)	7
Netherlands (Dutch Top 40)	5
Netherlands (Single Top 100)	5
New Zealand (Recorded Music NZ)	7
Sweden (Sverigetopplistan)	3
UK Singles (Official Charts)	10
US Billboard Hot 100	6
US Adult Contemporary (Billboard)	12
US Alternative Airplay (Billboard)	2
US Mainstream Rock Airplay (Billboard)	10
US Cash Box Top 100	16

Chart (2025–2026)	Peak position
Estonia Airplay (TopHit)	94
Global 200 (Billboard)	142
Greece International (IFPI)	11
Lithuania (AGATA)	51
Portugal (AFP)	137

=== Year-end charts ===
Chart (1991)	Position
Australia (ARIA)	83
Belgium (Ultratop)	18
Canada Top Singles (RPM)	22
Canada Adult Contemporary (RPM)	22
Europe (Eurochart Hot 100)	72
Germany (Media Control)	39
Netherlands (Dutch Top 40)	30
Netherlands (Single Top 100)	40
Sweden (Topplistan)	18
US Billboard Hot 100	79
US Modern Rock Tracks (Billboard)	25

== Certifications ==
Region	Certification	Certified units/sales
Denmark (IFPI Danmark)	Platinum	90,000^{‡}
Germany (BVMI)	Gold	300,000^{‡}
Italy (FIMI)	Platinum	100,000^{‡}
New Zealand (RMNZ)	3× Platinum	90,000^{‡}
Portugal (AFP)	Platinum	25,000^{‡}
Spain (Promusicae)	Platinum	60,000^{‡}
United Kingdom (BPI)	2× Platinum	1,200,000^{‡}
United States (RIAA)	Gold	500,000^{^}
Streaming
Greece (IFPI Greece)	3× Platinum	6,000,000^{†}
^{^} Shipments figures based on certification alone.^{‡} Sales+streaming figures based on certification alone.^{†} Streaming-only figures based on certification alone.

== Release history ==
Region	Date	Format(s)	Label(s)	Ref.
Germany	July 14, 1989	7-inch vinyl	Reprise	
Australia	November 5, 1990	7-inch vinyl; cassette	London	
United Kingdom	November 12, 1990	7-inch vinyl; 12-inch vinyl; CD; cassette	London	

== Other versions ==
=== HIM ===
"Wicked Game"

Single by HIM

from the album Greatest Lovesongs Vol. 666 and Razorblade Romance (UK and US releases)
- Released: September 28, 1998
- Genre: Gothic metal
- Length: 3:54
- Label: BMG

HIM singles chronology
"Your Sweet Six Six Six" (1998)	"Wicked Game" (1998)	"Join Me in Death" (1999)

The Finnish Gothic rock band HIM remade the song, first using it in their demo This Is Only the Beginning, then on their 1996 EP 666 Ways to Love: Prologue, followed by another recording of it on their first album Greatest Lovesongs Vol. 666 in 1997, and again on the British and American versions of their second album Razorblade Romance in 2000. The last recording they made of it then reappeared on their compilation album And Love Said No: The Greatest Hits 1997–2004. "Wicked Game" became the band's breakthrough song in their native Finland. Their version appeared in "Solitude", a 2005 season 5 episode of Smallville.

==== Track listings ====
- German release
1. "Wicked Game" – 3:54
2. "For You" – 4:00
3. "Our Diabolical Rapture" – 5:20
4. "Wicked Game" (666 Remix) – 3:58
- Finnish release
1. "Wicked Game"
2. "For You"
- 2000 UK release
1. "Wicked Game" – 3:36
2. "When Love and Death Embrace" (Amnt Mix) – 3:34
3. "The Heartless" (Serdlidlim Mix) – 3:11
- 2000 Swedish release
1. "Wicked Game" 2000
2. "When Love and Death Embrace" (Amnt Mix) – 3:34

=== Parra for Cuva ===
"Wicked Games"

Single by Parra for Cuva featuring Anna Naklab
- Released: October 14, 2013
- Recorded: 2013
- Length: 3:15
- Label: Spinnin' Deep

Parra for Cuva singles chronology
"Luhya" (2013)	"Wicked Games" (2013)	"Sacred Feathers" (2016)

Anna Naklab singles chronology
"Something Near" (2013)	"Wicked Games" (2013)	"Fading Nights"

In 2013, German house producer Parra for Cuva released a cover version that featured Anna Naklab. The single was re-titled as "Wicked Games" in plural. It was first released on Beatport worldwide as a digital download in August 2013, then a mainstream release as a digital download in France in October 2013 and in Germany on February 14, 2014. The song has charted in Australia, France, Belgium, the United Kingdom and the Netherlands.

==== Track listing ====
1. "Wicked Games" (radio edit) – 3:15
2. "Wicked Games" (original mix) – 5:58

==== Charts ====
===== Weekly charts =====
Chart (2013–2014)	Peak position
Australia (ARIA)	14
Belgium (Ultratop 50 Flanders)	15
Belgium (Ultratop 50 Wallonia)	21
France (SNEP)	72
Germany (GfK)	89
Hungary (Rádiós Top 40)	30
Ireland (IRMA)	54
Netherlands (Dutch Top 40)	5
Netherlands (Dutch Top 40)	6
Scottish Singles Sales (Official Charts)	4
UK Dance (Official Charts)	1
UK Singles (Official Charts)	6

===== Year-end charts =====
Chart (2013)	Position
Netherlands (Dutch Top 40)	50
Netherlands (Single Top 100)	45

Chart (2014)	Position
Netherlands (Dutch Top 40)	82

==== Certifications ====
Region	Certification	Certified units/sales
Australia (ARIA)	Platinum	70,000^{‡}
United Kingdom (BPI)	Platinum	600,000^{‡}
^{‡} Sales+streaming figures based on certification alone.

=== Stone Sour ===
On June 26, 2007, Stone Sour released an acoustic cover of the song on the special edition version of the album Come What(ever) May. It was certified Gold by both the ARIA in 2024 and Recorded Music NZ in 2021.

=== Phillip Phillips ===
Phillip Phillips, winner of the eleventh season of American Idol, included a cover of "Wicked Game" in the deluxe edition of his 2012 debut album, The World from the Side of the Moon.

=== James Vincent McMorrow ===
Irish musician James Vincent McMorrow released a cover of "Wicked Game" as part of his EP We Don't Eat in 2012, taken from a live recording of his performance of the song at Killkenny Arts Festival, Ireland 2011. It was later used in the first official full-length trailer for the sixth season of HBO's Game of Thrones.

=== La Ley ===
Chilean rock band La Ley released "Sin Ti" in 2014, a Spanish-language cover of "Wicked Game" featuring original lyrics by front-man Beto Cuevas. The lyrics phonetically mirror the English original, while giving the song a new meaning; for example the chorus "No I, don't want to fall in love" is replaced with "No hay, labios para besar; no hay, estrallas en el cielo."

=== Boy & Bear ===
Australian indie folk band Boy & Bear recorded a cover of this song which was released as a single on February 14, 2020 and was later included on their album Boy & Bear at Golden Retriever Studio. It was certified Gold by ARIA in 2023.

=== Lingua Ignota ===
American experimental musician Lingua Ignota released a cover of the song as a single on August 7, 2020. It includes a sample of Krzysztof Penderecki's Threnody to the Victims of Hiroshima.

=== Marcus & Martinus ===
In 2022, Norwegian dance-pop duo Marcus & Martinus released their version after performing it on season 2 of Masked Singer Sverige. The song was later included on their 2024 album Unforgettable.

=== Tenacious D ===
On June 1, 2023, American comedy rock duo Tenacious D released a cover of the song as a single, with an accompanying music video.

=== Girls Aloud ===
In 2024, English-Irish girl group Girls Aloud released a cover of "Wicked Game" as part of a 20th anniversary reissue of their 2004 studio album What Will The Neighbours Say? While the track was originally intended to serve as a lead single for their 2005 studio album Chemistry, it was scrapped in favor of the single "Long Hot Summer" and eventually excluded from the album upon its release.

Along with the two other songs released as part of the album's reissue, "Disco Bunny" and "Baby When You Go", the track is notable as the first posthumous release of material containing vocals from Girls Aloud member Sarah Harding, who died of breast cancer in 2021.

=== Oceans of Slumber ===
In 2024, Texan heavy-metal band Oceans of Slumber released a cover of "Wicked Game" on their album Where Gods Fear to Speak.

=== Trevor Something ===
In 2024, American synthwave musician Trevor Something performed a darkwave rendition of the song for the lead track of his covers album, Archetypes.

=== The Last Dinner Party ===
Also in 2024, British art-rock band The Last Dinner Party released a live cover of the song as part of the expanded release of its debut album Prelude to Ecstasy: Acoustics and Covers. The band also performed the song live for SiriusXM.

=== Social Distortion ===
In 2026, Social Distortion released a cover version of the song on their studio album Born To Kill. They had been performing it as part of their live set for several years.
