= Rolling Stone's 100 Greatest Songwriters of All Time =

2015 Rolling Stone feature

"The 100 Greatest Songwriters of All Time" is a feature published by the American magazine Rolling Stone in August 2015. The list presented was compiled based on the magazine's music critics, and unlike previous lists the votes came entirely from the magazine's staff. It predominantly features American and English songwriters of the rock era.

== Top 10 songwriters of all time ==
Rank	Image	Name	Lifetime	First single written
1		Bob Dylan	May 24, 1941 – present	"Mixed-Up Confusion" (1962), performed by himself
2		Paul McCartney	June 18, 1942 – present	"Love Me Do"/"P.S. I Love You" (1962), performed by the Beatles
3		John Lennon	October 9, 1940 – December 8, 1980	"Love Me Do"/"P.S. I Love You" (1962), performed by the Beatles
4		Chuck Berry	October 18, 1926 – March 18, 2017	"Maybellene" (1955), performed by himself
5		Smokey Robinson	February 19, 1940 – present	"Got a Job" (1958), performed by the Miracles
6		Mick Jagger / Keith Richards	July 26, 1943 – present / December 18, 1943 – present	"Tell Me" (1964), performed by the Rolling Stones
7		Carole King / Gerry Goffin	February 9, 1942 – present / February 11, 1939 – June 19, 2014	"Will You Love Me Tomorrow" (1960), performed by the Shirelles
8		Paul Simon	October 13, 1941 – present	"Hey Schoolgirl" (1957), performed by Simon & Garfunkel (then known as Tom & Jerry)
9		Joni Mitchell	November 7, 1943 – present	"Urge For Going" (1966), performed by Tom Rush
10		Stevie Wonder	May 13, 1950 – present	"Kiss Me Baby" (1968), performed by himself

== Reception ==
The list received mixed response from fellow publications. Writing for Flavorwire, Judy Berman criticized the selection of the songwriters, saying "Predictably, it's over 70% white and features only nine solo female songwriters (five other women are included as part of mixed-gender writing teams). Classic rock is overrepresented; every other genre and subgenre of popular music is underrepresented." Geeta Dayal from The Guardian accused the list's sponsorship by Apple Music of determining the selection. Tom Moon wrote for NPR, "This list represents another trip through the hagiographic, hermetically sealed rock hall of fame, with the same stars you've been reading about in Rolling Stone since the dinosaur age." The Daily Telegraph culture editor Martin Chilton responded with a list of 100 best songwriters neglected by Rolling Stone, including Cole Porter, Townes Van Zandt, Ewan MacColl, Kate Bush, and Ray Charles.

Jacqueline Cutler from New York Daily News agreed with the magazine for ranking Bob Dylan as the top songwriter. Jon Bream from Minnesota-based newspaper Star Tribune praised the inclusion of songwriters from Minnesota and said that Dylan as a number-one songwriter is not surprising. Lori Melton from ticketing company AXS wrote that the list "reads like an iconic student body in a songwriting master class" and complimented the inclusion of female songwriters Carole King, Joni Mitchell, Dolly Parton, Stevie Nicks, Madonna, Chrissie Hynde, Loretta Lynn, Lucinda Williams, and Björk, as well as Taylor Swift, who is the youngest person on the list.

== See also ==
- List of best-selling music artists
- The 100 Greatest Artists of All Time, also from Rolling Stone magazine
- The 200 Greatest Singers of All Time, also from Rolling Stone magazine
- The 500 Greatest Albums of All Time, also from Rolling Stone magazine
- The 500 Greatest Songs of All Time, also from Rolling Stone magazine
- The 100 Greatest Music Videos of All Time, also from Rolling Stone magazine
