= Kyson =

Australian singer, songwriter, and producer

- Birth name: Jian Liew
- Born: Adelaide, Australia
- Origin: Berlin, Germany
- Genres: Electronica
- Occupations: Singer; songwriter; record producer
- Instruments: Guitar; synthesizers; vocals
- Years active: 2011–present
- Website: kyson-music.com

Jian Liew, known professionally as Kyson, is an Australian-born record producer, composer, and multidisciplinary artist. He is known for his textured and atmospheric production style, combining electronic, acoustic, and experimental music.

As Kyson, he has released several solo albums, and has worked as a producer and songwriter for artists such as Drake, Chlöe, and Alice Phoebe Lou, as well as contributing to interdisciplinary projects in sound and installation art. In 2023, he was nominated for a Grammy Award for his co-production work on “More M’s” from Drake and 21 Savage's album Her Loss.

== Early life ==
Liew was born in Adelaide, Australia. He later moved to Sydney, Australia where he went on to study a degree in audio engineering. After graduating, he spent the next several years in Berlin working as a musician and sound artist under the name Kyson and various other monikers.

== Career ==
In 2012, Kyson gained attention for his remix of Bon Iver's "Holocene" on 4AD Records. On 29 October 2012 Liew released his "Blackstone EP" on Moodgadget Recordings. He was signed by Friends of Friends Records and released his first studio album The Water's Way.

In 2014, Liew collaborated with Detroit-based musician Shigeto on the track "Water Collides".

In 2015, Kyson, alongside Italian musician and producer Matteo Pavesi, co-produced the debut album of singer-songwriter Alice Phoebe Lou, which was released on 13 May 2016. The same year, Liew founded the art and music collective Average Negative with musical collaborator Chris Hill.

In April 2016, Liew released his second album, A Book of Flying, with Friends of Friends Recordings.

In 2017, he collaborated with Australian artist Amber Cronin to create the spatial installation "Sawaru" at the Nexus Gallery in Adelaide, Australia.

In 2018, Kyson released a series of AA singles, "Every High / Clear Air" and "Have My Back / Forest Green", in collaboration with B3SCI Records and Majestic Casual Records. The two releases were also part of a limited edition white vinyl record, with artwork by B.D. Graft. Pitchfork has described Liew's style as, "combin[ing] soft touches of electronic keys and rickety, pinprick rhythms, with his half-whispered lyrics and drifting melodies wrapped in sheets of textural field recordings." Liew has also been described as having an, "enigmatic sound, a blend of indie, acoustic and electronic music."

In 2020, Kyson released his third studio album, Kyson, through B3SCI Records. The album adopted a more minimal, songwriting-oriented style and was supported by a limited vinyl release.

In 2021, Kyson worked with German electronic producer Parra for Cuva and British guitarist Beau Diako on the track "Ordel," which appeared on Parra for Cuva's album Juno. That year, Kyson’s music was included in the Hermès Spring/Summer 2022 menswear runway show designed by Véronique Nichanian, presented during Paris Fashion Week.

In 2022, Kyson independently released Lucky Notes, a 14-track album composed and produced in Berlin, Germany. The project continued his exploration of analog instrumentation and vocal-forward production and was distributed digitally and on cassette through B3SCI Records.

Kyson co-produced the track "More M's" on Her Loss, the collaborative album by Drake and 21 Savage. The album debuted at number one on the Billboard 200, and Her Loss was later nominated for a Grammy Award in 2023, earning Kyson his first nomination as a producer.

In 2023, Kyson contributed production to In Pieces, the debut solo album by Chlöe Bailey, released by Columbia Records.
