= Rolling Stone's 200 Greatest Singers of All Time =

2008 American magazine feature

"The 100 Greatest Singers of All Time" is a feature published by American magazine Rolling Stone in 2008. The list presented was compiled by a panel of 179 musicians. It was updated in 2023, and upgraded as "The 200 Greatest Singers of All Time" list. The 2023 list was compiled by the magazine's staff and key contributors. American singer Aretha Franklin topped the list both times.

When publishing the updated list in 2023, Rolling Stone noted that "this is the Greatest Singers list, not Greatest Voices list. Talent is impressive; genius is transcendent".

== 2008 list ==
=== Top 10 singers ===
Rank	Image	Name	Lifetime
1		Aretha Franklin	March 25, 1942 – August 16, 2018
2		Ray Charles	September 23, 1930 – June 10, 2004
3		Elvis Presley	January 8, 1935 – August 16, 1977
4		Sam Cooke	January 22, 1931 – December 11, 1964
5		John Lennon	October 9, 1940 – December 8, 1980
6		Marvin Gaye	April 2, 1939 – April 1, 1984
7		Bob Dylan	May 24, 1941 – present
8		Otis Redding	September 9, 1941 – December 10, 1967
9		Stevie Wonder	May 13, 1950 – present
10		James Brown	May 3, 1933 – December 25, 2006

== 2023 list ==
=== Top 10 singers ===
Rank	Image	Name	Lifetime
1		Aretha Franklin	March 25, 1942 – August 16, 2018
2		Whitney Houston	August 9, 1963 – February 11, 2012
3		Sam Cooke	January 22, 1931 – December 11, 1964
4		Billie Holiday	April 7, 1915 – July 17, 1959
5		Mariah Carey	March 27, 1969 – present
6		Ray Charles	September 23, 1930 – June 10, 2004
7		Stevie Wonder	May 13, 1950 – present
8		Beyoncé	September 4, 1981 – present
9		Otis Redding	September 9, 1941 – December 10, 1967
10		Al Green	April 13, 1946 – present

=== Criticism ===
The omissions of singers Dionne Warwick, Celine Dion, Jennifer Hudson, Justin Bieber, Bill Withers, and Nat King Cole as well as the placement of American singer Michael Jackson, who placed 86th, were criticized. Fans of Celine Dion protested. Singer Chaka Khan, who was ranked 29th on the list, called Rolling Stone editors "children of Helen Keller" and publicly expressed her outrage about being placed lower than Mary J. Blige and Mariah Carey. She later apologized for her comments. Musician Van Morrison, who placed 37th, also criticized the list, claiming that singers Joan Baez, Solomon Burke and Bobby Bland should have all ranked in the top twenty.

== See also ==
- List of best-selling music artists
- The 100 Greatest Artists of All Time
- The 100 Greatest Songwriters of All Time
- The 500 Greatest Albums of All Time
- The 500 Greatest Songs of All Time
- The 100 Greatest Music Videos of All Time
