= Ryan Davis (musician) =

German musician and graphic designer

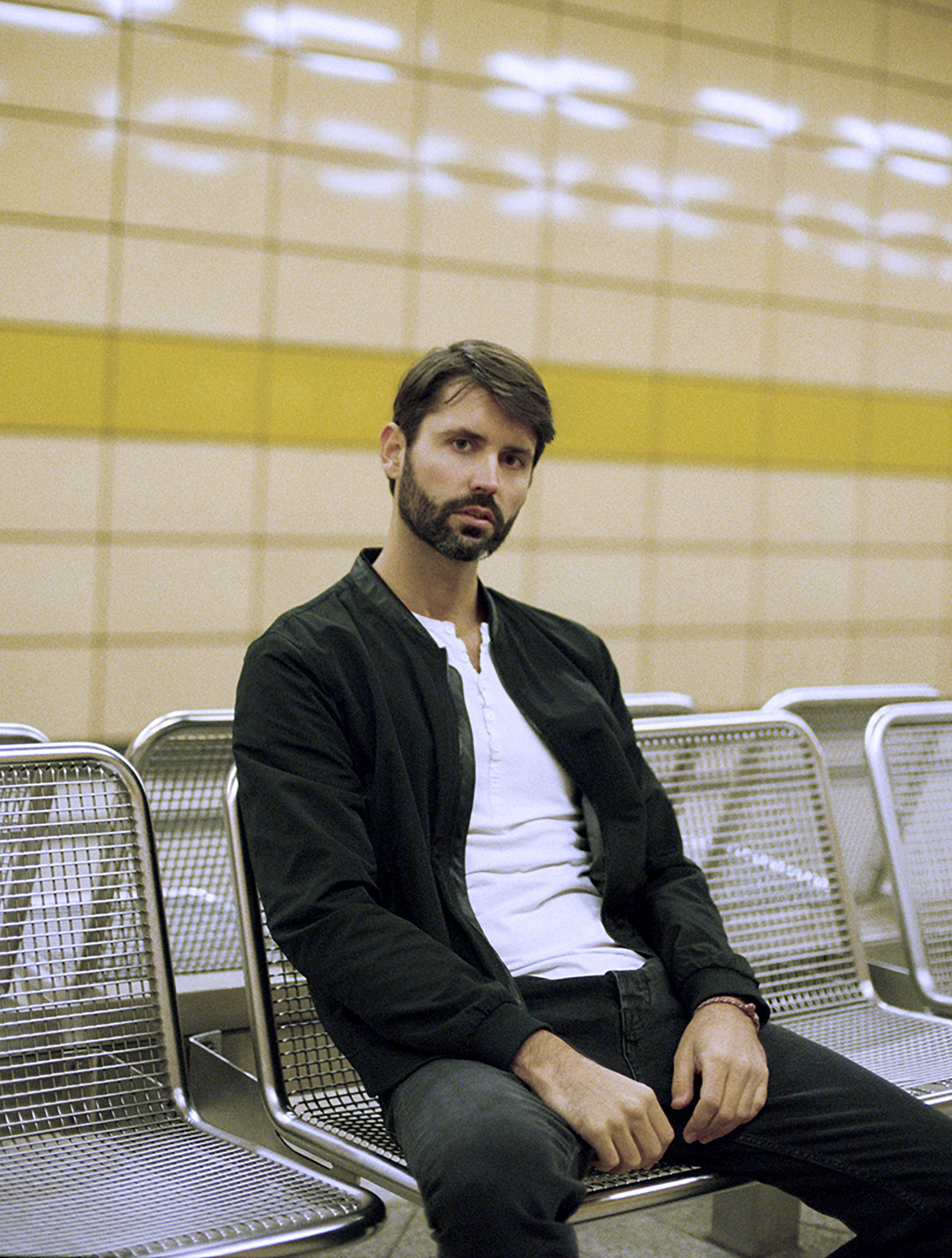
Official press photo

Ryan Davis (born Sebastian Waack; January 30, 1983) is a German record producer, live act, DJ and graphic designer living in Berlin.

== Life ==
Raised in the 90s-era of East Germany Davis got in contact with the hip-hop and techno scene which both where omnipresent in Germany at the time. The DJ was a central figure in this movement and inspired Davis to become a DJ himself and to create his first own electronic productions. Due to his classical guitar education he already gained foreknowledge for melodic compositions which he then could incorporate in his productions.

== Career ==
To this day the emphasis on melody is a trademark of Davis productions. In 2012 he published his first LP 'Particles of Bliss' on the record label Traumschallplatten. The increasing support of well-known DJs and producers of the electronic scene such as Aphex Twin at the Day & Night Festival 2017, Kiasmos, Dominik Eulberg or Apparat but also from bands like Depeche Mode - who played his music as opening act at the ‘Sound of the Universe‘ tour - emphasizes Davis standing and range in the musical landscape. For approximately 8 years he is touring worldwide and played his songs amongst others in Japan, Africa, Canada, Australia, India, Europe and Russia. Davis sees himself as a nomad who is drawn to labels that are open for his musical visions. Therefore, he is currently working with the British label Anjunadeep. Further releases on avant-garde labels such as Erased Tapes or Injazero show the constant development and diversifification of Davis' spectrum.

Besides his work as an artist Davis runs the record labels Klangwelt Records and Back Home which he formed in 2008 and 2009.

== Discography (selection) ==
=== LPs ===
- 2012: Particles of Bliss (Traumschallplatten)

=== Singles & EPs ===
- 2018: Home EP (Anjunadeep)
- 2018: Obsidian (Anjunadeep)
- 2018: Alow (Anjunadeep)
- 2018: Ryan Davis & Matthias Meyer - Love Letters From Sicily (Watergate)
- 2017: Jima (Parquet)
- 2017: Aeons (Mango Alley)
- 2017: Ryan Davis & Microtrauma - Traces (Soulful Techno)
- 2016: Ryan Davis & Microtrauma - Recurrence (Bedrock)
- 2016: From Within EP (Anjunadeep)
- 2015: Ryan Davis & Microtrauma - Synthesis EP (Traumschallplatten)
- 2015: Ryan Davis feat. LMNSKT - Kope/Hadron EP (Klangwelt)
- 2013: State Of Mind EP (Traumschallplatten)
- 2013: Ryan Davis & Applescal - Creatures EP (Atomnation & Back Home)
- 2013: Ryan Davis & Electric Resque - A Walk EP (Traumschallplatten)
- 2013: Ryan Davis & Bastard Beat - Coincide EP (Back Home)
- 2013: Ryan Davis & Pan/Tone - Two Armed Bandits EP (Areal)
- 2012: Ryan Davis & Undo - Destino EP (Factor City)
- 2012: Satellite (Bedrock)
- 2012: Windmills EP (Areal)
- 2011: Light & Shadow EP (Traumschallplatten)
- 2011: My White Zebra EP (Wunderbar)
- 2011: Routes of Life EP (Traumschallplatten)
- 2010: Asteroids EP (Nature Sonoris)
- 2010: The Wolve EP (IRM)
- 2010: Fawna EP (Proton)
- 2010: Cocoon EP
- 2010: In The Mirrors (Klangwelt)
- 2010: The Modern Parables EP (Manual)
- 2009: Perlentaucher EP (IRM)
- 2009: Orchidee (Manual)
- 2009: Changing Skies EP (Absolutive)
- 2009: Pocket Universe EP (Factor City)
- 2009: Zodiac (Archipel)
- 2009: Solid City
- 2009: Posters & Cakes EP (Back Home)
- 2008: Zyrial Soundfood EP (Manual)
- 2008: Clouds Passing By EP (Proton)
- 2008: Wide Open Space (Klanggymnastik)
- 2007: Neotron EP (Piemont)
- 2007: Higher (Klanggymnastik)
- 2007: Seabreeze (Klanggymnastik)
- 2006: Transformer EP (Klanggymnastik)

=== Remixes ===
- 2018: Re:deep - Fragile (Ryan Davis Reconstruct) / Vordergrundmusik
- 2018: Lycoriscoris - Stella (Ryan Davis Rethink) / Anjunadeep
- 2017: Steve Gibbs - Adrift (Ryan Davis Remix) / Injazero
- 2017: Kyson - You (Ryan Davis Revision) / Anjunadeep
- 2017: Ryan Davis & Microtrauma - Calendula (Ryan Davis Redesign) / Traumschallplatten
- 2017: Aparde - Elias (Ryan Davis Re:Imagination) / Lenient Tales
- 2017: Olafur Arnalds & Nils Frahm - 00:26 (Ryan Davis Rethink) / Erased Tapes
- 2016: Two People - If We Have Time (Ryan Davis Timeless Edit) / Liberation Music
- 2016: Revell - Absurdum (Ryan Davis Subconscious Mind Rework) / Clouds Above
- 2016: Josia Loos & Hey Joe - Scherbenwelt ( Ryan Davis Remix) / Blu Fin
- 2015: Problem Makers - Lacerta (Ryan Davis Remix) / No Style Is Style
- 2015: Oovation - Devotion (Ryan Davis Re-Visit) / Univack
- 2015: Olaf Stuut - Summate (Ryan Davis Rethink) / Morgen.am
- 2015: Boss Axis - Even Temper (Ryan Davis Rework) / Parquet
- 2014: Olafur Arnalds - Only The Winds (Ryan Davis´ A Letter From Far Away Variation) / Anjunadeep
- 2014: Bob Barker - Rondel (Ryan Davis Pandora Reshape) /Catch
- 2014: Luis Junior - Alibi (Ryan Davis Remix) / Mooseekaa
- 2014: Darin Epsilon - Shine The Light (Ryan Davis Reconstruct) / Hope
- 2013: Andrew Bayer - Gaffs Eulogy (Ryan Davis Interpretation) / Anjunadeep
- 2013: Electric Rescue - The Rave Child (Ryan Davis Cinematic Rebuild) / Bedrock
- 2012: Micromattic - Uncanny (Ryan Davis Remix) / Absolutive
- 2011: Dominik Eulberg - Täuschungsblume (Ryan Davis Narciss Render) /Traumschallplatten
- 2011: Sasha - Cut Me Down (Ryan Davis Twin Break Edit) / Last Night On Earth
- 2011: Fyed Roton - Araana (Ryan Davis Rough Cut) / Electrogravity
- 2011: Russian Linesman - I am Narcassist (Ryan Davis Leaves Of Autumn Remix) / Elefant
- 2011: Pan/Tone - Rescue Me (Ryan Davis Rough Cut) / Areal
- 2011: Dibby Dougherty & David Young - Tiger Forest (Ryan Davis Rework) / Bedrock
- 2011: Pig & Dan - Tears Of A Clown (Ryan Davis Interpretation) / Techno Therapy
- 2011: Microtrauma - Saturation (Ryan Davis Remix) / Traumschallplatten
- 2011: Espen & Elusive - Albatross Confessions (Ryan Davis Rework) / Mango Alley
- 2011: Pole Folder - Indigo (Ryan Davis Remix) / Reworck
- 2011: Mango & Kazusa - Asphalt Lines (Ryan Davis Interpretation)
- 2011: Espen & Elusive - Albatross Confessions (Ryan Davis Rework) / Mango Alley
- 2010: Max Cooper - Enveloped (Ryan Davis Reconstruct Remix) / Traumschallplatten
- 2010: Andre Sobota - Red Dust (Ryan Davis Sub Dub Remix) / Proton
- 2010: Sinner Dc - Digital Dust (Ryan Davis Epic Mix) / Ai
- 2009: Groj - Edlothia (Ryan Davis Mix) / Klangwelt
- 2009: Damabiah - Sur Les Genoux D L´Automne (Ryan Davis Remix) / Natura Sonoris
- 2009: Electric Rescue - Vetetroi (Ryan Davis From Far Away Re-Edit) / Back Home
- 2009: Spada - Nuvolette (Alt Fenster & Ryan Davis Waves Of Fate Edit) / Back Home
- 2008: Moonbeam - Nature (Ryan Davis Firefly Aerobics/ Glowfly Lapdance) / Proton
- 2008: Spada - Irreversible (Ryan Davis Entedeckungen Fernab Vom Weg Tool) / Back Home
