= Human (Max Cooper album) =

Studio album by Max Cooper
- Released: 10 March 2014
- Recorded: 2012–2013
- Genre: Techno, ambient
- Length: 57:42
- Label: FIELDS
- Producer: Max Cooper

Professional ratings
Review scores
Source	Rating
Resident Advisor	3/5

Human is the debut studio album released by Northern Irish musician Max Cooper on 10 March 2014 through Fields Records. It features vocal contributions by Kathrin deBoer and Braids.

== Track listing ==
All tracks are written by Max Cooper

No.	Title	Length
1.	"Woven Ancestry"	4:21
2.	"Adrift" (feat. Kathrin deBoer)	7:08
3.	"Automaton" (feat. Braids)	4:23
4.	"Supine"	6:39
5.	"Seething"	5:53
6.	"Numb" (feat. Kathrin deBoer)	5:21
7.	"Impacts"	4:12
8.	"Empyrean"	3:53
9.	"Apparitions"	5:21
10.	"Potency"	6:32
11.	"Awakening"	3:59
Total length:		57:42

== Personnel ==
- Max Cooper – engineering and production
- Andy Ramsay – engineering
- Rashad Becker – mastering
- Ben Slater – artwork
