= Rolling Stone's 100 Greatest Artists of All Time =

List of musicians

"The 100 Greatest Artists of All Time" was a special issue published by Rolling Stone in two parts in 2004 and 2005, and later updated in 2011. The list presented was compiled based on input from musicians, writers, and industry figures and is focused on the rock & roll era and genre.

The publication features comments that several musicians wrote about their colleagues, including Elvis Costello on the Beatles, Janet Jackson on Tina Turner, and others.

Since its publication, the list has been frequently cited by many specialized and generalist publications.

== Background ==
The list was published in two issues in 2004 and 2005, and later updated in 2011. It was selected based on the choices of a panel of 55 musicians, writers, and industry figures. As the editors explain, the artists were selected by "their peers", and the list aims to be "a broad survey of rock history", encompassing rock and roll, blues, hard rock, heavy metal, indie rock, rap and contemporary pop.

== List statistics ==
In both versions of the list, the top three positions are held by the Beatles, Bob Dylan, and Elvis Presley; rounding out the top ten were (in descending order): the Rolling Stones, Chuck Berry, Jimi Hendrix, James Brown, Little Richard, Aretha Franklin, and Ray Charles.

In 2011, Rolling Stone published a revised edition of the list, with position changes from the 27th position onward. The position of 68 artists was unchanged, and 20 had fewer than two rank changes. The only significant position change was Carl Perkins, who dropped 30 ranks in the 2011 listing. The updated list also featured artists not present in the original, including Pink Floyd #51, Queen #52, Metallica #61, Creedence Clearwater Revival #82, Jay-Z #88, Tom Petty #91, R.E.M. #97, and Talking Heads #100.

In the 2011 list, several artists were removed from the greatest 100, including Louis Jordan #59, Etta James #62, N.W.A #83, Miles Davis #88, Ricky Nelson #91, Martha & The Vandellas #96, Roxy Music #98, and Lee "Scratch" Perry #100.

The list consists primarily of American or British artists who sold well in America, as well as the following: AC/DC (Australian, with several British-born members), the Band (Canada/US), Bob Marley (Jamaica), Joni Mitchell (Canada), Lee "Scratch" Perry (Jamaica; only in the 2005 list), Carlos Santana (Mexican by birth, naturalized American), U2 (Ireland, with two British-born members), and Neil Young (Canada).

Most artists on the list were active in the 1960s and 1970s.

Out of both lists, Dr. Dre (as a solo artist) and Lee “Scratch” Perry are the only ones not to be inducted into the Rock ‘n’ Roll Hall of Fame.

== See also ==
- List of best-selling music artists
- The 200 Greatest Singers of All Time, also from Rolling Stone magazine
- The 100 Greatest Songwriters of All Time, also from Rolling Stone magazine
- The 500 Greatest Albums of All Time, also from Rolling Stone magazine
- The 500 Greatest Songs of All Time, also from Rolling Stone magazine
- The 100 Greatest Music Videos of All Time, also from Rolling Stone magazine
