= Apricity =

Apricity is a term for the warmth of the sun in winter.

Apricity may also refer to:

== Music ==
- Apricity (Syd Arthur album), a 2016 album by Syd Arthur
- Apricity (Harrison album), a 2018 album by Harrison
- Apricity (Aukai album), a 2022 album by Aukai
- Apricity, a track on the 2021 album Salute: A New Hope by AB6IX
- Apricity, a composition for string quartet and percussion by Kerensa Briggs

== Film ==
- Apricity, a 2016 short film starring Ashley Bratcher
- Apricity, a 2019 film by Nathaniel Dorsky
- Apricity, a 2022 pornographic film nominated for the 40th AVN Awards

== Other ==
- Apricity, a restaurant in London owned by Chantelle Nicholson
- Apricity, a femtech company offering fertility services for women
- Apricity Magazine, a college magazine which won the 2020 National Pacemaker Awards
- "Apricity machine", a device in a 2018 science fiction novel by Katie Williams
