= Dark Star (film) =

1974 film by John Carpenter

- Theatrical release poster
- Directed by: John Carpenter
- Written by: John Carpenter; Dan O'Bannon
- Produced by: John Carpenter
- Starring: Dan O'Bannon; Brian Narelle; Cal Kuniholm; Dre Pahich
- Cinematography: Douglas Knapp
- Edited by: Dan O'Bannon
- Music by: John Carpenter
- Production companies: Jack H. Harris Enterprises; University of Southern California
- Distributed by: Bryanston Distributing Company
- Release dates: March 30, 1974 (Filmex, Los Angeles); January 16, 1975 (Theatrical, Los Angeles)
- Running time: 83 minutes
- Country: United States
- Language: English
- Budget: $60,000

Dark Star is a 1974 American independent science fiction comedy film produced, scored and directed by John Carpenter and co-written with Dan O'Bannon. It follows the crew of the deteriorating starship Dark Star, twenty years into their mission to destroy unstable planets that might threaten future colonization of other planets.

Beginning as a University of Southern California (USC) student film produced from 1970 to 1972, it was gradually expanded with reshoots in 1973, eventually appearing in its current feature-length form at Filmex in March 1974, and subsequently received a limited theatrical release in 1975. Its final budget is estimated at $60,000. While initially unsuccessful with audiences, it was relatively well received by critics, and continued to be shown in theaters as late as 1980. The home video revolution of the early 1980s helped the movie achieve "cult classic" status. O'Bannon collaborated with home video distributor VCI in the production of releases on VHS, LaserDisc, DVD, and eventually Blu-ray.

Dark Star was Carpenter's feature directorial debut; he also scored the film. It was also the feature debut for O'Bannon, who also served as editor, production designer, and visual effects supervisor, and appeared as Sergeant Pinback.

== Plot ==
In the mid-22nd century, mankind has begun to colonize interstellar space. Armed with Artificial Intelligence "Exponential Thermostellar Devices" (bombs which can talk and think), the scout ship Dark Star, with its crew of five and a sentient computer that manages the ship's systems, searches for unstable planets that might threaten future colonization.

Twenty relativistic Earth years into its mission (the crew only aging three years in that time), the Dark Star has aged poorly, and suffers frequent malfunctions of most systems. The ship experiences radiation leaks, a hull breach that destroys the living quarters, failing life support and communication systems, elevators that operate randomly, and a self-destructing storage room that destroys the ship's entire supply of toilet paper. Commanding Officer Powell has died in one such event, electrocuted by his malfunctioning chair, but remains aboard in cryogenic suspension. Lieutenant Doolittle, a former surfer from Malibu, has reluctantly taken over as commander. The tedium of their mission has driven the crew of Sergeant Pinback, Boiler, and Talby around the bend, so they have created distractions for themselves: Talby spends all of his time in an observation dome, staring blankly at the stars; Boiler plays the knife game with a switchblade; Doolittle plays solitaire and a homemade xylophone.

Pinback, meanwhile, plays practical jokes, maintains a video diary, and has adopted a mischievous beach-ball-like alien with sharp claws as the ship's mascot. After the alien escapes its room and attempts to push him down an elevator shaft, he accidentally kills it with a tranquilizer gun (which pops the alien like a balloon). He claims to really be Bill Froug, having accidentally replaced the real Pinback, who committed suicide prior to the mission.

En route to their next target in the Veil Nebula, the Dark Star is hit by electromagnetic energy during a space storm, resulting in another on-board malfunction. Thermostellar Bomb #20 receives an erroneous order to deploy, but the ship's computer talks it back into the bomb bay. Subsequently, Pinback's alien activates the bomb circuits while loose from the storage room, causing Bomb #20 to again emerge from the bomb bay. Once again, the computer is able to convince the bomb to return to the bomb bay, but the bomb warns that it will not be persuaded again. An accident with a laser while the crew is preparing for a real bomb run seriously damages the ship's computer and disables the bomb release mechanism, causing Bomb #20 to become stuck in the bomb bay while counting down to detonation. This time the crew cannot convince the bomb to stand down. Doolittle revives Powell, who advises him to teach the bomb phenomenology. Doolittle space-walks out to have a philosophical conversation with the bomb, explaining that it cannot be sure that it has received a genuine detonation command. With seconds left until detonation, the bomb agrees to suspend its countdown while it ponders Doolittle's ideas.

Pinback opens the airlock to admit Doolittle back into the ship, but accidentally ejects Talby, who was in the airlock attempting to repair the laser. Doolittle uses his rocket pack to go after Talby, who is in a space suit but has no maneuvering device. The bomb, meanwhile, has learned Cartesian doubt, and decides that all it can be sure of is its own existence and that its sole purpose in life is to explode. Proclaiming "Let there be light!", the bomb detonates, destroying Dark Star along with Pinback and Boiler. Talby and Doolittle, at a distance from the ship, are thrown clear. Talby drifts away with the Phoenix Asteroids, a traveling cluster with which he has long been fascinated. Doolittle, falling toward the unstable planet, seems to be set to die as a falling star. However, he finds an oblong hunk of debris and surfs into the atmosphere, with his fate left ambiguous.

== Cast ==
- Brian Narelle as Lieutenant Doolittle
- Dan O'Bannon as Sergeant Pinback
  - O'Bannon also voiced Bomb #19 and Bomb #20, although he is credited for those roles as "Alan Sheretz" and "Adam Beckenbaugh", respectively.
- Cal Kuniholm as Boiler
- Andreijah "Dre" Pahich as Talby
  - John Carpenter as Talby (voice)
- Joe Saunders as Commander Powell
  - John Carpenter as Commander Powell (voice)
- Barbara "Cookie" Knapp as Computer
- Miles Watkins as Mission Control
- Nick Castle as Alien

== Production ==
=== Screenplay ===
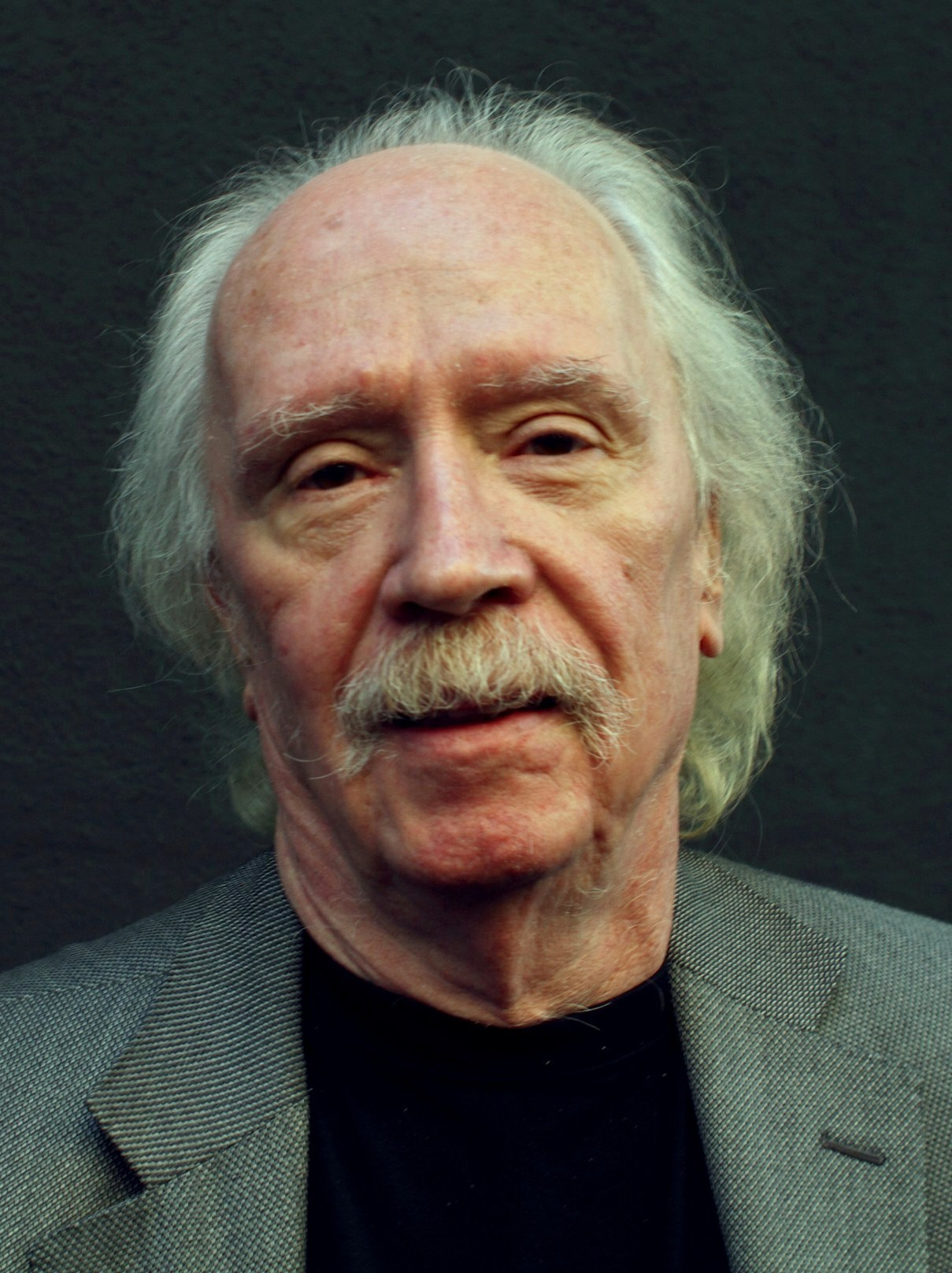
Director John Carpenter in 2011

The screenplay was written by Carpenter and O'Bannon while they were film students at the University of Southern California. Initially titled The Electric Dutchman, the original concept was Carpenter's, while O'Bannon "flesh[ed] out many of the original ideas" and contributed many of the funniest moments. The title was changed to Planetfall, before settling on Dark Star. According to O'Bannon, "The ending was copped from Ray Bradbury's story 'Kaleidoscope'", found in the short story collection The Illustrated Man (1951). This homage led to a confrontation between Bradbury and actor Brian Narelle decades later, when, during a chance encounter, Bradbury learned of Narelle's appearance in the film, whereupon Bradbury berated Narelle (who had nothing to do with the story theft). O'Bannon references one of his USC teachers, William Froug, when Pinback says in a video diary entry, "I should tell you my name is not really Sergeant Pinback, my name is Bill Froug, and I am a fuel maintenance technician."

=== Filming, reshoots, and edits ===
The film began as a 45-minute 16 mm film student project with a final budget of $6000. Beginning with an initial budget of $1000 from the University of Southern California School of Cinema in late 1970, the production was staffed by students, with some outside contributions from Hollywood professionals such as Greg Jein and Ron Cobb. Carpenter and O'Bannon spearheaded the project, and brought fellow Cinema students Brian Narelle (Lt. Doolittle) and Dre Pahich (Talby) to act. Cal Kuniholm (Boiler) was a friend of Carpenter's, studying Business Administration at USC. Carpenter had to dub his own voice over that of Pahich, who had a thick accent. Carpenter and O'Bannon completed the first version of the film in early 1972.

With no money left, they needed an investor to achieve feature film length, and Jonathan Kaplan gave them $10,000 in financial support, which with the support of Canadian distributor Jack Murphy (credited as "Production Associate") allowed them to shoot an additional fifty minutes in 1973. These scenes included the asteroid storm, Doolittle playing bottles on strings as a musical instrument, the scenes in the crew sleeping quarters, the scenes in the hallways of the ship (Pinback with the sunlamp, Boiler with the laser gun, etc.) and all the scenes featuring the beach ball alien. Kuniholm and Pahich had shorter hair by this time, and wore wigs for continuity with the 1971 footage.

Through John Landis, a friend of O'Bannon, the movie came to the attention of producer-distributor Jack H. Harris, who obtained the theatrical distribution rights. Deeming about 30 minutes of the film "boring and unusable" (including a protracted scene of the crew sleeping in their quarters, not responding to the computer voice), he insisted that cuts be made, and additional 35 mm footage be shot to bring the movie back up to a releasable length. Other edits that Harris wanted, to secure a more marketable G rating, toned down rough language, and blurred a wall of nude centerfolds. O'Bannon later lamented that as a result of the alterations for commercial distribution, "We had what would have been the world's most impressive student film and it became the world's least impressive professional film".

=== Special effects ===
O'Bannon created many of the special effects. Ron Cobb designed the ship, O'Bannon and Greg Jein did the model work, and Bob Greenberg did the animation. Cobb drew the original ship design on a napkin while eating at an International House of Pancakes restaurant. In 2023, the model of the ship was sold to an unnamed bidder for $40,000 USD.

To depict the transit of the Dark Star into hyperspace, O'Bannon devised an animated effect in which the stars in the background turn into streaks of light while the ship appears to be motionless. He achieved this by tracking the camera while leaving the shutter open. This is considered to be the first depiction in cinema history of a spaceship jumping into hyperspace. It is thought that O'Bannon was influenced by the striking "star gate" sequence created by Douglas Trumbull for 2001: A Space Odyssey (1968). The same effect was later employed in Star Wars (1977).

== Soundtrack ==
Dark Star's score mainly consists of electronic music created by Carpenter, using a EMS VCS 3.In 1980, subsequent to the film's re-release the previous year, a soundtrack album was released, containing not only music, but also sound effects and dialogue from the film. The album was remastered for a limited 2016 vinyl rerelease, which included an additional seven-inch record containing remakes and other bonus tracks.

The song played during the opening and closing credits is "Benson Arizona". It concerns a man who travels the galaxy at the speed of light, while missing his beloved back on Earth. The music was written by Carpenter, and the lyrics by Bill Taylor. The lead vocalist was John Yager, a college friend of Carpenter. Yager was not a professional musician, "apart from being in a band in college". Benson, Arizona is a real-life location, and has named a county road "Dark Star Road" in honor of the film. Additionally, the Valhalla Supermassive VST reverb/delay audio processing unit includes a preset called "Benson Arizona" in tribute to the movie.

== Release ==
The completed film premiered on March 30, 1974, at Filmex, the Los Angeles International Film Exposition. At the time, Carpenter described the movie as "Waiting for Godot in outer space." Harris sold it to Bryanston Pictures, which opened it in fifty theaters on January 16, 1975.

In June 1979, after Carpenter and O'Bannon had found commercial success with other films, Atlantic Releasing Corporation rereleased Dark Star, noting on a promotional poster that it was "from the author of Alien & the director of Halloween", and including the tagline, "The Ultimate Cosmic Comedy!"

=== Home media ===
In August 1983, VCI Entertainment released a theatrical cut of Dark Star on videocassette. It was criticized by O'Bannon. A new video master was obtained from O'Bannon's personal 35 mm print, and a widescreen "Special Edition" of the film was released by 1987 on budget distributor United Home Video.

O'Bannon later re-edited the movie into a seventy-two minute director's cut, removing much of the footage that had been shot and added after Harris had bought the distribution rights. This version was released on LaserDisc in 1992.

The film was released on DVD March 23, 1999. Both the original theatrical version and a shorter, sixty-eight minute "special edition" were included.

A two-disc "Hyperdrive Edition" DVD set was released on October 26, 2010. Along with the two versions of the movie previously released on DVD, it included a feature-length documentary, Let There be Light: The Odyssey of Dark Star, which explores the origins and production of the film.

In 2012, a "Thermostellar Edition" was released on Blu-ray. It included the special features of the 2010 release, but not the shorter special edition of the movie, only the theatrical version.

== Reception ==
=== Audience reactions ===
While greeted enthusiastically by the crowd at Filmex, the film was not well-received upon its initial theatrical release. Carpenter and O'Bannon reported nearly empty theaters, and little reaction to the humor in the movie. However, the home video revolution of the early 1980s saw Dark Star become a cult film among sci-fi fans. Director Quentin Tarantino called the film a "masterpiece."

=== Critical response ===
An early review from Variety, recalled by Carpenter as "the first bad review I got", described the film as "a limp parody of Stanley Kubrick's 2001: A Space Odyssey that warrants attention only for some remarkably believable special effects achieved with very little money." After its re-release in 1979, Roger Ebert gave the movie three stars out of four, writing: "Dark Star is one of the damnedest science fiction movies I've ever seen, a berserk combination of space opera, intelligent bombs, and beach balls from other worlds." Review aggregator Rotten Tomatoes gives it a 74% "Fresh" score based on 34 reviews, with an average rating of 6.4/10. The website's critics consensus reads, "A loopy 2001 satire, Dark Star may not be the most consistent sci-fi comedy, but its portrayal of human eccentricity is a welcome addition to the genre." The aggregator Metacritic gives the film a score of 66 out of 100, based on ten critics, indicating "generally favorable reviews". Leonard Maltin awarded it two and a half stars, describing it as "enjoyable for sci-fi fans and surfers", and complimenting the effective use of the limited budget.

== Legacy ==
=== Influence ===
The "Beachball with Claws" segment of the film was reworked by O'Bannon into the science fiction-horror film Alien (1979). After witnessing audiences failing to laugh at parts of Dark Star which were intended as humorous, O'Bannon commented, "If I can't make them laugh, then maybe I can make them scream."

Doug Naylor has said in interviews that Dark Star was the inspiration for Dave Hollins: Space Cadet, the radio sketches that evolved into science fiction sitcom Red Dwarf.

Dark Star has also been cited as an inspiration for the machinima series Red vs. Blue by its creator Burnie Burns. Metal Gear series creator Hideo Kojima revealed the iDroid's voice was inspired by the female computer voice from Dark Star.

Indie rock band Pinback adopted its name from the character Sergeant Pinback, and often used samples from the movie in its early work. Synth-pop band Erasure sampled dialogue from this film (along with Barbarella) in their song "Sweet, Sweet Baby", the B-side to "Drama!", the debut single off their album Wild! (1989). The Human League used a sample from the film at the end of "Circus of Death", the B-side of their debut single, "Being Boiled".

Cem Oral, under the alias Oral Experience, sampled dialogue from this film in his song "Never Been on E". The name of Pinbacker, the antagonist in Danny Boyle's film Sunshine (2007), also was inspired by Sergeant Pinback. Trevor Something used samples from Doolittle's conversation with the bomb in his 2014 mixtape Trevor Something Does Not Exist.

Progressive metal band Star One used the plot of the movie for their song "Spaced Out," with the name taken from the film tagline "The Spaced Out Odyssey". German Digital Hardcore artist Bomb 20 is named after Bomb #20 from this film. Gravity Wine Co., based in Victoria, Australia, produces a red wine blend of Syrah and Grenache that is called Dark Star and which has "Dark Star - Phoenix Asteroids" written as a title at the top of the information section on its label.

== See also ==
- List of American films of 1974
- List of cult films
