= Echaskech =

British electronica/audio-visual act

Echaskech are a British electronica / audio-visual act based in London. The band formed in 2004 and were originally a duo composed of Dom Hoare and Andy Gillham, who had previously worked together as a drum & bass DJ act touring with artists such as LTJ Bukem and Grooverider. Early in 2005 the music duo became a multimedia trio with the addition of visual artist Mach V, who provides visuals during live performances and whose prior work includes music festivals such as The Big Chill and a collaboration with Sounds from the Ground that exhibited at Tate Britain. Also in 2005 Echaskech performed along with Jon Hopkins at various events in London and as a result Jon introduced the band to Just Music who subsequently signed them.

Echaskech's eclectic style spans across the electronic music genre, as Ian Roullier from musicOMH says, "This is where Orbital, Brian Eno, The Radiophonic Workshop, Warp's Artificial Intelligence series from the early '90s and good old tuneful, contemporary, grimy dance music collide".

Shatterproof, the act's second album on Just Music was compared to The Future Sound of London's Lifeforms by the BBC's Colin Buttimer and Ben Hogwood of DMC, who commented that "The band move between a spaced-out ambience, peppered with splintered beats, to darker moments" on this release.

Musically, the duo have collaborated with numerous acts including Roots Manuva, James Yuill, Max Cooper, Kraddy, Posthuman_(band) and SBTRKT with festival performances at Glade, Blissfields, Secret Garden Party, Solfest, Big Chill and Festinho. Their performance at Festinho 2010 was nominated for the UK Festival Awards Critics’ Choice Award.

In November 2010, Echaskech collaborated with Traum Schallplatten artist Max Cooper on a remix of "Chaotisch Serie" for his Expressions EP.

In December 2013 the single 'Form | Function' was debuted on the Lauren Laverne show BBC Radio 6 Music, and officially announced by SPIN magazine on 14 Jan 2014 as being the first single to a new album Origin to be released 24 Feb 2014 on Just Music.

In 2014 Dom and Andy from Echaskech started the record label 'VLSI'. The label's name is homage to a classic rave track by Epoch 90 and also a nod to Very Large Scale Integration where thousands of transistors were combined into a single chip. The label has had releases by BUNKR, Jonathan Krisp, and Echaskech themselves.

2020 sees the release of a new studio album 'Invisible City' and a string of 'lockdown' performances during the Covid-19 pandemic. Other releases included an experimental cassette release called 'Andromeda' on Balkan Vinyl the label owned by Posthuman_(band).

Dom Hoare is the nephew of computer scientist Sir Tony Hoare.

== Discography ==
Albums:

- Skechbook (2007)
- Shatterproof (2009)
- Origin (2014)
- Invisible City (2020)

Singles & EPs:

- Popstars (2007)
- Every Touch (2008)
- The Storm Before The Calm (2009)
- Future Sex EP (2009)
- 626 - [ASIP - Uncharted Places] (2013)
- Form | Function EP (2014)
- Certainty of Tides EP (2017)
- Twich EP (2017)
- Andromeda (mini album) (2020)
- Rackmount (2020)
- Mirrors EP (2021)

Remixes:

- Chaotic Serie (2010) - Expressions EP, Max Cooper
