= List of private schools in the United Kingdom =

This is an incomplete list of private (independent) schools in the United Kingdom.

Also refer to the Headmasters' and Headmistresses' Conference for a list of their member schools (boarding and day schools) in the United Kingdom, Crown dependencies and the Republic of Ireland.

== Wales ==
- Atlantic College
- Cardiff Sixth Form College
- Christ College, Brecon
- Ffynone House School
- Howell's School Llandaff
- Kings Monkton School
- Llandovery College
- Haberdashers' Monmouth School
- Myddelton College
- Rougemont School
- Rydal Penrhos
- St Clare's School, Newton
- St David's College, Llandudno
- St John's College, Cardiff
- St Michael's School, Llanelli
- The Cathedral School, Llandaff
- Westbourne House School, Penarth

== Northern Ireland ==
- Methodist College Belfast
- Rockport School
- Belfast Royal Academy
- Campbell College
- Strathearn School
- Foyle and Londonderry College
- Portora Royal School
- Royal Belfast Academical Institution
- Royal School Dungannon
- The Royal School, Armagh
- Holywood Rudolf Steiner School

== See also ==
- List of schools in the United Kingdom
- Private school
- Private schools in the United Kingdom
- Public school (United Kingdom)
