= Anna Naklab =

German singer-songwriter (born 1993)

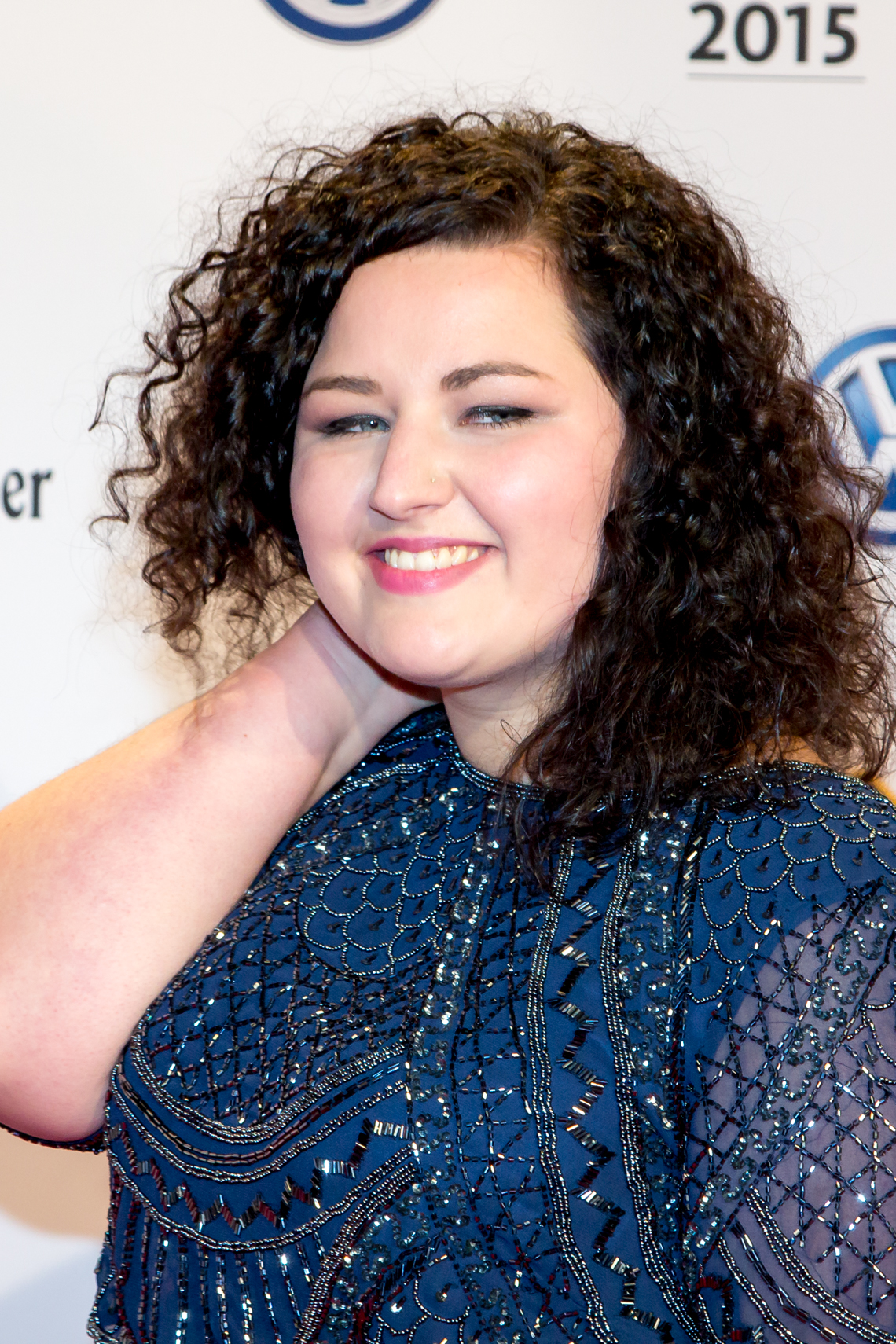
- Naklab at the 1LIVE Krone 2015 (Germany Music Awards)

Background information
- Born: Annika Klose; 14 July 1993 (age 33); Göttingen, Germany
- Genres: Dance, House, Deep House, Pop
- Occupations: Singer; Songwriter
- Instruments: Vocals, guitar
- Years active: 2013–present
- Label: Raison Music
- Website: AnnaNaklab.com

Annika Klose (born 14 July 1993 in Göttingen), known professionally as Anna Naklab, is a German singer-songwriter. She grew up in the town of Northeim in the German state of Lower Saxony near Göttingen, Germany. Singers and bands that inspire her very much are Adele, Amy Winehouse and Room Eleven.

== Career ==
In 2013, Anna Naklab worked with German producer and DJ Parra for Cuva on a cover version (remix) of Chris Isaak's original 1989 song titled "Wicked Game". The remix was re-titled as "Wicked Games" (plural). "Wicked Games" was first released on Beatport, a U.S. based electronica website, as a digital download in August 2013. A mainstream release followed as a digital download in France in October 2013 and Germany in February 2014. The song charted at number 1 in the United Kingdom and charted in Australia, France, Belgium, Netherlands and other European nations.

In early 2015, Anna Naklab, German producer and DJ Alle Farben and Younotus released a cover version of the German band Reamonn's original 2000 song titled "Supergirl". In July 2015 Anna Naklab's version of "Supergirl" charted at number 1 in Austria and number 2 on Germany's Top Forty Charts. The official music video of Anna's Supergirl, posted on YouTube, received over 63,500,000 views in less than one year.

== Discography ==
=== Singles ===
Year	Title	Peak positions				Certifications
Year	Title	GER	AUT	FRA	SWI	Certifications
2015	"Supergirl" (featuring Alle Farben & Younotus)	2	1	52	5	BVMI: Platinum; IFPI AUT: Gold; IFPI SWI: Gold; PROMUSICAE: Gold; ZPAV: Diamond
2016	"Whole"					
2017	"Dust" (with twocolors)					

As featured artist

Year	Title	Peak positions				Certifications
Year	Title	GER	AUT	FRA	NED	Certifications
2013	"Wicked Games" (Parra for Cuva featuring Anna Naklab)	89	14	71	6	ARIA: Platinum; BPI: Platinum; NVPI: Platinum

== Awards ==
- Nominated as Best Female Artist...1LIVE Krone (2015)
