= Rolling Stone's 500 Greatest Albums of All Time =

Recurring music ranking

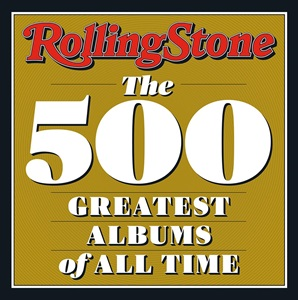
Cover of the oversize companion book to the 2020 list

"The 500 Greatest Albums of All Time" is a recurring opinion survey and music ranking of the finest albums in history, compiled by the American music magazine Rolling Stone. It is based on weighted votes from selected musicians, critics, and industry figures. The first list was published in a special issue of the magazine in 2003 and a related book in 2005.

Critics have accused the lists of lending disproportionate weight to artists of a particular ethnicity and gender. In the original list, most of the selections were albums by white male rock musicians, with the top position held by the Beatles' Sgt. Pepper's Lonely Hearts Club Band (1967). In 2012, Rolling Stone published a revised edition, drawing on the original and a later survey of albums released up until the early 2000s.

Another updated edition of the list was published in 2020, with 269 new entries replacing albums from the two previous editions. It was based on a new survey and did not consider the surveys conducted for the 2003 and 2012 lists. The 2020 list featured more artists of color and female artists, topped by Marvin Gaye's What's Going On (1971). It received similar criticisms as the previous lists. Another revision was published in 2023.

Since 2020 Rolling Stone has also produced a weekly podcast called Rolling Stone's 500 Greatest Albums, which, according to the magazine, is based on an "updated version of Rolling Stone's 500 Greatest Albums list". The podcast is hosted by Brittany Spanos, a staff writer at the magazine.

== Background ==
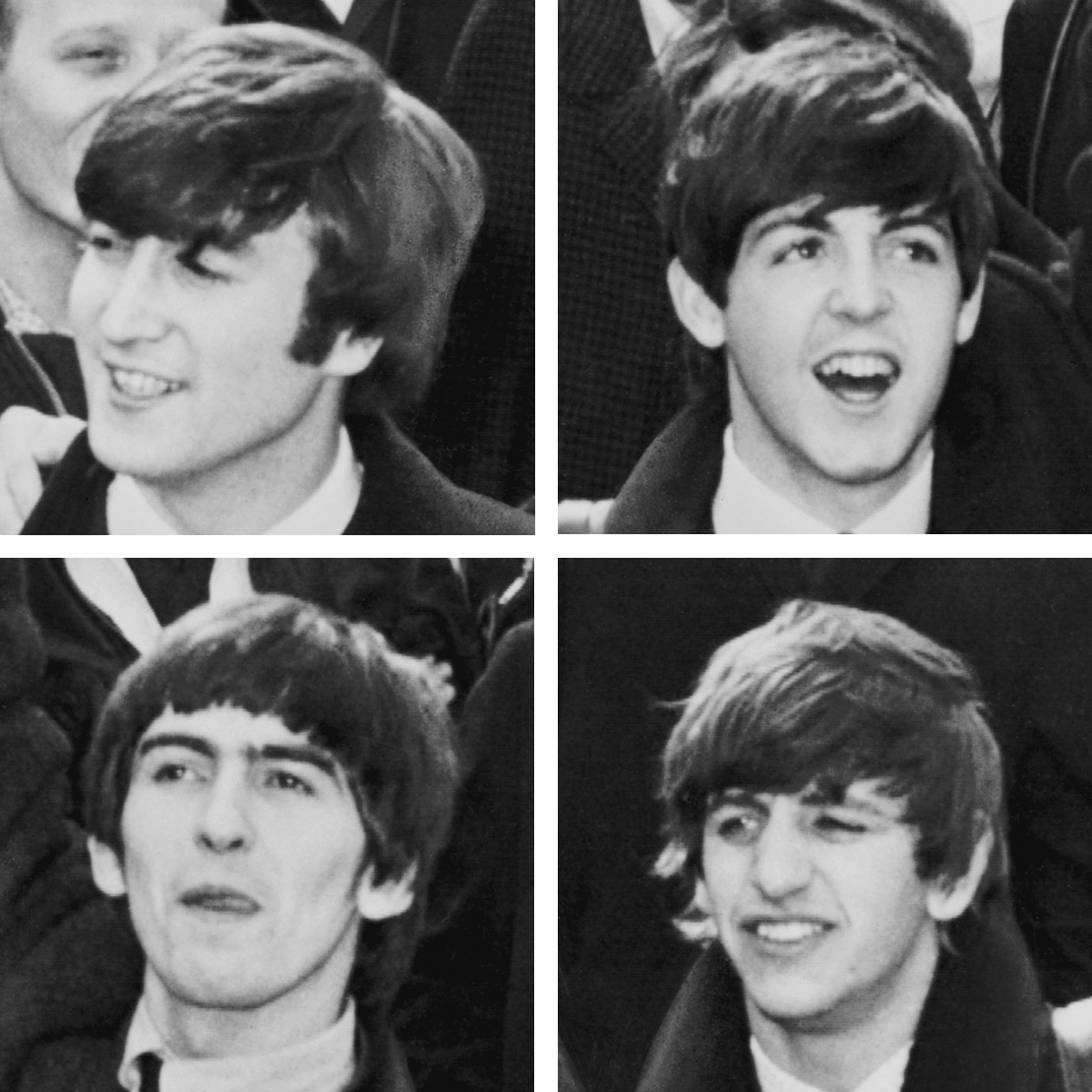
The Beatles (pictured in 1964) had nine albums on the most recent list.

The first version of the list, published as a magazine in November 2003, was based on the votes of 273 rock musicians, critics, and industry figures, each of whom submitted a ranked list of 50 albums. The accounting firm Ernst & Young devised a point system to weigh votes for 1,600 submitted titles. The Beatles' 1967 album Sgt. Pepper's Lonely Hearts Club Band topped the list, with Rolling Stone's editors describing it as "the most important rock 'n' roll album ever made". The Beach Boys' Pet Sounds (1966) was ranked second in recognition of its influence on Sgt. Pepper. The list also included compilations and "greatest hits" collections.

An amended list was released as a book in 2005, with an introduction by guitarist Steven Van Zandt. Some compilation albums were removed, and Robert Johnson's The Complete Recordings was substituted for both of his King of the Delta Blues Singers volumes, making room for a total of eight new entries on the list. (Note: The Complete Recordings was reinstated to the list in the 2012 edition.)

On May 31, 2012, Rolling Stone published a revised list, drawing on the original and a later survey of albums up until the early 2000s. It was made available in "bookazine" format on newsstands in the US from April 27 to July 25. The new list contained 38 albums not present in the previous one, 16 of them released after 2003. The top listings remained unchanged.

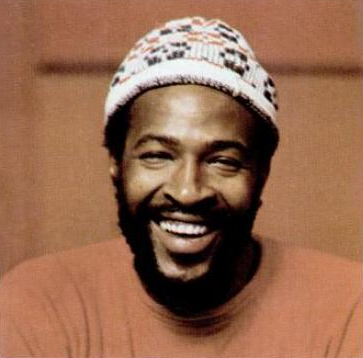
Marvin Gaye (pictured in 1973) had the top album in the 2020 listing.

On September 22, 2020, another revision of the list was published. It drew upon a new survey conducted with "more than 300 artists, producers, critics, and music-industry figures", including:

- Craig Kallman
- Daft Punk
- Beyoncé
- Taylor Swift
- Billie Eilish
- H.E.R.
- Tierra Whack
- Lindsey Jordan
- Adam Clayton
- The Edge
- Raekwon
- Gene Simmons
- Stevie Nicks
- Radiohead

Each voter was asked to submit a ranked list of 50 favorite albums. This time, the list included more musicians who were female and people of color, with many such artists represented at higher rankings than on the previous lists. Eighty-six of the entries were 21st-century releases; 154 new entries were not on either of the two previous editions, and rap albums figured three times as much. Marvin Gaye's What's Going On (1971) was featured at the number one spot.

A revision to the 2020 list was created in 2023, replacing some older albums with newer releases from the 2020s.

== Reception ==
The original Rolling Stone 500 was criticized for being male-dominated, outmoded and almost entirely Anglo-American in focus. Writing in USA Today, Edna Gundersen described the list as predictable and "weighted toward testosterone-fueled vintage rock". Following the publicity surrounding the list, rock critic Jim DeRogatis, a former Rolling Stone editor, published Kill Your Idols: A New Generation of Rock Writers Reconsiders the Classics in 2004. The book featured a number of critics arguing against the high evaluation of various "great" albums, many of which had been included in the list.

Jonny Sharp, a contributor to NME's own 500 greatest albums list, described the 2012 Rolling Stone list as a "soulless, canon-centric [list] of the same tired old titles", adding: "looking at their 500, when the only album in their top 10 less than 40 years old is London Calling, I think I prefer the NME's less critically-correct approach."

Responding to the 2020 revision, Consequence of Sound's Alex Young wrote that the lesser representation of white male rock musicians was "the biggest takeaway". According to CNN's Leah Asmelash, "The change represents a massive shift for the magazine, moving to recognize more contemporary albums and a wider range of tastes." Conversely, Jonathan McNamara of The Japan Times criticized the list for underrepresenting Asian and non-Anglophone artists, stating that "It seems a shame then that Rolling Stone's musical brain trust of writers and industry contributors [...] didn't take the opportunity to hold up albums from the world's non-English-speaking artists and bands."

== Statistics ==
=== Number of albums from each decade ===
2003 Edition
1. 1950s 11 (2.28%)
2. 1960s 126 (26.1%)
3. 1970s 183 (38.0%)
4. 1980s 88 (18.3%)
5. 1990s 61 (12.7%)
6. 2000s 13 (2.70%)
2012 Edition
1. 1950s 10 (2.00%)
2. 1960s 105 (21.0%)
3. 1970s 186 (37.2%)
4. 1980s 84 (16.8%)
5. 1990s 73 (14.6%)
6. 2000s 40 (8.00%)
7. 2010s 2 (0.40%)
2020 Edition
1. 1950s 9 (1.80%)
2. 1960s 74 (14.8%)
3. 1970s 157 (31.4%)
4. 1980s 71 (14.2%)
5. 1990s 103 (20.6%)
6. 2000s 50 (10.0%)
7. 2010s 36 (7.20%)
2023 Edition
1. 1950s 9 (1.80%)
2. 1960s 71 (14.2%)
3. 1970s 155 (31.0%)
4. 1980s 71 (14.2%)
5. 1990s 101 (20.2%)
6. 2000s 51 (10.2%)
7. 2010s 36 (7.20%)
8. 2020s 6 (1.20%)

=== Artists with the most albums ===
The following table lists the artists who had at least three albums included on at least one edition of the list (71 artists in total).

Artist	Total number of albums by artist				Notes
Artist	2023	2020	2012	2003	Notes
The Beatles	9	9	10	11	2020/2023: One album in the top 10, at no. 5.; 2003/2012: Four albums in the top 10, at no. 10, 5, 3, and 1.
Bob Dylan	8	8	11	10	2020/2023: Count includes one album credited to Bob Dylan & the Band; Dylan has one album in the top 10, at no. 9.; 2003/2012: Count includes one album credited to Bob Dylan & the Band; Dylan has two albums in the top 10, at nos. 9, and 4.
Neil Young	7	7	6	6	2003/2012/2020/2023: Counts include one album credited to Crosby, Stills, Nash & Young and two credited to Neil Young & Crazy Horse.
The Rolling Stones	6	6	10	10	2003/2012: One album in the top 10 at no. 7.
Kanye West	6	6	3	—N/a	
Bruce Springsteen	5	5	8	8	
David Bowie	5	5	5	6	
Led Zeppelin	5	5	5	5	
Aretha Franklin	4	4	2	2	
Beyoncé	4	3	0	0	2020/2023: Count includes one album as a member of Destiny's Child.
Joni Mitchell	4	4	2	2	2020/2023: One album in the top 10, at no. 3.
Pink Floyd	4	4	4	4	
Prince	4	4	4	4	2020/2023: Count includes one album credited to Prince and the Revolution; Prince has one album in the top 10, at no. 8.; 2003/2012: Count includes one album generally credited to Prince and the Revolution, Purple Rain.
Radiohead	4	4	5	3	
Stevie Wonder	4	4	4	4	2020/2023: One album in the top 10, at no. 4.
The Velvet Underground	4	4	4	4	2003/2012/2020/2023: Count includes one album credited to the Velvet Underground & Nico.
The Who	4	4	7	7	
Al Green	3	3	3	3	
Beastie Boys	3	3	2	2	
Big Star	3	3	3	3	
Black Sabbath	3	3	3	3	
D'Angelo	3	3	1	1	2020: Counts include one album as D'Angelo and the Vanguard.
Elvis Presley	3	3	3	3	
Fiona Apple	3	3	0	0	
George Clinton	3	3	3	3	2003/2012/2020: Counts include two albums as a member of Funkadelic, one with Parliament.
James Brown	3	3	3	4	
Janet Jackson	3	3	2	2	
Jay-Z	3	3	3	2	
Kendrick Lamar	3	3	0	—N/a	
Marvin Gaye	3	3	3	3	2020/2023: One album in the top 10, at no. 1.; 2003/2012: One album in the top 10, at no. 6.
Michael Jackson	3	3	3	3	
Madonna	3	3	3	4	
Nirvana	3	3	3	3	2020/2023: One album in the top 10, at no. 6.
Outkast	3	3	2	1	
Pavement	3	3	2	2	
Sly and the Family Stone	3	3	4	4	
Taylor Swift	3	2	0	—N/a	
The Band	3	3	3	3	2003/2012/2020/2023: Count includes one album credited to Bob Dylan & the Band.
The Clash	3	3	3	3	2003/2012: One album in the top 10, at no. 8.
The Jimi Hendrix Experience	3	3	3	3	
Tom Petty	3	3	1	1	2003/2012/2020/2023: Each count include one album as Tom Petty and the Heartbreakers.
Bob Marley and the Wailers	2	3	4	5	
Creedence Clearwater Revival	2	2	2	3	
Miles Davis	2	2	3	3	
Eminem	2	2	2	3	
Grateful Dead	2	2	4	4	
Elton John	2	2	5	6	
Ray Charles	2	2	3	3	
The Byrds	2	2	4	5	
The Kinks	2	2	3	3	
Public Enemy	2	2	2	3	
R.E.M.	2	2	3	3	
Otis Redding	2	2	3	5	
Steely Dan	2	2	3	3	
The Stooges	2	2	3	3	
Talking Heads	2	2	4	4	
The Beach Boys	2	3	3	3	2003/2012/2020/2023: One album in the top 10, at no. 2.
U2	2	2	5	5	
Elvis Costello	1	2	4	4	2003/2012: Counts include one album as Elvis Costello & the Attractions.
The Doors	1	1	3	3	
Nick Drake	1	1	1	3	
Randy Newman	1	1	3	3	
Roxy Music	1	2	2	4	
The Police	1	1	4	4	
Simon & Garfunkel	1	1	3	4	
The Smiths	1	1	4	4	
Tom Waits	1	1	3	3	
Muddy Waters	1	1	3	3	
Cream	0	1	3	3	
Jackson Browne	0	0	2	3	

=== Artists' gender distribution through the decades ===
Comparison between the original 2003 "500 Greatest Albums of All Time" ranking made by the magazine Rolling Stone, and the updated 2020 ranking. This graph highlights the gender of the artists, gender of the voters from both rankings, and the decades in which the great albums were released.

== See also ==
- Album era
- All Time Top 1000 Albums
- Apple Music 100 Best Albums
- Critic's Choice: Top 200 Albums
- NME's The 500 Greatest Albums of All Time
- 1001 Albums You Must Hear Before You Die
- Rolling Stone's 500 Greatest Songs of All Time
- Rolling Stone's 100 Greatest Music Videos of All Time
- Rolling Stone's 100 Greatest Songwriters of All Time
- Rolling Stone's 100 Greatest Artists of All Time
- Rolling Stone's 200 Greatest Singers of All Time
