= Aukai =

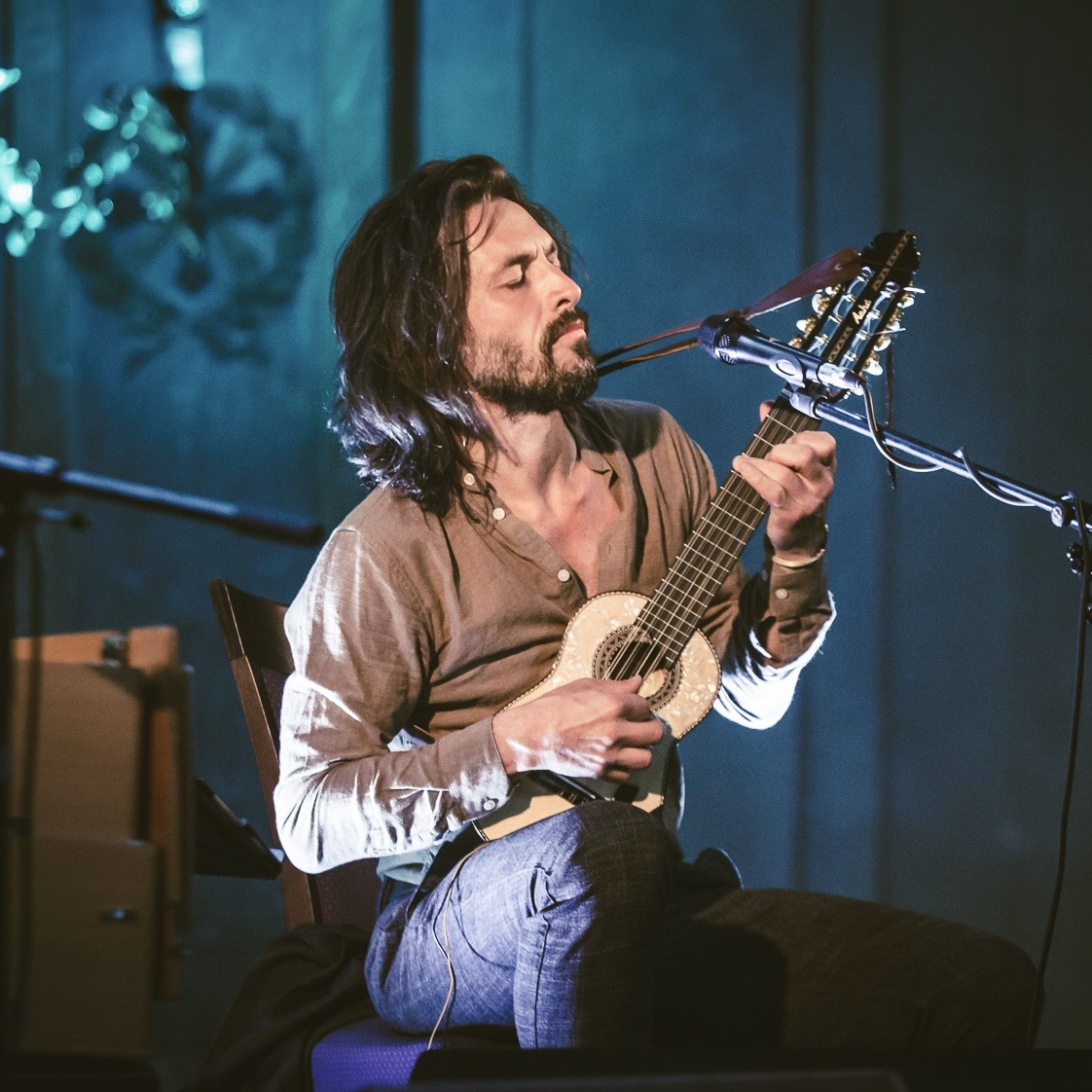

Background information
- Born: Ralph Markus Sieber; March 1, 1974 (age 52)
- Occupations: Composer, Musician
- Instruments: Charango, Classical Guitar
- Website: https://www.aukaimusic.com/

Aukai is a German-American multi-instrumentalist and composer.

== Early life ==
Born Markus Sieber in East Germany 15 years before the wall came down, Aukai moved to Potsdam at the age of 16. He played as a guitarist in alternative rock bands in East Berlin's vibrant '90s rock scene before shifting focus to work as a theater, film and TV actor in Berlin and St. Petersburg.

== Career ==
After moving to Mexico and marrying into a Mexican family in 2005, Aukai grew interested in indigenous and world music. He immersed himself in the music scene of Tepoztlán and fell in love with the ronroco – a type of charango. Aukai continued to travel and eventually relocated to Colorado, where he worked on his first album. His eponymous debut record inspired by those travels, was released in 2016.

Aukai's body of work includes collaborations with artists such as Parra for Cuva and with Berlin-based cellist Anne Müller, who contributed to multiple Aukai albums including Reminiscence (2019), Branches of Sun (2018), and Apricity (2022).

Aukai also collaborated with Tony Award-winning American composer Jamshied Sharifi on the 2021 single The Unanimous Now and again in April 2024, when Sharifi arranged Aukai’s compositions into the Vientos EP for flute and keyboard ensemble.

Having previously stated that Aukai was "born out of a desire to create music that could work in tandem with film, video, theatre and the visual arts", he began composing original scores for film and television in 2023. In 2024, he co-composed the score for the Netflix production El Portal: La historia oculta de Zona Divas alongside composer and cellist Clarice Jensen.

March 2026 marked the release of Chambers, Aukai’s first album on which he performed and recorded all instruments himself. Much of the album was recorded in Saal 3 at Berlin’s historic Funkhaus studio complex, a space originally designed for chamber ensemble recordings and later restored and upgraded by composer and pianist Nils Frahm. Additional material was recorded at a studio situated in the forests outside of Vilnius, where Aukai recorded bell platesto include their resonant ambient sounds in some of the pieces.

== Discography ==
Studio albums

- Chambers (2026)
- Temporal (2024)
- Apricity B-Sides and Versions (2023)
- Apricity (2022)
- Entretanto (2021)
- Game Trails (2020)
- Reminiscence (2019)
- Branches of Sun (2018)
- Aukai (2016)

== Filmography ==
Year	Film / Series	Director	Credited as
2002	Heimatfilm!	Daniel Krauss	Actor
2003	They've Got Knut	Stefan Krohmer	Actor
2006	Kühe lächeln mit den Augen	Johanna Icks	Actor
2023	Five to One	David Atrakchi, Vincenzo Carrano	Composer
2024	Dynasty and Destiny	Travis Lee Ratcliff	Composer
2024	El Portal: La historia oculta de Zona Divas	Astrid Rondero, Fernanda Valadez	Co-composer, shared with Clarice Jensen
