= B.D. Graft =

German visual artist (born 1988)

- Born: Brian de Graft; 21 September 1988 (age 37); Mayen, Rhineland-Palatinate, Germany
- Education: University of Amsterdam (BA, MA)
- Occupation: Visual artist

Brian de Graft (born 21 September 1988), better known by the name B.D. Graft, is a German visual artist living and working in Amsterdam.

== Early life and career ==
De Graft was born in Mayen, Germany to a German mother and a half Ghanaian, half Dutch father. When he was seven, the family moved to South-East London, England, where they would stay for seven years. It was here that De Graft discovered his love for music and skateboarding, which would go on to influence his art.

When de Graft was 14, the family moved to Cologne, Germany, where de Graft finished highschool.

In 2011, de Graft moved to Amsterdam, the Netherlands, to study at the University of Amsterdam. He obtained a BA in Media and Culture (with a specialization in Film), followed by an MA in English literature and Culture. During his studies, de Graft began making art as a hobby. In 2014, he started uploading his work to Instagram and decided to concentrate on his art full time in late 2016.

Recurring themes in De Graft's work include ownership (most notably his project "Is It Mine if I Add Some Yellow?"), nature, the pursuit of happiness, and the ‘deceptively decorative’. He mainly works on paper and canvas using acrylic, Oil pastels and charcoal.

== Exhibitions and collaborations ==
De Graft has exhibited internationally, including in Seoul and New York City, and has collaborated with notable creatives and brands, including Australian rock band Pond and fashion brand Off-White.

== Book ==
De Graft's debut book "Living Things", which showcases his plant-based artworks, was published through Zioxla publishing house in 2019.

Living Things is the debut book from German artist B.D. Graft, whose light, graphic style recalls Matisse's cutouts mixed with Bauhaus-era design and Pop Art levity. In the 64-page softcover book, foliage and fruit play a central role, as does color. The book includes key works from Graft's ongoing series of plants in vases – collages and paintings of gestural foliage emerging from boldly hued vessels – and emphasizes the artist's playful side. For example, in an oil pastel titled "Pot Head," a loosely rendered, fleshy figure has a big blue planter for a head. "Making art brightens up my day," Graft explains, "and I’d like to pass that feeling on to the observer."
