= Rolling Stone's 100 Greatest Music Videos of All Time =

List of greatest music videos of all time

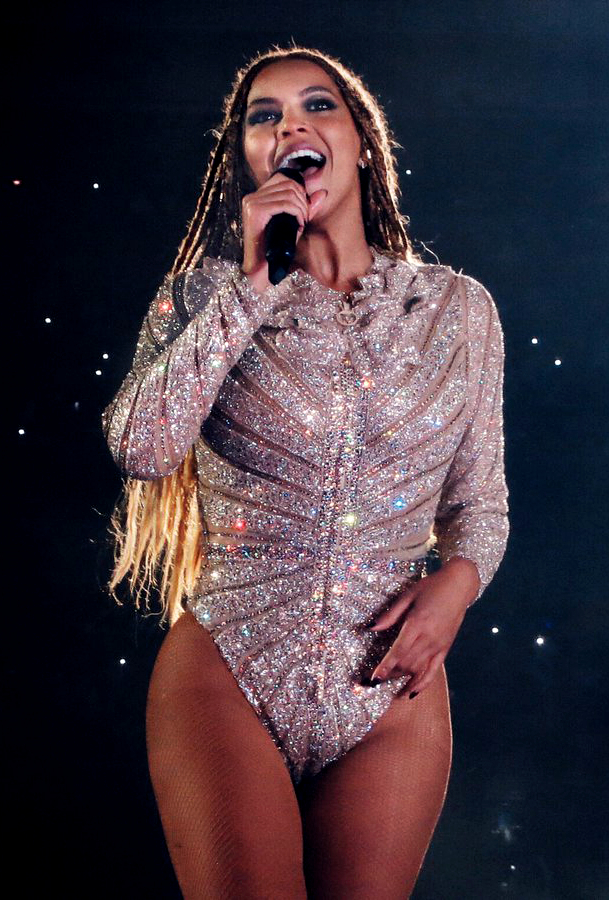
Beyoncé's "Formation" (2016) topped the 2021 list as the greatest music video of all time

"The 100 Greatest Music Videos of All Time" is a recurring ranking of the best music videos of all time, compiled by the American magazine Rolling Stone. The first list was published in October 1993 in a special issue of the magazine, with Peter Gabriel's "Sledgehammer" (1986) topping the list. A revised version was published in July 2021 in celebration of MTV's 40th anniversary, with Beyoncé's "Formation" (2016) being named the greatest music video of all time.

== Top 10 music videos ==
1993 edition

Rank	Artist	Music video	Year
1	Peter Gabriel	"Sledgehammer"	1986
2	Nirvana	"Smells Like Teen Spirit"	1991
3	R.E.M.	"Losing My Religion"	1991
4	Neil Young	"This Note's For You"	1989
5	Sinead O'Connor	"Nothing Compares 2 U"	1990
6	Van Halen	"Right Now"	1992
7	Bob Dylan	"Subterranean Homesick Blues"	1967
8	Michael Jackson	"Leave Me Alone"	1989
9	a-ha	"Take On Me"	1985
10	Madonna	"Express Yourself"	1989

2021 edition

Rank	Artist	Music video	Year
1	Beyoncé	"Formation"	2016
2	Johnny Cash	"Hurt"	2002
3	Madonna	"Vogue"	1990
4	Childish Gambino	"This Is America"	2018
5	New Order	"The Perfect Kiss"	1985
6	Beastie Boys	"Sabotage"	1994
7	D'Angelo	"Untitled (How Does It Feel?)"	2000
8	Peter Gabriel	"Sledgehammer"	1986
9	Guns N' Roses	"November Rain"	1992
10	Michael Jackson	"Billie Jean"	1983

== Statistics ==
=== Artists with multiple music videos (2021 edition) ===
4 videos

- Beyoncé
- Madonna

3 videos

- Jay-Z

2 videos

- Björk
- Fatboy Slim
- Janet Jackson
- Lady Gaga
- Radiohead

== See also ==
- Rolling Stone's 500 Greatest Songs of All Time
- Rolling Stone's 500 Greatest Albums All Time
- Rolling Stone's 100 Greatest Songwriters of All Time
- Rolling Stone's 100 Greatest Artists of All Time
- Rolling Stone's 200 Greatest Singers of All Time
