= Parra for Cuva =

German musician (born 1991)

- Born: Nicolas Demuth; August 27, 1991 (age 35); Göttingen, Germany
- Origin: Berlin, Germany
- Genre: Electronica
- Occupations: Disc jockey, music producer
- Years active: 2013–present
- Labels: Project Mooncircle; Lenient Tales; Traum Schallplatten; Délicieuse
- Website: parraforcuva.com

Nicolas Demuth (born August 27, 1991), known by stage name Parra for Cuva, is a German musician and DJ. He is best known for his house production.

== Career ==
=== Life and early career ===
Nicolas Demuth grew up in a small town close to Göttingen in the state of Lower Saxony, Germany.

When he was 11 years old he learned to play the piano and became interested in pieces of the French composer Debussy. After his piano teacher changed, he started to be engaged with jazz improvisations, with a focus on the jazz piano. In 2009, Demuth started to print out MIDI piano notes with the help of a simple program, and then mixed his first piano pieces with hip hop elements. After his A-levels Demuth moved to Berlin to study audio design.

He first called himself "Natur-Klang" before he decided to choose the stage name "Parra for Cuva". His stage name originates in words he found in Spanish and Portuguese dictionaries, "parra" and "cuva." In an interview, Demuth claimed that a Spaniard told him at the time he chose it that it could be a girl's name meaning between the world / for / Cuva; he said that listeners are free to take whatever meaning they like.

=== 2013–2014 ===
Nicolas Demuth and Anna Naklab grew up in the same town as neighbors and have been friends ever since their youth. Under the stage name Nianband they published different songs and had some local performances. Demuth took over the piano part whereas Naklab played the guitar and sang. The Nianband's musical focus was based on calm and rather relaxed compositions. In early 2013, Demuth and Naklab published "Fading Nights" on the French label Delicieuse Musique Records, followed by a joint production of "Something Near" on the label Well Done Music! from Berlin.

In September 2013, the cover (remix) single "Wicked Games" was released by Demuth and featured Naklab. The song is a cover version of Chris Isaak's "Wicked Game" and was published on the label Spinnin' Records. "Wicked Games" was released on Beatport, a U.S. based electronica website. A mainstream release in France in October 2013 was followed by a German release in February 2014. The song charted at number 6 in the United Kingdom. The song also charted in France, Belgium, Netherlands and other European nations. This popularity led to Demuth's international breakthrough.

In November 2013, the instrumental single "Luhya" was released on the label Delicieuse Musique Records. November 2013 also brought the Aérotique and Parra for Cuva release of the EP (short track album) titled Unique, with four tracks, on the label Sinnmusik. In February 2014, Demuth along with artist Egokind and Jona Mayr released an EP titled First Chapter, on the label Lenient Tales. Soon after, Demuth, Ascii Code and Viken Arman released the EP titled Veiled in Blue, on the label Traum/TRAUMV179.

=== 2015: Majouré ===
In January 2015, Nicolas Demuths debut album Majouré (French for "superior force") was released on the label Lenient Tales Recordings. It contained twelve songs, with iTunes offering a bonus song. The song "Devi" featured hip hop artist Nieve; the title track "Majouré" featured Casey K; and the song "Champa" features Monsoonsiren. All songs feature distinct foundations of electronic music mixed with a variety of musical influences of other genres.

=== 2016: Darwîś ===
After finishing up their semester at university, Nicolas and Jonas – or Parra for Cuva & Senoy – packed their vehicle full of gear for a roadtrip to Spain where they recorded a new album. Inspired by the natural beauty of Spain's Mediterranean coast, the two were able to make enough content for an album. The duo spent the rest of the year back in Germany, mixing and arranging the pieces they had created. During the recording of the title song, the percussion track was accidentally left to loop, resulting in a trance-inducing meditative sound that gave them the idea for the title.

=== 2017: Mood in C ===
In 2017, Parra for Cuva released the EP Mood in C. Following the album Darwīš together with Senoy on Project Mooncircle, the release is a collection of songs that were created in and around the previous year. The title song "Mood in C" was composed after the Ethiopian pentatonic scale that is deeply intertwined with both the spirituality of the people but also the war-torn and deeply trenched history of the country. Furthermore, it combines guitar effects with synths and all sounds were recorded analog with the help of effects units. The song "Unfinished Colours" together with "Others" is the first collaboration of a future joint project of the two friends. All percussion was either recorded on journeys and travels or at home with everyday objects to give the EP a unique sound.

=== 2018: Paspatou ===
Parra for Cuva released Paspatou, in 2018.

=== 2020: Parra for Cuva and Trashlagoon ===
Parra For Cuva and Trashlagoon collaborated on "Hotel Moonlight". It was buoyed by groovy and emotional textures that further reveal themselves with each subsequent listen.

=== 2021: Juno ===
His fourth album Juno was released on 16 July 2021, for which he recorded with over 15 musicians. The album features collaborations with Bongeziwe Mabandla and Aukai, among others. For the remix of "Her Entrance" Parra for Cuva teamed up with Innellea who was named best newcomer by Groove Magazine in 2017. Innellea's interpretation of "Her Entrance" was shaped by his desire for extensive and intense club nights.

=== 2024: Mimose ===
Parra For Cuva launched his fifth studio album Mimose. This LP draws inspiration from various cultures and landscapes. In addition to the title track ‘Mimose’, the album features notable pieces such as ‘Let It Burn’, ‘Pinie’, and the standout track ‘Stellar’. The latter was conceived during a trip to Corsica, blossoming into a melodic downtempo piece with dreamy undertones, vibrant vocals, and a choir. Parra For Cuva's music fuses a variety of influences, blending elements of classical, jazz, and hip-hop within the Berlin electronic music scene. ‘Mimose’ delves into emotional depths and energetic peaks, featuring uplifting vocals, enchanting bass lines, and collaborative endeavors.

== Music style ==
The songs produced by Nicolas Demuth combine elements of house and pop music, piano compositions and downtempo. Many of his electronic pieces find their origin in piano music through sketches or with the help of complete solo pieces. Artists such as Ludovico Einaudi and Bonobo are Demuth's sources of inspiration next to many others. His set Plains of Ostara starts with Einaudis' piece Andare. Next to the piano many other instruments such as a kalimba, steeldrums, carillons, guitars and accordions can be found in Demuth's productions.

== Discography ==
=== Studio albums ===
| Title | Album details |
|---|---|
| Majouré | Released: 15 January 2015; Label: Lenient Tales Recordings; Formats: vinyl, CD, digital download |
| Darwîś | Released: 27 May 2016; Label: Project Mooncircle; Formats: vinyl, CD, digital download |
| Paspatou | Released: 22 February 2018; Formats: vinyl, digital download |
| Juno | Released: 16 July 2021; Formats: vinyl, digital download |
| Mimose | Released: 19 April 2024; Formats: vinyl, digital download |
| Nacar | Released: 15 may 2026; Formats: vinyl, digital download |

=== Extended plays ===
| Title | Details |
|---|---|
| Fading Nights (feat. Anna Naklab) | Released: 8 May 2013; Label: Deliceuse Records; Formats: digital download |
| Something Near (feat. Anna Naklab) | Released: 21 June 2013; Label: Well Done Musik*; Formats: digital download |
| Luhja | Released: 25 November 2013; Label: Deliceuse Records*; Formats: digital download |
| Unique | Released: 29 November 2013; Label: sinnmusik*; Formats: digital download |
| First Chapter (with Egokind & Jona Mayr) | Released: 21 February 2014; Label: Lenient Tales Recordings; Formats: digital download |
| Veiled in blue(with Ascii Code & Viken Arman) | Released: 4 August 2014; Label: Traum; Formats: digital download |
| Champa | Released: 1 May 2015; Label: Lenient Tales; Formats: digital download |
| Mood in C | Released: 17 February 2017; Label: Project Mooncircle; Formats: digital download |
| Planet Ujou | Released: 19 March 2020; Label: Awal-375; Formats: digital download/Vinyl |

=== Singles ===
| Year | Title | Peak chart positions | | | | | | Certifications | Album |
| Year | Title | GER | AUS | BEL | FRA | NL | UK | Certifications | Album |
|---|---|---|---|---|---|---|---|---|---|
| 2013 | "Fading Nights" (featuring Anna Naklab) | — | — | — | — | — | — | | Non-album single (Note: Non-album singles) |
| 2013 | "Something Near" (featuring Anna Naklab) | — | — | — | — | — | — | | Non-album single |
| 2013 | "Luhya" | — | — | — | — | — | — | | Non-album single |
| 2014 | "Wicked Games" (featuring Anna Naklab) | 89 | 14 | 15 | 71 | 6 | 6 | ARIA: Platinum; BPI: Platinum | Non-album single |
| 2016 | "Sacred Feathers" | — | — | — | — | — | — | | Non-album single |
| 2017 | "Pigment" (Christian Löffler- Reinterpretation by Parra for Cuva) | — | — | — | — | — | — | | Non-album single |
"—" denotes a single that did not chart or was not released in that territory.
