= Belleruche =

British electronic/soul band

- Origin: London, United Kingdom
- Genres: Soul; Trip hop; Electronic
- Years active: 2005–2013 2025-
- Labels: Tru Thoughts Hippoflex Recording Industries
- Members: Kathrin deBoer; Ricky Fabulous; DJ Modest
- Website: www.belleruche.com

Belleruche (/ˌbɛlˈruːʃ/ BEL-ROOSH are a three-piece electronic/soul band from the United Kingdom. They were signed on the Brighton-based Tru Thoughts label from 2007 to 2013. The members of the band are Kathrin deBoer, Ricky Fabulous, and DJ Modest.

The band was formed in North London in 2005.

Belleruche released a series of three limited 7" records on their own Hippoflex Recording Industries label before signing with Tru Thoughts, which sold out in British independent record stores and attracted a cult following in Europe, having been hand-distributed by the band at their gigs.

In 2007 Belleruche signed to Tru Thoughts and their debut album Turntable Soul Music was released in July of the same year, becoming the fastest-selling debut album in the label's history. They have played at venues as diverse as Montreux Jazz Festival, Glastonbury Festival, and many more.

In October 2008 The Express, the band's second album, was released. Their first single, "Anything You Want (Not That)", was awarded the Single Of The Week spot on iTunes. The Express has gained major daytime radio support, being played in rotation by Nemone on BBC 6Music radio.

BBC Radio 2's Mark Lamarr brought them in for a live session for his God's Jukebox show in May 2009.

The band's third album, 270 Stories, was released in October 2010.

Album number four was ‘Rollerchain’, released in 2012.

In spring and summer of 2011, Belleruche's 2008 track "Northern Girls" featured in Mercedes Benz' 125th anniversary television commercials for the United Kingdom. The advert features cars from the manufacturer's ranges over the lifetime of the company jostling and competing to be featured in the celebratory photo-shoot.

The band officially announced end of their existence in October 2013. In a 2018 interview with City Code Magazine, singer Kathrin deBoer stated their ending was too abrupt. "We probably should have managed that better! We all needed a break for different reasons. We self managed and that became a huge job as the band grew and alongside producing music, other parts of our lives were being pretty much neglected, so we needed to re align the priorities."

In June 2025, the band announced that they had recorded new material and would be releasing it over the following months.

== Discography ==
=== Albums ===
- Turntable Soul Music (Tru Thoughts, 2007)
- The Express (Tru Thoughts, 2008)
- The Liberty EP (Tru Thoughts, 2010)
- 270 Stories (Tru Thoughts, 2010)
- Rollerchain (Tru Thoughts, 2012)

=== EPs and singles ===
- Reflection / Bird Mess (Hippoflex Recording Industries, 2005)
- The Itch/13:6:34 (Hippoflex Recording Industries, 2005)
- 4 Songs EP (Hippoflex Recording Industries, 2006)
- Anything You Want (Not that)/Don't Let Them Push You Around (Tru Thoughts, 2008)
- Northern Girls (Tru Thoughts, 2008)
- Clockwatching/Mirror In The Bathroom (Tru Thoughts, 2010)
- Fuzz Face (Tru Thoughts, 2010)
- Limelight / Longer Days, Longer Nights (Tru Thoughts, 2012)

=== Mix CDs ===
- Saint Germain des Prés Café, Vol. 11 - The Belleruche Gramophone Session (Wagram Music, 2007)
