= Trevor Something =

- Born: Clayton Bullard
- Origin: Miami, Florida, U.S.
- Genres: Synthwave, post-punk, new wave, shoegaze, synth-pop, vaporwave, witch house
- Years active: 2013–present
- Label: In Your Brain LLC
- Website: www.trevorsomething.com

Clayton Bullard, better known by his stage name Trevor Something, is an American musician known for creating synthwave music. He creates both original music as well as remixed music through the sampling and mixing of music by other artists.

== Recording career ==
Trevor Something's first single, 'All Night' was released on September 11, 2013. His first LP, titled Synthetic Love was released on January 28, 2014. It was followed up with his first mixtape, Trevor Something Does Not Exist and two EPs, Distorted Reality and Lost Memories later in 2014. His second and third LPs, Death Dream and Soulless Computer Boy and The Eternal Render debuted in 2015 and 2016 respectively. On May 19, 2017, his fourth LP, Die With You was released, featuring a 2005 illustration "The Last Embrace" by artist Laurie Lipton as its cover art. The third EP from Trevor Something, Lost Love was released on June 21, 2018. It was followed by his fifth LP, ULTRAPARANOIA on October 12, 2018. His sixth LP, titled Bots Don't Cry was released on February 15, 2019. On July 19, 2019, Trevor Something debuted his fourth and most recent EP, Escape. His seventh LP, microwaves was released on April 17, 2020. It was quickly followed up with his eighth LP, Deep Wave Data Dark Web Daemons on May 8, 2020. Trevor's ninth LP, Love Me and Leave Me debuted on June 4, 2021. His tenth LP, The Death Of (Trevor Something) was released on March 25, 2022, Followed by his eleventh and currently latest LP, Archetypes, released on January 9th, 2024.

== Discography ==
Since 2013, Trevor Something has debuted 15 albums under his own stage name. He has also performed additional work under different stage names through his record label In Your Brain LLC.

On March 24, 2022, Trevor Something made a social media post which claimed The Death Of would be his last album. The cryptic statement coincides with the creator's apparent intent to depart from his long-held anonymous persona, which is further corroborated within the album's theme, imagery, lyrics, and the use of his given name in the credits and merchandise. Trevor has since produced additional music for three new releases, beginning with My Soul Burns as My Consciousness Is Uploaded into the Virtual Afterlife on July 1, followed by Bury Me in My Loneliness on September 22. Then on December 19, he released Flying with the Angels

=== Trevor Something ===
Fifteen albums.

LPs

- Synthetic Love (2014)
- Death Dream (2015)
- Soulless Computer Boy and the Eternal Render (2016)
- Die with You (2017)
- ULTRAPARANOIA (2018)
- Bots Don't Cry (2019)
- microwaves (2020)
- Deep Wave Data Dark Web Daemons (2020)
- Love Me and Leave Me (2021)
- The Death Of (2022)
- Archetypes (2024)
- The Shadow (2025)
- The Anima (2025)

EPs

- Distorted Reality (2014)
- Lost Memories (2014)
- Lost Love (2018)
- Escape (2019)
- Bury Me in My Loneliness (2022)
- Flying with the Angels (2022)
- Letting Out My Demons (2023)

Mixtape

- Trevor Something Does Not Exist (2014)

=== Others ===
==== Clay Bullet ====
One album.

- Music for the Deaf / Dreaming Under the Influence (2013)

==== Cashous Clay ====
Two albums.

- Uncleared Instrumentals 2 (2013)
- Uncleared Instrumentals 3 (2014)

==== Paranoid Pavement ====
One album.

- 何故 H O W L O N G I S F O R E V E R 万年 (2014)

==== In Your Brain LLC ====
Two albums.

- トレバー何か - T E C H N O P H O B I A テクノフォビア (2015)
- Cry Baby (2019)

==== Hibachi Kid ====
Four albums.

- Enter the Sushi (2015)
- Dream Forever (2017)
- Radiation Mutation (2020)
- Psychedelic Sushi (2026)

==== Staring at Screens ====
Five albums.

- Staring at Screens (2016)
- Fantasy Hotline (2017)
- Room (2020)
- Alien Technology (2023)
- DIGITALGENESIS (2026)

==== sweat shop lsd ====
One album.

- Dead Soul Collage (2016)
