= Holywood Rudolf Steiner School =

Waldorf school located in Holywood, County Down, Northern Ireland

Coordinates: 54.639°N 5.817°W

Information
- Established: 1975; 51 years ago
- Age: 3 to 17
- Website: www.holywood-steiner.co.uk

The Holywood Rudolf Steiner School is a Waldorf school located in Holywood, County Down, Northern Ireland which teaches children using methods inspired by Rudolf Steiner. The school is co-educational, serving ages 3 to 17 with an enrollment of more than 160 students.

== History ==
The school was founded in 1975 in two rooms at the Glencraig Camphill Community at Seahill, just outside Holywood. In the early days the school moved site frequently before moving to its current site at Croft Road in Holywood in 1976. In 1979 a new building which became the school hall was added. In 1993 a new block was built comprising four new classrooms. In 1997, with the help of the National Lottery, a new kindergarten was added. In 2000 another new block of classrooms was completed, again with National Lottery funding.

The school was granted provisional registration as an "independent school" in 1976 and final registration in 1993. The school's application for "maintained status" was turned down in 2006 because the school did not take steps to meet certain statutory and other mandatory requirements. The department made no objections in principle to state funding. During negotiations senior civil servants acknowledged the benefits of breaking the Steiner School into the state sector, and drew parallels with the decision of the State to fund Irish language schools. Officials at the Department of Education in Northern Ireland have followed closely developments in England where the New Labour administration initiated steps to provide state funding for a number of Steiner Schools, a development that came to fruition under the Conservative-Liberal Democrat coalition.

== Integration ==
Holywood's school website contends that it "has some claim to be the first fully integrated school in Northern Ireland since the troubles began as it has had children from different communities sharing their culture, gifts and abilities throughout the school's history."
