= Traum Schallplatten =

German record label

- Founded: 1998
- Founder: Riley Reinhold / Jacqueline Klein
- Genre: Electronic music, Minimal techno
- Country of origin: Germany
- Location: Cologne
- Official website: traumschallplatten.de

Traum Schallplatten (English: Dream Records) is a Cologne-based record label which started as a minimal techno label run by Jacqueline Reinhold (née Klein) and Riley Reinhold (Triple R), but later developed into a melodic techno label. Its sub-labels are Trapez, Trapez Ltd, My Best Friend (MBF), My Best Friend Ltd, Paintwork and Zaubernuss.

== Notable artists ==
- Dominik Eulberg
- Extrawelt
- Ikaro Grati
- Kaiserdisco
- Max Cooper
- Minilogue
- Microtrauma
- Mononoid
- Nick Dow
- Nathan Fake
- Thomas Brinkmann
- Ryan Davis

== Selected Releases ==
=== Albums ===
- Dominik Eulberg Flora & Fauna (TRAUM CD16, 2004)
- Dominik Eulberg Heimische Gefilde (TRAUM CD19, 2007)
- Dominik Eulberg Diorama (TRAUM CD24, 2011)

=== Compilations ===
- Elektronische Musik Aus Buenos Aires (TRAUM CD01, 1999)
- Thomas Brinkmann Tour De Traum (TRAUM CD 15, 2004) (DJ-Mix)
- Tour De Traum series is running non stop and is reaching its 20ths release December 2020
- 100 (TRAUM CD20, 2008)
- Elektronische Musik - Interkontinental Series (1-5) (2001–2006)

=== 12"/EP ===
- Gustavo Lamas Celeste (TRAUM V01, 1999)
- Nathan Fake Dinamo (TRAUM V56, 2005)
- Minilogue Certain Things EP (TRAUM V64, 2005)
- Dominik Eulberg & Gabriel Ananda Harzer Roller (TRAUM V70, 2006)
- Extrawelt Doch Doch (TRAUM V75, 2006)
- Extrawelt Mosaik EP (TRAUM V125, 2010)

== See also ==
- List of record labels
- List of electronic music record labels
