= Rolling Stone's 500 Greatest Songs of All Time =

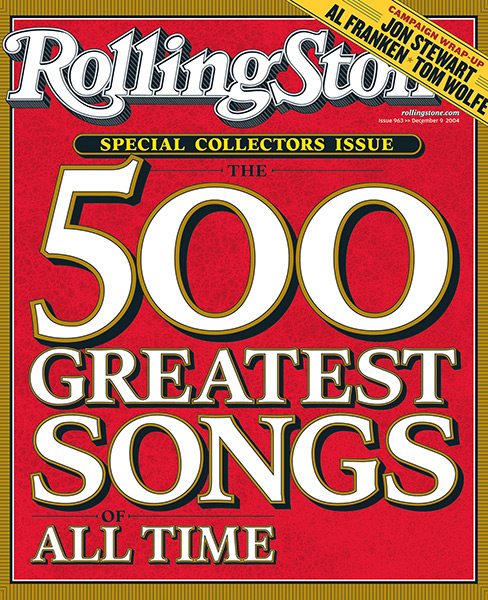
Cover to Rolling Stone issue 963, "500 Greatest Songs of All Time"

"The 500 Greatest Songs of All Time" is a recurring song ranking compiled by the American magazine Rolling Stone. It is based on weighted votes from selected musicians, critics, and industry figures. The first list was published in December 2004 in a special issue of the magazine, issue number 963, a year after the magazine published its list of "The 500 Greatest Albums of All Time". In 2010, Rolling Stone published a revised edition, drawing on the original and a later survey of songs released up until the early 2000s.

Another updated edition of the list was published in 2021, with more than half the entries not having appeared on either of the two previous editions; it was based on a new survey and did not factor in the surveys conducted for the previous lists. The 2021 list was based on a poll of more than 250 artists, musicians, producers, critics, journalists, and industry figures. They each sent in a ranked list of their top 50 songs, and Rolling Stone tabulated the results. In 2024, a revised version of the list was published, with the addition of songs from the 2020s.

== Top 10 songs ==
2004 and 2010 revision

Rank	Artist	Song	Year
1	Bob Dylan	"Like a Rolling Stone"	1965
2	The Rolling Stones	"(I Can't Get No) Satisfaction"	1965
3	John Lennon	"Imagine"	1971
4	Marvin Gaye	"What's Going On"	1971
5	Aretha Franklin	"Respect"	1967
6	The Beach Boys	"Good Vibrations"	1966
7	Chuck Berry	"Johnny B. Goode"	1958
8	The Beatles	"Hey Jude"	1968
9	Nirvana	"Smells Like Teen Spirit"	1991
10	Ray Charles	"What'd I Say"	1959

2021 and 2024 revision

Rank	Artist	Song	Year
1	Aretha Franklin	"Respect"	1967
2	Public Enemy	"Fight the Power"	1989
3	Sam Cooke	"A Change Is Gonna Come"	1964
4	Bob Dylan	"Like a Rolling Stone"	1965
5	Nirvana	"Smells Like Teen Spirit"	1991
6	Marvin Gaye	"What's Going On"	1971
7	The Beatles	"Strawberry Fields Forever"	1967
8	Missy Elliott	"Get Ur Freak On"	2001
9	Fleetwood Mac	"Dreams"	1977
10	Outkast	"Hey Ya!"	2003

== Statistics ==
=== 2004 list ===
- Of the 500 songs, 351 are from the United States and 120 from the United Kingdom; followed by Canada with 13; Ireland with 12 entries (of which 8 were composed by U2); Jamaica with 7; Australia with two (AC/DC); Sweden (ABBA) and France (Daft Punk) each with one.
- The list includes only songs written in English, with the sole exception of "La Bamba" (number 345), sung in Spanish by the American singer-songwriter Ritchie Valens.
- Although the list is "of all time", few songs written prior to the 1950s are included; some that are listed are Robert Johnson's "Crossroads" (1936), in the version recorded by Cream, and Hank Williams' "I'm So Lonesome I Could Cry" (1949). "The House of the Rising Sun", listed in the version by English rock band the Animals, was recorded at least as early as 1934. Muddy Waters' "Rollin' Stone" (1950) is based on an earlier song, dating to the 1920s.
- There is one instrumental on the list: "Green Onions" by the American band Booker T. and the M.G.'s (number 181).
- The number of songs from each of the decades represented in the 2004 version is as follows:

Decade	Songs	Percentage
1940s	1	0.2%
1950s	72	14%
1960s	203	41%
1970s	142	28%
1980s	57	11%
1990s	22	4.4%
2000s	3	0.6%

- The Beatles are the most represented musical act, with 23 songs on the list. John Lennon, Paul McCartney and George Harrison are also represented as solo artists. Lennon is the only artist to appear twice in the top 10, as a member of the Beatles and as a solo artist. The Beatles are followed by the Rolling Stones (14); Bob Dylan (13); Elvis Presley (11); U2 (8); the Beach Boys and Jimi Hendrix (7); Led Zeppelin, Prince, Sly and the Family Stone, James Brown, and Chuck Berry (6); Elton John, Ray Charles, the Clash, the Drifters, Buddy Holly, and the Who (5).
- The artists not included on the list of the top 100 artists but having the most songs featured in the list are the Animals, Blondie, and the Isley Brothers, each with three songs.
- The album with the most entries on the list (excluding compilation albums) is Are You Experienced by the Jimi Hendrix Experience with four songs on the list: "Purple Haze" (number 17), "Foxy Lady" (number 152), "Hey Joe" (number 198) and "The Wind Cries Mary" (number 370).
- Three songs appear on the list twice, performed by different artists: "Mr. Tambourine Man", performed by Bob Dylan (number 107) and by the Byrds (number 79); "Blue Suede Shoes" by Elvis Presley (number 430) and by Carl Perkins (number 95), and "Walk This Way" by Aerosmith (number 346) and by Run-DMC (number 293).
- The shortest tracks are "Rave On!" by Buddy Holly (1:47), "Great Balls of Fire" by Jerry Lee Lewis (1:52), and Eddie Cochran's "C'mon Everybody" (1:53).
- The longest tracks are "The End" by the Doors (11:41), "Desolation Row" by Bob Dylan (11:21), and "Marquee Moon" by Television (9:58).
- Love is the most frequent word used in the songs' lyrics, with 1,057 occurrences, followed by I'm (1,000), oh (847), know (779), baby (746), got (702), and yeah (656).

=== 2010 list ===
In May 2010, Rolling Stone compiled an update, published in a special issue and in digital form for the iPod and iPad. The list differs from the 2004 version, with 26 songs added, all of which are songs from the 2000s except "Juicy" by The Notorious B.I.G., released in 1994. The top 25 remained unchanged, but many songs down the list were given different rankings as a result of the inclusion of new songs, causing consecutive shifts among the songs listed in 2004. The highest-ranked new entry was Gnarls Barkley's "Crazy" (number 100).

The number of songs from each decade in the updated version is as follows:

Decade	Songs	Percentage
1940s	1	0.2%
1950s	68	14%
1960s	196	39%
1970s	131	26%
1980s	55	11%
1990s	22	4.4%
2000s	27	5.4%

- Two songs by U2 and two by Jay-Z were added to the list. Jay-Z performs in two other new songs on the list: "Crazy in Love" by Beyoncé, and "Umbrella" by Rihanna.
- The only artist to have two songs dropped from the list is the Crystals; their "Da Doo Ron Ron" (previously number 114) was the highest-ranked song to have been dropped.

=== 2021 list ===
Decade	Songs	Percentage
1930s	3	0.6%
1940s	4	0.8%
1950s	24	4.8%
1960s	108	22%
1970s	144	29%
1980s	80	16%
1990s	70	14%
2000s	38	8%
2010s	30	6%
2020s	3	0.6%

- The most represented musical act is once again the Beatles (12), followed by Bob Dylan, David Bowie, the Rolling Stones (7), Prince, Beyoncé (6) and Bruce Springsteen (5).
- The album with the most entries on the list (excluding compilation albums) is Born to Run by Bruce Springsteen with three songs on the list: "Born to Run" (number 27), "Thunder Road" (number 111) and "Jungleland" (number 298).
- The most represented year is 1971, with 21 songs from that year in the Top 500, including 6 in the Top 100.
- Daddy Yankee's "Gasolina" was listed as released in 2010 by mistake, when it was released in 2004.
- Six songs were added back to the list after being removed: "Lose Yourself" by Eminem (number 167), "One Nation Under a Groove" by Funkadelic (number 210), "More Than A Feeling" by Boston (number 212), "The Boys are Back in Town" by Thin Lizzy (number 272), "Da Doo Ron Ron" by the Crystals (number 366), and "Lola" by the Kinks (number 386).
- The highest entry for a newly added song is "Dreams" by Fleetwood Mac at number 9.
- The highest entry not in the English language is "Gasolina" by Daddy Yankee at number 50.
- Thirty songs from the 2010s were added, with the highest entry being "Dancing On My Own" by Robyn at number 20.
- The highest entry for a song from 2020 is "Safaera" by Bad Bunny at number 329.
- The highest entry from the previous lists to be excluded is "Hound Dog" by Elvis Presley, originally placed at number 19. The original version by Big Mama Thornton is, however, present at number 318 after being absent from the earlier iterations of the list.
- The longest song on the list is "Walk On By" by Isaac Hayes (12:00) (number 312), and the shortest is "Old Town Road" by Lil Nas X (1:53) (number 490). The live version of "Whipping Post" by the Allman Brothers Band (number 410) is specifically referenced in the article and is 22:40, almost twice as long as any other song on the list if counted.
- Four songs are featured twice on the list, performed by different artists: "Walk On By" by Dionne Warwick (number 51) and Isaac Hayes (number 312), "Gloria" by Them (number 413) and Patti Smith (number 97), "Mr. Tambourine Man" by Bob Dylan (number 164) and the Byrds (number 230) and "Killing Me Softly with His Song" by Roberta Flack (number 273) and Fugees (number 359).

=== 2024 list ===
Decade	Songs	Percentage
1930s	4	0.7%
1940s	4	0.8%
1950s	24	4.8%
1960s	106	21.2%
1970s	141	28.2%
1980s	79	15.8%
1990s	69	13.8%
2000s	38	7.6%
2010s	29	5.8%
2020s	11	2.2%

=== Artists with multiple songs (2024 edition) ===
11 songs

- The Beatles

7 songs

- Beyoncé
- Bob Dylan
- The Rolling Stones

6 songs

- David Bowie
- Prince

5 songs

- Bruce Springsteen

4 songs

- Aretha Franklin
- Marvin Gaye
- Elton John
- Joni Mitchell
- Outkast
- Stevie Wonder

3 songs

- The Beach Boys
- Chuck Berry
- James Brown
- Missy Elliott
- Fleetwood Mac
- Jimi Hendrix
- Michael Jackson
- Jay-Z
- The Kinks
- Led Zeppelin
- Madonna
- Bob Marley and the Wailers
- The Notorious B.I.G.
- Dolly Parton
- Elvis Presley
- Radiohead
- R.E.M.
- Taylor Swift
- U2
- The Who
- Neil Young

2 songs

- Fiona Apple
- Bad Bunny
- Black Sabbath
- The Byrds
- Johnny Cash
- Ray Charles
- The Clash
- Leonard Cohen
- Creedence Clearwater Revival
- Drake
- Dr. Dre
- Eminem
- The Four Tops
- Grateful Dead
- Al Green
- Buddy Holly
- Whitney Houston
- Lil Wayne
- Little Richard
- Martha and the Vandellas
- Curtis Mayfield
- Metallica
- The Miracles
- New Order
- Nirvana
- N.W.A
- Pink Floyd
- Public Enemy
- Queen
- Ramones
- Otis Redding
- The Revolution
- Rihanna
- Sex Pistols
- Simon & Garfunkel
- Sly and the Family Stone
- Patti Smith
- The Smiths
- Britney Spears
- The Supremes
- Talking Heads
- The Temptations
- TLC
- The Velvet Underground
- Kanye West
- Hank Williams
- Bill Withers

== See also ==
- The Rock and Roll Hall of Fame's selection of 500 Songs that Shaped Rock and Roll
- Rockism and poptimism
- Rolling Stone's 500 Greatest Albums of All Time
- Rolling Stone's 100 Greatest Music Videos of All Time
