= Taku Hirano =

- Born: Takuya Hirano; October 22, 1973 (age 53); Osaka, Japan
- Occupations: Musician, record producer
- Instrument: Percussion
- Years active: 1996–present
- Label: Ropeadope Records
- Website: taku.ninja

Takuya Hirano (平野 琢也, Hirano Takuya) (born October 22, 1973, stylized as Taku Hirano) is a Japanese percussionist. He has performed as a solo artist and as one half of the duo Tao Of Sound. He has toured with Fleetwood Mac and Whitney Houston as a percussionist.

== Biography ==
Takuya "Taku" Hirano was born in Osaka, and grew up in Fresno, California and Hong Kong. He attended Hong Kong International School and graduated from Roosevelt School of the Arts at Theodore Roosevelt High School (Fresno), where he studied orchestral percussion, jazz, Afro-Cuban jazz, and salsa music. He then attended Berklee College of Music, studying under Giovanni Hidalgo and Jamey Haddad, graduating in 1995 with a Bachelor of Music as the college's first Hand Percussion principal. He has also studied drum set with Alan Dawson and Leon "Ndugu" Chancler, as well as in Havana, Cuba with Changuito.

As a percussionist, Hirano has toured with Fleetwood Mac, Whitney Houston, Bette Midler, Stevie Nicks, Lionel Richie, Isaac Hayes, Dr. John, Lindsey Buckingham, John Mayer, A.R. Rahman, Hikaru Utada, LeAnn Rimes and with Cirque du Soleil on Michael Jackson: The Immortal World Tour.

Hirano has recorded with Dr. Dre on 2001, Fleetwood Mac, Whitney Houston, Jay-Z, The Temptations, Hikaru Utada, Stevie Nicks, LeAnn Rimes, Josh Groban, Chromeo, Ziggy Marley, Emmanuel Jal, Nelly Furtado and Lionel Richie, in addition to working on major motion picture soundtracks.

As co-founder of the production duo Tao Of Sound, he has worked as a producer and programmer of commercial sound libraries, and remixer for artists such as Kanye West, Kitaro, and The Ahn Trio. Tao of Sound has released four albums under the record label Domo Records: Metro (2010) Ronin- Extended Play (2012), Ronin (2013), and These Times (2016).

Hirano was a columnist for Drum! magazine, a contributor for Modern Drummer magazine a drum clinician, and has served as an artist-in-residence at Carnegie Mellon University, as a teacher at the Thelonious Monk Institute of Jazz, and as a guest lecturer at Loyola University New Orleans College of Music and Fine Arts and New York University Steinhardt. He is a regular visiting artist at Hugh Hodgson School of Music at University of Georgia, and an ongoing regular guest artist, speaker and panelist at his alma mater, Berklee College of Music, where he was awarded the 2026 Alumni Achievement Award, and is a Professor of Practice at Tulane University.

Hirano was listed in Modern Drummer 's Reader's Poll 2014, 2013, and 2012, and Drum!'s Drummies awards 2015 Percussionist of the Year (runner up), 2015 Rock/Pop/Hip-Hop Percussionist (runner-up), 2013 Studio Percussionist (runner-up), 2013 Rock/Pop/Hip-Hop Percussionist (runner-up), 2012 Studio Percussionist (runner-up), 2012 World Percussionist (runner-up), 2011 Percussionist of the Year (runner-up), 2011 Studio Percussionist (runner-up), 2011 Jazz/Fusion Percussionist (runner-up), 2011 Live Performer (runner-up), 2011 Rock/Pop Percussionist of the Year (runner-up), 2010 Rock/Pop Percussionist of the Year, 2009 Rock/Pop Percussionist of the Year, 2008 Percussionist of the Year (runner-up), 2008 Best Worldbeat Percussionist (runner-up), and 2007 Percussion Rising Star.

In 2018 and 2019, Hirano toured with Fleetwood Mac on their An Evening with Fleetwood Mac World Tour. He also served as the percussionist in the house bands for the Fox television shows Showtime at the Apollo and The Four: Battle for Stardom.

Hirano endorses Meinl percussion instruments, Zildjian cymbals, Remo drum heads, Vater Percussion drum sticks, Drum Workshop drums and hardware, and Roland Corporation electronic percussion.

On July 16, 2021, Hirano released his debut single on Ropeadope Records, "Come And Get It" featuring jazz trumpeter Keyon Harrold. On October 1, 2021, Hirano released his debut album "Blu York - Live in NYC" on Ropeadope Records, recorded live at the Nublu Club in New York City in 2020.

== Awards ==
- Berklee College of Music – Alumni Achievement Award (2026)
- ORIGIN Magazine – 100 Top Creatives (2015)
- Modern Drummer Magazine Reader's Poll 2015 – Best Percussionist (Runner-up)
- Modern Drummer Magazine Reader's Poll 2013 – Best Percussionist (Runner-up)
- Modern Drummer Magazine Reader's Poll 2012 – Best Percussionist (Runner-up)
- Drum! Magazine Drummies 2015 – Percussionist of the Year (Runner-up); Rock/Pop/Hip-Hop Percussionist (Runner-up)
- Drum! Magazine Drummies 2013 – Studio Percussionist (Runner-up); Rock/Pop/Hip-Hop Percussionist (Runner-up)
- Drum! Magazine Drummies 2012 – Studio Percussionist (Runner-up); World Percussionist (Runner-up)
- Drum! Magazine Drummies 2011 – Percussionist of the Year (Runner-up); Studio Percussionist (Runner-up); Jazz/Fusion Percussionist (Runner-up); Live Performer (Runner-up); Rock/Pop Percussionist of the Year (Runner-up)
- Drum! Magazine Drummies 2010 – Rock/Pop Percussionist of the Year
- Drum! Magazine Drummies 2009 – Rock/Pop Percussionist of the Year
- Drum! Magazine Drummies 2008 – Percussionist of the Year (Runner-up); Worldbeat Percussionist (Runner-up)
- Drum! Magazine Drummies 2007 – Percussion Rising Star of the Year; Rock/Pop Percussionist (Runner-up)
- Louis Armstrong award
- Musikmesse Frankfurt International Press Awards (M.I.P.A.) 2010 – Best Percussion Instrument Design: Meinl Percussion Taku Hirano Signature Handbale

== Discography ==
=== As Recording Artist ===
- Toyonaka - EP release (Feed Media, Inc. 2026)
- Crystal Forest (Feed Media, Inc. 2026)
- Blu York - Live in NYC (Ropeadope Records / Modern Icon Recordings 2021)
- Come And Get It (feat. Keyon Harrold) - single release (Ropeadope Records / Modern Icon Recordings 2021)

=== With Tao Of Sound ===
- These Times (Domo Records 2016)
- Ronin (Domo Records 2013)
- Ronin- Extended Play (Domo Records 2012)
- Metro (Domo Records 2010)

=== Other artists/projects ===
- Jazz Funk Soul – Simpatico (2025)
- Jennifer Hudson – The Gift of Love (Jennifer Hudson album) (2024)
- Naveen Kumar (musician) – Rhythm of Soils (2024)
- LeAnn Rimes – God's Work (2022)
- Killing Me Softly With His Songs (Documentary Film Score/On-camera) (2022)
- The Masked Singer - The Masked Singer (American season 8) (2022)
- Lionel Richie – Renaissance Deluxe Edition (2021)
- Dumpstaphunk – Where Do We Go From Here (2021)
- Julius Rodriguez – Midnight Sun (2021)
- The Masked Singer - The Masked Singer (American season 5) (2021)
- LeAnn Rimes – Chant: The Human & the Holy (2020)
- Gorden Campbell – Conversations (2020)
- Mike Phillips – Pulling Off The Covers (2020)
- Will Downing – Romantique, Pt. 1 (2019)
- The Bronx, USA (HBO Documentary Film Score/On-camera) (2019)
- Lindsey Buckingham – Solo Anthology: The Best of Lindsey Buckingham (2018)
- iZombie (TV series) – Season 3 (2017)
- Naveen Kumar (musician) – Silence Is Bliss (2015)
- Jessy J – My One and Only One (2015)
- Ziggy Marley – Fly Rasta (2014)
- Chromeo – White Women (2014)
- Hikaru Utada – Utada: In the Flesh 2010 (Concert DVD/Live Album) (2013)
- Dino Soldo – Human (2012)
- Josh Groban – iTunes Live from SoHo (2010)
- American Idol – American Idol (season 8) (2009)
- James Day - Natural Things (2009)
- Lindsey Buckingham – Live at the Bass Performance Hall (Concert DVD/Live Album) (2008)
- Ahn Trio – Lullaby For My Favorite Insomniac (2008)
- Emmanuel Jal – Warchild (2008)
- La Corona (film) (Documentary Film Score) (2008)
- Stevie Nicks – Crystal Visions... The Very Best of Stevie Nicks ("Landslide" and "Edge of Seventeen" live with the Melbourne Symphony Orchestra) (2007)
- Random House of Soul – Random House of Soul (2007)
- Nelly Furtado – Loose (2006)
- Hikaru Utada – Utada United 2006 (Concert DVD/Live Album) (2006)
- Lindsey Buckingham – Soundstage Presents Lindsey Buckingham (Concert DVD/Live Album) (2005)
- Fleetwood Mac – Fleetwood Mac: Live in Boston (Concert DVD/Live Album) (2004)
- Fleetwood Mac – Fleetwood Mac: Destiny Rules (Documentary) (2004)
- Lionel Richie – Encore (2004)
- Lionel Richie – Just for You (2004)
- Hikaru Utada – Utada Hikaru in Budokan 2004: Hikaru no 5 (ヒカルの5, "Hikaru's 5") (Concert DVD/Live Album) (2004)
- Fleetwood Mac – Say You Will Limited Edition (Peacekeeper (Fleetwood Mac song) live from AOL Sessions; Say You Will (Fleetwood Mac song) live from AOL Sessions) (2003)
- Jay-Z – Blueprint 2.1 ("The Watcher 2") (2003)
- Dino Soldo – Thread (2003)
- Biker Boyz (Motion Picture Film Score) (2003)
- WOW Gospel 2003 ("Beautiful" - Brent Jones & The TP Mobb)(2003)
- Dr. Dre featuring Knoc-turn'al: Bad Intentions - UK Release (2002)
- Jay-Z – The Blueprint 2: The Gift & The Curse ("The Watcher 2") (2002)
- Brent Jones (musician) – Beautiful (2002)
- Lionel Richie – Don't Stop The Music (Europe Release CD/Maxi) (2001)
- Lionel Richie – Cinderella (Europe Release CD/Maxi) (2001)
- Hikaru Utada – Utada Hikaru Unplugged (Concert DVD/Live Album) (2001)
- Lucy Pearl – Lucy Pearl (2000)
- Lionel Richie – Renaissance (2000)
- Brent Jones (musician) – Brent Jones & The T.P. Mobb (2000)
- Lucy Pearl – Love & Basketball (Motion Picture Soundtrack) ("Dance Tonight") (2000)
- Dr. Dre – 2001 (1999)
- Dr. Dre – 2001 (Instrumentals Only) (1999)
- Cherokee – I Love You... Me (1999)
- Howard Cosell: Telling It Like It Is – (HBO Documentary Film Score) (1999)
- Vesta Williams – Relationships (1998)
- The Temptations – Phoenix Rising (1998)
- Dawn Robinson – Dr. Dolittle: The Album (Motion Picture Soundtrack) (1998)
- The Tiger Woods Story (HBO Film Score) (1998)
- The Firm (hip hop group) – The Album (The Firm album) (1997)
- Tracie Spencer – Good Burger (Motion Picture Soundtrack) (1997)
- Sonny Liston The Mysterious Life and Death of a Champion (HBO Documentary Film Score) (1995)
- Malcolm X: Make It Plain (PBS Documentary Film Score) (1994)

== Touring credits ==
Taku has been a percussionist on many tours since the late 1990s.

Artist	Tour Name	Date
LeAnn Rimes	Live Dates - North America	January 2025 - July 2026
LeAnn Rimes	Live Dates - U.K. and North America	May 2024 - November 2024
LeAnn Rimes	the story... so far Tour - North America Tour	January 2023 - September 2023
LeAnn Rimes	Joy: The Holiday Show Tour - North America Tour	December 2022
LeAnn Rimes	the story... so far Tour - North America Tour	May 2022 - September 2022
Jake Shimabukuro	Christmas In Hawaii Tour - North America / Hawaiian islands Tour	November 2021 - December 2021
Fleetwood Mac	An Evening with Fleetwood Mac - North America Tour	October 2019 - November 2019
Fleetwood Mac	An Evening with Fleetwood Mac - Australia / New Zealand Tour	August 2019 - September 2019
Fleetwood Mac	An Evening with Fleetwood Mac - Europe / UK Tour	June 2019
Fleetwood Mac	An Evening with Fleetwood Mac - North America Tour	September 2018 - April 2019
Les Nubians	Up Close & Personal Tour - North America	June 2017 - July 2017
Dr. John	Live Dates - North America; New Orleans Jazz & Heritage Festival	April 2017 - December 2017
Bette Midler	Divine Intervention Tour - UK	July 2015
Bette Midler	Divine Intervention Tour - North America	May 2015 - June 2015
Iggy Azalea	The New Classic Promo Dates and Appearances	November 2014
Cirque du Soleil	Michael Jackson: The Immortal World Tour - Japan	June 2013
John Mayer	Born and Raised Promo; New Orleans Jazz & Heritage Festival	April 2013 - May 2013
Cirque du Soleil	Michael Jackson: The Immortal World Tour - UK	October 2012 – May 2013
Cirque du Soleil	Michael Jackson: The Immortal World Tour - Mexico	August 2012 – September 2012
Cirque du Soleil	Michael Jackson: The Immortal World Tour - North America	October 2011 – August 2012
A.R. Rahman	A. R. Rahman Jai Ho Concert: The Journey Home World Tour - Singapore	March 2011
Josh Groban	Illuminations (Josh Groban album) Promo Dates and Appearances	October 2010 – February 2011
A.R. Rahman	A. R. Rahman Jai Ho Concert: The Journey Home World Tour - South Africa	November 2010
A.R. Rahman	A. R. Rahman Jai Ho Concert: The Journey Home World Tour - North America	September 2010
Stevie Nicks	North American Tour	August 2010
A.R. Rahman	A. R. Rahman Jai Ho Concert: The Journey Home World Tour - UK	July 2010
A.R. Rahman	A. R. Rahman Jai Ho Concert: The Journey Home World Tour - North America	June 2010
Shakira	She Wolf Promo Dates and Appearances	April 2010
Hikaru Utada	Utada: In the Flesh 2010 U.S./U.K. Tour	January 2010 – February 2010
Bette Midler	The Showgirl Must Go On Las Vegas Residency	January 2008 – January 2010
Stevie Nicks	Crystal Visions North America Tour	February 2007 – March 2007
Lindsey Buckingham	Under The Skin North America Tour; Live at the Bass Performance Hall	October 2006 – February 2007
Hikaru Utada	Utada United 2006 Japan Tour	July 2006 – August 2006
Stevie Nicks	Gold Dust North America Tour	June 2006 – August 2006
Stevie Nicks	Two Voices North America Tour (with Don Henley)	June 2006
Giorgia	Unplugged Session Tour	November 2005 – January 2006
Stevie Nicks	Australia Tour; Crystal Visions – The Very Best of Stevie Nicks (Live recording with Melbourne Symphony Orchestra)	February 2006 – March 2006
Bette Midler	From the Big Apple to the Big Easy	September 2005
Bette Midler	Kiss My Brass Australia Tour	April 2005 – May 2005
Bette Midler	Kiss My Brass North America Tour	September 2004 – December 2004
Fleetwood Mac	Say You Will Tour - North America	May 2004 – September 2004
Lionel Richie	Just For You European Promo Dates and Appearances	March 2004
Fleetwood Mac	Say You Will Tour - Australia	February 2004 – March 2004
Fleetwood Mac	Say You Will Tour - Europe	November 2003 – December 2003
Fleetwood Mac	Say You Will Tour - North America; Fleetwood Mac: Live in Boston	May 2003 – October 2003
Fleetwood Mac	Say You Will Promo Dates and Appearances	February 2003 – April 2003
Lionel Richie	Promo Dates and Appearances	December 2002 – February 2002
LeAnn Rimes	Promo Dates and Appearances, Jingle Ball	December 2002
Hikaru Utada	Japan Promo Appearances, MTV Unplugged	July 2001
Lionel Richie	Renaissance Europe Tour	April 2001 – May 2001
Lionel Richie	European Tour; Montreux Jazz Festival	July 2000
Lionel Richie	Tina Turner Twenty Four Seven Tour - Europe	July 2000
Lionel Richie	Tina Turner Twenty Four Seven Tour - North America	March 2000 – June 2000
Whitney Houston	My Love Is Your Love World Tour - Europe	August 1999 – November 1999
Whitney Houston	My Love Is Your Love World Tour - North America	June 1999 – July 1999
Isaac Hayes	TV Appearances; Live Dates - North America; New Orleans Jazz & Heritage Festival	October 1998 – April 1999
Kenny Lattimore	South Africa Tour	July 1998
Kenny Lattimore	From The Soul Of Man North America Tour	June 1998
Jonathan Butler	Do You Love Me? Promo Dates and Appearances	October 1997 – April 1998
Puff Daddy	No Way Out Promo Dates and Appearances	August 1997
Kenny Lattimore	For You (Kenny Lattimore song) Tour	May 1997 – September 1997
Tevin Campbell	Back to the World Japan Tour; South Africa Tour	November – December 1996
Tevin Campbell	Back to the World Promo Dates and Appearances	September 1996
