= Say You Will Tour =

2003–2004 concert tour by Fleetwood Mac

- Tour by Fleetwood Mac
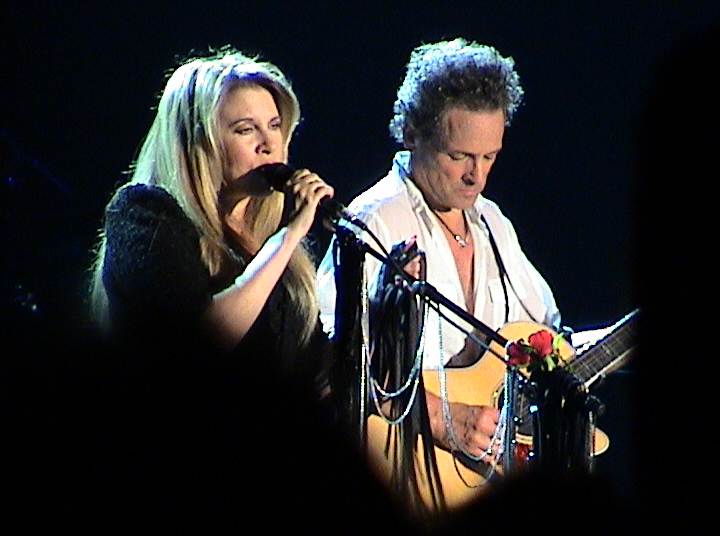
- Stevie Nicks and Lindsey Buckingham on the Say You Will Tour, 2003
- Associated album: Say You Will
- Start date: May 7, 2003
- End date: September 14, 2004
- Legs: 5
- No. of shows: 137

Fleetwood Mac concert chronology
- The Dance Tour (1997); Say You Will Tour (2003/04); Unleashed (2009)

The Say You Will Tour was a concert tour by the rock band Fleetwood Mac in support of their 2003 album Say You Will. It ran from May 7, 2003, to September 14, 2004, and consisted of over 100 shows in the United States, Canada, Germany, Ireland, the United Kingdom, and Australia.

The tour DVD set Live In Boston was filmed at the Fleet Center in Boston on September 23 and 24, 2003. Their 10 December 2003 performance in the UK was attended by Christine McVie, a former member of Fleetwood Mac who left the band in 1998. The tour grossed $69.2 million in 2003 making it the 4th highest grossing US tour of the year. In 2004, it grossed a further $27.7 million from 38 shows and was the 21st highest grossing US tour of that year.

Several touring musicians accompanied the band on stage, including Steve Rinkov, who served as Mick Fleetwood's drum tech. Rinkov was asked to play on a few songs after Fleetwood overheard him playing during a rehearsal. One song on the Say You Will album included two separate drum tracks, so Buckingham suggested that Rinkov cover the second drum part on stage. Rinkov ultimately played additional drums on three songs for each leg of the tour. Buckingham reflected in an interview that the tour was a "triumph" for him and speculated that there was "probably way too much testosterone on stage for Stevie."

== Shows ==
List of concerts, showing date, city, country, venue, tickets sold, number of available tickets and amount of gross revenue
Date	City	Country	Venue	Attendance	Revenue
North America
May 7, 2003	Columbus	United States	Schottenstein Center	11,637 / 11,637	$920,070
May 9, 2003	Washington, D.C.	United States	MCI Center	12,126 / 12,126	$1,458,432
May 10, 2003	Pittsburgh	United States	Mellon Arena	12,126 / 12,126	$1,095,646
May 13, 2003	Cleveland	United States	Gund Arena	9,752 / 11,252	$835,972
May 15, 2003	Buffalo	United States	HSBC Arena	12,393 / 13,348	$775,199
May 17, 2003	Atlantic City	United States	Boardwalk Hall	12,748 / 12,748	$1,297,652
May 19, 2003	Philadelphia	United States	First Union Center	16,795 / 16,795	$1,563,275
May 21, 2003	Albany	United States	Pepsi Arena	9,296 / 9,296	$637,485
May 23, 2003	Uniondale	United States	Nassau Coliseum	13,410 / 13,410	$1,340,948
May 25, 2003	East Rutherford	United States	Continental Airlines Arena	14,822 / 14,822	$1,522,070
May 27, 2003	Worcester	United States	Worcester's Centrum Centre	22,875 / 22,875	$2,012,376
May 28, 2003	Worcester	United States	Worcester's Centrum Centre	22,875 / 22,875	$2,012,376
May 31, 2003	Nashville	United States	Gaylord Entertainment Center	10,563 / 10,563	$748,273
June 1, 2003	Greenville	United States	Bi-Lo Center	10,657 / 10,657	$874,622
June 3, 2003	Atlanta	United States	Philips Arena	12,656 / 12,656	$1,108,443
June 5, 2003	Birmingham	United States	BJCC Arena	10,160 / 11,063	$735,253
June 7, 2003	Sunrise	United States	Office Depot Center	12,323 / 12,323	$1,146,121
June 8, 2003	Tampa	United States	St. Pete Times Forum	9,471 / 11,199	$719,224
June 12, 2003	Auburn Hills	United States	The Palace of Auburn Hills	13,931 / 13,931	$1,192,629
June 14, 2003	Grand Rapids	United States	Van Andel Arena	10,929 / 10,929	$1,003,215
June 19, 2003	Saint Paul	United States	Xcel Energy Center	25,271 / 25,271	$2,300,763
June 20, 2003	Saint Paul	United States	Xcel Energy Center	25,271 / 25,271	$2,300,763
June 22, 2003	Moline	United States	The MARK of the Quad Cities	8,628 / 10,378	$640,045
June 24, 2003	Indianapolis	United States	Conseco Fieldhouse	9,613 / 11,894	$711,800
June 26, 2003	Rosemont	United States	Allstate Arena	28,416 / 28,416	$2,522,717
June 27, 2003	Rosemont	United States	Allstate Arena	28,416 / 28,416	$2,522,717
June 29, 2003	Milwaukee	United States	Marcus Amphitheater	22,999 / 22,999	$1,112,150
July 1, 2003	Oklahoma City	United States	Ford Center	15,674 / 15,674	$1,415,276
July 3, 2003	Dallas	United States	American Airlines Center	13,932 / 13,932	$1,102,137
July 5, 2003	Paradise	United States	MGM Grand Garden Arena	12,220 / 12,220	$1,842,900
July 6, 2003	Sacramento	United States	ARCO Arena	15,239 / 15,239	$1,330,123
July 8, 2003	San Jose	United States	HP Pavilion at San Jose	—N/a	—N/a
July 11, 2003	Los Angeles	United States	Staples Center	—N/a	—N/a
July 12, 2003	Los Angeles	United States	Staples Center	—N/a	—N/a
July 16, 2003	Anaheim	United States	Arrowhead Pond of Anaheim	—N/a	—N/a
July 17, 2003	Anaheim	United States	Arrowhead Pond of Anaheim	—N/a	—N/a
July 19, 2003	San Diego	United States	San Diego Sports Arena	9,906 / 9,906	$783,695
July 21, 2003	Phoenix	United States	America West Arena	10,201 / 10,201	$1,100,495
July 23, 2003	Oakland	United States	Oakland Arena	8,856 / 10,266	$830,768
July 25, 2003	Portland	United States	Rose Garden Arena	11,722 / 11,722	$1,177,810
July 26, 2003	Auburn	United States	White River Amphitheatre	11,874 / 13,630	$1,064,889
July 29, 2003	Nampa	United States	Idaho Center	—N/a	—N/a
August 1, 2003	Reno	United States	Lawlor Events Center	8,151 / 9,877	$710,596
August 2, 2003	Salt Lake City	United States	Delta Center	—N/a	—N/a
August 5, 2003	El Paso	United States	Don Haskins Center	7,933 / 8,933	$608,495
August 7, 2003	Lubbock	United States	United Spirit Arena	7,990 / 9,297	$553,868
August 9, 2003	Bossier City	United States	CenturyTel Center	10,236 / 11,142	$813,982
August 10, 2003	Memphis	United States	Pyramid Arena	—N/a	—N/a
August 13, 2003	St. Louis	United States	Savvis Center	9,488 / 11,855	$591,775
August 15, 2003	Kansas City	United States	Kemper Arena	11,050 / 12,952	$778,843
August 16, 2003	Cincinnati	United States	Riverbend Music Center	7,630 / 9,781	$588,313
August 19, 2003	Grand Forks	United States	Alerus Center	7,808 / 11,800	$442,710
September 6, 2003	Biloxi	United States	Mississippi Coast Coliseum	9,579 / 9,579	$848,965
September 7, 2003	Duluth	United States	Arena at Gwinnett Center	8,017 / 9,910	$543,760
September 10, 2003	Greensboro	United States	Greensboro Coliseum Complex	9,639 / 11,687	$590,111
September 12, 2003	Knoxville	United States	Thompson–Boling Arena	9,188 / 11,188	$606,096
September 13, 2003	Chicago	United States	United Center	11,250 / 12,869	$1,014,998
September 17, 2003	Clarkston	United States	DTE Energy Music Theatre	10,581 / 15,202	$631,290
September 20, 2003	Toronto	Canada	Air Canada Centre	13,471 / 13,471	$1,030,835
September 21, 2003	Wantagh	United States	Tommy Hilfiger at Jones Beach Theater	11,735 / 13,944	$858,980
September 23, 2003	Boston	United States	Fleet Center		
September 24, 2003	Boston	United States	Fleet Center	13,100 / 14,609	$1,020,897
September 27, 2003	Bridgeport	United States	Arena at Harbor Yard	8,262 / 8,262	$993,506
September 28, 2003	Philadelphia	United States	First Union Center	12,265 / 15,000	$820,550
September 30, 2003	New York City	United States	Madison Square Garden	11,418 / 13,208	$1,159,745
October 2, 2003	Washington, D.C.	United States	MCI Center	10,283 / 12,045	$801,715
October 5, 2003	San Antonio	United States	SBC Center	9,498 / 11,529	$580,414
October 6, 2003	Houston	United States	Toyota Center	11,790 / 14,158	$891,183
October 9, 2003	Omaha	United States	Qwest Center	13,425 / 13,425	$1,062,185
October 11, 2003	Denver	United States	Pepsi Center	15,480 / 15,480	$1,363,151
October 13, 2003	Los Angeles	United States	Staples Center	9,520 / 11,069	$874,029
October 15, 2003	Bakersfield	United States	Centennial Garden Arena	9,023 / 9,023	$896,335
October 18, 2003	Paradise	United States	MGM Grand Garden Arena	8,682 / 10,602	$978,190
Europe
November 9, 2003	Frankfurt	Germany	Festhalle		
November 10, 2003	Berlin	Germany	Max Schmeling-Halle		
November 13, 2003	Oberhausen	Germany	Konig-Pilsener Arena		
November 16, 2003	Kiel	Germany	Ostseehalle		
November 19, 2003	Dublin	Ireland	Point Theatre		
November 20, 2003	Dublin	Ireland	Point Theatre		
November 22, 2003	Newcastle	England	Telewest Arena		
November 25, 2003	Birmingham	England	NEC Arena		
November 26, 2003	Birmingham	England	NEC Arena		
November 29, 2003	London	England	Earls Court	23,413 / 23,413	$2,046,948
November 30, 2003	London	England	Earls Court	23,413 / 23,413	$2,046,948
December 3, 2003	Manchester	England	Manchester Evening News Arena		
December 4, 2003	Manchester	England	Manchester Evening News Arena		
December 7, 2003	Glasgow	Scotland	SECC Arena		
December 8, 2003	Belfast	Northern Ireland	Odyssey Arena		
December 10, 2003	London	England	Earls Court	15,561 / 15,608	$1,364,632
Australia
February 16, 2004	Newcastle	Australia	Newcastle Entertainment Centre		
February 19, 2004	Brisbane	Australia	Brisbane Entertainment Centre		
February 20, 2004	Brisbane	Australia	Brisbane Entertainment Centre		
February 23, 2004	Melbourne	Australia	Rod Laver Arena		
February 24, 2004	Melbourne	Australia	Rod Laver Arena		
February 27, 2004	Perth	Australia	WACA Grounds		
February 28, 2004	Perth	Australia	WACA Grounds		
March 2, 2004	Adelaide	Australia	Adelaide Oval		
March 4, 2004	Sydney	Australia	Sydney Entertainment Centre		
March 6, 2004	Sydney	Australia	Sydney Entertainment Centre		
March 7, 2004	Sydney	Australia	Sydney Entertainment Centre		
North America
May 8, 2004	Madison	United States	Kohl Center	12,340 / 14,000	$1,099,650
May 9, 2004	Champaign	United States	Assembly Hall	6,247 / 7,500	$622,235
May 12, 2004	Green Bay	United States	Resch Center		
May 14, 2004	Nashville	United States	AmSouth Amphitheatre	7,169 / 17,279	$360,059
May 15, 2004	Atlanta	United States	Chastain Park Amphitheater	6,665 / 6,665	$749,212
May 18, 2004	West Palm Beach	United States	Sound Advice Amphitheatre	11,516 / 19,271	$565,071
May 20, 2004	Charlotte	United States	Verizon Wireless Amphitheatre	9,093 / 18,812	$397,981
May 22, 2004	Raleigh	United States	Alltel Pavilion at Walnut Creek	12,848 / 20,000	$614,013
May 23, 2004	Jacksonville	United States	Veterans Memorial Arena	10,664 / 12,648	$789,375
May 28, 2004	Mansfield	United States	Tweeter Center	12,805 / 16,669	$829,351
May 29, 2004	Holmdel	United States	PNC Bank Arts Center	10,531 / 16,944	$777,775
June 6, 2004	Wantagh	United States	Tommy Hilfiger at Jones Beach Theater	10,141 / 13,899	$750,173
June 8, 2004	Hartford	United States	New England Dodge Music Center	16,758 / 24,190	$641,122
June 10, 2004	Scranton	United States	Ford Pavilion	10,377 / 17,521	$565,427
June 12, 2004	Hershey	United States	Hersheypark Stadium	12,856 / 16,466	$750,438
June 13, 2004	Cuyahoga Falls	United States	Blossom Music Center	9,699 / 18,000	$577,819
June 16, 2004	Dallas	United States	Smirnoff Music Center		
June 17, 2004	The Woodlands	United States	Cynthia Woods Mitchell Pavilion	20,944 / 21,291	$491,561
June 20, 2004	Irvine	United States	Verizon Wireless Amphitheatre	13,543 / 16,243	$941,655
June 22, 2004	Chula Vista	United States	Coors Amphitheatre	9,066 / 19,492	$707,249
June 24, 2004	Fresno	United States	Save Mart Center	7,417 / 9,373	$660,840
June 26, 2004	Marysville	United States	Sleep Train Amphitheatre		
June 27, 2004	Concord	United States	Chronicle Pavilion		
June 29, 2004	San Jose	United States	HP Pavilion		
July 1, 2004	Auburn	United States	White River Amphitheatre		
July 3, 2004	Spokane	United States	Spokane Arena	6,643 / 7,656	$598,979
July 5, 2004	Ridgefield	United States	The Amphitheatre at Clark County		
July 7, 2004	Calgary	Canada	Saddledome		
July 9, 2004	Bozeman	United States	Brick Breeden Fieldhouse		
July 11, 2004	Englewood	United States	Fiddler's Green		
July 13, 2004	Sioux City	United States	Tyson Events Center		
July 14, 2004	Cedar Falls	United States	UNI Dome	6,545 / 16,000	
July 17, 2004	Santa Ynez	United States	Chumash Casino Resort		
July 18, 2004	Santa Ynez	United States	Chumash Casino Resort		
September 10, 2004	Atlantic City	United States	Borgata Event Center		
September 12, 2004	Camden	United States	Tweeter Center	12,963 / 24,934	$566,576
September 14, 2004	Clarkston	United States	DTE Energy Music Theatre		

== Setlists ==
Most shows on the tour used one of two setlists, the first of which was used on the first four legs, and the second of which was used on the final leg.

=== Setlist 1 ===
1. "The Chain"
2. "Dreams"
3. "Eyes of the World"
4. "Peacekeeper"
5. "Second Hand News"
6. "Say You Will"
7. "Never Going Back Again"
8. "Rhiannon"
9. "Come"
10. "Gypsy"
11. "Big Love"
12. "Landslide"
13. "Say Goodbye"
14. "What's the World Coming To"
15. "Beautiful Child"
16. "Gold Dust Woman"
17. "I'm So Afraid"
18. "Silver Springs"
19. "Tusk"
20. "Stand Back"
21. "Go Your Own Way"

Encore 1:

1. "World Turning"
2. "Don't Stop"

Encore 2:

1. "Goodbye Baby"

=== Setlist 2 ===
Setlist 2, used later in the tour, made the following changes:

- Song #3 -- "I Know I'm Not Wrong" was played in place of "Eyes of the World"
- Song #10 -- "Sara" was played in place of "Gypsy"
- Song #14 -- "Red Rover" was played in place of "What's the World Coming To"
- Song #18 -- "Silver Springs" was dropped entirely

== Personnel ==
=== Fleetwood Mac ===
- Lindsey Buckingham – lead guitar, vocals
- Stevie Nicks – vocals, tambourine
- John McVie – bass guitar
- Mick Fleetwood – drums, percussion

=== Supporting members ===
- Sharon Celani – backing vocals
- Mindy Stein – backing vocals through September 28, 2003
  (left due to pregnancy)
- Jana Anderson – backing vocals after September 28, 2003
- Carlos Rios – guitar
- Neale Heywood – guitar, backing vocals
- Brett Tuggle – keyboards, guitar, samples, backing vocals
- Steve Rinkov – drums on "Eyes of the World", "I Know I'm Not Wrong", "Come", and "Tusk"
- Taku Hirano – percussion
- Michael Dean – keyboards on "The Chain", "Dreams", "Eyes of the World", "Peacekeeper", "Second Hand News", "What's the World Coming To", "Beautiful Child", "Gold Dust Woman", "Tusk", "Stand Back", "Go Your Own Way", "World Turning", "Don't Stop" and "Goodbye Baby".
- Michael Bernard – keyboards/samples on "The Chain", "Dreams", "Eyes of the World", "Peacekeeper", "Second Hand News", "What's the World Coming To", "Beautiful Child", "Gold Dust Woman", "Tusk", "Stand Back", "Go Your Own Way", "World Turning", "Don't Stop" and "Goodbye Baby".
  (after Michael Dean's exit from the tour after the first tour leg)
