= Thrown Down =

Promotional single by Fleetwood Mac

from the album Say You Will
- Released: November 2003
- Recorded: 2001 – 2002
- Studio: The Bellagio House
- Length: 4:02
- Label: Reprise
- Songwriter: Stevie Nicks
- Producer: Lindsey Buckingham

"Thrown Down" is a song by British–American rock band Fleetwood Mac. It was written by Stevie Nicks and considered for her 2001 solo album Trouble in Shangri-La but was withdrawn from consideration. The song was later reworked for Fleetwood Mac's 2003 album Say You Will as the fourth track on the album. After the release of Say You Will, "Thrown Down" was also issued as a promotional single.

== Composition ==
John Shanks, who served as one of the producers for Nicks' Trouble in Shangri-La album, recalled that "Thrown Down" was among the first songs that she presented to him along with "Planets of the Universe". Nicks mentioned in interviews with Classic Rock magazine and the band's Destiny Rules documentary that she wrote the song about Lindsey Buckingham when they were touring in support of The Dance and how "the barricades of time have always gotten in our way."

Nicks felt that the lyric "You're not like other people/You do what you want to", which she directed at Buckingham, encapsulated his sensibilities. She added that "it's terrific that [Buckingham] continues to be a well of inspiration" and that "he loves the fact that I write about him." Buckingham commented in the band's Destiny Rules documentary that it was "odd singing all of this stuff about myself" and that he attempted to disassociate from the source material and act professionally when singing the lyrics.

Buckingham and Nicks engaged in some disagreements over the grammatical tense of "Thrown Down's" lyrics, which was shown in the Destiny Rules documentary. During one of their exchanges, Buckingham insisted that it was an established rule not to change between different tenses and suggested the idea of adjusting the lyrics to put them in the third person perspective. After Nicks cited Bob Dylan as an example of someone willing to defy those rules, Buckingham responded that her lyrics were "not as abstract as [what] Bob Dylan would write in those situations."

== Recording ==
According to Buckingham, "Thrown Down" had previously gone through "about three different times with three different producers and never made it anywhere. It was supposed to go on a solo album. It was just obvious to me it needed a guitar riff in the chorus. It was a fairly simple thing, for some reason. There seems to be an understanding between us as to what to do." To achieve some of the guitar tones on "Thrown Down", Buckingham recorded his Gibson Les Paul to a tape machine slowed down by a half step, which he then sped up to make the instrument sound "sweeter" and "miniature". He used this technique during the chorus, where he tripled his part with "little speed tweaks on either side of the correct pitch".

When selecting individuals to mix the album, Buckingham and Nicks came to an agreement to each submit a track to the other's preferred candidate. Buckingham wanted Mark Needham to mix Say You Will, so he joined the band in the studio to develop a mix of "Thrown Down". Both Nicks and Buckingham initially expressed satisfaction with what Needham created, with the former calling it "terrific". She then offered a few suggestions to align the song with what she envisioned. Nicks later expressed reservations with the mix and felt that she was unable to connect with the song, so she suggested bringing in Chris Lord-Alge to attempt a mix of "Thrown Down". Needham was ultimately responsible for the final mix found on Say You Will.

== Release ==
Along with "Peacekeeper", a soundbite of "Thrown Down" was made available on the Star Tribune's website. During the week of 10 November 2003, "Thrown Down" was serviced to AC, Hot AC and AAA radio stations. A few weeks later, Radio and Records listed "Thrown Down" as one of the most added songs to AAA radio stations.

== Personnel ==
- Stevie Nicks – lead vocals
- Lindsey Buckingham – guitars, backing vocals
- John McVie – bass guitar
- Mick Fleetwood – drums, percussion
