= One Man Show =

One Man Show may refer to:

- One Man Show (album), by Lindsey Buckingham
- One Man Show (film), 2001 Indian Malayalam-language comedy-drama
- One Man Show (Lord Kossity), 1996 EP
- "One Man Show", a 2008 song by Jonas Brothers from A Little Bit Longer

== See also ==
- A One Man Show, Grace Jones music video collection
- Solo performance, sometimes called a "one man show" or a "one person show".
- Solo show (disambiguation)
