= Live at the Bass Performance Hall =

Live album by Lindsey Buckingham
- Released: March 25, 2008
- Recorded: January 27, 2007
- Venue: Bass Performance Hall (Fort Worth, Texas)
- Genre: Rock
- Label: Reprise/Warner Music Group
- Producer: Lindsey Buckingham, Rob Cavallo

Lindsey Buckingham chronology
Under the Skin (2006)	Live at the Bass Performance Hall (2008)	Gift of Screws (2008)

Professional ratings
Review scores
Source	Rating
AllMusic	4/5 stars

Live at the Bass Performance Hall is a live album by Fleetwood Mac guitarist/vocalist Lindsey Buckingham. It was released on March 25, 2008, on DVD and a CD/DVD combo. The performances were recorded at the Bass Performance Hall in Fort Worth, Texas on January 27, 2007, when Buckingham and his backing band were on tour promoting the Under the Skin album. Live at the Bass Performance Hall peaked at #186 on the Billboard 200 album chart in March 2008.

== Track listing ==
All tracks written by Buckingham except where noted.

=== CD ===
1. "Not Too Late" – 6:38
2. "Trouble" – 4:22
3. "Never Going Back Again" – 3:37
4. "Second Hand News" – 3:42
5. "Cast Away Dreams" – 4:33
6. "It Was You" – 3:17
7. "Big Love" – 3:29
8. "Go Insane" – 4:47
9. "Under the Skin" – 4:05
10. "I'm So Afraid" – 9:14
11. "I Know I'm Not Wrong" – 4:11
12. "Go Your Own Way" – 6:57
13. "Holiday Road" – 3:11
14. "Show You How" – 4:49
15. "Shut Us Down" (Buckingham, Sipper) – 6:04

=== DVD ===
1. "Not Too Late"
2. "Trouble"
3. "Never Going Back Again"
4. "Second Hand News"
5. "Cast Away Dreams"
6. "It Was You"
7. "Big Love"
8. "Go Insane"
9. "Under the Skin"
10. "I'm So Afraid"
11. "I Know I'm Not Wrong"
12. "Tusk"
13. "Go Your Own Way"
14. "Holiday Road"
15. "Show You How"
16. "Shut Us Down'

DVD only bonus: "Not Too Late" documentary

== Personnel ==
- Lindsey Buckingham - Guitar, lead vocals
- Brett Tuggle - Bass, guitar, keyboards, vocals
- Neale Heywood - Guitar, vocals
- Taku Hirano - Drums, percussion
- Lindsay Vannoy - Additional keyboards
