= Red Rover (song) =

Song by Fleetwood Mac

from the album Say You Will
- Recorded: 1995–2002
- Studio: Ocean Way, Hollywood
- Length: 3:58
- Label: Reprise
- Songwriter: Lindsey Buckingham
- Producers: Lindsey Buckingham; Rob Cavallo

"Red Rover" is a Fleetwood Mac song written and sung by Lindsey Buckingham. It first appeared as the sixth track on the band's 2003 studio album Say You WIll after initially being recorded for one of Buckingham's solo albums. Buckingham has since performed the song live on tour both as a solo artist and a member of Fleetwood Mac.

== Background ==
Buckingham wrote "Red Rover" with the idea of creating a song with "one guitar doing all the work, with some edges on it." He aimed to create a guitar part that would "cover so much ground" and underpin the entire track. Commenting on "Red Rover", Buckingham said that there was "a lot of stuff going on, but it's not too loud. It's kind of a rumble underneath. It's all about letting the guitar part have so much presence and melodicism on its own that I just let it do its thing and then find a melody to go over that."

Buckingham remarked that the song was "probably sped up a little" and that "people either like that or they don't." He doubled the acoustic guitar track, slowed the guitars down, and then bounced the audio to a different track, where he oscillated the part with a fader in time with the rest of the music. Buckingham compared the sound he achieved to gated effects found on 1980s records. He also wanted the guitars to supplant the role that a drum kit would otherwise provide, adding that he "had to slow the tape machine way down to get the rhythmic manipulations as precise as possible." The song's refrain of "red rover/we come to take you over" is a modification of a phrase found in the children's game of Red Rover."

Buckingham listed "Red Rover" as his favorite track from the Say You Will album in a 2004 interview with The Sunday Mail, saying that it was "about a simple guitar part doing the work of the whole rhythm track to a great degree. That's the kind of thing that interests me at the moment." He also identified "Red Rover" as one of the songs on Say You Will that was "more adventuresome than anything we've ever done." When asked by Devon Ivie of Vulture to name the nerdiest song in his discography, Buckingham cited "Red Rover" as one example.

== Critical reception ==
Julian Cole of The Yorkshire Evening Press called "Red Rover" a "lovely, frantic" song that was "one of the standout tracks" on Say You Will. Barney Hoskyns of Uncut felt that the song's "heady melodicism and thrilling hyper-syncopation" were "really intoxicating." Writing for Tulsa World, Thomas Conner described "Red Rover" as "an eerie but compelling song" with "tinny" guitars that "sounded as if they're being transmitted from the netherworld." In their review for Say You Will, Tom Moon of The Philadelphia Inquirer said that the song was "perhaps this too-long album's masterwork". He highlighted the song's "choppy, percussively strummed guitar chorale" with a "soaring refrain unlike anything in the Mac canon."

== Live performances ==
"Red Rover" was one of the songs played on the final leg of the band's Say You Will Tour. During this tour, Buckingham would preface "Red Rover" by saying that the song was written from the perspective of polytheistic deities who are observing mankind in dismay from Mount Olympus and determining whether it was "time to pull the plug" on their experiment.

He had rehearsed the song with Fleetwood Mac in 2003 and mentioned that the song was "interesting to do live. We've got three guitar players running through this vibrato on/off thing, and the on/off is tied into a specific click. And we have to play to that click or the timing's all off, so we're working it all out and it's pretty trippy." Buckingham encountered issues with the guitar tuning during the band's performance at the Meadows Music Theatre, which required him to restart the song. Buckingham played "Red Rover" during his Soundstage performance in 2005. The performance was later issued on DVD the following year,, which featured Buckingham's performance of "Red Rover". He also included the song in the setlist for his 2007 tour promoting his Under the Skin album.
