= Fleetwood Mac: Live in Boston =

2004 video album by Fleetwood Mac

Video by Fleetwood Mac
- Released: 15 June 2004
- Recorded: 23–24 September 2003
- Venues: FleetCenter (Boston, MA)
- Genre: Rock
- Label: Warner Reprise Video
- Producer: Joe Thomas

Fleetwood Mac chronology
Say You Will (2003)	Fleetwood Mac: Live in Boston (2004)	The Essential Fleetwood Mac (2007)

Professional ratings
Review scores
Source	Rating
AllMusic	3.5/5 stars

Live in Boston is a live performance video/music album by British-American rock band Fleetwood Mac, released on 15 June 2004. The concert was filmed on 23–24 September 2003 at the FleetCenter (now known as the TD Garden) in Boston, Massachusetts during the group's Say You Will Tour. The concert is a double DVD set, and also comes with a sampler CD, containing the audio of ten songs from the show. Part of WTTW's Soundstage series also chronicled Buckingham and Nicks solo in 2005 and 2008 respectively.

== DVD track listing ==
=== DVD 1 ===
1. "The Chain" (Lindsey Buckingham, Mick Fleetwood, Christine McVie, John McVie, Stevie Nicks)
2. "Dreams" (Nicks)
3. "Eyes of the World" (Buckingham)
4. "Peacekeeper" (Buckingham)
5. "Second Hand News" (Buckingham)
6. "Say You Will" (Nicks)
7. "Never Going Back Again" (Buckingham)
8. "Rhiannon" (Nicks)
9. "Come" (Buckingham)
10. "Gypsy" (Nicks)
11. "Big Love" (Buckingham)
12. "Landslide" (Nicks)

=== DVD 2 ===
1. "Say Goodbye" (Buckingham)
2. "What's the World Coming To" (Buckingham)
3. "Beautiful Child" (Nicks)
4. "Gold Dust Woman" (Nicks)
5. "I'm So Afraid" (Buckingham)
6. "Silver Springs" (Nicks)
7. "Tusk" (Buckingham)
8. "Stand Back" (Nicks)
9. "Go Your Own Way" (Buckingham)
10. "World Turning" (C. McVie, Buckingham)++
11. "Don't Stop" (C. McVie)
12. "Goodbye Baby" (Nicks)

++ Does not appear in the Soundstage episode that aired on PBS.

== CD track listing ==
The following songs are included on a CD that comes with the double DVD set.

1. "Eyes of the World" – 3:28
2. "Dreams" – 4:28
3. "Rhiannon" – 5:17
4. "Come" – 8:24
5. "Big Love" – 3:01
6. "Landslide" – 4:15
7. "Silver Springs" – 5:25
8. "I'm So Afraid" – 9:39
9. "Stand Back" – 6:44
10. "Go Your Own Way" – 7:16

== Selections from Live in Boston ==
The following tracks are available for download from most download services.

=== Vol. 1 ===
1. "The Chain"
2. "Say You Will"
3. "Never Going Back Again"
4. "Don't Stop"

=== Vol. 2 ===
1. "Gypsy"
2. "Second Hand News"
3. "Peacekeeper"
4. "Goodbye Baby"

== Personnel ==
Fleetwood Mac:

- Stevie Nicks – vocals, tambourine
- Lindsey Buckingham – lead guitar, vocals
- John McVie – bass guitar
- Mick Fleetwood – drums, percussion, additional vocals on "World Turning"

Additional Personnel:

- Jana Anderson – background vocals
- Sharon Celani – background vocals
- Neale Heywood – guitar, background vocals
- Taku Hirano – percussion
- Steve Rinkov – additional drums
- Carlos Rios – guitar
- Brett Tuggle – keyboards, guitar, background vocals

== Production ==
Photography by Neal Preston and Karen Johnston

Music mixed by Ed Cherney and Mark Needham

Live Recording by David Hewitt on Remote Recording Services Silver Truck

== Chart performance ==
Chart (2004)	Peak position
US Billboard 200	84

== Certifications ==
Region	Certification	Certified units/sales
United Kingdom (BPI)	Gold	25,000^{*}
United States (RIAA)	Platinum	100,000^{^}
^{*} Sales figures based on certification alone.^{^} Shipments figures based on certification alone.
