= Come (Fleetwood Mac song) =

Song by Fleetwood Mac

from the album Say You Will
- Recorded: 1995–2002
- Studio: Ocean Way, Hollywood
- Length: 5:59
- Label: Reprise
- Songwriter: Lindsey Buckingham
- Producers: Lindsey Buckingham; Rob Cavallo

"Come" is a Fleetwood Mac song written and sung by Lindsey Buckingham. It first appeared as the ninth track on the band's 2003 studio album Say You WIll after initially being recorded for one of Buckingham's solo albums. It is the longest track on Say You Will and does not include any contributions from Stevie Nicks, who declined to sing on the song due to the lyrical content. Fleetwood Mac performed the song live on the album's accompanying tour and footage of this song later appeared on the band's Fleetwood Mac: Live in Boston album in 2004.

== Background ==
The song's origins date back to the mid-1990s when Buckingham began work on his Gift of Screws album with Rob Cavallo serving as producer. Mick Fleetwood and John McVie accompanied him in the recording studio and played drums and bass respectively on Buckingham's material, which included "Come". By 1997, Buckingham was asked to rejoin Fleetwood Mac for a live performance that would later become The Dance. As such, the songs from the Gift of Screws sessions were temporarily shelved, including "Come". Rolling Stone mentioned in a 1997 article that "Come" was one of the tracks from Buckingham's solo album that he had set aside in favor of a Fleetwood Mac tour. They said that the track "features a honking guitar workout that should serve as a do-ya-feel-lucky-punk invitation to any doubting arrivistes who haven't replaced their six-strings with samplers." An unmastered version of the song was leaked online in 2001.

Neale Heywood, who served as a touring guitarist for Fleetwood Mac beginning in 1997, co-wrote the song with Buckingham. John McVie played bass guitar on "Come" and remembered that he had a difficult time mastering his part and called the song "one of Lindsey's "brain teasers". When Mick Fleetwood was asked in a 2003 interview about his favorite material on Say You Will, he selected "Come".

Buckingham mentioned in a 2003 interview with Guitar World that Nicks declined his offer to sing on "Come". He speculated that she refused due to her belief that the lyrics were too "dirty". Buckingham said that it "tells you something about someone who has been a rock icon but in some ways is still quite a conservative person. And I don't see her as someone who has lived her life very conservatively. So there's an interesting dichotomy there." Buckingham mentioned that "it was a fight getting that on the album" and that he encountered similar issues with Nicks over the song's inclusion in the band's live set. He also remembered that Nicks objected to the song's inclusion on Say You Will, adding that "she thought people would think it was about her-it isn't."

Certain interviewers asked members of the band whether Buckingham wrote the song about his romantic relationship with Anne Heche during the 1990s. Heche had documented her relationship with Buckingham in her memoir, Call Me Crazy, which according to her lasted roughly a year. Fleetwood declined to comment on the song's lyrics when James Halbert of Classic Rock magazine asked Fleetwood if the song related to Heche. When Buckingham was asked if "Come" was about Heche in an interview with The Ann Arbor News, he responded "since you're asking, I would have to say yes, it is."

== Recording ==
Buckingham said that he approached certain songs like "Come" from a Cubist perspective where he sought to break down certain phrases into smaller components. He then applied different effects to these vocal fragments for the purpose of "accentuating the artificiality of it." Buckingham achieved several of these effects during the recording process, with additional work being conducted by Mark Needham, who served as an audio mixer during the Say You Will sessions.

It's all based on the idea of trying to break vocal lines down into facets, the same way Cubism breaks down a visual line. Each part of each vocal line was sung separately and recorded on a separate track. Then each track was processed a little differently. So one part of the line might have a flangy effect, and the next part a wet reverb. So you're making the whole thing more artificial, in the way Cubism does, but it gives you a whole spatial world. A few of the guitar tracks also have that give-and-take quality that runs across from left to right.

— Lindsey Buckingham

The song begins with what Uncut described as a "softly ambient" musical passage that later transitions into a "blaringly histrionic rocker." The verses consist of a guitar motif with a tremolo and the choruses feature distorted guitars, resonant drums, and organ overdubs played by Jamie Muhoberac.

== Critical reception ==
Writing for the Los Angeles Times, Natalie Nichols called the song a "sardonic blues-rocker" with "a satisfyingly bitter kick." James McNair of The Independent characterised "Come" as a "deliciously barbed" song. Discussing the song in The Arizona Republic, Larry Rodgers said that "Come" was "sexually charged" track that showcased Buckingham's "searing guitar work". Dave Swanson of Ultimate Classic Rock called "Come" a "harsh, heavy rocker that borders on psychotic with its ferocious guitar solo." Writing for Sound & Vision, Mike Mettler wrote that the song's "blistering solo goes on as long as it needs to get to the release valve, and one that became an even more extended live highlight whenever he performed that song during latter-era Mac tours."

== Live performances ==
Fleetwood Mac played "Come" during their 2003-04 Say You Will Tour. The song featured an extended guitar solo from Buckingham, with Curtis Ross of The Tampa Tribune noting that he "flailed away" and "pounded his guitar like a madman." In a concert review for the band's performance at the Point in Dublin, Simon Price of The Independent reported that Buckingham knocked over Nicks' microphone stand as he was "pirouetting recklessly with his guitar." Whereas some of Buckingham's material was replaced with different songs for the final leg of the tour in 2004, "Come" was retained in the setlist. A rendition of "Come" from the band's performance at the Fleet Center in Boston was included on the 2004 live video/audio album Fleetwood Mac: Live in Boston.

Buckingham played the song as a solo artist in 2012, with Bill Brownlee calling the rendition "gritty" and describing the guitar solo as "tormented". That same year, a live acoustic recording of "Come" was included on his One Man Show album.

== Personnel ==
- Lindsey Buckingham – guitars, percussion, vocals
- John McVie – bass guitar
- Mick Fleetwood – drums, percussion
- Jamie Muhoberac – Hammond organ
