= One Man Show (album) =

Live album by Lindsey Buckingham
- Released: November 14, 2012
- Recorded: September 1, 2012
- Genre: Rock
- Label: Buckingham Records

Lindsey Buckingham chronology
Songs from the Small Machine: Live in L.A at Saban Theatre in Beverly Hills, CA / 2011 (2011)	One Man Show (2012)	Lindsey Buckingham Christine McVie (2017)

One Man Show is a live album by Fleetwood Mac guitarist/vocalist Lindsey Buckingham released for download only on November 13, 2012 via iTunes. The live show was recorded from a single night in Des Moines, Iowa whilst Buckingham was on his one-man show tour of North American venues in 2012. Six of the 13 songs originate from albums by Fleetwood Mac, six originate from Buckingham's solo albums, and one originates from the Buckingham Nicks album.

== Background ==
One Man Show was recorded in one take on September 1, 2012 at a performance in Des Moines, Iowa. The entire show features Buckingham on guitar and vocals without a backing band. Buckingham discussed the premise of the live album in a press release.

As an artist, you need to seek out what is essential and discard what is inessential, to always keep an eye on what lives at the center. That was the impetus for this performance. My center has always been voice and guitar, and as I've evolved, I've looked to broaden the range and vocabulary of that center. So when I decided to tour in 2012, it suddenly felt as though I'd been working towards something, that I'd arrived at a new place. I sensed it was time to do something I'd never done: A one man show. This performance is from a single night in Des Moines, Iowa, taken right off the console mix, with a couple of room mikes added in. It's live and raw, with no post-production. I love it! It captures not only the spirit of the performance, but also the spirit of where I now live as an artist.

== Critical reception ==
In his review for the Lexington Herald-Leader, Walter Tunis noted that Buckingham's banter at the Iowa show was nearly identical to how he introduced each song during his performance at the Lexington Opera House. He characterized the album as "an unaccompanied rock parade that just happens to be acoustic" rather than a "folkie reinvention of Buckingham's music" and highlighted the inclusion of "Castaway Dreams" and the three songs from his Under the Skin album.

== Track listing ==
All songs written by Lindsey Buckingham, except "Shut Us Down", which was written by Buckingham and Cory Sipper:

1. "Cast Away Dreams"
2. "Bleed to Love Her"
3. "Not Too Late"
4. "Stephanie"
5. "Come"
6. "Shut Us Down"
7. "Go Insane"
8. "Never Going Back Again"
9. "Big Love"
10. "I'm So Afraid"
11. "Go Your Own Way"
12. "Trouble"
13. "Seeds We Sow"

== Personnel ==
- Lindsey Buckingham – lead vocals, guitars
