= Gift of Screws =

Studio album by Lindsey Buckingham
- Released: September 15, 2008
- Recorded: 1995–2008
- Studios: Ocean Way Recording (Hollywood, California); Cornerstone Studios (Chatsworth, California)
- Genre: Rock
- Length: 38:46
- Label: Reprise
- Producer: Lindsey Buckingham

Lindsey Buckingham chronology
Live at the Bass Performance Hall (2008)	Gift of Screws (2008)	Seeds We Sow (2011)

Singles from Gift of Screws
- 1. "Did You Miss Me" Released: July 2008; 2. "Love Runs Deeper" Released: September 2008; 3. "Gift of Screws EP" Released: October 2009

Gift of Screws is the fifth solo album by American musician and Fleetwood Mac vocalist/guitarist Lindsey Buckingham. It was released on September 15, 2008, less than two years after Buckingham's Under the Skin album. Gift of Screws peaked at number 48 on the Billboard 200 album chart in September 2008. It was Buckingham's last solo album to be released by Warner Records.

== Album history ==
The album title existed as a solo album set for release in 2001 by Reprise Records. Songs were recorded between 1995 and 2000, some of which were performed and recorded live by Fleetwood Mac for their The Dance album and tour in 1997. They also feature contributions from bandmates Mick Fleetwood and John McVie. High-quality bootlegs of the Gift of Screws project, which had been mixed but not yet mastered, were publicly circulated in October 2001.

Upon presenting the finished album to Reprise, Buckingham was advised to retain some of the material for a forthcoming Fleetwood Mac album. To this end, Buckingham contributed several of the songs towards the 2003 album Say You Will and ultimately his next solo project, Under the Skin, released in 2006. Buckingham mentioned in interviews upon the release of Under the Skin that his next album would be more rock-oriented and potentially feature contributions from Fleetwood and McVie. He also expressed interest in working with another producer on the album and giving his record label more creative control over the final product, adding that he would be open to re-record some of his existing material.

"The Right Place to Fade", "Wait for You", and the title track were all part of the original track listing for Gift of Screws. Buckingham remarked that "there were a few stragglers and those three were sort of put on the shelves. And I really didn't expect them to find a home...But once these songs started wanting to rock, I realized that these songs had in fact found a home." He believed that these songs could have been used for Fleetwood Mac with additional involvement from other members of the band and expressed his opinion that "there's never been any one thing that defines something as a Fleetwood Mac song or a solo song". He also thought that Fleetwood would have "loved to have the song 'Gift of Screws' on a Fleetwood Mac album so [he] could've played it on stage."

== Recording and composition ==
Buckingham played a Baby Taylor, a Martin D-18, a Turner Renaissance acoustic, and a Model One electric guitar during the making of Gift of Screws. Most of Buckingham's guitar parts were recorded directly into a 1980s Neotek Elite mixing console rather than amplifiers, which were only used sparingly. He occasionally sent his electric guitars through a Boss OD-1 overdrive effect pedal and also utilized some presets on Roland's VG-8 V-Guitar System.

The album features a song ("Great Day") co-written with Buckingham's son Will and two songs co-written with his wife Kristen, who is also credited with the album's photography. Kristen assisted with the lyrics on both "Did You Miss Me" and "Love Runs Deeper". Buckingham said that "it was a little less tangible what she did, but she came up with a bit of the structure." For the lyrical inspiration to "Great Day", Buckingham overheard his seven-year-old son walking around his house singing the words "Great day, great day". He subsequently built a song around Will's vocal melody with "fingerpicked acoustic parts, counterpoint vocals, and flashy leads." Buckingham pounded on the leather pads of a mixing console to achieve the rhythms found throughout the song, which was featured prominently during the song's intro.

Buckingham wrote "Time Precious Time" after watching Terrence Malick's film The New World, which featured a repeating orchestral motif that inspired him to create a song around a guitar arpeggio with a rolling pick. He experimented with an unconventional guitar tuning to convey a desired mood that reflected the musical score of the film. "Bel Air Rain" was written about decadence of Fleetwood Mac and how that contrasted with the lifestyle Buckingham had when he wrote the song, saying that he "lived in Bel Air for a number of years as a bachelor with some crazy girlfriends" and that he later built a house in that neighborhood for his family. Buckingham said that "Right Place to Fade" was a song that related to moving on from one goal to another, saying that "what I'm trying to say is that we all go through life under one spell for a period of time, but you learn from that and move on to something else."

On the title track, which takes inspiration from an Emily Dickinson poem, Buckingham double tracked his lead vocals and recorded his guitars through Fender Bassman and Vox AC30 guitar amplifiers. He said that "we put a bunch of amps in different rooms, and mixed and matched the sounds until we got what we wanted." Buckingham mentioned that "Treason" was about "selfishness and greed" and felt that it would be a fitting song to represent the presidency of George W. Bush. "Underground" related to the general indifference that Buckingham's record label displayed toward his solo material.

They never really knew what to do with my solo stuff. Fleetwood Mac was the priority...By the time I got to doing Gift of Screws, it felt like their interest in me as a solo artist was on the wane, and that's really what that song is about. The idea was I guess I'll just keep going underground.

== Release ==
Gift of Screws was given a release date of September 16, 2008 by Warner Bros. Records. "Did You Miss Me" had been serviced to Triple A radio stations in August. According to Diarmuid Quinn, who at the time served as the chief operating officer of the label, the album was unexpected from the company, commenting that "the record just showed up. We didn't expect it at all." To promote the album, Buckingham appeared at a Triple A radio convention in Boulder, Colorado in August. He also began a six-week tour starting on September 7 in Saratoga, California. Warner Bros. Records arranged for special promotional bundles that included a copy of Gift of Screws and tickets to Buckingham's shows. The album was released physically on CD as well as a 180g heavyweight black vinyl disc in a Stoughton jacket with bonus CD in paper sleeve via Reprise Records.

An EP was released from Gift of Screws that contained "Did You Miss Me", "Love Runs Deeper" and three live tracks from KBCO Studio C Sessions - "Did You Miss Me", "Time Precious Time" and "Big Love". Two videos that contained track commentaries for "Wait For You" and "Love Runs Deeper" were released as well.

== Critical reception ==
Professional ratings
Aggregate scores
Source	Rating
Metacritic	77/100
Review scores
Source	Rating
AllMusic	4.5/5 stars
BBC News	(Favorable)
musicOMH	4/5 stars
Rolling Stone	3.5/5 stars
USA Today	4/4 stars

According to the review aggregator Metacritic, Gift of Screws received "generally favorable reviews" based on a weighted average score of 77 out of 100 from 15 critic scores. Thom Jurek of AllMusic believed that Gift of Screws was a highlight in his discography. He called the title track "a balls-out rocker that places '60s rave-up garage rock up against '70s glam in a storm of guitars and clattering drums."

Billboard likened "Great Day" to "the stark and primitive sonics of Tusk and Buckingham's early solo albums". Elyssa Gardner wrote in USA Today that the album featured "gorgeously lyrical soundscapes", amounting to Buckingham's finest work since his 1992 solo album Out of the Cradle. Writing for BBC News, Chris Jones said that Gift of Screws was "quite simply, a masterpiece". The album was ranked number 41 in Q's 50 Best Albums of 2008.

== Track listing ==
All tracks written by Lindsey Buckingham except where noted.

No.	Title	Length
1.	"Great Day" (Buckingham, Will Buckingham)	3:15
2.	"Time Precious Time"	4:27
3.	"Did You Miss Me" (Buckingham, Kristen Buckingham)	3:58
4.	"Wait for You"	5:02
5.	"Love Runs Deeper" (Buckingham, Kristen Buckingham)	3:58
6.	"Bel Air Rain"	3:52
7.	"The Right Place to Fade"	4:05
8.	"Gift of Screws"	2:56
9.	"Underground"	3:02
10.	"Treason"	4:28

Gift of Screws EP
No.	Title	Length
1.	"Did You Miss Me"	3:57
2.	"Love Runs Deeper"	3:55
3.	"Did You Miss Me (KBCO Studio C Sessions)"	4:18
4.	"Time Precious Time (KBCO Studio C Sessions)"	4:22
5.	"Big Love (KBCO Studio C Sessions)"	2:54

Bootleg track listing
No.	Title	Official release	Length
1.	"Someone's Gotta Change Your Mind"	Under the Skin
2.	"Miranda"	Say You Will, with additional overdubs
3.	"Steal Your Heart Away"	Say You Will, with additional overdubs
4.	"Red Rover"	Say You Will
5.	"She Smiled Sweetly" (Rolling Stones cover)	Seeds We Sow, alternate version
6.	"Come"	Say You Will
7.	"Down on Rodeo"	Under the Skin
8.	"Gotta Get Away" (Rolling Stones cover)	Officially unreleased
9.	"Try for the Sun" (Donovan cover)	Under the Skin, renamed "To Try for the Sun"
10.	"Shuffle Riff"	Gift of Screws, renamed "Wait for You"
11.	"Murrow"	Say You Will, renamed "Murrow Turning Over in His Grave"
12.	"Gift of Screws"	Gift of Screws
13.	"Bleed to Love Her"	Say You Will
14.	"Twist of Fate"	Gift of Screws, renamed "The Right Place to Fade"
15.	"Go Insane (Live)"	The Very Best of Fleetwood Mac
16.	"Say Goodbye"	Say You Will
17.	"The Singer Not the Song" (Rolling Stones Cover)	Officially unreleased

== Personnel ==
Musicians

- Lindsey Buckingham – vocals, electric guitars, acoustic guitars, keyboards, bass, percussion, programming
- John McVie – bass (4, 8)
- John Pierce – bass (7)
- Walfredo Reyes Jr. – drums (3, 5)
- Mick Fleetwood – drums (4, 7, 8), percussion (4, 7)

Production

- Lindsey Buckingham – producer, engineer, mixing (1, 2, 3, 5–10)
- Rob Cavallo – producer (4, 8)
- Ken Allardyce – engineer
- Mark Needham – engineer, mixing (4)
- Bernie Grundman – mastering at Bernie Grundman Mastering (Hollywood, California)
- Jeri Heiden – art direction, design
- SMOG Design – art direction
- Nick Steinhardt – design
- Kristen Buckingham – photography
- Jeff Gros – additional photography
- Irving Azoff – management
- Tom Consolo – management
- Susan Markheim – management
- Front Line Management – management company

== Charts ==
Chart (2008)	Peak position
Norwegian Albums (VG-lista)	17
Scottish Albums (Official Charts)	91
Swedish Albums (Sverigetopplistan)	35
UK Albums (Official Charts)	59
US Billboard 200	48
US Top Rock Albums (Billboard)	15
US Indie Store Album Sales (Billboard)	13
