= Smile at You =

Song by Fleetwood Mac

from the album Say You Will
- Released: 15 April 2003
- Length: 4:33
- Label: Reprise
- Songwriter: Stevie Nicks
- Producer: Lindsey Buckingham

"Smile at You" is a song by Fleetwood Mac that was written and sung by Stevie Nicks. The song was written in 1976 and was in consideration for several Fleetwood Mac studio albums before it was ultimately reworked and released on their 17th studio album, Say You Will (2003).

== Background ==
In 1976, Nicks had purchased a mansion in Hollywood called El Contento, which was a Spanish-Moorish building constructed in the 1920s. Tom Moncrieff, who had previously worked with Nicks in a musical capacity, moved into her house and constructed a recording studio in her basement. During this time, the two assembled some demos, including one for "Smile at You". Ken Caillat, who produced several Fleetwood Mac albums, recalled that Nicks presented "Smile at You" for inclusion on Rumours and said that the band's guitarist, Lindsey Buckingham, lost interest in the song after learning that she had developed the demo with Moncrieff, who also played the guitar solo on the demo. As such, the band did not make any additional progress on "Smile at You" for the Rumours sessions despite encouragement from Caillat, who later referred to it as a "vicious answer song to Lindsey".

The band recorded a few takes of "Smile at You" for their 1979 album Tusk, but the song did not appear on the final album. "Smile at You" was among the three songs that Nicks intended to include on Fleetwood Mac's next studio album, Mirage. In September 1981, Nicks told BAM magazine that both she and Buckingham wanted to replace "Smile at You" with a different song. She mentioned that "Smile at You" was "kind of a bitter song and that's not where any of us are at right now, even though it's a wonderful song."

Nicks said that "Smile at You" was one of roughly 19 tracks recorded for Mirage and that it was "a real rock and roll song". She explained that several songs needed to be cut to reach the album's final track listing of 12 and that the song selection was made via a band vote. Nicks expressed her opinion that "Lindsey always had a bit of a stronger vote" and that she often acquiesced to his opinions. One mix of "Smile at You, recorded during the band's time at Château d'Hérouville in France, was included on the 2016 deluxe edition of Mirage.

During the Say You Will sessions, "Smile at You" was among the 17 demos that Nicks to Buckingham. Nicks commented in a 2003 interview that the song "could have easily ended up on Rumours". The version recorded for Say You Will was built around guitar-oriented arrangement with prominent bass, harmony vocals, and sparse drums. Whereas previous attempts at "Smile at You" were left incomplete, the band ultimately included "Smile at You" as one of the eighteen tracks on Say You Will. Caillat felt that the version included on Say You Will was "much less powerful" than some of the earlier recordings the band had worked on and believed that the song had "lost its bite".

== Personnel ==
- Mick Fleetwood – drums, percussion
- John McVie – bass guitar
- Lindsey Buckingham – guitars, backing vocals
- Stevie Nicks – lead vocals
