= Bleed to Love Her =

Song by Fleetwood Mac

"Bleed to Love Her (live)"

Song by Fleetwood Mac

from the album The Dance
- Released: 19 August 1997
- Recorded: 23 May 1997
- Venue: Warner Brothers Studios, Burbank, California
- Length: 3:27
- Label: Warner Bros.
- Songwriter: Lindsey Buckingham
- Producers: Fleetwood Mac; Elliot Scheiner

"Bleed to Love Her"

Song by Fleetwood Mac

from the album Say You Will
- Recorded: 1995–2002
- Studio: The Bellagio House; Ocean Way, Hollywood
- Length: 4:06
- Label: Reprise
- Songwriter: Lindsey Buckingham
- Producers: Lindsey Buckingham; Rob Cavallo

"Bleed to Love Her" is a Fleetwood Mac song written and sung by Lindsey Buckingham. It first appeared as the seventh track on the band's 1997 live album The Dance. A studio recording of the song was later included on the band's 2003 album Say You Will. In addition to the song's debut on The Dance Tour, "Bleed to Love Her" has been performed live by Buckingham as a solo artist and on Fleetwood Mac's On with the Show Tour.

== Background ==
=== Composition and recording ===
The song's origins date back to the mid-1990s when Buckingham began work on his Gift of Screws album with Rob Cavallo handling production. Mick Fleetwood and John McVie joined Buckingham in the recording studio to record drums and bass respectively. One of the songs that emerged from those sessions was "Bleed to Love Her".

Buckingham started "Bleed to Love Her" by fretting the song in the key of A; he then tuned his guitar strings down a half step to bring it into the key of G♯. He explained that he did this to overcome his limitations in music theory, saying that "I do whatever it takes. I can only play well in a few keys. I didn't take lessons, and I don't know my scales. I just find things that work and embellish them! I try to work within the limitations that I've got."

The fingerpicked guitar pattern on "Bleed to Love Her" is based around a variation of a forward banjo roll with a syncopated three against four polyrhythm. To play the guitar part, Buckingham used his thumb to play the bass note, his index finger for the G string, and his ring finger for the melody. Some of the backwards guitar tones were achieved with a Stratocaster treated with Lexicon delay and modulated with a volume control pedal.

When crafting the lyrics for "Bleed to Love Her", Buckingham borrowed some lines from the song "You Do or You Don't" from his 1992 solo album Out of the Cradle, specifically the stanza "Someone's go to see this through/All the world is laughing at you/Somebody's gotta sacrifice/If this whole thing's going to turn out right." Buckingham recalled that he encountered difficulties in finding a suitable vocal melody for the verses and that he attempted three or four different ideas before resolving the issue by conducting an internal poll. He said that the finalised verses were "a rip-off of an old Dean Martin song, 'Memories Are Made of This'".

Near the conclusion of the initial recording process, Buckingham was summoned to a meeting at Christine McVie's house and asked to rejoin Fleetwood Mac to film a live performance that would later become The Dance. As such, the songs from the Gift of Screws sessions were temporarily shelved, including "Bleed to Love Her".

=== Inclusion on The Dance and Say You Will ===
In May 1997, the Rumours era lineup of Fleetwood Mac did their first live performance since 1982 on a Warner Bros sound stage. The performance featured two then-unreleased songs from Buckingham, specifically "Bleed to Love Her" and "My Little Demon". Buckingham said that "Bleed to Love Her" was not initially planned for inclusion in the setlist, although the band opted to add "Bleed to Love Her" to the set after running through the song during a rehearsal. In a 1997 interview with Guitar World, Buckingham mentioned that "Bleed to Love Her" was from his "new solo album" and that he was unsure if the live recording would appear on The Dance. The live version of "Bleed to Love Her" was ultimately included on The Dance as one of the album's four previously unreleased songs. During the filming of the live recording, Buckingham prefaced the song with an explanation on how the lineup reunited.

In an October 1997 Q&A, Buckingham expressed hope that the studio version would eventually appear on his solo record. He thought that the studio version of "Bleed to Love Her" was "much better" and "more modern sounding" than the recording that appeared on The Dance. An unmastered version of the song was leaked online in 2001. The studio version of "Bleed to Love Her" was ultimately included on Fleetwood Mac's Say You Will album in 2003. Christine McVie, who was no longer a member of Fleetwood Mac when Say You Will was released, had already sang and played organ on "Bleed to Love Her", and her parts were retained for the final mix.

== Later appearances ==
Following its inclusion on Say You Will, Buckingham has played "Bleed to Love Her" live on a few occasions both as a solo artist and as a member of Fleetwood Mac. At the request of an audience member, Buckingham played an acoustic rendition of "Bleed to Love Her" during an October 2008 performance in Northampton, Massachusetts. In 2012, Buckingham included the song as the second song in his live setlist. That same year, a live acoustic recording of "Bleed to Love Her" was included on his One Man Show album.

Fleetwood Mac included the song in their setlist for the Australian leg of their On with the Show Tour in 2015, which was the first time that the band played the song live since 1997. That same year, Buckingham also played an acoustic rendition of "Bleed to Love Her" during a Q&A session at the USC Marshall School of Business, where he was also joined by the USC Trojan Marching Band for a performance of "Tusk". The following year, Buckingham appeared as himself on episode three of the Roadies television series to perform an acoustic rendition of both "Bleed to Love Her" and "Big Love".

== Personnel ==
- Lindsey Buckingham – guitars, lead vocals
- Stevie Nicks – backing vocals
- John McVie – bass guitar
- Mick Fleetwood – drums, percussion
- Christine McVie – organ, backing vocals
