= Say Goodbye (Fleetwood Mac song) =

2003 song by Fleetwood Mac

Song by Fleetwood Mac

from the album Say You Will
- Released: 15 April 2003
- Recorded: 2001–2002
- Studio: The Village (Los Angeles); Lindsey Buckingham's home studio (Bel Air)
- Genre: Acoustic rock; folk rock
- Length: 3:26
- Label: Warner Bros.
- Songwriter: Lindsey Buckingham
- Producers: Lindsey Buckingham; Rob Cavallo

"Say Goodbye" is a song by the British-American rock band Fleetwood Mac, written by guitarist and vocalist Lindsey Buckingham. It was released as the seventeenth track on the band's seventeenth studio album, Say You Will (2003). Buckingham composed the song around a Travis picking technique on the acoustic guitar several year's prior to its inclusion on Say You Will, after which he performed it for a few Fleetwood Mac tours.

== Background ==
Lindsey Buckingham wrote "Say Goodbye" about his relationship with Stevie Nicks after his departure from Fleetwood Mac in 1987. He commented that "most of our experience together was behind us" by the time he wrote "Say Goodbye", which he described as "a very sweet song". Buckingham wrote the lyrics to "Say Goodbye" before the instrumentation, which he said was an atypical compositional approach for him. Commenting on the specifics of the lyrics, he said that the song was about his perceived lack of closure with Nicks.

This song was written quite a long time ago, after I had left the band. I don't know if I was going for anything in particular, but I was in a place where I could feel compassionate, understanding, and nonjudgmental about the other people in the band, and about everything that had happened. The lyric was really important to me, and the fingerpicking part makes it a really nice guitar piece.

The song's composition is built around a Travis picking guitar part. Buckingham cited "Say Goodbye" as an extension of the approach he employed on acoustic renditions of "Big Love", where he centered the arrangement around a single guitar. "Say Goodbye" lacks any drums or bass, with the guitar taking on a percussive role to supplant the rhythm section. Buckingham commented that the guitar part was "not an easy thing to work out." After attempting different arrangements that he was unsatisfied with, Buckingham detuned the G string on one of his guitars down a step, which rendered it easier for him to handle the guitar parts he envisioned.

Prior to its inclusion on Say You Will, an unmastered version of the song was leaked online in 2001. During the Say You Will recording sessions, which were documented in the Destiny Rules documentary, Buckingham and Nicks worked closely to refine the vocal harmonies.

== Live performances ==
"Say Goodbye" was included on the Fleetwood Mac's 2003–2004 Say You Will Tour. It was also one of the songs performed on Sound Stage Presents – Lindsey Buckingham, which aired in 2005 on PBS. For this rendition, Buckingham performed the song as a duet with Nicks. On the band's 2013 tour, "Say Goodbye" was also the only song that Fleetwood Mac played from their Say You Will album. Buckingham performed the song as a duet with Nicks as the final song of the setlist.

== Personnel ==
- Lindsey Buckingham – lead vocals, acoustic guitars, percussion
- Stevie Nicks – backing vocals
