= Murrow Turning Over in His Grave =

Song by Fleetwood Mac

from the album Say You Will
- Released: 15 April 2003
- Length: 4:12
- Label: Reprise
- Songwriter: Lindsey Buckingham
- Producer: Lindsey Buckingham

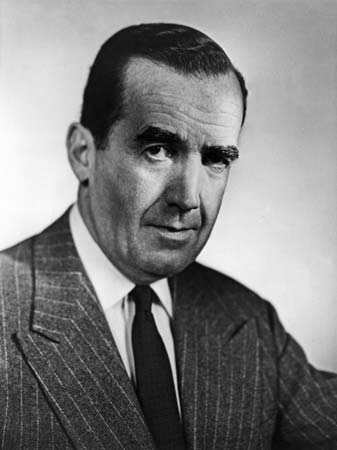
Edward R. Murrow

"Murrow Turning Over in His Grave" is the second track on Fleetwood Mac's 2003 album Say You Will. It was written and sung by Lindsey Buckingham. The lyrics to the song are politically charged, with Sal Cinquemani of Slant Magazine labeling the song as "an anti-media tirade". The song references Edward R. Murrow, a mid-20th century American newsman known for his honesty and integrity.

== Background ==
"Murrow Turning Over in His Grave" originated as a Buckingham solo song that was slated to appear on his Gift of Screws album, but Buckingham ultimately gave the song to Fleetwood Mac for Say You Will. The original Gift of Screws album was intended to be a follow-up to his 1992 album Out of the Cradle, and Buckingham had worked on several new songs, including "Murrow Turning Over In His Grave", in Hollywood during the mid 1990s with producer Rob Cavallo.

Buckingham wrote "Murrow Turning Over in His Grave" during the murder trial of O. J. Simpson as a response to the prominence and prevalence of news outlets such as Court TV, which Buckingham criticized for "stooping to a new low" and being opportunistic in its news reporting. An unmastered version of the song was leaked online in 2001 under the working title "Murrow".

While "Murrow Turning Over In His Grave" did not appear on any of the setlists for the Say You Will Tour, Buckingham performed the song in 2005 as part of a Soundstage TV special.

== Meaning ==
Lindsey Buckingham wrote the song to reflect his belief that Edward R. Murrow, a CBS News journalist in the 1940s, 1950s and 1960s, would be greatly dismayed by the present-day media. He cited one of Murrow's speeches about the dangers of television being used to "delude" and "distract" people and the necessity of programmers using television in a responsible manner as inspiration for the lyrical content.

Buckingham mentioned in an interview with Performing Songwriter that "Murrow Turning Over in His Grave" is about the concentration of media ownership. "We're seeing that coming true on so many levels. Especially in the world today, where all the media is basically owned and controlled and edited to a certain point of view, in the name of objective news, by all the same people who are tied in with another company. A good example would be GE owning NBC. Murrow would be turning over in his grave if he were to see all of this." He also told Guitar World that the ownership of NBC by GE advanced certain narratives at the expense of objectivity.

Murrow gave that famous parting speech when he left CBS, warning what would happen if we didn't take responsibility for TV and use it in the right way. Obviously, we haven't. So "Murrow" is just a song about how the media gets abused and how it is used for propaganda.

== Structure and production ==
The song features Buckingham singing the two verses in a falsetto with the chorus being composed of many overdubbed vocals. Considerable studio production manipulation is used to give the song a synthetic and technological mood. It was described by Billboard as a "bass-heavy" stomper, and by writer Ken Richardson as "fascinating dark stuff". Buckingham's guitar style on the song was described by Greg Kot of the Chicago Tribune as a "psychedelic sun shower".

The song's closing section features a distorted guitar solo of over 90 seconds. To create a distorted effect on his vocals, Buckingham recorded a cluster of five-seven tracks that were out of tune with each other. He said of its recording: "This song has elements of something quite traditional and recognizable in an almost generic sort of way, yet it departs from that at the chorus when you're suddenly into this weird Brian Wilson/Yardbirds acid thing. I would never want to do something that was generic all the way through." The vocals of the chorus partially recreate the traditional song "Black Betty", with Buckingham singing "Ed Murrow had a child, the damn thing went wild" in a shared mix with the song's title, which is sung simultaneously.

== Personnel ==
- Lindsey Buckingham – guitars, keyboards, vocals
- Mick Fleetwood – drums, percussion
- John McVie – bass guitar
- Christine McVie – keyboards
