= Illume (9–11) =

Song by Fleetwood Mac

from the album Say You Will
- Released: 15 April 2003
- Recorded: 2001–2002
- Studio: The Bellagio House, Los Angeles
- Length: 4:51
- Label: Reprise
- Songwriter: Stevie Nicks
- Producers: Lindsey Buckingham; Rob Cavallo

"Illume (9–11)" is a Fleetwood Mac song written and sung by Stevie Nicks that appeared as the third track on the band's 2003 studio album Say You Will. The song originated as a poem that Nicks wrote in response to the September 11 attacks in New York City. She later crafted a demo of the song and presented it to Fleetwood Mac for inclusion on Say You Will.

== Background ==
Nicks wrote the lyrics to "Illume (9–11)" on 11 September 2001 while at the Waldorf Astoria in New York City during a tour stop for her 2001 tour promoting her Trouble in Shangri-La album. She had completed a performance in Toronto the day prior and checked into the hotel at around 1:30 a.m. the morning of 11 September.

Nicks was scheduled to perform two shows in New York, which were cancelled after the September 11 attacks. One of those shows was booked for Rochester, New York, which Nicks said "was cancelled because of an act of war", adding that she at one point "had a military escort on our wing. That whole period nearly drove me into a mental home." She continued her Trouble in Shangri La tour at the insistence of Don Henley, starting with her 15 September performance in Atlantic City.

== Composition ==
=== Original poem ===
When Nicks returned back to her home in Los Angeles, she wrote the lyrics to "Illume (9–11)", starting with the opening stanza "Illume/says the candle that I burn/a reflection in the window". She said that the word "Illume" referred to a type of candle. These lyrics began as prose in her journal and were transformed into a poem. She said that the lyrics to "Illume" were about her observations of the September 11 attacks, where she recalled placing wet towels on her windows to block out the smell of burning iron from the twin towers and watching people jump from those buildings on her television.

Nicks told USA Today that "all my songs suddenly seemed to be about 9/11" around this time. According to Nicks, she had "never been a political person" and said that she "didn't set out to write a September 11 song. It just happened." Nicks had written at least two different songs about 9/11, including "Get Back on the Plane" and "The Towers Touched the Sky", which she deemed "depressing".

The line "I'm alone now/with my thoughts/how we couldn't make it/how we couldn't get out" originated from Nicks' journal entry documenting her thoughts of the 9/11 attacks. When she was writing the lyrics for "Illume (9–11)", Nicks was situated at a desk in her Phoenix home which had a view of Point Dume from her window, which she referenced in the song. "The smell of Nag Champa" lyric related to the incense candle that Nicks lit in her hotel room during 9/11. Nicks decided on the title of "Illume" based on the candle brand that Nicks had in her room.

=== Creation of the song ===
Following the conclusion of her tour promoting the Trouble in Shangri-La album, Nicks requested one month in the beginning of 2002 to write additional songs for Say You Will, which the remaining members of Fleetwood Mac were recording in Bel Air while Nicks was touring. She revisited her "Illume (9–11)" poem and decided to accompany the words with music. By the end of January 2002, Nicks had completed four songs, which she had demoed on a cassette at her home in Phoenix. Of the four songs that Nicks crafted in Phoenix, "Illume (9–11)" was the third song that she completed.

Mick Fleetwood said that he read the poem for "Illume (9–11)" before it was straddled with musical accompaniment. Nicks later asked Fleetwood for feedback, who told her that it was a "modern-day 'Gold Dust Woman'" that had an "Edith Piaf element coming through". When asked to select his favorite songs from Say You Will, "Illume (9–11)" was one of the songs that Fleetwood identified. Nicks told Launch Online her intentions for writing "Illume (9–11)" in a 2003 interview.

I never expected it to be a song that would be anything more than for the people that were in New York City that day. Because I can't write about how everybody else felt--I can only write about how I felt and how I feel New Yorkers felt that day, that morning. So I'm very, very proud of that song. I wanted to say something for those people. That would be forever.

Nicks told Bill DeMain in a 2003 interview that her song "Edge of Seventeen" was the only song in her discography that was analogous to "Illume (9–11)" due to the "seriousness of what [they were] written about." She also labeled it as one of her only songs with political lyrics along with "Desert Angel" and "Show Them The Way". Nicks explained in a 2020 interview that she never performed "Illume (9–11)" live "because it's too close. I don’t know if I could do it."

== Critical reception ==
Tom Moon of The Philadelphia Inquirer called "Illume (9–11)" a "haunting sound painting" and felt that it was one of the songs on Say You Will that "works [its] magic more subversively, over time." In their review of Say You Will, Julian Cole wrote for The Yorkshire Evening Press that "Illume (9–11)" had "subtle power" and "a few naff lyrics". Barney Hoskyns of Uncut characterised the song as a "bongo-driven meditation on life-post-9/11."

Writing for Entertainment Weekly, Alan Light felt that it was "hard to decipher exactly what 'Illume (9-11)' has to do with the World Trade Center attacks, but the feeling of loss and drift is undeniable." In his book, Mirror in the Sky: The Life and Music of Stevie Nicks, Simon Morrison thought that the song was "unnerving", with its "jangling guitar" with strumming that "enhance[s] the sense of anxiousness". He also believed that Fleetwood's drumming was "both meditative and urgent" and placed specific attention on the hi-hat playing that "skims along the top of the register"".

== Personnel ==
- Stevie Nicks – lead vocals
- Lindsey Buckingham – guitars, keyboards, backing vocals
- John McVie – bass guitar
- Mick Fleetwood – drums, percussion
