= Did You Miss Me =

2008 song by Lindsey Buckingham

Single by Lindsey Buckingham

from the album Gift of Screws
- Released: September 2008
- Studio: Cornerstone Studios (Chatsworth, California)
- Length: 3:57
- Label: Reprise
- Songwriters: Lindsey Buckingham; Kristen Buckingham
- Producer: Lindsey Buckingham

Lindsey Buckingham singles chronology
"Show You How" (2006)	"Did You Miss Me" (2008)	"Seeds We Sow" (2011)

"Did You Miss Me" is a song by Lindsey Buckingham that was released on his fifth solo album Gift of Screws in 2008. He co-wrote the song with his wife Kristen, who was responsible for some of the lyrics. The song was released as the lead single from Gift of Screws and issued to adult album alternative radio stations. Buckingham also played the song on the album's accompanying tour, which was launched the same year.

== Background ==
Buckingham was demoed on a Korg 16-track digital tape machine before being transferred to a Sony PCM3348. When discussing his wife's role on "Did You Miss Me", Buckingham credited her with some of the lyrics and the arrangement, saying that her involvement was a "very nice accident."

For the week dated August 8, 2008, "Did You Miss Me" received 40 new plays on adult album alternative (AAA) radio stations reporting to Radio & Records, which was the third highest increase in plays in the AAA format that week. One month later, the song had received 74 plays in that format, placing it outside that listing's Top 30 Triple A songs. Diarmuid Quinn, who at the time served as the chief operating officer for Warner Bros. Records, said that "we hope 'Did You Miss Me' sticks, and if the song takes hold, who knows what he's going to want to do or have time to do."

Following the inclusion of "Did You Miss Me" on Gift of Screws, Buckingham performed the song during live shows promoting the album. During his performance in Portland, Oregon at the Newmark Theatre, Buckingham told the audience that his record company was "loosely" calling "Did You Miss Me" a single, adding, "I say that because I don't know what that means anymore. They didn't make a video." In their review of Buckingham's performance at the Berklee Performance Center, Sarah Rodman said that the song's live rendition "offered a simpler adult contemporary crunch and lilting rhythms".

== Critical reception ==
Jim Kiest of MySA reviewed the single in August, describing it as "simple, direct and kind of rough around the edges." He also likened it to "a sketch from memory of an almost forgotten Fleetwood Mac hit." Thom Jurek of AllMusic believed that the song "could have appeared on any of Fleetwood Mac's blissed-out, bittersweet '70s recordings", adding that "the weave of guitars, layered backing vocals, and drop-dead catchy chorus is pure Buckingham." Writing for MusicOMH, Nic Oliver called the song "a whip-smart pop single good enough to already have landed on the US charts" and said that it "boasts one of the album's most direct lyrical pleas for connection and understanding."

Alfred Soto of The Village Voice thought that the song came "closest to unearthing the romantic wanderlust that's been Buckingham's trademark since 1975's "Monday Morning". In his review for The Guardian, Dave Simpson called "Did You Miss Me" Buckingham's best pop song since "Go Your Own Way". The Boston Globe characterized "Did You Miss Me" as an "engaging song" where Buckingham "doesn't stray far from his comfort zone". Writing for the San Francisco Chronicle, Tom Lanham said that the song "feels like vintage Mac telegraphed through a tinny old Victorola."

== Personnel ==
- Lindsey Buckingham – guitars, bass, vocals
- Walfredo Reyes Jr. – drums
