= I'm So Afraid =

1975 song by Fleetwood Mac

Song by Fleetwood Mac

from the album Fleetwood Mac
- A-side: "Over My Head"
- Released: September 1975 (US) / February 1976 (UK)
- Recorded: February 1975
- Genre: Hard rock
- Length: 4:22; 3:08 (Single remix)
- Label: Reprise
- Songwriter: Lindsey Buckingham
- Producers: Fleetwood Mac, Keith Olsen

"I'm So Afraid (Live)"

Song by Fleetwood Mac

from the album The Dance
- Released: 19 August 1997 (The Dance); 12 October 2002 (US version of The Very Best of Fleetwood Mac); 2009 (UK version of said compilation)
- Recorded: 23 May 1997
- Genre: Hard rock
- Length: 7:45; 6:01 (Compilation edit)
- Label: Warner Bros.
- Songwriter: Lindsey Buckingham
- Producers: Lindsey Buckingham; Elliot Scheiner

"I'm So Afraid" is a song written by Lindsey Buckingham for the British-American band Fleetwood Mac for their tenth album, Fleetwood Mac. The song was intended for a second Buckingham Nicks album, but the album never came to fruition. It was also issued as the B-side to "Over My Head", which became the band's first top 20 hit in the United States. Buckingham has performed "I'm So Afraid" on numerous tours, both with Fleetwood Mac and as a solo artist.

== Background ==
Like all other Buckingham and Stevie Nicks compositions on Fleetwood Mac's 1975 eponymous album, "I'm So Afraid" was written before Buckingham joined Fleetwood Mac. He wrote the song around the time he was suffering from a bout of mononucleosis. Buckingham remembered that he recorded a demo of the song after the release of Buckingham Nicks and that this version largely resembled the recording that appeared on Fleetwood Mac, albeit without an "effective rhythm section" according to Buckingham. Once he presented the song to the rest of Fleetwood Mac, he then opened up the arrangement for John McVie and Mick Fleetwood to create their own bass and drum parts to accompany the song.

In his 2014 autobiography, Fleetwood recalled that Buckingham had labored over the song for four years and had "gotten the harmony of the guitar parts so in tune they were a virtual orchestra unto themselves." Buckingham incorporated musical themes from church music on "I'm So Afraid" and built the song's chord progression around a series of triads and drew inspiration from church music. He said that the song "addressed the yin-yang of having confidence and having faith that you have something to offer in a somewhat tenuous environment that is the entertainment industry. And yet, there's always a fear underneath that."

"I'm So Afraid" is the final track of the album, and was released as the B-side to the song "Over My Head". It is a hard rock song, atypical of Fleetwood Mac's songs (at least following the Peter Green era), but it quickly became a live staple showcasing Buckingham's guitar skills. The studio version of the song is in G natural minor, but live versions are usually transposed down to F natural minor. David Devore, who served as the second engineer for the band's 1975 self-titled album, recalled that Mick Fleetwood used a six-foot gong on "I'm So Afraid".

Mick needed to hit this gong and bury it in the track. I remember I had it miked on the other side. He hit the gong and screamed into it, just for the hell of it. It was almost a joke, but it ended up making the most amazing sound I've ever heard out of a gong because it started resonating his voice...It was really eerie sounding: this giant gong resonating, turning into a scream. It made the hair on my neck stand up.

— David Devore

== Live performances ==
In his book Making Rumours, producer Ken Caillat noted differences between the studio and live versions of "I'm So Afraid". Compared to the album version, which Caillat described as "mellower with a folk rock vibe", live performances saw "I'm So Afraid" become a "faster, hard-edged song." Buckingham said that performing the song live is "very taxing on a nightly basis because it's got this very long solo that I have to do every night."

The song appeared on all of the band's live albums recorded after its release, starting with Live in 1980. The Washington Post called this live rendition of "I'm So Afraid" a "major weak spot" on the album that "features the band posing as heavy-metal rompers while Buckingham does his best to croon like Cher." It later appeared on The Dance, Fleetwood Mac: Live in Boston, the 2015 box set of Tusk, and Rumours Live. The live recording from The Dance was included in an edited form on the US 2002 and UK 2009 release of the greatest hits compilation album The Very Best of Fleetwood Mac.

Buckingham has also performed the song live as a solo artist beginning with the Out of the Cradle Tour in 1992–1993. A live recording taken from Buckingham's January 2007 performance at the Bass Performance Hall in Fort Worth, Texas appeared on Buckingham's Live at the Bass Performance Hall live album/DVD in 2008. He performed the song in 2008 when promoting his Gift of Screws album. In their review of the performance, Jason Cohen of Billboard called "I'm So Afraid" the best song of the set, characterizing it as "an ominous, exquisitely slow-paced workout that built into a mind-bending and rapturous extended solo." He added that the song "left Buckingham literally gasping for breath and the crowd ecstatic on its feet." Buckingham also included the song on his solo live albums Songs from the Small Machine: Live in L.A. and One Man Show.

== Critical reception ==
"I'm So Afraid" has generally received positive reviews from music critics. In his review of the band's 1975 self-titled album, Bud Scopa of Rolling Stone thought that the song stood out upon repeated listens. In 2022, the same publication ranked the "I'm So Afraid" 34th on its list of the top 50 greatest Fleetwood Mac songs, labeling it a "paranoid blues blowout". The Rolling Stone Album Guide called the song a "soulful closer". Simon Reynolds of Spin was complimentary of Buckingham's vocal delivery on the song and compared its bassline to the work of Joy Division.

== Track listing ==
- US vinyl, 7", Single (Reprise Records - RPS 1339)
1. "Over My Head" – 3:17
2. "I'm So Afraid" – 4:15

== Personnel ==
- Lindsey Buckingham – lead vocals, electric guitars, acoustic guitar
- Christine McVie – keyboards
- Stevie Nicks – backing vocals
- John McVie – bass guitar
- Mick Fleetwood – drums, gong
