= Solo show =

Solo show may refer to:

- Solo performance, a single person telling a story to entertain an audience
- Solo exhibition, a display of the work of only one artist
