= Say You Will (Fleetwood Mac song) =

2003 single by Fleetwood Mac

Single by Fleetwood Mac

from the album Say You Will
- Released: 16 June 2003
- Length: 3:50
- Label: Reprise
- Songwriter: Stevie Nicks
- Producers: Lindsey Buckingham, Rob Cavallo, John Shanks

Fleetwood Mac singles chronology
"Peacekeeper" (2003)	"Say You Will" (2003)	"Sad Angel" (2013)

"Say You Will" is a song from British-American band Fleetwood Mac's 17th studio album, Say You Will (2003). The song reached number seven on the US Billboard Adult Alternative Songs chart and was performed live on Fleetwood Mac's Say You Will Tour. The song features vocals from American singer-songwriter Sheryl Crow, bass guitarist John McVie's daughter Molly McVie, singer Stevie Nicks' niece Jessica Nicks and Jessica's best friend Maddy Felsch.

== Background ==
Nicks wrote "Say You Will" after the conclusion of a solo tour. She had previously submitted 17 songs to Lindsey Buckingham prior to the start of the tour for the rest of the band to work on in her absence. Upon her return, Nicks decided that she wanted to write some newer material to augment the older songs that she had pre-approved. In December 2001, she went to her house in Phoenix, Arizona and wrote four new songs, including the title track. She wrote the lyrics to the chorus first and later developed the verses on her piano. Nicks recalled that she struggled to create the melody for the chorus and resolved the issue by improvising one in her living room, which she captured on tape and later presented to the rest of the band in Los Angeles. Nicks said the following during an interview with Performing Songwriter magazine in 2003:

That song is not just about Lindsey. It's about a movie I saw about Arturo Sandoval, the trumpet player...that was really my inspiration for that song. The chorus was written first, then I went back to write the verses... you have this great chorus that basically says, 'If you dance with me, you won't be mad at me anymore. We can be in a huge argument, but if we put on some music and start to dance, everything will be great.' Then I had to think about what to make the verses about. So I went back over all my relationships with people and think of different ways that I have felt when I wanted basically to burst into song and sing that chorus (laughs). Give me one more chance. That's what came out of it. It's funny because, we just did an interview the day before yesterday, and I don't think any of the band knows that that was the reason I wrote the song.

The title track was one of the two compositions on Say You Will along with "Silver Girl" that featured contributions from Sheryl Crow. According to Nicks, Crow came in near the end of the recording sessions to play piano on the title track. The song also features additional backing vocals from John McVie's daughter Molly, Nicks' niece Jessica, and Jessica's friend Maddy Felsch.

The radio edit for "Say You Will" was mixed at Cornerstone Studios in Chatsworth, Los Angeles by Buckingham and Mark Needham. Prior to its release as a single, the song was used as a television promo for That '70s Show. In the United Kingdom, "Say You Will" received 150 plays during the week dated 24 May 2003 based on information collected by Music Control UK, placing the song at No. 40 on the Official UK Airplay Chart.

== Track listing ==
Reprise Records – PRO-CDR-101137

1. "Say You Will" (Single Remix Fade) – 3:49
2. "Say You Will" (Single Remix Cold) – 3:36
- Producer – Lindsey Buckingham
- Remix – Chris Lord-Alge

== Personnel ==
- Stevie Nicks – lead vocals
- Lindsey Buckingham – guitars, backing vocals
- John McVie – bass guitar
- Mick Fleetwood – drums, percussion

Additional personnel

- Sheryl Crow – piano
- Molly McVie – backing vocals
- Jessica Nicks – backing vocals
- Maddy Felsch – backing vocals

== Charts ==
=== Weekly charts ===
Chart (2003)	Peak position
US Adult Alternative Airplay (Billboard)	7
US Adult Contemporary (Billboard)	17
US Adult Pop Airplay (Billboard)	21

=== Year-end charts ===
Chart (2003)	Position
US Adult Contemporary (Billboard)	40
US Adult Top 40 (Billboard)	85
US Triple-A (Billboard)	44

== Release history ==
Region	Date	Format(s)	Label(s)	Ref.
United States	16 June 2003	Triple A radio	Reprise	
United States	23 June 2003	Adult contemporary; hot adult contemporary radio	Reprise	
