= Peacekeeper (song) =

2003 single by Fleetwood Mac

Single by Fleetwood Mac

from the album Say You Will
- Written: 2000
- Released: 10 March 2003
- Length: 4:11 (album version); 4:08 (alternate version)
- Label: Reprise
- Songwriter: Lindsey Buckingham
- Producers: Lindsey Buckingham; John Shanks

Fleetwood Mac singles chronology
"Landslide" (live) (1998)	"Peacekeeper" (2003)	"Say You Will" (2003)

"Peacekeeper" is a song by Fleetwood Mac, written by guitarist and vocalist Lindsey Buckingham, from their 17th studio album, Say You Will (2003). It was the first and most commercially successful single released from the album. Buckingham shared vocals with bandmate Stevie Nicks. "Peacekeeper" peaked at No. 80 on the US Billboard Hot 100 and was the band's most recent song to debut on that chart until 2026, when the studio version of "Landslide" entered the listing at No. 41.

== Background ==
Buckingham wrote "Peacekeeper" around two and a half years before the release of Say You Will. An early mix of "Peacekeeper" was included on limited edition CD distributed at the ACLU Bill of Rights Dinner on 9 December 2000.

During the recording process, Buckingham ran some of his vocals through an amplifier with distortion and applied EQ to accentuate the mid-range frequencies and eliminate the low end. Buckingham and Mark Needham mixed the song on a 128-track Pro Tools HD system, which was the only song on Say You Will along with "What's the World Coming To?" that required this device. Needham took sections from Buckingham's "Peacekeeper" demo and combined it with a new version that the band recorded.

When asked about the lyrics for "Peacekeeper" by Bill DeMain of Performing Songwriter, Buckingham explained that he approached the song by analyzing different perspectives of peace, saying that he was "looking at the kind of thinking that is matter-of-fact and desensitized towards certain actions that go on in the world and the kind of blankness and conformity that goes along with that." He further questioned the notion of peace existing as a "static condition" and said that the song rebukes those who fail to value the ideal of peace.

In an interview with the Miami Herald, Buckingham characterised "Peacekeeper" as a peace song that explored the interplay between institutions and individuals, including those who are unaffected and unmoved by global crises. "It's about how we are becoming increasingly desensitized to things around the world that are brutal and not standing up for human value." He told USA Today that the song "may carry reference points that apply to events of the last couple years." He told The Philadelphia Inquirer that the song "could be applied to a nation and also a relationship" and said that it was one of the songs on Say You Will that related to the idea of Greek gods "looking down on the human race, wondering when to pull the plug."

== Release ==
In February 2003, a snippet of the song was previewed on NBC's Third Watch. That same month, the song beat out entries by John Mellencamp, the Beastie Boys, and George Michael for Drudge Report's radio poll of the Top New Anti-War Songs. "Peacekeeper" was serviced to US AC, Hot AC and Triple A radio stations in early March. During the month of March, "Peacekeeper" was the most added song on AC and Hot AC formats for two weeks in a row. The following month, Music & Media reported that "Peacekeeper" would be a radio-only track in Europe.

Some radio stations in Los Angeles played "Peacekeeper" prior to and after news updates on the Iraq War. Buckingham noted that the song was written several years before the Iraq War, but acknowledged the song's salience and recognised that "anything that aspires to be artistic has to have an element of ambiguity to it. There can't be only one interpretation."

Through AOL's First Listen service, which provided subscribers exclusive access to music 48 hours before its official release, the company reported that "Peacekeeper" had been streamed 886,000 times in one day and 1.1 million times in two days. "Peacekeeper" entered the US Billboard Hot 100 at number 93 on 29 March 2003, making it the band's 25th entry on that chart. It registered 1,500 paid downloads on its first week, which vaulted the song to number 11 on the Singles Sales Chart. That same week, it also garnered 10.8 million listener impressions. According to Howard Cohen of the Miami Herald, "Peacekeeper" became the first song to enter the Billboard Hot 100 from sales solely derived from internet downloads.

The following week, "Peacekeeper" registered 150 paid downloads, which was insufficient for a second week on the Singles Sales Chart. Six weeks later, the song reached its peak position of number 80 on the Billboard Hot 100. By the time "Peacekeeper" exited the chart, it had tallied 11 consecutive weeks in the top 100. In New Zealand, the single proved to be more successful, reaching number 31 on the RIANZ Singles Chart.

== Critical reception ==
People magazine described "Peacekeeper" as a "country-tinged antiwar track" that was "eerily prescient". The Los Angeles Times compared the "wheezily rollicking single" to "Dreams" and "Go Your Own Way". Rolling Stone wrote that a song like "Peacekeeper" demonstrated that the band's "singular vibe – a sunny, countrified lope against which urgent breakup lyrics blaze - has always been [Buckingham's] doing".

Chuck Taylor of Billboard labelled the song as "vintage-quality Mac, familiar in its style and structure, and yet fresh and spirited enough to maintain appeal after countless spins." He also predicted that the song would perform well on all radio formats, particularly adult contemporary radio stations. Writing for Radio & Records, Mike Trias said that the song is "filled with harmonies that give the midtempo song an almost happy tone, despite its lyrics."

== Other appearances ==
"Peacekeeper" appeared on both setlists for Fleetwood Mac's 2003–2004 Say You Will Tour. During these performances, Buckingham would preface the song with the statement "When love is gone, there is always justice. And when justice is gone, there is force." The song was also included on the DVD version of Live in Boston, which was recorded over the course of two nights in September 2003. A different live recording of "Peacekeeper" was included on the limited deluxe edition of Say You Will, which included a total of four bonus tracks. "Peacekeeper" would later make it onto all editions of 50 Years – Don't Stop in 2018. "Peacekeeper" was one of the songs performed on Sound Stage Presents – Lindsey Buckingham with Special Guest Stevie Nicks, which aired in 2005 on PBS.

== Track listing ==
Reprise CD single PR03903 (Warner)

1. "Peacekeeper" (single remix) – 4:11
2. "Peacekeeper" (single edit) – 3:42

== Personnel ==
- Lindsey Buckingham – guitars, keyboards, percussion, vocals
- Stevie Nicks – vocals
- Mick Fleetwood – drums, percussion
- John McVie – bass guitar
- John Shanks – guitar

== Charts ==
=== Weekly charts ===
Chart (2003)	Peak position
Netherlands (Single Top 100)	100
New Zealand (Recorded Music NZ)	31
US Billboard Hot 100	80
US Adult Alternative Airplay (Billboard)	1
US Adult Contemporary (Billboard)	10
US Adult Pop Airplay (Billboard)	16
US Heritage Rock (Billboard)	20
US AC (Radio & Records)	9
US Hot AC (Radio & Records)	16
US Triple A (Radio & Records)	4

=== Year-end charts ===
Chart (2003)	Position
US Adult Contemporary (Billboard)	29
US Adult Top 40 (Billboard)	51
US Triple-A (Billboard)	22
US AC (Radio & Records)	35
US Hot AC (Radio & Records)	55
US Triple A (Radio & Records)	30

== See also ==
- List of anti-war songs
