= Say You Will (album) =

Studio album by Fleetwood Mac
- Released: 15 April 2003
- Recorded: 1995–1997, summer 2001 – fall 2002
- Studios: The Bellagio House; Cornerstone, Chatsworth; Ocean Way, Hollywood; Lindsey Buckingham's home
- Genre: Pop rock
- Length: 75:56
- Label: Reprise
- Producers: Lindsey Buckingham; Rob Cavallo; John Shanks

Fleetwood Mac chronology
The Very Best of Fleetwood Mac (2002)	Say You Will (2003)	Fleetwood Mac: Live in Boston (2004)

Singles from Say You Will
- 1. "Peacekeeper" Released: 10 March 2003; 2. "Say You Will" Released: 16 June 2003

Say You Will is the seventeenth and final studio album by British-American rock band Fleetwood Mac, released on 15 April 2003. It followed 1995's Time and was their first album since 1970 without vocalist/keyboardist Christine McVie as a full member following her departure in 1998, although she participated in some songs as a guest musician; it would be her last time being involved with the band in a studio capacity before her death in 2022. Lindsey Buckingham and Stevie Nicks shared keyboard duties throughout the album.

This was the band's last full album with Buckingham before his dismissal from the group in 2018, although he participated in their 2013 extended play and the 2017 Lindsey Buckingham Christine McVie album which included Mick Fleetwood and John McVie.

Say You Will was the first studio Fleetwood Mac album to peak in the top three in the US since 1982's Mirage. The album debuted at No. 3 with sales of 218,000, spent two months within the top 40, and was certified Gold by the RIAA in July 2003 for 500,000 copies shipped in the US. In the UK, the album peaked at No. 6 and was certified Gold by the BPI in May 2003 for 100,000 copies shipped.

A limited-edition version of the album was issued at the same time, featuring two live tracks ("Peacekeeper" and "Say You Will"), two additional studio tracks (Nicks' "Not Make Believe" and Buckingham's cover of Bob Dylan's "Love Minus Zero/No Limit"), an expanded booklet and poster.

== Background ==
Soon after the release of Time in 1995, Fleetwood Mac decided to disband. Around that time, Lindsey Buckingham was working on a solo album and had invited Mick Fleetwood to play drums on some tracks. As the sessions progressed, John McVie and Christine McVie later became involved with the project. In 1996, Buckingham collaborated with Stevie Nicks on the song "Twisted", which featured drumming from Fleetwood. By 1997, the Rumours lineup agreed to perform again for an MTV Unplugged special. Following the successful reunion album, The Dance, which included a live performance of "Bleed to Love Her", Christine McVie left the group, citing her fear of flying as the primary reason.

In the early 2000s, Buckingham was finishing up a solo album but was encouraged by the band to set the material aside for a Fleetwood Mac record. With the exception of "What's the World Coming To?" and "Peacekeeper", all of Buckingham's Say You Will songs were considered for his aborted solo record. Some of Buckingham's songs on Say You Will were initially developed in the mid-1990s with Fleetwood and Rob Cavallo in Hollywood. Buckingham stated that the music he created during these solo sessions "tapped into some new areas" and were "the best that I've ever done on my own, or with Fleetwood Mac". Some of this material, which according to Buckingham was otherwise finished prior to the Say You Will sessions, later received some bass overdubs from John McVie and vocals from Nicks.

With their surplus of material, the band considered making Say You Will a double album, but opted to condense it into a single disc of 18 songs. 23 songs were ultimately recorded, of which five were cut from the album. "Not Make Believe", "Gift of Screws, "Down on Rodeo", "Someone's Gotta Change Your Mind", and a Rolling Stones cover of "I Am Waiting" were all considered for the track list. "Not Make Believe" was included on the limited edition of Say You Will, "I Am Waiting", "Down on Rodeo", and "Someone's Gotta Change Your Mind" were selected for Buckingham's Under the Skin album in 2006, and "Gift of Screws" appeared on Buckingham's 2008 album of the same name.

The band encountered some difficulties with the sequencing for Say You Will. At the time, Buckingham was mastering the album in Los Angeles and Nicks was in Hawaii, so the two engaged in disagreements on the running order over the phone. According to Nicks, the decision to name the album Say You Will was made by Buckingham the final week she was in Maui. She said the band had referred to the album under the title Strangely Familiar prior to this decision.

== Composition and recording ==
Buckingham wrote "Say Goodbye" soon after his departure from Fleetwood Mac in 1987. He said that the lyrics were "really important" to him, which he wrote during a time when he was aiming to be "compassionate, understanding, and nonjudgmental about the other people in the band, and about everything that had happened." He also expressed satisfaction with the song's instrumentation and believed that the fingerpicking made it "a really nice guitar piece." In an interview with Rolling Stone, Buckingham said that he wrote the song about Nicks "when most of our experience together was behind us." He created both "Say Goodbye" and "Red Rover" around the premise of a guitar underpinning the entire composition, which he likened to his approach to live renditions of "Big Love".

"Come" was a song that Buckingham co-wrote with Neale Heywood, who performed with Fleetwood Mac as a touring guitarist beginning in 1997. In an interview with Classic Rock, Mick Fleetwood identified "Come" as one of his favourite songs on the album along with "Illume". Buckingham wrote "Murrow Turning Over in His Grave" during the murder trial of O.J. Simpson. He centered the song's subject matter around the concentration of media ownership and his belief that Edward R. Murrow would be dismayed about the state of mass media. Buckingham based this assumption on a speech from Murrow where he warned about the dangers of television being used to "delude" and "distract" people.

To round out Say You Will, Nicks brought in new material, along with leftovers from previous albums. When Nicks was recording her Trouble in Shangri-La album in 2001, she left the band 17 songs to develop in her absence. The band picked five, including "Smile at You" and "Goodbye Baby", which were written in 1975–76. "Smile at You" was also rehearsed for the Rumours album in 1977, the Tusk album in 1979, and the Mirage album in 1982. "Running Through the Garden" dated back to 1985 and was based on the short story of "Rappaccini's Daughter" by Nathaniel Hawthorne, although Nicks mistakenly thought that the story originated from an episode from The Twilight Zone during the song's composition. Once the song was finished, Nicks considered the title "Rappaccini's Daughter", but decided against it due to anticipated difficulties with securing publishing rights.

Of the 17 tracks that Nicks submitted, between two and three of them were outtakes from Trouble in Shangri-La. One of those songs was "Thrown Down", which was left off Trouble in Shangri-La and reworked for Say You Will. According to Buckingham, Nicks had previously tried three different mixes of "Thrown Down" with three different people, but none of them worked out. "It was just obvious to me it needed a guitar riff in the chorus. It was a fairly simple thing, for some reason. There seems to be an understanding between us as to what to do."

By the time Nicks returned from her Trouble in Shangri-La tour, the band had made considerable progress on her material. Nicks was pleased with what she heard, but felt obligated to write four additional compositions in December 2001 at her home in Phoenix. She explained in a 2003 interview with DeMain that she did not want the entirety of her contributions on Say You Will to comprise old material and that she preferred the band to use four new compositions of hers rather than pulling from the 17 tracks she submitted to the band while she was on tour. Two of those songs – "Silver Girl" and the title track – feature Sheryl Crow. Nicks commented that "Silver Girl" was "an ode to a rockstar inspired by Sheryl Crow, though it could be turned around and be about Avril Lavigne." Nicks took inspiration from a documentary on the trumpet player Arturo Sandoval when creating the title track. The song also features background vocals from John McVie's daughter Molly, Nicks' niece Jessica, and her friend Maddy Felsch. Nicks wrote "Illume (9–11)" about the September 11 attacks and described it as one of her only songs with political undertones. Nicks wrote two additional songs about 9/11, namely "Get Back on the Plane," and "The Towers Touched the Sky", but neither were included on the album. Her fourth new contribution was titled "Destiny Rules", which was later used as the name for the VH1 video that documented the creation of the album.

Christine McVie was in contact with Fleetwood throughout portions of the recording sessions and expressed interest in writing for the band. "She could have come on board in the early stages of the recording," Fleetwood observed, "but, as time went on, that became more impractical." Nonetheless, the band retained McVie's contributions recorded before her departure, including her vocal and organ overdubs on "Bleed to Love Her".

== Release ==
In February 2003, Say You Will was announced for a release date of 15 April 2003, with a world tour planned to begin in Columbus, Ohio on 7 May 2003. Nigel Williamson clarified in Music & Media that the 15 April release date would be for the United States whereas the album would instead be available in Europe two weeks later.

Prior to the release of Say You Will, the band launched a media campaign with NBC to promote the album. A snippet of "Peacekeeper" appeared on the NBC show Third Watch in February. Appearances on the network were also arranged throughout the month of April, including a performance on the Today show and a band profile/interview on Dateline NBC. Say You Will was the first album in the United Kingdom to be simultaneously released on DVD-Audio and CD according to Music Week.

Say You Will was prefaced by the release of "Peacekeeper" as the album's lead single in the United States. It was serviced to AC, Hot AC and Triple A radio stations in March. In the UK, where "Peacekeeper" was released as a radio-only single, WEA established a promotional strategy by primarily promoting the album through printed publications and advertisements in addition to retail. The company also planned a round of television advertising to coincide with a documentary about the making of Say You Will. Say You Will debuted on the US Billboard Hot 100 at No. 3 with sales of 218,000 units. A documentary titled Destiny Rules was released in March 2004, which featured footage that was filmed during the band's recording sessions at The Bellagio House.

== Critical reception ==
Professional ratings
Aggregate scores
Source	Rating
Metacritic	66/100
Review scores
Source	Rating
AllMusic	3/5 stars
Chicago Tribune	(Mixed)
Entertainment Weekly	(Mixed)
Los Angeles Times	2.5/4 stars
People	(Positive)
Rolling Stone	3/5 stars

According to the review aggregator Metacritic, Say You Will received "generally favorable reviews" based on a weighted average score of 66 out of 100 from 8 critic scores. Many reviewers noted the absence of Christine McVie and the album's length. The Chicago Tribune said that McVie's "dusky voice and deft songwriting touch are missed, particularly on an 18-song disc without enough quality tunes to justify its length". They were more complimentary of Buckingham's arrangements, compositions, and production. Entertainment Weekly wrote that "while the album's highlights shine brightly, the absence of the group's least heralded songwriter [Christine McVie] ultimately proves a significant obstacle".

Stephen Thomas Erlewine of AllMusic believed that the album sounded like "Lindsey Buckingham and Stevie Nicks' albums bouncing around on shuffle play, but also [has] occasionally flashing moments that are purely, satisfyingly Fleetwood Mac." Ultimate Classic Rock characterised the album as "a conversation between Lindsey Buckingham and Stevie Nicks, rather than a true band effort." In his book Dark Mirror, Donald Brackett called Say You Will "the best Fleetwood Mac record in years, even with Nicks's shattered voice and monotone nasal renderings." Music Week praised several songs on Say You Will as "really good" and said that the album was "a fine document of a band who have lost little of their edge."

Nicks expressed some criticism of the album after its release, saying that she found the recording experience unenjoyable due arguments between her and Buckingham that persisted throughout the sessions. She also believed that some of her demos were superior to the renditions that made the final album. Buckingham believed that the album lacked some cohesion but was still satisfied with the overall album, particularly his own tracks.

You could sense a dividing line in terms of style with my songs that were not only new and a little bit edgy, but also a bit off the beaten track from the Fleetwood Mac style, as much as we tried to backtrack on it. So whether those two sets of material found any common ground… that would probably be the one thing I could criticize about the album. Having gone through a process that was a little problematic like that, I was happy with my stuff and the overall outcome of the album.

— Lindsey Buckingham

== Track listing ==
Say You Will track listing
No.	Title	Writer(s)	Lead vocals	Length
1.	"What's the World Coming To?"	Lindsey Buckingham, Julian Raymond	Buckingham	3:48
2.	"Murrow Turning Over in His Grave"	Buckingham	Buckingham	4:12
3.	"Illume (9–11)"	Stevie Nicks	Nicks	4:51
4.	"Thrown Down"	Nicks	Nicks	4:02
5.	"Miranda"	Buckingham	Buckingham	4:18
6.	"Red Rover"	Buckingham	Buckingham	3:58
7.	"Say You Will"	Nicks	Nicks	3:49
8.	"Peacekeeper"	Buckingham	Buckingham	4:11
9.	"Come"	Buckingham, Neale Heywood	Buckingham	5:59
10.	"Smile at You"	Nicks	Nicks	4:33
11.	"Running Through the Garden"	Nicks, Ray Kennedy, Gary Nicholson	Nicks	4:34
12.	"Silver Girl"	Nicks	Nicks	3:59
13.	"Steal Your Heart Away"	Buckingham	Buckingham	3:33
14.	"Bleed to Love Her"	Buckingham	Buckingham	4:06
15.	"Everybody Finds Out"	Nicks, Rick Nowels	Nicks	4:29
16.	"Destiny Rules"	Nicks	Nicks	4:26
17.	"Say Goodbye"	Buckingham	Buckingham	3:26
18.	"Goodbye Baby"	Nicks	Nicks	3:52

Deluxe edition bonus disc
No.	Title	Writer(s)	Length
1.	"Love Minus Zero/No Limit"	Bob Dylan	4:11
2.	"Not Make Believe"	Nicks	4:28
3.	"Peacekeeper" (Live from Sessions@AOL)	Buckingham	4:16
4.	"Say You Will" (Live from Sessions@AOL)	Nicks	3:50

Note

- "Bleed to Love Her" was previously available on The Dance as a live version.

== Personnel ==
Fleetwood Mac

- Lindsey Buckingham – vocals, guitars, keyboards, bass guitar, percussion, programming
- Stevie Nicks – vocals, additional keyboards
- John McVie – bass guitar, black keys
- Mick Fleetwood – drums, percussion

Additional musicians

- John Shanks – additional keyboards (1), additional guitars (8)
- Sheryl Crow – backing vocals and Hammond organ (7, 12)
- Jamie Muhoberac – Hammond organ (9)
- Christine McVie – backing vocals (13–14), keyboards (13–14)
- Dave Palmer – acoustic piano (13)
- John Pierce – bass guitar on verses (13)
- Madelyne Felsch, Molly McVie and Jessica James Nicks – backing vocals (7)

Technical personnel

- Lindsey Buckingham – producer, engineer
- Rob Cavallo – producer (5, 6, 9, 13, 14)
- John Shanks – producer (1, 8)
- Ken Allardyce – engineer
- Ken Koroshetz – engineer
- Ray Lindsey – engineer, band technician
- Mark Needham – engineer, mixing (1–15, 17, 18)
- Chris Lord-Alge – mixing (16)
- Bernie Grundman – mastering
- Joe Bozzi – mastering assistant
- Mike Fasano – band technician
- Bruce Jacoby – band technician
- Garner Knutsen – band technician
- Mike Zablow – band technician
- Stephen Walker – art direction
- Keith Carter – "Hands 1991" photography
- Karen Johnston – photography
- Neal Preston – photography
- Herbert W. Worthington – photography

Studios

- Recorded at The Bellagio House; Ocean Way Recording (Hollywood, California); Lindsey's garage (Los Angeles, California); Cornerstone Studios (Chatsworth, California).
- Mixed at Cornerstone Studios; Conway Studios (Hollywood, California); Image Recording Studios (Los Angeles, California).
- Mastered at Bernie Grundman Mastering (Hollywood, California).

== Charts ==
=== Weekly charts ===
Weekly chart performance for Say You Will
Chart (2003)	Peak position
Australian Albums (ARIA)	24
Belgian Albums (Ultratop Wallonia)	38
Canadian Albums (Billboard)	8
Danish Albums (Hitlisten)	40
Dutch Albums (Album Top 100)	28
European Albums (Music & Media)	12
French Albums (SNEP)	113
German Albums (Offizielle Top 100)	10
Irish Albums (IRMA)	6
Japanese Albums (Oricon)	108
New Zealand Albums (RMNZ)	7
Norwegian Albums (VG-lista)	23
Scottish Albums (Official Charts)	5
Spanish Albums (AFYVE)	51
Swedish Albums (Sverigetopplistan)	8
Swiss Albums (Schweizer Hitparade)	51
UK Albums (Official Charts)	6
US Billboard 200	3

=== Year-end charts ===
Year-end chart performance for Say You Will
Chart (2003)	Position
UK Albums (OCC)	138
US Billboard 200	84

== Certifications ==
Certifications for Say You Will
Region	Certification	Certified units/sales
Canada (Music Canada)	Gold	50,000^{^}
New Zealand (RMNZ)	Gold	7,500^{^}
United Kingdom (BPI)	Gold	100,000^{^}
United States (RIAA)	Gold	500,000^{^}
^{^} Shipments figures based on certification alone.

== Music promo videos ==
Music videos were shot for "Peacekeeper" and "Say You Will", both of these videos were stage performances of both songs. Neither of these videos were commercially available until 2019, when Fleetwood Mac published these videos on their official YouTube channel.
