= Under the Skin (Lindsey Buckingham album) =

Studio album by Lindsey Buckingham
- Released: October 3, 2006
- Recorded: 1995–2004
- Studios: L.B.'s house Ocean Way Recording (Hollywood, California)
- Genre: Acoustic rock
- Length: 45:01
- Label: Reprise
- Producers: Lindsey Buckingham; Rob Cavallo (tracks 9 & 10)

Lindsey Buckingham chronology
Out of the Cradle (1992)	Under the Skin (2006)	Gift of Screws (2008)

Singles from Under the Skin
- 1. "Show You How" Released: September 2006

Under the Skin is the fourth solo album by American musician and Fleetwood Mac vocalist/guitarist Lindsey Buckingham, released on October 3, 2006. The album, long delayed by Fleetwood Mac's reunion tour in the 1990s and 2003 album Say You Will, was his first solo release since Out of the Cradle 14 years prior.

Much of the material on Under Skin was primarily centered around vocals and acoustic guitars. Buckingham played most of the instruments on the album, with a few tracks featuring contributions from his Fleetwood Mac bandmates Mick Fleetwood and John McVie, both of whom played on "Down on Rodeo".

Upon its release, which was handled by Reprise Records, the album debuted and peaked at No. 80 on the US Billboard 200. He followed up this album with a tour across the United States.

On November 27, 2026, Rhino Records will be releasing a limited-edition vinyl version of Under the Skin as part of Record Store Day Black Friday to commemorate the album's 20th anniversary. This release, which is limited to 3,650 copies, will be the first time that Under the Skin has been available in a vinyl format. It will be pressed on tan translucent vinyl and packaged in a single pocket record sleeve.

== Background ==
Predominantly an acoustic album, the album does not feature many instruments besides acoustic guitar and percussion. Buckingham sought to forgo the more ornate elements on his previous albums in favor of orienting compositions around vocals and a single guitar. When approaching the album, Buckingham said that he was drawn to Joni Mitchell's Blue. He wanted to deviate from that approach by "screw[ing] it up somehow with some production" while also keeping the instrumentation "very simple and very minimal".

Buckingham wrote most of the material for Under the Skin while he was touring with Fleetwood Mac. He recorded the material on a Korg 16-track unit and mixed them onto CDs in hotel rooms during days off from live performances. He also used a Roland delay on his vocals and said that the recording process was conducted "in an orderly, overdubbed manner, but with just the limitations that I wanted to impose on the tracks." The album's title track was one of the songs that Buckingham recorded in a hotel room, using an acoustic guitar in an Open G tuning with a capo on the third fret.

In an interview with Sound & Vision, Buckingham discussed his approach in recording Under the Skin, saying that "it was kind of freeing to be able to overdo the vocal effects and processed guitars yet have the sound be so transparent. I just went for what excited me." When writing the lyrics for the material on Under the Skin Buckingham drew inspiration from developments in his personal life, including his marriage and experience as a father. He commented that the album "gets into a more bare-bones look at what's going on with me after all this time."

== Songs ==
"Not Too Late", the album's opening track, features Buckingham playing guitar arpeggios using an extended Travis picking technique. The song's opening line was written in reference to a Rolling Stone review by Bud Scoppa where he called Buckingham a visionary. This review prompted Buckingham to contemplate how this assessment applied to his motivation for continuing as a musician and how it affected him within the context of being a father. Commenting on the matter, Buckingham said that "it made me realize that what I have been striving for probably is based on feeling a little bit unseen or misunderstood."

Buckingham covered "I Am Waiting" by The Rolling Stones on a Turner thin-bodied acoustic guitar with a Roland Corporation guitar synthesizer, a device that provided what Buckingham described as a "chamber orchestra effect". "I Am Waiting" was one of several Rolling Stones songs that Buckingham had recorded, with others including, "The Singer Not the Song", "She Smiled Sweetly", and "Gotta Get Away". He felt that his cover of "I Am Waiting" was the most suitable of these for inclusion on Under the Skin, which he attributed to his rendition's arrangement. On this song and his cover of "Try For the Sun", Buckingham rearranged them to be in 6/8 time. The lyrics for "It Was You" reference Buckingham's three children by name.

"Down on Rodeo", which was written about Buckingham's brief relationship with Anne Heche, and "Someone's Gotta Change Your Mind" are the only two songs on the record with contributions from outside musicians. These two songs, along with "To Try For the Sun", were also included on a Gift of Screws bootleg that was leaked online in 2001. "Someone's Gotta Change Your Mind" and "Down on Rodeo" predated the other songs on Under the Skin and were recorded with Rob Cavallo ten years prior at Ocean Way Recording in Hollywood. He said that these songs were already "mixed and ready to go" for Fleetwood Mac's Say You Will album, released in 2003. Some tracks on Under the Skin were also recorded at Buckingham's home studio on a 48-track machine.

The album's final track, "Flying Down Juniper", related to Buckingham's time growing up in Palo Alto, California, which had a street named Juniper near his parents' house that Buckingham would ride down when he was a kid. Originally written as a slower song, Buckingham did not initially intend to include "Flying Down Juniper" on Under the Skin, but later amended his position after deciding that it served as a companion song to the title track, both of which were centered around major seventh chords. When Buckingham was completing a take for "Flying Down Juniper", Buckingham's son Will beckoned him for dinner through the studio intercom, which was caught on tape. "I'd just finished the take, and all of a sudden, 'Dinner, Daddy!' So I had to leave it in. It's a perfect ending." Buckingham remembered that he received some pushback for the song's inclusion on Under the Skin.

My wife calls it the Love Boat song...A lot of people said, "Don't put that on the record, it's terrible! And I thought, well okay, maybe it is, but you can get away with a lot when it's the last song on the record.

== Release ==
Under the Skin was announced in August 2006, with the release date planned for October 3rd of that year. In an accompanying press release, Buckingham described the album as a "kind of a reduction" with "basically no drums, very little bass". USA Today also reported that a US tour would accompany the release of Under the Skin and that a "more rocking" companion album from Buckingham would follow in 2007.

Under the Skin peaked at number 80 on the US Billboard 200 album chart in October 2006. In the United States, the album sold 13,000 copies during its first week of release, with 32 percent of those sales coming from purchases on the Internet. "Show You How" was also released as a single but failed to chart.

Buckingham recalled that the album received a lukewarm response from Warner Brothers, who expressed a lack of interest in promoting it. "When I turned in Under The Skin, their general response was 'Yeah we'll put it out, but don't expect us to do too much.'" Warner Brothers requested the addition of more conventional rock songs to make the album more marketable. He ultimately declined, believing that the track listing he had selected was already satisfactory. Buckingham said that he planned on releasing a more rock-oriented album within a year of Under the Skin. Eight songs had already been completed for the planned follow-up by the time Under the Skin was released.

== Critical reception ==
Professional ratings
Aggregate scores
Source	Rating
Metacritic	80/100
Review scores
Source	Rating
AllMusic	4/5 stars
Classic Rock	7/10 stars
The Guardian	4/5 stars
The Music Box	5/5 stars
Pitchfork	3.5/5 stars
Rolling Stone	3.5/5 stars

According to the review aggregator Metacritic, Under the Skin received "generally favorable reviews" based on a weighted average score of 80 out of 100 from 15 critic scores. AllMusic writer Thom Jurek noted how several songs felt autobiographical and described the album as "the most nakedly visible and tender recording he's ever dropped."

Chris Willman of Entertainment Weekly complimented Buckingham's "frantic" guitar fingerpicking and said that his production work enhanced the sound of his nylon-string guitar. Willman added that despite the album's nominally stripped back nature, some of Buckingham's recording techniques, including the use of mulitracked vocals, prevented the album from being truly unplugged. Brian Hiatt of Rolling Stone thought that Buckingham achieved "maximum effect from minimal arrangements" and said that "Down on Rodeo" resembled a "lost Fleetwood Mac hit."

Mat Snow of The Guardian called the album "a small masterpiece of tightly balanced musical contrasts." Writing for The Phoenix, Mikael Wood characterized the album's tracks as "gripping little creations, full of weird acoustic-guitar riffs and uncomfortably intimate vocals".

== Track listing ==
All songs composed by Lindsey Buckingham except where noted.

No.	Title	Length
1.	"Not Too Late"	4:42
2.	"Show You How"	4:21
3.	"Under the Skin"	3:56
4.	"I Am Waiting" (Mick Jagger, Keith Richards)	3:34
5.	"It Was You"	2:48
6.	"To Try for the Sun" (Donovan)	3:14
7.	"Cast Away Dreams"	4:28
8.	"Shut Us Down" (Lindsey Buckingham, Cory Sipper)	3:57
9.	"Down on Rodeo"	4:27
10.	"Someone's Gotta Change Your Mind"	4:48
11.	"Flying Down Juniper"	4:43

Additional tracks
No.	Title	Length
12.	"Go Your Own Way" (live; iTunes-exclusive bonus track)	4:56
13.	"Say Goodbye" (live, featuring Stevie Nicks; Barnes & Noble-exclusive bonus track)

== Personnel ==
Main performer

- Lindsey Buckingham – vocals, guitars, bass, keyboards, percussion

Additional personnel

- John McVie – bass (9)
- Mick Fleetwood – drums (9, 10), percussion (9, 10)
- David Campbell – orchestration (10)

=== Production ===
- Lindsey Buckingham – producer, recording (1–8, 11), mixing (1–8, 11), additional photography
- Rob Cavallo – producer (9, 10)
- Ken Allardyce – recording (9, 10)
- Mark Needham – mixing (9, 10)
- Brian Gardner – mastering
- Bernie Grundman Mastering (Hollywood, California) – mastering location
- Frank Ockenfels III – photography
- Stephen Walker – art direction
- Tony Dimitriades – management
- Robert Richards – management

== Music promo videos ==
Three promotional music videos were shot for Under the Skin, these included "It Was You", "Show You How" and "Shut Us Down". Both "It Was You" and "Show You How" are available for digital download via iTunes, but the video for "Shut Us Down" remains unavailable.

== Chart performance ==
Chart (2006)	Peak position
US Billboard 200	80
