= The Dance (Fleetwood Mac album) =

Live album by Fleetwood Mac
- Released: 19 August 1997
- Recorded: 23 May 1997
- Venues: Warner Brothers Studios, Burbank, California
- Genres: Rock, pop
- Length: 79:11
- Label: Reprise
- Producers: Lindsey Buckingham, Elliot Scheiner

Fleetwood Mac chronology
Time (1995)	The Dance (1997)	The Very Best of Fleetwood Mac (2002)

Professional ratings
Review scores
Source	Rating
AllMusic	2.5/5 stars
Christgau's Consumer Guide: Albums of the '90s	(neither)
Uncut	3/5 stars

The Dance is a live album by the British-American rock band Fleetwood Mac, released on 19 August 1997. It hailed the return of the band's most successful lineup of Mick Fleetwood, John McVie, Christine McVie, Stevie Nicks, and Lindsey Buckingham who had not released an album together since 1987's Tango in the Night, a decade earlier. It was the first Fleetwood Mac release to top the U.S. album charts since 1982's Mirage.

== History ==
Recorded during a concert on 23 May 1997, The Dance was the last Fleetwood Mac album to feature Christine McVie as a full-time member before she left a year after the album's release (she would return to tour with the band in 2014). Debuting at No. 1 on the Billboard 200 with sales of 199,000, The Dance became the fifth best-selling live album of all time in the United States, selling a million copies within eight weeks, spending more than seven months within the top 40, and eventually selling over six million copies worldwide. The DVD version has been certified 9× platinum in Australia for selling 135,000 copies.

Unlike 1980's Live, which was a collection of live recordings over a series of 60 shows, The Dance was recorded in one night, albeit with good isolation to allow for overdubs. The concert was recorded for Fleetwood Mac's MTV The Dance special at Warner Brothers Studios in Burbank, California, and features the University of Southern California Marching Band who perform on the tracks "Tusk" (having played on the original studio recording) and "Don't Stop". Buckingham originally wanted less overlap in the track listing between The Dance and their 1980 live album. "At first I thought this should be a more eclectic collection, with different songs that were a little more surprising. But Warner was very upset about that. They wanted more hits. They felt a live album from 1981 was irrelevant, and I guess they were right."

Although the album is predominantly a live greatest hits package, The Dance also features new material written by each of the primary songwriting members of the band (with two from Buckingham) as well as popular album tracks. "Bleed to Love Her" was a previously unreleased track when The Dance was released, although a studio recording of the song was later included on the Say You Will (2003) album. Buckingham said that the band initially intended to include three new songs for The Dance until they ran-through "Bleed to Love Her", which he had previously worked on with Fleetwood in the recording studio for a solo album. The band determined that the arrangement worked well, so they decided to keep it in the set, bringing the number of new songs up to four in total. No tracks from the Mirage album were included on the CD, although "Gypsy" was included in the video and DVD versions.

"Say You Love Me" received a folk rearrangement that featured a banjo and cocktail drum kit. John McVie also sang backing vocals for this performance.

The album was titled for Henri Matisse's painting, Dance, which was at one point intended to be used as the album cover but was unable to be licensed. The album cover photo, taken by David LaChapelle, has Mick Fleetwood recreating his pose from the cover of Rumours, the band's most successful album, and Lindsey Buckingham holding the cane used on the cover of the Fleetwood Mac album, Rumours' predecessor.

== Release ==
In July 1997, PR Newswire announced that The Dance live album was assigned a release date of 19 August, with the home video being slated for release the following week; the release date for the DVD was planned for 23 September. Image Entertainment handled the distribution of the LaserDisc, which was released on the same day as the DVD. The home video, DVD, and LaserDisc contained some songs not included on the album, including "Songbird" and "Go Insane". An MTV special and a Making of Rumours special on VH1 were also announced for the month of August to promote The Dance.

The album spawned three singles in the US: "Silver Springs", "The Chain", and "Landslide" and earned the band three Grammy nominations in 1998, in the categories of "Best Pop Album", "Best Rock Performance by a Group or Duo with Vocal" for "The Chain" and "Best Pop Performance by a Duo or Group with Vocals" for "Silver Springs". A fourth single, "Temporary One," was released in certain countries, including Australia and Germany.

The band later embarked on a 44-date tour across the United States with one stop in Canada in support of The Dance. The setlist was similar to that of the album, but with "Over My Head" being replaced by "Oh Daddy", "Second Hand News", "Stand Back", "Farmer's Daughter" (a cover of the Beach Boys song from Surfin' U.S.A.), and "Not That Funny". "Eyes of the World" was played instead of "Second Hand News" on opening night in Hartford, Connecticut.

== Track listing ==
=== CD version ===
CD track listing
No.	Title	Writer(s)	Length
1.	"The Chain"	Christine McVie; Stevie Nicks; Lindsey Buckingham; Mick Fleetwood; John McVie	5:11
2.	"Dreams"	Nicks	4:39
3.	"Everywhere"	C. McVie	3:28
4.	"Rhiannon"	Nicks	6:48
5.	"I'm So Afraid"	Buckingham	7:45
6.	"Temporary One (Note: Unreleased in studio form.)"	C. McVie; Eddy Quintela	4:00
7.	"Bleed to Love Her (Note: Studio version later recorded on the album Say You Will.)"	Buckingham	3:27
8.	"Big Love"	Buckingham	3:06
9.	"Landslide"	Nicks	4:27
10.	"Say You Love Me"	C. McVie	4:59
11.	"My Little Demon"	Buckingham	3:33
12.	"Silver Springs"	Nicks	5:41
13.	"You Make Loving Fun"	C. McVie	3:49
14.	"Sweet Girl (Note: Studio version later released on Stevie Nicks' Enchanted box set.)"	Nicks	3:19
15.	"Go Your Own Way"	Buckingham	5:00
16.	"Tusk"	Buckingham	4:22
17.	"Don't Stop"	C. McVie	5:28
Total length:			79:11

=== Video track listing ===
The DVD video is in 1.33:1 aspect ratio, while audio is in Dolby Digital 5.1 surround and PCM stereo.

VHS/DVD/LD track listing
No.	Title	Writer(s)	Length
1.	"The Chain"	Buckingham; Fleetwood; C. McVie; J. McVie; Nicks
2.	"Dreams"	Nicks
3.	"Everywhere"	C. McVie
4.	"Gold Dust Woman (Note: Does not appear on the CD, but was released as a B-side on a German CD single of "Silver Springs".)"	Nicks
5.	"I'm So Afraid"	Buckingham
6.	"Temporary One"	C. McVie; Quintela
7.	"Bleed to Love Her"	Buckingham
8.	"Gypsy (Note: Does not appear on the CD, but was released as a B-side of "Silver Springs" and as a standalone digital single.)"	Nicks
9.	"Big Love"	Buckingham
10.	"Go Insane (Note: Does not appear on the CD, but was released as a B-side of "Silver Springs" and on the 2CD edition of The Very Best of Fleetwood Mac.)"	Buckingham
11.	"Landslide"	Nicks
12.	"Say You Love Me"	C. McVie
13.	"You Make Loving Fun"	C. McVie
14.	"My Little Demon"	Buckingham
15.	"Silver Springs"	Nicks
16.	"Over My Head"	C. McVie
17.	"Rhiannon"	Nicks
18.	"Sweet Girl"	Nicks
19.	"Go Your Own Way"	Buckingham
20.	"Tusk"	Buckingham
21.	"Don't Stop"	C. McVie
22.	"Songbird"	C. McVie

== Personnel ==
Fleetwood Mac

- Stevie Nicks – vocals, tambourine
- Lindsey Buckingham – vocals, guitars, banjo on "Say You Love Me"
- Christine McVie – vocals, keyboards, acoustic piano, accordion on "Tusk", tambourine on "Say You Love Me", maracas on "Everywhere"
- John McVie – bass guitar, backing vocals on "Say You Love Me"
- Mick Fleetwood – drums, percussion

Additional musicians

- Scott Pinkerton – synthesizer programming
- Brett Tuggle – keyboards, guitars, backing vocals
- Neale Heywood – guitars, backing vocals
- Lenny Castro – percussion
- Sharon Celani – backing vocals
- Mindy Stein – backing vocals
- Dr. Arthur C. Bartner – director of the USC Trojan Marching Band

Fleetwood Mac crew

- Marty Hom – tour manager
- Paul Chavarria – production manager
- Sam Emerson - stage manager
- Edd Kolakowski – piano tech
- Ray Lindsey – guitar tech
- Todd Bowie – guitar tech
- Steve Dikun – bass tech
- Walter Earl – drum tech
- Mike Fasano – drum tech
- Bruce Jackson – FOH sound
- Chris Lantz – monitors
- Chris Fulton – Clair Bros.
- Mark Dowdle – Clair Bros.
- Kim Brakeley – wardrobe stylist
- Jill Focke – assistant wardrobe
- Margi Kent – clothing designer for Nicks
- Barbara Buck – makeup
- Elaine Offers – makeup
- Karen Johnston – assistant to Nicks
- Steve Real – vocal coach
- Sara Sierra – hair
- Robert Ramos – hair
- Richard Perea – assistant/runner
- Mark Candelario, Jen Dreisen – runners
- Edward O'Hickey III – WB stage
- Fred Hammond, Jim Callahan – WB security

CD production

- Lindsey Buckingham – producer
- Elliot Scheiner – producer, engineer, mixing
- Barry Goldberg – engineer
- Guy Charbonneau – additional engineer
- Charlie Bouis – assistant engineer
- John Nelson – assistant engineer
- Paul DeCarli – digital editing
- Scott Humphrey – digital editing
- Ted Jensen – mastering at Sterling Sound (New York, NY)
- Ted Barela – technical assistance
- David Gallo – technical assistance
- Eric Johnston – technical assistance
- Ph. D – art direction, design
- David LaChapelle – photography
- Neal Preston – photography

Video production

- Bruce Gower – director
- Lindsey Buckingham – producer
- Elliot Scheiner – producer, recording, mixing
- Barry Goldberg – recording
- David LaChapelle – photography
- Neal Preston – photography
- Dr. Arthur C. Bartner – director of the USC Marching Band

== Charts ==
=== Weekly charts ===
Chart (1997)	Peak position
Australian Albums (ARIA)	4
Belgian Albums (Ultratop Flanders)	37
Canada Top Albums/CDs (RPM)	19
Dutch Albums (Album Top 100)	4
German Albums (Offizielle Top 100)	20
New Zealand Albums (RMNZ)	12
Norwegian Albums (VG-lista)	33
Scottish Albums (Official Charts)	32
Swedish Albums (Sverigetopplistan)	39
UK Albums (Official Charts)	15
US Billboard 200	1

=== Year-end charts ===
Chart (1997)	Position
Australian Albums (ARIA)	31
Dutch Albums (Album Top 100)	85
US Billboard 200	36

Chart (1998)	Position
US Billboard 200	32

Chart (2013)	Position
UK Albums (OCC)	83

=== Singles ===
Year	Single	Chart	Position
1997	"The Chain"	Mainstream Rock Tracks	30
1998	"Landslide"	Adult Contemporary	10
1998	"Landslide"	Adult Top 40	26
1998	"Landslide"	Billboard Hot 100	51

== Certifications ==
Album release

Region	Certification	Certified units/sales
Australia (ARIA)	Platinum	70,000^{^}
Canada (Music Canada)	Platinum	100,000^{^}
New Zealand (RMNZ)	Platinum	15,000^{^}
United Kingdom (BPI)	Platinum	300,000^{‡}
United States (RIAA)	5× Platinum	5,000,000^{^}
^{^} Shipments figures based on certification alone.^{‡} Sales+streaming figures based on certification alone.

Video release

Region	Certification	Certified units/sales
Australia (ARIA) DVD edition	9× Platinum	135,000^{^}
New Zealand (RMNZ)	6× Platinum	30,000^{^}
United Kingdom (BPI)	Platinum	50,000^{^}
United States (RIAA)	Platinum	100,000^{^}
^{^} Shipments figures based on certification alone.
