= Wicked Game (Chris Isaak album) =

Compilation album by Chris Isaak
- Released: January 14, 1991
- Genre: Roots rock; rockabilly
- Length: 45:39
- Label: Reprise
- Producer: Erik Jacobsen

Chris Isaak chronology
Heart Shaped World (1989)	Wicked Game (1991)	San Francisco Days (1993)

Professional ratings
Review scores
Source	Rating
AllMusic	3/5 stars
NME	8/10

Wicked Game is a compilation album by American singer and songwriter Chris Isaak, released in 1991 by WEA on the Reprise Records label in the UK, Europe and Australia. It contains 11 songs from Isaak's first three studio albums.

== Background and content ==
In early 1991, after the song "Wicked Game" went top 10 in the UK and top 15 in Australia, a division of Warner Music Group, WEA released the album Wicked Game. Compiled by Phil Knox-Roberts of WEA UK, it contains highlights of Isaak's recording career to that point. Three of the songs are taken from his 1985 debut album Silvertone: "Dancin'", "Voodoo" and "Funeral in the Rain", four from his 1986 album, Chris Isaak: "Blue Hotel", "Lie to Me", "Heart Full of Soul" (a cover of The Yardbirds 1965 top 10 hit) and "You Owe Me Some Kind of Love", and four from 1989's Heart Shaped World: "Wicked Game", "Nothing's Changed", "Blue Spanish Sky" and "Heart Shaped World". An instrumental version of the song "Wicked Game", from the 1990 David Lynch film Wild at Heart, is also included. The album was released on CD and LP. "Blue Hotel" was re-released as a single in support of the album, reaching No. 17 in the UK and No. 23 in Australia.

Warner Music Canada eventually added Wicked Game to their regular CD catalogue after years of it being a steady import seller.

== Video compilation ==
A VHS video compilation containing five videos of Isaak's songs was released, including "Wicked Game" (directed by Herb Ritts), "Dancin'" (Mary Lambert), "You Owe Me Some Kind of Love" (Jean-Baptiste Mondino), "Blue Hotel" (Mark Lebon) and "Don't Make Me Dream About You" (Geoffrey Barish). "Don't Make Me Dream About You" from Heart Shaped World was not included on the Wicked Game album.

== Track listing ==
All tracks written by Chris Isaak, except where noted.

No.	Title	Writer(s)	Length
1.	"Wicked Game"		4:46
2.	"You Owe Me Some Kind of Love"		3:51
3.	"Blue Spanish Sky"		3:57
4.	"Heart Shaped World"		3:26
5.	"Heart Full of Soul"	Graham Gouldman	3:20
6.	"Funeral in the Rain"		3:18
7.	"Blue Hotel"		3:10
8.	"Dancin'"		3:44
9.	"Nothing's Changed"		4:05
10.	"Voodoo"		2:44
11.	"Lie to Me"		4:12
12.	"Wicked Game" (Instrumental)		4:48

== Personnel ==
Adapted from the album's liner notes.

Musicians

- Chris Isaak – lead vocals, guitar
- James Calvin Wilsey – lead guitar
- Rowland Salley – bass guitar, vocals
- Kenney Dale Johnson – drums, vocals
- Prairie Prince, Chris Solberg, Pat Craig, Christine Wall, Cynthia Lloyd – additional musicians

Technical

- Erik Jacobsen – producer
- Mark Needham, Lee Hershchberg, Tom Mallon, Dave Carlson – engineering
- Ric Lopez – front cover photograph
- Michael Zagaris, Pamela Gentile – live band photographs
- Henry Diltz – additional photography
- Wherefore Art? – design
- Phil Knox-Roberts – album compiler

== Charts ==
=== Weekly charts ===
Chart (1991)	Peak position
Australian Albums (ARIA)	8
Austrian Albums (Ö3 Austria)	6
Dutch Albums (Album Top 100)	3
German Albums (Offizielle Top 100)	3
Hungarian Albums (MAHASZ)	35
New Zealand Albums (RMNZ)	3
Norwegian Albums (VG-lista)	6
Swedish Albums (Sverigetopplistan)	2
Swiss Albums (Schweizer Hitparade)	4
UK Albums (OCC)	3

=== Year-end charts ===
Chart (1991)	Position
Australian Albums (ARIA)	34
Dutch Albums (Album Top 100)	15
German Albums (Offizielle Top 100)	26
New Zealand Albums (RMNZ)	36
Swiss Albums (Schweizer Hitparade)	33

== Certifications and sales ==
Certifications and sales for Wicked Game
Region	Certification	Certified units/sales
Australia (ARIA)	3× Platinum	210,000^{^}
Finland (Musiikkituottajat)	Platinum	59,682
France (SNEP)	Platinum	300,000^{*}
Germany (BVMI)	Gold	250,000^{^}
Netherlands (NVPI)	Platinum	100,000^{^}
Spain (PROMUSICAE)	Platinum	100,000^{^}
Sweden (GLF)	Gold	50,000^{^}
Switzerland (IFPI Switzerland)	Gold	25,000^{^}
United Kingdom (BPI)	2× Platinum	600,000^{^}
^{*} Sales figures based on certification alone.^{^} Shipments figures based on certification alone.
