= Jeff Dahl Band =

- Origin: Cave Creek, Arizona, U.S.
- Genres: Punk rock
- Years active: 1976–present
- Labels: Steel Cage Records
- Members: Jeff Dahl; Frank Labor; Jason Smith; Russ Covner
- Past members: Andy Madison

The Jeff Dahl Band is an American punk rock ensemble, formed in Cave Creek, Arizona, United States in 1976. Jeff Dahl recorded his first single, "Rock N Roll Critic", in 1977 and it was released on the Doodley Squat label.

Since then Dahl served time in Vox Pop (who included Germs, 45 Grave and Dream Syndicate members), The Angry Samoans (1985, stepped in for "Metal" Mike Saunders), and Powertrip, as well as playing and recording with Cheetah Chrome and Rikk Agnew.

There are approximately 26 albums released by the Jeff Dahl Band (including studio, live, bootlegs, and best of collections), and in the neighborhood of 100 singles. Some are in print, most are not. Dahl has done extensive touring and studio production work in the U.S., Europe and Japan.

== Incomplete discography ==
=== Albums ===
- I Kill Me (1990)
- Ultra-Under (1991)
- Have Faith (1991)
- Wicked (1991)
- Wasted Remains of a Disturbing Childhood (1993)
- Scratch up some action/Pussyfart K.O. (1993)
- Leather Frankenstein (1994)
- Bliss (1995)
- French Cough Syrup (1996)
- Heart Full Of Snot (1997)
- All Trashed Up (1999)
- Pancake 31 (2000)
- Best of Jeff Dahl, Vol. 1 (2003)
- Cursed, Poisoned, Condemned (2005)
- Street Fighting Reptile (2005)
- Battered Stuff: One Acoustic Mother (2007)

=== Splits ===
- Poison Idea & Jeff Dahl (1992)
- Atlantic Crossover (2003) (with Diamond Dogs)

=== Singles ===
- "Have Faith" (1994)

=== Compilation albums ===
- AZPUNK.COMP V3 (2004)
- The A-Z of AZ Rock (2006)
