= The '90s Suck and So Do You =

Studio album by Angry Samoans
- Released: February 19, 1999
- Genre: Punk
- Length: 13:17
- Label: Triple X Records

Angry Samoans chronology
The Unboxed Set (1995)	The '90s Suck and So Do You (1999)	Fuck the War EP (2006)

Professional ratings
Review scores
Source	Rating
Allmusic	3/5 stars
Rolling Stone Album Guide	2.5/5 stars

The '90s Suck and So Do You is the fourth studio album by punk band Angry Samoans, released in 1999. It was their first studio album since 1988's STP Not LSD, but featured only two original members - vocalist Mike Saunders and drummer Bill Vockeroth.

== Track listing ==
- All songs by Mike Saunders unless noted.
1. " I'd Rather Do the Dog" - 1:27
2. "Letter from Uncle Sam" - 1:06
3. "Suzy's a Loser" - 2:19
4. "In and Out of Luv" - 1:08
5. "Mister M.D." - 1:39
6. "My Baby's Gone Gone Gone" - 1:45
7. "Beat Your Heart Out" - 1:37 (Robert Lopez)
8. "Don't Change My Head" - 2:15

== Personnel ==
- "Metal Mike" Saunders - vocals, guitar
- Alison "Wonderslam" Victor - guitar, bass, vocals
- Tony Palmer - bass guitar
- Julia Altstatt - bass
- Bill Vockeroth - drums
