= White Noise Records =

White Noise Records was a record label founded in Los Angeles in 1978 by artists Ronn and Louise Spencer, writers Nicole Panter and Jim Bickhart, attorneys Gordon Rubin and Peter Paterno, and publicist Bob Merlis.

White Noise's first release was the 7-inch EP Live at Surf City (1978) by VOM, a short-lived punk ensemble led by notorious rock critic Richard Meltzer and featuring future Angry Samoans Gregg Turner and "Metal" Mike Saunders.

The label's second release was Avengers, a 1979 12-inch EP by the Avengers, produced by Steve Jones of the Sex Pistols.

The label closed in 1980, but was briefly revived in the 1990s by archivist Keith Bollinger, who released historic recordings by The Mutants, Rozz Rezabek, Young Canadians, and Rubber City Rebels. White Noise's final release in 2003 was a live recording of the 1978 Miner's Benefit at San Francisco's legendary Mabuhay Gardens, featuring performances by U.X.A., Sleepers, Negative Trend, and Tuxedomoon.

The original White Noise Records is not affiliated with a newer label using the same name in Providence, Rhode Island.

== See also ==
- List of record labels
