= Zero Hour (Avengers album) =

Live album by Avengers
- Released: 2003
- Recorded: June 13, 1979
- Genre: Punk rock
- Length: 28:02
- Label: Get Back

Avengers chronology
| Died for Your Sins (1999) | Zero Hour (2003) | The American in Me (2004) |

Zero Hour is a live album by the Avengers. It was released on a vinyl in 2003 on the Italian label DBK Works. The album features a recording of the band's final concert that took place at the Old Waldorf, San Francisco, CA on June 13, 1979. The same concert was released a year later on the compilation album The American in Me.

== Track listing ==
=== Side One ===
1. "Cheap Tragedies" – 3:30
2. "Zero Hour" – 3:23
3. "Corpus Christi" – 3:04
4. "Release Me" – 4:33

=== Side Two ===
1. "Uh-Oh" – 3:23
2. "Misery (Finger On The Trigger)" – 3:05
3. "Time To Die" – 5:05
4. "The American In Me" – 2:10

== Personnel ==
- Penelope Houston – vocalist
- Brad Kent – guitarist
- Danny Furious – drummer
- Jimmy Wilsey – bass
