= Back from Samoa =

Studio album by Angry Samoans
- Released: 1982
- Genre: Hardcore punk
- Length: 17:38
- Label: Triple X Records

Angry Samoans chronology
Inside My Brain (1980)	Back from Samoa (1982)	Yesterday Started Tomorrow (1986)

Professional ratings
Review scores
Source	Rating
AllMusic	4/5 stars
Christgau's Record Guide	A
The Encyclopedia of Popular Music	3/5 stars
Spin Alternative Record Guide	9/10

Back from Samoa is the debut full-length album by the American punk rock band Angry Samoans. It was released in 1982 on Bad Trip Records.

== Production ==
After the release of Inside My Brain, "Metal Mike" Saunders left the group and was replaced by Jeff Dahl. The impasse they had created locally with the influential Rodney Bingenheimer meant the band had trouble playing in Los Angeles, forcing them to play shows in the suburbs. When they began to play in the emerging suburban hardcore scene, with bands such as Suicidal Tendencies, they sped up their own songs accordingly. The band began recording Back From Samoa and had completed approximately two-thirds of the record, when Mike Saunders returned, forcing the band to re-record all of the vocals. The album contains a cover of The Chambers Brothers' "Time Has Come Today", which was written by Joe and Willie Chambers. In their video, a bunker scene is included, where Joe Chambers makes an appearance. In the scene, the lead singer of the Angry Samoans is about to push the nuclear button which would cause nuclear annihilation. However, the president (Played by Joe Chambers) chooses life.

== Critical reception ==
Trouser Press wrote that "the brief, well-played songs on Back From Samoa have cool titles ... but the lyrics are rarely as clever." Alternative Press called the album "hilarious," writing that it "rocks like a spastic colon." The Spin Alternative Record Guide wrote that "the extremism of this viciously witty, explosive thrash is compelling, perhaps because it's rooted in self-hatred."

== Artwork ==
The cover image is an altered still taken from the 1959 sci-fi film The Monster of Piedras Blancas. The back cover features a photo of the band, with vocalist Mike Saunders wearing a "Fried Abortions" t-shirt, which was the name of a musical side-project he was a member of. There is a Holley Performance Products sticker on the body of the guitar slung over Mike's shoulder.

== Track listing ==
1. "Gas Chamber" – 1:02 ("Metal Mike" Saunders/Gregg Turner)
2. "The Todd Killings" – 0:38 (Saunders/Turner)
3. "Lights Out" – 0:52 (Saunders/Turner)
4. "My Old Man's a Fatso" – 1:32 (Saunders)
5. "Time Has Come Today" – 2:07 (Joseph Chambers/Willie Chambers)
6. "They Saved Hitler's Cock" – 1:40 (Jeff Dahl/Todd Homer/Turner)
7. "Homo-Sexual" – 0:52 (J. Falwell)
8. "Steak Knife" – 1:00 (Saunders/Turner)
9. "Haizman's Brain Is Calling" – 1:56 (Saunders/Turner)
10. "Tuna Taco" – 0:38 (Homer)
11. "Coffin Case" – 0:39 (Saunders)
12. "You Stupid Jerk" – 0:23 (Saunders)
13. "Ballad of Jerry Curlan" – 3:08 (P.J. Galligan/Turner/Bill Vockeroth)
14. "Not of This Earth" – 1:11 (Saunders/Turner)

== Personnel ==
- "Metal Mike" Saunders - vocals, guitar
- Gregg Turner - vocals, guitar
- P.J. Galligan - guitar
- Todd Homer - bass guitar, vocals
- Bill Vockeroth - drums
- Ronn Spencer - album design
