= Beyond the Sun (album) =

Studio album by Chris Isaak
- Released: October 18, 2011
- Recorded: 2009–2011
- Studios: Sun Studio, Memphis, Tennessee
- Genre: Rockabilly
- Length: 35:33
- Label: Vanguard
- Producer: Chris Isaak

Chris Isaak chronology
Mr. Lucky (2009)	Beyond the Sun (2011)	First Comes the Night (2015)

Professional ratings
Aggregate scores
Source	Rating
Metacritic	74/100
Review scores
Source	Rating
AllMusic	3.5/5 stars
The Daily Telegraph	4/5 stars
The Guardian	3/5 stars
PopMatters	8/10 stars

Beyond the Sun is the eleventh studio album by Chris Isaak, released through Vanguard Records on October 18, 2011. It is a collection of songs recorded by Sun Records artists Elvis Presley, Johnny Cash, Roy Orbison, Carl Perkins and Jerry Lee Lewis. Some of the songs were originally released on Sun Records. The record itself was recorded at Sun Studio, Memphis, Tennessee and the cover photograph was taken by Sheryl Louis outside the studio on Union Avenue.

The album debuted at No. 34 on the Billboard 200 albums chart on its first week of release, selling around 10,000 copies in the United States. It also debuted at No. 10 on the Top Rock Albums charts, peaking at No. 8 the following week. As of October 2015, the album has sold 91,000 copies in the US.

== Track listing ==
1. "Ring of Fire" (June Carter Cash, Merle Kilgore) (Johnny Cash, 1963)
2. "Trying to Get to You" (Charles Singleton, Rose Marie McCoy) (Elvis Presley, 1955)
3. "I Forgot to Remember to Forget" (Charlie Feathers, Stan Kesler) (Elvis Presley, 1955)
4. "Great Balls of Fire" (Jack Hammer, Otis Blackwell) (Jerry Lee Lewis, 1957)
5. "Can't Help Falling in Love" (George David Weiss, Hugo Peretti, Luigi Creatore) (Elvis Presley, 1961)
6. "Dixie Fried" (Carl Perkins, Howard Griffin) (Carl Perkins, 1956)
7. "How's the World Treating You" (Boudleaux Bryant, Chet Atkins) (Elvis Presley, 1956)
8. "It's Now or Never" (Aaron Schroeder, Eduardo di Capua, Wally Gold) (Elvis Presley, 1960)
9. "Miss Pearl" (Jimmy Wages) (Jimmy Wages, 1957)
10. "Live It Up" (Chris Isaak) (Chris Isaak original)
11. "I Walk the Line" (Johnny Cash) (Johnny Cash, 1956)
12. "So Long I'm Gone" (Sam Phillips) (Warren Smith, 1957)
13. "She's Not You" (Doc Pomus, Jerry Leiber, Mike Stoller) (Elvis Presley, 1962)
14. "My Happiness" (Betty Peterson, Borney Bergantine) (Elvis Presley, 1953)

Deluxe edition bonus disc

1. "My Baby Left Me" (Arthur Crudup, 1950)
2. "Oh, Pretty Woman" (Roy Orbison, 1964)
3. "Doin' the Best I Can" (Elvis Presley, 1960)
4. "Your True Love" (Carl Perkins, 1957)
5. "Crazy Arms" (Jerry Lee Lewis, 1958)
6. "Lovely Loretta" (Chris Isaak original)
7. "Everybody's in the Mood" (Howlin' Wolf, 1952)
8. "I'm Gonna Sit Right Down and Cry (Over You)" (Elvis Presley, 1956)
9. "Love Me" (Elvis Presley, 1956)
10. "Doncha' Think It's Time" (Elvis Presley, 1958)
11. "That Lucky Old Sun" (Jerry Lee Lewis, 1956)

Australian Collector's Edition

The single-disc Australian Collector's Edition of the album includes all 25 tracks from the US / UK 2-disc Deluxe Edition plus the following three tracks:

26. "Great Balls of Fire" (Westlake Mix 1)
27. "My Baby Don't Love Me No More" (Chris Isaak original)
28. "Bonnie B"

== Personnel ==
- Chris Isaak – vocals, rhythm guitar
- Hershel Yatovitz – guitar, vocals
- Rowland Salley – bass, vocals
- Scott Plunkett – keyboards
- Kenney Dale Johnson – drums, vocals
- Rafael Padilla – percussion

with:

- David Woodford, Cowboy Jack Clement, Lee Thornburg, Waddy Wachtel – additional musicians
- Ashley Monroe, Craig Copeland, Jon Joyce, Michelle Branch, Richard Wells – additional vocals

== Charts ==
=== Weekly charts ===
Weekly chart performance
Chart (2011–2012)	Peak position
Australian Albums (ARIA)	3
Belgian Albums (Ultratop Flanders)	95
Belgian Albums (Ultratop Wallonia)	28
Canadian Albums (Nielsen SoundScan)	30
Dutch Albums (Album Top 100)	69
French Albums (SNEP)	38
New Zealand Albums (RMNZ)	23
Scottish Albums (Official Charts)	4
Spanish Albums (Promusicae)	55
Swedish Albums (Sverigetopplistan)	40
Swiss Albums (Schweizer Hitparade)	89
UK Albums (Official Charts)	6
US Billboard 200	34
US Independent Albums (Billboard)	9
US Indie Store Album Sales (Billboard)	6
US Top Rock Albums (Billboard)	8

=== Year-end charts ===
Year-end chart performance
Chart (2011)	Position
Australian Albums (ARIA)	40

== Certifications ==
Certifications
Region	Certification	Certified units/sales
Australia (ARIA)	Gold	35,000^{^}
United Kingdom (BPI)	Silver	60,000^{^}
^{^} Shipments figures based on certification alone.
