= Silvertone (album) =

Studio album by Chris Isaak
- Released: January 10, 1985
- Recorded: 1982–1984
- Genre: Rockabilly
- Length: 39:15
- Label: Warner Bros.
- Producer: Erik Jacobsen

Chris Isaak chronology
Silvertone (1985)	Chris Isaak (1987)

Professional ratings
Review scores
Source	Rating
AllMusic	4.5/5 stars
The Rolling Stone Album Guide	3/5 stars
Select	4/5
The Village Voice	B

Silvertone is the debut album by American musician Chris Isaak, released in 1985. It was named after the band that Isaak co-founded and led, though only guitarist James Calvin Wilsey is credited on the album. The album sold poorly in the US but became a minor hit in Australia, peaking at #77 in June 1986.

== Background and recording ==
The band Silvertone consisted of Isaak (lead vocals, rhythm guitar), James Wilsey (lead guitar, backing vocals), Jamie Ayers (upright bass) and John Silvers (drums) from 1980 to 1982. The band became involved with veteran producer Erik Jacobsen within a year of forming and signed with his production company. Jacobsen interested Warner Bros. Records in signing the band, and the label allotted them a small budget to record demos; however, neither Warner Bros. nor the band members were happy with the recordings.

Dissatisfied with his rhythm section, Isaak fired Silvers in 1982 and then Ayers a year later, with Isaak and Wilsey continuing work with session drummers Prairie Prince and Jim Keltner and bassist Chris Solberg. Recording for the album began in earnest in 1983, with Jacobsen financing the sessions himself, and concluded in 1984. Ayers later claimed that his bass parts on two tracks remained on the final album, uncredited; Jacobsen commented that this is possible, but could not remember for certain.

== Release ==
Though Isaak and his band had been billed collectively as Silvertone for years, with Isaak and Wilsey considered equal creative partners, Jacobsen envisioned Isaak as a solo star, and the recording and publishing contracts Isaak signed positioned him as the sole bandleader business-wise. Additionally, the band was persuaded by Warner Bros. to downplay the name Silvertone to avoid a lawsuit from Sears, of whom Silvertone was a trademarked brand name for consumer electronics and musical instruments.

Warner Bros. released Silvertone in January 1985. The cover photograph was conceived by Isaak as an homage to Elvis Presley's 1958 single sleeve for "Don't". Isaak promoted the release with multi-week residencies at the Nightbreak club in San Francisco and the Anti-Club in Los Angeles, followed by a club tour of North America and Europe. For the tour, Isaak and Wilsey recruited bassist Rowland Salley and drummer Kenney Dale Johnson, who would remain permanent members. Despite the album receiving positive reviews and endorsements from established artists such as John Fogerty, Silvertone was a commercial flop in the United States, selling approximately 14,000 copies. By 2006, it had sold 147,000 copies.

== Tracks in popular culture ==
The album was not a hit until the song "Gone Ridin'" was featured in the 1986 David Lynch film Blue Velvet, the first of many Isaak/Lynch collaborations, though the song had previously appeared on the soundtrack to the film American Flyers the year before. "Livin’ for Your Lover" is also featured in the former. "Dancin'" appeared in the film Modern Girls released the same year, but wasn't included on the soundtrack. It also appeared in the season 2 episode of Miami Vice 'Payback'. "Gone Ridin'" was used in the 1987 comedy Morgan Stewart's Coming Home. Two songs from this album were played on the Fox's long running teen drama Beverly Hills, 90210 including "Gone Ridin'", which was played in the Season 2 episode "Pass, Not Pass"; and "Dancin'" which was played in the Season 3 episode "Castles in the Sand". Several songs from the album appeared in Episodes 5 and 6 of Private Eye TV series (1987) starring Josh Brolin, including "Gone Ridin'" and "Funeral in the Rain".

The song "Western Stars" was covered by K.d. lang as the opening track on the album Shadowland.

== Track listing ==
All songs written by Chris Isaak.

1. "Dancin'" – 3:44
2. "Talk to Me" – 3:04
3. "Livin' for Your Lover" – 2:56
4. "Back on Your Side" – 3:14
5. "Voodoo" – 2:44
6. "Funeral in the Rain" – 3:18
7. "The Lonely Ones" – 3:12
8. "Unhappiness" – 3:10
9. "Tears" – 2:44
10. "Gone Ridin'" – 2:36
11. "Pretty Girls Don't Cry" – 2:24
12. "Western Stars" – 3:12
13. "Another Idea" – 2:53 (U.S. edition only)

== Personnel ==
Musicians

- Chris Isaak – vocals, guitar
- James Calvin Wilsey – lead guitar, lap steel guitar
- Prairie Prince – drums
- Chris Solberg – bass
- Pee Wee Ellis – saxophone
- Jim Keltner – drums on "Livin' for Your Lover"
- Pat Craig – organ

Production

- Produced by Erik Jacobsen
- Engineered by Tom Mallon, Mark Needham, Lee Herschberg, Dave Carlson, Pat Craig
- Michael Zagaris – inner booklet photography
- Rick Lopez – front cover photography

== Charts ==
Chart (1986)	Peak position
Australia (Kent Music Report)	77

== Certifications ==
Region	Certification	Certified units/sales
United States	—	147,000
