= Inside My Brain =

EP by Angry Samoans
- Released: October 16, 1980
- Genre: Punk rock
- Length: 9:39
- Label: Bad Trip Records
- Producer: Lee Ving

Angry Samoans chronology
Inside My Brain (1980)	Back from Samoa (1982)

Professional ratings
Review scores
Source	Rating
AllMusic	link
Christgau's Record Guide	A

Inside My Brain is the debut extended play by the American punk rock band Angry Samoans, released in 1980 by Bad Trip Records. The most infamous song on the EP, "Get Off the Air", was directed at influential KROQ-FM DJ Rodney Bingenheimer.

== Track listing ==
1. "Right Side of My Mind" - 2:09
2. "Gimme Sopor" - 1:44
3. "Hot Cars" - 0:33
4. "Inside My Brain" - 1:36
5. "You Stupid Asshole" - 2:09
6. "Get Off the Air" - 1:28

=== Reissue on PVC Records and Triple X Records ===
1. "Right Side of My Mind" - 2:09
2. "Gimme Sopor" - 1:44
3. "Hot Cars" - 0:33
4. "Inside My Brain" - 1:36
5. "You Stupid Asshole" - 2:09
6. "Get Off the Air" - 1:28
7. "My Old Man's a Fatso" (demo, recorded October 1978) - 2:55
8. "Carson Girls" (demo, recorded October 1978) - 2:48
9. "I'm a Pig" (demo, recorded October 1978) - 2:17
10. "Too Animalistic" (live at Rhino Records, May 12, 1979) - 1:59
11. "Right Side of My Mind" (live at Rhino Records, May 12, 1979) - 2:16

== Personnel ==
- "Metal Mike" Saunders - vocals, guitar
- Gregg Turner - vocals, guitar (tracks 1–6)
- P.J. Galligan - first guitar (tracks 1–6)
- Bonze Blayk f/k/a "Kevin Saunders" – lead guitar (tracks 7–11)
- Todd Homer - bass guitar, vocals
- Bill Vockeroth - drums
