= Live at Winterland 1978 (Avengers album) =

Live album by Avengers
- Released: February 16, 2010
- Recorded: January 14, 1978
- Venue: Winterland Ballroom
- Genre: Punk rock
- Length: 33:27
- Label: CD Presents

Avengers chronology
The American in Me (2004)	Live at Winterland 1978 (2010)

Live at Winterland 1978 is a live album by the Avengers. It was released through online music stores on February 16, 2010. The album features a recording of their set on January 14, 1978 at the Winterland Ballroom in San Francisco, CA, when they opened for the Sex Pistols on what would become the Sex Pistols final show, before reuniting years later. The Sex Pistols' set has been released on an album of the same name. Songs from this album were previously released on a couple 7" bootlegs titled Penelope and Summer of Hate.

== Track listing ==
1. "The Amerikan in Me" – 2:07
2. "Desperation" – 2:07
3. "Paint It Black" – 2:57
4. "Friends of Mine" – 2:20
5. "Open Your Eyes" – 2:03
6. "No Martyr" – 2:36
7. "Teenage Rebel" – 2:34
8. "Crazy Homicide" – 2:11
9. "The End of the World" – 2:58
10. "Summer of Hate" – 1:52
11. "We Are the One" – 2:22
12. "I Believe in Me" – 2:50
13. "Car Crash" – 4:30

== Personnel ==
- Penelope Houston – vocals
- Greg Ingraham – guitar
- Danny Furious – drums
- Jimmy Wilsey – bass
