= Chris Isaak (album) =

Studio album by Chris Isaak
- Released: March 10, 1987
- Recorded: 1986
- Genres: Rock and roll; rockabilly
- Length: 36:05
- Label: Warner Bros.
- Producer: Erik Jacobsen

Chris Isaak chronology
Silvertone (1985)	Chris Isaak (1987)	Heart Shaped World (1989)

Singles from Chris Isaak
- 1. "You Owe Me Some Kind of Love" Released: 1987; 2. "Blue Hotel" Released: 1987; 3. "Lie to Me" Released: 1987; 4. "Heart Full of Soul" Released: 1987

Professional ratings
Review scores
Source	Rating
AllMusic	3/5 stars
The Rolling Stone Album Guide	3/5 stars
Select	4/5
The Village Voice	B

Chris Isaak is the second album by Chris Isaak, released in 1987. After the poor commercial performance of his debut, Isaak honed his style to a sophisticated R&B for his follow-up. It was the first album to feature his entire backing band, composed of guitarist James Calvin Wilsey, bassist Rowland Salley and drummer Kenny Dale Johnson.

The song "Blue Hotel" was a hit in France, and in the U.K. after being re-released in 1991 making the Top 20.

== Tracks in Popular Culture ==
Several songs from the album appeared in Episodes 6 and 7 of Private Eye TV series (1987) starring Josh Brolin, including "You Owe Me Some Kind of Love", "Blue Hotel", "Lie to Me" and "Wild Love”.

== Track listing ==
All tracks composed by Chris Isaak; except where indicated

1. "You Owe Me Some Kind of Love" – 3:51
2. "Heart Full of Soul" (Graham Gouldman) – 3:20
3. "Blue Hotel" – 3:10
4. "Lie to Me" – 4:12
5. "Fade Away" – 4:15
6. "Wild Love" – 2:57
7. "This Love Will Last" – 2:45
8. "You Took My Heart" – 2:31
9. "Cryin'" – 2:30
10. "Lovers Game" – 2:55
11. "Waiting for the Rain to Fall" – 3:39

== Personnel ==
Adapted from album liner notes

- Chris Isaak – guitar, vocals
- James Calvin Wilsey – lead guitar
- Kenney Dale Johnson – drums, vocals
- Rowland Salley – bass
- Prairie Prince – drums
- Chris Solberg – bass
- John Robinson – drums
- Pat Craig – keyboards

Technical

- Dave Carlson – recording engineer
- Kim Champagne – art direction, design
- Pamela Gentile – photography
- Aaron Gregory – crew
- Jeri McManus Heiden – art direction, design
- Lee Herschberg – mixing
- Erik Jacobsen – producer
- Tom Mallon – recording engineer
- Tim Ryan – crew tour manager
- Bruce Weber – front cover photography
- Mike Zagaris – photography

== Charts ==
Chart (1986/1999)	Peak position
Australian Albums (ARIA Charts)	148

== Sales and certifications ==
Region	Certification	Certified units/sales
Australia (ARIA)	Gold	35,000^{^}
France (SNEP)	Platinum	300,000^{*}
Spain (Promusicae)	Gold	50,000^{^}
United States	—	393,000
^{*} Sales figures based on certification alone.^{^} Shipments figures based on certification alone.
