= Died for Your Sins =

Compilation album by Avengers
- Released: February 23, 1999
- Recorded: 1977–78, 1998
- Genre: Punk rock
- Length: 47:19
- Label: Lookout Records
- Producer: Penelope Houston and Kevin Army

Avengers chronology
Avengers (1983)	Died for Your Sins (1999)	Zero Hour (2003)

Died for Your Sins is a compilation album by the Avengers. It was released on February 23, 1999, on Lookout Records. The album is composed of four studio recordings from 1978 (two of which were previously released on a 7" single in Sweden in 1995), three studio recordings from 1998 recorded by The Scavengers (a band made up of two original Avengers with two new members) and fourteen live tracks recorded in 1977 and 1978. Two of the songs on the album are covers: "Joker's Wild", originally by The Ventures, and "Money", originally by Barrett Strong.

== Track listing ==
All songs written by Houston/Ingraham/O'Brien/Wilsey except where noted

1. "Teenage Rebel"
2. "Friends of Mine"
3. "White Nigger"
4. "Good the Bad and the Kowalskis"
5. "I Want In"
6. "Crazy Homicide"
7. "The End of the World"
8. "('Fools or Hippies' Spoken Intro)" (live)
9. "The American in Me" (live)
10. "('Get Up!' Spoken Intro)" (live)
11. "Open Your Eyes" (live)
12. "Car Crash" (live)
13. "Tiny Pink Noise" (live)
14. "Fuck You" (live)
15. "Joker's Wild" (live) (Bogle/Edwards/Taylor/Wilson)
16. "Something's Wrong" (live)
17. "('Wrong Town' Spoken Intro)" (live)
18. "Desperation" (live)
19. "I Believe in Me" (live)
20. "Money" (live) (Gordy/Bradford)
21. "We Are the One" (live)

=== Track origins ===
- Tracks 1, 2 and 4 were recorded during a rehearsal at the Iguana Studios in 1978.
- Track 3 was recorded as a demo at Wally Heider Studios in 1978.
- Tracks 5–7 were recorded at The Roof Brothers Studio in 1998.
- Tracks 8–12 were recorded live at Mabuhay Gardens in 1978
- Tracks 13 and 14 were recorded live at The Keystone in 1977
- Tracks 15–18 were recorded live in Santa Cruz in 1978
- Track 19 were recorded live at The Keystone in 1977
- Tracks 20 and 21 were recorded live at The Whiskey A-Go-Go in 1978

== Personnel ==
- Penelope Houston – vocals
- Greg Ingraham – guitar
- Danny Furious – drums on tracks 1–4 and 8–21
- Jimmy Wilsey – bass on tracks 1–4 and 8–21
- Joel Reader – bass on tracks 5–7
- Danny Panic – drums on tracks 5–7
