= The American in Me =

The American in Me may refer to:

- The American in Me (Avengers album), 2004
- The American in Me (Steve Forbert album), 1992
