= Yesterday Started Tomorrow =

EP by Angry Samoans
- Released: 1986
- Genre: Garage punk
- Length: 12:25
- Label: Triple X Records
- Producer: Bill Inglot

Angry Samoans chronology
Back from Samoa (1982)	Yesterday Started Tomorrow (1986)	STP Not LSD (1988)

Professional ratings
Review scores
Source	Rating
Allmusic	2.5/5 stars
Christgau's Record Guide	B+

Yesterday Started Tomorrow is an EP by the American punk rock band Angry Samoans, released in 1986. The EP featured a major style change, contrasting with their first two albums.

== Cover art ==
The album’s front sports a photo of guitarist-vocalist “Metal” Mike Saunders wearing a T-shirt featuring the cover art from The MC5’s 1970 album, Back in the USA.

== Track listing ==
All songs by Angry Samoans unless noted.

1. "Different World" – 1:47
2. "Electrocution" – 2:10
3. "It's Raining Today" – 2:43
4. "Unhinged" – 1:55
5. "Psych-Out 129" – 1:54
6. "Somebody to Love" – 1:56 (Darby Slick)

== Personnel ==
- "Metal" Mike Saunders – vocals, guitar, beats
- Gregg Turner – vocals, guitar, acoustic guitar, jug
- Todd Homer – bass, vocals, photography
- Steve Drojensky – guitar
- Larry Robinson – guitar
- Bill Vockeroth – drums
- Bill Inglot – producer, engineer
- John Strother – engineer
