= Avengers (album) =

Compilation album by Avengers
- Released: October 10, 1983
- Recorded: 1977–79
- Genre: Punk rock
- Label: CD Presents

Avengers chronology
Avengers (1979)	Avengers (1983)	Died for Your Sins (1999)

Professional ratings
Review scores
Source	Rating
Christgau's Record Guide	B

Avengers is a compilation album by the American punk group Avengers. It was released on vinyl in 1983 by CD Presents. It is the closest thing to a studio album the band has, although it was compiled by drummer Danny Furious from various recordings the band did in their three years of existence.

The album includes some songs previously released, including all of the songs from the We Are the One EP, two songs from the Avengers EP (as well as other songs recorded during the EP's sessions) and both songs from the "Paint it Black" single.

== Re-releases ==
The album has been re-released multiple times over the years. The first re-release came when the album was first released on cassette by CD Presents with two more tracks; the 1989 release on CD included the same bonus tracks. In 2000, Lady Butcher released the album on CD with 10 bonus tracks that were recorded live at the Whisky a Go Go in Los Angeles, California, in August 1978. Sometime by 2003, singer Penelope Houston was selling CD-R copies of the album on her website. In 2010, CD Presents re-released the album through online music stores such as iTunes Store and Amazon MP3 and on CD only through Amazon.com featuring four alternate takes although this release appears to have been pulled due to a rights issues from Penelope Houston. In 2012 Water Music Records re-released the compilation as a 2-CD set, with the first CD containing the 14 tracks of the original vinyl release, and the second CD containing additional demo and live recordings of the era.

== Track listing ==
=== Vinyl (1983) ===
==== Side One ====
1. "We Are the One"
2. "Car Crash"
3. "I Believe in Me"
4. "Open Your Eyes"
5. "No Martyr"
6. "Desperation"
7. "Thin White Line"

==== Side Two ====
1. "Paint it Black" (Mick Jagger, Keith Richards)
2. "The Amerikan in Me"
3. "White Nigger"
4. "Uh Oh"
5. "Second to None"
6. "Corpus Christie"
7. "Fuck You" (live)

=== CD (1989) ===
1. "We Are the One"
2. "Car Crash"
3. "I Believe in Me"
4. "Open Your Eyes"
5. "No Martyr"
6. "Desperation"
7. "Thin White Line"
8. "Money, Money"
9. "Paint it Black"
10. "The Amerikan in Me"
11. "White Nigger"
12. "Uh Oh"
13. "Second to None"
14. "Cheap Tragedies"
15. "Corpus Christie"
16. "Fuck You" (live)

=== CD (2000) ===
1. "We Are the One" – 2:40
2. "Car Crash" – 4:20
3. "I Believe in Me" – 2:54
4. "Open Your Eyes" – 2:40
5. "No Martyr" – 3:04
6. "Desperation" – 2:33
7. "Thin White Line" – 3:12
8. "Money Money" – 2:25
9. "Paint It Black" – 3:17
10. "The American in Me" – 2:09
11. "White Nigger" – 3:37
12. "Uh-Oh" – 3:07
13. "Second to None" – 2:29
14. "Cheap Tragedies" – 3:05
15. "Corpus Christi" – 3:27
16. "Fuck You (live)" – 2:37
17. "The American in Me (live)" – 1:51
18. "White Nigger (live)" – 2:55
19. "Don't You (live)" – 2:58
20. "Open Your Eyes (live)" – 2:25
21. "C'Mon Everybody (live)" – 1:45
22. "Kingdom (live)" – 3:30
23. "We are the One (live)" – 2:19
24. "Thin White Line (live)" – 2:41
25. "No Martyr (live)" – 2:44
26. "I Believe in Me (live)" – 3:12

=== CD/digital (2010) ===
1. "We Are the One" – 2:40
2. "Car Crash" – 4:20
3. "I Believe in Me" – 2:53
4. "Open Your Eyes" – 2:40
5. "No Martyr" – 3:01
6. "Desperation" – 2:29
7. "Thin White Line" – 3:14
8. "Paint it Black" – 3:15
9. "The Amerikan in Me" – 2:05
10. "White Nigger" – 3:34
11. "Uh Oh" – 3:04
12. "Second to None" – 2:27
13. "Corpus Christi" – 3:31
14. "Fuck You" (live) – 2:42
15. "Cheap Tragedies" – 3:04
16. "No Martyr" (alternate take) – 3:01
17. "Thin White Line" (alternate take) – 2:53
18. "Desperation" (alternate take) – 2:11
19. "Corpus Christi" (alternate take) – 3:21

=== 2CD/digital (2012) ===
==== DISC 1 ====
1. "We Are the One" – 2:40
2. "Car Crash" – 4:20
3. "I Believe in Me" – 2:53
4. "Open Your Eyes" – 2:40
5. "No Martyr" – 3:01
6. "Desperation" – 2:29
7. "Thin White Line" – 3:14
8. "Paint it Black" – 3:15
9. "The Amerikan in Me" – 2:05
10. "White Nigger" – 3:34
11. "Uh Oh" – 3:04
12. "Second to None" – 2:27
13. "Corpus Christi" – 3:31
14. "Fuck You" (live) – 2:42

==== DISC 2 ====
1. "Teenage Rebel" (1977 Iguana rehearsal studio recording) – 1:55
2. "Friends of Mine" (1977 Iguana rehearsal studio recording) – 2:14
3. "White Nigger" (early version demoed at Wally Heider Studios in 1978) – 3:26
4. "Cheap Tragedies" (recorded on May 13, 1979, at Peter Miller Studios) – 3:04
5. "The Good, the Bad, and the Kowalskis" (1977 Iguana rehearsal studio recording) – 5:04
6. "Crazy Homicide" (Live January 14, 1978, at the Winterland Ballroom) – 2:05
7. "Summer of Hate" (Live January 14, 1978, at the Winterland Ballroom) – 2:24
8. "I Believe in Me" (Live January 14, 1978, at the Winterland Ballroom) – 3:17
9. "Your Parents Sins" (Live January 20, 1978, at the Mabuhay Gardens for the Miner's Benefit) – 3:04
10. "Something's Wrong" (Live August 12, 1978, at the Steamship in Santa Cruz) – 2:42
11. "Money Money" (1977 Iguana rehearsal studio recording) – 2:22
12. "Misery" (Live June 13, 1979, at the Old Waldorf) – 2:58
13. "Time To Die" (Live June 13, 1979, at the Old Waldorf) – 5:12
14. "Release Me" (Live June 13, 1979, at the Old Waldorf) – 4:24
15. "Zero Hour" (Live June 13, 1979, at the Old Waldorf) – 3:38
16. "The American in Me" (recorded on October 12, 1978, at Different Fur, and originally released in 1979 on White Noise) – 2:15
17. "Uh-Oh" (recorded on October 12, 1978, at Different Fur, and originally released in 1979 on White Noise) – 3:07

== Personnel ==
- Penelope Houston – vocals
- Greg Ingraham – guitar
- Brad Kunt – guitar on "Corpus Christi"
- Danny Furious – drums
- Jimmy Wilsey – bass
