= The American in Me (Avengers album) =

Compilation album by Avengers
- Released: April 20, 2004
- Recorded: 1978–79
- Genre: Punk rock
- Length: 39:22
- Label: DBK Works

Avengers chronology
Zero Hour (2003)	The American in Me (2004)	Live at Winterland 1978 (2010)

The American in Me is a compilation album by the Avengers. It was released on April 20, 2004, on DBK Works. The album is composed of four studio recordings from 1978 and a live concert recorded at the Old Waldorf in San Francisco, CA on June 13, 1979. The concert was previously released on Zero Hour one year earlier.

PopMatters noted, "This release collects unearthed studio work, including alternate takes of the Steve Jones sessions, and a crystal clear live show at the Old Waldorf in ’79, when the band were three shows away from their end."

== Track listing ==
1. "We Are the One" – 2:39
2. "The American in Me" – 2:07
3. "White Nigger" – 3:29
4. "Uh-Oh" – 3:07
5. "Cheap Tragedies" – 3:30
6. "Zero Hour" – 3:23
7. "Corpus Christi" – 3:04
8. "Release Me" – 4:33
9. "Uh-Oh" – 3:23
10. "Misery (Finger on the Trigger)" – 3:05
11. "Time To Die" – 5:05
12. "The American In Me" – 2:10

== Personnel ==
- Penelope Houston – vocals
- Greg Ingraham – guitar on tracks 1–4
- Brad Kent – guitar on tracks 5–12
- Danny Furious – drums
- Jimmy Wilsey – bass
