= We Are the One =

EP by Avengers
- Released: 1977
- Recorded: October 1977
- Studio: Kitchen Sink
- Genre: Punk rock
- Length: 9:43
- Label: Dangerhouse
- Producer: Rand McNally

Avengers EP chronology
We Are the One (1977)	Avengers (1979)

Audio sample
- file; help

We Are the One is the first EP by the Avengers. It was released on Dangerhouse Records in 1977. It is sometimes known as the Dangerhouse EP, referring to the label that released it. It was recorded in October 1977 at Kitchen Sink Studio.

The release had two different covers, with the first pressing having the "crucifixion" cover, while later pressings had the "target" cover. All of its songs are on the 1983 album Avengers. The single was re-released on Frontier Records. The single was also included on Dangerhouse Volume One.

The EP marked the first time that a West Coast punk band had issued music on an independent label.

== Critical reception ==
The Rough Guide to Rock called the songs "defiant anthems of self-realization." Robert Christgau considered "We Are the One" to be the "finest U.S. indie single of 1977." Trouser Press wrote that "the Avengers’ original EP was a minor classic of its time, indicating that they might have become America’s best straight-ahead punk (not hardcore) band had they lasted."

== Track listing ==
=== Side A ===
1. "We Are the One" – 2:36
2. "I Believe in Me" – 2:52

=== Side B ===
1. "Car Crash" – 4:15

== Personnel ==
- Penelope Houston – vocals
- Greg Ingraham – guitar
- Danny Furious – drums
- Jimmy Wilsey – bass guitar
