= First Comes the Night =

Studio album by Chris Isaak
- Released: October 23, 2015
- Recorded: 2014–2015
- Genres: Rock and roll; country
- Length: 41:37
- Label: Vanguard Records VAN-38119-02
- Producers: Chris Isaak, Dave Cobb, Mark Needham, Paul Worley

Chris Isaak chronology
Beyond the Sun (2011)	First Comes the Night (2015)

Professional ratings
Aggregate scores
Source	Rating
Metacritic	71/100
Review scores
Source	Rating
AllMusic	4/5 stars
Rolling Stone	3/5 stars
American Songwriter	3.5/5 stars
Renowned for Sound	4/5 stars
The Absolute Sound	3.5/5 stars
Stuff.co.nz	3.5/5 stars
The National	3/5 stars
laut.de	4/5 stars

First Comes the Night is the twelfth studio album by American musician Chris Isaak, released through Vanguard Records in Australia on October 23, 2015 and worldwide on November 13, 2015.

== Track listing ==
No.	Title	Writer(s)	Length
1.	"First Comes the Night"	Chris Isaak, Scott Plunkett, Rowland Salley	4:18
2.	"Please Don't Call"	Natalie Hemby, Chris Isaak	5:18
3.	"Perfect Lover"	Chris Isaak	3:33
4.	"Down in Flames"	Chris Isaak, Gordie Sampson, Caitlyn Smith	2:54
5.	"Reverie"	Michelle Branch, Natalie Hemby, Chris Isaak	3:56
6.	"Baby, What You Want Me to Do?"	Chris Isaak	3:00
7.	"Kiss Me Like a Stranger"	Chris Isaak, James Slater	3:22
8.	"Dry Your Eyes"	Chris Isaak	4:32
9.	"Don't Break My Heart"	Chris Isaak	2:33
10.	"Running Down the Road"	Chris Isaak	2:40
11.	"Insects"	Chris Isaak	2:53
12.	"The Way Things Really Are"	Chris Isaak	2:38
13.	"Some Days Are Harder Than the Rest" (Deluxe Edition)	Chris Isaak	4:04
14.	"Keep Hanging On" (Deluxe Edition)	Chris Isaak	2:21
15.	"Every Night I Miss You More" (Deluxe Edition)	Chris Isaak	1:48
16.	"The Girl That Broke My Heart" (Deluxe Edition)	Chris Isaak	2:59
17.	"Love the Way You Kiss Me" (Deluxe Edition)	Chris Isaak	2:15
Total length:			41:37

== Personnel ==
- Chris Isaak – lead vocals, guitar
- Kenney Dale Johnson – drums, vocals
- Rowland Salley – bass, vocals
- Hershel Yatovitz – guitar
- Scott Plunkett – keyboards, piano, organ
- Rafael Padilla – percussion

Technical

- Chris Isaak, Dave Cobb, Mark Needham, Paul Worley – production

== Charts ==
Chart (2015–16)	Peak position
Australian Albums (ARIA)	2
Belgian Albums (Ultratop Flanders)	35
Belgian Albums (Ultratop Wallonia)	63
French Albums (SNEP)	186
Spanish Albums (Promusicae)	84
UK Albums (Official Charts)	32
UK Country Albums (Official Charts)	1
US Billboard 200	66
