= Avengers (band) =

American punk rock band

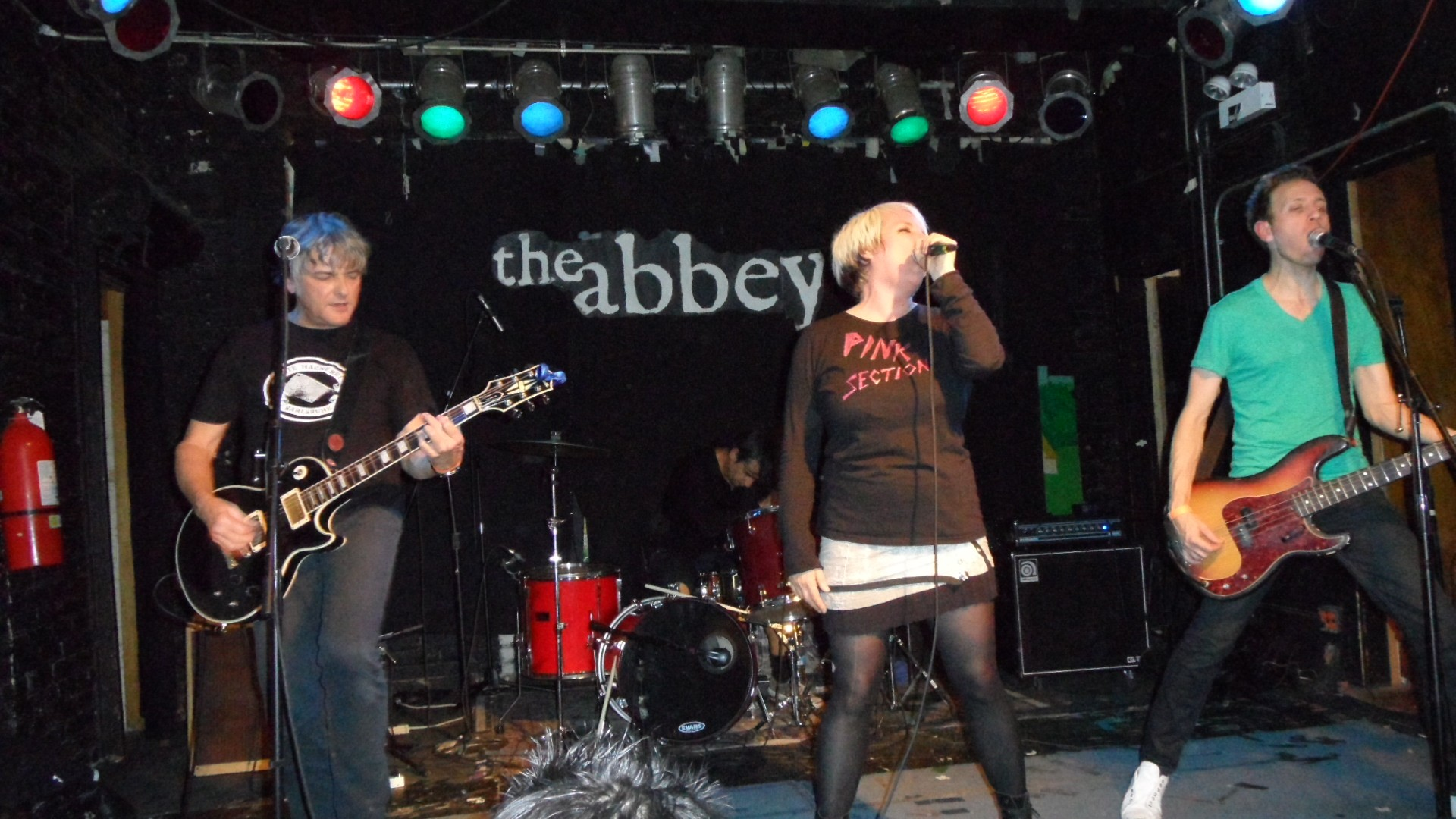
- Avengers in 2012

Background information
- Also known as: scAvengers
- Origin: San Francisco, California, United States
- Genres: Punk rock, hardcore punk
- Years active: 1977–1979, 1999, 2004–present
- Labels: Dangerhouse, White Noise, CD Presents, Lookout
- Members: Penelope Houston; Greg Ingraham; Joel Reader; Luis Illades
- Past members: Danny Furious (Danny O'Brien); Jonathan Postal; James Wilsey (deceased); Brad Kent (deceased); Danny Panic

The Avengers are an American punk rock band formed in 1977 in San Francisco. The band recorded an EP, We Are the One (1977) and, after opening for the Sex Pistols, worked with Steve Jones, but had not released an album before breaking up in 1979. After the breakup an EP with the Steve Jones-produced songs was released (The Avengers), and later an album, Avengers, in 1983. Their lead singer, Penelope Houston, is also a folk singer who has a solo career. Since 1999 a number of other albums were released with studio and live tracks, and the band has come together for various occasions.

== History ==
=== Early history ===
Drummer Danny Furious (Danny O'Brien) and guitarist Greg Ingraham decided to start a band, and Furious approached Penelope Houston to be their singer, who agreed. They finished their lineup with Jonathon Postal on bass, although he was replaced shortly after by Jimmy Wilsey. Their first release (and only release while the band was originally together) was We Are the One, a three-song EP which was released on Dangerhouse Records in 1977.

The Avengers opened for the Sex Pistols in San Francisco at their final show at Winterland, which led to Sex Pistols guitarist Steve Jones producing a recording session for the band. In January 1979, Ingraham left the band and was replaced by Brad Kent, although the band only lasted a few more months until June 1979. An EP, titled Avengers, was released on White Noise Records a few months after the band broke up, which included songs from the Steve Jones produced session. Houston went on to record as a solo artist.

An album called Avengers (sometimes referred to as the Pink Album, including by Houston herself) was released in 1983. It featured tracks recorded through the band's whole time together, and was compiled by drummer Danny Furious. The album was out-of-print for a long time due to being in "legal limbo", during which time Houston sold the album in CD-R format directly through her website. The album was re-released in 2010.

=== New releases and re-formation ===
In 1999, a compilation album called Died for Your Sins was issued by Lookout! Records. In addition to original unreleased studio recordings and live tracks, three tracks were newly recorded in 1999 by the scAvengers, featuring original members Houston and Ingraham with new members bassist Joel Reader (The Mr. T Experience, The Plus Ones) and drummer Danny Panic (Screeching Weasel). To support the album, the scAvengers did a few shows. In 2003, a live album titled Zero Hour was released in Italy. The next year, The American in Me was released, featuring all of the tracks from Zero Hour plus four other unreleased studio recordings. Houston and Ingraham again joined with Reader and new drummer Luis Illades to perform some record release shows, and this lineup has performed sporadic live shows since.

On July 16, 2006, Houston and Ingraham joined Pearl Jam to perform "American in Me" at the Bill Graham Civic Center. By January 2017, they were recording in Berkeley with Robert Shimp.

== Reception ==
- " The Avengers were one of the best punk bands. I’m proud that they’re from the Bay Area" (Billie Joe Armstrong, Green Day)
- "The Avengers, featuring singer Penelope Houston, helped lay the groundwork for political punk while giving the nascent musical form one of its first dynamic frontwomen. (San Antonio Current)"

== Members ==
=== Current ===
- Penelope Houston – vocals (1977–79, 1999, 2004– )
- Greg Ingraham – guitar (1977–79, 1999, 2004– )
- Joel Reader – bass (1999, 2004– )
- Luis Illades – drums (2004– )

=== Previous ===
- Danny Furious (Daniel O'Brien) – drums (1977–79)
- Jonathan Postal – bass (1977)
- Jimmy Wilsey – bass (1977–79) (died December 24, 2018)
- Brad Kent – guitar (1979) (died February 3, 2016)
- Danny Panic – drums (1999)

== Discography ==
=== Compilation albums ===
- Avengers (1983, CD Presents) – also issued as Cadillacs and Lincolns
- Died for Your Sins (1999, Lookout! Records)
- The American in Me (2004, DBK Works)

=== Live albums ===
- Zero Hour (2003, Get Back)
- Live at Winterland 1978 (2010, CD Presents)

=== EPs ===
- We Are the One (1977, Dangerhouse Records)
- Avengers (1979, White Noise Records)

=== Singles ===
- "Paint it Black" b/w "Thin White Line" (1983, CD Presents)
- "Teenage Rebel" b/w "Friends" (1995, Really Fast Records)
