= San Francisco Days =

Studio album by Chris Isaak
- Released: April 13, 1993
- Recorded: 1992–1993
- Genre: Rock and roll, rockabilly, roots rock
- Length: 41:30
- Label: Reprise
- Producer: Erik Jacobsen

Chris Isaak chronology
Heart Shaped World (1989)	San Francisco Days (1993)	Forever Blue (1995)

Singles from San Francisco Days
- 1. "Can't Do a Thing (To Stop Me)" Released: 1993; 2. "San Francisco Days" Released: 1993; 3. "Solitary Man" Released: 1993; 4. "Two Hearts" Released: 1993

Professional ratings
Review scores
Source	Rating
AllMusic	3/5 stars
Philadelphia Inquirer	3/4 stars

San Francisco Days is the fourth album by Chris Isaak, released in 1993. The album's sound was more upbeat than that of its predecessor, the darker Heart Shaped World, and Isaak's breakthrough hit "Wicked Game". It did not perform as well as Heart Shaped World, but was certified gold by the RIAA while several of its tracks became longtime staples of Isaak's live set. Later in 1993, the song "Two Hearts" was featured in the film True Romance and on its soundtrack.

The album was also Isaak's last to feature guitarist James Calvin Wilsey, who had been a member of his band since its formation, due to personal conflicts and drug problems. Wilsey only performed on a handful of tracks before departing, including the lead single, "Can't Do a Thing (To Stop Me)". The album was dedicated to the memory of Louie Beeson, who was the sound consultant.

== Track listing ==
All tracks composed by Chris Isaak; except where noted.

1. "San Francisco Days"
2. "Beautiful Homes"
3. "Round 'N' Round"
4. "Two Hearts"
5. "Can't Do a Thing (To Stop Me)" (Isaak, Brian Elliot)
6. "Except the New Girl"
7. "Waiting"
8. "Move Along"
9. "I Want Your Love"
10. "5:15"
11. "Lonely With a Broken Heart"
12. "Solitary Man" (Neil Diamond)

== Personnel ==
- Chris Isaak – vocals, guitar
- James Calvin Wilsey – lead guitar
- Rowland Salley – bass, vocals
- Kenney Dale Johnson – drums, vocals
- Jimmy Pugh – Hammond B3 organ on "I Want Your Love"
- Danny Gatton – lead guitar
- Jeff Watson – lead guitar
- Tom Brumley – pedal steel guitar

== Sales and certifications ==
Region	Certification	Certified units/sales
Australia (ARIA)	Gold	35,000^{^}
Canada (Music Canada)	Gold	50,000^{^}
United Kingdom (BPI)	Silver	60,000^{^}
United States (RIAA)	Gold	725,000
^{^} Shipments figures based on certification alone.
