= Cut You =

Studio album by Penelope Houston
- Released: 1996
- Genre: Alternative rock
- Label: Reprise
- Producers: Penelope Houston, Jeffrey Wood

Penelope Houston chronology
Crazy Baby (1994)	Cut You (1996)	Tongue (1998)

Cut You is an album by the American musician Penelope Houston, released in 1996. It is a mixture of rerecorded older songs and new songs. Cut You was Houston's major label debut; many of her previous albums had been available only in Germany. Houston promoted the album with North American and European tours.

== Production ==
Signed to Reprise Records by her old acquaintance Howie Klein, Houston composed six new songs, while adding more instrumentation to her rerecorded older ones. The album was produced by Houston and Jeffrey Wood. Reprise asked Houston to withdraw "Cut You"; she instead made it the title track. "Secret Sign" is about a run-in with a ex's new girlfriend.

== Critical reception ==
Professional ratings
Review scores
Source	Rating
AllMusic	3/5 stars
Chicago Tribune	3.5/4 stars
Los Angeles Times	3/4 stars
MusicHound Rock: The Essential Album Guide	3.5/5 stars

No Depression thought that Houston's songs "tend to involve many nameless, spiritually wiped-out characters captured in moments of particular drama ... instead of telling the whole story as a traditional folksinger might, Houston is more of a tour guide." Trouser Press deemed the album "a solid cross-section of her material ... the playing and recording quality are absolutely vibrant and Houston sings as wonderfully as ever." The Chicago Tribune concluded that Houston "goes well beyond empowerment, penning lyrics as smart as they are wicked." The Los Angeles Times wrote that "'Locket' glides along to a Latin-tinged beat while the title track, with its light country twang and darkly comic lyric, evokes a vindictive, post-punk incarnation of Patsy Cline."

Tulsa World stated that "the songs are built around intricate lyrical jabs and worldly insights." The Washington Post determined that "what's most impressive about Cut You is Houston's vivid depictions of women who are attempting to square their reality with sometimes fading desires and dreams." Rolling Stone opined that "Houston ties it together with gossamer vocals and lyrics that invert the accusations of punk." The Boston Globe called the album "mature rock with punk roots, soft songs with sting."

AllMusic wrote that the album "offers proof that Houston helped pioneer the melodic-yet-hard-hitting alternative rock currently mined by such performers as Liz Phair and Aimee Mann."

== Track listing ==
No.	Title	Length
1.	"Secret Sign"
2.	"Sweetheart"
3.	"Scratch"
4.	"Locket"
5.	"Fuzzy Throne"
6.	"Ride"
7.	"Harry Dean"
8.	"Waiting Room"
9.	"Qualities of Mercy"
10.	"Fall Back"
11.	"Pull"
12.	"Glad I'm a Girl"
13.	"White Out"
14.	"Cut You"
