= VOM (punk rock band) =

US musical group

- Origin: Los Angeles, California, U.S.
- Genres: Punk rock, garage rock
- Years active: 1977–1978
- Past members: Richard Meltzer; Gregg Turner "Metal" Mike Saunders; Dave Guzman

VOM was conceived in the fall of 1977 as a self-described beat combo featuring the renowned writer and critic Richard Meltzer on vocals, with Gregg Turner on second vocals and "Metal" Mike Saunders (under the pseudonym "Ted Klusewski") on drums. The band also featured Dave Guzman on "tuneless rhythm guitar", Lisa Brenneis ("Gurl") on bass guitar, and Phil Koehn on lead guitar. The name VOM was an abbreviation for "vomit", as their early live act was said by Meltzer and Turner to have included throwing various viscera, cow parts and food substances at the audience to provoke a reaction.

Both Meltzer and Saunders had already contributed to music as a whole in distinct conduits. Richard Meltzer had written The Aesthetics of Rock (written in '68 but published in '70) which was certainly the first serious discussion of rock music in long format as an art form. Mike Saunders was credited for coining the term "heavy metal" as a music genre while writing for Rolling Stone. In 1970, he wrote: "Here [Humble Pie] were a noisy, unmelodic, heavy metal-leaden shit-rock band, with the loud and noisy parts beyond doubt," in a review of As Safe As Yesterday Is. "This album," he continues, "more of the same 27th-rate heavy metal crap, is worse than the first two put together, though I know that sounds incredible." Although Saunders himself states that the title is "right there" in Steppenwolf's "Born to Be Wild" ("heavy metal thunder...") and the term predates even this in William S. Burroughs' novel The Wild Boys, Saunders was the first to lend it to the new hard rock of Led Zeppelin and Black Sabbath.

Besides "I'm in Love With Your Mom" and "Too Animalistic" (both later incorporated into the Angry Samoans catalog), VOM were notorious for a song called "Electrocute Your Cock", which began with Saunders' Ramones-like tom tom beat and Meltzer's cries of "Electrocute your cock, electrocute your cock / Looking for a handjob? Stick it in a clock!". Despite its profane audacity, it had enough pop catchiness and wit to become a minor hit for the band. Other VOM material included "Broads Are Equal" and "I Am (The Son of Sam)".

The band released the posthumous Live at Surf City EP in 1978 on White Noise Records; "I'm in Love With Your Mom" also appeared on the punk and new wave compilation Saturday Night Pogo, one of the earliest releases by Rhino Records.

Videos were produced for three of the EP's tracks, "I'm in Love With Your Mom", "Too Animalistic" and "Electrocute Your Cock", directed by Richard Casey (who went on to create videos for Blue Öyster Cult, Buck Dharma and Romeo Void). "I'm in Love With Your Mom" was shot as the band performed on the beach, with Turner wearing briefs on his head. The more humorous and visually interesting "Electrocute Your Cock" video included footage of Meltzer sprawling backwards in a chair while screaming the lyrics and sitting in a bathtub being electrocuted. Both videos (and interviews with Meltzer, Saunders and Turner) were later included in the Angry Samoans True Documentary 1995 home video.

According to Turner, Meltzer "threw in the VOM towel" in 1977, which paved the way for Turner and Saunders to form Angry Samoans in August 1978.

In 2002, Meltzer released all five of the EP's tracks, plus the previously unissued "I Live With the Roaches", on the compilation The Completed Soundtrack for the Tropic of Nipples.

== Discography ==
=== EPs ===
- Live at Surf City EP (1978, White Noise Records)

=== Compilation appearances ===
- "I'm in Love with Your Mom" on Saturday Night Pogo (1978, Rhino Records)
- Six tracks on The Completed Soundtrack for the Tropic of Nipples (2002, Off Records)
