= STP Not LSD =

Studio album by Angry Samoans
- Released: 1988
- Recorded: November–December 1987
- Studio: Penguin Studios, Glendale, California
- Genre: Punk rock, garage punk
- Length: 23:24
- Label: PVC
- Producer: Bill Inglot

Angry Samoans chronology
Yesterday Started Tomorrow (1987)	STP Not LSD (1988)	Return to Samoa (1990)

Professional ratings
Review scores
Source	Rating
AllMusic	2.5/5 stars
Christgau's Record Guide	B+
Kerrang!	3.5/5 stars
Kerrang!	4.75/5

STP Not LSD is the third album by the American punk rock band Angry Samoans, released in 1988 on PVC Records. The album was re-issued in 1990 by Triple X Records.

== Track listing ==
Side one

1. "I Lost (My Mind)" (Mike Saunders, Gregg Turner) – 1:57
2. "Wild Hog Rhyde" (Saunders, Turner) – 2:07
3. "Laughing at Me" (Michael Bruce, Glen Buxton, Alice Cooper, Dennis Dunaway, Neal Smith) – 1:47
4. "STP Not LSD" (Saunders) – 2:05
5. "Staring at the Sun" (Saunders) – 1:36
6. "Death of Beewak" (Todd Homer, Saunders) – 2:07

Side two

7. "Egyptomania" (Homer, Turner) – 1:37
8. "Attack of the Mushroom People" (Saunders) – 2:44
9. "Feet on the Ground" (Homer) – 1:18
10. "Garbage Pit" (Saunders) – 1:40
11. "(I'll Drink to This) Love Song" (Saunders) – 2:04
12. "Lost Highway" (Saunders) – 2:25

== Personnel ==
Angry Samoans

- "Metal" Mike Saunders – vocals, rhythm guitar
- Gregg Turner – vocals, guitar
- Todd Homer – bass, vocals
- Steve Drojensky – lead and rhythm guitar
- Bill Vockeroth – drums

Production

- Bill Inglot – producer, engineer
- John Strother – engineer
- Ken Perry – mastering
