= Heart Shaped World (Chris Isaak album) =

Studio album by Chris Isaak
- Released: June 13, 1989
- Recorded: 1988
- Studios: Fantasy Studios (Berkeley); Dave Wellhausen Recording (San Francisco)
- Genres: Rockabilly, roots rock, soft rock, acoustic rock
- Length: 46:05
- Label: Reprise
- Producer: Erik Jacobsen

Chris Isaak chronology
Chris Isaak (1987)	Heart Shaped World (1989)	San Francisco Days (1993)

Singles from Heart Shaped World
- 1. "Don't Make Me Dream About You" Released: 1989

Heart Shaped World is the third studio album by American musician Chris Isaak. Released on June 13, 1989, by Reprise Records, it became Isaak's breakthrough album, propelled by the success of the Top 10 hit "Wicked Game". It remains his best-selling work and has been certified double platinum by the RIAA.

== Reception ==
Professional ratings
Review scores
Source	Rating
AllMusic	4.5/5 stars
Chicago Tribune	3.5/4 stars
NME	8/10
Orlando Sentinel	5/5 stars
Record Mirror	4 1/2/5
The Rolling Stone Album Guide	3.5/5 stars
Select	4/5

When Heart Shaped World was released in the summer of 1989, it was on the Billboard 200 for ten weeks, peaking at number 149; but in October 1990, after Lee Chesnut, music director of WAPW in Atlanta, played the song "Wicked Game" repeatedly over two weeks after hearing an instrumental version on the soundtrack from the 1990 David Lynch film Wild at Heart. "Wicked Game" was released as a single, and the album reached the U.S. Top 10 peaking at number 7 on the Billboard chart by April 1991, garnering sales of more than 500,000 copies. The video for the single, filmed in black and white, featured a topless Helena Christensen and a shirtless Isaak in the surf and on the beach. It was shown in heavy rotation on MTV.

In March 1991, Entertainment Weekly described the scene at the sold-out start of his post-"Wicked Game" release tour:

Reprise staged a gaudy, sold-out gig at L.A.'s Wiltern Theater. Sean Penn was there. So were Eric Roberts, k.d. lang, Dwight Yoakam, and, standing discreetly in a side aisle, Bruce Springsteen and Patti Scialfa. There were lots of young girls, whose screaming Isaak may have to get used to. Afterward came The Hollywood Party, where, amid more dazzling stars, Isaak (decked out in his shiny brocade stage suit) got his first gold record while the waiters passed around goat cheese quesadillas and a Hawaiian band played in the background. It was a lot to handle, but then, as Isaak had said the night before..., "I used to tar-paper roofs for a living. So, as far as I'm concerned, this is a pretty fun job."

At the first of a May 1991 two-night stand at the Beacon Theatre in New York City—the first in that city after "Wicked Game" became a top 10 hit— Isaak's performance was characterized as "consummate showmanship": performances "right on the edge of caricature" yet with the ability to "infuse the ballads "Wicked Game" and "Blue Spanish Sky" ... with a spine-tingling intensity."

== Track listing ==
All tracks are written by Chris Isaak except where noted.

No.	Title	Writer(s)	Length
1.	"Heart Shaped World"		3:30
2.	"I'm Not Waiting"		3:16
3.	"Don't Make Me Dream About You"		3:33
4.	"Kings of the Highway"		4:47
5.	"Wicked Game"		4:49
6.	"Blue Spanish Sky"		3:58
7.	"Wrong to Love You"		4:20
8.	"Forever Young"		3:23
9.	"Nothing's Changed"		4:08
10.	"In the Heat of the Jungle"		6:20
11.	"Diddley Daddy" (CD bonus track)	Bo Diddley, Harvey Fuqua	4:01

"Diddley Daddy" had been first released on Shag: Original Motion Picture Soundtrack (1989)

== Personnel ==
Adapted from Discogs.

Musicians

- Chris Isaak – vocals, guitar
- James Calvin Wilsey – lead guitar
- Rowland Salley – bass guitar, vocals
- Kenney Dale Johnson – drums, vocals

Additional personnel

- Prairie Prince – drums, percussion
- Frank Martin – keyboards, piano
- Pete Scaturro – keyboards
- Christine Wall – vocals
- Cynthia Lloyd – vocals
- Chris Solberg – bass
- Joni Haastrup – keyboards

Production

- Erik Jacobsen – production
- Mark Needham – engineering
- Daniel Levitin – sound design
- Lee Herschberg – mixing assistance
- Greg Fulginiti at Artisan Sound Recorders – mastering
- Lex Van Rossen – front cover photography

== Charts ==
=== Weekly charts ===
Chart (1989–1991)	Peak position
Australian Albums (ARIA)	17
Canadian Albums (RPM)	6
Dutch Albums (Album Top 100)	50
New Zealand Albums (RMNZ)	12
Norwegian Albums (VG-lista)	16
UK Albums (Official Charts)	7
US Billboard 200 (1989 peak)	149
US Billboard 200 (1991 peak)	7

=== Sales and certifications ===
Region	Certification	Certified units/sales
Canada (Music Canada)	Platinum	100,000^{^}
United States (RIAA)	2× Platinum	2,600,000
^{^} Shipments figures based on certification alone.
