= The Aesthetics of Rock =

Book by Richard Meltzer

- Author: Richard Meltzer
- Language: English
- Genre: Non-fiction
- Publisher: Something Else Press, Da Capo Press
- Publication date: 1970

The Aesthetics of Rock is a book by Richard Meltzer (born May 10, 1945). Written between 1965 and 1968, it was first published in 1970 by Something Else Press. In 1987, Da Capo Press published an unabridged second edition, with a new foreword by Meltzer. It is one of the first major works of rock-music criticism and analysis. He wrote it as an undergraduate at the State University of New York at Stony Brook and as a graduate student at Yale University, from which he was, as he relates in his foreword, "kicked out toot-sweet on my rock-roll caboose" for writing papers with rock-music themes for philosophy classes.

Writer Greil Marcus, in his introduction to the Da Capo edition of Aesthetics, maintains that the book is "the best and most obsessive book about the Beatles ever written," and that the work seeks to illuminate "the collapse of art into everyday life, and vice versa."
