= The Chris Isaak Hour =

- Starring: Chris Isaak (2009)
- Country of origin: United States
- No. of episodes: 8

Production
- Running time: 60 min. per episode

Original release
- Network: The Biography Channel
- Release: February 26, 2009

The Chris Isaak Hour is a one-hour talk show that aired in 2009 on The Biography Channel, in which singer Chris Isaak interviews and plays alongside other musical artists such as Stevie Nicks and Glen Campbell. The channel currently airs re-runs on Thursdays and Saturdays.

== Episodes ==
1. Trisha Yearwood (February 26, 2009)
2. Stevie Nicks (March 5, 2009)
3. Glen Campbell (March 12, 2009)
4. Michael Bublé (March 19, 2009)
5. Chicago (March 26, 2009)
6. The Smashing Pumpkins (April 2, 2009)
7. Yusuf Islam (Cat Stevens) (April 9, 2009)
8. Jewel (April 16, 2009)
