= James Calvin Wilsey =

- Born: July 12, 1957; Logansport, Indiana, U.S.
- Died: December 24, 2018 (aged 61) Los Angeles, California
- Genres: Punk rock, rock and roll, rockabilly, instrumental rock
- Occupation: Musician
- Instrument: Guitar
- Years active: 1977–2018
- Label: Lakeshore Records
- Formerly of: Avengers

James Calvin Wilsey (July 12, 1957 – December 24, 2018) was an American musician. He played bass with San Francisco punk band the Avengers, but became better known as the lead guitarist for Chris Isaak's band Silvertone. He featured on Isaak's albums Silvertone, Chris Isaak, Heart Shaped World, and San Francisco Days, and is widely remembered for his distinctive guitar tone and technique, being dubbed the "King of Slow" by fans. After leaving Isaak's band, Wilsey pursued various solo projects while struggling with drug addiction and, toward the end of his life, periods of homelessness. He died from multiple organ failure related to hepatitis and drug use.

== Musical style ==
Wilsey's 1965 Fender Stratocaster and use of reverb, delay and gentle vibrato gave a distinctive sound to Isaak hits such as "Wicked Game" (the opening two-note riff, in his own words, "crystallizes Wilsey's approach") and "Blue Hotel". Producer Erik Jacobsen remarked, "In terms of the feeling Jimmy was able to put into a song with the wang bar and the tremolo and effects — Jimmy had a really magical touch..."

== Career ==
In 1977, Wilsey joined the Avengers, a pioneering band in the San Francisco punk rock scene. The band notably opened for the Sex Pistols at the Winterland Ballroom in January 1978, which led to Pistols guitarist Steve Jones sponsoring their recording career. Though the Avengers only released two EPs and a few compilation tracks during their initial run, the band influenced later San Francisco bands such as Dead Kennedys and Flipper, with Dead Kennedys bassist Klaus Fluoride praising Wilsey's use of octaves.

Wilsey joined Chris Isaak's band Silvertone shortly after its formation in 1980. They initially played in many local San Francisco night clubs. Isaak recalled upon Wilsey's death that "Jimmy had so much heart and a great sound". However, the two became estranged by the early 1990s due to Wilsey's impatience with Isaak's behavior and his own worsening drug problems.

In 1998, Wilsey formed a short-lived instrumental band called the Mysteries. Dropping the moniker "Calvin", Wilsey released a solo album of guitar instrumentals in 2008, titled El Dorado, which paid homage to musical influences such as Duane Eddy, the Shadows, Billy Strange, James Burton and Link Wray. Wilsey's last commercial recording under his own name was in 2012, when he contributed a cover of Johnny Cash's "The Man Comes Around" to the soundtrack to the film Killing Them Softly. In 2017, he played guitar on Miss Derringer's cover of "Unchained Melody".

== Personal life and death ==
In the 1990s, Wilsey met fashion boutique owner and designer Winter Mullender. They married in 2003 and had a son. They divorced in 2008. Wilsey's health declined and in 2013 he developed hepatitis C and cirrhosis of the liver. His drug use reportedly continued during this time. He reconnected and temporarily cohabited with Mullender, but they were evicted in 2018 and became homeless. Wilsey was taken to LAC+USC Medical Center in December of that year with the onset of organ failure, and died on the afternoon of December 24.

== Selected discography ==
=== Solo ===
- El Dorado (2008)

=== With the Avengers ===
- We Are the One EP (1977)
- Avengers EP (1979)
- Avengers (1983)
- Died for Your Sins (1999)
- Zero Hour (2003)
- The American in Me (2004)
- Live at Winterland 1978 (2010)

=== With Chris Isaak ===
- Silvertone (1985)
- Chris Isaak (1986)
- Heart Shaped World (1989)
- San Francisco Days (1993)
