= Angry Samoans =

American punk rock band

- the Angry Samoans in 1989

Background information
- Origin: Van Nuys, California, U.S.
- Genres: Hardcore punk, garage punk
- Years active: 1978–present
- Labels: Bad Trip, Triple X
- Past members: Gregg Turner; Todd Homer; Jeff Dahl; Bonze Blayk; P.J. Galligan; Steve Drojensky; Alison Victor; Mark Byrne; Jonathan Hall; Kevin Joseph; Landon Gale-George; Todd Homer; Scott Greer; Heith Seifert; Mike "Cyco Loco" Avilez; Adrianne Harmon; Dan Siegal; Matt "Malice" Vicknair; John Voorhies
- Website: angrysamoans.com

The Angry Samoans is an American punk rock band from the first wave of American punk. Formed in August 1978 in Los Angeles, California, by early 1970s rock writer "Metal" Mike Saunders, his sibling lead guitarist Bonze Blayk and Gregg Turner (another rock writer, for Creem from the late 1970s through the mid-1980s), along with original recruits Todd Homer (bass) and Bill Vockeroth (drums). Other members include P.J. Galligan on lead guitar (1979-84), Jeff Dahl on vocals (1981) and Steve Drojensky on lead guitar (1984-88). Their first vinyl release was Inside My Brain in 1980. Studio albums include Back from Samoa (1982), STP Not LSD (1988) and the aptly titled album, The '90s Suck and So Do You. Their song "Get Off the Air" led them being banned in several venues in the LA / Hollywood district.

== History ==
=== Pre-Samoans ===
In 1969 the Saunders/Blayk siblings cut a 14-song high school garage rock album, I'm a Roadrunner Motherfucka, in their hometown of Little Rock, under a twice-used local band name, the Rockin' Blewz. The album went unissued until the late 1990s.

Timeline of the Angry Samoans releases and members

Mike Saunders briefly played in an early backing lineup for 1950s rockabilly cult artist Ray Campi during 1975, before moving back to Arkansas for two years (pursuant to a second college degree).

Bassist Homer had played in 1977 Masque-era band Jesus Prick, and drummer Vockeroth was a veteran of the Pasadena "backyard kegger party" cover band circuit (which also spawned Van Halen).

During 1978, both Turner and Mike Saunders played with rock critic Richard Meltzer in the Los Angeles punk band VOM, which issued a posthumous five-song EP, Live at Surf City, on White Noise Records in early summer 1978.

Patrick "P.J." Galligan was formerly a member of heavy metal band Cirith Ungol. Galligan died from throat cancer in 2014.

=== Original lineup ===
The first Angry Samoans gig was on October 30, 1978, opening for Roky Erickson and the Aliens in Richmond, California. Erickson was sick and did not make the show (Aliens band members covered for his lead vocals) but remained a lifelong friend and inspiration to Turner. The next night, the Samoans played an "all-LA bill" at the Mabuhay Gardens in San Francisco, opening for Shock and the Zeros.

The Samoans' first release, Inside My Brain, featuring P.J. Galligan on lead guitar as a replacement for Bonze Blayk, was one of the earliest hardcore punk albums to come out of the 1980s LA punk rock scene. Between this recording and second album Back from Samoa, the band released a four-song EP as "The Queer Pills", allegedly using the pseudonym for the EP to get airtime on Rodney Bingenheimer's KROQ radio program. Their 14-song, 17-minute hardcore album, Back from Samoa, released in 1982, featured lyrics with such themes as the trendiness of poking your eyes out ("Lights Out"), anthropomorphizing Adolf Hitler's penis ("They Saved Hitler's Cock"), and dissing your father ("My Old Man's a Fatso"), sung over heavily distorted guitars and early LA/OC hardcore drum beats.

In the mid-1980s, the Angry Samoans added guitarist Steve Drojensky, and returned to their roots in mid-1960s American garage rock (they had long cited bands such as the Velvet Underground, the 13th Floor Elevators and Shadows of Knight as among their musical influences). The next two releases recorded during 1986–87, the Yesterday Started Tomorrow EP and STP Not LSD, were largely in this neo-1960s garage/psych style.

=== "Get Off the Air" controversy ===
In late January 1979, Mike Saunders, Turner and Homer wrote an infamous song about longtime LA/Hollywood scenemaker and KROQ-FM DJ Rodney Bingenheimer, titled "Get Off the Air". When the song was included on the band's first record, Inside My Brain, the Samoans were blacklisted at the Starwood, the Whisky a Go Go, and other clubs in the Hollywood/LA area from mid-1980 through late 1982, seemingly due to Bingenheimer's strong influence within the LA/Hollywood club scene.

=== Member changes and other projects ===
Homer left at the end of 1988 and formed the Mooseheart Faith Stellar Groove Band with Larry Robinson, formerly of 1970s teen pop-soul band Apollo. In 2005, Homer formed free-jazz band the Hollywood Squaretet with comedian/drummer Larry "Copcar" Scarano, formerly of Comedy's Dirtiest Dozen (HBO), and the 1960s New York rock band, the Bougalieu.

Turner left in early 1992, releasing an album, Santa Fe, in 1993 with the Mistaken, which featured guitarist Sean O'Brien (formerly of Come), bassist Heath Siefert (formerly of Backbiter) and drummers Elizabyth Burtis and Kelly Callan (formerly of Wednesday Week). Turner's next band, the Blood Drained Cows, issued two albums, and occasionally features autoharp player Billy Angel (née Miller) from the Aliens.

During the mid- to late 1980s, Mike Saunders moonlighted in several electric/acoustic two-guitar duos (no rhythm section) such as the Clash Brothers (with Bob Fagan), the Sons of Mellencamp (with Turner), and the Gizmo Brothers (with Kenne Highland), performing at various small clubs during that period in San Francisco, LA/OC, and even Boston (with Krazee Ken Highland from the Gizmos and Hopelessly Obscure).

=== Recent activity ===
The Angry Samoans have continued from the late 1980s onward with Mike Saunders, original drummer Vockeroth and a wide variety of other individuals. They have performed mainly along the West Coast, aside from occasional out-of-state weekend trips and three short, successful tours of mainland Europe in 2003, 2007 and 2008. In 2010, they performed on the Legends Stage on four dates of the Vans Warped Tour.

Gregg Turner has toured in October 2019 with the Oblivians as a solo act, in anticipation of a re-release of the Angry Samoans discography.

Mike Saunders stopped performing with Angry Samoans in 2016. Drummer Bill Vockeroth has continued touring with a variety of additional members performing guitar, bass and vocals. Vockeroth previously used the name "Angry Samoan" to indicate the band contained only one original member, but has since changed to billing his version of the band as "Angry Samoans" as of 2025.

== Discography ==
=== Studio albums ===
- Back from Samoa (Bad Trip) (1982)
- STP Not LSD (PVC) (1988)
- The '90s Suck and So Do You (Triple X) (1999)

=== EPs ===
- Inside My Brain (Bad Trip) (1980)
- Queer Pills (1981) – pseudonymous release
- Yesterday Started Tomorrow (Triple X) (1986)
- Fuck the War EP (Bad Trip) (2006)
- I'm in Love with Your Mom (aka Too Animalistic: The 1978 Demos) (Bad Trip) (2010) – recorded in September 1978

=== Other releases ===
- Gimme Samoa: 31 Garbage-Pit Hits (PVC) (1987)
- Return to Samoa (1990) – unauthorized bootleg
- Live at Rhino Records (Triple X) (1990) – recorded in May 1979
- The Unboxed Set (Triple X) (1995) – first two EPs and first two studio albums on one CD

=== Compilation appearances ===
- Underground Hits 1 (Aggressive Rockprodaktiones) (1982) – "Poshboy's Cock", "Right Side of My Mind", "Pictures of Matchstick Men"
- Annoy Your Neighbor With This Tape! cassette (Chainsaw Tapes) (1982) – "Steak Knife", "Lights Out"
- Underground Hits 2 (Aggressive Rockprodaktiones) (1983) – "Hot Cars", "Inside"
- High Muck cassette (Didco Productions) (1983) – "Pictures of Matchstick Men"
- Life Is A Joke Vol. 2 (Weird System) 1986) – "Psych-Out 129", "Unhinged"
- Passport Summer Sampler 1987 cassette (Passport) (1987) – "Right Side of My Mind"
- Speed Air Play December 1, 1988 cassette (Speed Air Play) 1988 – "Garbage Pit"
- Triple X Records Compilation #4: Hear 'Em Spin (Triple X) (1990) – "I've Lost My Mind"
- Faster & Louder (hardcore Punk, Vol. 1) (Rhino) (1993) – "Lights Out"
- Slam Chops (Triple X) (1995) – "Right Side of My Mind"
- Son of Slam Chops (Triple X) (1997) – "Right Side of My Mind"
- The New, The Classic & The Unexplored (Visions Magazine) (1999) – "Haitzman's Brain Is Calling"
- Sepultura + 11 Bandas Punk (Trip/Trauma/Roadrunner Records) (1999) – "Inside My Brain"
- American Revolution 1 – More Hardcore Punk From Around the United States CDr (Killer Boat) (2000) – "Inside My Brain"
- Exxxile on Main Street (Triple X) (2000) – "Lights Out"
- For Those About To Rock – A Punk Tribute to AC/DC (Cleopatria Records|Cleopatria) (2002) "Highway To Hell"
- A Punk Tribute To Weezer (Cleopatria) (2002) – "Buddy Holly"
- Modern Rock Loud And Raw 2XCD (Time Life Music/Warner Special Products) (2000) – "Lights Out"
- 5 Years Dedicated to a Better Taste in Fine Music (Cargo) (2003) – "Inside My Brain"
- Punk Story 3XCD (Wagram) (2004) – "Inside My Brain"
- Punk Riot 4XCD (BMG) (2004) – "Ballad of Jerry Curlan", "Inside My Brain"
- Welcome to the Anarchy Library Vol. 1 (Gale Force) (2006) – "Lights Out"
- Punk Goes Metal (Cleopatria) (2007) – "Highway To Hell"
- High Voltage- The Ultimate AC/DC Tribute (Redline) (2008) – "Highway To Hell"
- The Most Explosive Tribute – AC/DC 2XCD (Cherry Red) (2009) – "Highway To Hell"
- Punk Legends Playing The Songs of AC/DC 2XLP (Delta Entertainment|Cargp) (2013) – "Highway To Hell"

== Band members ==
Timeline of the Angry Samoans releases and members

=== Vocalists ===
- "Metal Mike" Saunders – vocals, guitar, drums (1978–2016)
- Gregg Turner – vocals, guitar (1978–1991)
- Todd Homer – vocals, bass (1978–1988)
- Bill Vockeroth – vocals, drums (1978–present)
- Jeff Dahl – vocals (1981)

=== Guitarists ===
- Bonze Blayk – lead guitar (1978–1979)
- P.J. Galligan – lead guitar (1979–1984)
- Steve Drojensky – lead guitar (1984–1988)
- Alison Victor – lead guitar (1996)
- Mark Byrne – guitar (1996–1998)
- Jonathan Hall – lead guitar (1998–2003)
- Kevin Joseph – lead guitar (2006–2010)
- Landon Gale-George – guitar (2007)
- Colin Alflen – lead guitar (2011–present)
- Nathan Javier – lead guitar (2012–present)

=== Bass Guitarists ===
- Todd Homer – vocals, bass (1978–1988)
- Scott Greer – bass (1988–1990)
- Heith Seifert – bass (1990–1991)
- Mike "Cyco Loco" Avilez (of Oppressed Logic) – bass (1996)
- Adrianne Harmon – bass (1997)
- Rick Dasher – bass (2005, 2008, present)
- Dan Siegal – bass (2007)
- Matt "Malice" Vicknair – bass (2009–2011)
- John Voorhies – bass (2011–2013)
- Sean Rowley - bass (2022-2023)
