= Jeff Dahl =

American musician

- Born: 1955 (age 69–70)
- Origin: Stuttgart, West Germany
- Genres: Punk
- Occupation: Musician
- Instrument(s): Vocals, guitar
- Years active: 1977–present
- Website: myspace.com/jeffdahlband

Jeff Dahl (born 1955) is an American musician.

Dahl recorded his first single, "Rock N Roll Critic", in 1977, which was released on the Doodley Squat label. Dahl later performed in The Angry Samoans (in 1981 after vocalist and guitarist "Metal" Mike Saunders dropped out of the band for a year) and Powertrip, and played and recorded with Cheetah Chrome (Dead Boys) and Rikk Agnew (Adolescents). He was also a member of Vox Pop (along with members of the Germs, 45 Grave and Dream Syndicate) and has recorded with Poison Idea and "Demons".

Dahl has performed on approximately 26 albums (including studio albums, live albums, bootlegs, and best-of collections) and 100 singles, many out of print. He has toured extensively and worked in studio production in the United States, Europe and Japan.
