= Michael Zagaris =

American sports and rock and roll photographer

- Born: February 22, 1945 (age 81); Chicago, Illinois, U.S.
- Education: George Washington University (BA)
- Occupation: Photographer
- Known for: Sports and Rock and Roll photography
- Notable credit(s): Time Magazine, Rolling Stone and Sports Illustrated
- Spouse: Kristin Sundbom
- Children: Ari Zagaris
- Website: Z-Man Photography

Michael Zagaris (born February 22, 1945) is an American sports and rock and roll photographer known for his work on the Oakland Athletics, San Francisco 49ers, and the 1970s Rock & Roll scene.

== Early life and education ==
Born in Chicago, Michael Zagaris moved to Modesto, California as a toddler. Before 7th grade, in 1957, he moved with his family north to Redding, California and attended St. Joseph School. While living in Redding, Zagaris boarded at Bellarmine College Preparatory and later returned to attend Enterprise High School. Zagaris played both baseball and football while attending Shasta College, where his skills as a wide receiver of the football team earned him a scholarship to George Washington University. Zagaris graduated from George Washington University in 1967 and enrolled in Santa Clara Law School. In Law School, Zagaris worked as a speechwriter for Senator Bobby Kennedy. Zagaris' whole life changed when he witnessed Senator Kennedy's assassination.

== Rock & Roll Photography ==
After dropping out of Law School after one year, Zagaris began to embrace his photography hobby, finding ways to get on the field at 49ers games and backstage at concerts. While reviewing some of Zagaris' photos after a concert, Eric Clapton advised Zagaris to pursue photography as a steady gig. Throughout the 1970s, Zagaris would photograph some of the popular bands of all time, including The Grateful Dead, The Clash, Blondie, The Who, and Tom Petty.

== Sports Photography ==
While in high school, Zagaris used to take discarded press passes from the field at Kezar Stadium and use them to gain access to the field to take photographs of the San Francisco 49ers. After years of finding his way onto the field, the 49ers made Zagaris the official team photographer in 1973. In 1981, Walter Haas bought the Oakland Athletics and Zagaris was brought in as their official team photographer. In the years since, Zagaris has photographed 34 Super Bowls, 12 World Series, and 14 MLB All-Star Games. His sports photography has graced the covers of Time Magazine and Sports Illustrated. Zagaris' sports photography is famous for its intimacy, as he gives the viewer a rare look behind the scenes in the clubhouse and the locker room to see a different side of the team.

== Books ==
- Halfin, Ross (2023). Pronounced: A Photographic History of Lynyrd Skynyrd 1973-1977. Rufus Stone Limited Editions. p. 340.
- Zagaris, Michael (2022). Field of Play: 60 Years of Shooting the NFL. Cameron + Company. p. 296. ISBN 9781951836764.
- Kettmann, Steve (2021). Remember Who You Are: What Pedro Gomez Showed Us About Baseball and Life. Wellstone Books. ISBN 9780960061518.
- Maiocco, Matt & Zagaris, Michael & Mangin, Brad (2019). Letters to 87: Fans Remember the Legacy of Dwight Clark. Cameron Books. ISBN 9781944903770.
- Gomez, Pedro & Henderson, Rickey & Beane, Billy & Armstrong, Billie Joe (2017). 50 Years of Oakland A's Baseball. San Diego, California: Rare Art Press Limited. ISBN 9780999092163.
- Zagaris, Michael (2016). Total Excess. London: Rare Art Press Limited. ISBN 9781909526402.
- Barber, Phil & Walsh, Bill & Barnidge, Tom & Zagaris, Michael (2003). We Were Champions - The 49ers' Dynasty in Their Own Words. NFL Properties.
- Dickey, Glenn & Zagaris, Michael (1995). The San Francisco 49ers: The First Fifty Years. Turner Pub.
- Hickey, J. T. & Zagaris, Michael (1991). Oakland A's. San Francisco, CA: Chronicle Books. ISBN 0877018928.
- Dickey, Glenn & Zagaris, Michael (1989). San Francisco 49ers: The Super Years. San Francisco, CA: Chronicle Books. ISBN 0877017026.

== Filmography ==
Year	Title	Self	Crew	Notes
2004	NFL Films Presents	Yes	No	1 episode: "Michael Zagaris"
2000-2006	ESPN SportsCentury	Yes	No	3 episodes: "Billy Martin: Part 2," "Tom Brady," "Terrell Owens"
2007	Amazing Journey: The Story of The Who	No	Yes	documentary (archival material)
2012	All the Years Combine: The DVD Collection	No	Yes	documentary (archival material)
2013	I Am Divine	No	Yes	documentary (archival material)
2014	They Shot the Rock and Lived by the Roll	Yes	No	documentary
2017	Long Strange Trip	No	Yes	documentary (archival photographs)
2018	If I Leave Here Tomorrow: A Film About Lynyrd Skynyrd	No	Yes	documentary (archival materials)
2019	Show Me The Picture: The Story of Jim Marshall	Yes	No	documentary
2020	ICON: Music Through the Lens	Yes	No	6 episodes
2021	PLUM: A Baseball Life	Yes	Yes	documentary
2021	Count Me In	No	Yes	Netflix documentary (archival material)
2023	San Francisco Sounds: A Place in Time	No	Yes	MGM+ documentary (special thanks)
2026	Gold Rush	Yes	Yes	AMC documentary
TBD	Zagaris	Yes	No	documentary by Scott Duncan Films

== Personal life ==
Zagaris has lived in the Haight-Ashbury neighborhood in San Francisco since 1973, with his girlfriend Kristin Sundbom. Their son Ari Zagaris is an actor. Chris Isaak babysat Ari.

While growing up in Redding, Zagaris played sandlot baseball at Buck Martinez's house and American Legion baseball for the 1963 Redding Tigers, managed by Joe Hatten, with future major leaguer Bill Plummer and Gene Parent, father of Mark Parent.
