= Chris Isaak =

American rock musician (born 1956)

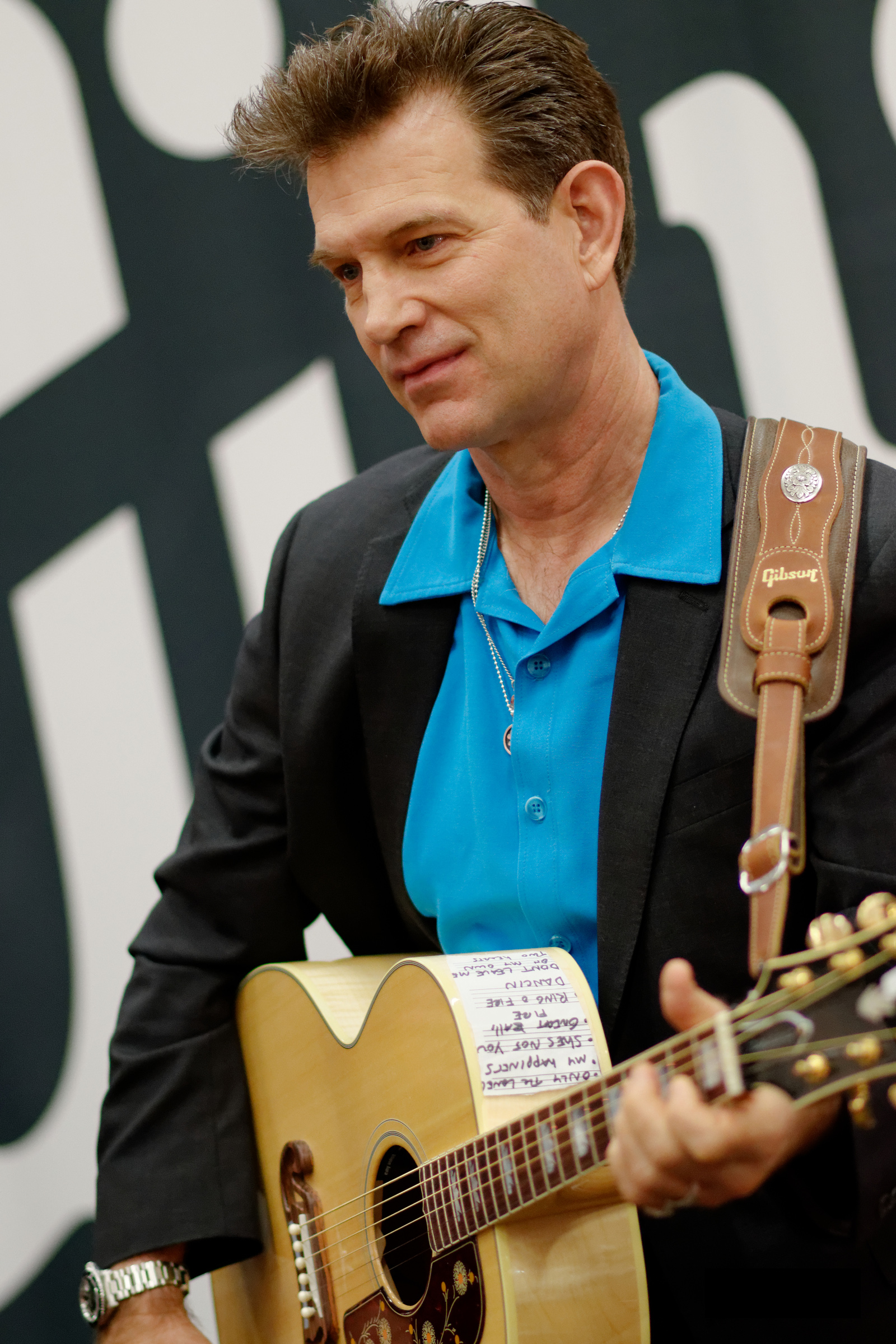
- Isaak in 2014

Background information
- Born: Christopher Joseph Isaak; June 26, 1956 (age 70); Stockton, California, U.S.
- Genres: Rockabilly; country; rock and roll; soft rock
- Occupations: Singer; songwriter; guitarist; actor
- Instruments: Vocals; guitar; bass
- Years active: 1978–present
- Labels: Reprise/Warner Bros.; Vanguard
- Website: chrisisaak.com

Christopher Joseph Isaak (born June 26, 1956) is an American singer, songwriter, guitarist and occasional actor. Noted for his reverb-laden rockabilly revivalist style and wide vocal range, he is widely known for his breakthrough hit and signature song "Wicked Game" as well as international hits "Blue Hotel", "Baby Did a Bad Bad Thing", and "Somebody's Crying".

With a career spanning four decades, Isaak has released 13 studio albums, toured extensively with his band Silvertone, and received numerous award nominations. His sound and image are often compared to those of Roy Orbison, Elvis Presley, Ricky Nelson, and Duane Eddy.

Isaak had associated with film director David Lynch, who used his music in numerous films. As an actor, he starred as Chester Desmond in Lynch's horror film Twin Peaks: Fire Walk with Me and has played supporting roles and bit parts in films such as Married to the Mob, The Silence of the Lambs, Little Buddha, That Thing You Do! and starred in two television series: the sitcom The Chris Isaak Show and the talk show The Chris Isaak Hour.

== Early life and education ==
Isaak was born in Stockton, California, to Dorothy (née Vignolo; 1931–2021) and Joseph Isaak (1929–2012), a forklift driver; they were of Italian and German ancestry, respectively.

Attending Amos Alonzo Stagg High School in Stockton, Isaak was class president and the class of 1974 valedictorian. He subsequently attended a local college, San Joaquin Delta Community College, before transferring to the University of the Pacific. He graduated with a bachelor's degree in English and communications arts in 1981 and participated in a Japanese exchange program.

After graduating from college, Isaak put together his first band, Silvertone, a rockabilly group with James Calvin Wilsey (guitar), Jamie Ayres (bass), and John Silvers (drums). Ayres and Silvers were later replaced by Rowland Salley (bass), and Kenney Dale Johnson (drums). The name was borrowed from the Silvertone guitar brand popularized in the 1950s. The group remained with Isaak as his permanent backing band.

== Career ==
=== Music career ===
In 1985, Isaak signed a contract with Warner Bros. Records and released his first album, Silvertone, to critical acclaim, including from John Fogerty. Despite being named after his band, Silvertone was mostly recorded with session musicians. The album's sound was raw and diverse, mingling country blues with conventional folk ballads. Although the album was a critical success, it failed to sell respectably. Two tracks from the album, "Gone Ridin'" and "Livin' for Your Lover", featured in David Lynch's 1986 film Blue Velvet.

Isaak's self-titled follow-up album was released in 1987 and reached the Billboard 200. The album saw Isaak hone his style to sophisticated R&B. The artwork for Chris Isaak was photographed by fashion photographer Bruce Weber. Three tracks from the album -- "You Owe Me Some Kind of Love", "Blue Hotel", and "Lie to Me" –- were used in Episode 5 of the 1987 TV series "Private Eye".

Warner Bros. moved Isaak to their Reprise Records label in 1988. That same year, "Suspicion of Love" by Isaak appeared in the film Married to the Mob.

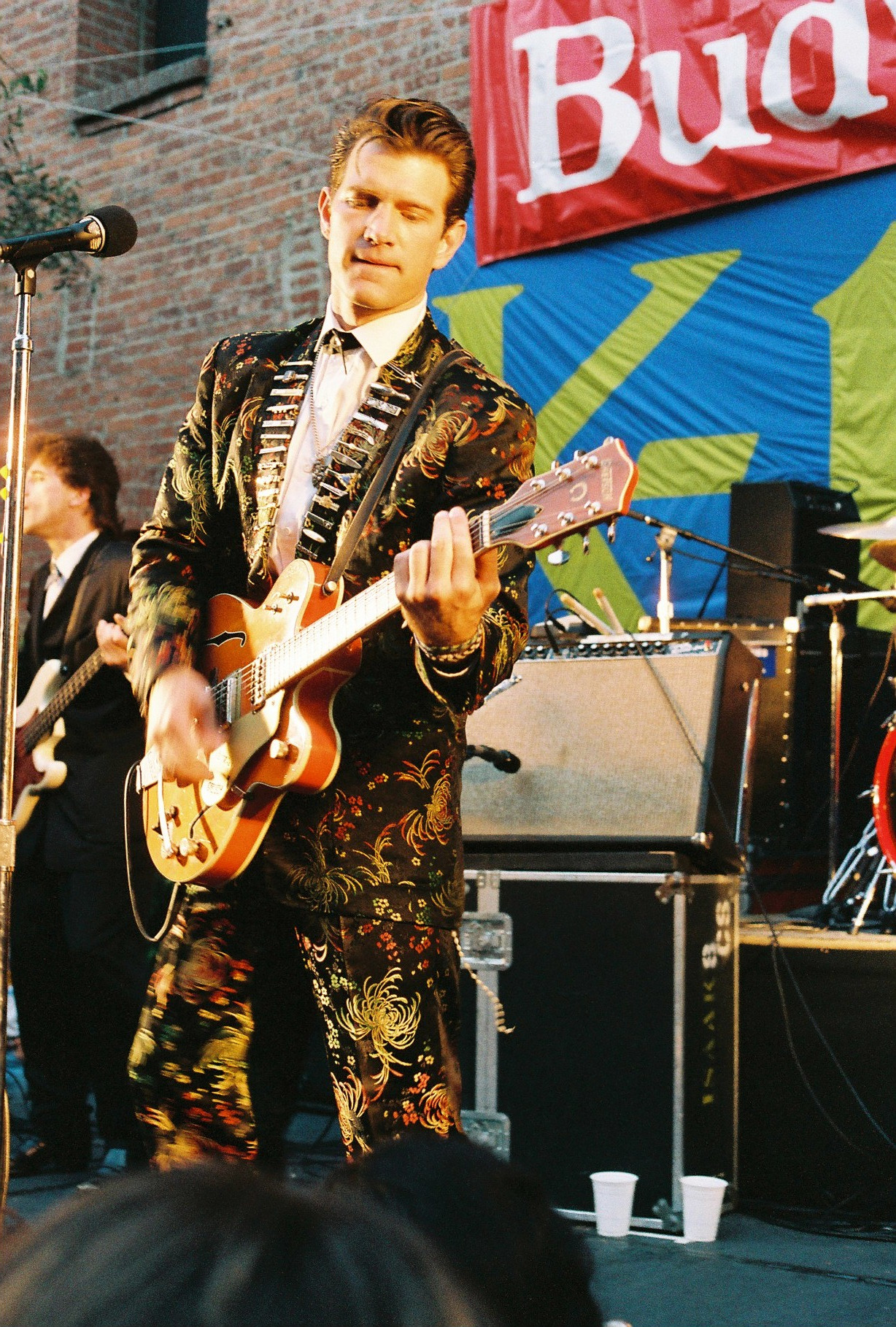
Isaak onstage in San Francisco, 1988

Isaak's best-known song is "Wicked Game". In an interview with Mark Needham, an engineer who worked with Isaak on "Wicked Game", Needham said that it took several years to put the track together. It was first released on the 1989 album Heart Shaped World, and an instrumental version of the song was subsequently featured in the 1990 David Lynch film Wild at Heart. Lee Chesnut, an Atlanta radio station music director who was obsessed with Lynch films, played the vocal version and it became the station's most-requested song. Chesnut spread the word to other radio stations and the single became a national top 10 hit in February 1991, peaking at number 6. It also reached No. 10 in the UK Singles Chart. The music video for the song was directed by Herb Ritts and was an MTV and VH1 hit; shot in black and white, it featured Isaak and supermodel Helena Christensen in a sensual encounter on the beach, caressing each other and whispering in each other's ears. Another less-seen version of "Wicked Game" is directed by David Lynch and comprises scenes from the film Wild at Heart.

"Two Hearts" from Isaak's fourth album, San Francisco Days, was featured in the closing credits of True Romance, a 1993 film directed by Tony Scott, written by Quentin Tarantino, and starring Christian Slater and Patricia Arquette.

In 1995, Isaak split with longtime guitarist James Calvin Wilsey. That year, he released Forever Blue, Isaak's fifth album, and the accompanying tour featured Hershel Yatovitz on guitar. The album was nominated for a Grammy for Best Rock Album, and the single "Somebody's Crying" was nominated for a Grammy for Best Male Rock Vocal Performance. On March 15, 1996, the album was certified Platinum by the RIAA. "Baby Did a Bad Bad Thing" was featured in Stanley Kubrick's final film, Eyes Wide Shut, in 1999. The music video for the song was directed by Herb Ritts (his second collaboration with Isaak); it was shot in color and featured Isaak and French supermodel Laetitia Casta in a motel room.

Isaak composed a theme song for U.S. late-night television variety-talk show The Late Late Show with Craig Kilborn.

The record producer Erik Jacobsen was instrumental in Isaak's sound for 15 years. Jacobsen is known for his production work with The Lovin' Spoonful, as well as on solo albums by Spoonful's John Sebastian and Jerry Yester. Isaak ceased working with Jacobsen on his 2002 album Always Got Tonight. "Life Will Go On" from this album was featured in Chasing Liberty, a 2004 film starring Mandy Moore and Matthew Goode.

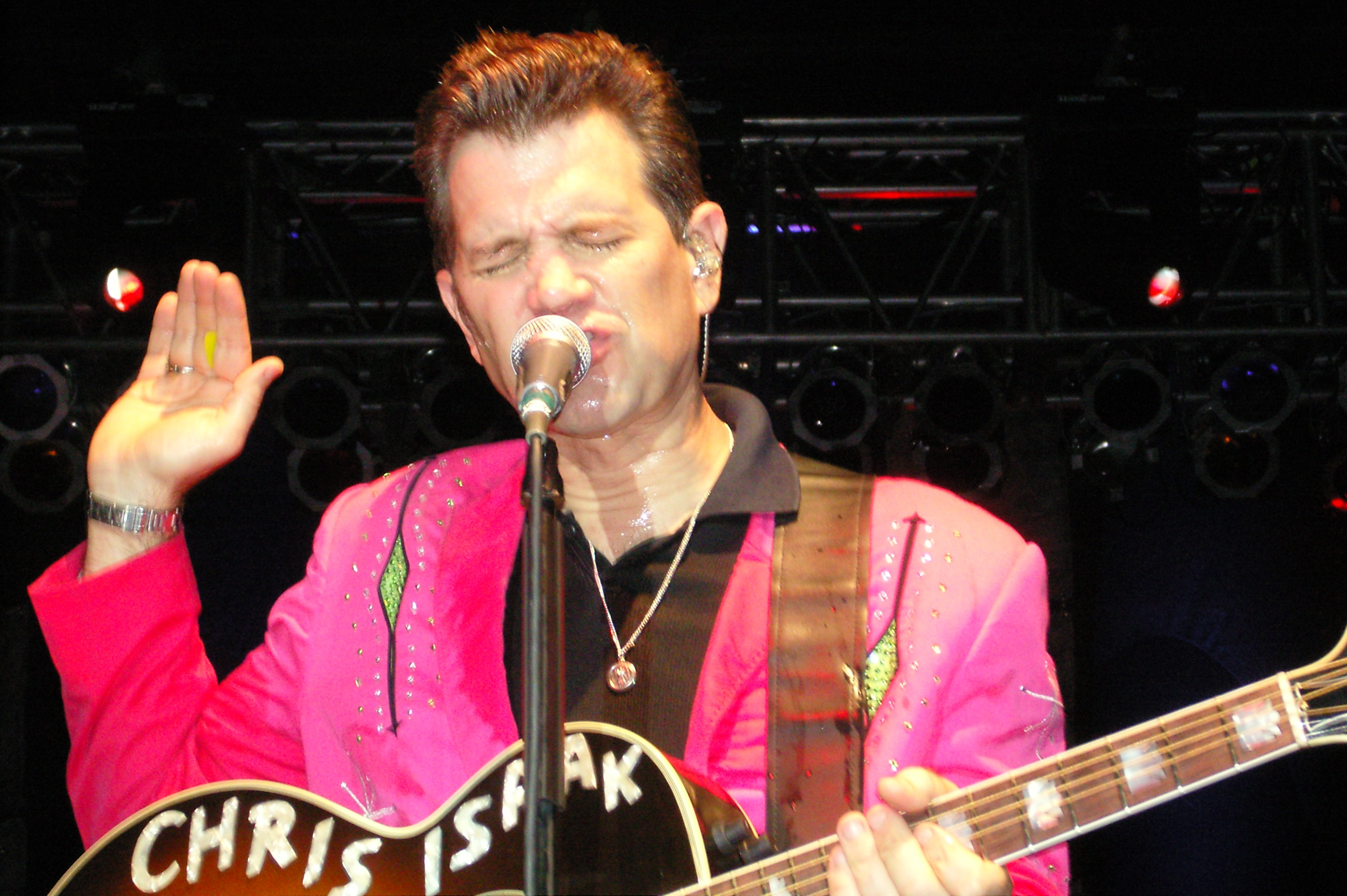
Isaak performing in 2006

In 2007, a live performance of Isaak singing Fats Domino's hit "Blueberry Hill" with Johnny Hallyday at La Cigale was released on Hallyday's live album La Cigale : 12-17 Décembre 2006. Also in 2007, Isaak opened for Stevie Nicks on the first leg of her Crystal Visions Tour.

For his 2009 album Mr. Lucky, Isaak collaborated with producer John Shanks.

Isaak contributed a cover of Buddy Holly's "Crying, Waiting, Hoping" for a tribute album, Listen to Me: Buddy Holly, released in September 2011. The next month, he released Beyond the Sun, an album of cover songs (except for one original) that was recorded in Memphis, Tennessee, at the Sun Records studio.

Isaak performed at the 2015 AFL Grand Final, along with English singer Ellie Goulding and Canadian musician Bryan Adams.

In 2016, Isaak undertook the "First Comes the Night Tour".

==== Guitars ====
Isaak said in a 2002 interview with Acoustic Guitar that he uses a one-of-a-kind Gibson:

For my electric, I've got a one-off Gibson version of a Gretsch 6120, a sort of Chet Atkins thing. They made one of these things and gave it to me to see if I liked it, and I liked it so much I've been playing it ever since. People told me they thought it was a White Falcon, but it's not. It's just a white Gibson. I don't think they ever manufactured any of the things. They strung up this one prototype, scratched their heads, and said, 'Huh. Give it to Isaak.'

Isaak also plays a Gibson J-200 acoustic guitar, which he uses for songwriting.

=== Acting and other work ===
In addition to his music, Isaak has acted in film and television — as a main character or more often in smaller roles. A few of his larger film roles included David Lynch's Twin Peaks: Fire Walk with Me in 1992 and in the 1993 Bernardo Bertolucci-directed Little Buddha, in which he starred alongside Bridget Fonda and Keanu Reeves. Other motion pictures roles included Married to the Mob (1988), The Silence of the Lambs (1991), That Thing You Do! (1996), A Dirty Shame (2004), and The Informers (2008).

Isaak guest-starred in the special Super Bowl XXX edition of the television sitcom Friends ("The One After the Superbowl, Part One") in 1996, and in 1998 he co-starred in the HBO miniseries From the Earth to the Moon as astronaut Ed White, who was the first American astronaut to do a spacewalk and who died in the 1967 Apollo 1 fire.

From March 2001 to March 2004, Isaak starred in his own television show, The Chris Isaak Show. It aired in the United States on the cable television network Showtime. This adult sitcom featured Isaak and his band playing themselves, and the episode plots were based on fictional accounts of the backstage world of Isaak—the rock star next door.

In 2009, The Biography Channel aired The Chris Isaak Hour, a one-hour music interview and performance show hosted by Isaak. The series premiere featured Trisha Yearwood and included their first-ever performance of "Breaking Apart", a song from Isaak's 1998 album Speak of the Devil that the two recorded as a duet for his 2009 album Mr. Lucky. The guests on the remaining seven episodes of the series were: Stevie Nicks, Glen Campbell, Michael Bublé, Chicago, The Smashing Pumpkins, Yusuf Islam, and Jewel.

In April 2010, Isaak was the special guest during Conan O'Brien's The Legally Prohibited from Being Funny on Television Tour performance at the Nob Hill Masonic Center in San Francisco, California.

On September 29, 2011, Isaak received the Stockton Arts Commission STAR Award in his hometown of Stockton, California.

In 2014, Isaak voiced the character of Enoch, the apparent ruler of the town of Pottsfield, in the second episode of the animated television miniseries Over the Garden Wall.

On May 3, 2015, Isaak was confirmed to be replacing Natalie Bassingthwaighte as a judge on the seventh season of The X Factor Australia. He joined James Blunt and returning judges Guy Sebastian and Dannii Minogue. He mentored the 'Boys' category, which included the season winner, Cyrus Villanueva.

== Personal life ==
Isaak is close friends with Stevie Nicks and was a close friend of the film director David Lynch.

Isaak is a lifelong bachelor. Regarding his bachelor status, Isaak stated,

The longest relationship I've been in is with my band. My personal relationships have never lasted because my work was always number one. It's not that I never thought about marriage and kids, but I was either busy writing and recording music, acting, or on the road. Kids are like sail boats: they look good on a sunny day and in the distance, but require a lot of maintenance.

Isaak enjoys drawing and exploring salvage shops and secondhand stores.

=== Controversies ===
==== 1995 MTV Movie Awards ====
At the 1995 MTV Movie Awards, while presenting the "Best Kiss" award along with Cameron Diaz to Lauren Holly and Jim Carrey for Dumb & Dumber, Isaak repeatedly attempted to force a kiss onto Diaz multiple times, which she clearly rejected. Upon stepping onto the stage, Carrey quickly kissed an unprepared Isaak, which Isaak did not appear to appreciate. Isaak addressed the incident in 2026 saying "We were giving out the award for best kiss. I was told, 'Go out there and give her a kiss.' It was meant to be a comedy moment. But nobody had told Cameron and she did not want to be kissed. I felt awful. If people think that's how I behave … no, that's not me."

==== 2013 lawsuit ====
Isaak was sued in 2013 by a longtime lighting director, Lane Hirsch, who alleged that he was the victim of repeated homophobic abuse by roadies and witnessed the mistreatment of women who also worked on Isaak's tours. The lawsuit was filed on the basis of discrimination, wrongful firing, and defamation, among other charges. The suit was resolved later that year after an "Offer to Compromise" was filed, leading to a voluntary dismissal of all claims.

== Discography ==
- Silvertone (1985)
- Chris Isaak (1987)
- Heart Shaped World (1989)
- San Francisco Days (1993)
- Forever Blue (1995)
- Baja Sessions (1996)
- Speak of the Devil (1998)
- Always Got Tonight (2002)
- Christmas (2004)
- Mr. Lucky (2009)
- Beyond the Sun (2011)
- First Comes the Night (2015)
- Everybody Knows It's Christmas (2022)

== Filmography ==
=== Film ===
- Married to the Mob – "The Clown" (1988)
- The Silence of the Lambs – SWAT Commander (1991)
- Twin Peaks: Fire Walk with Me – Special Agent Chester Desmond (1992)
- Little Buddha – Dean Conrad (1993)
- That Thing You Do! – Uncle Bob (1996)
- Grace of My Heart - Mathew Lewis (1996)
- Blue Ridge Fall (aka End of Innocence) - Sheriff (1999)
- A Dirty Shame – Vaughn Stickles (2004)
- The Informers – Les (2008)

=== Television ===
- Wiseguy – Berated lounge singer (1987)
- The Larry Sanders Show - Himself (season 4, episode 6, 1995 - The P.A.)
- Friends – Rob Donnan (season 2, episode 12, 1996 – "The One After the Superbowl")
- From the Earth to the Moon – Astronaut Edward White II (1998)
- Melrose Place – Himself/musical guest (season 7, episode 28, 1998 – Ryan's Choice)
- The Greatest – Himself/host (100 Greatest Videos, 2001)
- The Late Late Show with Craig Kilborn – Himself (season 3, episode 40, June 29, 2001)
- The Greatest – Himself (50 Sexiest Video Moments, 2003)
- Ed – Jamie Decker (season 3, episode 20, 2003 – "Second Chances")
- The Chris Isaak Show – Himself (2001–2004)
- American Dreams – Roy Orbison (season 2, episode 14, 2004 – "Old Enough to Fight")
- The Footy Show – Himself (Grand Final, 2004)
- The Late Late Show with Craig Ferguson – Michael Caine in Space (season 2, episode 177, 2006)
- Great Performances Jerry Lee Lewis: Last Man Standing Live – Himself (2007)
- The Bill Engvall Show – Himself (season 1, episode 6, 2007)
- Australian Idol – Himself (season 6, November 9–10, 2008)
- The Chris Isaak Hour – Himself/host (2009)
- George Stroumboulopoulos Tonight – Himself (season 2, episode 23, 2011)
- Conan – Himself (episode 192, January 4, 2012)
- Loose Women – Himself (September 28, 2012)
- The Tonight Show – Himself (January 13, 2014)
- Hot in Cleveland – Chase Jackson (one episode, 2014)
- Over the Garden Wall – Enoch (voice) (one episode, 2014)
- Adventure Time – 7718 (voice) (one episode, 2015)
- The X Factor Australia – Himself – Judge/Mentor (2015)
- Sheriff Callie's Wild West – Johnny Strum (voice) (season 2, 2016)

=== Music video ===
- Elton John – "Sacrifice" – Man (1989)

== Awards and nominations ==
Year	Awards	Work	Category	Result
1985	MTV Video Music Awards	"Dancin'"	Most Experimental Video	Nominated
1985	MTV Video Music Awards	"Dancin'"	Best Direction in a Video	Nominated
1991	MTV Video Music Awards	"Wicked Game"	Video of the Year	Nominated
1991	MTV Video Music Awards	"Wicked Game"	Best Direction in a Video	Nominated
1991	MTV Video Music Awards	"Wicked Game"	Viewer's Choice	Nominated
1991	MTV Video Music Awards	"Wicked Game"	Best Editing in a Video	Nominated
1991	MTV Video Music Awards	"Wicked Game"	Best Male Video	Won
1991	MTV Video Music Awards	"Wicked Game"	Best Cinematography in a Video	Won
1991	MTV Video Music Awards	"Wicked Game"	Best Video from a Film	Won
1991	Pollstar Concert Industry Awards	Tour	Small Hall Tour of the Year	Nominated
1992	ASCAP Pop Music Awards	"Wicked Game"	Most Performed Song	Won
1992	Brit Awards	Himself	Best International Breakthrough	Nominated
1995	Music Television Awards	Himself	Best Male	Nominated
1995	Razzie Awards	Little Buddha	Worst New Star	Nominated
1995	MTV Video Music Awards	"Somebody's Crying"	Best Male Video	Nominated
1996	Grammy Awards	"Somebody's Crying"	Best Male Rock Vocal Performance	Nominated
1996	Grammy Awards	Forever Blue	Best Rock Album	Nominated
1996	California Music Awards	Forever Blue	Outstanding Album	Won
1996	California Music Awards	Himself	Outstanding Male Vocalist	Won
1996	California Music Awards	Himself	Bay Area Musician of the Year	Won
1996	California Music Awards	Himself & Silvertone	Outstanding Group	Won
1999	California Music Awards	Himself	Outstanding Male Vocalist	Nominated
1999	MVPA Awards	"Please"	Best Adult Contemporary Video	Nominated
2000	Online Film & Television Association Awards	"Baby Did a Bad Bad Thing"	Best Adapted Song	Nominated
2001	Television Critics' Association Awards	The Chris Isaak Show	Individual Achievement in Comedy	Nominated
2003	MVPA Awards	"Wicked Game"	MVPA Hall of Fame	Won
2004	ASCAP Film & TV Awards	"Wicked Game"	Most Performed Theme	Won
2022	Americana Music Honors & Awards	Himself	Lifetime Achievement Award for Performance	Won

== See also ==
- List of American Grammy Award winners and nominees
