= Runt Distribution =

Runt Distribution is an American record company that owns the a number of record labels, mainly reissue labels.

- 4 Men With Beards - a vinyl reissue label
- DBK Works - a reissues and new music label on CD and LP
- Plain Recordings - CD and LP reissues of 1980s and later indie-rock and alternative music
- Water - CD reissue label specializing in obscure music worldwide
- Smithsonian Folkways - vinyl reissues
- Sutro Park - vinyl reissues of classic and contemporary music

Runt also partners with the UK indie label Fire Records to release albums on vinyl in North America.

== DBK Works artists ==
DBK artists are:

- Absolute Grey
- Afrika Bambaataa
- Air
- Eric Andersen
- Archie Bell & the Drells
- Terry Callier
- Canned Heat
- James Chance
- Guy Clark
- Patsy Cline
- The Cuts
- Barbara Dane and The Chambers Brothers
- Dr. John
- Epic Soundtracks
- The Fabulous Counts
- Flamin' Groovies
- Grandmaster Flash
- Grandmaster Flash and the Furious Five
- David Grisman / Peter Rowan / Clarence White / Richard Greene
- Doug with Caroleen Beatty Hilsinger
- The Happy Eggs
- Jolie Holland
- Penelope Houston
- Waylon Jennings
- Antonio Carlos Jobim
- Elton John
- Pat Johnson
- Ben E. King
- Tami Lynn
- Thomas Mapfumo
- Bob Marley
- The Memphis Horns
- Mink DeVille
- Tracy Nelson
- Willie Nelson
- Buck Owens
- Wilson Pickett
- The Rezillos
- Mitch Ryder
- Percy Sledge
- The Sugarhill Gang
- Ike Turner and Tina Turner
- Patty Waters
- Mary Wells
- Tony Joe White
- Steve Wynn
