= Rowland Salley =

American musician

Roly Salley
- Born: Rowland Salley; November 2, 1949 (age 76); Belvidere, Illinois, U.S.
- Genres: Rock, rock n' roll, roots rock
- Occupation: Musician
- Instruments: Vocals, guitar, bass guitar
- Website: rowlandsalley.com

Rowland Salley (born November 2, 1949) is an American musician, sometimes called Roly Salley. He is a bass guitarist and vocalist for Chris Isaak's band Silvertone. His best-known tune is "Killing the Blues", which has been covered by John Prine, Chris Smither, Shawn Colvin, Robert Plant and Alison Krauss, Shooter Jennings and Billy Ray Cyrus, Lo-Fang and Sean Keane. As a band member for Chris Isaak, he was a regular on The Chris Isaak Show.

Salley is also a painter.

== Biography ==
Salley was born in Belvidere, Illinois. He began playing bass in high school and was kicked off the track team for having long hair. He has written, "the timing of events is what often moves somebody. One of those events came for me in the form of a monster tornado that hit our high school one sunny Friday afternoon in the springtime [April 21, 1967]. There was death and destruction and though I wasn't consciously trying to flee the place or the characters of my town... there was a lot that I wanted to try in my lifetime... [and] I ought to set about it before another "tornado" came along."

His first move was to Madison, Wisconsin, where he started a band. He then moved to Woodstock, New York. He got work as a session musician working with such performers as Maria Muldaur, John Sebastian and Paul Butterfield. His best known composition, "Killing the Blues", was first recorded by the group "Woodstock Mountains" on the LP More Music from Mud Acres (1977). This loose group included Salley, Butterfield, Sebastian, Bill Keith, Happy Traum, and others. Salley later moved to Toronto where he played with such performers as David Wilcox and Ian and Sylvia. Later, he moved to Los Angeles where he backed up such singers as Bobbie Gentry and Joan Baez. He moved to San Francisco in 1983. Two years later, he met Chris Isaak and has performed with the Silvertones ever since.

Salley's solo album Killing the Blues was recorded on weekends in Vancouver during breaks in filming The Chris Isaak Show in 2004. The album is a mix of new and old material, dating as far back as 1977 (the title song). After Shawn Colvin recorded "Killing the Blues" in 1994 she wrote, "Larry Campbell from New York told me in 1981 while we were in a band together that I should learn this song by his friend, Roly Salley. Just when you think there's no new way to say anything, you hear a song like this and think, that's as good as anything before or since."

Of the songwriting process, Salley has written, "the part I like best about writing is the second you realize that you've just written a song." He markets reproductions of his art through his website and has contributed his art to three of Maria Muldaur's albums.

=== Why the Artist Creates ===
In 1998, Salley co-directed a short documentary film about himself called Why the Artist Creates. The 24-minute film premiered on PBS station KQED-TV in San Francisco and is described as a celebration of music, art, and the creative choices we all make. It won a national Silver Telly award, was an Emmy nominee, and a Columbus International Film Festival honoree. It was produced by Luanne Bole-Becker, who met Salley at a 1993 Chris Isaak concert. In the months that followed, they explored through correspondence why Salley chose to be a musician and painter. In this documentary based on their letters, Bole-Becker and Salley collaborate with film and video artists, merging original music and visuals into a human interest story honoring the creative spirit.

=== "Killing the Blues" ===
During the Academy Awards ceremony airing on US television in 2008, the retailer JC Penney aired a commercial featuring the newly covered version of "Killing the Blues" sung by Alison Krauss and Robert Plant. This version was listed as No. 51 on Rolling Stone's list of the 100 Best Songs of 2007. It later earned a Grammy Award for Best Country Collaboration with Vocals in February 2009.

== Discography ==
- Killing the Blues (2005)

== DVDs ==
- Learning Electric Bass (how-to, 1984)

== VHS ==
- Why the Artist Creates (April 1, 1998)
