= Penelope Houston =

American singer-songwriter (born 1958)

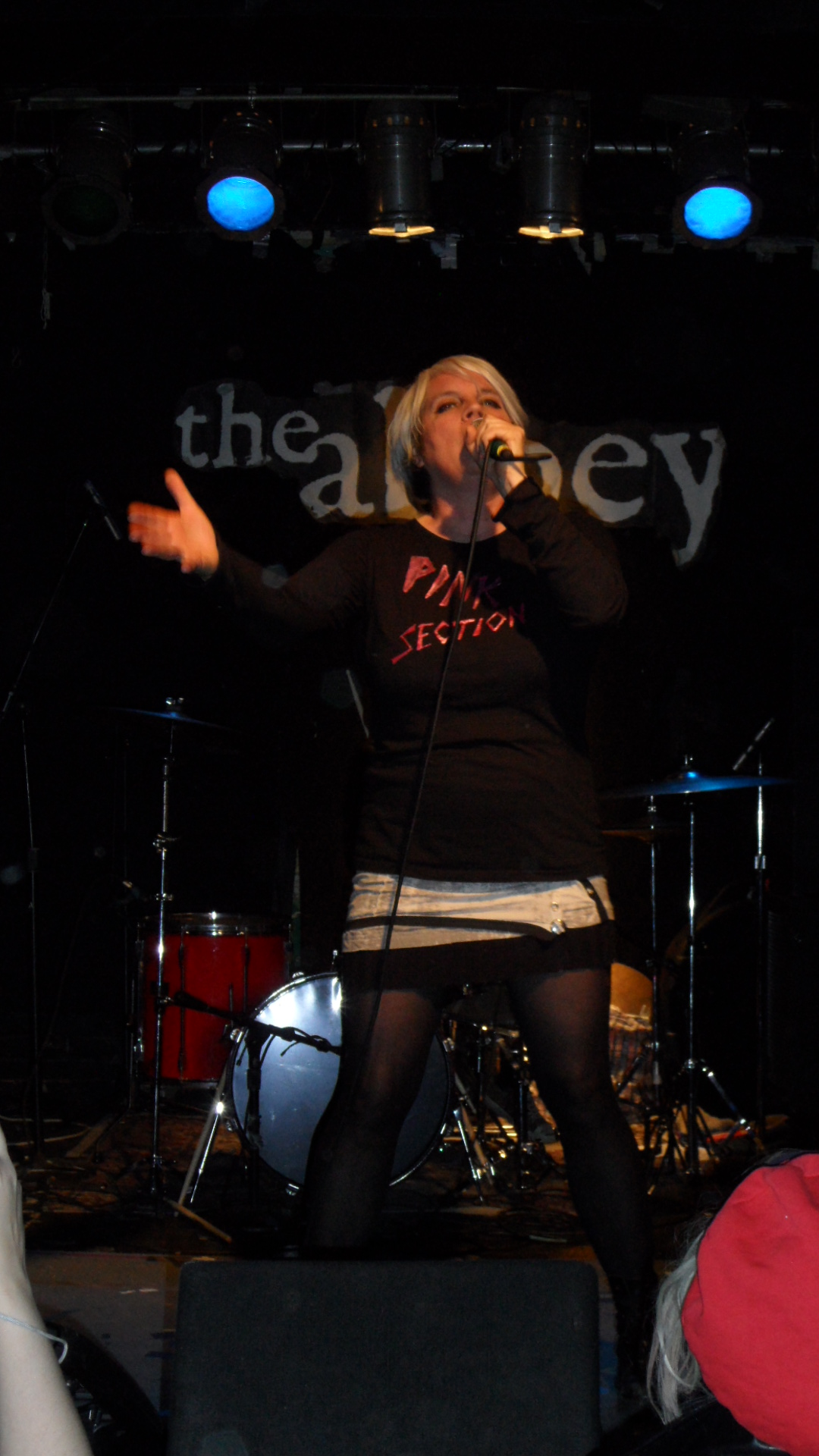
- Chicago 10/28/2012

Background information
- Born: December 17, 1958 (age 67); Los Angeles, California, United States
- Genres: Punk rock; folk
- Occupation: Singer
- Instrument: Vocals
- Years active: 1977–present
- Labels: Subterranean

Penelope Houston (born December 17, 1958) is an American singer-songwriter best known as the singer for the San Francisco-based punk rock band the Avengers. She was raised in Seattle. In the mid-1970s she attended Fairhaven College in Bellingham, Washington. In 1977, Houston moved to San Francisco, attended the San Francisco Art Institute, and shortly after became the lead singer and songwriter for the Avengers. That band released one album, their eponymous debut in 1983.

Following the group's demise in 1979, Houston moved first to Los Angeles to work in film and video with The Screamers and director Rene Daalder, then to England where she collaborated with Howard Devoto on his post-Magazine projects. In the mid-1980s, she returned to San Francisco and helped originate the West Coast neo-folk movement. In 1986, she was featured alongside Tomata du Plenty of The Screamers in the punk rock musical Population: 1. By 1996 she had toured Europe extensively, signed with WEA Germany (Warner Brothers) and earned numerous awards with the dozen albums, which blended influences of punk, folk, rock, blues and Americana into her dark unique acoustic sound.

Her first full-length album was Birdboys which came out in 1987. Her most recent album is 2012's On Market Street.

Shortly after the release of Pale Green Girl, Houston and original guitarist Greg Ingraham recreated the Avengers, adding bassist Joel Reader (formerly of The Mr. T Experience, and The Plus Ones) and drummer Luis Illades (of Pansy Division, formerly also of The Plus Ones) to round out the lineup. Since the spring of 2004 she has toured the U.S. and Europe with this lineup. She continues to play her solo material, mainly in the San Francisco Bay Area.

In August 2012, Houston conducted an audio interview with Music Life Radio.

== Discography ==
Title	Year	Notes	Label
Birdboys	1987	Acoustic album	Subterranean Records
On Borrowed Time	1990	live album	id Records
500 Lucky Pieces	1991	Limited release of 500 copies	id Records
The Whole World	1993		Heyday Records
Silk Purse	1993	Limited release	Return to Sender
Karmal Apple	1994		Normal Records
Crazy Baby	1994	Limited release	Return to Sender
Cut You	1996		WEA Records
Tongue	1998		WEA Records
Once In A Blue Moon	2000	Compilation/demos	penelope.net records
Loners, Stoners, and Prison Brides	2001	Live album	Return To Sender
Eighteen Stories Down	2003	Best Of	WEA Records
The Pale Green Girl	2004		DBKWorks
On Market Street	2012		Devout Ruins
