= Metal Mike Saunders =

American musician

Michael Earl Saunders
- Born: May 1, 1952 (age 74); Little Rock, Arkansas, U.S.
- Education: University of Texas at Austin (B.S. in Statistics); University of Arkansas at Little Rock (B.S. in Accounting)
- Occupations: Musician, accountant, rock critic
- Presenting career
- Style: Rock music, punk rock, hardcore punk
- Country: United States

Michael Earl Saunders (born May 1, 1952), commonly known as Metal Mike Saunders, is an American rock critic and the singer of the Californian punk band Angry Samoans. He is credited with coining the music genre label "heavy metal" in a record review for Humble Pie's As Safe as Yesterday Is in the November 12, 1970 issue of Rolling Stone. (The original text is shown in the VH1 Classic documentary Heavy: The Story of Metal from 2007.) Six months later in 1971, he used the phrase again while reviewing Sir Lord Baltimore's first album, Kingdom Come, in the pages of Creem magazine.

== Biography ==
Saunders was born and grew up in Little Rock, Arkansas. He graduated from the University of Texas at Austin in 1973 with a degree in statistics; eventually he received another bachelor's degree in accounting from the University of Arkansas at Little Rock. Saunders kept his day job as an accountant throughout his years as lead singer and guitarist for the Angry Samoans.

Saunders' political incorrectness and personal attacks in his lyrics earned him (and the Angry Samoans) significant notoriety in the early 1980s, especially due to their song "Get Off the Air", an ad hominem attack upon well-known KROQ-FM DJ Rodney Bingenheimer.

Saunders played drums in these bands:

- VOM – Los Angeles, 1977–78 (with Richard Meltzer and future Angry Samoan Gregg Turner)
- Fried Abortions – San Francisco, 1980–82 (changed two members and their name to Lennonburger)
- Lennonburger – San Francisco, 1983–84 (with Maximumrocknroll's Jeff Bale on lead vocals)
- Electric Koels – San Francisco, 1985–88 (1960s retro-garage band with five original songs and 55 cover tunes)

Saunders also drummed on all the "Metal Mike" CDs usually missing from Angry Samoans discographies.

Although he maintains that "drums are my best instrument", Saunders has written over 1,000 rock songs in his lifetime, all methodically recorded to mono on old-fashioned Sony portable kitchen-table cassette recorders.

== Discography ==
As Metal Mike, he recorded:

- Plays the Hits of the 90's (CD EP, 1991)
- Ted Nugent Is Not My Dad (CD EP, 1992)
- My Girlfriend Is a Rock (CD EP, 1993)
- Next Stop Nowhere (CD 22-song compilation, 1994)
- Surf City or Bust (CD, 1999; features 20 tracks including the previously unreleased 1969 The Rockin' Blewz album I'm a Roadrunner Motherfucka)
- A cover of "I Remember You" on Gabba Gabba Hey: A Tribute to the Ramones (CD, 1991)
