= Chris Isaak discography =

Musical recordings by Chris Isaak

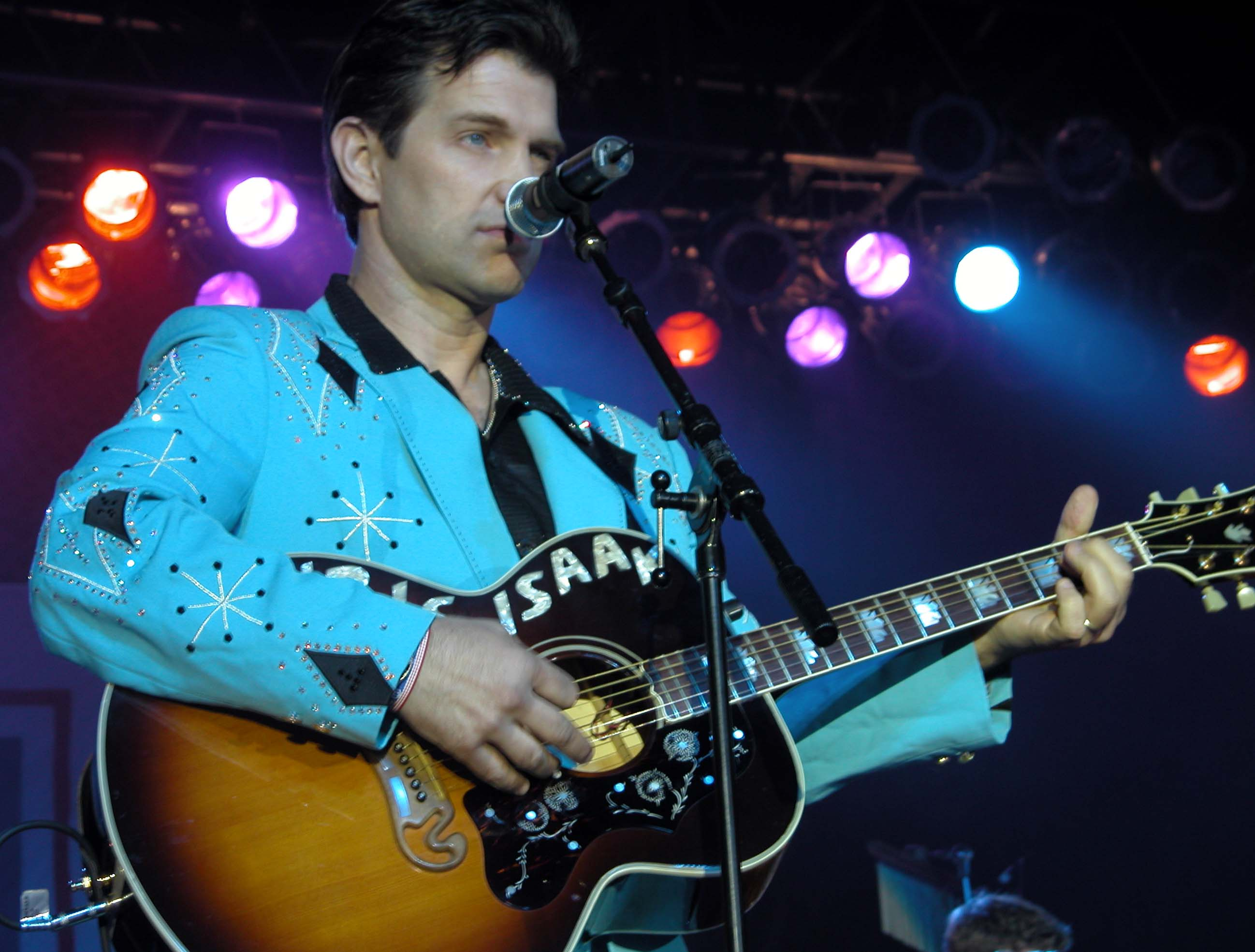
- Studio albums: 13
- Live albums: 6
- Compilation albums: 3
- Singles: 42
- Music videos: 23

Discography of American rock and roll singer Chris Isaak.

== Albums ==
=== Studio albums ===
Year	Album details	Peak chart positions									Certifications (sales threshold)
Year	Album details	US	AUS	FRA	GER	NL	NZ	NO	SWE	UK	Certifications (sales threshold)
1985	Silvertone: Released: January 10, 1985; Label: Warner Bros.	—	77	—	—	—	—	—	—	—	
1987	Chris Isaak: Released: March 10, 1987; Label: Warner Bros.	194	148	13	—	33	—	20	20	—	ARIA: Gold
1989	Heart Shaped World: Released: June 13, 1989; Label: Reprise	7	117	—	—	50	—	—	—	—	RIAA: 2× Platinum; MC: Platinum
1993	San Francisco Days: Released: April 13, 1993; Label: Reprise	35	20	17	46	14	15	7	32	12	RIAA: Gold; ARIA: Gold; BPI: Silver; MC: Gold
1995	Forever Blue: Released: May 23, 1995; Label: Reprise	31	2	19	55	46	7	31	9	27	RIAA: Platinum; ARIA: 3× Platinum; MC: Gold
1996	Baja Sessions: Released: October 8, 1996; Label: Reprise	33	8	43	—	—	11	—	38	100	RIAA: Gold; ARIA: Gold
1998	Speak of the Devil: Released: September 22, 1998; Label: Reprise	41	11	34	99	—	19	37	39	108	ARIA: Platinum
2002	Always Got Tonight: Released: February 12, 2002; Label: Reprise	24	12	120	61	—	12	—	45	155	ARIA: Gold
2004	Christmas: Released: October 12, 2004; Label: Reprise	109	26	—	—	—	—	—	56	—	
2009	Mr. Lucky: Released: February 24, 2009; Label: Wicked Game/Reprise	29	11	34	—	—	—	—	22	—	
2011	Beyond the Sun: Released: October 18, 2011; Label: Wicked Game/Vanguard	34	3	38	—	69	23	—	40	6	ARIA: Gold; BPI: Silver
2015	First Comes the Night: Released: October 23, 2015; Label: Wicked Game/Vanguard	66	2	186	—	—	—	—	—	32	
2022	Everybody Knows It's Christmas: Released: October 14, 2022; Label: Wicked Game/Sun Records	—	—	—	—	—	—	—	—	—	
"—" denotes the album failed to chart or not released to that country

=== Live albums ===
Year	Album details	US Ind.	AUS	Certifications
1995	Live from Bimbo's 365 Club in San Francisco: Released: 1995; Recorded in 1995; Label: Reprise	—	—	
2004	Christmas: Released: 2004; Label: HD Ready, LLC	—	29	
2005	Soundstage Presents Chris Isaak: Released: July 2005; Label: RA	—	14	ARIA: Platinum
2008	Live in Australia: Released: October 17, 2008; Label: Universal Music	—	17	
2010	Live at the Fillmore: Released: June 15, 2010; Label: Mailboat	44	—	
2017	Mr. Lucky in Spain: Released: April 4, 2017; Label: Coqueiro Verde Records	—	—	
"—" denotes the album failed to chart or not released to that country

=== Compilation albums ===
Year	Album details	Peak chart positions								Certifications (sales threshold)
Year	Album details	US	AUS	GER	NL	NZ	NO	SWE	UK	Certifications (sales threshold)
1991	Wicked Game: Released: 1991; Label: Reprise	—	8	3	3	3	6	2	3	ARIA: 3× Platinum; BPI: 2× Platinum; BVMI: Gold; GLF: Gold
2000	3 for One: Released: May 9, 2000; Label: WEA International	—	—	—	—	—	—	—	—	
2006	Best of Chris Isaak: Released: May 9, 2006; Label: Reprise	54	1	44	—	2	27	—	65	ARIA: 3× Platinum
"—" denotes the album failed to chart or not released to that country

== Singles ==
Year	Single	Peak chart positions											Album
Year	Single	US	US Alt	US AC	US AAA	AUS	FRA	GER	NL	NZ	SWE	UK	Album
1985	"Dancin'"	—	—	—	—	46	—	—	—	—	—	—	Silvertone
1985	"Gone Ridin'"	—	—	—	—	—	—	—	—	—	—	—	Silvertone
1986	"Livin' for Your Lover"	—	—	—	—	—	—	—	50	—	—	—	Silvertone
1987	"You Owe Me Some Kind of Love"	—	—	—	—	—	—	—	—	—	—	—	Chris Isaak
1987	"Blue Hotel"	—	—	—	—	—	28	—	42	—	—	100	Chris Isaak
1987	"Lie to Me"	—	—	—	—	—	—	—	48	—	—	—	Chris Isaak
1987	"Heart Full of Soul"	—	—	—	—	—	—	—	—	—	—	—	Chris Isaak
1989	"Don't Make Me Dream About You"	—	18	—	—	—	—	—	—	—	—	—	Heart Shaped World
1990	"Wicked Game"	6	2	12	—	15	42	9	5	7	3	10	Heart Shaped World [US]/ Wicked Game [International]
1991	"Blue Spanish Sky"	—	—	—	—	—	—	—	—	—	—	—	Heart Shaped World [US]/ Wicked Game [International]
1991	"Blue Hotel" (re-release)	—	—	—	—	23	—	19	—	39	38	17	Wicked Game
1991	"Lie to Me" (re-release)	—	—	—	—	—	—	—	35	—	—	—	Wicked Game
1991	"Dancin'" (re-release)	—	—	—	—	151	—	—	64	—	—	92	Wicked Game
1993	"Can't Do a Thing (to Stop Me)"	— (Note: "Can't Do a Thing (to Stop Me)" did not enter the Billboard Hot 100, but peaked at number 5 on the Bubbling Under Hot 100 Singles chart.)	7	11	—	73	—	—	—	—	—	36	San Francisco Days
1993	"San Francisco Days"	—	—	—	—	125	—	—	—	—	—	62	San Francisco Days
1993	"Solitary Man"	—	—	—	—	127	—	—	—	—	—	85	San Francisco Days
1993	"Two Hearts"	—	—	—	—	—	—	—	—	—	—	—	San Francisco Days
1993	"Dark Moon"	—	—	—	—	—	—	—	—	—	—	—	A Perfect World (soundtrack)
1995	"Somebody's Crying"	45	34	27	—	5	—	76	—	22	—	81	Forever Blue
1995	"Baby Did a Bad, Bad Thing"	—	—	—	—	27	—	—	—	—	—	—	Forever Blue
1995	"Go Walking Down There"	— (Note: "Go Walking Down There" did not enter the Billboard Hot 100, but peaked at number 2 on the Bubbling Under Hot 100 Singles chart.)	32	—	10	55	—	—	—	—	—	—	Forever Blue
1996	"Graduation Day"	—	—	—	—	—	—	—	—	—	—	—	Forever Blue/Beautiful Girls (soundtrack)
1996	"Think of Tomorrow"	—	—	—	7	82	—	—	—	—	—	—	Baja Sessions
1996	"Dancin'" (1996 version)	—	—	—	—	—	—	—	—	—	—	—	Baja Sessions
1997	"Only the Lonely" (Australia only)	—	—	—	—	131	—	—	—	—	—	—	Baja Sessions
1998	"Flying"	—	—	—	6	—	—	—	—	—	—	—	Speak of the Devil
1998	"Please"	—	—	—	1	118	—	—	—	—	—	76	Speak of the Devil
1999	"Baby Did a Bad, Bad Thing" (re-release)	— (Note: "Baby Did a Bad, Bad Thing" did not enter the Billboard Hot 100, but peaked at number 25 on the Bubbling Under Hot 100 Singles chart.)	—	—	3	9	—	—	—	—	—	44	Eyes Wide Shut (soundtrack)
2002	"Let Me Down Easy"	— (Note: "Let Me Down Easy" did not enter the Billboard Hot 100, but peaked at number 24 on the Bubbling Under Hot 100 Singles chart.)	—	18	1	99	—	—	—	28	—	—	Always Got Tonight
2002	"One Day"	—	—	—	10	—	—	—	—	—	—	—	Always Got Tonight
2004	"Santa Claus Is Coming to Town" (with Stevie Nicks)	—	—	25	—	—	—	—	—	—	—	—	Christmas
2006	"King Without a Castle"	—	—	—	9	—	—	—	—	—	—	—	Best of Chris Isaak
2006	"Let's Have a Party"	—	—	—	—	—	—	—	—	—	—	—	Best of Chris Isaak
2006	"I Want You to Want Me"	—	—	—	—	—	—	—	—	—	—	—	Best of Chris Isaak
2007	"Blueberry Hill (Live)" (with Johnny Hallyday)	—	—	—	—	—	—	—	—	—	—	—	La Cigale (Johnny Hallyday)
2009	"We Let Her Down"	—	—	5	5	—	—	—	—	—	—	—	Mr. Lucky
2009	"You Don't Cry Like I Do"	—	—	—	—	—	—	—	—	—	—	—	Mr. Lucky
2009	"Breaking Apart" (with Trisha Yearwood)	—	—	—	—	—	—	—	—	—	—	—	Mr. Lucky
2010	"Wicked Game" (re-release)	—	—	—	—	—	—	—	—	—	54	48	Best of Chris Isaak
2011	"Live It Up"	—	—	—	—	—	—	—	—	—	—	—	Beyond the Sun
2015	"Please Don't Call"	—	—	—	—	—	—	—	—	—	—	—	First Comes the Night
2021	"Pandemic Blues: I Can't Take It"	—	—	—	—	—	—	—	—	—	—	—	
"—" denotes the single failed to chart or not released to that country

== Other appearances ==
Year	Album details	Track
1988	Married to the Mob: Released: 1988; Label: Reprise	"Suspicion of Love"
1994	It's Now or Never: The Tribute to Elvis: Released: 1994; Label: Mercury	"Blue Moon"
2001	Good Rockin' Tonight (The Legacy of Sun Records): Released: November 27, 2001; Label: London	"It Wouldn't Be the Same Without You"
2005	Genius & Friends: Released: September 20, 2005; Label: Rhino	Duet with Ray Charles on "You Are My Sunshine"
2006	La Cigale: Released: December 2006; Label: Warner Bros.	Duet with Johnny Hallyday on "Blueberry Hill"
2011	Listen to Me: Buddy Holly: Released: September 6, 2011; Label: Verve Forecast	"Crying, Waiting, Hoping"

== Music videos ==
List of music videos, showing year released and directors
Title	Year	Director
"Dancin'"	1984	Mary Lambert
"Gone Ridin'"	1985	Theodorus Bafaloukos
"You Owe Me Some Kind of Love"	1987	Jean-Baptiste Mondino
"Blue Hotel" (Version 1)	1987	Mark LeBon
"Blue Hotel" (Version 2)	1987	
"Don't Make Me Dream About You"	1989	Geoffrey Barish
"Wicked Game" (Version 1)	1990	David Lynch
"Wicked Game" (Version 2)	1991	Herb Ritts
"Blue Spanish Sky"	1991	Bruce Weber
"Can't Do a Thing (to Stop Me)"	1993	Michael Haussman
"San Francisco Days"	1993	Gus Van Sant
"Solitary Man"	1993	Larry Clark
"Two Hearts"	1993	Yuri Neyman
"Dark Moon"	1994	Nicola Pecorini
"Somebody's Crying"	1995	Bill Pope
"Go Walking Down There"	1995	Bill Pope
"Graduation Day"	1996	Bill Pope
"Think of Tomorrow"	1996	Jonathan K. Bendis
"Please"	1998	Pate Brothers
"Baby Did a Bad, Bad Thing"	1999	Herb Ritts
"Let Me Down Easy"	2002	Logan
"Washington Square"	2004	Joe Thomas
"We Let Her Down"	2009	Nick Spanos
"You Don't Cry Like I Do"	2009	Nick Spanos
"Pandemic Blues"	2021	
