= Best of Chris Isaak =

Greatest hits album by Chris Isaak
- Released: May 9, 2006
- Recorded: 1984–2006
- Genres: Rock and roll; rockabilly; roots rock
- Length: 1:02:39
- Label: Reprise
- Producers: Chris Isaak; Eric Rosse; Erik Jacobsen; John Shanks

Chris Isaak chronology
Christmas (2004)	Best of Chris Isaak (2006)	Live in Australia (2008)

Professional ratings
Review scores
Source	Rating
AllMusic	4.5/5 stars

Best of Chris Isaak is a greatest hits album by Chris Isaak released on May 9, 2006 on the Reprise/Warner Bros. Records label. The 18 song collection has three new tracks: "King Without a Castle", "Let's Have a Party" and a cover of Cheap Trick's "I Want You to Want Me".

== Track listing ==
No.	Title	Writer(s)	Album	Length
1.	"San Francisco Days"	Chris Isaak	San Francisco Days (1993)	2:59
2.	"Somebody's Crying"	Chris Isaak	Forever Blue (1995)	2:47
3.	"Wicked Game"	Chris Isaak	Heart Shaped World (1989)	4:46
4.	"Baby Did a Bad Bad Thing"	Chris Isaak	Forever Blue (1995)	2:56
5.	"Let Me Down Easy"	Chris Isaak	Always Got Tonight (2002)	4:05
6.	"Two Hearts"	Chris Isaak	San Francisco Days (1993)	3:34
7.	"King Without a Castle"	Chris Isaak		3:06
8.	"Only the Lonely"	Joe Melson, Roy Orbison	Baja Sessions (1996)	2:53
9.	"Speak of The Devil"	Chris Isaak	Speak of the Devil (1998)	3:30
10.	"Blue Spanish Sky"	Chris Isaak	Heart Shaped World (1989)	3:57
11.	"You Owe Me Some Kind of Love"	Chris Isaak	Chris Isaak (1987)	3:47
12.	"Can't Do a Thing (To Stop Me)"	Chris Isaak, Brian Elliot	San Francisco Days (1993)	3:37
13.	"Let's Have a Party"	Chris Isaak		3:27
14.	"Dancin'"	Chris Isaak	Silvertone (1985)	3:45
15.	"Blue Hotel"	Chris Isaak	Chris Isaak (1987)	3:12
16.	"Please"	Chris Isaak	Speak of the Devil (1998)	3:36
17.	"I Want You to Want Me"	Rick Nielsen		3:21
18.	"Forever Blue (acoustic version)"	Chris Isaak	Forever Blue (1995)	2:38

== Bonus DVD ==
1. "Wicked Game" (directed by Herb Ritts)
2. "Dancin'" (Mary Lambert)
3. "Somebody's Crying" (Bill Pope and Chris Isaak)
4. "San Francisco Days" (Gus Van Sant)
5. "Blue Spanish Sky" (Bruce Weber)
6. "Baby Did a Bad, Bad Thing" (Herb Ritts)
7. "Can't Do a Thing (To Stop Me)" (Chris Isaak)
8. "Let Me Down Easy" (Logan)
9. "Blue Hotel" (Mark Lebon)
10. "Dark Moon" (Nicola Pecorini)
11. "Don't Make Me Dream About You" (Geoffrey Barish)
12. "Think of Tomorrow" (Jonathan Bendis)
13. "Go Walking Down There" (Bill Pope)
14. "You Owe Me Some Kind of Love" (Jean-Baptiste Mondino)
15. "Gone Ridin'" (Theodorus Bafaloukos)
16. "Please" (Jonas Pate and Josh Pate)
17. "Washington Square" (Joe Thomas)
18. "Wicked Game" (European version) (Herb Ritts)
19. "Solitary Man" (Larry Clark)

Note: the "Solitary Man" video (not listed on the CD cover) is only available with the audio commentary on.

== Writing and publishing credits ==
All songs written by Chris Isaak and published by C. Isaak Music Publishing Co. (ASCAP) except:

- "Can't Do a Thing to Stop Me" written by Chris Isaak and Brian Elliot. Published by C. Isaak Music Publishing Co./Elliot Jacobsen Music (ASCAP)
- "Only the Lonely" written by Joe Melson and Roy Orbison. Published by Barbara Orbison Music Company/Roy Orbison Music Company/Sony/ATV Acuff Rose Music (BMI)
- "I Want You to Want Me" written by Rick Nielsen. Published by Screen-Gems-EMI Music, Inc./Adult Music (BMI).

All songs mastered by Steve Hall at Future Disc.

== Charts ==
Chart (2006)	Peak position
Australian Albums (ARIA)	1
Belgian Albums (Ultratop Flanders)	93
Belgian Albums (Ultratop Wallonia)	28
Danish Albums (Hitlisten)	33
Finnish Albums (Suomen virallinen lista)	31
German Albums (Offizielle Top 100)	44
Hungarian Albums (MAHASZ)	18
New Zealand Albums (RMNZ)	2
Norwegian Albums (VG-lista)	27
Swiss Albums (Schweizer Hitparade)	86
UK Albums (Official Charts)	65
US Billboard 200	54

== Certifications ==
Region	Certification	Certified units/sales
Australia (ARIA)	3× Platinum	210,000^{^}
France (SNEP)	Gold	75,000^{*}
^{*} Sales figures based on certification alone.^{^} Shipments figures based on certification alone.
