= Mark Needham =

- Occupations: Mixer; producer; engineer
- Website: markneedham.com

Mark Needham is an American music engineer, mixer and producer. He has worked with many prominent names in music, including: Blue October, Newsboys, Fleetwood Mac, The Killers, Imagine Dragons, Chris Isaak, John Hiatt, Michelle Branch, P!nk, O.A.R., Neon Trees, Shakira, Pete Yorn, Bloc Party, Elton John, Stevie Nicks, Starbenders, and others.

Over the course of more than three decades as an engineer and mixer, Mark Needham has worked with a wide variety of acts from different genres, including Bruce Hornsby, blues legend Charles Brown, and jazz greats Pharoah Sanders, Nat Adderley and Cedar Walton. He first met Lindsey Buckingham when he was brought in at the suggestion of Rob Cavallo to mix what was then to be a solo album for the guitarist in L.A. The two hit it off, and the solo album turned into a Fleetwood Mac disc.

"Mr. Brightside" (certified Diamond selling via SoundScan) off The Killers' multi platinum selling album Hot Fuss, was recorded in just a few hours and mixed by Needham on a 12-channel Neve mixing console in about 40 minutes.

== Selected discography ==
| Artist | Album | Label | Credit | Year |
|---|---|---|---|---|
| Girl Tones | Song: Stubborn Mouth | Big Loud Rock/ Parallel Vision | Mixing | 2026 |
| Chris Isaak | Heart Shaped World (Lmt Ed UltraDisc One-Step 180g 45RPM Vinyl 2LP Box Set) | Sun Records | Engineering & Mixing | 2026 |
| Iration | Song Stay Positive w/ Kabaka Pyramid on current album Where It All Began | Three Prong Records | Mixing | 2026 |
| Men Without Hats | Songs on current album 'Men Without Hats On The Moon' including: I Love the '80s & In Glorious Days | Shocore Music Inc. / MWH Entertainment Inc. | Mixing | 2025 |
| The Grascals and Dolly Parton | Song : Broken Angels | Billy Blue Records | Mixing | 2025 |
| Palaye Royale | Song: Just My Type on album Death or Glory | Sumerian Records | Mixing | 2024 |
| Militarie Gun | Album Life Under The Gun including single Do It Faster | Loma Vista/Concord | Mixing | 2024 |
| Chris Isaak | Beyond The Sun - The Complete Collection | Sun Records | Production/mixing | 2024 |
| Almost Monday | Sunburn on current album Dive | Hollywood Records | Production/mixing | 2024 |
| Dolly Parton | Current tracks: We Are The Champions/We Will Rock You, Magic Man (Carl Version) featuring Ann Wilson & Howard Leese, Bygones featuring Rob Halford, John 5 & Nikki Sixx & World on Fire on forthcoming album Rockstar scheduled release: November 2023 | Butterfly Records | Production/mixing | 2023 |
| Candlebox | Current single Punks & forthcoming album The Long Goodbye scheduled release August 2023 | Round Hill Records | Mixing | 2023 |
| Blue October | Current track: Down Here Waiting & forthcoming album Spinning The Truth Around, pt. 2, scheduled release September 2023 | Up/Down-Brando Records | Mixing | 2023 |
| The Record Company | Current single Talk to Me | Round Hill Records | Mixing | 2023 |
| The Criticals | Tracks on current EP Front Door Confrontations including single Belmont | Fantasy Records/Concord Label Group | Mixing | 2023 |
| Yam Haus | Current singles: Stupid and Famous & Rafters | Big Loud Rock | Mixing | 2023 |
| Bluphoria | Current self titled album including singles: Ain’t Got Me, Set Me Up & Walk Through The Fire | EDGEOUT Records/Universal Music Group | Production/Mixing | 2023 |
| Michael Franti & Spearhead | Follow Your Heart | Thirty Tigers | Mixing | 2022 |
| Dolly Parton | Run, Rose, Run - Dolby Atmos edition | Butterfly Records | Mixing | 2022 |
| Saint Motel | The Original Motion Picture Soundtrack, Parts 1, 2 & 3 | Elektra Records | Production | 2021 |
| Dolly Parton | A Holly Dolly Christmas | Butterfly Records | Mixing | 2021 |
| Blue October | This is What I Live For | Up/Down Records | Mixing | 2020 |
| The Record Company | All of This Life | Concord Records | Mixing | 2018 |
| Blue October | I Hope You're Happy | Up/Down Records | Mixing | 2018 |
| Big Head Todd and the Monsters | New World Arisin | Big Records | Mixing | 2017 |
| Buckingham McVie | Buckingham McVie | East West Records/Warner Music UK Limited | Mixing | 2017 |
| Starbenders | Heavy Petting | Institution Records | Mixing | 2016 |
| Graham the Empire | Rise | Independent | Mixing | 2016 |
| Blue October | Home | Up/Down Records | Mixing | 2016 |
| Moby | Everything Was Beautiful, And Nothing Hurt | Little Idiot | Mixing | 2015 |
| Blues Traveler | Blow Up the Moon | BT Records | Mixing | 2015 |
| Chris Isaak | First Comes the Night | Vanguard Records | Production, Mixing | 2015 |
| The Sounds | The Tales That We Tell | Arnioki Records | Mixing | 2015 |
| Dominique de Witte | Supernova | Mauve Records | Mixing | 2015 |
| Parade of Lights | Feeling Electric | Capitol Records | Mixing | 2015 |
| Scott Weiland and the Wildabouts | Blaster | Softdrive Records | Mixing | 2015 |
| Never Shout Never | Recycled Youth | Atlantic Records | Mixing | 2015 |
| Coin | Coin | Capitol Records | Mixing | 2015 |
| Five Knives | Savages | Red Bull Records | Mixing | 2015 |
| Kodaline | Coming Up for Air | Sony Music UK | Mixing | 2015 |
| Gemini Club | End of Your Life | Red Bull Records | Mixing | 2015 |
| The Airborne Toxic Event | Dope Machines | Epic Records | Mixing | 2015 |
| Smallpools | Lovetap! | RCA Records | Mixing | 2015 |
| Colton Dixon | Anchor | Sparrow Records | Mixing | 2014 |
| Empires | Orphan | Island Records | Mixing | 2014 |
| American Authors | Oh, What a Life | Island Def Jam Music Group | Mixing | 2014 |
| Twin Atlantic | Great Divide | Red Bull Records | Mixing | 2014 |
| Nico Vega | Lead to Light | Five Seven Music | Mixing | 2014 |
| James Durbin | Celebrate | Wind-Up Records | Mixing | 2014 |
| Sleeper Agent | About Last Night | Mom & Pop/RCA Records | Mixing | 2014 |
| Tokyo Police Club | Forcefield | Mom& Pop/RCA Records | Mixing | 2014 |
| Whiskey Myers | Early Morning Shakes | Wiggy Thump Records | Mixing | 2014 |
| Union J | Last Goodbye - Single | Sony Music Entertainment | Mixer | 2014 |
| Russian Red | Agent Cooper | Sony Music Spain | Mixing | 2014 |
| The Airborne Toxic Event | Hell and Back - Radio Single | Mercury Records | Mixing | 2014 |
| Dolly Parton | Blue Smoke | Sony Music Entertainment | Mixing | 2014 |
| Mikky Ekko | Smile - Single | RCA Records | Mixing | 2014 |
| John Paul White | The Long Goodbye | Akram Records | Mixing | 2013 |
| The Royal Concept | Royal - EP | Lava Records | Mixing | 2013 |
| Royal Teeth | Glow | Dangerbird Records | Mixing | 2013 |
| Mona | Torches and Pitchforks | Mercury Records | Mixing | 2013 |
| Birds of Tokyo | Lanterns - Radio Single | Loma Vista Recordings | Mixing | 2013 |
| Sick Puppies | Connect | Virgin Records | Production, Co-Production, Mixing | 2013 |
| Youngblood Hawke | Wake Up | Republic Records | Mixing | 2013 |
| The Postelles | And It Shook Me | +1 Records | Mixing | 2013 |
| Walk the Moon | Tightrope - EP | RCA Records | Production, Mixing | 2013 |
| American Authors | American Authors - EP | Mercury Records | Mixing | 2013 |
| Terraplane Sun | Ya Never Know | Trauma 2 Records | Mixing | 2013 |
| New Politics | A Bad Girl in Harlem | RCA Records | Mixing | 2013 |
| Michael Fitzgerald | Firecracker - EP | Trauma 2 Records | Mixing | 2013 |
| Train | California 37: Mermaids of Alcatraz Tour Edition | Columbia Records | Mixing | 2013 |
| Joan Jett & the Blackhearts | Any Weather - Radio Single | Blackheart Records | Mixing | 2013 |
| The Unlikely Candidates | Follow My Feet - EP | Atlantic Records | Mixing | 2013 |
| P!nk | The Truth About Love | RCA Records | Mixing | 2012 |
| The 1975 | Sex - Radio Single | Vagrant Records | Mixing | 2012 |
| Walk the Moon | Walk the Moon | RCA Records | Mixing | 2012 |
| Imagine Dragons | Night Visions | Kid In Da Corner/Interscope | Mixing | 2012 |
| The Sounds | Something to Die For | Side One Dummy/Warner Music Sweden | Mixing | 2011 |
| Blondie | Panic of Girls | EMI/ Eleven Seven Records | Mixing | 2011 |
| Hedley | Storms | Universal Records Canada | Mixing | 2011 |
| These Kids Wear Crowns | Jumpstart | EMI Canada | Mixing | 2011 |
| O.A.R. | King | Wind-Up Records | Mixing | 2011 |
| Shakira | Sale el Sol | Epic Records | Mixing | 2010 |
| Shakira and Freshlyground | "Time for Africa" | Sony Music Entertainment | Mixing | 2010 |
| Neon Trees | Habits | Mercury Records | Mixing | 2010 |
| Big Time Rush | Famous - Radio Single | Columbia Records | Mixing | 2010 |
| Cobra Starship | Hot Mess - Radio Single | Fueled By Ramen | Mixing | 2009 |
| Iglu & Hartly | & Then Boom | Mercury Records UK | Mixing | 2009 |
| 3OH!3 | Starstrukk - Radio Single | Atlantic Records | Mixing | 2009 |
| Chris Isaak | Mr. Lucky | Reprise Records | Mixing | 2009 |
| The Little Ones | Morning Tide | Chop Shop/Atlantic Records | Mixing | 2009 |
| O.A.R. | All Sides | Atlantic Records | Mixing | 2008 |
| Sick Puppies | Tri-Polar | Virgin Records | Mixing | 2008 |
| The Killers | Sawdust | Island Records | Mixing | 2007 |
| Mayday Parade | A Lesson in Romantics | Fearless Records | Mixing | 2007 |
| The Academy Is... | Santi | Atlantic Records | Mixing | 2007 |
| Metro Station | Metro Station | Columbia Records | Mixing | 2007 |
| Stevie Nicks | Crystal Visions – The Very Best of Stevie Nicks | Reprise Records | Mixing | 2007 |
| Pete Yorn | Nightcrawler | Columbia Records | Mixing | 2006 |
| Bloc Party | I Still Remember - Radio Single | Atlantic Records | Mixing | 2006 |
| Lindsey Buckingham | Under the Skin | Warner Brothers | Mixing | 2006 |
| We Are Scientists | With Love and Squalor | Virgin Records | Mixing | 2006 |
| Cobra Starship | While the City Sleeps, We Rule the Streets | Decaydance Records | Mixing | 2006 |
| Shannon Noll | Lift | Sony Music Australia | Mixing | 2005 |
| The Veronicas | Cry | Sire Records | Mixing | 2005 |
| The Killers | Hot Fuss | Island Records | Mixing | 2004 |
| Fleetwood Mac | Live in Boston | Warner Brothers, Reprise | Mixing | 2004 |
| Fleetwood Mac | Say You Will | Warner Brothers, Reprise | Mixing | 2003 |
| Chris Isaak | Always Got Tonight | Reprise Records | Mixing | 2002 |
| Simon Says | Shut Your Breath | Hollywood Records | Producer, Mixing | 2001 |
| Chris Isaak | Speak of the Devil | Reprise Records | Mixing | 1998 |
| Chris Isaak | Wicked Game | Reprise Records | Mixing | 1998 |
| Bruce Hornsby | Spirit Trail | RCA Records | Mixing | 1998 |
| Cake | Prolonging the Magic | Capricorn | Mixing | 1998 |
| John Hiatt | Little Head | Capitol Records | Mixing | 1997 |
| Mark Eitzel | West | Warner Brothers | Mixing | 1997 |
| Mark Eitzel | 60 Watt Silver Lining | Warner Brothers | Engineering and Mixing | 1996 |
| Red House Painters | Songs for a Blue Guitar | PolyGram Records | Mixing | 1996 |
| Red House Painters | Ocean Beach | 4AD, Warner Brothers Records | Mixing | 1995 |

== Chart positions ==
| Song/Album | Artist | Year | Chart | Position |
|---|---|---|---|---|
| Hot Fuss | The Killers | 2005 | US Billboard 200 | 7 |
| "Mr. Brightside" | The Killers | 2005 | US Billboard 100 | 10 |
| A Lesson in Romantics | Mayday Parade | 2007 | US Billboard Top Heatseekers | 8 |
| Mr. Lucky | Chris Isaak | 2007 | US Billboard Rock Albums | 10 |
| "Shake It" | Metro Station | 2008 | US Pop | 4 |
| Habits | Neon Trees | 2010 | US Billboard Heatseekers Albums | 1 |
| "Waka Waka (This Time for Africa)" | Shakira | 2010 | US Billboard Hot Latin Songs | 2 |
| Sale el Sol | Shakira | 2010 | US Billboard 200 | 7 |
| Sale el Sol | Shakira | 2010 | US Billboard Latin Pop Album | 4 |
| Night Visions | Imagine Dragons | 2012-2014 | Billboard Top Alternative Albums, Billboard Top Rock Albums | 1 |
| Night Visions | Imagine Dragons | 2012-2014 | US Billboard 200 | 2 |
| The Truth About Love | P!nk | 2012 | Billboard 200 | 7 |
| "Try" | P!nk | 2012 | Billboard Hot 100 | 1 |
| "Drive By" | Train | 2012 | Billboard Hot 100 | 10 |
| Blue Smoke | Dolly Parton | 2014 | US Billboard 200 | 6 |
| Blue Smoke | Dolly Parton | 2014 | US Billboard Top Country Albums | 2 |
| Lead to Light | Nico Vega | 2014 | US Billboard Heatseakers | 9 |
| Oh, What a Life | American Authors | 2014 | US Rock | 3 |
| "Savages" | Five Knives | 2015 | Dance Club Songs | 5 |
| Home | Blue October | 2016 | Billboard 200 | 19 |
| "Wish I Knew You" | The Revivalists | 2017 | Alternative Songs | 1 |
| "Life to Fix" | The Record Company | 2018 | Alternative Adult Songs | 1 |
| Wicked Game | Chris isaak | 2019 | Billboard Rock Digital Song Sales | 1 |
| When Life Is Good Again | Dolly Parton | 2020 | Billboard Country Digital Song Sales | 11 |
| Oh My My | Blue October | 2020 | Billboard Alternative Airplay | 12 |
| Live Forever | Almost Monday | 2021 | Mediabase Alternative | 27 |
| Brighter Day | Michael Franti & Spearhead | 2022 | Mediabase AAA | 37 |
| Hands | Dianña | 2022 | Billboard Adult Contemporary | 21 |
| Sun Keeps on Shining | Almost Monday | 2022 | Mediabase Alternative | 11 |
| Finding My Way Home | Lavendine | 2023 | Billboard Adult Contemporary | 27 |
| Down Here Waiting | Blue October | 2023 | Mediabase Alternative | 30 |
| Talk to Me | The Record Company | 2023 | Mediabase AAA | 11 |
