= Live in Australia (Chris Isaak album) =

Live album by Chris Isaak
- Released: October 17, 2008
- Recorded: November 22, 2006
- Genres: Rockabilly, roots rock, rock and roll
- Length: 1:11:59
- Label: Universal Music

Chris Isaak chronology
Best of Chris Isaak (2006)	Live in Australia (2008)	Mr. Lucky (2009)

Professional ratings
Review scores
Source	Rating
Allmusic	

Live in Australia is a 2008 live album by American rock musician Chris Isaak. The album was recorded in Melbourne, Australia in 2006.

== Track listing ==
No.	Title	Album	Length
1.	"Speak of the Devil"	Speak of the Devil (1998)	4:15
2.	"Let Me Down Easy"	Always Got Tonight (2002)	4:05
3.	"Intro (To "I'll Go Crazy")"		1:37
4.	"I'll Go Crazy"		3:13
5.	"Go Walkin' Down There"	Forever Blue (1995)	3:43
6.	"Wicked Game"	Heart Shaped World (1989)	5:02
7.	"Lonely with a Broken Heart"	San Francisco Days (1993)	2:49
8.	"Intro (To "Baby Did a Bad Bad Thing")"		1:28
9.	"Baby Did a Bad Bad Thing"	Forever Blue (1995)	4:26
10.	"This Love Will Last"	Chris Isaak (1986)	3:13
11.	"Waiting"	San Francisco Days (1993)	3:04
12.	"Blue Darlin'"		3:31
13.	"Intro (To "Only the Lonely")"		2:03
14.	"Only the Lonely"	Baja Sessions (1996)	2:51
15.	"One Day"	Always Got Tonight (2002)	4:19
16.	"Somebody's Crying"	Forever Blue (1995)	2:49
17.	"Blue Hotel"	Chris Isaak (1986)	3:14
18.	"San Francisco Days"	San Francisco Days (1993)	4:04
19.	"Dancin'"	Silvertone (1985)	4:08
20.	"Blue Spanish Sky"	Heart Shaped World (1989)	3:57
21.	"American Boy (iTunes Store exclusive track)"	Always Got Tonight (2002)	3:08

== Personnel ==
- Chris Isaak – lead vocals, guitar
- Hershel Yatovitz – lead guitar, vocals
- Rowland Salley – bass, vocals
- Scott Plunkett – keyboards, accordion, vocals
- Kenney Dale Johnson – drums, vocals
- Rafael Padilla – percussion
