= Orphan (Empires album) =

Studio album by Empires (band)
- Released: September 23, 2014
- Genre: Indie rock, alternative rock
- Length: 44:57
- Label: Island Records / Chop Shop Records
- Producer: John Congleton

Empires (band) chronology
Garage Hymns (2012)	Orphan (2014)

Orphan is the third full-length album by American indie-rock band Empires, released in 2014.

Professional ratings
Review scores
Source	Rating
Allmusic	3.5/5 stars
Consequence of Sound	B

== Reception ==
Rolling Stone: "Their music is some of this year’s very best"

Billboard (magazine): " The story of Empires’ new album is the story of what a great producer can do for an already-promising band."

Consequence of Sound: " Brick by musical brick, Empires are steadily evolving into the pop rock powerhouse that they evidently have the makeup to be. If the band continue to smartly and steadily branch out like they do on Orphan, they could soon be taking to the bigger stages and venues that the record’s songs so eagerly court."

Stereogum: "Empires make timeless music – upbeat yet melancholy, pleasant but not saccharine, lyrics tangled up in the messy business of romance...These guys have their own thing going, and that thing is highly appropriate for the summer that is about to unfold before us."

The Huffington Post: "Empires have such a distinct sound I don't know whether to tell you they sound like The National meets [insert alt rock band here] or simply just say it's quality alt/indie-rock blended with subtle 1980s tones. Let's go with the latter."

== Track listing ==
All lyrics are written by Sean Van Vleet; all music is composed by Empires

No.	Title	Length
1.	"Silverfire"	3:59
2.	"Orphan"	3:49
3.	"Hostage"	3:45
4.	"Shadowfaux"	3:21
5.	"Honeyblood"	2:48
6.	"Lifers"	4:15
7.	"How Good Does It Feel"	2:45
8.	"Please Don't Tell My Lover"	3:02
9.	"Stay Lonely"	2:52
10.	"Glow"	3:18
11.	"Journey Kid"	4:09

== Personnel ==
Produced & Mixed by: John Congleton
Recorded at Elmwood Funeral Home, Dallas, TX
"How Good Does It Feel" and "Orphan" mixed by Mark Needham
Mastered by Stephen Marcussen at Marcussen Mastering
Artwork by Tom Conrad
Keyboards, Mellotron, Moog Synthesizer by Bobby Sparks
Bass by Julio Tavarez
