= Angel Baby =

Angel Baby may refer to:

- Rainbow baby, a baby that died during pregnancy or after.
- Angel Baby (album), 2017 compilation album by Jenni Rivera
- "Angel Baby" (Dean Martin song), a 1958 single by Dean Martin
- "Angel Baby" (Rosie and the Originals song), a 1960 single by Rosie and the Originals
- "Angel Baby" (Troye Sivan song), a 2021 single by Troye Sivan
- Angel Baby (1961 film), 1961 film by Paul Wendkos
- Angel Baby (1968 film), a West German film by Marran Gosov
- Angel Baby (1995 film), 1995 Australian film
- "Angel Baby (Don't You Ever Leave Me)", a song by Darrell Banks

== See also ==
- "My Angel Baby", 1978 single by Toby Beau
