= Guilty Street =

Studio album by Kitty Wells
- Released: April 1969
- Genre: Country
- Label: Decca

Guilty Street is an album by country singer Kitty Wells, released in 1969 on the Decca label (DL 75098). The album included two songs that charted on the Billboard country singles chart: "Happiness Hill" (No. 47) and "Guilty Street" (No. 61).

In connection with the album's release, Decca designated April 1969 as "Kitty Wells Month." Music critic Al Freeders gave the album three stars, called it "a great package", and concluded: "Let us bow to the Queen, she is again a winner."

Greg Adams of AllMusic gave the album two-and-a-half stars. Adams opined that "Wells' nasal voice was an artifact of the '50s and primarily appealed to the loyal remnants of her old audience."

== Track listing ==
Side A

1. "Guilty Street" (Cecil Null) [2:52]
2. "Shape Up Or Get Out" (Jim Anglin) [2:05]
3. "Happiness Hill" (Roy Botkin) [2:50]
4. "You're No Angel Yourself" (Jim Anglin) [2:25]
5. "We Could" (Felice Bryant) [2:37]
6. "Daddy Sang Bass" (Carl Perkins) [2:30]

Side B

1. "I've Got You On My Mind Again" (Buck Owens) [2:27]
2. "Born To Be With You" (Don Robertson) [2:35]
3. "I Walk Alone" (Herbert W. Wilson) [2:22]
4. "Stand By Your Man" (Glenn Sutton, Billy Sherrill, Tammy Wynette) [2:37]
5. "Only The Lonely (Know The Way I Feel)" (Joe Melson, Roy Orbison) [2:14]
