= Return to Me (song) =

1958 song performed by Dean Martin

Single by Dean Martin
- B-side: "Forgetting You"
- Released: February 17, 1958
- Recorded: January 23, 1958
- Studio: Capitol Studios, Hollywood, California
- Genre: Traditional pop
- Length: 2:21
- Label: Capitol
- Songwriters: Carmen Lombardo, Danny Di Minno

Dean Martin singles chronology
"Good Mornin' Life" (1957)	"Return to Me" (1958)	"Angel Baby" (1958)

"Return to Me" is a song with music by Carmen Lombardo and lyrics by Danny Di Minno. The song was released in 1958 by Dean Martin. Martin recorded the song again in 1961 for his album Dino: Italian Love Songs.

== Chart performance ==
The song spent 22 weeks on the United Kingdom's New Musical Express chart, peaking at No. 2, while reaching No. 1 in the Netherlands, No. 5 on Canada's CHUM Hit Parade, No. 7 in Flanders, and No. 8 on Norway's VG-lista. In the United States, the song reached No. 4 on Billboard's Top 100 Sides, No. 4 on Billboard's chart of "Best Selling Pop Singles in Stores”, and No. 4 on Billboard's chart of "Most Played by Jockeys".

Chart (1958)	Peak position
Canada (CHUM Hit Parade)	5
Flanders	7
Netherlands	1
Norway (VG-lista)	8
UK New Musical Express	2
US Billboard - Top 100 Sides	4
US Billboard - Best Selling Pop Singles in Stores	4
US Billboard - Most Played by Jockeys	4
Wallonia	20

== Other versions ==
- Denny Dennis - a single release in the UK in 1958.
- Elvis Presley - made a relaxed version of this song in December 1958, while performing military service in Germany, during his stay at the Hotel Grunewald, Bad Nauheim, where he resided.
- Connie Francis - for her album More Italian Favorites (1960).
- Jerry Vale - included in his album I Have But One Heart (1962).
- Marty Robbins released a version of the song in 1978, which reached No. 6 on the Billboard Hot Country Singles chart.
- Chris Isaak for the album Baja Sessions (1996)
- Bob Dylan and his band recorded a version for the third season of The Sopranos in 2001.
- Deana Martin recorded "Return to Me" on her second studio album, Volare, released in 2009 by Big Fish Records.
- Tony Bennett and Vicente Fernández for the album Viva Duets (2012)
- Claude Blouin - an orchestral version in the Rumba style released on the album "Ballroom Dancing The Best of Claude Blouin 'Disque de Danse'" (1990)

== Popular culture ==
- Dean Martin's version is featured as the title song in the 2000 film Return to Me.
- The song plays on the radio in Mafia II, two of the characters, Joe Barbaro and Eddie Scarpa, even sing the song in Chapter 7.
