= Dan Folger =

American singer and songwriter (1943–2006)

Dan Waren Folger
- Born: Dan Waren Folger; April 11, 1943; San Rafael, California, United States
- Died: March 23, 2006 (aged 62)
- Occupations: Songwriter; singer

Dan Folger (April 11, 1943 – March 23, 2006) was an American singer and songwriter.

== Biography ==
Born Dan Waren Folger in San Rafael, California, while he was a small boy his family moved to Midland, Texas, where he would make friends with future Roy Orbison collaborator Joe Melson.

His and his friends' interest in music led to a move to Nashville, Tennessee, in the 1960s. There, under Don Gant, Folger wrote songs for Acuff-Rose Music including the song "Amy", which appeared on the 1969 album, Roy Orbison's Many Moods. Other Folger compositions were recorded by Melson, Sam the Sham and the Pharaohs, and Glass Bubble, among others.

As a performer, Folger recorded four singles (eight songs) for Hickory Records between 1962 and 1966, and another single for Elf Records in 1967. Several of these singles were co-written by Folger and Melson.

Perhaps Folger's best-known composition is "Weeping Annaleah", a song co-written with Mickey Newbury. It was recorded by Newbury, Tom Jones, The Box Tops, Gordon Waller, Bob Shane, and (under the title "Sleeping Annaleah") by Nick Cave.

In 1998, Folger resided at the Salvation Army for several years in East Texas, where he played in a religious band on Sundays.

He died in Bentonville, Arkansas in 2006, at the age of 62.

== See also ==
- American Music
