= Christmas (Chris Isaak album) =

Studio album by Chris Isaak
- Released: October 12, 2004
- Recorded: 2003–2004
- Genres: Rock and roll, rockabilly, Christmas
- Length: 40:05
- Label: Reprise
- Producer: Chris Isaak

Chris Isaak chronology
Always Got Tonight (2002)	Christmas (2004)	Best of Chris Isaak (2006)

Professional ratings
Review scores
Source	Rating
Allmusic	3.5/5 stars

Christmas is a 2004 album by Chris Isaak released on Warner Bros. Records.

== Track listing ==
All tracks composed by Chris Isaak, except where indicated:

1. "Rudolph the Red-Nosed Reindeer" (Johnny Marks) – 2:12
2. "Have Yourself a Merry Little Christmas" (Hugh Martin, Ralph Blane) – 3:10
3. "Santa Claus Is Coming to Town" (J. Fred Coots, Haven Gillespie) – 2:30
4. "Washington Square" – 3:22
5. "Blue Christmas" (Bill Hayes, Jay Johnson) – 2:20
6. "The Christmas Song" (Mel Tormé, Robert Wells) – 2:47
7. "Hey Santa!" – 2:43
8. "Let It Snow" (Sammy Cahn, Jule Styne) – 2:29
9. "Christmas on TV" – 2:19
10. "Pretty Paper" (Willie Nelson) – 2:33
11. "White Christmas" (Irving Berlin) – 2:32
12. "Mele Kalikimaka" (Robert Alex Anderson) – 1:56
13. "Brightest Star" – 3:03
14. "Last Month of the Year" (Traditional) – 2:14
15. "Gotta Be Good" – 2:42
16. "Auld Lang Syne" (Traditional) – 1:09

Australian edition bonus tracks

17. "I'll Be Home for Christmas" (Kim Gannon, Walter Kent, Buck Ram) – 2:48
18. "Santa Bring My Baby Back" (Claude Demetrius, Aaron Schroeder) – 2:12

== Personnel ==
- Chris Isaak – vocals, guitar
- Hershel Yatovitz – guitar, vocals
- Rowland Salley – bass, vocals
- Kenney Dale Johnson – drums, vocals

with:

- Stevie Nicks – vocals, percussion
- Jamie Muhoberac, Jimmy Pugh, Mark Isham, Patrick Warren, Rafael Padilla, Robin DiMaggio, Scott Plunkett – additional musicians
- Bob Joyce, David Joyce, Jon Joyce, Walt Harrah – backing vocals

Technical

- Mark Needham – recording, mixing
- Michael Tsay – photography

== Charts ==
Chart (2017)	Peak position
Australian Albums (ARIA)	26

== Sales and certifications ==
Region	Certification	Certified units/sales
United States	—	152,000
