= The Frequency =

Independent rock band from Los Angeles

- Origin: Los Angeles, California, United States
- Genres: Indie rock, Electronica, Ambient
- Years active: 2005–2011
- Labels: Ropeadope Records; Trussed
- Members: Marc Cazorla; Alex Stiff; Mark Quinn
- Website: Official Website

The Frequency was an independent rock band from Los Angeles, CA. Marc Cazorla and Alex Stiff, later of The Record Company, were the core songwriting and recording duo behind the music. They used an array of analog and vintage instruments to create sounds described by NME as "stripped back music strengthened by simplicity as much as beauty". Q Magazine gave the release "Morning to 3 A.M." 3 out of 4 stars and hailed the band as "able to form perfectly crafted Air-like synth-pop while also stretching their wings on the 17 minute ever-shifting psych rock track 'Ego Is the Drug/3 A.M.'

In 2010, The Frequency signed a worldwide publishing deal with Chrysalis Music in the UK. The song "Jim Gordon Part II" played all over the globe due to being licensed for a yearlong BlackBerry television commercial campaign. Music from The Frequency was also featured in major motion pictures and television shows.

Inspired by music from Pink Floyd, Air, Can, and Spiritualized, the live show added intensity to the music. The Frequency shared the stage with diverse artists, such as Black Rebel Motorcycle Club, The Bravery, Primus, Matisyahu, Mutemath, and Lotus. The show was described as an audio/visual feast for the senses and led Quebec City's Live Daily newspaper to declare "The Frequency should be on every rock fan's radar."

The Frequency's "Jim Gordon Part II" was nominated for the 7th Annual Independent Music Awards for Jam Song of the year.

== Band members ==
- Marc Cazorla - Fender Rhodes, Moog, Piano, Synthesizer, Vocals
- Alex Stiff - Guitars, Vocals, Bass, Keyboards
- Mark Quinn - drums, sampler

In 2011, Marc Cazorla and Alex Stiff joined with musician Chris Vos to form The Record Company.

== Discography ==
EPs and Albums

- 2010 - Absence of Giants - Spring 2010
- 2009 - Morning to 3am EP - Trussed Recordings
- 2008 - We Are the Same Machine - self-release
- 2007 - The Frequency EP - Ropeadope Digital

Compilations

- Explorations: Classic Picante Regrooved - 2006 - Concord Records

== Appearances in media ==
- Their song "Why Do I Fear?" was featured in the final scene and end credits of "Across the Line: The Exodus of Charlie Wright"
- In January 2010 "Sanity Overture" was featured in an episode of BBC's Being Human (UK TV series)
- Their song "Stars" is featured in Lions Gate's 2008 film "The Eye". It plays in the final scene and during the end credits.
- The Song "Jim Gordon Part II" appeared in a Blackberry commercial
