= The Big O (album) =

Big O

Studio album by Roy Orbison
- Released: 1970
- Recorded: 1969
- Genre: Rock and roll
- Length: 33:06
- Label: London (HAU 8406)
- Producer: Ron Randall

Roy Orbison chronology
Roy Orbison's Many Moods (1969)	Big O (1970)	The Great Songs of Roy Orbison (1970)

Singles from The Big O
- 1. "Penny Arcade" Released: August 4, 1969

The Big O is the fourteenth music album recorded by Roy Orbison, and according to the authorised Roy Orbison biography, his second for London Records in the United Kingdom. The music and backing vocals were provided by English group, the Art Movement on all tracks except for "Penny Arcade", which was a studio recording and was released as a single in 1969, peaking at No. 27 in the UK and was Orbison's last UK chart success during his lifetime. "Penny Arcade" was also his biggest hit in Australia peaking at #1 for four weeks in September 1969. The second single, "Break My Mind", was Orbison's last Australian chart success during his lifetime, reaching #26 in January 1970. The album was released in Europe in early 1970.

The album was released on compact disc for the first time by Edsel Records in 2004 as tracks 12 through 23 on a pairing of two albums on one CD with tracks 1 through 11 consisting of Orbison's 1969 album, Roy Orbison's Many Moods. The Big O was included in a box set entitled The MGM Years 1965-1973 - Roy Orbison, which contains 12 of his MGM studio albums, 1 compilation, and was released on December 4, 2015.

== History ==
In May 1969, Roy Orbison had plans for a live album while he was on tour in the UK. The project was to be called Roy Orbison Live in England. MGM Records were not happy with his plan, however, and Orbison had to compromise. Orbison and the Art Movement turned the Batley Variety Club in West Yorkshire, England into a recording studio. This was done by calling in a mobile studio truck that had all the gear in it and running the cords into the area in which they wanted to record. Using this technique Orbison was able to achieve the polished studio sound his record label preferred in the most live sounding way possible. The orchestra was overdubbed in Nashville over the stereo two-track mix. While MGM chose not to release the album in North America, London-Decca opted to release it elsewhere in early 1970.

== Reception ==
Professional ratings
Review scores
Source	Rating
AllMusic	3.5/5 stars
The Encyclopedia of Popular Music	2/5 stars

Bruce Eder of AllMusic said that the album "he made a series of studio recordings encompassing some of the same oldies, mostly in a rock & roll vein, including "Help Me Rhonda," "Money," and "Land of 1,000 Dances," that were part of his concert set, broken up by originals such as the highly charged and exciting "Down the Line."

== Track listing ==
Side one
No.	Title	Writer(s)	Length
1.	"Break My Mind"	John D. Loudermilk	3:14
2.	"Help Me, Rhonda"	Brian Wilson, Mike Love	2:55
3.	"Only You"	Buck Ram	2:40
4.	"Down the Line"	Roy Orbison	2:25
5.	"Money"	Berry Gordy, Jr., Janie Bradford	3:00
6.	"When I Stop Dreaming"	Ira Louvin, Charlie Louvin	2:31

Side
No.	Title	Writer(s)	Length
1.	"Loving Touch"	Terry Widlake	2:48
2.	"Land of a Thousand Dances"	Chris Kenner, Fats Domino	3:12
3.	"Scarlet Ribbons (For Her Hair)"	Evelyn Danzig, Jack Segal	2:59
4.	"She Won't Hang Her Love Out (On the Line)"	Bill Dees, Mark Mathis	2:11
5.	"Casting My Spell on You"	Edwin Johnson, Alvin Johnson	2:04
6.	"Penny Arcade"	Sammy King	3:07

All produced by Ron Randall, except for "Penny Arcade" (produced by Wesley Rose) and arranged by Jim Hall.

== Personnel ==
- Roy Orbison - guitar, vocals

The Art Movement

- Billy Dean - guitar
- Roger Bryan - guitar
- Keith Headley - piano
- Terry Widlake - bass guitar
- Bob Munday - drums
- John Switters - percussion
