= Somebody's Crying =

1995 single by Chris Isaak

Single by Chris Isaak

from the album Forever Blue
- B-side: "Changed Your Mind"; "The Little White Cloud That Cried"
- Released: May 15, 1995
- Length: 2:46
- Label: Reprise
- Songwriter: Chris Isaak
- Producer: Erik Jacobsen

Chris Isaak singles chronology
"Solitary Man" (1993)	"Somebody's Crying" (1995)	"Go Walking Down There" (1995)

"Somebody's Crying" is a song by American musician Chris Isaak from his fifth album, Forever Blue (1995). The song was released as the album's first single on May 15, 1995, by Reprise Records, reaching number 45 on the US Billboard Hot 100 and becoming a top-five hit in Australia and Canada. It also appears on his 2006 Best of Chris Isaak compilation. A live version is included on Isaak's 2008 Live in Australia album.

== Inspiration and lyrics ==
Isaak wrote the song shortly after a breakup with his girlfriend. Isaak had attended a friend's party, but soon realized that he did not want to be there. He went inside a walk-in closet, closed the door, grabbed a guitar that was leaning against the back wall, and wrote "Somebody's Crying."

Lyrically, the song describes one's yearning for a former lover, and the fear of communicating again with that person. In a 1995 interview, Isaak compared the lyrics to a way children often speak:

Most of us are as terrified of love as little kids are terrified of the world. Little kids come up to you and say, "I know someone who loves you" or "I know someone who likes you." They say it like, I'm not going to really come out and say it. And for adults, it's probably the same way. They never really get beyond that fear.

== Release and reception ==
"Somebody's Crying"
Sample of "Somebody's Crying", taken from Chris Isaak's 1995 album Forever Blue.

"Somebody's Crying" peaked at number 45 on the US Billboard Hot 100 in August 1995, making it Isaak's second-highest-charting single after "Wicked Game", which reached number six in 1991. "Somebody's Crying" also peaked at number 27 on the Adult Contemporary chart, number 34 on the Modern Rock Tracks chart, and number 36 on the Top 40/Mainstream chart. Elsewhere, the song peaked at number five in Australia and number 22 in New Zealand, marking Isaak's highest chart placement in the former country. It charted the highest in Canada, climbing to number four on the RPM 100 Hit Tracks chart. The single was not as commercially successful in the United Kingdom, reaching number 81 on the UK Singles Chart.

"Somebody's Crying" received a Grammy Award nomination for Best Male Rock Vocal Performance in 1996, losing to Tom Petty's "You Don't Know How It Feels".

== Music video ==
The music video for "Somebody's Crying" was released in 1995 and was directed by Bill Pope. In contrast to the song's melancholy lyrical content, the video presents a more upbeat story of a summer romance, and features Isaak riding a surfboard, a favorite pastime of his. Isaak said, "I thought it would be more fun to do. More and more I'm trying to keep a little bit of fun in what I'm doing." Actors Jennifer Rubin, Jenna Elfman, Zen Gesner, and Chris Penn appear in the video. The video received a 1995 MTV Video Music Award nomination for Best Male Video but lost to Tom Petty's "You Don't Know How It Feels".

== Track listings ==
- Standard 7-inch, CD, and cassette single
1. "Somebody's Crying" – 2:46
2. "Changed Your Mind" – 3:50
- UK and Australian CD single
1. "Somebody's Crying" – 2:46
2. "Changed Your Mind" – 3:50
3. "The Little White Cloud That Cried" (written by Johnnie Ray) – 2:19

== Charts ==
=== Weekly charts ===
Chart (1995)	Peak position
Australia (ARIA)	5
Canada Top Singles (RPM)	4
Canada Adult Contemporary (RPM)	5
Europe (European Hit Radio)	19
Germany (GfK)	76
New Zealand (Recorded Music NZ)	22
UK Singles (Official Charts)	81
US Billboard Hot 100	45
US Adult Contemporary (Billboard)	27
US Adult Pop Airplay (Billboard)	38
US Alternative Airplay (Billboard)	34
US Pop Airplay (Billboard)	36
US Cash Box Top 100	35

=== Year-end charts ===
Chart (1995)	Position
Australia (ARIA)	49
Canada Top Singles (RPM)	42
Canada Adult Contemporary (RPM)	57

== Release history ==
Region	Date	Format(s)	Label(s)	Ref.
United States	May 8, 1995	Progressive rock; alternative radio	Reprise	
United Kingdom	May 15, 1995	CD	Reprise	
United States	May 23, 1995	Contemporary hit radio	Reprise	
Australia	May 29, 1995	CD; cassette	Reprise	

== In popular culture ==
The song was played during parts of two episodes of the Fox television series Party of Five in 1995. It was also featured in a 1995 episode of MTV's Beavis and Butt-head. An acoustic performance of the song by Isaak is included in the 2000 DVD compilation, MTV Unplugged: Ballads.
