= Roy Orbison's Many Moods =

Studio album by Roy Orbison
- Released: May 1969
- Genre: Rock
- Length: 27:09
- Label: MGM
- Producer: Wesley Rose

Roy Orbison chronology
Cry Softly Lonely One (1967)	Roy Orbison's Many Moods (1969)	The Big O (1970)

Singles from Roy Orbison's Many Moods
- 1. "Walk On" Released: June 1968; 2. "Heartache" Released: October 1968

Roy Orbison's Many Moods, also known as The Many Moods of Roy Orbison, is the thirteenth album recorded by Roy Orbison, and his seventh for MGM Records, released in May 1969, and was available both in stereo and mono. It included two singles, both of which were minor hits in the UK: "Heartache" at number 44, and "Walk On" at number 39.

It features a mix of originals and covers of standards songs like "Try to Remember", and "What Now My Love". and a version of Heartache" (which he would re-record on I'm Still in Love with You with different lyrics 6 years later in 1975).

The album was released on compact disc by Edsel Records in 2004 as tracks 1 through 11 on a pairing of two albums on one CD with tracks 12 through 23 consisting of Orbison's 1970 album, The Big O. Many Moods was included in a box set entitled The MGM Years 1965-1973 - Roy Orbison, which contains 12 of his MGM studio albums, 1 compilation, and was released on December 4, 2015.

== Reception ==
Professional ratings
Review scores
Source	Rating
AllMusic	3.5/5 stars
The Encyclopedia of Popular Music	2/5 stars

Bruce Eder of AllMusic said that the album "it holds up as well as it does. If there's a lack of driving rock -- "I Recommend Her" is as close as it gets—it's more than made up for by the intense, almost operatic singing in which Orbison engages on most of the stuff here, with "What Now My Love" and its bolero-like buildup being the highlight, followed closely by "Walk On." And the closer, his rendition of "Try to Remember" from the off-Broadway musical The Fantasticks, has a lyricism and attendant appeal all its own."

Billboard said that the album "showcases [Orbison's] unique talent in a variety of moods. He's sad and reflective" on "Heartache", then "switches moods completely with his exciting treatments of "More" and "Good Morning, Dear."

== Track listing ==
This album was only released in North America.

Side one
No.	Title	Writer(s)	Length
1.	"Truly, Truly True"	Mickey Newbury	2:29
2.	"Unchained Melody"	Alex North, Hy Zaret	3:38
3.	"I Recommend Her"	Larry Henley, Mark Mathis, Nolan Brown	2:47
4.	"More"	Riz Ortolani, Nino Oliviero; translation by Norman Newell	2:17
5.	"Heartache"	Roy Orbison, Bill Dees	3:14
6.	"Amy"	Dan Folger	2:12

Side two
No.	Title	Writer(s)	Length
1.	"Good Morning, Dear"	Newbury	2:31
2.	"What Now, My Love"	Gilbert Bécaud, Pierre Delanoë, Carl Sigman	2:46
3.	"Walk On"	Orbison, Dees	2:55
4.	"Yesterday's Child"	Orbison, Dees	2:27
5.	"Try to Remember"	Tom Jones, Harvey Schmidt	2:41

Engineered by Val Valentin
Tracks 2, 4, 8 arranged by Jim Hall
Tracks 5, 9 arranged by Emory Gordy, Jr.
