= Chris Isaak Live at the Fillmore =

Live at the Fillmore

Live album by Chris Isaak
- Released: June 15, 2010
- Recorded: 2008
- Genres: Rockabilly, roots rock, rock and roll
- Length: 64:56
- Label: Mailboat Records

Chris Isaak chronology
Mr. Lucky (2009)	Live at the Fillmore (2010)	Beyond the Sun (2011)

Professional ratings
Review scores
Source	Rating
Allmusic	3/5 stars

Live at the Fillmore is a 2010 live album by American rock musician Chris Isaak. The album was recorded in 2008.

== Track listing ==
1. "Lonely with a Broken Heart" – 3:16
2. "Somebody's Crying" – 2:52
3. "Want Your Love" – 3:43
4. "We Let Her Down" – 3:51
5. "Graduation Day" – 3:27
6. "Western Stars" – 3:28
7. "Speak of the Devil" – 3:25
8. "Wicked Game" – 4:44
9. "Best I Ever Had" – 3:57
10. "Worked It Out Wrong" – 3:43
11. "Two Hearts" – 4:11
12. "Take My Heart" – 2:43
13. "Baby Did a Bad Bad Thing" – 6:12
14. "San Francisco Days" – 2:53
15. "Move Along" – 3:36
16. "Dancin'" – 4:16
17. "Blue Spanish Sky" – 4:39
18. "Mr. Lonely Man" [Bonus Track] (Available on iTunes) – 2:49
19. "Goin' Nowhere" [Bonus Track] (Available on iTunes) – 3:21

== Personnel ==
- Chris Isaak – vocals, guitar
- Hershel Yatovitz – guitar
- Rowland Salley – bass
- Scott Plunkett – keyboards
- Kenney Dale Johnson – drums
- Rafael Padilla – percussion
