= All of This Life =

Studio album by The Record Company
- Released: June 22, 2018
- Recorded: 2017
- Genre: Rock, alternative rock
- Label: Concord Music Group/Universal

The Record Company chronology
Give It Back to You (2015)	All of This Life (2018)

Singles from All of This Life
- 1. "Life to Fix" Released: April 20, 2018; 2. "Make It Happen" Released: September 18, 2018; 3. "Goodbye to the Hard Life" Released: May 1, 2019; 4. "You and Me Now" Released: July 19, 2019

All of This Life is the second studio album by American rock band The Record Company. The album was released on June 22, 2018, and features the singles "Life to Fix" and "Make It Happen".

== Singles ==
On April 8, 2018, The Record Company revealed "Life to Fix" as the album's lead single on their Instagram. A lyric video and later release of the song took place on April 18, 2018. On June 8, 2018, a music video for the song was subsequently made available. At the top of the Adult Alternative Songs Chart, "Life to Fix" debuted. On September 19, 2018, "Make It Happen," the album's second single, and a music video were made available.

== Promotion ==
The All of This Life Tour started on September 14, 2018.

== Chart performance ==
All of This Life debuted at number 94 on the Billboard 200, selling 7,000 copies in its first week. It also peaked at number 9 on the Alternative Albums chart.

== Track listing ==
No.	Title	Length
1.	"Life to Fix"	3:59
2.	"I'm Getting Better (And I'm Feeling It Right Now)"	3:15
3.	"Goodbye to the Hard Life"	4:15
4.	"Make It Happen"	4:02
5.	"You and Me Now"	5:54
6.	"Coming Home"	3:50
7.	"The Movie Song"	6:07
8.	"Night Games"	5:17
9.	"Roll Bones"	3:41
10.	"I'm Changing"	4:31

== Charts ==
Chart (2018–2019)	Peak position
Scottish Albums (OCC)	45
US Billboard 200	94
US Folk Albums (Billboard)	4
US Top Alternative Albums (Billboard)	9
US Top Rock Albums (Billboard)	15
