= Empires (band) =

American rock band

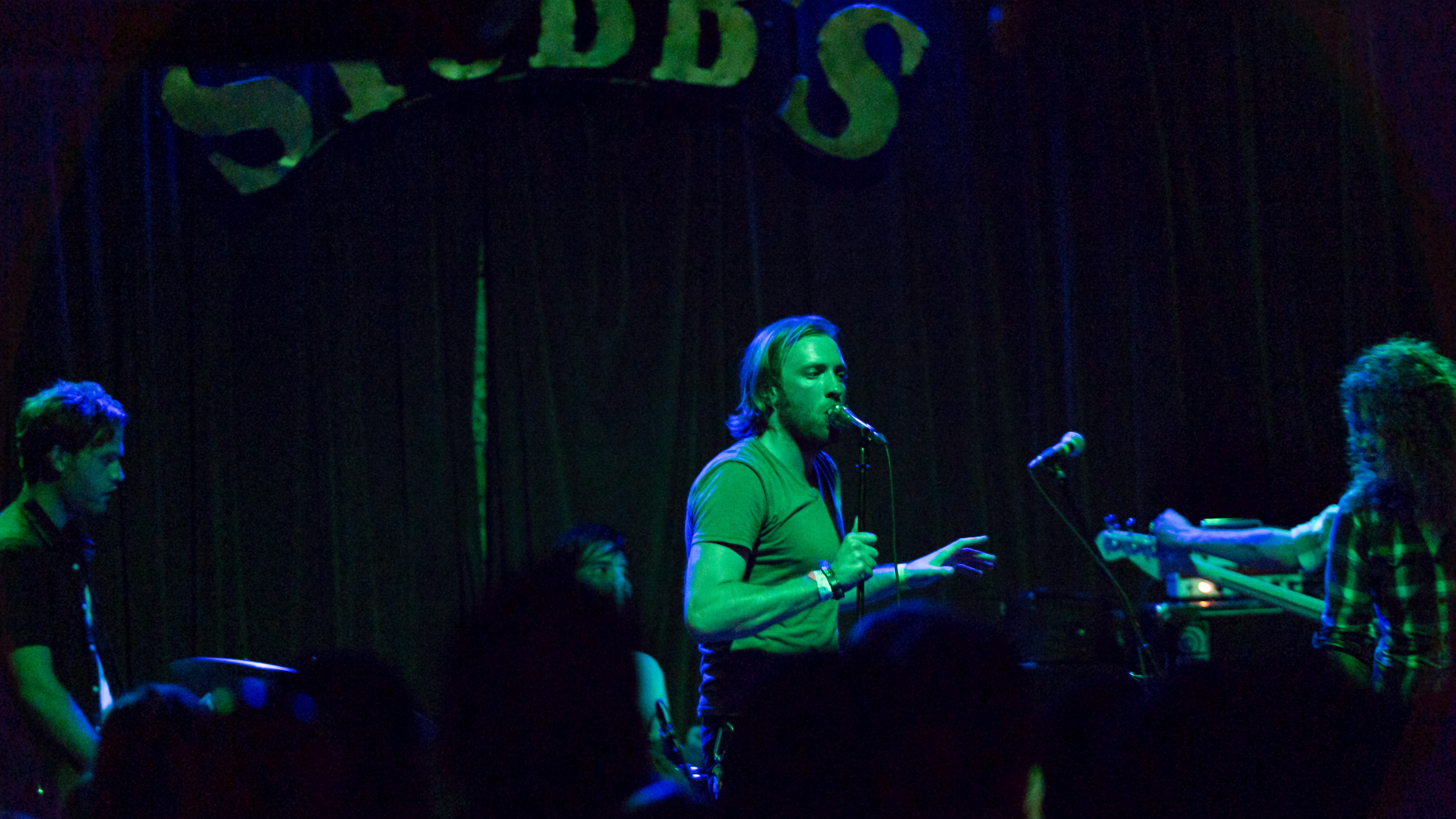
- Empires performing in 2014

Background information
- Origin: Chicago, Illinois, U.S.
- Genres: Indie rock; garage rock; alternative rock
- Years active: 2008–2015
- Labels: Island; Chop Shop; History
- Past members: Sean Van Vleet: Tom Conrad; Max Steger; Mike Robinson
- Website: Official website at the Wayback Machine (archived April 8, 2015)

Empires was an indie rock band from Chicago. The band consisted of Tom Conrad, Sean Van Vleet, Max Steger, Al Smith and Mike Robinson.

== Background ==
In early 2008, Empires was formed when longtime friends guitarist Tom Conrad approached singer Sean Van Vleet about writing music together. Conrad and Van Vleet spent the year writing music together, and the induction of the other band members soon followed, Max Steger, Ryan Luciani and Al Smith. The band's name, "Empires", was thought of by Tom Conrad and Sean Van Vleet at the same time, albeit on opposite sides of Chicago (Tom was on the 'L' Train at the time, while Sean was at their shared apartment).

The band has consistently mentioned having a very DIY ethic when it comes to recording and releasing music with Max Steger as their producer / engineer, Tom Conrad as a designer and Sean Van Vleet as a writer. In 2014, the band's third full-length studio album, Orphan, was produced by John Congleton and released on Island Records / Chop Shop Records.

Empires made their national television debut on David Letterman on June 17, 2014.

Empires would have their song How good does it feel Featured on the NHL 15 Soundtrack in 2014.

Lead singer Sean Van Vleet confirmed in an Instagram comment on August 23, 2017, that the band was no longer making music.

== Discography ==
- HOWL (2008)
- BANG EP (2010)
- Garage Hymns (2012)
- How Good Does It Feel EP (2014)
- Orphan (2014)

== Tour history ==
Empires has performed and toured alongside such artists: Geographer, Alkaline Trio, Kaiser Chiefs, The Whigs, Augustines, Deerhunter, Saint Motel, A Silent Film, Death Cab for Cutie, The Temper Trap, Margot & the Nuclear So and So's, Black Francis, and Chain Gang of 1974.

- Austin City Limits Music Festival (2014)
- Bunbury Music Festival (2013)
- Big Guava Music Festival (2015)
- Bonnaroo Music Festival (2014)
- BottleRock Napa Valley (2014)
- Hangout Music Festival (2014)
- Forecastle Festival (2015)
- Lollapalooza (2012)
- LouFest (2014)
- South by Southwest (2014)
