= Garage Hymns =

Studio album by Empires (band)
- Released: June 12, 2012
- Genre: Alternative
- Length: 45:19
- Producer: Empires

Empires (band) chronology
Howl (2008)	Garage Hymns (2012)

Garage Hymns is the second full-length album by American indie-rock band Empires, released in 2012.

== Reception ==
Consequence of Sound called Garage Hymns "...Springsteen-esque classic rock earnestness as well as The Gaslight Anthem and The Killers in their best moments.".

RedEye stated that the "explosive 'Hell’s Heroes,' unveiled when Empires landed in the final four in Rolling Stone’s competition to land an unsigned band on its cover, demands a big venue from which to soar.".

The Phoenix wrote "Sean Van Vleet's voice brims with determined grit and a starry-eyed upper register — half Brian Fallon warble, half Eddie Vedder exuberance— while guitarists Tom Conrad and Max Steger bash out riffs informed by punk velocity, post-punk darkness, and a bar band's reckless abandon.".

== Track listing ==
No.	Title	Length
1.	"Can't Steal Your Heart Away"	3:21
2.	"Keep It Steady"	3:32
3.	"Hell's Heroes"	3:38
4.	"Night Is Young"	3:44
5.	"Runaway"	3:34
6.	"Shame"	4:10
7.	"Surrenderer"	3:42
8.	"Hard Times"	4:22
9.	"We Lost Magic"	4:00
10.	"Hitchhiker"	3:26
11.	"Lord Have Mercy"	4:30

== Personnel ==
- Words by Sean Van Vleet
- Music by Empires
- Produced, engineered & mixed by Max Steger
- Recorded at Thunderdome Studios, Chicago, IL
- Production Assistance and additional keyboards by Wil Masisak
- Mastered by Jeff Lipton at Peerless Mastering
- Boston, MA. Assistant Mastering Engineer: Maria Rice
- Artwork & photography by Tom Conrad
