= The Record Company =

American blues rock band

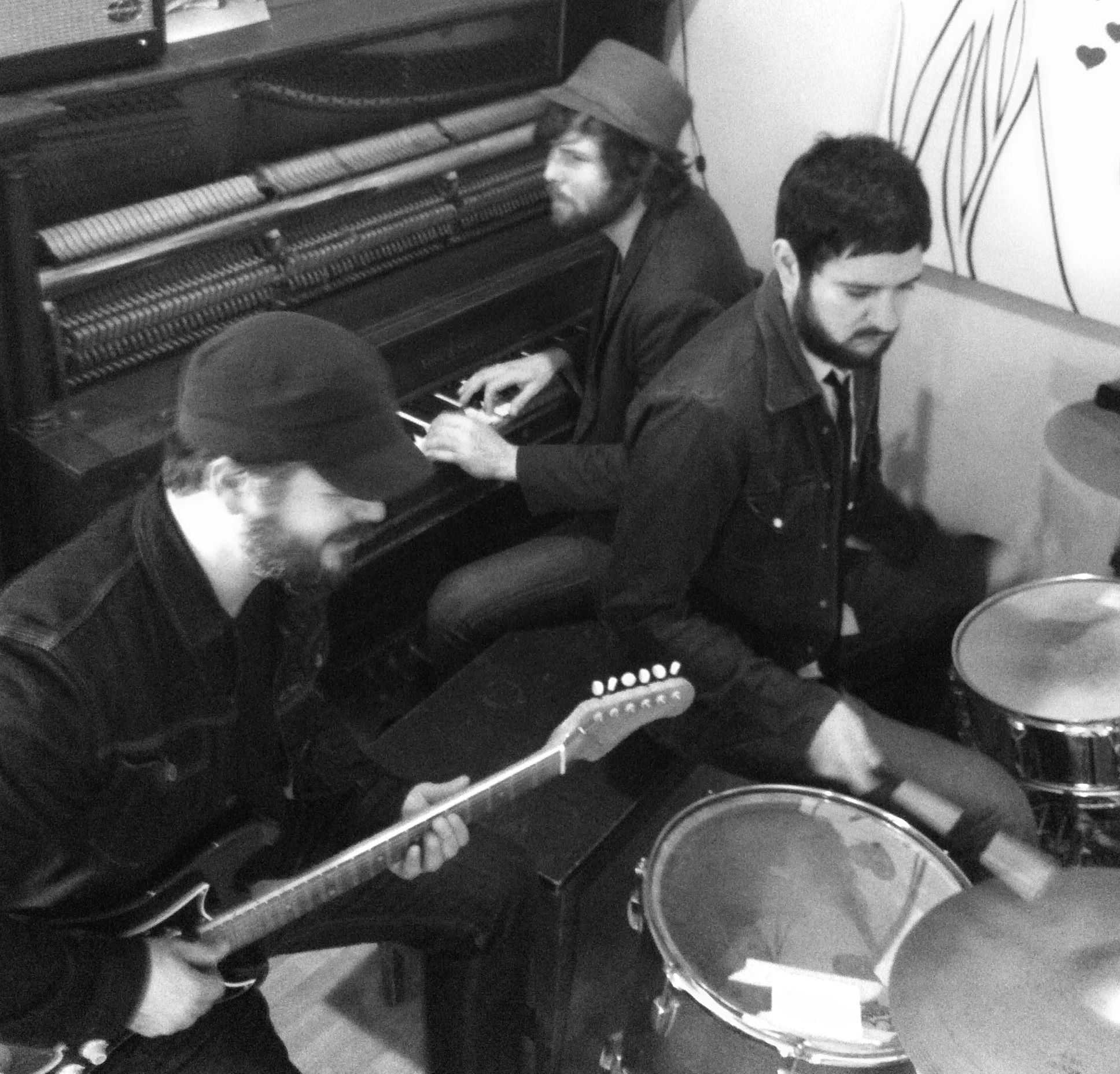
- From left: Chris Vos, Alex Stiff, Marc Cazorla

Background information
- Origin: Los Angeles, California, United States
- Genres: Rock and roll; rock; blues rock
- Years active: 2011–present
- Labels: Round Hill Records, Concord Records
- Members: Chris Vos; Alex Stiff; Marc Cazorla
- Website: www.therecordcompany.net

The Record Company is a Grammy-nominated blues rock band from Los Angeles. The members are Chris Vos (guitar, lead vocals), Alex Stiff (bass, backing vocals), and Marc Cazorla (drums, backing vocals). Their music is influenced by blues musicians such as John Lee Hooker.

The trio started in late 2011, recording live in bassist Alex Stiff's living room in Los Feliz, California. The Record Company have since played concert halls across North America, opening for John Mayer, B.B. King, Social Distortion, Buddy Guy, Bob Seger, Grace Potter, and Trombone Shorty. The band toured Europe supporting Blackberry Smoke in late 2015.

The band has received positive reviews from Entertainment Weekly, Paste, The Huffington Post, and Rolling Stone. Rolling Stone also included The Record Company in their April 2016 list of "10 New Artists You Need to Know."

== History ==
Prior to forming the Record Company, band members Stiff and Cazorla played together in the indie-rock band the Frequency.

=== Give It Back to You (2016–2017) ===
Their first full-length album Give It Back to You was released on Concord Records on February 12, 2016. The album was written, recorded, and mixed by the band in the same living room in the Los Feliz neighborhood of Los Angeles where the Record Company formed. The lead single, "Off the Ground", reached number 1 on the US Billboard Adult Alternative Songs chart. The album's second single, “Rita Mae Young,” reached number 12 on the Adult Alternative Songs chart. The album spent 42 weeks on both the Billboard Heatseekers Albums Chart and the Nielsen Alternative New Artist Chart and was nominated for a Grammy Award in the category of Best Contemporary Blues Album. Give It Back to You was nominated for Best Contemporary Blues Album in the 2017 Grammy Awards, losing to The Last Days of Oakland by Fantastic Negrito.

To promote Give It Back to You, the band appeared on The Late Show with Stephen Colbert, CBS This Morning and TBS’ Conan. The band were also favorites at the Bonnaroo Music & Arts Festival, prompting Rolling Stone Country to name the trio's set among the event's “5 Best Country and Americana Moments” while declaring it “a wildly energetic show and one of the most communal experiences of the festival.” The Record Company embarked on their first headline tour in the fall of 2016 in support of Give It Back to You, selling out 32 of the 41 shows they played. In July 2016, the song In The Mood For You was used in the motion picture soundtrack for the film Bad Moms. That was followed by a tour opening for John Mayer in early 2017. The band then toured Australia and Europe and made festival appearances.

=== All of this Life (2017–2020) ===
In the spring of 2017, they followed up with “Baby, I’m Broken,” which reached No. 6 on the Adult Alternative Songs chart. The song did not appear on any album. In June 2017 the band had two songs on the soundtrack for the independent film Live or Die in La Honda.

The band announced "Life to Fix", the lead single off their second studio album, All of This Life on April 8, 2018, on their Instagram. The song was later released on April 18, 2018, along with a lyric video. The song was praised by NPR and Rolling Stone. A music video was later released for the song on June 8, 2018. "Life to Fix" reached number one on the Adult Alternative Songs Chart.

All of This Life was released on June 22, 2018, and debuted at number 94 on the Billboard 200, selling 7,000 copies in its first week. It also peaked at number 9 on the Alternative Albums chart.

The nationwide The All of This Life Tour commenced on September 14, 2018, with two nights at The Fillmore in San Francisco, and concluded with a hometown play at Wiltern Theater.

The second single from the album, "Make It Happen", was released on September 19, 2018, along with a music video. In February 2019 the band performed Off The Ground on an episode of Last Call with Carson Daly.

On May 31, 2019, the band released a reimagined version of "You And Me Now" which was produced by T Bone Burnett exclusively on Amazon Music. A music video for the song was released on the band's YouTube channel on July 19, 2019.

=== Play Loud (2021-2022) ===
In June 2021, the band released an EP, entitled Side Project, which featured covers of songs by Willie Dixon, INXS, and Cypress Hill.

In July 2021, the band released the single and music video for "How High" and announced that their new studio album, Play Loud, would be released on October 8, 2021. "How High" peaked on the AAA radio chart at number 3 in October 2021. The single had multiple high-profile placements, including NFL game broadcasts, and was included on the MLB The Show 22 soundtrack.

Having been off the road since December 2019 due to the COVID-19 pandemic the band had spent more time writing and collaborating on the album than their previous releases. Produced by Dave Sardy, Play Loud expanded on the band's sound, incorporating more instruments than their core drum, bass, guitar sound from previous albums.

=== The 4th Album (2023) ===
On June 23, 2023, the band released a new single Talk To Me via streaming platforms, and followed up with a lyric video for the song that was released on July 20. Later in July the band announced via their social channels that they would be releasing a new studio album, entitled The 4th Album on September 15, 2023, via Round Hill Records. On August 19 the band released the song and accompanying music video for "Dance on Mondays."

== Band members ==
- Chris Vos – vocals, guitars, lap steel, pedal steel, harmonica
- Alex Stiff – bass, guitars, piano, vocals
- Marc Cazorla – drums, piano, vocals

== Discography ==
=== Studio albums ===
Title	Peak chart positions				Sales
Title	US 200	US Heat.	US Rock	US Alt.	Sales
Give It Back to You: Released: February 12, 2016; Label: Concord; Formats: LP, CD, digital download	—	5	23	17	
All of This Life: Released: June 22, 2018; Label: Concord / Universal; Formats: LP, CD, digital download	94	—	15	9	US: 7,000 (Debut)
Play Loud: Released: October 8, 2021; Label: Concord; Formats: LP, CD, digital download	—	—	—	—	
The 4th Album: Released: September 15, 2023; Label: Round Hill Records; Formats: LP, CD, digital download	—	—	—	—	
"—" denotes a recording that did not chart or was not released in that territory.

=== Singles ===
Title	Year	Peak chart positions			Album
Title	Year	US AAA	US Main.	US Rock Air.	Album
"Off the Ground"	2016	1	26	30	Give It Back to You
"Rita Mae Young"	2016	12	—	—	Give It Back to You
"On the Move"	2016	—	—	—	Give It Back to You
"Baby I'm Broken"	2017	6	—	46	Non-album single
"Life to Fix"	2018	1	27	31	All of This Life
"Make It Happen"	2018	9	—	—	All of This Life
"Goodbye to the Hard Life"	2019	—	—	—	All of This Life
"You and Me Now"	2019	—	—	—	All of This Life
"Ball & Chain"	2021	—	—	—	Non-album single
"How High"	2021	3	44	26	Play Loud
"Talk To Me"	2023	4	—	—	The 4th Album
"Dance on Mondays"	2023	—	—	—	The 4th Album
"Talk To Me"	2023	34	—	—	The 4th Album
"—" denotes a single that did not chart or was not released in that territory.

==== Vinyl singles and EPs ====
Title	Year	Formats	Label
"Don't Let Me Get Lonely"/"Born Unnamed"	2012	7" vinyl single	self-released
"This Crooked City"/"Tallahassee Lassie"	2012	7" vinyl single	Turntable Kitchen
Superdead EP	2012	digital & CD EP	self-released
Covers EP	2012	digital EP	self-released
Feels So Good EP	2013	digital & CD EP	self-released
Feels So Good EP Vinyl Edition	2014	12" vinyl EP	

== Appearances in media ==
- Their cover of The O'Jays' "Love Train" was featured in a 2012 Coors Light commercial
- "Feels So Good" was featured in USA's Suits in S3E05 (August 13, 2013)
- "Ain't Love Warm" was featured in USA's Suits in S3E05 (August 13, 2013) and S3E10 (September 17, 2013)
- "Feels So Good" featured in the theatrical trailer for Last Vegas (2013)
- "Baby I'm Broken" was featured in CBS's CSI: Crime Scene Investigation in Season 14, Episode 15: "Love for Sale" (February 19, 2014)
- "Rita Mae Young" featured in the BBC America show Orphan Black S2E04 - "Governed as It Were by Chance" (May 10, 2014)
- "Off the Ground" appears in a Miller Lite commercial, March 2015
- "Don't Let Me Get Lonely", "Feels So Good", and "In the Mood for You" featured in Showtime's Shameless
- "I Want Change" featured in ABC's Nashville
- "In the Mood for You" was used in the 2016 film Bad Moms.
- On March 7, 2016, The Record Company appeared on Conan, performing "Off the Ground" from their album Give It Back to You.
- In 2016 "Turn Me Loose" was featured at the end of the show during credits of the Netflix television series Bloodline Season 2 Episode 7.
- On May 20, 2017, The Record Company appeared on CBS This Morning, performing "Off the Ground" and "Baby I'm Broken" from their album Give It Back to You.
- "Off the Ground" is heard in Season 1 Episode 2 of CBS's Seal Team, October 2017.
- "Hard Day Coming Down" and "Never Gonna Cry For Me" appeared in the 2017 film Live or Die in La Honda.
- "How High" appears on the MLB The Show 22 soundtrack
- "Life To Fix" is heard in "The ROOKIE" Season 1 - Episode 20 of ABC's Free Fall, 6 April 2019.
