= Angel Baby (Dean Martin song) =

Single by Dean Martin
- B-side: "I'll Gladly Make the Same Mistake Again"
- Released: June 9, 1958
- Recorded: January 23, 1958
- Studio: Capitol Studios, Hollywood, California
- Genre: Traditional pop
- Length: 2:44
- Label: Capitol
- Songwriters: John Michael & Carl Niessen

Dean Martin singles chronology
"Return to Me" (1958)	"Angel Baby" (1958)	"Volare" (1958)

"Angel Baby" is a song released in 1958 by Dean Martin. The song reached No. 30 on the Billboard Hot 100, No. 38 on "The Cash Box Top 75", and No. 23 on Canada's CHUM Hit Parade.

== Chart performance ==
Chart (1958)	Peak position
US Billboard Hot 100	30
US Cash Box Top 75	38
Canada - CHUM Hit Parade	23
