= Life to Fix =

Single by The Record Company

from the album All of This Life
- Released: April 20, 2018
- Genre: Blues rock
- Length: 3:59
- Label: Concord; Universal

The Record Company singles chronology
"Baby I'm Broken" (2017)	"Life to Fix" (2018)	"Make it Happen" (2018)

"Life to Fix" is a song by the American alternative rock band The Record Company. The song is the lead single from their second studio album All of This Life, and was released on April 20, 2018.

== Release ==
On April 14, 2018, the band announced that they had finished recording their new album. Two days later, on April 16, the band released a teaser for the song on their Instagram and announced that it would be coming out on April 20.

== Reception ==
NPR described "Life to Fix" as a track that "takes off like a supersonic jet blowing wildly through the universe of rock," adding, "It's got seventh-inning stretch stadium rock anthem written all over it."

"Rolling Stone" named it one of their "10 Best Country and Americana Songs of the Week" for the week of April 20, 2018, describing it as "a rough-and-tumble ode to hitting rock bottom and building yourself 'back up, brick by brick.'"

== Promotion ==
"Life to Fix was sent to adult album alternative stations on April 30, 2018, and to active rock stations a day later on May 1, 2018.

== Music video ==
A lyric video for the song was released on April 18, 2018.

== Track list ==
=== CD single ===
No.	Title	Length
1.	"Life to Fix"	3:59
2.	"Life to Fix" (Radio Edit)	3:17
3.	"Life to Fix" (Acoustic)	3:58
4.	"Baby I'm Broken" (Acoustic)	3:35
Total length:		14:49

=== Digital download ===
No.	Title	Length
1.	"Life to Fix"	3:59
2.	"Life to Fix" (Radio Edit)	3:17
Total length:		7:16

== Charts ==
Chart (2018)	Peak position
US Adult Alternative Airplay (Billboard)	1
US Mainstream Rock (Billboard)	27
