= Mr. Lucky (Chris Isaak album) =

Studio album by Chris Isaak
- Released: February 24, 2009
- Recorded: 2008
- Studio: SquawkBox Studio, Ballroom Studios, Los Angeles, California; Henson Recording, Hollywood, California; Studio 880, Oakland, California; and Starstruck Studios, Nashville, Tennessee.
- Genre: Rock and roll
- Length: 47:44
- Label: Wicked Game/Reprise
- Producer: Eric Rosse, John Shanks, Mark Needham, Chris Isaak

Chris Isaak chronology
Live in Australia (2008)	Mr. Lucky (2009)	Live at the Fillmore (2010)

Professional ratings
Aggregate scores
Source	Rating
Metacritic	72/100
Review scores
Source	Rating
Allmusic	4/5 stars
Boston Globe	80/100
NOW	3/5

Mr. Lucky is the tenth studio album by American rock musician Chris Isaak. The record was released on February 24, 2009 via Wicked Game/Reprise labels.

== Track listing ==
All tracks are written by Chris Isaak; except where indicated.

No.	Title	Writer(s)	Length
1.	"Cheater's Town"		3:37
2.	"We Let Her Down"		3:21
3.	"You Don't Cry Like I Do"		4:11
4.	"We've Got Tomorrow"		2:22
5.	"Breaking Apart" (duet with Trisha Yearwood)	Chris Isaak, Diane Warren	3:39
6.	"Baby Baby"		3:15
7.	"Mr. Lonely Man"		2:41
8.	"I Lose My Heart" (duet with Michelle Branch)		2:57
9.	"Summer Holiday"		3:05
10.	"Best I Ever Had"		4:11
11.	"We Lost Our Way"		3:38
12.	"Very Pretty Girl"		4:20
13.	"Take My Heart"		2:23
14.	"Big Wide Wonderful World"		4:04
Total length:			47:44

Bonus tracks
No.	Title	Length
15.	"I Got It Bad"	4:21
16.	"Dream Deferred"	3:03
17.	"She"	4:01
18.	"Movie Star Is Sleeping"	3:04
19.	"Keep the Heartache Real"	3:24
20.	"Blues Has Found Us"	3:19
Total length:		68:56

- Bonus tracks "I Got It Bad" and "Dream Deferred" were available through ChrisIsaak.com. "She", "Movie Star Is Sleeping", and "Keep the Heartache Real" are available on iTunes and Amazon.com. "Blues Has Found Us" is available exclusively on iTunes.

== Personnel ==
Musicians

- Chris Isaak – lead vocals, rhythm guitar, bass guitar, acoustic guitar

Artwork

- Chris Isaak – artwork
- Stephen Walker – art direction and album design
- Matt Coonrod – design
- Neal Preston – photography

Additional Musicians

- Scott Plunkett – keyboards
- Kenney Dale Johnson – drums
- Nick Lashley, John Shanks, Greg Leisz, Brian MacLeod, Stuart Mathis, Jamie Muhoberac, Lee Thornburg. Waddy Wachtel, Patrick Warren, Bruce Watson – additional personnel

Production

- Eric Rosse, Chris Isaak, John Shanks, Mark Needham – producers
- Will Brierre, Chris Reynolds, Rafael Serrano, Chad Carlson, Aaron Kasdorf, & Howard Christopher Willing – engineers
- Mark Needham – mixing
- Stephen Marcussen – mastering at Marcussen Mastering
- Brian Gardner – mastering on tracks: 2, 11, 12

Management

- Howard Kaufman & Sheryl Louis – management for HK Management Group

== Charts ==
Chart (2009)	Peak position
Australian Albums Chart	11
Belgian Albums Chart (Flanders)	42
US Billboard 200	29
US Billboard Digital Albums	29
US Billboard Rock Albums	10
US Billboard Tastemakers Albums	11
