= Joe Melson =

American singer and songwriter (1935–2026)

- Melson in 2015

Background information
- Born: May 11, 1935; Bonham, Texas, U.S.
- Died: July 1, 2026 (aged 91) Nashville, Tennessee, U.S.
- Genres: Pop, country, rockabilly
- Occupations: Songwriter, singer, musician
- Instrument: Vocals
- Years active: 1959–2026

Claudie Joe Melson (May 11, 1935 – July 1, 2026) was an American singer and a BMI Award-winning songwriter best known for his collaborations with Roy Orbison, including "Only the Lonely" and "Crying", which are both in the Grammy Hall of Fame and have both been included in Rolling Stone's 500 Greatest Songs of All Time. Melson was inducted into the Nashville Songwriters Hall of Fame in 2018.

== Life and career ==
Joe Melson was born in Bonham, Texas, on May 11, 1935. He was raised on a farm until he was sixteen. He attended high school in Gore, Oklahoma, and in Chicago, Illinois, before he returned to Texas to study at the two-year Odessa College in Odessa, the seat of Ector County. He studied and played music as a teenager and fronted a rockabilly band called the Cavaliers.

Beginning in 1959, first at his home in Midland, Texas, and then in Nashville, Tennessee, Melson teamed up with Roy Orbison, who had just joined Monument Records, with whom he would soon write a string of hits. Before their collaboration, Orbison had been solely a rockabilly performer. Although Melson himself was rooted in that music genre, he had begun writing rhythm and blues songs. Melson recognized the potential in Orbison's voice, encouraging the singer to explore its power through their first collaboration, "Only the Lonely". What resulted on March 25, 1960, was arguably the first operatic rock ballad. The song went to No. 2 on the Billboard Hot 100 chart in the United States, and to No. 1 in the UK Singles Chart, launching Orbison to international musical stardom.

Not only did that song influence Orbison to write such operatic ballads as "In Dreams", but a few months later it also inspired Orbison's friend Elvis Presley to record "It's Now or Never," based on the Neapolitan art song "'O sole mio".

Melson and Orbison followed up with similar sounds such as the dramatic "Running Scared" that went to No. 1 in the US. His last hit collaboration with Orbison came in 1963 with the writing of "Blue Bayou", although some of their cooperative efforts would be recorded in later years. The two got together again between 1971 and 1975.

Their collaboration produced such songs as:

- "Up Town" (1960, No. 72 Billboard pop chart)
- "Only the Lonely" (1960, No. 2)
- "Blue Angel" (1960, No. 9)
- "I'm Hurtin'" (1961, No. 27)
- "Running Scared" (1961, No. 1)
- "Crying" (1961, No. 2)
- "The Crowd" (1962, No. 26)
- "The Actress" (1962)
- "Lana" (1962)
- "Blue Bayou" (1963, No. 29)

Between 1960 and 1963, Melson recorded several singles of his own (the best known being "Hey Mister Cupid") for Hickory Records and also through Acuff-Rose Music, wrote songs for some of that label's other artists including Dan Folger. He then recorded a few songs for EMP Records in 1964 and 1965 that achieved limited success. He was the cowriter of "Run, Baby Run (Back Into My Arms)", which was a No. 12 Billboard hit for The Newbeats, released in 1965. Melson co-wrote a top-30 country hit for Don Gibson in 1968 and then co-wrote two songs that were top-30 country hits for Glenn Barber in 1972, with a third in 1979.

"Only the Lonely" went to number one on the country charts in 1969 for Sonny James. "Blue Bayou" was a No. 3 hit for Linda Ronstadt in 1977 and "Crying" was a top-10 hit for Don McLean in 1981.

Over the years, Melson continued to perform at rockabilly and nostalgia festivals, and in 2002 he was inducted into the International Rock-A-Billy Hall of Fame in Jackson, Tennessee.

In August 2014, Melson released a triple-A sided single "Last Goodbye" / "Fields of Gold" / "Girl Back on Blue Bayou", with Australian artist Damien Leith.

Melson died at his home in Nashville on July 1, 2026, at the age of 91.
