= Baby Did a Bad Bad Thing =

1995 single by Chris Isaak

- Enhanced CD edition of 1999 reissue single

Single by Chris Isaak

from the album Forever Blue
- B-side: "I Wonder"; "Wicked Game"
- Released: September 11, 1995
- Genre: Rockabilly
- Length: 2:55; 3:49 (remix)
- Label: Reprise; WEA
- Songwriter: Chris Isaak
- Producer: Erik Jacobsen

Chris Isaak singles chronology
"Go Walking Down There" (1995)	"Baby Did a Bad Bad Thing" (1995)	"Think of Tomorrow" (1996)

Music video
- "Baby Did a Bad Bad Thing" by Chris Isaak on YouTube

"Baby Did a Bad Bad Thing" is a song by American musician Chris Isaak, released as the first track to the 1995 album Forever Blue. Filled with sensuality and erotic imagery, the song was described by Isaak as a declaration to "Somebody who is so evil and twisted and bad, and yet, you still want them." The title evokes how "That's a bad bad thing" is used both by parents scolding misbehaving children and by adults during sexual intercourse. In September 1999, a remix of the song peaked at number nine on the Australian ARIA Singles Chart, outperforming the number-27 peak of the original. In the United States, the 1999 reissue reached number three on the Billboard Triple-A chart.

== Background ==
Similar to how Isaak's "Wicked Game" only became a success following its inclusion in Wild at Heart (1990), the song got most of its mainstream recognition after being featured in the 1999 Stanley Kubrick film Eyes Wide Shut, starring Tom Cruise and Nicole Kidman. Kubrick heard the song as Kidman listened to Isaak's music to liven up during rehearsals. Isaak was asked for his approval as he prepared to perform on The Tonight Show, and immediately agreed once he was told it was for Kubrick, who Isaak declared, "Hasn't done a film I didn't like." The singer said he always considered "Baby Did a Bad Bad Thing" ripe for soundtracks due to being "kind of a strange piece of work, with a really driving beat and a manic energy that I thought would probably work well for some visuals". David Kahne remixed the track for the Eyes Wide Shut trailers and television spots, and the redone version was released as a radio single on June 22, 1999. Isaak has approved of the remix, feeling it was "more rocking and everything sounds louder".

== Music video ==
The music video of the song was commissioned after its inclusion on Eyes Wide Shut, and directed by Herb Ritts, who also did the video for Isaak's "Wicked Game." It features French model Laetitia Casta videotaped in a motel room gyrating sexually being watched by Isaak. Casta was dressed in lingerie and wore a black wig throughout the video. In July 1999, VH1 aired two versions of the music video, the censored version was played before 9 p.m. and the uncensored version was played after 9 p.m. The video was initially regarded as too steamy by the network. The video was ranked number 28 on VH1's 50 Sexiest Video Moments.

== Charts ==
=== Weekly charts ===
Chart (1995)	Peak position
Australia (ARIA)	27

Chart (1999)	Peak position
Australia (ARIA)	9
Canada Adult Contemporary (RPM)	17
Scottish Singles Sales (Official Charts)	42
UK Singles (Official Charts)	44
US Bubbling Under Hot 100 (Billboard)	25
US Adult Alternative Airplay (Billboard)	3
US Adult Pop Airplay (Billboard)	29

=== Year-end charts ===
Chart (1999)	Position
Australia (ARIA)	59
Canada Adult Contemporary (RPM)	99
US Triple-A (Billboard)	18

== Certifications ==
Region	Certification	Certified units/sales
Australia (ARIA)	Gold	35,000^{^}
^{^} Shipments figures based on certification alone.

== Release history ==
Region	Version	Date	Format(s)	Label(s)	Ref.
Australia	Original	September 11, 1995	Cassette	Reprise; WEA	
United States	Remix	July 6, 1999	Adult contemporary; hot AC; contemporary hit radio	Reprise; Warner Sunset	
Australia	Remix	July 19, 1999	CD	Reprise; Warner Sunset	
United Kingdom	Remix	September 20, 1999	CD; cassette	Reprise	
