= Baja Sessions =

Studio album by Chris Isaak
- Released: October 8, 1996
- Recorded: 1995–1996
- Genres: Rock and roll; country
- Length: 39:02
- Label: Reprise
- Producer: Erik Jacobsen

Chris Isaak chronology
Forever Blue (1995)	Baja Sessions (1996)	Speak of the Devil (1998)

Professional ratings
Review scores
Source	Rating
AllMusic	4/5 stars
Chicago Tribune	1/4 stars
Christgau's Consumer Guide	(dud)
The Encyclopedia of Popular Music	2/5 stars
Entertainment Weekly	D
Orlando Sentinel	4/5 stars
Pitchfork	8.2/10

Baja Sessions is the sixth studio album by Chris Isaak, released in 1996, featuring largely acoustic arrangements. The album contains a large number of covers, many of which are classic songs (such as the Hawaiian-tinged "Sweet Leilani" and "South of the Border (Down Mexico Way)") which refer to, or are styled to suggest, tropical, laid-back settings. Though its title refers to Baja California, the album was recorded at San Francisco's Coast Recorders.

A 58-minute documentary was released featuring Isaak performing the songs as well as making amusing asides, surfing and generally mucking around.

== Track listing ==
No.	Title	Writer(s)	Album	Length
1.	"Pretty Girls Don't Cry"	Chris Isaak	Silvertone (1985)	3:09
2.	"Back On Your Side"	Chris Isaak	Silvertone (1985)	3:04
3.	"Only The Lonely"	Joe Melson, Roy Orbison		2:53
4.	"South of the Border (Down Mexico Way)"	Jimmy Kennedy, Michael Carr		3:10
5.	"I Wonder"	Chris Isaak		2:56
6.	"Wrong To Love You"	Chris Isaak	Heart Shaped World (1989)	3:55
7.	"Waiting For My Lucky Day"	Chris Isaak		2:38
8.	"Yellow Bird"	Alan Bergman, Marilyn Bergman, Norman Luboff		2:29
9.	"Two Hearts"	Chris Isaak	San Francisco Days (1993)	3:19
10.	"Return to Me"	Danny DiMinno, Carmen Lombardo		2:17
11.	"Dancin'"	Chris Isaak	Silvertone (1985)	3:57
12.	"Sweet Leilani"	Harry Owens		2:17
13.	"Think Of Tomorrow"	Chris Isaak		2:58

== Personnel ==
- Chris Isaak – vocals, guitar
- Hershel Yatovitz – lead guitar
- Rowland Salley – bass, vocals
- Kenney Dale Johnson – drums

== Sales and certifications ==
Region	Certification	Certified units/sales
United States (RIAA)	Gold	556,000
