= Only the Lonely =

1960 song written by Roy Orbison and Joe Melson

- scan of record label Monument 45-421

Single by Roy Orbison

from the album Lonely and Blue
- B-side: "Here Comes That Song Again"
- Published: May 4, 1960 Acuff-Rose Publications, Inc.
- Released: May 9, 1960
- Recorded: March 25, 1960
- Studio: RCA Victor Studio B, Nashville
- Genre: Pop; rock and roll
- Length: 2:27
- Label: Monument
- Songwriters: Roy Orbison, Joe Melson
- Producer: Fred Foster

Roy Orbison singles chronology
"Up Town" (1959)	"Only the Lonely" (1960)	"Blue Angel" (1960)

"Only the Lonely" (also titled "Only the Lonely (Know the Way I Feel)") is a 1960 song written by Roy Orbison and Joe Melson. Produced by Fred Foster for Monument Records, it was the first major hit for Orbison, and it established his trademark sound. It was described by The New York Times as expressing "a clenched, driven urgency". Released as a 45 rpm single by Monument Records in May 1960, "Only the Lonely" went to number 2 on the United States Billboard pop music charts on July 25, 1960, and number 14 on the Billboard R&B charts. "Only the Lonely" reached number 1 in the United Kingdom, a position it achieved on October 20, 1960, staying there for two weeks (out of a total of twenty-four weeks spent on the UK singles chart). "Only the Lonely" was the longest charting single of Orbison's career. Personnel on the original recording included Orbison's drummer Larry Parks, plus Nashville A-Team regulars Floyd Cramer on piano, Bob Moore on bass, and Hank Garland and Harold Bradley on guitars, Joe Melson and the Anita Kerr Singers on backing vocals. Drummer Buddy Harman played on the rest of the songs on the session.

In 1999, the 1960 recording of "Only the Lonely" by Roy Orbison on Monument Records was inducted into the Grammy Hall of Fame.

== Development ==
After several years without much success in the music business, and sharing a tiny apartment with his wife and new baby, Roy Orbison had taken to sitting in his car to write songs when, in 1958, his acquaintance Joe Melson tapped on the car window and suggested they collaborate. With Chet Atkins producing, they recorded several songs for RCA Victor, only two of which were deemed worthy of release. Wesley Rose brought Orbison to the attention of producer Fred Foster at Monument Records. There, Orbison would become one of the first recording artists to popularize the "Nashville sound".

In his first session for Monument in Nashville, Orbison recorded "Paper Boy" (a song that RCA Victor had previously refused) while sound engineer Bill Porter experimented with close miking the doo-wop backing singers. Orbison requested a string section to perform in the studio, to augment the Nashville sound. The resulting recording had a "polished, professional sound ... finally allow[ing] Orbison's stylistic inclinations free rein". With this combination, Orbison recorded three new songs, the most notable of which was "Uptown". Impressed with the results, Melson later recalled, "We stood in the studio, listening to the playbacks, and thought it was the most beautiful sound in the world." However, "Uptown" only reached number 72 on the Billboard Hot 100, and Orbison set his sights on negotiating a contract with an upscale nightclub somewhere.

In early 1960, Orbison and Joe Melson wrote one more song, "Only the Lonely", which they tried to sell to Elvis Presley and the Everly Brothers, who turned it down. (The song was subtitled "Know the Way I Feel" to avoid confusion with another song called "Only the Lonely", which Sammy Cahn and Jimmy Van Heusen had written for Frank Sinatra in 1958.)

Instead, they recorded "Only the Lonely" themselves at RCA's Nashville studio, using the string section and doo-wop backing singers that had given "Uptown" such an impressive sound. But this time, sound engineer Bill Porter tried a completely new strategy: building the mix from the top down rather than from the bottom up, beginning with close-miked backing vocals in the foreground, and ending with the rhythm section soft in the background. This combination was to become Orbison's trademark sound.

The recording also featured a falsetto note hit by Orbison that showcased a surprisingly powerful voice. According to biographer Alan Clayson, it "came not from his throat but deeper within". The song differed from the typical verse–chorus form structure of popular music of the time, building and falling to a climax, with emotional expression then rare for masculine performance.

The single shot to number 2 on the Billboard Hot 100, hit number 1 in the UK and was a Top 10 hit in a number of other countries. According to Orbison, he and Melson then began constructing songs with Orbison's voice in mind, specifically to showcase its range and power. He told Rolling Stone in 1988, "I liked the sound of [my voice]. I liked making it sing, making the voice ring, and I just kept doing it. And I think that somewhere between the time of "Ooby Dooby" and "Only the Lonely", it kind of turned into a good voice." Instantly Orbison was in high demand. He appeared on American Bandstand and toured the U.S. for three months with Patsy Cline. When Presley heard "Only the Lonely" for the first time, the song he had turned down, he bought a box of the records to give out to his friends.

== Personnel ==
- Roy Orbison – vocals
- Hank Garland – guitar
- Harold Bradley – guitar
- Bob Moore – double bass
- Floyd Cramer – piano
- Buddy Harman – drums
- Anita Kerr Singers – backing vocals
- Joe Melson – backing vocals
- Bob Moore's Orchestra – orchestra

== Charts ==
Chart (1960–61)	Peak position
Australia (Kent Music Report)	5
Belgium (Ultratop 50 Flanders)	6
Belgium (Ultratop 50 Wallonia)	16
Canada (CHUM)	2
Ireland (Evening Herald)	2
Netherlands (Single Top 100)	7
New Zealand (Lever Hit Parade)	2
Norway (VG-lista)	4
UK Disc Top 20	1
UK Melody Maker Top 20	1
UK New Musical Express Top 30	1
UK Record Mirror Top 20	1
UK Record Retailer Top 50	1
US Billboard Hot 100	2
US Hot R&B/Hip-Hop Songs (Billboard)	14
US Cash Box Top 100	2

== Certifications ==
Certifications for "Only the Lonely"
Region	Certification	Certified units/sales
New Zealand (RMNZ)	Gold	15,000^{‡}
United Kingdom (BPI)	Silver	200,000^{‡}
^{‡} Sales+streaming figures based on certification alone.

== Cover versions ==
In 1969, country singer Sonny James recorded the song and had a number 1 hit on the Billboard country music charts. In Canada, it reached number 1 on the country charts and number 93 on the rock charts.

Chris Isaak included an acoustic cover of the song in his 1996 album Baja Sessions.

== In popular culture ==
- Orbison's version of his song has been used in motion pictures, including The Love Letter (1999) and Only the Lonely (1991).
- Bruce Springsteen referred to the song in his 1975 song "Thunder Road", and when inducting Orbison into the Rock and Roll Hall of Fame in 1987, Springsteen said, "In '75, when I went into the studio to make Born to Run, I wanted to make a record with words like Bob Dylan that sounded like Phil Spector, but most of all I wanted to sing like Roy Orbison." Springsteen originally intended to begin his album with an alarm clock followed by Orbison's song playing over the radio.
