= Speak of the Devil (Chris Isaak album) =

1998 studio album by Chris Isaak

Studio album by Chris Isaak
- Released: 22 September 1998
- Recorded: 1997–1998
- Genres: Rockabilly; roots rock
- Length: 44:55
- Label: Reprise
- Producers: Erik Jacobsen; Chris Isaak; Rob Cavallo

Chris Isaak chronology
Baja Sessions (1996)	Speak of the Devil (1998)	Always Got Tonight (2002)

Singles from Speak of the Devil
- 1. "Please" Released: 1998

Professional ratings
Review scores
Source	Rating
AllMusic	3.5/5 stars
The Encyclopedia of Popular Music	2/5 stars
Entertainment Weekly	B+
Los Angeles Times	3.5/4 stars
Pitchfork	5.7/10

Speak of the Devil is the seventh studio album by the American rock musician Chris Isaak, released in 1998. The song "Black Flowers" is featured at the end of the sixth episode, first season, of "The Penguin" HBO series (S1E06).

== Track listing ==
All tracks are written by Chris Isaak, except "Breaking Apart" by Isaak and Diane Warren.

No.	Title	Length
1.	"Please"	3:34
2.	"Flying"	3:08
3.	"Walk Slow"	3:01
4.	"Breaking Apart"	3:45
5.	"This Time"	3:13
6.	"Speak of the Devil"	3:31
7.	"Like the Way She Moves"	2:50
8.	"Wanderin'"	2:42
9.	"Don't Get So Down on Yourself"	3:11
10.	"Black Flowers"	2:44
11.	"I'm Not Sleepy"	2:37
12.	"7 Lonely Nights"	2:10
13.	"Talkin' 'Bout a Home"	4:45
14.	"Super Magic 2000"	3:45
Total length:		44:55

== Personnel ==
- Chris Isaak – vocals, guitar
- Hershel Yatovitz – guitar, vocals
- Rowland Salley – bass, vocals
- Kenney Dale Johnson – drums, vocals

with:

- Rob Cavallo – additional guitar on "Please" and "Walk Slow"
- Curt Bisquera, Cynthia Corra, Dave Palmer, Frank Martin, Jamie Muhoberac, Jimmy Pugh, John Pierce, Julie Lorch, Mark Needham, Mary Dunaway, Matt Chamberlain, Patrick Warren, Steve Ferrone, Terry Wood, Weddy Waller – additional musicians

Technical

- Chris Lord-Alge (tracks 1, 2, 5–8, 11), Mark Needham (tracks 3, 4, 9, 10, 12–14) – mixing
- Chris Isaak (tracks 4–6, 9, 12–14), Erik Jacobsen (tracks 1–3, 7–12), Rob Cavallo (track 4) – producer
- Melanie Nissen – photography

== Charts ==
Chart (1998)	Peak position
Australian Albums (ARIA)	11
French Albums (SNEP)	34
German Albums (Offizielle Top 100)	99
New Zealand Albums (RMNZ)	19
Norwegian Albums (VG-lista)	37
Swedish Albums (Sverigetopplistan)	39
US Billboard 200	41

== Sales and certifications ==
Region	Certification	Certified units/sales
United States (RIAA)	Gold	392,000
