= Forever Blue (Chris Isaak album) =

Studio album by Chris Isaak
- Released: May 23, 1995
- Studio: Studio D and Dave Wellhausen Recording, San Francisco
- Genre: Rockabilly
- Length: 39:48
- Label: Reprise
- Producer: Erik Jacobsen

Chris Isaak chronology
San Francisco Days (1993)	Forever Blue (1995)	Baja Sessions (1996)

Singles from Forever Blue
- 1. "Somebody's Crying" Released: May 15, 1995; 2. "Baby Did a Bad, Bad Thing" Released: September 11, 1995; 3. "Go Walking Down There" Released: 1995

Professional ratings
Review scores
Source	Rating
AllMusic	4.5/5 stars
Chicago Tribune	3/4 stars
Christgau's Consumer Guide	(neither)
The Encyclopedia of Popular Music	3/5 stars
Entertainment Weekly	B+
Los Angeles Times	3/4 stars
NME	7/10
Orlando Sentinel	4/5 stars

Forever Blue is the fifth studio album by American rock and roll musician Chris Isaak, released on May 23, 1995. The album included three singles: the Grammy-nominated "Somebody's Crying," "Baby Did a Bad Bad Thing," featured in Stanley Kubrick's final film, Eyes Wide Shut and "Graduation Day," featured in the 1996 film Beautiful Girls. In 1996, Forever Blue was also nominated for a Grammy Award for Best Rock Album, though it lost to Alanis Morissette's Jagged Little Pill.

In 2014, Melissa Hollick released a cover of "I Believe" for the video game Wolfenstein: The New Order.

== Track listing ==
All songs written by Chris Isaak.

1. "Baby Did a Bad Bad Thing" – 2:54
2. "Somebody's Crying" – 2:46
3. "Graduation Day" – 3:11
4. "Go Walking Down There" – 2:49
5. "Don't Leave Me on My Own" – 2:14
6. "Things Go Wrong" – 3:00
7. "Forever Blue" – 2:42
8. "There She Goes" – 3:14
9. "Goin' Nowhere" – 2:52
10. "Changed Your Mind" – 3:51
11. "Shadows in a Mirror" – 3:59
12. "I Believe" – 3:09
13. "The End of Everything" – 3:05

== Personnel ==
- Chris Isaak – vocals, guitar
- Rowland Salley – bass, vocals
- Kenney Dale Johnson – drums, vocals
- Bruce Kaphan – pedal steel guitar
- Jimmy Pugh – Hammond B3 organ
- Johnny Reno – saxophone, vocals
- Jeff Watson – lead guitar
- Gregg Arreguin – guitar

== Charts ==
Chart (1995)	Peak position
Australian Albums Chart	2
Belgian (Flanders) Albums Chart	37
Belgian (Wallonia) Albums Chart	32
Dutch Albums Chart	46
French SNEP Albums Chart	19
German Albums Chart	55
New Zealand RIANZ Albums Chart	7
Norwegian Albums Chart	31
Swedish Albums Chart	9
Swiss Albums Chart	40
UK Albums Chart	27
Billboard 200	31

== Sales and certifications ==
Region	Certification	Certified units/sales
Australia (ARIA)	3× Platinum	210,000^{^}
Canada (Music Canada)	Gold	50,000^{^}
United States (RIAA)	Platinum	1,200,000
^{^} Shipments figures based on certification alone.
