= Always Got Tonight =

Studio album by Chris Isaak
- Released: February 12, 2002
- Genre: Rockabilly
- Length: 43:43
- Label: Reprise
- Producer: John Shanks

Chris Isaak chronology
Speak of the Devil (1998)	Always Got Tonight (2002)	Christmas (2004)

Singles from Always Got Tonight
- 1. "Let Me Down Easy" Released: January 7, 2002; 2. "One Day" Released: May 20, 2002

Professional ratings
Aggregate scores
Source	Rating
Metacritic	70/100
Review scores
Source	Rating
AllMusic	3/5 stars
Rolling Stone	3.5/5 stars

Always Got Tonight is the eighth studio album by Chris Isaak. It was released in 2002 through Reprise Records.

== Track listing ==
All tracks composed by Chris Isaak; except where indicated

1. "One Day"
2. "Let Me Down Easy"
3. "Worked It Out Wrong"
4. "Courthouse"
5. "Life Will Go On"
6. "Always Got Tonight"
7. "Cool Love" (Isaak, John Shanks)
8. "Notice the Ring"
9. "I See You Everywhere"
10. "American Boy"
11. "Somebody to Love"
12. "Nothing to Say"

== Personnel ==
- Chris Isaak – vocals, guitar
- Hershel Yatovitz – guitar
- Rowland Salley – bass
- Kenney Dale Johnson – drums

with:

- Abraham Laboriel, Jamie Muhoberac, Jimmy Pugh, John Shanks, Lenny Castro, Matt Eakle, Patrick Warren, Paul Bushnell, Steve Ferrone – additional musicians
- Millie Seeboth, Minnie Driver – backing vocals
- Patrick Warren – string arrangement on "Cool Love"

== Sales ==
Region	Certification	Certified units/sales
United States	—	340,000
