= List of Exodus members =

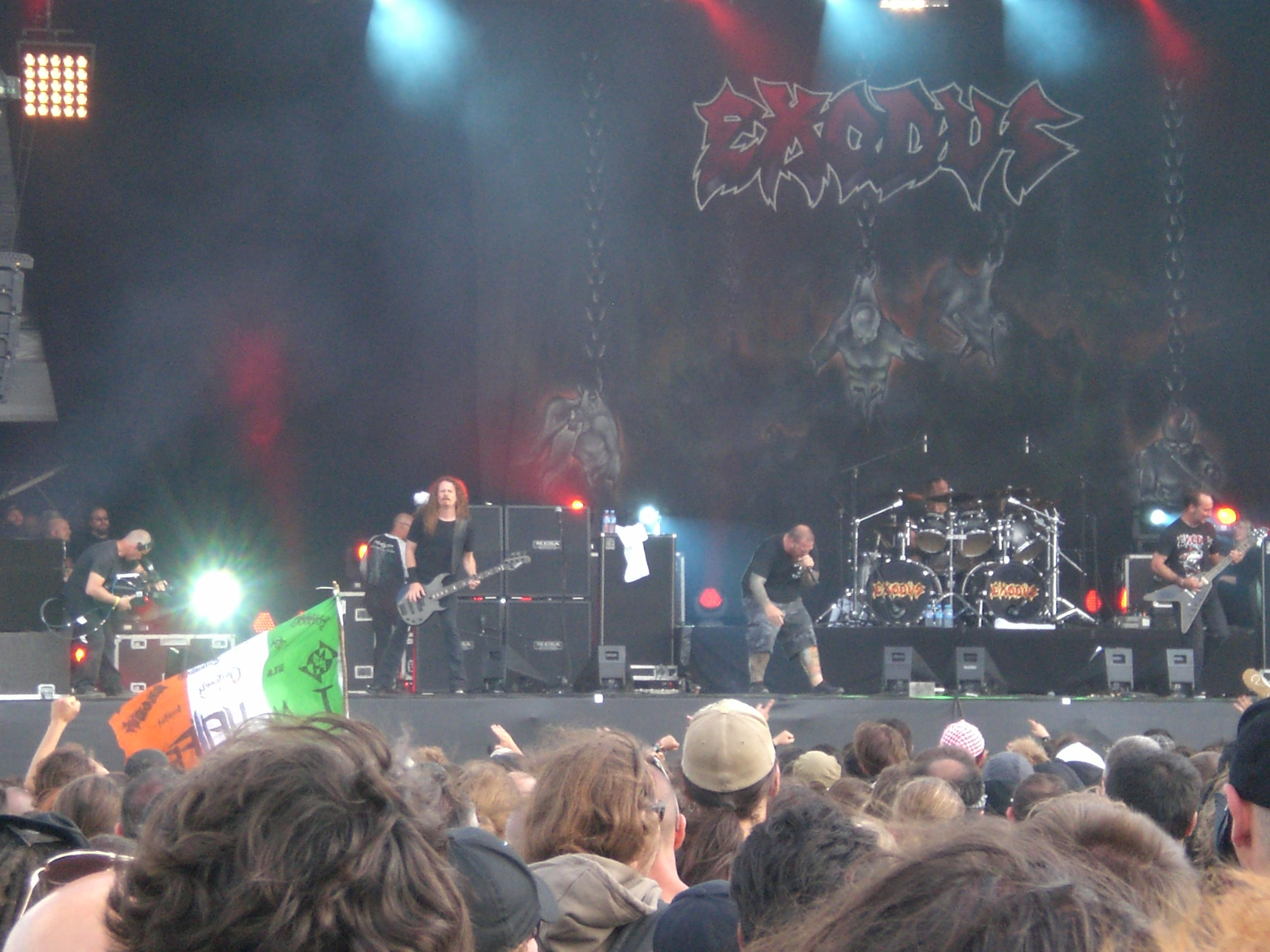
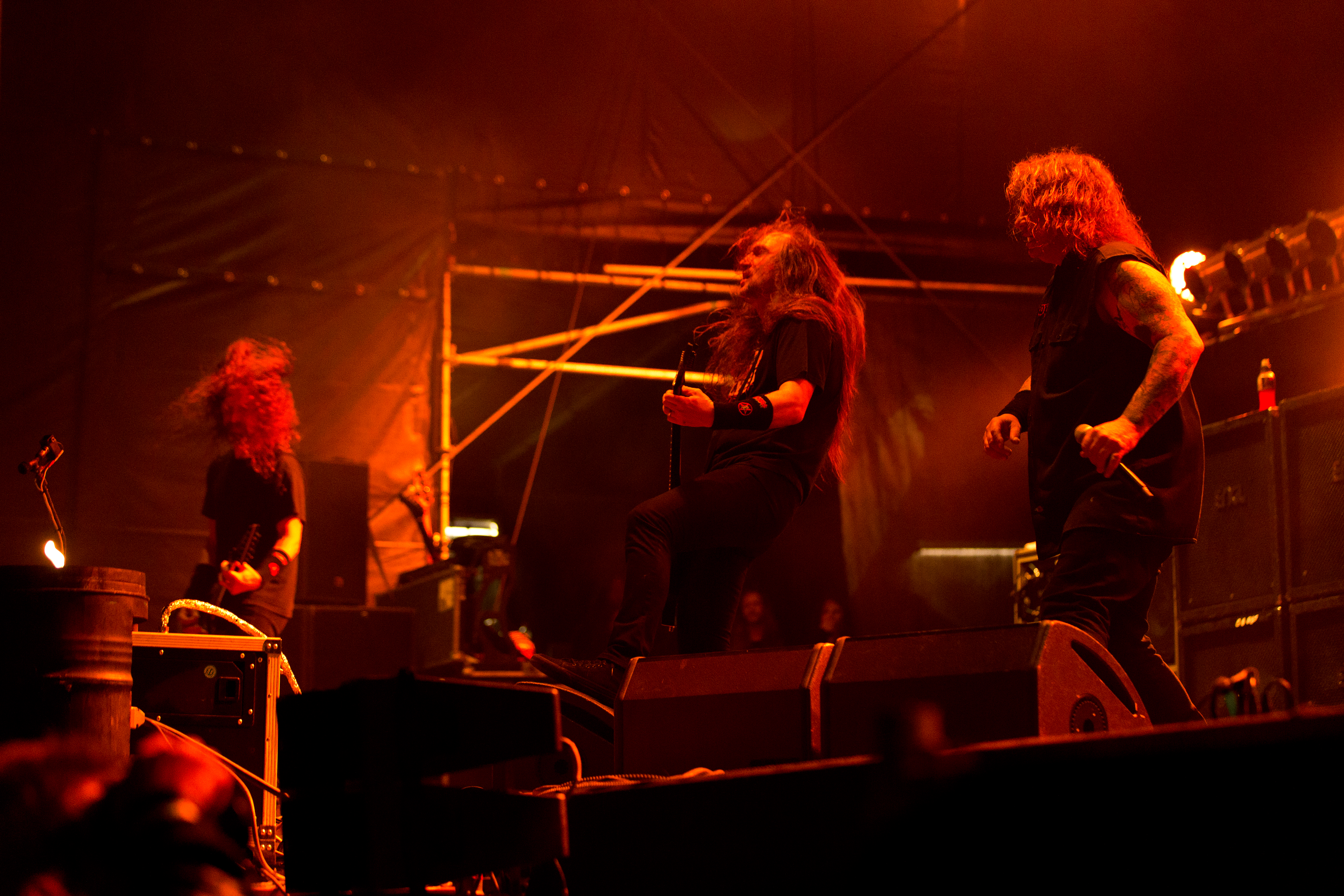
Two lineups of Exodus performing in 2012 (top) and 2016 (bottom)

Exodus is an American thrash metal band from Richmond, California. Formed in 1979, the group originally included drummer Tom Hunting, guitarists Kirk Hammett and Tim Agnello, and lead vocalist Keith Stewart, who later added guitarist Mikey B, who left after six months. The band currently consists of Hunting (a near consistent with absences between 1989 to 1997 and 2005 to 2007) alongside guitarist Gary Holt (since 1981), bassist Jack Gibson (since 1997), guitarist Lee Altus (since 2005), and lead vocalist Rob Dukes (who first joined in 2005, and rejoined in 2025).

== History ==
In 1980, Stewart left later, with Hunting handling lead vocal duties for a short period. Agnello also left shortly after, leaving the band to continue as a trio. Melson was replaced by Jeff Andrews around the same time. Gary Holt joined as Agnello's replacement in 1981. In 1982, the band added vocalist Paul Baloff, who performed on its first three-track demo the same year. The following April, Hammett left Exodus to join Metallica, with Rick Hunolt quickly brought in to replace him. Andrews later left to form death metal band Possessed, and was replaced by Rob McKillop.

With a settled lineup of Hunting, Holt, Baloff, Hunolt and McKillop, Exodus released its debut studio album Bonded by Blood in 1985. Following the touring cycle for the album, Baloff was fired from Exodus due to "personal and musical differences," having contributed to the writing of two tracks for the band's second album. He was replaced by former Legacy singer Steve "Zetro" Souza. After the release of Pleasures of the Flesh and Fabulous Disaster, Hunting left Exodus in 1989 and was replaced by John Tempesta. Impact Is Imminent was released in 1990, and the following year McKillop was replaced by Mike Butler, who performed on the 1992 release Force of Habit. Due to increased tensions between the singer and other members, the band fired Souza after touring throughout 1993, shortly before disbanding.

Holt and Hunolt reunited Exodus in 1997. Hunting and Baloff rejoined also, and Jack Gibson was added as their new bassist, completing a short tour which spawned the live album Another Lesson in Violence. The band returned again in September 2001, before Baloff died on February 4, 2002, after suffering a stroke. Just two days later, it was announced that Exodus would continue its scheduled tour with returning vocalist Souza. The band released its first studio album in twelve years in February 2004, Tempo of the Damned, before Souza left again in September. After Exhumed frontman Matt Harvey initially filled in on vocals, Skinlab singer Steev Esquivel took over for tour dates in October and November, before Rob Dukes was brought in as Souza's official replacement in January 2005.

Further lineup changes took place in 2005 – first Hunting was replaced by Paul Bostaph in May, then Hunolt left in June, with Heathen guitarist Lee Altus taking his place in August. Shovel Headed Kill Machine was released in October, which was Bostaph's only recording with the band as Hunting returned in March 2007. In 2012, Hunolt returned as a touring guitarist in place of Holt, who had begun touring with Slayer in place of Jeff Hanneman. Holt later joined Slayer as an official member, with Heathen's Kragen Lum joining Exodus for tour dates in 2013. In June 2014, Dukes was dismissed from Exodus and replaced by the returning Souza.

On January 15, 2025, the band announced the departure of Souza, and subsequent return of Dukes.

== Members ==
=== Current ===
Image	Name	Years Active	Instruments	Release contributions
	Tom Hunting	1979–1989; 1997–1998; 2001–2005; 2007–present	drums; lead vocals (1980–1982)	Bonded by Blood (1985); Pleasures of the Flesh (1987); Fabulous Disaster (1989); Good Friendly Violent Fun (1991); Another Lesson in Violence (1997); Tempo of the Damned (2004); Live at the DNA 2004 (2005); all Exodus releases from The Atrocity Exhibition... Exhibit A (2007) onwards
	Gary Holt	1981–1993; 1997–1998; 2001–present	guitar; backing vocals	all Exodus releases
	Jack Gibson	1997–1998; 2001–present	bass; backing vocals	all Exodus releases from Another Lesson in Violence (1997) onwards
	Lee Altus	2005–present	guitar	all Exodus releases from Shovel Headed Kill Machine (2005) onwards, except Double Live Dynamo! (2008)
	Rob Dukes	2005–2014; 2025–present	lead vocals	all Exodus releases from Shovel Headed Kill Machine (2005) to Exhibit B: The Human Condition (2010), except Double Live Dynamo! (2008)

=== Former ===
Image	Name	Years Active	Instruments	Release contributions
	Kirk Hammett	1979–1983; 2014 (as guest)	guitar	1982 Demo (1982); Tempo of the Damned (2004) – songwriting credit on one track; Blood In, Blood Out (2014) – guest guitar solo on one track
	Tim Agnello	1979–1981	guitar	none
	Keith Stewart	1979–1980	lead vocals	none
	Carlton Melson	1979–1981	bass	none
	Jeff Andrews	1981–1983; 2025 (as guest)	bass	1982 Demo (1982)
	Paul Baloff	1982–1986; 1997–1998; 2001–2002 (until his death)	lead vocals	1982 Demo (1982); Bonded by Blood (1985); Another Lesson in Violence (1997); Double Live Dynamo! (2008)
	Mike Maung	1983	guitar	none
	Evan McCaskey	1983 (died 1989)	guitar	none
	Rob McKillop	1983–1991	bass	all Exodus releases from Rehearsal '83 (1983) to Good Friendly Violent Fun (1991); Double Live Dynamo! (2007)
	Rick Hunolt	1983–1993; 1997–1998; 2001–2005; 2012–2013 (substitute); 2025 (as guest)	guitar	all Exodus releases from Bonded by Blood (1985) to Live at the DNA 2004 (2005); Double Live Dynamo! (2008)
	Steve "Zetro" Souza	1986–1993; 2002–2004; 2014–2025	lead vocals	all Exodus releases from Pleasures of the Flesh (1987) to Force of Habit (1992); Tempo of the Damned (2004); Live at the DNA 2004 (2005); all Exodus releases from Blood In, Blood Out (2014) to British Disaster: The Battle of '89 (Live at the Astoria) (2024)
	John Tempesta	1989–1993; 2021 (substitute)	drums	Impact Is Imminent (1990); Force of Habit (1992)
	Mike Butler	1991–1993	bass	Force of Habit (1992)
	Paul Bostaph	2005–2007	drums	Shovel Headed Kill Machine (2005)

=== Touring ===
Image	Name	Years active	Instruments	Notes
	Perry Strickland	1989 (substitute)	drums	Strickland performed with Exodus following Hunting's departure in 1989, and prior to Tempesta's joining.
	Gannon Hall	1993 (substitute)	drums	Hall and Kontos both filled in following the departure of Tempesta at the end of the band's 1993 tour.
	Chris Kontos	1993 (substitute)	drums	Hall and Kontos both filled in following the departure of Tempesta at the end of the band's 1993 tour.
	Matt Harvey	2004 (substitute)	lead vocals	Harvey substituted for Souza in September 2004, prior to his official departure from the band.
	Steev Esquivel	2004 (substitute)	lead vocals	Esquivel performed with Exodus for tour dates in late 2004, following Souza's departure in September.
	Kragen Lum	2013 (substitute); 2015–2019 (substitute)	guitar; backing vocals	Lum has performed with Exodus for tour dates in 2013 and from 2015 to 2019, as Holt continued touring with Slayer.
	Brandon Ellis	2022 (substitute)	guitar	Ellis, from The Black Dahlia Murder, filled in for Lee Altus for Exodus' 2022 summer European tour.
	Mike Schleibaum	2023 (substitute)	bass	Schleibaum, from Darkest Hour, filled in for Jack Gibson on December 10, 2023, at Preserving Underground. He continued to play bass when Gibson had to sit out the tour.

== Lineups ==
Period	Members	Releases
Late 1979–Early 1980	Tom Hunting – drums; Kirk Hammett – guitar, backing vocals; Tim Agnello – guitar, backing vocals; Keith Stewart – lead vocals; Carlton Melson – bass	none
Early 1980–Early 1981	Tom Hunting – drums, lead vocals; Kirk Hammett – guitar, backing vocals; Tim Agnello – guitar, backing vocals; Carlton Melson – bass	none
1981	Tom Hunting – drums, lead vocals; Kirk Hammett – guitar, backing vocals; Carlton Melson – bass	none
Mid 1981	Tom Hunting – drums, lead vocals; Kirk Hammett – guitar, backing vocals; Jeff Andrews – bass	none
Late 1981–November 1982	Tom Hunting – drums, lead vocals; Kirk Hammett – guitar, backing vocals; Jeff Andrews – bass; Gary Holt – guitar, backing vocals	none
November 1982–April 1983	Tom Hunting – drums; Kirk Hammett – guitar, backing vocals; Jeff Andrews – bass; Gary Holt – guitar, backing vocals; Paul Baloff – lead vocals	Untitled 1982 demo (1982); Die by His Hand (1983)
April–May 1983	Tom Hunting – drums; Jeff Andrews – bass, backing vocals; Gary Holt – guitar, backing vocals; Paul Baloff – lead vocals; Mike Maung – guitar	none
May–June 1983	Tom Hunting – drums; Jeff Andrews – bass, backing vocals; Gary Holt – guitar, backing vocals; Paul Baloff – lead vocals; Evan McCaskey – guitar	none
June 1983–June 1986	Tom Hunting – drums; Gary Holt – guitar, backing vocals; Paul Baloff – lead vocals; Rick Hunolt – guitar, backing vocals; Rob McKillop – bass	Rehearsal '83 (1983); Bonded by Blood (1985); Double Live Dynamo! (2008)
June 1986–July 1989	Tom Hunting – drums; Gary Holt – guitar, backing vocals; Rick Hunolt – guitar, backing vocals; Rob McKillop – bass; Steve Souza – lead vocals	Pleasures of the Flesh (1987); Fabulous Disaster (1989)
July–November 1989	Gary Holt – guitar, backing vocals; Rick Hunolt – guitar, backing vocals; Rob McKillop – bass; Steve Souza – lead vocals; Perry Strickland – drums (touring)	none
December 1989–1991	Gary Holt – guitar, backing vocals; Rick Hunolt – guitar, backing vocals; Rob McKillop – bass; Steve Souza – lead vocals; John Tempesta – drums	Impact Is Imminent (1990); Good Friendly Violent Fun (1991)
1991–1993	Gary Holt – guitar, backing vocals; Rick Hunolt – guitar, backing vocals; Steve Souza – lead vocals; John Tempesta – drums; Mike Butler – bass	Force of Habit (1992)
1993	Gary Holt – guitar, backing vocals; Rick Hunolt – guitar, backing vocals; Steve Souza – lead vocals; Mike Butler – bass; Gannon Hall – drums (touring)	none
1993	Gary Holt – guitar, backing vocals; Rick Hunolt – guitar, backing vocals; Steve Souza – lead vocals; Mike Butler – bass; Chris Kontos – drums (touring)	none
Band inactive 1993–1997
1997–April 1998	Gary Holt – guitar, backing vocals; Rick Hunolt – guitar, backing vocals; Tom Hunting – drums; Paul Baloff – lead vocals; Jack Gibson – bass	Another Lesson in Violence (1997); Double Live Dynamo! (2008)
Band inactive April 1998–September 2001
September 2001–February 2002	Gary Holt – guitar, backing vocals; Rick Hunolt – guitar, backing vocals; Tom Hunting – drums; Paul Baloff – lead vocals; Jack Gibson – bass	none
February 2002–September 2004	Gary Holt – guitar, backing vocals; Rick Hunolt – guitar, backing vocals; Tom Hunting – drums; Jack Gibson – bass; Steve Souza – lead vocals	Tempo of the Damned (2004); Live at the DNA 2004 (2005)
September–October 2004	Gary Holt – guitar, backing vocals; Rick Hunolt – guitar, backing vocals; Tom Hunting – drums; Jack Gibson – bass; Matt Harvey – lead vocals (touring)	none
October–November 2004	Gary Holt – guitar, backing vocals; Rick Hunolt – guitar, backing vocals; Tom Hunting – drums; Jack Gibson – bass; Steev Esquivel – lead vocals (touring)	none
November–December 2004	Gary Holt – guitar, backing vocals; Rick Hunolt – guitar, backing vocals; Tom Hunting – drums, lead vocals; Jack Gibson – bass	none
January–May 2005	Gary Holt – guitar, backing vocals; Rick Hunolt – guitar, backing vocals; Tom Hunting – drums; Jack Gibson – bass; Rob Dukes – lead vocals	none
May–June 2005	Gary Holt – guitar, backing vocals; Rick Hunolt – guitar, backing voclas; Jack Gibson – bass; Rob Dukes – lead vocals; Paul Bostaph – drums	none
June–August 2005	Gary Holt – guitar, backing vocals; Jack Gibson – bass, backing vocals; Rob Dukes – lead vocals; Paul Bostaph – drums	none
August 2005–March 2007	Gary Holt – guitar, backing vocals; Jack Gibson – bass, backing vocals; Rob Dukes – lead vocals; Paul Bostaph – drums; Lee Altus – guitar	Shovel Headed Kill Machine (2005)
March 2007–June 2014	Gary Holt – guitar, backing vocals; Jack Gibson – bass, backing vocals; Rob Dukes – lead vocals; Lee Altus – guitar; Tom Hunting – drums	The Atrocity Exhibition... Exhibit A (2007); Let There Be Blood (2008); Exhibit B: The Human Condition (2010); Shovel Headed Tour Machine (2010)
June 2014–January 2025	Gary Holt – guitar, backing vocals; Jack Gibson – bass, backing vocals; Lee Altus – guitar; Tom Hunting – drums; Steve Souza – lead vocals	Blood In, Blood Out (2014); Persona Non Grata (2021)
January 2025–present	Gary Holt – guitar, backing vocals; Jack Gibson – bass, backing vocals; Lee Altus – guitar; Tom Hunting – drums; Rob Dukes – lead vocals	Goliath (2026)
