= Exodus discography =

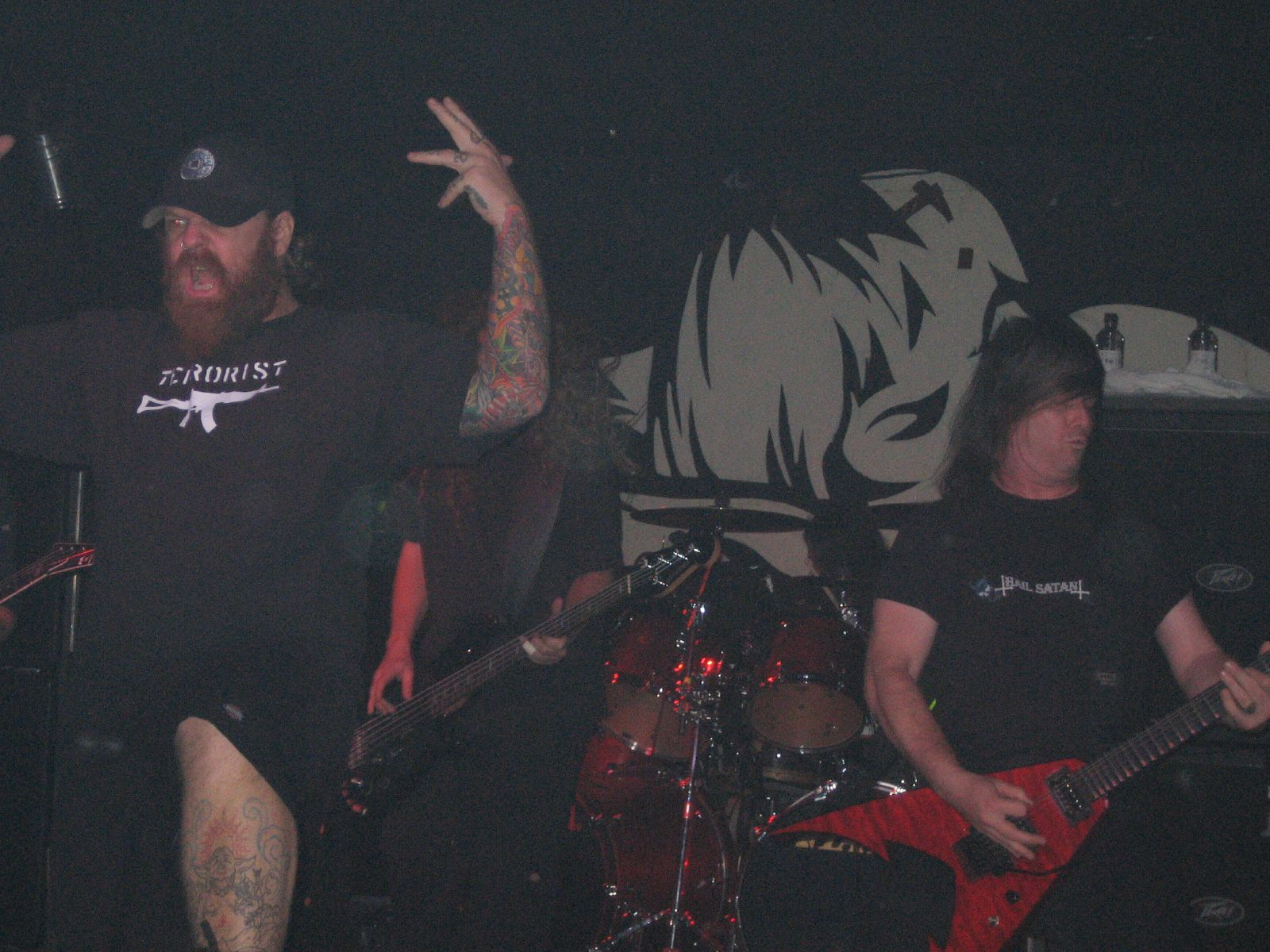
- Studio albums: 13
- Live albums: 3
- Compilation albums: 2
- Singles: 11
- Video albums: 3
- Music videos: 11

This article presents the discography of Exodus, an American thrash metal band formed in 1979 in San Francisco, California. The band rose to prominence in the US during the thrash metal era with their first four albums between 1985 and 1990. Over the years, they have released thirteen studio albums, three live albums, two compilation albums, three video albums, eleven music videos and eight singles.

== Albums ==
=== Studio albums ===
Year	Album details	Peak chart positions									
Year	Album details	US	US Ind.	AUT	FIN	GER	GRC	JPN	NLD	SWI	UK
1985	Bonded by Blood: Released: April 5, 1985; Label: Combat; Formats: CD, CS, LP, DL	—	—	—	—	—	—	—	—	—	—
1987	Pleasures of the Flesh: Released: October 7, 1987; Label: Combat; Formats: CD, CS, LP, DL	82	—	—	—	—	—	—	72	—	—
1989	Fabulous Disaster: Released: January 30, 1989; Label: Combat; Formats: CD, CS, LP, DL	82	—	—	—	—	—	—	57	—	67
1990	Impact Is Imminent: Released: July 10, 1990; Label: Capitol; Formats: CD, CS, LP, DL	137	—	—	—	—	—	—	—	—	—
1992	Force of Habit: Released: August 25, 1992; Label: Capitol; Formats: CD, CS, LP, DL	—	—	—	—	—	—	—	—	—	—
2004	Tempo of the Damned: Released: March 9, 2004; Label: Nuclear Blast; Formats: CD, LP, DL	—	47	—	—	67	—	—	—	—	—
2005	Shovel Headed Kill Machine: Released: October 4, 2005; Label: Nuclear Blast; Formats: CD, LP, DL	—	41	—	—	—	—	146	—	—	—
2007	The Atrocity Exhibition... Exhibit A: Released: October 23, 2007; Label: Nuclear Blast; Formats: CD, LP, DL	—	—	—	—	74	—	159	—	—	—
2010	Exhibit B: The Human Condition: Released: May 18, 2010; Label: Nuclear Blast; Formats: CD, LP, DL	114	19	49	50	32	14	110	—	53	—
2014	Blood In, Blood Out: Released: October 14, 2014; Label: Nuclear Blast; Formats: CD, LP, DL	38	—	38	30	29	—	40	85	—	71
2021	Persona Non Grata: Released: November 19, 2021; Label: Nuclear Blast; Formats: CD, CS, LP, DL	—	—	33	—	24	—	44	—	22	50
2026	Goliath: Released: March 20, 2026; Label: Napalm; Formats: CD, LP, DL	—	—	4	—	9	—	—	—	—	—
"—" denotes a release that did not chart.

=== Re-recorded albums ===
Year	Album details
2008	Let There Be Blood: Released: October 28, 2008; Label: Zaentz; Formats: CD, LP, DL

=== Live albums ===
Year	Album details
1991	Good Friendly Violent Fun: Released: November 5, 1991; Label: Combat; Formats: CD, CS, LP, DI
1997	Another Lesson in Violence: Released: July 8, 1997; Label: Century Media; Formats: CD, DL
2005	Live at the DNA 2004: Released: January 1, 2005; Label: Nuclear Blast; Formats: CD, DL

=== Compilation albums ===
Year	Album details	Peak chart positions
Year	Album details	US Ind.
1992	Lessons in Violence: Released: June 9, 1992; Label: Relativity; Formats: CD, CS, LP, DL	—
"—" denotes a release that did not chart.

== Singles ==
Year	Song	Album
1990	"Objection Overruled"	Impact Is Imminent
1990	"The Lunatic Parade"	Impact Is Imminent
1992	"Thorn in My Side"	Force of Habit
2004	"War Is My Shepherd"	Tempo of the Damned
2007	"Funeral Hymn"	The Atrocity Exhibition... Exhibit A
2008	"Riot Act"	The Atrocity Exhibition... Exhibit A
2010	"Downfall"	Exhibit B: The Human Condition
2011	"Hammer and Life"	Exhibit B: The Human Condition
2021	"The Beatings Will Continue (Until Morale Improves)"	Persona Non Grata
2021	"Clickbait"	Persona Non Grata
2021	"The Years of Death and Dying"	Persona Non Grata
2024	"Beating Around the Bush (AC/DC Cover)"	Non-album single
2026	"3111"	Goliath

== Videos ==
=== Video albums ===
2010	Shovel Headed Tour Machine: Live at Wacken & Other Assorted Atrocities: Released: January 15, 2010; Label: Nuclear Blast; Formats: DVD

=== Music videos ===
Year	Song	Director
1989	"The Toxic Waltz"	Daniel P. Rodriguez
1990	"Objection Overruled"	Rob McKillop
1992	"Thorn in My Side"	Chris Ashbrook, Dave Stewart
1992	"A Good Day to Die"	Robert Caruso
1998	"No Love"	
2004	"War Is My Shepherd"	Maurice Swinkels
2004	"Throwing Down"	Maurice Swinkels
2005	"Now Thy Death Day Come"	Gary Smithson
2007	"Riot Act"	Jon Schnepp
2010	"Downfall"	Jon Schnepp
2014	"Blood In, Blood Out"	Shadow Born Group
2021	"The Beatings Will Continue (Until Morale Improves)"	BJ McDonnell
2022	"The Fires Of Division"	Jim Louvau, Tony Aguilera
2026	"3111"	Jim Louvau
