= Lessons in Violence =

Compilation album by Exodus
- Released: June 9, 1992
- Recorded: 1985–1989
- Genre: Thrash metal
- Length: 43:08
- Labels: Relativity; Music for Nations (UK)

Exodus chronology
Good Friendly Violent Fun (1991)	Lessons in Violence (1992)	Force of Habit (1992)

Professional ratings
Review scores
Source	Rating
AllMusic	4/5 stars

The Best of Exodus: Lessons in Violence is a compilation album by thrash metal band Exodus. Even though this compilation album was released after Impact Is Imminent, it contains no tracks from that album as Exodus had switched record labels by that time. Therefore, the band had no involvement with this album.

In addition to tracks from the first three Exodus studio albums, this collection includes the AC/DC cover "Dirty Deeds Done Dirt Cheap", which was recorded live on July 14, 1989, at the Fillmore in San Francisco, California, and can be found on their 1991 live album Good Friendly Violent Fun. "And Then There Were None" was recorded live at the Astoria in London, England on March 8, 1989; this version can be found on the CD reissue of Bonded by Blood from 1989.

== Track listing ==
1. "Bonded by Blood" - 3:48
2. "Exodus" - 4:09
3. "Chemi-Kill" - 5:46
4. "The Toxic Waltz" - 4:51
5. "A Lesson in Violence" - 3:49
6. "Piranha" - 3:50
7. "Brain Dead" - 4:18
8. "Fabulous Disaster" - 4:54
9. "Dirty Deeds Done Dirt Cheap" (live) - 4:43 (AC/DC cover)
10. "And Then There Were None" (live) - 4:44

== Band line-up ==
- Paul Baloff - vocals - tracks 1, 2, 5, 6
- Steve "Zetro" Souza - vocals - tracks 3, 4, 7, 8, 9, 10
- Gary Holt - guitars
- Rick Hunolt - guitars
- Rob McKillop - bass
- Tom Hunting - drums - tracks 1–8, 10
- John Tempesta - drums - track 9
