= Elitist (disambiguation) =

An elitist is someone who believes in elitism. Elitist may also refer to:

- Elitist Records, a sublabel of Earache Records
- Elitist selection, retaining the best individuals in a generation unchanged in the next generation
- "Elitist", a song by Exodus from their 2021 album Persona Non Grata
