= Tom Hunting =

American drummer

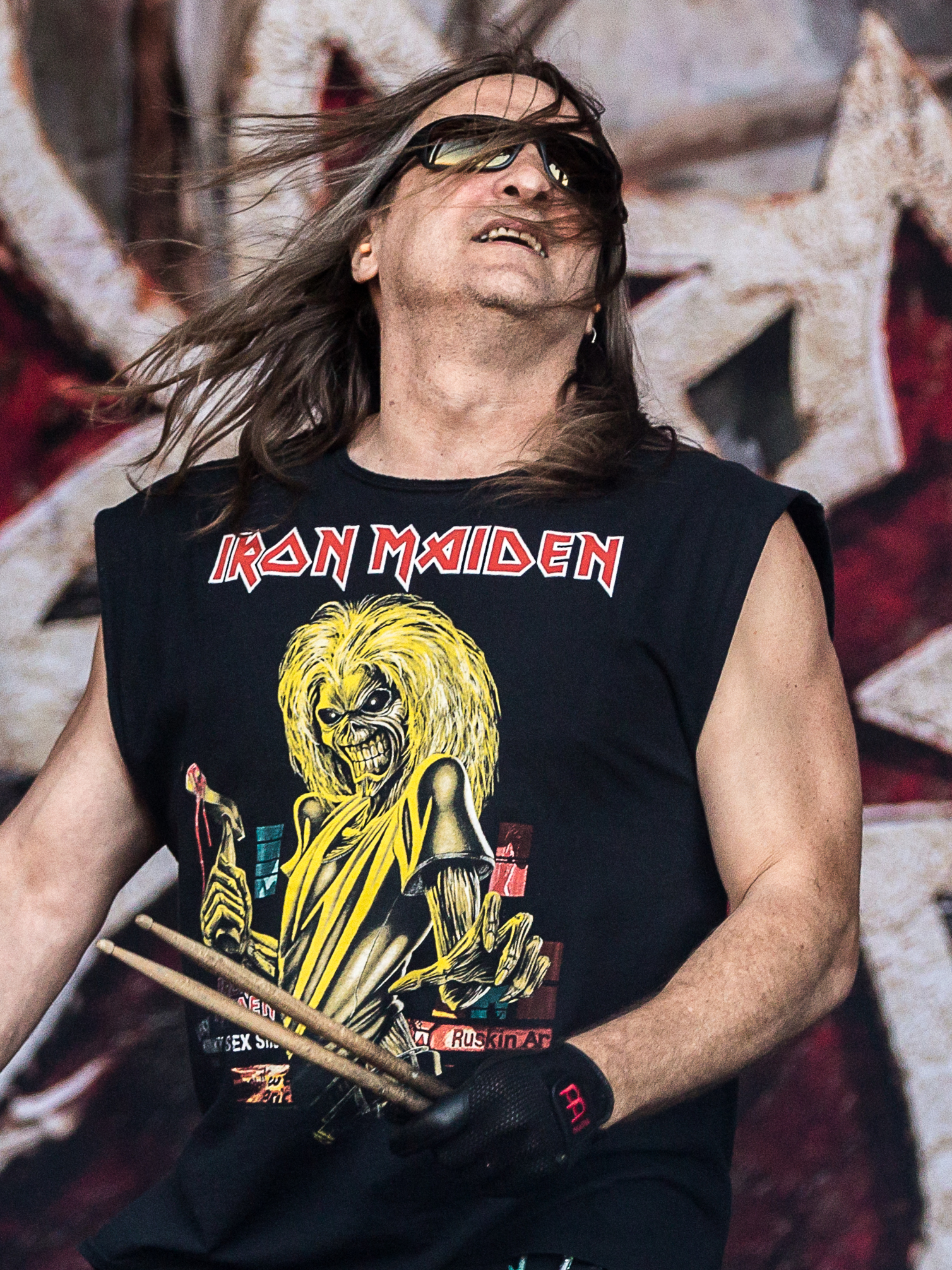
- Hunting performing with Exodus in 2018

Background information
- Born: April 10, 1965 (age 61)
- Genres: Thrash metal
- Occupation: Drummer
- Years active: 1979–present
- Member of: Exodus
- Formerly of: Angel Witch

Thomas Hunting (born April 10, 1965) is an American musician. He is the drummer and only remaining original member of the thrash metal band Exodus.

== Career ==
Growing up Hunting was a fan of funk music, he eventually got into hard rock acts such as AC/DC. He originally started out his musical career playing guitar, however he later purchased his own drum set in high school and started playing with kids at his school where he met Kirk Hammett.

=== Exodus ===
Hunting is the only original member of Exodus left, although he departed from the band on two occasions. During the bands early years he also served as their singer / co singer until Paul Baloff joined the band in 1982.

He first left the band in 1989 in the middle of the Headbangers Ball Tour (with Anthrax and Helloween) due to an illness, and was replaced temporarily by Perry Strickland of Vio-lence and permanently by John Tempesta, who stayed in Exodus until their first breakup in 1993. Hunting returned in 1997 with Paul Baloff, Gary Holt, Rick Hunolt, and current bassist Jack Gibson for the Another Lesson in Violence tour. Hunting (along with Steve "Zetro" Souza, and Rick Hunolt) once again left Exodus in 2005, and was replaced with drummer Paul Bostaph, who had left Slayer when Dave Lombardo rejoined the band. This was due to Hunting suffering from panic attacks and needing to take a break from the band. Later, in 2007, Hunting rejoined the band when Bostaph left to rejoin Testament. He has said that he is great friends with Bostaph.

Hunting has played on played on ten out of thirteen of Exodus' studio albums: Bonded by Blood (1985), Pleasures of the Flesh (1987), Fabulous Disaster (1989), Tempo of the Damned (2004), The Atrocity Exhibition... Exhibit A (2007), Let There Be Blood (2008), Exhibit B: The Human Condition (2010), Blood In, Blood Out (2014), Persona Non Grata (2021) and Goliath (2026).

=== Angel Witch ===
In 1990, Hunting joined the new incarnation of the British heavy metal band Angel Witch. He played on the bands three-track demo Twist of the Knife, which remained unreleased until the Resurrection compilation in 2000. Adding rhythm guitarist Doug Piercy, the band planned a tour of the United States later in the year. However, due to legal issues regarding his immigration to the US, Heybourne was deported back to the UK. The band subsequently dissolved, as vocalist and guitarist Kevin Heybourne returned to his full-time job as a tree surgeon.

In January 2003 Heybounre announced Hunting would be rejoining the band once again. However within two months, Hunting had bowed out and been replaced by Altus's Heathen bandmate Darren Minter.

== Gear and influences ==
Hunting has cited Creedence Clearwater Revival, John Bonham of Led Zeppelin, Keith Moon of The Who, Neil Peart of Rush, Clive Burr of Iron Maiden, and also Michael Derosier and Denny Carmassi, both of Heart, as his main influences.

Hunting currently uses Yamaha drums, Meinl cymbals, Vic Firth drumsticks, Evans drumheads, and sE mics. He is also known for decking out his kick drum pedals with skateboard tape which he says helps prevent the pedals from getting too slippery with sweat and condensation during shows.

== Health ==
In February 2021, Hunting was diagnosed with squamous cell carcinoma (SCC) of the stomach. On April 13, three days after his 56th birthday, he revealed his diagnosis. A week later, Exodus launched a GoFundMe campaign, which passed the $80,000 mark in less than a week, with Metallica guitarist and former bandmate Kirk Hammett donating $5,000, and Fozzy vocalist and professional wrestler Chris Jericho donating among others. On May 20, Steve "Zetro" Souza said that Hunting was faring well in his cancer treatment.

Hunting underwent a successful total gastrectomy on July 12, less than five months after starting the treatment process. He said that he had four rounds of chemotherapy and that the cancer shrunk to less than half the size it was in March, and would have four more treatments before resuming his activities. On July 26, Gary Holt declared Hunting cancer free; however, Hunting clarified that despite being told that everything was removed from his stomach, he said that it was "presumptuous" to say cancer free before being scheduled for four more outro chemo treatments and a scan to show that he no longer lives with cancer. Holt acknowledged his previous statement by saying that he may have in his excitement "jumped the gun", but expressed optimism towards Hunting's progress in his recovery.
