= Paul Baloff =

American heavy metal vocalist (1960–2002)

- Born: April 25, 1960; Oakland, California, U.S.
- Died: February 2, 2002 (aged 41) Oakland, California, U.S.
- Genres: Thrash metal; speed metal
- Occupation: Singer
- Years active: 1981–2002
- Formerly of: Exodus; Hirax; Heathen; Piranha; Spastik Children

Paul Nicholas Baloff (April 25, 1960 – February 2, 2002) was an American singer, best known as the original lead vocalist of the thrash metal band Exodus. He was fired from Exodus shortly after the release of the band's 1985 debut album Bonded by Blood, which is considered one of the most influential thrash metal albums of all time. He sang with various other bands before rejoining Exodus in 1997. Baloff died of a stroke in 2002.

== Early life ==
Baloff was born in Highland Hospital in Oakland, California. His mother was Dutch, and he was of partial Russian descent and had one sister. In life, he would spread rumors that he was a Russian immigrant under the birth name Pavel Nikolayevitch Balchishkov, and that his parents were "rocket scientists" who fled the country, creating what Sonic Perspectives called his "unofficial folklore."

== Career ==
=== Formation of Exodus (1981–1983) ===
Exodus guitarist Kirk Hammett and Baloff met at a North Berkeley house party in 1981 and became fast friends due to their shared admiration for punk rock and the new wave of British heavy metal. Baloff joined Exodus in 1982 as lead vocalist to complete the lineup, which included Hammett, guitarist Gary Holt, drummer Tom Hunting and bassist Geoff Andrews.

=== Bonded by Blood and firing (1984–1986) ===
Exodus recorded their first album Bonded by Blood in the summer of 1984. Audio engineering college student Mark Whitaker, who had attended high school with Baloff, oversaw management and record production for the band at the time. 1984 concert photos from Exodus shows at Aquatic Park's Eastern Front Metal Festival (with Slayer and Suicidal Tendencies) and Ruthie's Inn (with Megadeth and Slayer) were included on the album sleeve inserts. Originally titled "A Lesson in Violence", the album was not released until April 1985 amidst creative and business setbacks.

Shortly after touring for Bonded by Blood, Baloff was fired from the band for "personal and musical differences", although he still had writer credits on their next album, Pleasures of the Flesh. He was replaced by Steve "Zetro" Souza, who had previously been the lead vocalist for Legacy, an early incarnation of Testament. Baloff went on to form the band Piranha. He sang in several bands in the San Francisco Bay area including Piranha, Hirax, and Heathen. During his time away from Exodus he lived in Monterey, California where Holt later stated he lived the "vagabond beach life."

=== Return to Exodus (1997–2000) ===
After a few dormant years of Exodus' extended hiatus, Baloff briefly reunited with Holt and Hunolt to reform Exodus in 1997. They released a live album titled Another Lesson in Violence. The group disbanded again shortly after, in part due to a falling out with record label Century Media over the way the live album was promoted, and over an aborted attempt at a live concert video that was filmed but never released due to a financial dispute.

=== Exodus' second reformation and death (2001–2002) ===
In 2001, Exodus reformed once again. There was talk of recording a new studio album and the band continued to play local shows in and around the San Francisco Bay Area.

In February 2002, Baloff had a stroke that left him in a coma, and he died after being removed from life support. He was 41 years old.

Former vocalist Steve Souza was recruited back into the band to finish the rest of their concert commitments. Although it appeared to outsiders that with Baloff's death, Exodus would cease to exist, guitarist Gary Holt was determined to release a new studio record. The result was 2004's Tempo of the Damned, which is dedicated to Baloff's memory.

== Legacy ==
In October 2008, Exodus released a re-recording of their 1985 debut album Bonded by Blood entitled Let There Be Blood. Gary Holt released the following statement about the band's decision to revisit their debut album: "After many years in the planning and discussion stage, we have finally completed the re-recording of 'Bonded By Blood'. We have decided to call it 'Let There Be Blood' and it is our way of paying homage to [late singer] Paul Baloff by showing how relevant these songs we had written together still are. We aren't trying to replace the original; that's impossible anyway. We are just giving these songs the benefit of modern production. It's something we talked about before Paul's death and it's always been important to us to do. We were super excited about entering the studio once again to record these classics, and now it's back to writing the next studio record!"

On February 4, 2012, a Paul Baloff Memorial Reunion Concert was held at the Oakland Metro Opera House. Former and current members included Kirk Hammett, Rick Hunolt, Gary Holt, Geoff Andrews, Lee Altus, Rob Dukes, Tom Hunting and Jack Gibson. It was the first time they have all played together since 1983.

== Discography ==
=== With Exodus ===
- 1982 Demo (1982)
- Bonded by Blood (1985)
- Pleasures of the Flesh (1987) (credited for the songwriting, but only performed on the demo)
- Lessons in Violence (1992)
- Another Lesson in Violence (1997)
- Tempo of the Damned (2004) (posthumously credited for the songwriting on Impaler, but did not perform)
- Let There Be Blood (2008) (posthumously credited for the songwriting, but did not perform)

=== With Heathen ===
- Untitled 1988 demo (1988)

=== With Piranha ===
- Big Fucking Teeth (1988, demo)
- Piranha (1988, demo)
