= Another Lesson in Violence =

Live album by Exodus
- Released: July 8, 1997
- Recorded: March 8, 1997
- Venue: The Trocadero, San Francisco
- Genre: Thrash metal
- Length: 74:52
- Labels: Century Media; Victor (Japan)
- Producers: Exodus, Andy Sneap

Exodus chronology
Force of Habit (1992)	Another Lesson in Violence (1997)	Tempo of the Damned (2004)

Professional ratings
Review scores
Source	Rating
AllMusic	3/5 stars
Collector's Guide to Heavy Metal	8/10

Another Lesson in Violence is a live album by the American thrash metal band Exodus.

This album comes after a large line-up change for Exodus. Paul Baloff, who originally left in 1986 after the release of Bonded by Blood, makes a return on vocals. Tom Hunting returns after leaving just before the Fabulous Disaster tour in 1989 due to illness. This is also Exodus's first album to feature Jack Gibson on bass. Robb Flynn of Vio-lence and Machine Head makes a guest appearance on "A Lesson in Violence".

In early 1998, a few months after the album was released, the band went on their second hiatus which lasted until 2001. In the following year, not long after the band had made their second reunion, long time Exodus frontman Steve "Zetro" Souza made a return to the band due to the death of Paul Baloff, brought on by a stroke.

This was the band's first collaboration with Andy Sneap, who produced the live album; he would produce, engineer, mix or master all of Exodus' albums between Tempo of the Damned (2004) and Persona Non Grata (2021).

== Track listing ==
No.	Title	Lyrics	Music	Length
1.	"Bonded by Blood"	Gary Holt, Paul Baloff	Holt	3:34
2.	"Exodus"	Baloff, Holt	Holt	4:29
3.	"Pleasures of the Flesh"	Baloff	Exodus	8:14
4.	"And Then There Were None"	Holt, Tom Hunting	Holt	5:58
5.	"Piranha"	Baloff	Holt	5:42
6.	"Seeds of Hate"	Baloff	Exodus	6:00
7.	"Deliver Us to Evil"	Holt, Mark Whitaker	Holt, Rick Hunolt	8:29
8.	"Brain Dead"	Baloff	Exodus	5:22
9.	"No Love"	Baloff	Holt	6:41
10.	"A Lesson in Violence"	Holt	Holt, Hunolt	5:58
11.	"Impaler"	Baloff	Kirk Hammett, Holt, Hunting	6:09
12.	"Strike of the Beast"	Holt, Baloff	Holt	8:13

== Personnel ==
Exodus

- Paul Baloff – lead vocals
- Gary Holt – guitars, backing vocals
- Rick Hunolt – guitars, backing vocals
- Jack Gibson – bass
- Tom Hunting – drums

Production

- Andy Sneap – production, mixing
- Steve Remote – engineering
- Bob Skye, Eric Skye, Francis Trouette, Jack Szczekocki – assistant engineering
- Gabriel Shepard – assistant mixing
- Strephon Taylor – cover artwork
