= Tempo of the Damned =

Studio album by Exodus
- Released: February 2, 2004
- Recorded: 2003
- Studios: Tsunami Recordings, Moss Beach, California, Prairie Sun Studio, Cotati, California
- Genre: Thrash metal
- Length: 58:15
- Labels: Nuclear Blast; King Records (Japan); Dream On Music (Korea)
- Producer: Andy Sneap

Exodus chronology
Another Lesson in Violence (1997)	Tempo of the Damned (2004)	Shovel Headed Kill Machine (2005)

Tempo of the Damned is the sixth studio album by American thrash metal band Exodus. Released on February 2, 2004 via Nuclear Blast, Tempo of the Damned was Exodus' first studio release since 1992's Force of Habit. It was the last appearance of longtime vocalist Steve "Zetro" Souza until his return for 2014's Blood In, Blood Out as well as the last appearance of founding drummer Tom Hunting until 2007's The Atrocity Exhibition... Exhibit A. The album was also the last studio appearance of guitarist Rick Hunolt until the band's 2021 album Persona Non Grata, where he made a guest appearance.

Tempo of the Damned is the first Exodus studio album to accredit founding guitarist Kirk Hammett for a song ("Impaler").

This album was released two years to the day after the death of former member Paul Baloff.

Although he produced the band's 1997 live album Another Lesson in Violence, this album was the first time Andy Sneap had produced, mixed, engineered or mastered an Exodus studio album; he would provide either role on the band's subsequent albums, until Persona Non Grata.

== Background ==
Tempo of the Damned marked Exodus' first full-length album of new material since 1992's Force of Habit. This is Exodus' first studio album to feature Jack Gibson on bass. This album is also the result of Steve "Zetro" Souza's return to the band, after Exodus reunited with Bonded by Blood-era lead singer Paul Baloff for the release of their live album Another Lesson in Violence in 1997. Baloff died of a stroke in 2002 and Souza was invited back into the band, although this would prove to be the last album to feature him until 2014's Blood In, Blood Out, for he abandoned the group during their tour in South America in support of the album, which resulted in a feud between him and guitarist Gary Holt. Tempo of the Damned was also the last Exodus album to feature longtime guitarist Rick Hunolt. Despite never officially rejoining the band, Hunolt filled in for Holt for European tour in the summer of 2012 due to the latter's commitments with Slayer, and made a guest appearance on their eleventh studio Persona Non Grata (2021). Although this album was also the last to feature drummer Tom Hunting before his second departure, he would later rejoin the band in 2007. Souza would rejoin Exodus as well after his replacement Rob Dukes was fired from the band in 2014.

Tempo of the Damned also marks Exodus' only studio album to contain a song credited to founding member Kirk Hammett, who found greater recognition as a member of Metallica. The others are their 1982 Demo cassette and the 1997 live release, Another Lesson in Violence; the latter featured the song "Impaler". Hammett brought one of "Impaler"'s riffs to the Metallica song "Trapped Under Ice", which was released on their 1984 album Ride the Lightning. Music videos were filmed for the songs "War Is My Shepherd" and "Throwing Down", which largely consists of a jam performance.

== Recording and promotion ==
The band once again worked with producer Andy Sneap who produced the band’s previous live album Another Lesson in Violence. In preparation of the album the band practiced nearly every day for a seven month period before officially recording the album. Drummer Tom Hunting stated that many of the songs on the album started out with a riff by Gary Holt and then got sent to him to put the whole song together.

Commenting on the album’s lyrical themes Hunting stated:

There are very strong opinions about war, very strong opinions about the state of the American government, about organized religion which people don't actually speak out or talk about. It's not that we're anti-American. Some of us might be anti-religion in certain ways... You know, it's just an expression of opinions.

Two music videos were made for the songs "War Is My Shepherd" and "Throwing Down" both directed by Maurice Swinkels. The "War Is My Shepherd" video was recorded on the on the US Hornet which was a WWII aircraft carrier.

== Reception ==
Professional ratings
Review scores
Source	Rating
AllMusic	3/5 stars
Blabbermouth.net	8/10
Lambgoat	8/10
Metal Storm	9/10
Metal.de	9/10
Ultimate Guitar	8.7/10

Tempo of the Damned received a positive review from AllMusic's Eduardo Rivadavia, who awarded the album three stars out of five, saying "all of the much loved Exodus hallmarks are here: lyrics filled with biting, sarcastic social commentary: no-fuss, jagged thrash metal; and unparalleled technical precision." He then finished his review by saying that the album "successfully resurrects Exodus as the potent and formidable thrash machine of old." Blabbermouth.net stated "Tempo of the Damned" is as good an album as one could have hoped for from EXODUS after such a lengthy absence from the recording studio. Arguably the group's finest effort since 1989's "Fabulous Disaster", this is the work of a band who still hold a respectable spot in the metal scene and who still have a lot of good days left ahead of them."

Michael Gluck of Lambgoat wrote "Tempo Of The Damned delivers on all fronts that the so-called leaders of the pack have failed miserably to do in recent years. Exodus does not disgrace their fanbase with a garage rock production job as Metallica disowned the metal world with on St. Anger, nor do they incorporate shady electronic elements and unlistenable songs like Megadeth did by tempting fate and losing with Risk. Instead, Exodus have penned an album that could not have been better written by a band twenty years their junior, a rare feat in a metal world where creativity, stamina, and speed tend to peak with youth and then fade with age."

In 2021, Metal Master Kingdom ranked it the 8th best trash metal album of the 2000s. In 2024, The Metal Hall of Fame placed it among the 75 best metal albums of the 2000s. Metal Hammer dubbed "Scar Spangeld Banner" one of the 10 best thrash metal songs of the 2000s.

Tempo of the Damned sold almost 2,600 copies in its first week of release in the U.S. and over 14,300 copies by September 13, 2004 in the U.S.

== Track listing ==
All songs written by Gary Holt except where noted.

No.	Title	Lyrics	Music	Length
1.	"Scar Spangled Banner"			6:41
2.	"War Is My Shepherd"	Steve "Zetro" Souza	Holt	4:27
3.	"Blacklist"			6:17
4.	"Shroud of Urine"			4:52
5.	"Forward March"	Souza	Holt	7:39
6.	"Culling the Herd"			6:07
7.	"Sealed with a Fist"			3:36
8.	"Throwing Down"	John Miller	Holt	5:01
9.	"Impaler"	Paul Baloff	Kirk Hammett, Holt, Tom Hunting	5:25
10.	"Tempo of the Damned"			4:22
11.	"Dirty Deeds Done Dirt Cheap" (AC/DC cover)			3:54
Total length:				58:15

Japanese edition bonus tracks
No.	Title	Length
11.	"Shroud of Urine" (demo)	4:47
12.	"Tempo of the Damned" (demo)	4:23

Korean edition bonus tracks
No.	Title	Length
11.	"Dirty Deeds Done Dirt Cheap" (AC/DC cover)	3:48
12.	"Shroud of Urine" (demo)	4:47

== Personnel ==
Exodus

- Steve "Zetro" Souza – vocals
- Gary Holt – guitars
- Rick Hunolt – guitars
- Jack Gibson – bass
- Tom Hunting – drums

Production

- Produced, engineered, mixed and mastered by Andy Sneap
- Mixed at Backstage Studio Derby UK
- Recorded at Tsunami Recordings, Moss Beach, California (except Drums Recorded at Prairie Sun Studio, Cotati, California)
- Cover Artwork by Jowita Kamińska

== Charts ==
Chart (2004)	Peak position
German Albums (Offizielle Top 100)	67
