= Slayer Farewell Tour =

2018–19 concert tour by Slayer

Slayer Final World Tour
- Tour by Slayer
- Location: Asia; Europe; North America; Oceania; South America
- Start date: May 10, 2018
- End date: November 30, 2019
- Legs: 12
- No. of shows: 147

Slayer concert chronology
- Repentless Tour (2015–2017); Final World Tour (2018–2019)

The Final World Tour (also referred to as The Farewell Tour) was the final concert tour by American thrash metal band Slayer, which began on May 10, 2018, and ended on November 30, 2019. The tour, consisting of 147 shows worldwide, served as a conclusion of the band's 38-year long career.

== Background ==
The tour was announced on January 22, 2018, through a video featuring a montage of press clippings, early posters and press photos spanning Slayer's entire career. Although the members of the band have never explained the decision to retire from touring, fans believe one of the reasons behind this was due to bassist/vocalist Tom Araya not wanting to tour anymore and a desire to spend more time with his family. The first leg of the North American tour was announced the day after, which took place in May and June 2018 and included support from Lamb of God, Anthrax, Behemoth and Testament. The second leg of the North American tour was announced on March 5, 2018; this leg took place in July and August, and featured four out of five bands from the first leg (Slayer, Lamb of God, Anthrax and Testament) and Napalm Death as the replacement for Behemoth.

On February 20, 2018, Slayer announced the first European date of the farewell tour; it was announced that they would headline the Secret Solstice Festival in Reykjavík, Iceland in June. A European leg of the farewell tour took place in November and December 2018, with support provided by Lamb of God, Anthrax and Obituary. Guitarist Gary Holt had to miss the last four dates of this tour so that he could take care of his father who was nearing the end of his life; he was filled in by former Machine Head and Vio-lence guitarist Phil Demmel.

On June 24, 2018, Slayer was announced as one of the first five bands (alongside Manowar, Carcass, Mass Hysteria and Dropkick Murphys) confirmed to play the 2019 edition of Hellfest. This was the band's first show announced for 2019, and was said to be their last show in France. Slayer also played a one-off show in Mexico at ForceFest in October 2018.

Slayer continued touring into 2019; in addition to international festival appearances, they performed in areas that the tour had not yet visited, including South America, Australia and Japan; Anthrax was the supporting act on most of the dates. Slayer toured North America in May 2019, with Lamb of God, Amon Amarth and Cannibal Corpse as the opening acts. The final North American leg of the tour took place in November 2019, and included support by Primus, Ministry and Philip H. Anselmo & The Illegals.

The band's final appearance in Chile on October 6, 2019, at the Santiago Gets Louder festival marked the first time two of the "Big Four" (Slayer and Anthrax) had shared the stage with one of the members of the "Big Teutonic Four" of thrash, Kreator. Megadeth – who had not shared the stage with Slayer and Anthrax since the series of "Big Four" shows in 2010-2011 – was initially scheduled to perform at the festival, but cancelled due to Dave Mustaine's illness and was replaced by Kreator.

On how long the farewell tour would last, Exodus vocalist and Holt's bandmate Steve "Zetro" Souza indicated that it would "take a year and a half or two years to do the one final thing, but I believe it's finished. Everybody knows what I know; just because I'm on the outside, I have no insight on that." Kristen Mulderig, who works with Rick Sales Entertainment Group, said that there would still be Slayer-related activities after the tour's conclusion. Despite being referred to as a farewell tour, the band's manager, Rick Sales, said that the tour was not a foreshadowing of their split, but an end of touring. Former Slayer drummer Dave Lombardo did not attend the band's final show.

After finishing the set from their final show at The Forum on November 30, 2019, the band and crew members hugged each other and took group photos, followed by Tom Araya bidding farewell to the fans. Guitarist Gary Holt expressed his gratitude towards the band members and then thanked the fans for making him feel welcomed since joining in 2011.

== Setlist ==
1. "Repentless"
2. "Blood Red"
3. "Disciple"
4. "Hate Worldwide"
5. "Mandatory Suicide"
6. "War Ensemble"
7. "Jihad"
8. "Postmortem"
9. "When the Stillness Comes"
10. "Payback"
11. "Seasons in the Abyss"
12. "Black Magic"
13. "Dittohead"
14. "Hell Awaits"
15. "Chemical Warfare"
16. "Dead Skin Mask"
17. "South of Heaven"
18. "Raining Blood"
19. "Angel of Death"

== Tour dates ==
Date	City	Country	Venue	Opening acts	Tickets Sold/Available
North America
May 10, 2018	San Diego	United States	Valley View Casino Center	Lamb of God; Anthrax; Behemoth; Testament	—
May 11, 2018	Irvine	United States	FivePoint Amphitheater	Lamb of God; Anthrax; Behemoth; Testament	—
May 13, 2018	Sacramento	United States	Papa Murphy's Park at Cal Expo	Lamb of God; Anthrax; Behemoth; Testament	13,711 / 13,711 (100%)
May 16, 2018	Vancouver	Canada	Pacific Coliseum	Lamb of God; Anthrax; Behemoth; Testament	—
May 17, 2018	Penticton	Canada	South Okanagan Events Centre	Lamb of God; Anthrax; Behemoth; Testament	—
May 19, 2018	Calgary	Canada	The Big Four	Lamb of God; Anthrax; Behemoth; Testament	—
May 20, 2018	Edmonton	Canada	Shaw Conference Centre	Lamb of God; Anthrax; Behemoth; Testament	—
May 22, 2018	Winnipeg	Canada	Bell MTS Place	Lamb of God; Anthrax; Behemoth; Testament	—
May 24, 2018	Minneapolis	United States	The Armory	Lamb of God; Anthrax; Behemoth; Testament	—
May 25, 2018	Tinley Park	United States	Hollywood Casino Amphitheatre	Lamb of God; Anthrax; Behemoth; Testament	22,176 / 22,176 (100%)
May 27, 2018	Sterling Heights	United States	Michigan Lottery Amphitheatre at Freedom Hill	Lamb of God; Anthrax; Behemoth; Testament	—
May 29, 2018	Toronto	Canada	Budweiser Stage	Lamb of God; Anthrax; Behemoth; Testament	—
May 30, 2018	Laval	Canada	Place Bell	Lamb of God; Anthrax; Behemoth; Testament	9,266 / 9,266 (100%)
June 1, 2018	Uncasville	United States	Mohegan Sun Arena	Lamb of God; Anthrax; Behemoth; Testament	6,391 / 6,391 (100%)
June 2, 2018	Holmdel	United States	PNC Bank Arts Center	Lamb of God; Anthrax; Behemoth; Testament	—
June 4, 2018	Reading	United States	Santander Arena	Lamb of God; Anthrax; Behemoth; Testament	—
June 6, 2018	Cincinnati	United States	Riverbend Music Center	Lamb of God; Anthrax; Behemoth; Testament	—
June 7, 2018	Cuyahoga Falls	United States	Blossom Music Center	Lamb of God; Anthrax; Behemoth; Testament	—
June 9, 2018	Burgettstown	United States	KeyBank Pavilion	Lamb of God; Anthrax; Behemoth; Testament	—
June 10, 2018	Bristow	United States	Jiffy Lube Live	Lamb of God; Anthrax; Behemoth; Testament	—
June 12, 2018	Virginia Beach	United States	Veterans United Home Loans Amphitheater	Lamb of God; Anthrax; Behemoth; Testament	—
June 14, 2018	Charlotte	United States	PNC Music Pavilion	Lamb of God; Anthrax; Behemoth; Testament	—
June 15, 2018	Orlando	United States	Orlando Amphitheater	Lamb of God; Anthrax; Behemoth; Testament	—
June 17, 2018	Sugar Land	United States	Smart Financial Centre	Lamb of God; Anthrax; Behemoth; Testament	—
June 19, 2018	Dallas	United States	The Bomb Factory	Lamb of God; Anthrax; Behemoth; Testament	—
June 20, 2018	Austin	United States	Austin360 Amphitheater	Lamb of God; Anthrax; Behemoth; Testament	—
Europe
June 23, 2018	Reykjavík	Iceland	Secret Solstice Festival	—N/a	—N/a
North America
July 26, 2018	Gilford	United States	Bank of New Hampshire Pavilion	Lamb of God; Anthrax; Testament; Napalm Death	—
July 27, 2018	Bangor	United States	Impact Music Festival	Lamb of God; Anthrax; Testament; Napalm Death	—
July 29, 2018	Wantagh	United States	Jones Beach Theater	Lamb of God; Anthrax; Testament; Napalm Death	—
July 31, 2018	Scranton	United States	The Pavilion	Lamb of God; Anthrax; Testament; Napalm Death	—
August 1, 2018	Albany	United States	Times Union Center	Lamb of God; Anthrax; Testament; Napalm Death	—
August 3, 2018	Darien	United States	Darien Lake Performing Arts Center	Lamb of God; Anthrax; Testament; Napalm Death	—
August 4, 2018	Syracuse	United States	Lakeview Amphitheater	Lamb of God; Anthrax; Testament; Napalm Death	—
August 6, 2018	London	Canada	Budweiser Gardens	Lamb of God; Anthrax; Testament; Napalm Death	—
August 7, 2018	Grand Rapids	United States	Van Andel Arena	Lamb of God; Anthrax; Testament; Napalm Death	—
August 9, 2018	Maryland Heights	United States	Hollywood Casino Amphitheatre	Lamb of God; Anthrax; Testament; Napalm Death	—
August 10, 2018	Atlanta	United States	Cellairis Amphitheatre at Lakewood	Lamb of God; Anthrax; Testament; Napalm Death	—
August 12, 2018	Nashville	United States	Nashville Municipal Auditorium	Lamb of God; Anthrax; Testament; Napalm Death	—
August 13, 2018	Rogers	United States	Walmart Arkansas Music Pavilion	Lamb of God; Anthrax; Testament; Napalm Death	—
August 15, 2018	San Antonio	United States	Freeman Coliseum	Lamb of God; Anthrax; Testament; Napalm Death	—
August 16, 2018	Oklahoma City	United States	The Zoo Amphitheatre	Lamb of God; Anthrax; Testament; Napalm Death	—
August 18, 2018	Greenwood Village	United States	Fiddler's Green Amphitheatre	Lamb of God; Anthrax; Testament; Napalm Death	—
August 19, 2018	West Valley City	United States	USANA Amphitheatre	Lamb of God; Anthrax; Testament; Napalm Death	—
August 21, 2018	Nampa	United States	Ford Idaho Center Amphitheater	Lamb of God; Anthrax; Testament; Napalm Death	—
August 23, 2018	Ridgefield	United States	Sunlight Supply Amphitheater	Lamb of God; Anthrax; Testament; Napalm Death	—
August 24, 2018	Auburn	United States	White River Amphitheatre	Lamb of God; Anthrax; Testament; Napalm Death	—
August 26, 2018	San Jose	United States	SAP Center	Lamb of God; Anthrax; Testament; Napalm Death	—
October 7, 2018	Teotihuacan	Mexico	ForceFest	—N/a	—N/a
Europe
November 1, 2018	Dublin	Ireland	3Arena	Lamb of God; Anthrax; Obituary	—
November 3, 2018	London	England	Wembley Arena	Lamb of God; Anthrax; Obituary	10,749 / 11,081
November 5, 2018	Cardiff	Wales	Motorpoint Arena Cardiff	Lamb of God; Anthrax; Obituary	—
November 7, 2018	Birmingham	England	Arena Birmingham	Lamb of God; Anthrax; Obituary	—
November 9, 2018	Manchester	England	Manchester Arena	Lamb of God; Anthrax; Obituary	—
November 10, 2018	Newcastle	England	Metro Radio Arena	Lamb of God; Anthrax; Obituary	—
November 12, 2018	Glasgow	Scotland	SSE Hydro	Lamb of God; Anthrax; Obituary	—
November 14, 2018	Dortmund	Germany	Westfalenhallen	Lamb of God; Anthrax; Obituary	—
November 15, 2018	Zwolle	Netherlands	IJsselhallen	Lamb of God; Anthrax; Obituary	—
November 17, 2018	Madrid	Spain	Palacio Vistalegre	Lamb of God; Anthrax; Obituary	—
November 18, 2018	Barcelona	Spain	Palau Sant Jordi	Lamb of God; Anthrax; Obituary	—
November 20, 2018	Milan	Italy	Mediolanum Forum	Lamb of God; Anthrax; Obituary	—
November 22, 2018	Zürich	Switzerland	Halle 622	Lamb of God; Anthrax; Obituary	—
November 23, 2018	Vienna	Austria	Wiener Stadthalle	Lamb of God; Anthrax; Obituary	—
November 24, 2018	Freiburg	Germany	Stadthalle	Lamb of God; Anthrax; Obituary	—
November 26, 2018	Hamburg	Germany	Barclaycard Arena	Lamb of God; Anthrax; Obituary	—
November 27, 2018	Łódź	Poland	Atlas Arena	Lamb of God; Anthrax; Obituary	—
November 29, 2018	Munich	Germany	Olympiahalle	Lamb of God; Anthrax; Obituary	—
November 30, 2018	Erfurt	Germany	Messe Erfurt	Lamb of God; Anthrax; Obituary	—
December 2, 2018	Berlin	Germany	Mercedes-Benz Arena	Lamb of God; Anthrax; Obituary	9,218 / 13,322
December 3, 2018	Copenhagen	Denmark	Royal Arena	Lamb of God; Anthrax; Obituary	—
December 5, 2018	Stockholm	Sweden	Hovet	Lamb of God; Anthrax; Obituary	—
December 6, 2018	Oslo	Norway	Oslo Spektrum	Lamb of God; Anthrax; Obituary	—
December 8, 2018	Helsinki	Finland	Helsinki Ice Hall	Lamb of God; Anthrax; Obituary	—
Oceania
March 7, 2019	Brisbane	Australia	Riverstage	Anthrax; Behemoth	—
March 9, 2019	Sydney	Australia	Download Festival	—N/a	—N/a
March 11, 2019	Melbourne	Australia	Download Festival	—N/a	—N/a
March 13, 2019	Adelaide	Australia	Adelaide Entertainment Centre	Anthrax; Behemoth	—
March 15, 2019	Auckland	New Zealand	Eventfinda Stadium	Anthrax	—
Asia
March 21, 2019	Chiba	Japan	Download Festival	—N/a	—N/a
March 23, 2019	Quezon City	Philippines	Amoranto Stadium	—N/a	—N/a
North America
May 2, 2019	Phoenix	United States	Ak-Chin Pavilion	Lamb of God; Amon Amarth; Cannibal Corpse	—
May 3, 2019	Albuquerque	United States	Isleta Amphitheater	Lamb of God; Amon Amarth; Cannibal Corpse	—
May 5, 2019	El Paso	United States	Don Haskins Center	Lamb of God; Amon Amarth; Cannibal Corpse	—
May 7, 2019	Edinburg	United States	Bert Ogden Arena	Lamb of God; Amon Amarth; Cannibal Corpse	—
May 8, 2019	Irving	United States	Toyota Music Factory	Lamb of God; Amon Amarth; Cannibal Corpse	—
May 10, 2019	Tampa	United States	MidFlorida Credit Union Amphitheatre	Lamb of God; Amon Amarth; Cannibal Corpse	—
May 11, 2019	West Palm Beach	United States	Coral Sky Amphitheatre	Lamb of God; Amon Amarth; Cannibal Corpse	—
May 13, 2019	Huntington	United States	Big Sandy Superstore Arena	Lamb of God; Amon Amarth; Cannibal Corpse	—
May 14, 2019	Columbia	United States	Merriweather Post Pavilion	Lamb of God; Amon Amarth; Cannibal Corpse	—
May 16, 2019	Noblesville	United States	Ruoff Home Mortgage Music Center	Lamb of God; Amon Amarth; Cannibal Corpse	—
May 17, 2019	Bonner Springs	United States	Providence Medical Center Amphitheater	Lamb of God; Amon Amarth; Cannibal Corpse	—
May 19, 2019	Clarkston	United States	DTE Energy Music Theatre	Lamb of God; Amon Amarth; Cannibal Corpse	—
May 20, 2019	Youngstown	United States	Covelli Centre	Lamb of God; Amon Amarth; Cannibal Corpse	—
May 22, 2019	Ottawa	Canada	Canadian Tire Centre	Lamb of God; Amon Amarth; Cannibal Corpse	—
May 24, 2019	Camden	United States	BB&T Pavilion	Lamb of God; Amon Amarth; Cannibal Corpse	—
May 25, 2019	Mansfield	United States	Xfinity Center	Lamb of God; Amon Amarth; Cannibal Corpse	—
Europe
June 4, 2019	Gliwice	Poland	Gliwice Arena	Behemoth	—
June 6, 2019	Sölvesborg	Sweden	Sweden Rock Festival	—N/a	—N/a
June 8, 2019	Nürburg	Germany	Rock am Ring	—N/a	—N/a
June 9, 2019	Nuremberg	Germany	Rock im Park	—N/a	—N/a
June 11, 2019	Budapest	Hungary	László Papp Budapest Sports Arena	Anthrax	—
June 13, 2019	Leipzig	Germany	Arena Leipzig	Anthrax; Alien Weaponry	—
June 14, 2019	Nickelsdorf	Austria	Nova Rock Festival	—N/a	—N/a
June 16, 2019	Castle Donington	England	Download Festival	—N/a	—N/a
June 19, 2019	Geneva	Switzerland	SEG Geneva Arena	Anthrax	—
June 21, 2019	Dessel	Belgium	Graspop Metal Meeting	—N/a	—N/a
June 23, 2019	Clisson	France	Hellfest	—N/a	—N/a
June 25, 2019	Prague	Czech Republic	Tipsport Arena	Anthrax	—
June 28, 2019	Oslo	Norway	Tons Of Rock	—N/a	—N/a
June 29, 2019	Helsinki	Finland	Tuska Open Air	—N/a	—N/a
July 3, 2019	Viveiro	Spain	Resurrection Fest	—N/a	—N/a
July 5, 2019	Lisbon	Portugal	Vagos Open Air	—N/a	—N/a
July 7, 2019	Verona	Italy	Rock the Castle	—N/a	—N/a
July 10, 2019	Bucharest	Romania	Metalheadmeeting	—N/a	—N/a
July 11, 2019	Sofia	Bulgaria	Sofia Airport Park	Satyricon	—
July 13, 2019	Athens	Greece	AthensRocks	Rotting Christ; Suicidal Angels; Leprous	—N/a
North America
July 26, 2019	Edmonton	Canada	Chaos AB Festival	—N/a	—N/a
July 28, 2019	Montreal	Canada	Heavy Montréal	—N/a	—N/a
Europe
August 2, 2019	Wacken	Germany	Wacken Open Air	—N/a	—N/a
August 3, 2019	Stuttgart	Germany	Hanns-Martin-Schleyer-Halle	Anthrax; Alien Weaponry	—
North America
September 13, 2019	Chicago	United States	Riot Fest	—N/a	—N/a
South America
September 27, 2019	Quito	Ecuador	Coliseo General Rumiñahui	Profecía	—
September 29, 2019	Buenos Aires	Argentina	Estadio Luna Park	—	—
October 2, 2019	São Paulo	Brazil	Espaco das Américas	Claustrofobia	—
October 4, 2019	Rio de Janeiro	Brazil	Rock In Rio	—	—
October 6, 2019	Santiago	Chile	Gets Louder Festival	Anthrax; Kreator; Pentagram Chile	26,000 / 26,000 (100%)
October 8, 2019	Viña del Mar	Chile	Sporting Club	Anthrax	5,000 / 5,000 (100%)
North America
October 11, 2019	Manchester	United States	Exit 111 Festival	—N/a	—N/a
November 2, 2019	Asheville	United States	ExploreAsheville.com Arena	Primus; Ministry; Philip H. Anselmo & The Illegals	6,014
November 3, 2019	Raleigh	United States	PNC Arena	Primus; Ministry; Philip H. Anselmo & The Illegals	7,011
November 5, 2019	Salem	United States	Salem Civic Center	Primus; Ministry; Philip H. Anselmo & The Illegals	3,861
November 6, 2019	Hershey	United States	Giant Center	Primus; Ministry; Philip H. Anselmo & The Illegals	—
November 8, 2019	Springfield	United States	MassMutual Center	Primus; Ministry; Philip H. Anselmo & The Illegals	5,913
November 9, 2019	New York City	United States	Madison Square Garden	Primus; Ministry; Philip H. Anselmo & The Illegals	—
November 11, 2019	Louisville	United States	KFC Yum! Center	Primus; Ministry; Philip H. Anselmo & The Illegals	—
November 12, 2019	Columbus	United States	Nationwide Arena	Primus; Ministry; Philip H. Anselmo & The Illegals	—
November 14, 2019	Moline	United States	TaxSlayer Center	Primus; Ministry; Philip H. Anselmo & The Illegals	—
November 15, 2019	Sioux Falls	United States	Denny Sanford Premier Center	Primus; Ministry; Philip H. Anselmo & The Illegals	—
November 17, 2019	Fargo	United States	Fargodome	Primus; Ministry; Philip H. Anselmo & The Illegals	—
November 18, 2019	Omaha	United States	CHI Health Center	Primus; Ministry; Philip H. Anselmo & The Illegals	—
November 20, 2019	Colorado Springs	United States	Broadmoor World Arena	Primus; Ministry; Philip H. Anselmo & The Illegals	—
November 22, 2019	Billings	United States	Rimrock Auto Arena	Primus; Ministry; Philip H. Anselmo & The Illegals	—
November 24, 2019	Spokane	United States	Spokane Arena	Primus; Ministry; Philip H. Anselmo & The Illegals	—
November 26, 2019	Oakland	United States	Oakland Arena	Primus; Ministry; Philip H. Anselmo & The Illegals	10,999 / 13,729 (80%)
November 27, 2019	Las Vegas	United States	MGM Grand Garden Arena	Primus; Ministry; Philip H. Anselmo & The Illegals	—
November 29, 2019	Inglewood	United States	The Forum	Primus; Ministry; Philip H. Anselmo & The Illegals	23,029 / 23,029 (100%)
November 30, 2019	Inglewood	United States	The Forum	Primus; Ministry; Philip H. Anselmo & The Illegals	23,029 / 23,029 (100%)

=== Cancelled dates ===
List of cancelled concerts, showing date, city, country, venue and reason for cancellation
Date	City	Country	Venue	Reason	Ref.
March 17, 2019	Christchurch	New Zealand	Horncastle Arena	Christchurch mosque shootings	

== Personnel ==
- Tom Araya – vocals, bass
- Kerry King – guitars
- Paul Bostaph – drums
- Gary Holt – guitars

=== Touring musicians ===
- Phil Demmel – guitars (December 3, 2018 – December 8, 2018; sub for Holt)
