= Blood In, Blood Out (Exodus album) =

Studio album by Exodus
- Released: October 14, 2014
- Recorded: March–July 2014
- Studios: Goats 'R Us Ranch & Studios, Briones, Bay Area, California; Studio D, Sausalito, California
- Genre: Thrash metal
- Length: 62:14
- Label: Nuclear Blast
- Producer: Exodus

Exodus chronology
Exhibit B: The Human Condition (2010)	Blood In, Blood Out (2014)	Persona Non Grata (2021)

Singles from Blood In, Blood Out
- 1. "Salt the Wound" Released: September 10, 2014; 2. "Blood In, Blood Out" Released: September 24, 2014

Blood In, Blood Out is the eleventh studio album by American thrash metal band Exodus. It was released on October 14, 2014 through Nuclear Blast, and is the band's first album with vocalist Steve "Zetro" Souza since 2004's Tempo of the Damned. The album also saw a reunion with original guitarist Kirk Hammett, who plays the guitar solo on "Salt the Wound". Blood In, Blood Out received generally favorable critical reviews, and it entered the Billboard 200 at number 38—the band's highest U.S. chart position to date. Exodus promoted the album with its first concert tour with Souza since he left the band in 2004, due to a feud with guitarist Gary Holt.

== Writing and recording ==
Asked in June 2012 if Exodus had plans to record a tenth studio album, bassist Jack Gibson stated that the band was "way overdue to do it." Then he added, "I know that Gary has songs, and Lee has some stuff — they've been coming up with stuff — [but] we just really haven't had the time to sit down and hammer it all out and then record it. That takes a few months together to make that happen, and we just haven't had the time, basically. But there is gonna be another album, for sure." Vocalist Rob Dukes stated that the album was going to be "fast and short", and added, "everybody fucking complained about how long the last one was, we're, like, 'Fuck 'em! We'll give them about a fucking 38-minute record. I don't know. I'm just talking shit. I don't know what we're gonna do. We've got no plan. We're just going with what feels right. If we end up with another 74-minute record, so be it." Dukes was also asked who would end up producing the album, and his response was, "I don't know yet. There are a couple of people on the table. I think Andy [Sneap, producer of Exhibit B: The Human Condition] is taking some time off; I don't know if he's gonna do it with us again."

In an October 2013 interview with The Washington Times, guitarist Gary Holt stated that he would take a break from touring with Slayer until April to focus on finishing the new Exodus album. He also announced that the band would start recording the album in February. Asked about the progress of the songwriting sessions for drummer Tom Hunting replied, "It's a pretty old-school process, actually. Gary will put some riffs on a CD, or even a cassette, depending on which vehicle I'm driving. He feeds the riff to me, and then I put a beat to it, and we work it all out, and then we come together as a band and arrange it. Rob is really not in the room for the musical process. We're gonna probably do some more pre-production for this one, 'cause our bass player now knows about Pro Tools and is really computer savvy. None of the rest of us are, really. It's a fun process. I love the process of recording; it's my favorite thing. It's like construction; you're taking raw wood and building something. Gary likes to say he makes moonshine and Lee makes fine wine, 'cause Lee will dissect his own parts and rebuild it here, change something there, add an overdub there, or whatever...But it's a fun process; I love it. You're building something, and it's yours."

Gibson indeed ended up being responsible for engineering the guitar and vocal tracks; he has been working with Pro Tools for other projects and eventually took a course on how to operate the software himself. Come recording time, the busy schedule of Andy Sneap prevented the band from relying on Sneap for tracking, and Gibson stepped up as the engineer.

By March 2014, Exodus had begun recording their tenth album at Goats 'R Us Ranch & Studios in San Francisco Bay Area in Northern California. Holt commented that they were "well into drum tracks; everything is going super smooth and Tom is just killing it! Best drum sound this band has ever laid down — sounds just simply pummeling!" He also stated that the band had "only one more song left to lay down and some B-sides to go." Asked about the musical direction of the album, Dukes replied, "This album is very fast and has more of a punk rock feel to it, whereas I think the last few Exodus albums were metal epics, with longer songs. These songs are shorter and a little faster. It has a really different feel to it. It sounds great."

On June 8, 2014, it was announced that Dukes had been fired from the band, and was replaced by his predecessor Steve "Zetro" Souza. On the day after, Holt announced that Souza would start recording vocals on the new album. Souza co-wrote at least one song on the album with bassist Jack Gibson and guitarist Lee Altus, now known as "Body Harvest".

The album features an industrial hip hop tinged intro on the opening track "Black 13" produced by Dan the Automator; Holt explained the intro was done in a short period of time using the casual acquaintance Holt and Dan built up over the years.

== Release and promotion ==
The albums first single "Salt the Wound" was released on September 10, 2014, alongside an official lyric video. The second and final single the albums title track was released on September 24, a music video was later released on October 27.

To support Blood In, Blood Out, Exodus embarked on their first major tour with Souza since 2004. They toured South America in October 2014, and embarked on a U.S. tour with Slayer and Suicidal Tendencies in November and December. In April and May 2015, Exodus (along with Shattered Sun) was a supporting act for Testament on their Dark Roots of Thrash II tour. Following this, the band toured Europe in May and June, including two consecutive nights at the Underworld in London. Prior to the Dark Roots of Thrash II tour, the band played Australia's Soundwave in February and March, and then played three shows in Japan. From October to December 2015, Exodus toured North American with King Diamond. Souza said that Exodus would continue to tour in support of Blood In, Blood Out until the fall of 2016, and then begin work on a new album for a 2017 release; however, Persona Non Grata would not be released until 2021.

== Critical reception ==
Professional ratings
Review scores
Source	Rating
AllMusic	3.5/5 stars
All About the Rock	8/10
Blabbermouth.net	9/10
Classic Rock	4/5 stars
Exclaim!	8/10
The Guardian	4/5 stars
Kerrang!	3/5 stars
Metal.de	10/10
Metal Hammer	4/5 stars
Punknews.org (staff)	4/5 stars

Blood In, Blood Out has received mostly positive reviews. James Christopher Monger of AllMusic rated the album three-and-a-half stars out of five, and states, "Band and ex/current/deceased lead singer acrimony aside, the 11- track Blood In, Blood Out mostly crushes it, offering up a pulverizing set of textbook thrash-induced mayhem that somehow manages to sound both classic and vital."

Blood In, Blood Out received another positive review from Ray Van Horn, Jr. of Blabbermouth.net, who gave the album a rating of nine out of ten and states, "As Souza last appeared on Exodus' 2004 Tempo of the Damned album, for most fans, Blood In, Blood Out is going to ring true, no matter how monstrously heavy the band was with Dukes at the helm. For all of the hullabaloos behind Zetro's past tenures in Exodus, he's all over this album in a major way and by attrition, the band throws its own retro, gang-shouting speed metal party, one finding Metallica (and one-time Exodus) guitarist Kirk Hammett on the guest list." "Metal.de added "With Blood In, Blood Out, EXODUS have not only released their strongest record since *Tempo of the Damned* but have also launched the thrash album of the year into the stratosphere. "Good friendly violent fun" at its best, so to speak. You can dock me one point for my fandom, but the rest of my assessment stands rock-solid."

All About The Rock writer Joe Reed scored the album 8 out of 10, and said, "Recorded in the Bay Area, the albums sound blends the attitude and energy of the band's past with their musical growth and development over the years. Listenable, yet not overwhelming, I think it captures the band's early material with their more recent body of work quite well." The Guardian added "Guitarist Gary Holt seems incapable of writing a dud riff or a misfiring chorus, and so while this is an album aimed squarely at diehard metalheads, it’s also an imperious display of succinct songwriting that bulges with moments of refined catchiness … albeit of the variety that also seeks to shatter your jaw."

At the end of 2014, Brave Words & Bloody Knuckles ranked the album #5 on their 2014 "BravePicks" list. Loudwire ranked it #12 on their list of the Best Metal Albums of 2014 list, and OC Weekly ranked it at #7 on their list of the Best Metal Albums.

In terms of chart positions, Blood In, Blood Out was successful, and was Exodus' first album since 1990's Impact Is Imminent to enter the Billboard 200; the album itself peaked at #38 on the Billboard 200, making it Exodus' highest chart position so far, and their first album in 25 years to crack the top 100 since Fabulous Disaster (1989), which peaked at #82 on the Billboard 200. It also became the bands first album to achieve a #1 placement topping the UK Independent Album Breakers Chart. The album sold approximately 8,800 copies in its first week in the U.S.

== Track listing ==
All songs written by Gary Holt except where noted.

No.	Title	Lyrics	Music	Length
1.	"Black 13"			6:21
2.	"Blood In, Blood Out"			3:42
3.	"Collateral Damage"			5:27
4.	"Salt the Wound"			4:24
5.	"Body Harvest"	Jack Gibson, Steve "Zetro" Souza, Lee Altus	Altus	6:28
6.	"BTK"			6:56
7.	"Wrapped in the Arms of Rage"			4:30
8.	"My Last Nerve"			6:10
9.	"Numb"			6:13
10.	"Honor Killings"	Altus	Altus	5:42
11.	"Food for the Worms"			6:21
Total length:				62:14

Limited Edition / Digital Edition bonus track
No.	Title	Length
12.	"Angel of Death" (Angel Witch cover)	4:38
Total length:		66:52

Japanese Edition bonus track
No.	Title	Length
12.	"Protect Not Dissect" (The Varukers cover)	3:16
Total length:		65:30

== Personnel ==
Production and performance credits are adapted from the album liner notes.

Exodus

- Steve "Zetro" Souza – vocals
- Gary Holt – guitars
- Lee Altus – guitars
- Jack Gibson – bass
- Tom Hunting – drums, vocals on "Angel of Death"

Additional musicians

- Dan the Automator – intro on "Black 13"
- Kirk Hammett – first guitar solo on "Salt the Wound"
- Chuck Billy – additional vocals on "BTK" and "Blood In, Blood Out"
- Anthony "Rat" Martin – additional vocals on "Protect Not Dissect"

Production

- Exodus – production
- Andy Sneap – engineering (drums), mixing, mastering
- Jack Gibson – engineering (vocals, guitars & bass)
- Jason Victorine – additional engineering (drums)
- Matt Mullin – additional engineering (drums)
- Pär Olofsson – cover art
- Gustavo Sazes – layout
- Eus Straver – photography

Recording locations

- Recorded at Goats 'R Us Ranch & Studios (Tom Hunting's jam room), Briones, Bay Area, California, March–July 2014.
- Drums recorded at Recorded at Studio D, Sausalito, California, March–July 2014.
- Mixed & mastered at Backstage Studios, Derbyshire, England.

== Charts ==
Chart (2014)	Peak position
Austrian Albums (Ö3 Austria)	38
Belgian Albums (Ultratop Flanders)	130
Belgian Albums (Ultratop Wallonia)	82
Dutch Albums (Album Top 100)	85
Finnish Albums (Suomen virallinen lista)	30
French Albums (SNEP)	93
German Albums (Offizielle Top 100)	29
Scottish Albums (Official Charts)	68
Swiss Albums (Schweizer Hitparade)	30
UK Albums (Official Charts)	71
UK Independent Albums (Official Charts)	14
UK Rock & Metal Albums (Official Charts)	4
US Billboard 200	38
US Top Hard Rock Albums (Billboard)	2
US Top Rock Albums (Billboard)	11
US Independent Albums (Billboard)	6
