= Hatriot =

American thrash metal band

- Origin: Oakland, California, U.S.
- Genres: Thrash metal; melodic death metal
- Years active: 2011–present
- Label: none
- Members: Cody Souza; Nick Souza; Miguel Esparza; Justin Lam
- Past members: Steve Souza; Drew Gage; Kevin Paterson; Kosta V; Justin Sakogawa; Justin Cole; Alex Bent
- Website: hatriotband.com

Hatriot is an American thrash metal band formed in 2011 by former singer Steve "Zetro" Souza (Exodus) and guitarist Kosta Varvatakis. The band's current lineup includes Justin Lam and Miguel Esparza on guitars, Souza's sons Cody Souza on bass/lead vocals, and Nick Souza on drums.

They were contracted to Massacre Records from 2012-2024. Starting out as Northern Californian favorites, they have gone on several international tours. In summer of 2013, they played the Ernie Ball stage at Vans Warped tour. Later that year, they performed at Eindhoven Metal Meeting in Holland alongside Accept, Death Angel, Sabaton, Therion and more.

They released a four-song demo in 2011, and have since released four albums: Heroes of Origin (2013), Dawn of the New Centurion (2014), From Days unto Darkness (2019) and Vale of Shadows (2022).

In 2015, Steve Souza stepped down as frontman due to his commitments to Exodus. His son Cody took over lead vocals. Originally playing thrash metal, Hatriot switched to melodic death metal while retaining their thrash roots, concurrent with the release of their 2022 album, The Vale of Shadows.

The band toured in 2022 with Exmortus & Silver Talon, 2023 with Dave Elefson & Kings of Thrash, later in 2023 with Exmortus, Generation Kill & Claustrofobia, and in 2024 with Nervosa & Lich King. Hatriot were working on material for 2025.

== Members ==
=== Current members ===
- Cody Souza – bass (2011–present), lead vocals (2015–present), backing vocals (2011–2015)
- Nick Souza – drums (2012–present)
- Miguel Esparza – rhythm guitar (2011–2013, 2022–present)
- Justin Lam – lead guitar, backing vocals (2025–present)

=== Former members ===
- Kosta Varvatakis – lead guitar, backing vocals (2011–2025)
- Steve "Zetro" Souza – lead vocals (2011–2015)
- Alex Bent – drums (2011–2012)
- Drew Gage – rhythm guitar (2011)
- Justin Sakogawa – rhythm guitar (2014–2017)
- Justin Cole – rhythm guitar, backing vocals (2013–2014, 2017–2018)
- Kevin Paterson – rhythm guitar, backing vocals (2018–2022)

== Discography ==
=== Albums and Demos ===
- 2011: Hatriot (Demo)
- 2013: Heroes of Origin
- 2014: Dawn of the New Centurion
- 2019: From Days unto Darkness
- 2022: The Vale of Shadows

=== Singles ===
- 2011 "Weapons of Class Destruction"
- 2012 "Bloodstaind Wings"
- 2012: "The Violent Times of My Dark Passenger"
- 2013: "Murder American Style"
- 2014: "Dawn of the New Centurion"
- 2014: "The Fear Within"
- 2015: "The Fear Within" (Cody Souza Version)
- 2016: "Carnival of Execution"
- 2017: "Frankenstein Must Be Destroyed"
- 2019: "Organic Remains"
- 2019: "Ethereal Nightmare"
- 2020: "FMCDH - Cody Souza version"
- 2022: "Hymn For the Wicked"
- 2022: "Verminous & Vile"
- 2022: "Horns & Halos"
- 2024: "Forest of Illusion”
- 2025: "Serenity Will Follow"
