= Good Friendly Violent Fun =

Live album by Exodus
- Released: November 5, 1991
- Recorded: July 14, 1989
- Venue: The Fillmore (San Francisco)
- Genre: Thrash metal
- Length: 42:29
- Label: Relativity

Exodus chronology
Impact is Imminent (1990)	Good Friendly Violent Fun (1991)	Lessons in Violence (1992)

Professional ratings
Review scores
Source	Rating
AllMusic	2/5 stars

Good Friendly Violent Fun is a live album by American thrash metal band Exodus. The performance on this live album was from the band's 1989 tour, but not released until two years later. The album has not been made available for digital purchase or on digital streaming platforms. The album's name is derived from a lyric in the band's song "The Toxic Waltz", from their 1989 album Fabulous Disaster.

== Track listing ==
1. Fabulous Disaster – 5:46
2. Chemi-Kill – 6:09
3. 'Til Death Do Us Part – 5:07
4. The Toxic Waltz – 4:39
5. Cajun Hell – 5:55
6. Corruption – 5:37
7. Brain Dead – 4:31
8. Dirty Deeds Done Dirt Cheap – 4:42 (AC/DC cover)

== Personnel ==
Exodus

- Steve "Zetro" Souza – lead vocals
- Gary Holt – guitars, backing vocals
- Rick Hunolt – guitars, backing vocals
- Rob McKillop – bass
- John Tempesta – drums

Additional credits

- Recorded on July 14, 1989, at The Fillmore in San Francisco
- Recorded by Westwood One
- Mixed by Marc Senesac (assisted by Kyle Johnson) at Soma Sync Studio in San Francisco
- Mastered by Ken Lee at the Rocket Lab in San Francisco
- Artwork by Sean Wyett
- Design by Kathy Milone
- Photos by Ienny Raisler and Gene Ambo
