= Fabulous Disaster =

Studio album by Exodus
- Released: January 30, 1989
- Recorded: September–October 1988
- Studios: Alpha & Omega, San Francisco, California
- Genre: Thrash metal
- Length: 45:20
- Label: Combat/Relativity
- Producers: Gary Holt, Rick Hunolt, Marc Senesac

Exodus chronology
Pleasures of the Flesh (1987)	Fabulous Disaster (1989)	Impact Is Imminent (1990)

Fabulous Disaster is the third studio album by American thrash metal band Exodus. It was released on January 30, 1989 on the UK label Music for Nations, while the US version was released on Combat/Relativity Records. In 1999, Century Media remastered and reissued the band's first three albums in Europe only.

Fabulous Disaster was Tom Hunting's last release with Exodus until the 1997 live album Another Lesson in Violence. Additionally, it was the first Exodus album not to feature a lineup change from after one consecutive studio album, and one of two albums to include two song covers (the other being 1992's Force of Habit).

== Tour ==
Exodus toured for five months to promote Fabulous Disaster. The band embarked on a month-long European tour with Nuclear Assault and Acid Reign. In the spring of 1989, Exodus landed a supporting slot for the Headbangers Ball tour with Anthrax and Helloween, exposing the band to a wide thrash metal audience. Exodus then embarked on another North American tour, which lasted from May to July 1989; supporting acts were Sick of It All, Faith or Fear, Forbidden, Dead Orchestra and Wehrmacht. The band wrapped up the tour at The Fillmore on July 14, 1989; this show was recorded on the band's first live album Good Friendly Violent Fun, which was released two years later.

== Reception ==
Professional ratings
Review scores
Source	Rating
AllMusic	4/5 stars
Collector's Guide to Heavy Metal	6/10
Kerrang!	4.75/5

In a contemporary review, Kerrang! journalist Don Kaye praised the album and paired it to Bonded by Blood for confidence and aggression, qualities which were slightly missing in Pleasures of the Flesh. He judged Fabulous Disaster as "one of the very best of the genre in 1989."

Fabulous Disaster received a positive modern review from AllMusic's Eduardo Rivadavia, who stated that Exodus "went on to create their most diverse and carefully conceived effort yet, while remaining faithful to their no-frills thrash ethic." He then added that "the album represented the realization of their vision, as well as their commercial peak" but "still failed to gain them their well-deserved place alongside such thrash metal giants as Megadeth, Metallica, Anthrax and Slayer." By contrast, Canadian journalist Martin Popoff remarked how Exodus remained the "last custodians of a manic but toneless thrash, high on allegiance, low on hummability" and easily forgettable.

Fabulous Disaster debuted at No. 82 on the Billboard 200. No singles were released to promote the album, but the songs "The Toxic Waltz" and "Low Rider" got regular airplay on radio stations, including Los Angeles, California radio station KNAC. A video was made for "The Toxic Waltz", which received a good amount of airplay on MTV's Headbangers Ball. The lead off track, "The Last Act of Defiance" was inspired by the New Mexico State Penitentiary riot that took place in February 1980.

== Track listing ==
All tracks are written by Exodus, except where noted.

No.	Title	Writer(s)	Length
1.	"The Last Act of Defiance"		4:44
2.	"Fabulous Disaster"		4:54
3.	"The Toxic Waltz"		4:51
4.	"Low Rider" (War cover)	War, Jerry Goldstein	2:48
5.	"Cajun Hell"		6:05
6.	"Like Father, Like Son"		8:11
7.	"Corruption"		5:46
8.	"Verbal Razors"		4:07
9.	"Open Season"		3:54
Total length:			45:20

Bonus track on CD and black-on-black vinyl issues
No.	Title	Writer(s)	Length
10.	"Overdose" (AC/DC cover)	Angus Young, Malcolm Young, Bon Scott	5:31

== Personnel ==
Exodus

- Steve "Zetro" Souza – vocals
- Gary Holt – guitars
- Rick Hunolt – guitars
- Rob McKillop – bass
- Tom Hunting – drums

Additional musicians

- Dov Christopher – intro vocals on track 1, harmonica on track 5
- Brian Mantilla – additional percussion on track 4

Production

- Marc Senesac – production, engineering, mixing
- Gary Holt – production, mixing
- Rick Hunolt – production, mixing
- David Plank – engineering
- Chad Munsey – mixing assistant
- Bernie Grundman – mastering

Artwork

- Gene Ambo – photos
- David Bett – art direction
- Patricia Lie – design

== Charts ==
Year	Chart	Position
1989	Dutch MegaCharts	57
1989	UK Albums Chart	67
1989	US Billboard 200	82
