= Force of Habit =

Studio album by Exodus
- Released: August 25, 1992
- Recorded: 1992
- Studios: Battery (London); Record Plant (Sausalito, California)
- Genres: Thrash metal Groove metal
- Length: 68:41
- Label: Capitol
- Producer: Chris Tsangarides

Exodus chronology
Lessons in Violence (1992)	Force of Habit (1992)	Another Lesson in Violence (1997)

Force of Habit is the fifth studio album by American thrash metal band Exodus, released on August 25, 1992, by Capitol Records. The sound of this album was a departure from the band's previous albums, focusing on a rather slower and experimental sound, which presented a groove metal style. Many of the song titles are common figures of speech.

Force of Habit was Exodus's last release until their 1997 live album Another Lesson in Violence and their last studio album until 2004's Tempo of the Damned, as the band went on two extended hiatuses. This is Exodus's last album to feature John Tempesta on drums and is also their only album to feature Mike Butler on bass as well as the band's only release without the jagged edged "Exodus" logo that had appeared on all of the band's previous and subsequent releases. It was later re-released in 2008 in a limited edition mini-album packaging to resemble the original vinyl release, including the inner sleeve. This version was remastered and includes the bonus tracks from the Japanese release. Force of Habit was also the second and last Exodus album to include more than one cover song (the other being 1989's Fabulous Disaster).

== Reception ==
Professional ratings
Review scores
Source	Rating
AllMusic	3/5 stars
Collector's Guide to Heavy Metal	8/10

Force of Habit received a mixed review from AllMusic's Roch Parisien, who stated that "Exodus slows the pace a notch, drops the guitars a register, and gives the thrash a little room to breathe." Guitarist Gary Holt stated on Metal Evolution that Force of Habit is his least favorite Exodus album. Martin Popoff in his Collector's Guide to Heavy Metal welcomed the slower tempos and described the album as "earth-shattering heavy" and a great improvement in "vocals, lyrics, everything".

Despite the album's mixed reception – and the fact that it did not chart on the Billboard 200 (like Exodus' previous three albums did) – the music videos for "Thorn in My Side" and "Good Day to Die" received considerable airplay by Headbangers Ball on MTV; the former was featured in "What's the Deal?", a 1995 episode of Beavis and Butt-head.

== Track listing ==
No.	Title	Writer(s)	Length
1.	"Thorn in My Side"	Gary Holt, Steve Souza	4:06
2.	"Me, Myself and I"	Rick Hunolt, Holt	5:03
3.	"Force of Habit"	Holt, Souza	4:19
4.	"Bitch" (The Rolling Stones cover)	Jagger–Richards	2:48
5.	"Fuel for the Fire"	Holt, Souza	6:04
6.	"One Foot in the Grave"	Holt	5:19
7.	"Count Your Blessings"	Holt, Hunolt	7:31
8.	"Climb Before the Fall"	Hunolt, Holt, Souza	5:38
9.	"Architect of Pain"	Holt	11:02
10.	"When It Rains It Pours"	Holt	4:20
11.	"Good Day to Die"	Holt, Hunolt, Souza	4:48
12.	"Pump It Up" (Elvis Costello & the Attractions cover)	Elvis Costello	3:10
13.	"Feeding Time at the Zoo"	Michael Butler, Holt, Hunolt, Souza, John Tempesta	4:33
Total length:			68:41

2008 re-issue bonus tracks
No.	Title	Writer(s)	Length
14.	"Crawl Before You Walk"	Butler, Holt, Hunolt, Souza, Tempesta	3:59
15.	"Telepathetic"	Butler, Holt, Hunolt, Souza, Tempesta	4:48
Total length:			77:28

== Personnel ==
Exodus

- Steve "Zetro" Souza – vocals
- Gary Holt – guitars
- Rick Hunolt – guitars
- Michael Butler – bass
- John Tempesta – drums

Additional musicians

- Tower of Power Horn Section: Brandon Fields, Emilio Castillo, Greg Adams, Lee Thornburg, Stephen "Doc" Kupka – horns on track 4

Production

- Produced and engineered by Chris Tsangarides
- Assistant engineered by Chris Marshall and Sarah Bedingham
- Mixed by Steve Thompson and Michael Barbiero at Riversound, New York City
- Additional recording and remixing by Marc Senesac at The Plant, Sausalito, California
- Mastered by George Marino at Sterling Sound, New York City
- Artwork by Ralph Steadman
