= Persona Non Grata (Exodus album) =

Studio album by Exodus
- Released: November 19, 2021
- Recorded: September – October 2020
- Studios: Tom Hunting's three home studios in Lake Almanor, California
- Genre: Thrash metal
- Length: 60:22
- Label: Nuclear Blast
- Producer: Exodus

Exodus chronology
Blood In, Blood Out (2014)	Persona Non Grata (2021)	Goliath (2026)

Singles from Persona Non Grata
- 1. "The Beatings Will Continue (Until Morale Improves)" Released: August 20, 2021; 2. "Clickbait" Released: September 17, 2021; 3. "The Years of Death and Dying" Released: October 15, 2021; 4. "Prescribing Horror" Released: November 19, 2021

Persona Non Grata is the twelfth studio album by American thrash metal band Exodus, released on November 19, 2021. It was their first studio album since Blood In, Blood Out in 2014, and is the last album to feature vocalist Steve "Zetro" Souza before he departed from the band again in 2025. This album also features guest appearances from former Exodus guitarist Rick Hunolt and guitarist Lee Altus' bandmate in Heathen, Kragen Lum, who both provide guitar solos on one of the album's tracks, "Lunatic-Liar-Lord". This is the band's final album to be released through Nuclear Blast, with whom the band signed in 2003.

Plans for the follow-up to Blood In, Blood Out were made as early as 2016, and work on the album had been slowed down by relentless tour schedules and guitarist Gary Holt's commitments with Slayer, until the latter disbanded in 2019 following a farewell tour; as such, it is the first Exodus studio album to be released since Slayer's disbandment. The recording sessions of Persona Non Grata took place from September to October 2020, with the album being fully completed in January 2021. The album was initially set for release in the summer of 2021, but it was pushed back to November, due to drummer Tom Hunting's diagnosis with squamous cell carcinoma of the stomach.

== Background ==
After leaving Exodus in 2004 amid a bitter feud between himself and guitarist Gary Holt, frontman Steve "Zetro" Souza returned to the band in June 2014, and appeared on their tenth studio album Blood In, Blood Out, released four months later. The album received positive reviews and the band spent more than two years touring behind it. When asked in a June 2016 interview with The Age of Metal when Exodus were going to release a new album, Souza said, "I hate to speak for everybody, because one of our members [guitarist Gary Holt] plays in Slayer, which is very important to us and to him as well. And, actually, Gary is the main songwriter and has always been in Exodus. And so we'll have to, obviously, look at his schedule, but just having, actually, conversations with him since we've been home [off the road] and conversations with Tom, I mean, we know we need to keep new music going. And 2017 would be… Say it was towards the end of 2017… That would be three years since my return [to the band] and three years since Blood In, Blood Out came out. So I think that's fair to say you should be able to put a record out in that amount of time. And we've always been able to write an album in an… like, come home and concentrate on it, and within five or six months, we have it written and done — even less [time] than that. We know what we're doing. We know Exodus. We've been doing this for so many years. It's just like getting on a bicycle and riding it."

In a May 2017 interview with Metal Wani, Souza stated that Exodus would enter the studio around October or November to begin recording their eleventh studio album for a March 2018 release. Drummer Tom Hunting added, "We're just structuring songs right now. I think we've probably got five or six maybe, and the makings for the rest of 'em — bits and pieces here and there." Souza explained that the material did not sound like a continuation of Blood In, Blood Out but rather "a lot of records put together, I think.", later describing it as "heavy as shit, though — really fucking heavy." Writing for the album had continued by January 2018. Souza later went on to say that fans would have to wait until at least the end of 2019 for the release of new studio album, mainly due to Holt's commitment to Slayer's farewell tour. He then said that the new album would possibly be released in late 2019 or early 2020, promising that the album would be "very violent and very heavy".

In June 2020, Exodus announced that they would begin recording their follow-up to Blood In, Blood Out in September; pre-production of the album had begun a month earlier. In November 2020, it was announced the title of the album would be Persona Non Grata and was planned for release the following summer. In April 2021, very shortly after drummer Tom Hunting revealed that he had been diagnosed with cancer, Souza announced that the release of the album had been pushed back to November, though as reasons he cited both Hunting's illness and vinyl manufacturing issues due to the COVID-19 pandemic.

On August 20, 2021, Exodus announced that Persona Non Grata would be released on November 19, and its lead single "The Beatings Will Continue (Until Morale Improves)" was released on the same day through streaming services. On September 17, 2021, Exodus released the second single from Persona Non Grata, titled "Clickbait". On October 15, 2021, Exodus released the third single from Persona Non Grata, titled "The Years of Death and Dying". On November 19, 2021, the official release date of Persona Non Grata, Exodus released the album's fourth and final single, titled "Prescribing Horror".

Exodus supported Testament on The Bay Strikes Back tour in support of the album, the tour lasted from October 2021, to October 2023.

== Critical reception ==
Professional ratings
Review scores
Source	Rating
Blabbermouth.net	7/10
Ghost Cult Magazine	9/10
"Kerrang!"	3/5
Metal Hammer	3.5/5 stars
Metal.de	9/10
Metal Epidemic	5/5 stars
Metal Injection	9/10
Sonic Perspectives	9.0/10
Wall of Sound	Positive

Persona Non Grata has received highly positive reviews.

KJ Davern of Wall of Sound stated "Ultimately, Persona Non Grata has been worth the wait. There is all the good shit that you expect from Exodus and little filler. Andy Sneap has done an awesome job on the mix and the whole thing sounds contemporary, full blooded and undeniably sharp. What stands out most is just how hooky the album is, from the riffs to the choruses. Maybe the prolonged gestation has allowed the band to sift through riff tapes and hone their lyrics to the point that this album is a powerful statement that both celebrates their legacy and enhances it." Similarly Metal.de wrote "All in all, the long wait was worth it. "Persona Non Grata" is a relentless thrash powerhouse that sees EXODUS at the very top of their game. There is no filler, no let-up, and absolutely no boredom here." Metal Hammer noted "Despite some twists, Persona Non Grata is essentially Exodus savagery amplified for yet another new decade. After a lifetime of balls-out thrashing, that may not excite everyone. All the same, loyalists get a riff-addled return, hopefully kickstarting a more stable future for these maniacs."

Jeff Podshen of Metal Injection added "Persona Non Grata is, frankly, a lot more than I expected. This is a record that's angrier than an anti-masker on a Southwest flight. It's more vicious than Eagles fans chasing a guy with a Cowboys jersey on. While we know that Exodus can produce a gutsy and gallant thrash record with relative ease, I just wasn't expecting an LP with this much urgency and this much songcraft. It's at the next level for them. With that, Exodus gives us one of their very best records since the glorious 1980's. You won't be able to stop listening to it."

It was elected by Loudwire as the 23rd best rock/metal album of 2021. The publication also elected "The Beatings Will Continue (Until Morale Improves)" as the 11th best metal song of the same year. Decibel ranked it the 28th best album of 2021. The album also won a Metal Storm Award in the Best Thrash Metal Album category.

== Track listing ==
All lyrics and music written by Gary Holt except where noted.

Persona Non Grata track listing
No.	Title	Lyrics	Music	Length
1.	"Persona Non Grata"			7:30
2.	"R.E.M.F."			4:22
3.	"Slipping into Madness"	Steve "Zetro" Souza	Lee Altus	5:33
4.	"Elitist"	Souza		3:58
5.	"Prescribing Horror"			5:09
6.	"The Beatings Will Continue (Until Morale Improves)"			3:01
7.	"The Years of Death and Dying"	Tom Hunting		5:22
8.	"Clickbait"			4:31
9.	"Cosa Del Pantano"	instrumental		1:13
10.	"Lunatic-Liar-Lord"			7:59
11.	"The Fires of Division"			5:23
12.	"Antiseed"			6:17
Total length:				60:18

== Personnel ==
Personnel taken from Persona Non Grata CD booklet.

=== Exodus ===
- Steve "Zetro" Souza – lead vocals, backing vocals
- Gary Holt – guitars, backing vocals
- Lee Altus – guitars, backing vocals
- Jack Gibson – bass, backing vocals
- Tom Hunting – drums, backing vocals

=== Additional musicians ===
- Rick Hunolt – first guitar solo on "Lunatic-Liar-Lord", backing vocals
- Kragen Lum – third guitar solo on "Lunatic-Liar-Lord"
- Cody Souza – backing vocals
- Nick Souza – backing vocals

=== Technical personnel ===
- Exodus – production
- Andy Sneap – mixing, mastering
- Pär Olofsson – artwork
- Tayva Martinez – band photos
- Marcelo Vasco – layout

== Charts ==
Chart performance for Persona Non Grata
Chart (2021)	Peak position
Austrian Albums (Ö3 Austria)	33
German Albums (Offizielle Top 100)	24
Japanese Albums (Oricon)	44
Japanese Hot Albums (Billboard Japan)	45
Polish Albums (ZPAV)	43
Scottish Albums (Official Charts)	42
Swiss Albums (Schweizer Hitparade)	22
UK Album Downloads (Official Charts)	38
UK Independent Albums (Official Charts)	12
UK Rock & Metal Albums (Official Charts)	3
US Independent Albums (Billboard)	35
US Top Rock Albums (Billboard)	33
US Top Hard Rock Albums (Billboard)	9
