= Gary Holt (guitarist) =

American guitarist (born 1964)

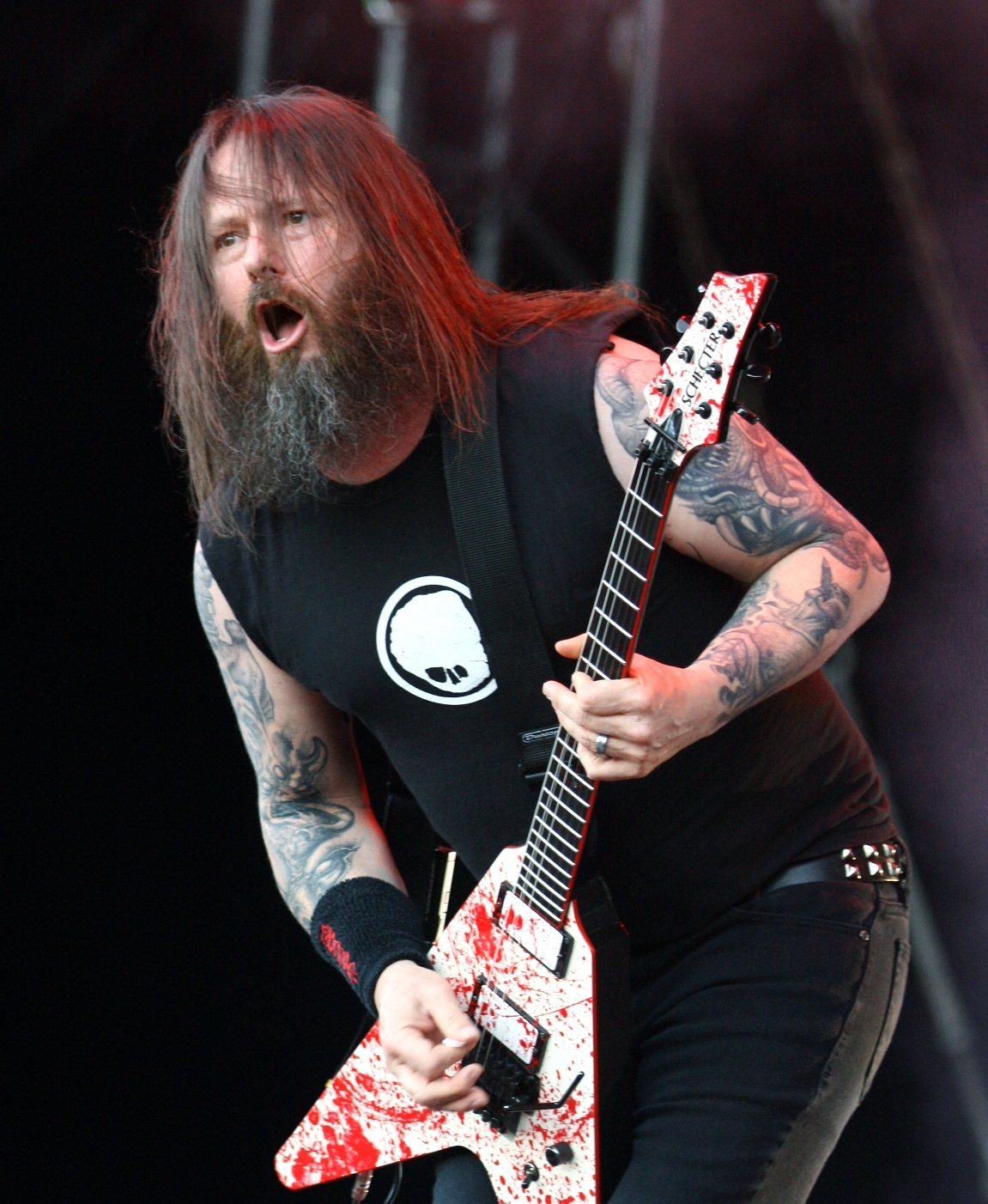
- Holt performing with Slayer in 2014

Background information
- Born: Gary Wayne Holt; May 4, 1964 (age 62); San Pablo, California, U.S.
- Genre: Thrash metal
- Occupations: Musician; songwriter
- Instrument: Guitar
- Years active: 1981–present
- Member of: Exodus; Slayer

Gary Wayne Holt (born May 4, 1964) is an American musician from the San Francisco Bay Area. He is the guitarist and main songwriter for thrash metal band Exodus, and has also been a member of Slayer since 2011, initially joining as a temporary guitarist in place of Jeff Hanneman, and as a permanent guitarist after his death in May 2013. Despite the fact that he did not join Exodus until 1981, Holt is the only member to appear on all of the band's albums.

Loudwire called Holt "arguably the best pure thrash guitarist".

== Career ==
Growing up, Holt was the youngest of six children. His older brothers were all into hard rock and introduced him to bands such as Black Sabbath, Montrose, Lynyrd Skynyrd, and Mahogany Rush. He later discovered bands such as Judas Priest, Iron Maiden, and the Scorpions.

=== Exodus ===
Holt began playing guitar at the age of 17, and just six months later after guitarist Tim Agnello left Exodus in 1981, he joined the band and has been the main songwriter and the most senior member of the group ever since. Following Kirk Hammett's 1983 departure from Exodus to join Metallica, Holt kept the band going and for many years, he and Rick Hunolt were referred to as the Exodus' "H-Team" guitar players. Holt is the only member of Exodus who has played on every album.

Holt has served as the bands main lyricist throughout the band’s tenure but sometimes shares duties with the bands vocalist Rob Dukes and Steve Souza.

=== Slayer ===
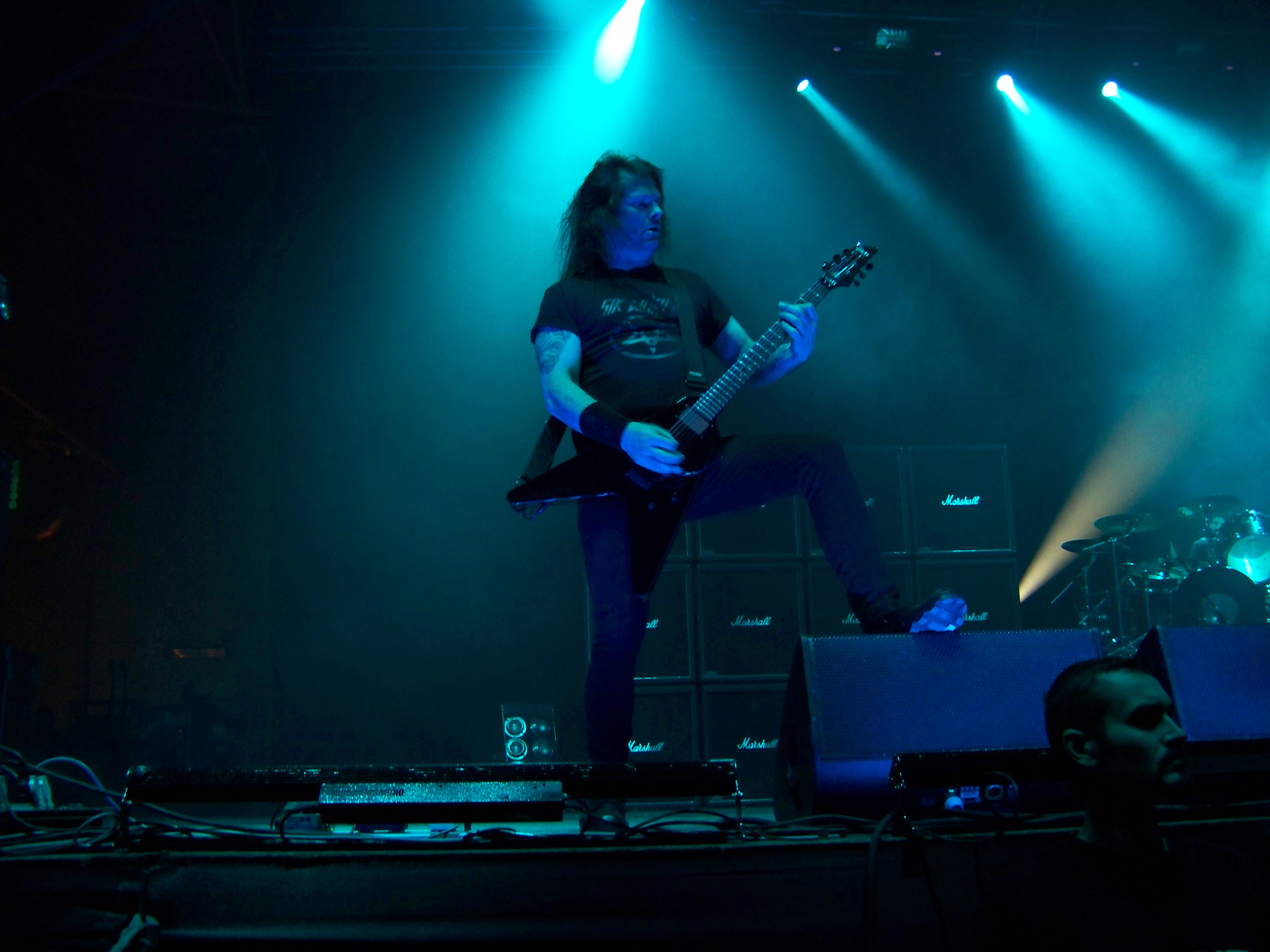
Holt performing with Slayer in Kyiv in March 2011. This was his first show in Europe with the band.

On February 12, 2011, it was announced that Holt would be temporarily filling in for Jeff Hanneman in the band Slayer. He was present for several of their tours that year, including the co-headlining European Carnage Tour with Megadeth. Holt also played with Slayer for the Big 4 concert (with Metallica, Megadeth and Anthrax) in Indio, California on April 23, 2011, as well as Fun Fun Fun Fest in Austin, Texas on November 6, 2011. Holt was later confirmed to be a permanent member of Slayer, following Hanneman's death on May 2, 2013, and stayed with the band until their split, following the conclusion of their 2018–2019 farewell tour. He also recorded guitar tracks on Slayer's 2015 album Repentless, but did not have any writing contributions on the album, except for guitar solos. Holt returned to Slayer in 2024, when the band began touring again.

=== Other work ===
In October 2008, Holt released an instructional guitar video called "A Lesson in Guitar Violence". He also produced Warbringer's second album, Waking into Nightmares. In 2019 he was included on "Cheapside Sloggers", a song on Volbeat's Rewind, Replay, Rebound.

In April 2025, Holt's memoir, A Fabulous Disaster, co-written with metal journalist, Adem Tepedelen, was published by Hachette Book Group imprint Da Capo Press. The book features a foreword by Metallica guitarist, and former Exodus bandmate, Kirk Hammett.

== Equipment ==
Holt endorses ESP Guitars as of September 2014 and has a signature version of the Eclipse model, ending his relationship with Schecter Guitar Research, where he previously had various signature models. He noted in an 2024, interview that he has a large collection of guitars, but ESP are his favorite. He has also used Ibanez, B.C. Rich, Jackson Guitars, Bernie Rico Jr., and Yamaha guitars. During Exodus early years he used a Hondo strat.

For amplification, he currently uses a Marshall Silver Jubilee in Slayer and an ENGL Savage 120 in Exodus as well as a Kemper Profiling amp. In the past, he has used a modified Marshall JCM800, Mesa Boogie Mark III, Marshall JVM, Peavey Triple XXX, and ENGL Savage 120. Before using the Silver Jubilee, DSL100H and Marshall JVM amps with Slayer, Holt made use of Jeff Hanneman's touring rack. Holt has a signature 4x12 speaker cabinet made by boutique American cabinet maker Arachnid Cabinets.

== Musical influences ==
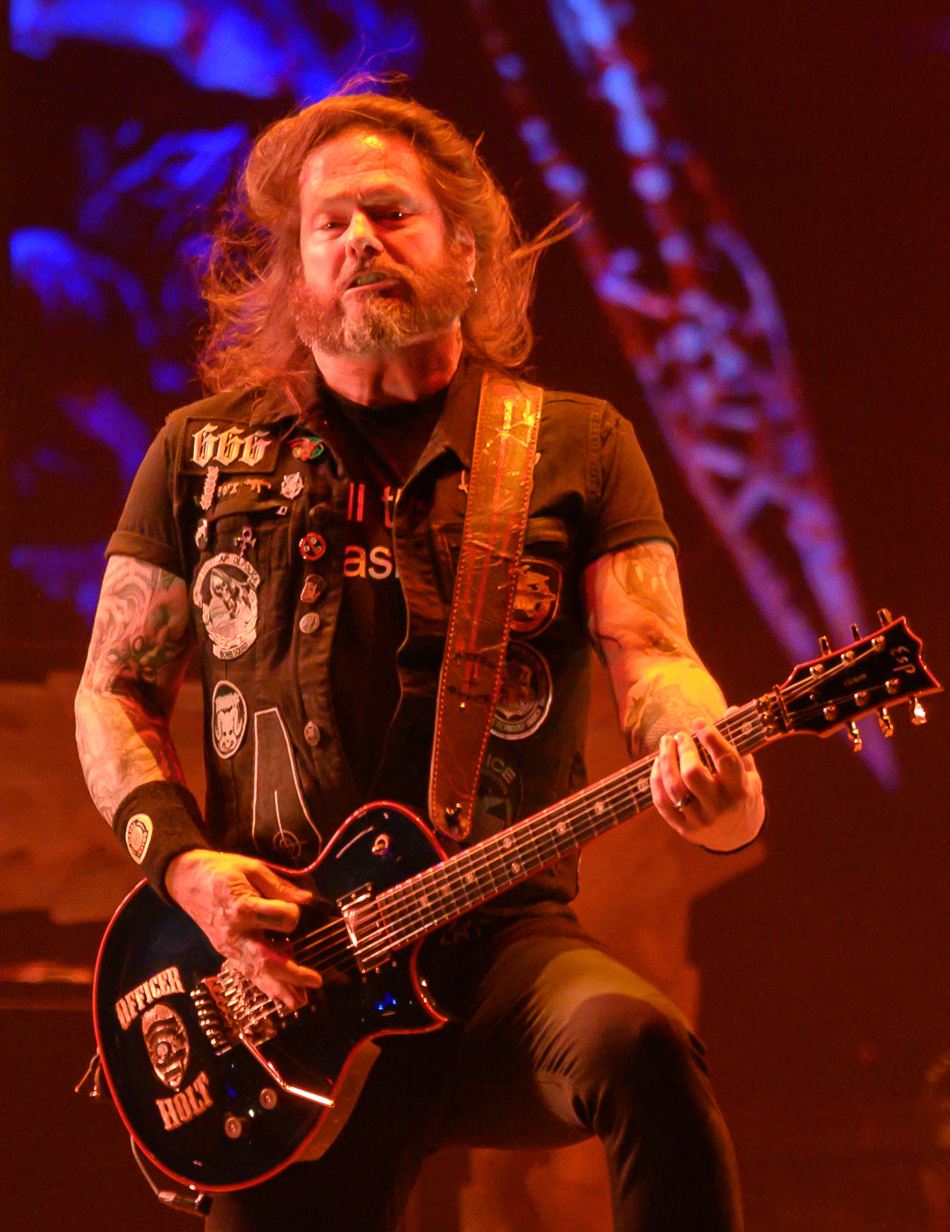
Holt performing in 2019

Holt's main guitar influences are Ritchie Blackmore, Michael Schenker, Angus Young, Tony Iommi, Uli Jon Roth, Matthias Jabs and Ted Nugent. His favorite bands include Venom, Motörhead, Thin Lizzy, Black Sabbath, early Iron Maiden and Judas Priest.

Holt picks with his right hand. He has noted that his playing style has evolved with age since he turned 60, he began suffering from arthritis and repetitive motion issues, so he adjusted his techniques accordingly.

Commenting on his song writing process Holt stated in a 2023, interview with Blabbermouth.net:

I'll have an idea of what I'm trying to achieve and no way at all of knowing how I'm going to. But if I want something that's super savage and riffy and pentatonic, I'll work around that framework until something cool happens. And sometimes it happens immediately. Sometimes a song will happen and be done in an hour. Sometimes, like the new one I'm working on right now, I've got about five days into it and I think I just nailed down the principal riff. Because I had 10 versions of it — 20. Like, which one's the right one? I don't know.

== Personal life ==
Outside of music, Holt enjoys foreign and period films and reality television.

Holt formerly resided in the Bay Area of San Francisco however in 2022, he reveled that he now lives in an isolated forest area of Northern California. He is married to his wife Lisa, he has three daughters and is a grandfather.

Holt is an atheist. In October 2017, he became a vegan. In 2021, he stopped drinking alcohol.

A certified ordained minister, Holt officiated Slayer bandmate Tom Araya’s vow renewal.

On December 17, 2018, his father Billie Charles Holt (born July 6, 1933) died.

According to Holt, the track "War Is My Shepherd" on the album Tempo of the Damned is a treatise of America's "pro-God" and "pro-war" stance and how he feels the two beliefs are incompatible with each other.

Holt endorsed Barack Obama in the 2008 presidential election, stating, "I used to have a lot of respect for McCain, but he realized after the dirty defeat that he suffered at the hands of George W. Bush in the South Carolina primary in the (2000) election that he can only get elected if he plays the Karl Rove tactic b.s. He's doing it. It's just one debunked lie after the other. He's the kind of guy who will tell you the sky is red, you look up and it's blue, and he won't admit he's wrong. He's playing dirty politics. Palin is just terrifying, the thought of this lady being a heart attack away from having the nuclear codes. She's crazy and she's dumb."

In the 2004 election, Holt vouched for John Kerry, but conceded that "they're all dirty crooks, all politicians. But at least (Kerry) wasn't a coward. He fought in the Vietnam War whereas George W. Bush Jr. was a draft dodger."

In 2017, he referred to President Donald Trump as a "serial liar" and an "embarrassment to this country, this world, and everyone living in it."

== Discography ==
Exodus

- 1982: 1982 Demo
- 1985: Bonded by Blood
- 1987: Pleasures of the Flesh
- 1989: Fabulous Disaster
- 1990: Impact Is Imminent
- 1991: Good Friendly Violent Fun
- 1992: Lessons in Violence
- 1992: Force of Habit
- 1997: Another Lesson in Violence
- 2004: Tempo of the Damned
- 2005: Shovel Headed Kill Machine
- 2007: The Atrocity Exhibition... Exhibit A
- 2008: Let There Be Blood
- 2008: Shovel Headed Tour Machine: Live at Wacken & Other Assorted Atrocities
- 2010: Exhibit B: The Human Condition
- 2014: Blood In, Blood Out
- 2021: Persona Non Grata
- 2026: Goliath

Slayer

- 2015: Repentless
- 2019: The Repentless Killogy

Asylum

- 1990: Asylum (Demo)

Destruction

- 2008: D.E.V.O.L.U.T.I.O.N.

Heathen

- 2009: The Evolution of Chaos

Hypocrisy

- 2005: Virus

Laughing Dead

- 1990: Demo 1990 (Demo)

Metal Allegiance

- 2015: Metal Allegiance [Gift of Pain]
- 2015: Metal Allegiance [We Rock]

Panic

- 1991: Epidemic

Under

- 1998: Under (EP)

Warbringer

- 2009: Waking into Nightmares

Witchery

- 2010: Witchkrieg
