= Bonded by Blood =

Studio album by Exodus
- Released: April 5, 1985
- Recorded: July 1984
- Studio: Prairie Sun (Cotati, California)
- Genre: Thrash metal
- Length: 40:49
- Label: Torrid/Combat
- Producer: Mark Whitaker

Exodus chronology
Bonded by Blood (1985)	Pleasures of the Flesh (1987)

Alternative cover

Bonded by Blood is the debut studio album by American thrash metal band Exodus. Although the album was completed in the summer of 1984, it was not released until 1985 due to issues with Exodus and the record label. It is considered one of the most influential thrash metal albums of all time. This is also the only full-length studio album of Exodus to feature Paul Baloff on vocals, though he was also on their 1982 Demo and appeared on their 1997 live album Another Lesson in Violence.

In 2008, Exodus re-recorded Bonded by Blood and re-released it as Let There Be Blood, featuring a new line-up of members aside from drummer Tom Hunting and guitarist Gary Holt who played on the original.

== Album information ==
Founding member Kirk Hammett left Exodus in April 1983 to replace Dave Mustaine in Metallica. Rick Hunolt was brought in as his replacement, while Rob McKillop replaced bassist Jeff Andrews. Within a week of Hammett's departure, guitarist Gary Holt had already written two songs for the album Bonded by Blood – "Strike of the Beast" and "No Love".

In March 1984, the band recorded a five-song demo, The Turk Street Tapes, with producer Doug Piercy. All five songs "Exodus," "A Lesson in Violence," "Strike of the Beast," "Bonded by Blood," and "And Then There Were None" would later appear on Bonded by Blood. By August 1984, the band had finished recording the entire album, which was recorded in two weeks. However, the album would not be released until nearly a year later. This was partly due to Torrid being a new label and there was an advance cassette copy of the album (with the original title A Lesson In Violence) widely distributed through the tape-trading network upon the record's completion late in the summer of 1984, creating an immense underground buzz prior to the official release of the LP.

The song "Impaler" was originally to be featured on Bonded by Blood, but it was abandoned when Kirk Hammett took the main riff with him to Metallica (it was used on "Trapped Under Ice"). The song eventually appeared on the 1997 live album Another Lesson in Violence, and then as a studio recording on the band's 2004 comeback album Tempo of the Damned with Steve "Zetro" Souza on vocals.

== Album cover ==
The album was originally titled A Lesson In Violence and the band had hired Tad Hunter to make the album cover which featured a lot of purples and crazy colors. However the band was not a fan of the artwork and this persuaded the band to change the album's name to Bonded by Blood and make new cover art. The new album cover art which Gary Holt came up with the idea for was an illustration of good and evil conjoined twin infants. For the 1989 reissue this cover was replaced with the band logo on a red and black image of a crowd. The album was remastered and re-issued by Century Media in 1999 in Europe only, with two live tracks from its Combat re-release in 1989, featuring Steve "Zetro" Souza on vocals. This reissue from Century Media restored the original twin cover artwork.

== Reception and legacy ==
Professional ratings
Review scores
Source	Rating
AllMusic	4/5 stars
Collector's Guide to Heavy Metal	8/10
Metal Forces	10/10
Metal.de	10/10

In a contemporary review, Bernard Doe of Metal Forces defined Bonded by Blood "a classic album in the thrash metal sense which is sure to be sneered at by the unconverted and mainstream media."

Bonded by Blood received a positive modern review from Eduardo Rivadavia of AllMusic, who states: "Had it been released immediately after it was recorded in 1984, Exodus' Bonded by Blood might be regarded today alongside Metallica's Kill 'Em All as one of the landmark albums responsible for launching the thrash metal wave" and adds that "Exodus were left to wonder what kind of impact they may have had without these setbacks." Rivadavia also described Bonded by Blood as "an album whose influence far exceeds its actual notoriety, and it remains a crucial piece of the thrash metal puzzle – essential." Canadian journalist Martin Popoff described Exodus as a band "doing what Metallica did best, and doing it with killer underground savagery", and considered Bonded by Blood "a solid, forward-thinking record". However, he observed that their "purist lack of compromise made [Exodus] somehow toneless and haranguing compared to multi-dimensional personalities like Metallica and Megadeth."

In 2008, the band re-recorded the entire album with vocalist Rob Dukes titled Let There Be Blood. This was due to Gary Holt wanting to re due both the guitars and drums on the original.

In 2003, Bonded by Blood was named one of "The Best 25 Heavy Metal Albums of All Time" in Sound of the Beast: The Complete Headbanging History of Heavy Metal, by Ian Christe.

In 2013, Bonded by Blood was ranked number 80 on Metal Rules' 'Top 100 Heavy Metal Albums'. In August 2014, Revolver placed the album on its "14 Thrash Albums You Need to Own" list, in 2022, they placed it on their 25 essential thrash metal album list. The album was ranked number one on Loudwire's top ten list of "Thrash Albums NOT Released by the Big 4". In 2023, the publication ranked it the 10th Greatest Thrash Metal Album of All Time. Metal Hammer ranked it the 6th Greatest Thrash Metal Album in 2022.

In 2017, Rolling Stone ranked Bonded by Blood as 45th on their list of "The 100 Greatest Metal Albums of All Time". In 2018, NME included it on their list of the 20 Best Metal Albums of the 1980s. In 2025, Consequence ranked it at 53rd on their list of the "75 Greatest Metal Albums of All Time".

Thrash metal revival act Bonded by Blood named themselves after the album.

The album remains popular among collectors of physical media.

== Track listing ==
All music is composed by Gary Holt, unless noted otherwise.

Side one
No.	Title	Lyrics	Music	Length
1.	"Bonded by Blood"	Holt; Paul Baloff		3:43
2.	"Exodus"	Baloff; Holt		4:05
3.	"And Then There Were None"	Holt; Tom Hunting		4:40
4.	"A Lesson in Violence"	Holt	Rick Hunolt; Holt	3:49
5.	"Metal Command"	Baloff; Holt; Mark Whitaker		4:13

Side two
No.	Title	Lyrics	Music	Length
6.	"Piranha"	Baloff		3:45
7.	"No Love"	Baloff		5:08
8.	"Deliver Us to Evil"	Holt; Whitaker	Holt; Hunolt	7:07
9.	"Strike of the Beast"	Holt; Baloff		3:57
Total length:				40:49

Re-issue edition bonus tracks
No.	Title	Lyrics	Music	Length
10.	"And Then There Were None" (live)	Holt; Hunting		4:52
11.	"A Lesson in Violence" (live)	Holt	Holt; Hunolt	3:26
Total length:				49:07

== Personnel ==
Writing, performance and production credits are adapted from the album liner notes.

=== Exodus ===
- Paul Baloff – vocals
- Gary Holt – guitars
- Rick Hunolt – guitars
- Rob McKillop – bass
- Tom Hunting – drums

=== Additional personnel ===
- Satan's Choir – backing vocals

=== Production ===
- Ken Adams – executive production
- Todd Gordon – executive production
- Mark Whitaker – production, assistant engineering, mixing
- John Volaitis – engineering
- Robin Yeager – mixing at Tres Virgos Studios, San Rafael, California August 1984
- Gordon Lyons "The Triple Threat" – assistant mixing
- George Horn – mixing, mastering at Fantasy Studios, Berkeley, California

=== Artwork and design ===
- Donald J. Munz – cover art, layout
- Richard A. Ferraro – cover painting
