= Steve Souza =

American metal vocalist (born 1964)

Steve "Zetro" Souza
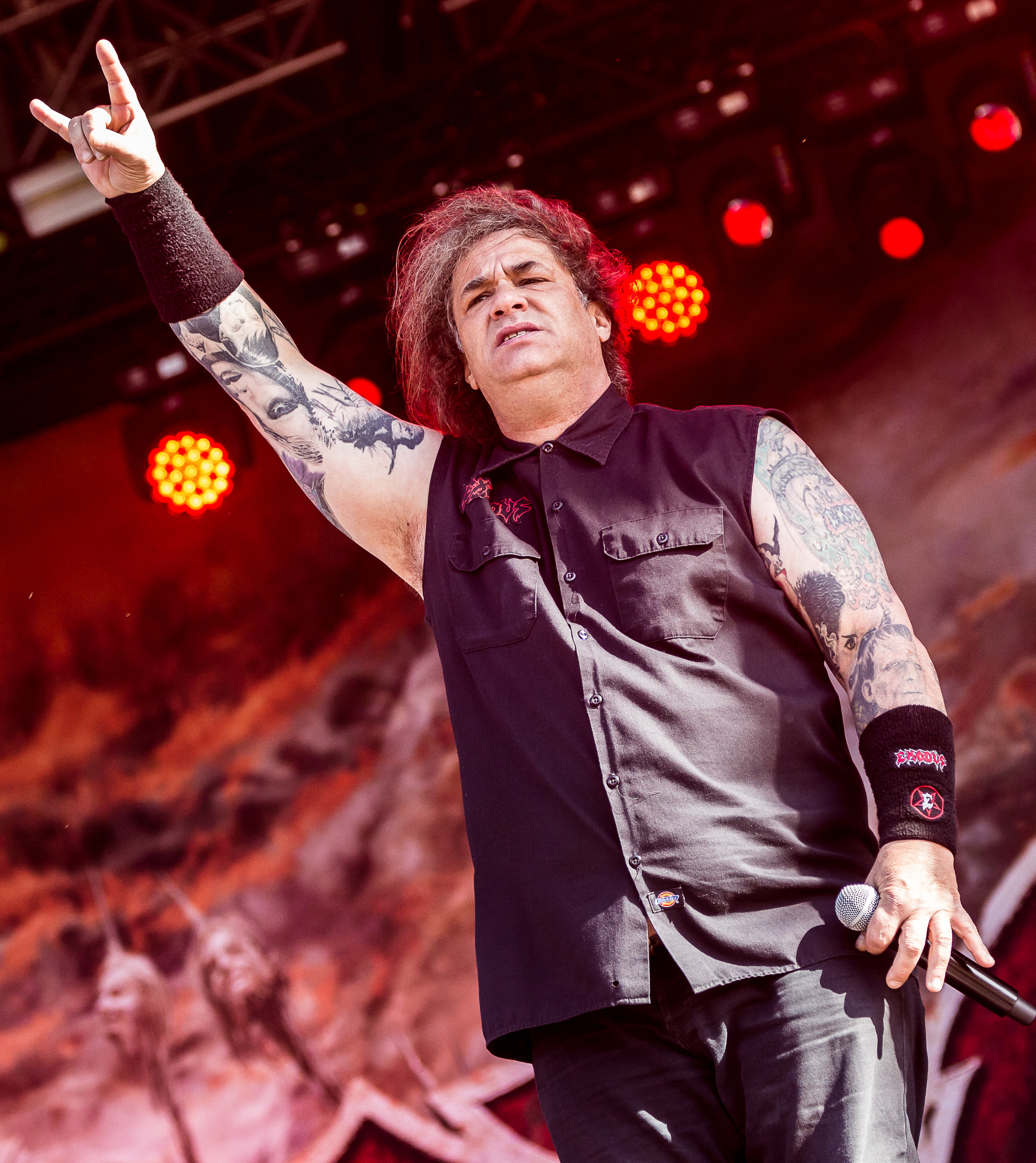
- Souza with Exodus in 2018

Background information
- Born: March 24, 1964 (age 62); Dublin, California, U.S.
- Genre: Thrash metal
- Occupation: Singer
- Years active: 1982–present
- Member of: Dublin Death Patrol
- Formerly of: Exodus; Hatriot; Tenet; Legacy

Steve "Zetro" Souza (born March 24, 1964) is an American musician, best known for his work as a former lead vocalist with thrash metal band Exodus from 1986 to 1994, 2002 to 2004, and 2014 to 2025. He is also one of two singers, along with Chuck Billy, for the band Dublin Death Patrol, and was the lead singer for the thrash metal band Legacy before they became known as Testament. In 2011, Souza announced his new project, Hatriot. He stepped down as the frontman of the band in 2015, leaving the role of lead vocals to his son, Cody.

== Career ==
=== Legacy/Testament ===
Before singing for Exodus, he was the lead singer for the band Legacy (which became Testament after his departure), recording and writing most of the Legacy Demo in 1985. At the time of his departure from Legacy, he introduced Chuck Billy to Legacy members and joined Exodus. In 1987, Souza was given writing credits on Testament's debut album The Legacy, since many of the songs were conceived during his time in the band. He eventually made guest appearances on two Testament albums (2001's First Strike Still Deadly and 2008's The Formation of Damnation). He also received writing credits on three additional Testament albums: 2012's Dark Roots of Earth, 2020's Titans of Creation, and 2025's Para Bellum.

Prior to joining Legacy he was in another band with future Machine Head guitarist Phil Demmel.

=== Exodus ===
Souza is best known for his stints in Exodus, for whom he sang between 1986 and 1994 (when they broke up) after being brought in to replace Paul Baloff. Exodus was disbanded about two years after the release of Force of Habit. He later rejoined the reformed Exodus from 2002 to 2004. He again parted ways with the band during their South American tour later in 2004; according to Holt, Zetro bailed from the tour just as the tour was about to start. This caused the split to be fairly hostile; in retrospect, Zetro has admitted the blame for the circumstances, saying that it was his discontent at the time that caused the problems.

=== Thrash Against Cancer ===
Souza hosted the Thrash Against Cancer benefit in 2005 at The Pound in San Francisco, and appears onstage with Testament every time they play the Bay Area.

=== Dublin Death Patrol ===
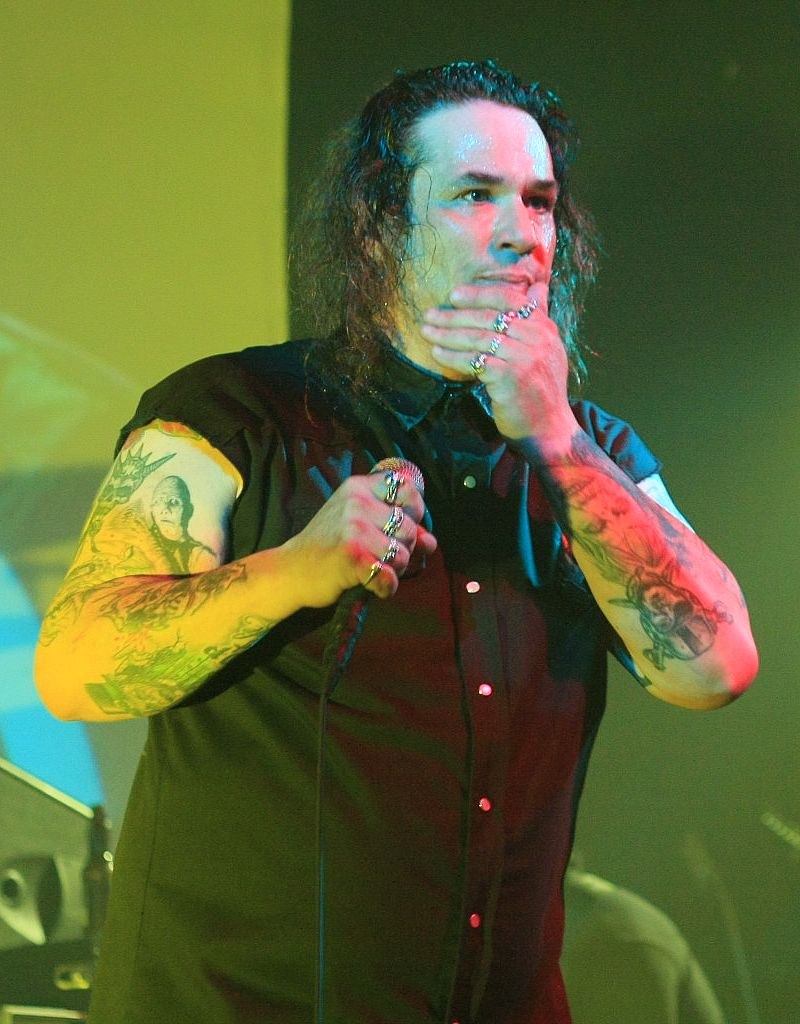
Souza on stage with Dublin Death Patrol, 2011

In 2006, he, his brother and Chuck Billy formed Dublin Death Patrol, an American thrash metal band. Alongside Willy Lange (Lȧȧz Rockit). In 2007, they went on a world tour and did Fields of Rock in the Netherlands alongside Heaven & Hell, Korn, Iron Maiden, Ozzy Osbourne, Machine Head, Black Label Society, Hatebreed, Megadeth, Papa Roach, Slayer, Motörhead, Mastodon, Velvet Revolver, Dream Theater, Suicidal Tendencies, Amon Amarth, DragonForce, Ill Niño, and DevilDriver.

He released to albums with the band the most recent being Death Sentence (2012).

=== Tenet ===
In August 2008, Souza became the lead singer for the metal band TENET along with members Byron Stroud (Strapping Young Lad, Fear Factory, Zimmer's Hole), Jed Simon (Strapping Young Lad, Zimmer's Hole), Glen Alvelais (Testament, Forbidden) and Gene Hoglan (Death, Unearth, Dethklok, Strapping Young Lad, Dark Angel, Testament, Zimmer's Hole, Old Man's Child). The album was eventually released in July 2009.

=== Hatriot ===
Souza, along with fellow members Kosta Varvatakis, Justin Sakagawa, and his two sons Nicholas Souza and Cody Souza, started a thrash metal project called Hatriot. Hatriot released their debut album, Heroes of Origin, on January 25, 2013. The group's second album, Dawn of the New Centurion, was released on February 21, 2014 via Massacre Records. Steve eventually left Hatriot due to Exodus touring duties in 2015 and was succeeded by his son Cody.

=== Return to Exodus (2014–2025) ===
On June 8, 2014, it was announced that Souza had rejoined Exodus. He appeared on Exodus' tenth studio album Blood In, Blood Out, which is his first album with the band since 2004's Tempo of the Damned, he also appeared on the 2021 album Persona Non Grata.

=== Exodus third departure (2025–present) ===
In January 2025, Exodus announced that they had once again parted ways with Souza and that they would be replacing him with former vocalist, Rob Dukes. Souza revealed that he was "let go" from the band, which was later confirmed by Exodus themselves. Guitarist Gary Holt compared Zetro's departure to a marriage that was over, and on his Toxic Vault webcast, Zetro agreed, saying "it was probably the right thing for me, and I hope it's the right thing for them as well."

Since September 2025, Souza has begun touring with his solo band where he performs Exodus deep cuts along with songs off the Legacy demo from 1985. In May 2026, he featured on the song "Bulletts Ready" by the supergroup Kings of Thrash.

== Style ==
Souza's voice is reminiscent of AC/DC's former vocalist Bon Scott, and can be heard on the AC/DC covers that Exodus recorded, including "Overdose" on 1989's Fabulous Disaster, and "Dirty Deeds Done Dirt Cheap" on 2004's Tempo of the Damned. On November 1, 2024, Exodus' cover of AC/DC's "Beating Around the Bush" was released. In 2022, Souza confirmed that his vocal style is an imitation of Scott’s and that Scott inspired him to become a singer. He has also noted other acts such as UFO, Black Sabbath, and Ted Nugent as influences during his early years.

During his time with Legacy Souza wrote a majority of the band’s lyrics. However while in Exodus he would split the lyric writing with guitarist Gary Holt, when he started Hatriot he returned to being the main writer.

== Personal life ==
Souza is second generation Portuguese American. His grandparents were originally from the Azores islands in Portugal before settling in California in the early 20th century. Souza has two sons Nick and Cody who are also musicians playing guitar and bass respectively.

In June 2012, Souza disclosed that the nickname "Zetro" comes from a cartoon whale he saw in high school. However in June 2019, Souza revealed that initially the name began as 'Zet,' which came from a random word that he had uttered throughout the entirety of an LSD trip in 1979, which friends gave him as a nickname afterwards. This remained his nickname until around 1982. While roadie-ing for a local band, a fellow roadie called him 'Zetro' instead and the name has stuck ever since.

In a July 2018 interview, Souza called himself a supporter of President Donald Trump, as he cites the low unemployment rate and the meetings with North Korean leader Kim Jong-un being beneficial to the country. Regarding Kim, Zetro mentioned: "I think that's great – that's what you need to do. People need to touch together, not do it through channels".

== Discography ==
=== With Testament ===
- Legacy Demo (1985)
- First Strike Still Deadly (2001) (Note: Credited for writing six out of eleven songs, and as a guest musician provided lead vocals on two songs.)
- The Formation of Damnation (2008) (Note: Credited for writing six out of eleven songs, and as a guest musician provided backing vocals on an unspecified number of songs.)

=== With Exodus ===
- Pleasures of the Flesh (1987)
- Fabulous Disaster (1989)
- Impact Is Imminent (1990)
- Good Friendly Violent Fun (1991)
- Force of Habit (1992)
- Tempo of the Damned (2004)
- Blood In, Blood Out (2014)
- Persona Non Grata (2021)

=== With Dublin Death Patrol ===
- DDP 4 Life (2007)
- Death Sentence (2012)

=== With Tenet ===
- Sovereign (2009)

=== With Hatriot ===
- Heroes of Origin (2013)
- Dawn of the New Centurion (2014)
