= The Original Monster Mash =

Studio album by Bobby (Boris) Pickett and The Crypt-Kickers
- Released: 1962
- Recorded: 1962
- Genres: Novelty, Halloween
- Length: 39:45
- Label: Garpax
- Producer: Gary S. Paxton

The Original Monster Mash is the only studio album by Bobby (Boris) Pickett and The Crypt-Kickers. It was recorded and released in late 1962, following the success of Pickett's "Monster Mash" single. The Crypt-Kickers included Leon Russell and Gary Paxton. In addition to the hit single, the album features spin-off songs of "Monster Mash" as well as horror-themed parodies of contemporary hits and dance trends.

The album's somewhat unwieldy title arose from the need to distinguish it in the marketplace from an album by John Zacherle on the rival Cameo-Parkway label, titled Monster Mash and featuring Zacherle's cover version of the song.

== Track listing ==
1. "Monster Mash" (Leonard Capizzi, Bobby "Boris" Pickett) – 3:14
2. "Rabian - The Fiendage Idol" (Johnny MacRae, Pickett) – 2:54
3. "Blood Bank Blues" (Capizzi, Pickett) – 2:47
4. "Graveyard Shift" (MacRae, Gary S. "Flip" Paxton, Pickett, Charles Underwood) – 2:09
5. "Skully Gully" (Capizzi, Pickett) – 2:01
6. "Wolfbane" (MacRae, Pickett) – 3:24
7. "Monster Minuet" (MacRae, Paxton, Pickett, Gary Owens) – 1:52
8. "Transylvania Twist" (MacRae, Paxton, Pickett) – 1:36
9. "Sinister Stomp" (Capizzi, Pickett) – 2:19
10. "Me & My Mummy" (MacRae, Pickett) – 2:42
11. "Monster Motion" (MacRae) – 2:34
12. "Monster Mash Party" (Paxton) – 2:53
13. "Irresistible Igor" (Capizzi, Pickett) – 2:29
14. "Bella's Bash" (MacRae, Pickett) – 2:49
15. "Let's Fly Away" (Paxton, Pickett) – 0:50
16. "Monsters' Holiday" (Underwood) - 3:10

== Charts ==
Chart performance for The Original Monster Mash
Chart (2026)	Peak position
Canadian Albums (Billboard)	71
US Billboard 200	97
