= Law and Order (album) =

Studio album by Lindsey Buckingham
- Released: October 2, 1981
- Recorded: February 1981 – August 1981
- Studios: Larrabee (West Hollywood); Wally Heider (Los Angeles)
- Genres: Rock; avant-pop
- Length: 36:13
- Labels: Asylum (US/Canada); Mercury (outside US/Canada); Warner Bros. (reissue)
- Producers: Lindsey Buckingham; Richard Dashut

Lindsey Buckingham chronology
Law and Order (1981)	Go Insane (1984)

Singles from Law and Order
- 1. "Trouble" Released: October 1981; 2. "It Was I" Released: March 1982; 3. "The Visitor (Bwana)" Released: March 1982 (UK); 4. "Mary Lee Jones" Released: May 1982 (UK)

Law and Order is the first solo album by Fleetwood Mac guitarist/vocalist/songwriter Lindsey Buckingham, released in 1981. The album's lead single "Trouble", featuring drumming by Fleetwood Mac bandmate Mick Fleetwood, reached No. 9 on the US chart; the album itself reached No. 32 on the Billboard 200. With the exception of "Trouble", Buckingham played all of the instruments on "Law and Order". Buckingham appeared on Saturday Night Live on February 6, 1982, and performed "Trouble" and "Bwana" with Mick Fleetwood's Zoo.

== Background ==
Following the release of Fleetwood Mac's Tusk album, where many of the tracks were recorded in Buckingham's home studio, Mick Fleetwood informed Buckingham that the band was not interested in recording subsequent releases in the same manner. This was the impetus for Buckingham to create Law and Order. "In that moment, I realized, 'If I wanna continue to take risks [and] try to define myself as an artist in the long term, I'm gonna have to start making solo albums.'" Buckingham explained that there was desire within Fleetwood Mac, particularly among himself and Stevie Nicks, to work on solo projects after the conclusion of the band's Tusk Tour.

When asked about the title of the album by Jim Ladd, Buckingham explained that it did not pertain to the contemporary context of the term, but was instead about establishing personal laws to abide by. "I think that in order to keep that sense of innocence, you really have to instill a sense of discipline in yourself and a sense of commitment, really. Commitment is a key word too. A sense of order about your life, if you will. And that's how the title came about."

In a 2018 interview with Stereogum, Buckingham described the album as a sarcastic body of work that was "almost verging on a comedy album". He further explained that "Law And Order doesn't speak in a sincere way. It speaks more in an ironic way, a tongue in cheek way."

== Recording ==
Around October 1980, Buckingham acquired a recording console that he described as "inexpensive". He also used the same 24-track machine that Fleetwood Mac used at the Village Recorder for their Tusk album. Buckingham then took the equipment to a room in Burbank, California, where he commenced with the recording sessions. Work on Law and Order began in February 1981 at Larrabee Sound Studios.

Buckingham temporarily put his solo album on hold once Fleetwood Mac began their initial Mirage recording sessions. Buckingham resumed progress in June and spent the next few months making final adjustments to Law and Order through August. During the second half of the recording sessions, Richard Dashut became involved as an audio engineer. Buckingham also began to add keyboards to some of the songs, which included an acoustic piano and a Casiotone, which was the only electronic keyboard used on the album.

Since Buckingham recorded most of the instruments on Law and Order himself, he was required to record each instrument individually as an overdub. Buckingham started each song with the drums, after which he would build the arrangement around that instrument. He wanted the drums to be slightly behind the beat with a "hesitated feel" in a similar way to Mick Fleetwood and Charlie Watt's approach to the instrument, so he recorded the drums through a click track that was delayed by roughly 30-40 milliseconds, after which he would record the remaining instruments to a non-delayed click track so that they would be slightly ahead of the drums. Buckingham said that this technique resulted in some "tension" in the tracks and believed that the drums on Law and Order were more an improvement over some of the drums that he recorded on Tusk.

== Songs ==
Law and Order opens with "Bwana", which Sam Sutherland of Billboard described as having a "sinister" lyric and a "delightfully crooned lead vocal". Buckingham intended for "Bwana" to evoke music from the 1940s and 50s and elicit the imagery of a "jungle cartoonland". The lead vocals were recorded after the completion of the basic instrumental track and the backing vocals. Right before he was set to sing the lead vocals, Buckingham changed the melody and lyrics after Dashut suggested he sing "Bwana" in the style of Frankie Lymon.

Buckingham initially made an attempt at playing the drums on "Trouble", but was dissatisfied with the results, so he asked Fleetwood to record the drums instead. After the recording session with Fleetwood, Buckingham arrived at the conclusion that none of Fleetwood's parts were satisfactory from start to finish, so he took a four-second section of Fleetwood's drums and looped it throughout the duration of the song. Buckingham then overdubbed drum fills and cymbal crashes to give "Trouble" more of a live feel. George Hawkins, who had worked on Fleetwood's 1981 solo album The Visitor, played the bass on "Trouble". Buckingham did not write "Mary Lee Jones" about anybody specific, although Carol Ann Harris, his girlfriend at the time, had told him that she saw similarities with herself and the title character. With the exception of the solo, which Buckingham described as "fairly unusual", he felt that the song was otherwise "pretty straight ahead".

"I'll Tell You Now" is the oldest song on the album; Buckingham posited that it would have been included on Fleetwood Mac's Tusk album had the song been written a few months earlier. "I'll Tell You Now" includes an acoustic arrangement with falsetto backing vocals. The lyrics center around a promise to divulge the reasons for his melancholy, which he never fulfills. The song's fadeout concludes with sobbing noises from Buckingham underpinned by his acoustic guitar.

"It Was I" is a cover of a 1959 single originally recorded by Skip & Flip. Buckingham had heard the song several years prior to the recording of Law and Order and wanted his version to have an "amateurish" quality. He asked Harris, who had no prior experience as a professional vocalist, to contribute some vocals on "It Was I". She initially had reservations about contributing over her belief that she would be unable to properly execute the part and asked Buckingham to find another person to cover the duet vocals with him instead. After Buckingham explained that he wanted her to have some involvement on his first solo album, Harris agreed to participate.

Buckingham wrote "Love From Here, Love From There" with the idea of emulating a New Orleans woodwind and brass ensemble with guitars. To achieve this, Buckingham played a slide guitar to imitate the sound of a trombone, a Fender Statocaster for the clarinet, and a Gretsch guitar for the trumpet. The final song on the album is a cover of "A Satisfied Mind", which Buckingham said was one of his dad's favorite songs. Buckingham based his arrangement on the 1955 rendition recorded by Red and Betty Foley, which was the version he was most familiar with.

== Critical reception ==
Professional ratings
Review scores
Source	Rating
AllMusic	3.5/5 stars
Record Mirror	1/5 stars
Robert Christgau	B+
Rolling Stone	4/5 stars

Law and Order received mixed to mostly positive reviews from music critics. Record World said that Law and Order was "quite a collection; some of it is lovely, some of it is quirky, and about all of it is appealing." They concluded by saying that "if anyone still wonders who was mainly responsible for making Fleetwood Mac's Tusk so marked and bold a break with the Rumours tradition, Law and Order will lay all doubts to rest." Cashbox declared that Law and Order revealed Buckingham to be "one of rock's major loons." They noted the incorporation of "African and oriental rhythms and a lot of the Beatles and Bonzo Dog Band idosyncrasies" and thought that the album "still manages to stay commercial."

Billboard said that the album balanced Buckingham's "elegant guitars work and deft melodic sense against a newer element of rhythmic playfulness and a more urgent vocal attack." Sam Sutherland of Billboard also thought that Law and Order did not exclusively serve as a vehicle to showcase Buckingham's guitar and vocal abilities, saying that Buckingham was "at least as concerned with the overall scheme of an arrangement as he is with his own solos or fills." He highlighted "I'll Tell You Now" as the album's "real sleeper", with "one of the more cryptic sets of verses in recent pop", adding that the "charm" of "Trouble" was "almost commonplace" compared to "I'll Tell You Now".

Jon Pareles of Rolling Stone, in a 4/5 star review, wrote that "based on the evidence of Law and Order... Lindsey Buckingham's biggest contribution to Fleetwood Mac has been his unabashed fondness for pop music at its most hokey and hooky." Robin Smith of Record Mirror panned the "miserable" album in a 1/5 star review, saying that it "sounds like the out takes of Mac's worst studio sessions delivered around [Buckingham's] reedy little voice."

In a retrospective review, William Ruhlmann of AllMusic gave the album 3.5/5 stars, saying that it "comes off as a high-quality demo of largely unfinished material". He felt that the album contained some decent ideas that were held back by the lyrics, which he believed were treated as an afterthought. Gary Graff listed Law and Order as one of the 501 most essential albums of the 1980s, writing that it "offered much of the same skewed, avant pop approach" as Tusk and that its presentation of material resembling "almost-unfinished demos" was "all part of the charm".

== Music promo videos ==
Two promotional music videos were shot for Law and Order, "Trouble" and "It Was I", both directed by Jerry Watson in Los Angeles. "Trouble" featured friends of Buckingham playing either guitar or drums. They included Mick Fleetwood, Bob Welch, and Bob Weston from Fleetwood Mac and singer-songwriter Walter Egan.

== Track listing ==
All tracks are written by Lindsey Buckingham, except where indicated.

Law and Order track listing
No.	Title	Writer(s)	Length
1.	"Bwana"		3:08
2.	"Trouble"		3:56
3.	"Mary Lee Jones"		3:15
4.	"I'll Tell You Now"		4:21
5.	"It Was I"	Gary Paxton	2:39
6.	"September Song"	Maxwell Anderson, Kurt Weill	3:17
7.	"Shadow of the West"		3:59
8.	"That's How We Do It in L.A."		2:53
9.	"Johnny Stew"		3:09
10.	"Love from Here, Love from There"		2:50
11.	"A Satisfied Mind"	Red Hayes, Jack Rhodes	2:49

== Personnel ==
Main performer

- Lindsey Buckingham – vocals, guitars, bass, keyboards, drums, percussion

Additional personnel

- George Hawkins – bass on "Trouble"
- Mick Fleetwood – drums on "Trouble"
- Carol Ann Harris – harmony vocals on "It Was I"
- Christine McVie – harmony vocals on "Shadow of the West"

Production

- Lindsey Buckingham – producer, recording, Polaroid art
- Richard Dashut – producer, recording
- David Brown – recording
- Sabrina Buchanek – recording assistant
- Judy Clapp – recording assistant
- Dennis Mays – recording assistant
- Larry Emerine – mastering
- Stephen Marcussen – mastering
- Precision Lacquer (Hollywood, California) – mastering location
- Larry Vigon – art direction, design
- George Hurrell – front cover photography
- Sam Emerson – back cover photography

== Charts ==
Chart performance for Law and Order
Chart (1981)	Peak position
Canada Top Albums/CDs (RPM)	27
New Zealand Albums (RMNZ)	28
US Billboard 200	32
US Cash Box Top 200 Albums	34

== Certifications ==
Certifications for Law and Order
Region	Certification	Certified units/sales
Australia (ARIA)	Gold	20,000^{^}
^{^} Shipments figures based on certification alone.
