= Twist with Steve Alaimo =

Studio album by Steve Alaimo
- Released: 1961
- Genre: Pop
- Label: Checker
- Producer: Leonard Chess

Steve Alaimo chronology
Twist with Steve Alaimo (1961)	Mashed Potatoes (1962)

Twist with Steve Alaimo is a studio album recorded by Steve Alaimo and released in 1961. The name of the album and several of the songs capitalize on the dance craze of the Twist although others are covers of songs previously made popular by other artists.

== Track listing ==
=== Side 1 ===
1. "The Twist" (Hank Ballard)
2. "Let's Go, Let's Go, Let's Go" (Hank Ballard)
3. "Good Good Lovin'" (Harold Brown, Albert Shubert)
4. "I've Got It!" (Steve Alaimo, Maynard)
5. "Do the Mashed Potatoes" (Dessie Rozier)
6. "Lucille" (Richard Wayne Penniman)

=== Side 2 ===
1. "Boppin' the Blues" (Carl Perkins, Curly Griffin)
2. "The Hoochie Coochie Coo" (Hank Ballard, Billie Myles)
3. "Let's Twist Again" (Kal Mann, Dave Appell)
4. "Do the Hully Gully" (Steve Alaimo, Jesse Stone)
5. "This Little Girl's Gone Rockin'" (Bobby Darin, Mann Curtis)
6. "Twist All Night" (Steve Alaimo, Jesse Stone)
