= Danté and The Evergreens =

Danté and The Evergreens were an American pop group formed at Santa Monica College in California in 1959.

Dante & the Evergreens came to the attention of Dean Torrence (Jan & Dean), who took them to his managers, Herb Alpert and Lou Adler. The group's vocals were arranged by Tony Moon. The group hit the U.S. pop chart in 1960 with the song "Alley Oop", written by Dallas Frazier. Their version of the tune hit No. 15 on the Billboard Hot 100 and went No. 1 on Cashbox; while The Hollywood Argyles' version went to No. 1 on the Billboard chart, the Evergreens recording was a bigger hit on the East Coast. A follow-up single, "Time Machine", hit No. 73 on the Billboard Hot 100.

All of its members were white, and the group became one of the first all-white vocal groups to play at high-profile venues for black music such as the New York Apollo Theatre, the Philadelphia Uptown Theater. However, further chart success eluded them, and the group disbanded in 1961. Rosenthal eventually returned to college, and Bill Young sought a career as a solo artist and actor. Donald Drowty — the group's "Dante" — later recorded as Dante and His Friends, and wrote and produced for Mellin Music Publishing. Among his credits are recordings by The Isley Brothers, The McCoys, and Herb Alpert. Tony Moon, after the break-up of the group in 1961, moved to Nashville and became the guitar player and conductor for Brenda Lee for several years. After leaving the road he became a successful publisher, opening the Nashville office of Screen gems-Columbia Music. He also was a successful songwriter (several awards), and one of only two writers in Nashville to have a song released by The Beatles (Live At The BBC, Soldier of Love (Lay Down Your Arms)) and Pearl Jam. He also produced three chart singles by The Vogues ("5 O'Clock World"). He later formed Crescent Moon Talent. He lives in Sarasota, Florida, having previously lived in Franklin, Tennessee.

== Members ==
- Donald "Dante" Drowty (born October 5, 1938)
- Frank Rosenthal (born November 12, 1941)
- Bill Young (March 27, 1940 – September 20, 2015)
- Tony Moon (born 1938)
