= The Long Haul =

The long haul, A long haul, long haul, or longhaul may refer to:

== Films ==
- The Long Haul (1957 film), a British film starring Victor Mature and Diana Dors
- The Long Haul, a 1960 film featuring the town of Sintaluta, Saskatchewan
- The Long Haul (1988 film), a Brazilian film
- The Long Haul (2026 film), an upcoming road drama film
- A Long Haul, 2010 documentary film directed by Nathaniel Kramer
- Diary of a Wimpy Kid: The Long Haul (film), the fourth Diary of a Wimpy Kid film, released 2017

== Literature ==
- The Long Haul (novel), 1938 by A. I. Bezzerides
- The Long Haul (autobiography), 1999 by Myles Horton
- The Long Haul, 2003 by Amanda Stern
- The Long Haul (comic book), 2005 by Antony Johnston and Eduardo Barreto
- Diary of a Wimpy Kid: The Long Haul, a 2014 children's novel by Jeff Kinney

== Other uses ==
- Longhaul Records, recording label of Sum of Parts and other albums
- Long Haul (Transformers), multiple characters in the Transformers robot superhero franchise.
- Long-haul, flights with a flight length generally longer than 2,200 nmi (4,100 km)
- LongHaul, a power saving technology developed by VIA Technologies

== See also ==
- Long-hauler, sufferer of long COVID, long-term effects following COVID-19 disease
