= Mashed Potatoes (Steve Alaimo album) =

Studio album by Steve Alaimo
- Released: 1962
- Genre: Pop
- Label: Checker

Steve Alaimo chronology
| Twist with Steve Alaimo (1961) | Mashed Potatoes (1962) | Every Day I Have to Cry (1963) |

Mashed Potatoes is Steve Alaimo's second album for Checker Records. Like his previous album, it capitalizes on a dance craze, only this time, the Mashed Potato.

== Track listing ==
=== Side 1 ===
1. "Mashed Potatoes, Part 1"
2. "Ooh Poo-Pah-Doo" (Jessie Hill)
3. "She's My Baby"
4. "I Like It Like That"
5. "Peanut Butter"
6. "You're So Fine"

=== Side 2 ===
1. "Mashed Potatoes, Part 2"
2. "Ya-Ya"
3. "Hully Gully With Me"
4. "Heart Break"
5. "Baby What You Want Me to Do"
6. "I Got a Woman"
