= Anthology (disambiguation) =

An anthology is a collection of literary works.

Anthology or anthologies may also refer to:

- Anthology film, a feature film consisting of several different short films
- Anthology series, a radio, television, film, or video game series that spans different genres and presents a different story and characters in each different episode, season, segment, or short

== Albums ==
- Anthology (Alien Ant Farm album) (2001)
- Anthology (Anti-Nowhere League album) (1999)
- Anthology (Anvil album) (2000)
- Anthology (Asia album) (1997)
- Anthology (Bad Manners album) (2001)
- Anthology (Belinda Carlisle album) (2014)
- Anthology (Ben E. King album) (1993)
- Anthology (Bic Runga album) (2012)
- Anthology (Bruce Dickinson video) (2006)
- Anthology (Bryan Adams album) (2005)
- Anthology (Cameo album) (2002)
- Anthology (Can album) (1994)
- Anthology (Carly Simon album) (2002)
- Anthology (Christie Front Drive album) (1995)
- Anthology (Chuck Berry album) (2000)
- Anthology (Colosseum album) (2000)
- Anthology (Ensemble Renaissance album) (1997)
- Anthology (Generation X compilation) (2003)
- Anthology (House of Lords album) (2008)
- Anthology (Juice Newton album) (1998)
- Anthology (Kate Ceberano album) (2016)
- Anthology (Manowar album) (1997)
- Anthology (Michael Jackson album) (1986)
- Anthology (New Grass Revival album) (1990)
- Anthology (Obituary album) (2001)
- Anthology (Oingo Boingo album) (1999)
- Anthology (Patrice Rushen album) (1985)
- Anthology (Quarashi album) (2011)
- Anthology (Rough Cutt album) (2008)
- Anthology (Sammy Hagar album) (1994)
- Anthology (Saxon album) (1988)
- Anthology (Selena album) (1998)
- Anthology (Stella Parton album) (1998)
- Anthology (Steve Alaimo album) (1997)
- Anthology (Steve Miller Band album) (1972)
- Anthology (The Temptations album) (1995, latest version)
- Anthology (The Babys album) (1981)
- Anthology (The Band album) (1978)
- Anthology (The Clean album) (2002)
- Anthology (The Jackson 5 album) (1976)
- Anthology (The Miracles album) (1974)
- Anthology (The Moody Blues album) (1998)
- Anthology (The Supremes album) (1974)
- Anthology (Thrice album) (2012)
- Anthology (UFO album) (1986)
- Anthology (Grover Washington Jr. album) (1981)
- Anthology (Pete Townshend album) (2005)
- Anthology (B-Sides & Unreleased), by AZ (2008)
- Anthology: 1999–2013, by Underoath (2012)
- Anthology: A Decade of Hits 1988–1998, by Dream Warriors (1999)
- Anthology: Down in Birdland, by The Manhattan Transfer (1992)
- Anthology: Marvin Gaye, by Marvin Gaye (1995)
- Anthology: SST Years 1985–1989 by Screaming Trees (1991)
- The Anthology (1947–1972), by Muddy Waters (2001)
- The Anthology (1968–1992), by Richard Pryor (2002)
- The Anthology (A Tribe Called Quest album) (1999)
- The Anthology (Bachman–Turner Overdrive album) (1993)
- The Anthology (Deep Purple album) (1985)
- The Anthology (James Reyne album) (2014)
- The Anthology (Joe Cocker album) (1999)
- The Anthology 1961–1977, by The Impressions and Curtis Mayfield (1992)
- The Anthology... So Far, by Ringo Starr (2001)
- The Beatles Anthology (1996)
- John Lennon Anthology (1998)
- Ray Charles Anthology (1988)
- Hey! Ho! Let's Go: The Anthology, by the Ramones (1999)
- Anthology, by Dan Reed Network (2014)
- Anthology, by Roger Daltrey (1998)
- Anthology of Bread, by Bread, known as The Sound of Bread (1977)
- Anthology: 1969-1976, by Jasper Wrath (1996)
- The Tortured Poets Department: The Anthology by Taylor Swift (2024)

== Other uses ==
- Anthologies (Magic: The Gathering), a card game compilation set
- Anthology (band), a metal band from Slovakia
- Anthology (music venue), a music venue and restaurant in San Diego, California
- Anthology Film Archives, a New York City film archive and theater specializing in avant-garde, experimental, and independent cinema
- Anthology, an Indian film series
