= The Toxic Waltz =

The Toxic Waltz may refer to:

- The Toxic Waltz tournament, a New England Championship Wrestling event
- The Toxic Waltz (song), a 1989 song by Exodus
