= Skip & Flip =

US musical duo

Skip & Flip was a U.S. pop duo, consisting of Skip (Clyde Battin) and Flip (Gary S. Paxton). They met while attending the University of Arizona in the late 1950s.

== Career ==
Once known as The Rockabillies, they recorded on Rev Records as The Pledges and then as Gary & Clyde. Time Records picked up their Rev Records master "Why Not Confess"/"Johnny Risk" and then moved them to its Brent Records label, under the name Skip and Flip. Their recording of Paxton's song "It Was I" entered the U.S. Top 20 in 1959, peaking at No. 11, and the follow-up, "Fancy Nancy", charted at No. 71. Their next release, a revival of Marvin & Johnny's R&B hit single, "Cherry Pie", also made No. 11 but proved to be the last chart entry they recorded together.

Paxton went on to record for several labels using several names, including The Hollywood Argyles, with which he topped the charts in 1960 with the novelty song "Alley-Oop". He also had hits as a producer and label owner. One of his records was "Monster Mash", which was written by Bobby "Boris" Pickett.

Paxton started the Bakersfield International label in the mid-1960s, attempting to cash in on the Bakersfield sound, recording out of a converted Flxible Flyer bus in which he built a mobile eight-track recording studio, working with a number of musicians. These included several who later went on to play in The Byrds and other country rock acts of the era, including the Gosdin Brothers, Dennis Payne and The Reasons (a group also known as Nashville West, which featured Gene Parsons, Clarence White, Gib Guilbeau and Wayne Moore). Many of these sessions ended up on low-budget releases and exploitative cover albums, such as Guitar Country by Bakersfield's Big Guitars on Jasico Records. It would appear that Paxton sold these sessions to other labels to finance projects closer to his heart. Paxton moved to Nashville in the early 1970s, had a lengthy friendship with Tammy Faye Bakker, recorded several country albums under his own name and also became well known in the gospel music world. He died in Branson, Missouri, in July 2016.

Battin recorded under his own name on Indigo Records, Invicta Records, Aurora Records, Record Records, Egan Records, Cenco Records, California Records, May Records, Groove Records, Audicon Records and Signpost Records. He also recorded under pseudonyms on many other record labels. He played in such groups as Evergreen Blueshoes, The Byrds, New Riders of the Purple Sage and the Flying Burrito Brothers, as well as doing session work with a wide variety of musicians. Battin died in Oregon in July 2003.

== Discography ==
=== Singles ===
Year	Title	Peak chart positions		Record Label	B-side
Year	Title	US	R&B	Record Label	B-side
1959	"It Was I"	11	—	Brent Records	"Lunch Hour"
1959	"Fancy Nancy"	71	—	Brent Records	"It Could Be"
1960	"Cherry Pie"	11	27	Brent Records	"(I'll Quit) Cryin' over You"
1960	"Hully Gully Cha Cha Cha"	109	—	Brent Records	"Teenage Honeymoon"
1960	"Willow Tree"	—	—	Brent Records	"Green Door"
1961	"Betty Jean"	—	—	Time Records	"Doubt"
1962	"One More Drink for Julie"	—	—	Brent Records	"Over the Mountain"
