= Silent Scythe =

Swedish thrash metal band

Silent Scythe was a Swedish thrash/power metal band.

The band came from Karlstad.

== Reception ==
Silent Scythe self-released the album Longing For Sorrow in 2003. Heavymetal.dk had a positive reaction to the mix between power and thrash, though the influences from Bay Area thrash were palpable and the riff carrying the second song was "the same as the one in Exodus' 'Toxic Waltz'". The reviewer also criticized the "annoying voice" of the singer, as well as the album closer, a "completely ridiculous" "salsa ballad". Further criticism followed in 2004, when Silent Scythe released Suffer in Silence on New Aeon Media. Heavymetal.dk soon found out that this album contained the exact same songs as Longing For Sorrow. To release the same album with a different name and cover bordered on a swindle, the reviewer opined.

Suffer in Silence also got a harsh reception elsewhere; Noise.fi giving it the lowest grade of 1. Scream Magazine was only slightly above that, handing out 2 points.

Others gave mediocre ratings; Rock Hard who gave a 6 out of 10 and Metal.de with 5 out of 10. Lack of originality was the main drawback. Contrary to others, this reviewer found the closing track to be the "treat", espousing a "cheerful mood that would certainly be suitable for a home beer tasting".

A positive reviewer was found in Powermetal.de, who praised several aspects of the album. The production was "absolutely fantastic". The musicianship was "powerful" and "remarkable"; while invoking many influences such as At the Gates and Iced Earth, it was still an original blend. A drawback was the low number of actual songs on the album, but there were highlights such as: "An up-tempo banger with Forbidden-esque verses and a sugary-sweet chorus, which they even deliver in an a cappella version at the end of the song, leaving the listener completely blown away. World-class".
