= The Hollywood Argyles =

American musical ensemble

The Hollywood Argyles were an American musical ensemble, assembled for studio recordings by the producer and songwriter Kim Fowley and his friend and fellow musician Gary S. Paxton. They had a US number one hit record, "Alley Oop" (Lute Records 5905), in 1960.

== "Alley Oop" ==
According to Paxton—who, at the time, was half of Skip & Flip—"Alley Oop" was written by Dallas Frazier as a country tune:

"As for the name, Kim Fowley and I were living in a $15-a-week room in Hollywood. ... Since I was still under contract (to Brent Records) as 'Flip,' I couldn't put my name on 'Alley Oop.' Seeing that the studio was on the corner of Hollywood Blvd. and Argyle Street, I decided on Hollywood Argyles. Other than myself, there were no actual Hollywood Argyles. Everyone else on the track was either a friend or a studio musician who I paid $25 apiece for the session. When 'Alley Oop' suddenly took off and people wanted to book us for concerts, there was no such group."

The "Alley Oop" session was produced by Fowley, who recalled that "all the participants were hopelessly drunk on cider by the time they recorded the song." According to some reports, the lead vocalist on the track "Alley Oop" is Norm Davis, although the voice on the record has been identified as a match with other recordings sung by Paxton from the same era, such as "Spookie Movies".

According to Paxton, the group consisted of Ronnie Silico on drums, Gaynel Hodge on piano, Harper Cosby on bass, and Sandy Nelson (of "Teen Beat" fame) playing percussion on tambourine and a garbage can. Nelson also provided background screams in the song. The background singers included Dallas Frazier, Buddy Mize, Scott Turner, and a woman named Diane.

"Alley Oop" was the first song played on WLS-AM Radio in Chicago on May 2, 1960, when it changed format from farm programming to rock and roll.

"Alley Oop" charted for 15 weeks on the Billboard Hot 100, peaking at number one for the week of July 11, 1960. The song sold over one million copies and was awarded a gold disc by the RIAA.

=== Other versions ===
According to Jerry Osborne, two other groups—Dante and the Evergreens (Madison 130) and the Dyna-Sores (Rendezvous 120)—had versions of "Alley Oop" on the Billboard charts at the same time, peaking at No. 15 and No. 59, respectively.

== Later activities ==
Frazier is perhaps best known for writing the song "There Goes My Everything", a hit song for Jack Greene in 1966 and Engelbert Humperdinck in 1967. Frazier also wrote and recorded "Elvira", which became a 1981 country hit for the Oak Ridge Boys.

Paxton later formed Garpax Records and became a gospel artist.

Fowley soon produced the Murmaids' 1963 hit "Popsicles and Icicles" (US No. 3). He also helped bring together the Runaways in 1975, as well as the Orchids (not the Scottish band, but another American all-female band). Their 1980 album, The Orchids, was released on MCA Records as MCA-3235.

== Discography ==
=== Singles ===
Year	Title	Peak chart positions			Record Label	Album	B-side
Year	Title	US Pop	US R&B	UK	Record Label	Album	B-side
1960	"Alley Oop"	1	3	24	Lute	The Hollywood Argyles	"Sho’ Know a Lot About Love"
1960	"Gun Totin' Critter Called Jack"	—	—	—	Lute	The Hollywood Argyles	"Bug Eye"
1960	"Hully Gully"	—	—	—	Lute	The Hollywood Argyles	"So Fine"
1960	"You Been Torturing Me (A Hay-Hay-Honeypot)"	—	—	—	Paxley		"The Grubble"
1961	"See You in the Morning"	—	—	—	Finer Arts		"The Morning After (The Night Before)"
1963	"(My Real Boss) Bossy-Nover"	—	—	—	Felsted		"Find Another Way"
1965	"Long Hair, Unsquare Dude Called Jack"	—	—	—	Chattahoochee		"Ole'"

== Bibliography ==
- Joel Whitburn; Top 40 Hits ISBN 0-8230-8280-6
- Steve Propes; Golden Goodies ISBN 0-8019-6220-X
