= Up the Academy =

1980 comedy film by Robert Downey Sr

- Theatrical release poster by Jack Rickard
- Directed by: Robert Downey Sr.
- Written by: Tom Patchett; Jay Tarses
- Based on: Mad by EC Comics
- Produced by: Danton Rissner; Marvin Worth
- Starring: Wendell Brown; Tommy Citera; Ron Leibman; Harry Teinowitz; Hutch Parker; Ralph Macchio; Tom Poston; King Coleman; Barbara Bach
- Cinematography: Harry Stradling Jr.
- Edited by: Bud Molin; Ron Spang
- Music by: Jeff Rawluk
- Production company: Warner Bros.
- Distributed by: Warner Bros.
- Release date: June 6, 1980
- Running time: 87 minutes
- Country: United States
- Language: English
- Budget: $5 million
- Box office: $10 million

Mad Magazine Presents Up the Academy (often shortened to Up the Academy) is a 1980 American comedy film directed by Robert Downey Sr. and starring Wendell Brown, Tommy Citera, Ron Leibman, Harry Teinowitz, Hutch Parker, Ralph Macchio, Tom Poston, King Coleman, and Barbara Bach. The plot concerns the antics of a group of cadets at a military school.

== Plot ==
Four troublemaking young men are assigned to Weinberg Military Academy as punishment for their antics: Chooch, the heir to an organized crime family; Ike, a faith healer's son; Hash, the son of an Arab sheik; and Oliver, whose governor father is up for re-election. In charge of these new recruits is sadistic Major Vaughn Liceman. Three of the four new recruits establish themselves as troublemakers from the start, but Chooch wants to go straight and focuses on his studies. A short time after they are joined by a new roommate, Rodney, who was expelled from other schools because of his pyromaniac tendencies.

When Oliver's girlfriend from back home, Candy, ends up enrolled at a nearby girls military school, the recruits plot to sneak out. They succeed, but when they return they find that Liceman knows about everything and even has compromising pictures of Oliver and Candy, which he threatens to use to damage the Governor's re-election bid. The boys assume Chooch is the snitch, but he discovers Rodney is the guilty party. In retaliation, the boys hatch a new plan to get dirty photos of Liceman with Candy, and retrieve the original blackmail photos.

The counter-blackmail plan takes place during the academy's soccer game. In the midst of the action, Rodney repents his actions and launches a rocket that destroys Liceman's cabin. The academy wins the soccer game, and the blackmail plot is foiled. The movie ends with Liceman chasing Ike, Oliver, Hash, Chooch, Candy, and Rodney while Liceman yells "play it again", playing the scene three times as Alfred E. Neuman looks on.

== Cast ==
- Ron Leibman as Maj. Vaughn Liceman (uncredited)
- Wendell Brown as Eisenhower "Ike" MacArthur
- Tommy Citera as El-Hashid "Hash" Amier Jr.
- Hutch Parker as Oliver Holt
- Ralph Macchio as Chooch Bambalazi
- Harry Teinowitz as Rodney Ververgaert
- Tom Poston as MSG. Skip Sisson
- Ian Wolfe as Commandant Causeway
- Antonio Fargas as Coach
- Stacy Nelkin as Candy
- Barbara Bach as Bliss
- Leonard Frey as Keck

== Production ==
The film was an attempt to cash in on the phenomenal and unexpected success of National Lampoon's Animal House, which was also a film made by a comedy magazine about a group of misfits at college. In 1983, Mad publisher Bill Gaines explained the genesis of his magazine's involvement in the film to The Comics Journal:

What happened is that we had a contract with Warner Brothers to put out a Mad movie. It's like four years old now. They came up with a script that we didn't like, and then they came up with a script using our scriptwriters that they didn't like, but meanwhile they threw this script onto our desk ... Although there were many things in it that I thought were offensive and should be removed, generally I liked the script. And I thought, "Well, in addition to a Mad movie, there's nothing wrong with having something like Lampoon did with Animal House." Animal House was "Lampoon Presents" and really had nothing to do with the magazine, it was just using their name, and it was a good movie, and it was very successful, and it made Lampoon a lot of money. I guess. So we were going to do the same thing. "Mad Magazine Completely Disassociates Itself from Up the Academy". But that was too long for them, they can't think in that many words. They put the damn thing out without all the deletions they had promised to make, which means they're liars. I'm talking about one of my sister companies [laughter] ... And there we were connected with it, and there wasn't much we could do about it. I paid Warner Brothers 30 grand to take Mad's name off for television. So for $30,000 we got out of being associated with it on Home Box Office. It won't say "Mad Magazine Presents" and Alfred E. Neuman won't be in it. And it was well worth $30,000. [laughter]

It was directed by Robert Downey Sr., and starred Wendell Brown, Tommy Citera, Harry Teinowitz, Hutch Parker (younger brother of Parker Stevenson), Tom Poston, Barbara Bach, Stacey Nelkin, Ralph Macchio (his screen debut) and King Coleman. The movie was filmed mostly in Salina, Kansas, mostly on the campus of St. John's Military School, and in smaller parts in Brookville, Kansas and the rural areas south of Salina, toward Mentor, Kansas, all within Saline County.

== Critical response ==
On the review aggregation website Rotten Tomatoes, 0% of 5 critics' reviews are positive, with an average rating of 3.9/10. Metacritic, which uses a weighted average, assigned the film a score of 29 out of 100, based on 4 critics, indicating "generally unfavorable" reviews.

The film was neither a commercial nor critical success when it was originally released, and was disowned by both the staff of Mad magazine and actor Ron Leibman (who, despite his sizable role, had his name completely removed from the credits and promotional material). Besides paying Warner Bros. $30,000 to remove all references to Mad from the film when it was released on home video, Mad's publisher William Gaines issued personal handwritten apologies to every person that wrote the magazine to complain.

After Gaines' death in 1992, all references to the magazine were reinstated on cable television. In 2006, the original version of the film was issued on DVD. Reflecting on the film, Downey Sr. later referred to it as "one of the worst fucking things in history."

== Production notes ==
- Makeup effects artist Rick Baker designed the Alfred E. Neuman masks for the film.
- A young Robert Downey Jr. appears as an extra in some soccer scenes.

== References in Mad ==
- In the tradition of Mad making fun of movies, the magazine spoofed their own film with "Mad Magazine Resents Throw Up the Academy". The parody mainly concerned Ron Leibman's name being removed, and the teenage troublemakers being punished by having to star in the film. Unlike most Mad movie parodies which are often several pages in length, this one was only two (appearing in place of the magazine's usual letters column), as the piece devolved into a series of supposed interoffice memos by the writer, artist and editors, all decrying their role in the parody. Finally, a fake note said that the entire staff of Mad quit over their shame, and the article was thereby discontinued.
- The statue featuring Alfred E. Neuman with a pigeon on his head is located in Mad's editorial offices.
