= Steve Alaimo =

American pop singer (1939–2024)

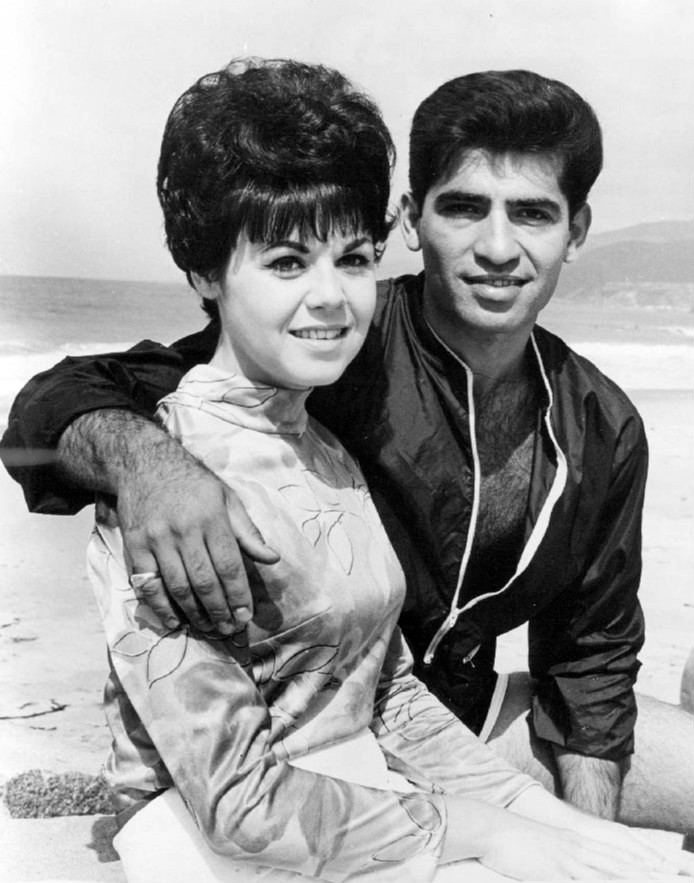
Alaimo and Linda Scott on Where the Action Is, 1966.

Stephen Charles Alaimo (December 6, 1939 – November 30, 2024) was an American singer who was a teen idol in the early 1960s. He later became a record producer and label owner, but he is perhaps best known for hosting and co-producing Dick Clark's Where the Action Is in the late 1960s. He had nine singles appear on the US Billboard Hot 100 chart without once reaching the Top 40, the most by any artist not reaching the Top 40.

== Early years and the Redcoats ==
Alaimo was born on December 6, 1939, in Omaha, Nebraska, and moved to Rochester, New York, at the age of five. He entered the music business during his time as a pre-med student at the University of Miami, joining his cousin's instrumental rock band the Redcoats, becoming the guitarist, and eventually, the singer. The Redcoats consisted of Jim Alaimo on rhythm guitar, Brad Shapiro on bass, and Jim "Chris" Christy on drums. After playing a sock hop held by local disc jockey Bob Green and label owner Henry Stone, the band earned a record deal with Stone's Marlin Records. In 1959, "I Want You To Love Me" became a regional hit for the band. Green became Alaimo's manager, ultimately giving up the role to Stone. That same year, Dick Clark's Caravan of Stars came to Miami needing a band to back up artists, so the Redcoats became that band.

== Solo career ==
The Redcoats broke up in 1960, and under Stone's tutelage, Alaimo became a "blue-eyed soul singer" with an all Black back-up band. Alaimo and the group became the house band for a local club at the Eden Roc Hotel. Despite his rising local fame, he released two solo albums that did not earn him the national spotlight. On September 23, 1964, Alaimo opened the concert at the Alexandria (Va.) Roller Rink ahead of The Mugwumps and The Beach Boys. During this time, Stone put Alaimo to work as a promotion man for Stone's Tone Distributors, which acquainted him with the music industry at large.

== National recording career ==
Through his promotion job, Alaimo landed his first major record deal with Checker Records, a subsidiary of Chess Records, in 1961. There, he struck a minor amount of gold in 1963 with his single "Every Day I Have to Cry," written by Muscle Shoals singer-songwriter, Arthur Alexander. The record peaked at Number 46 on Billboard's Hot 100. The song was a top-five hit in Miami, on local radio stations WQAM and WFUN (AM). Later that year, Alaimo left Checker for Imperial Records, and ABC Records, but the fame of his recording career would soon be eclipsed.

== Television host ==
Dick Clark proposed to hire the Redcoats again for his music program Where the Action Is, but the group had broken up. Instead, Clark hired Alaimo as host and music director. Alaimo took the opportunity to promote his own records on-air; however, he rarely had time to record new songs. Alaimo would also become co-producer of the program, which lasted from 1965 to 1967.

== Music production and acting ==
After the show's end, Alaimo signed with Atlantic Records/Atco Records. In the mid-1960s, he began producing music for groups such as Sam & Dave, Harold Melvin & the Bluenotes, and The 31st of February. Alaimo bought partial songwriting credits to some of Gregg Allman's songs recorded with the 31st of February. This became a very fertile period, with Alaimo producing many hit records. He also briefly tried his hand at acting during this time, appearing in four feature films, such as 1967's Wild Rebels and 1970's exploitation crime drama The Naked Zoo, starring Rita Hayworth. Most of his films became forgotten fodder, although Wild Rebels received renewed interest after being featured in an episode of TV's, Mystery Science Theater 3000.

== TK Records ==
In 1969, Henry Stone reunited with Alaimo, who set up Alston Records as an outlet for Alaimo's music. Alaimo quit performing to focus on running a record label. In 1972, Timmy Thomas hit with "Why Can't We Live Together" for Stone's Glade Records, which released the single in partnership with Atlantic Records. Stone then consolidated many of his labels under the TK Records umbrella with Alaimo in 1973, releasing records independent of the major label system. In 1974, Harry Wayne Casey and Rick Finch presented a demo to Stone and Alaimo, and they advised having George McCrae sing the final version. The song, "Rock Your Baby", charted as a number-one single in 1974. Shortly afterward, the business partnership of Casey, Finch, Alaimo and Stone would achieve their greatest commercial success with the heyday of KC & the Sunshine Band.

== Vision Records ==
TK Records closed in 1981, forcing Henry Stone to seek out Morris Levy for financial relief and forging a new partnership. Alaimo, edged out of the deal, had fallen on hard times. In 1987, Alaimo was back on his feet, forming Vision Records with engineering producers Ron and Howard Albert. Vision specialized in top-notch recordings for stars who had once graced Criteria Studios during the 1970s. The label also dabbled in the production and promotion of Miami Bass records, including artists such as Beatmaster Clay D. Along with the Albert Brothers, the trio formed Audio Vision studios in 1987 which would have numerous hits in a variety of genres including hip-hop and classic rock for the next 35 years.

== Death ==
Alaimo died on November 30, 2024, six days before his 85th birthday.

== Discography ==
=== Studio albums ===
- 1961: Twist with Steve Alaimo
- 1962: Mashed Potatoes
- 1963: Every Day I Have to Cry
- 1963: Steve Alaimo
- 1965: Starring Steve Alaimo
- 1965: Where the Action Is
- 1966: Steve Alaimo Sings and Swings

=== Compilation albums ===
- 1996: Hits and Rarities
- 1997: Anthology
- 2005: 50s-70s

=== Singles ===
Year	Song	US Hot 100	Cashbox	Album
1962	"Mashed Potatoes"	81	124	Mashed Potatoes
1962	"Every Day I Have to Cry"	46	45	
1963	"It's a Long, Long Way to Happiness"	-	-	
1963	"Don't Let the Sun Catch You Crying"	125	126	Every Day I Have to Cry
1963	"Michael"	100	105	
1963	"Gotta Lotta Love"	74	94	
1964	"Love's Gonna Live Here"	-	-	Steve Alaimo Sings and Swings
1964	"Fade In- Fade Out"	-	-	Steve Alaimo Sings and Swings
1964	"Happy"	-	-	
1964	"I Don't Know"	103	115	Starring Steve Alaimo
1965	"Real Live Girl"	77	86	Steve Alaimo Sings and Swings
1965	"Tomorrow Is Another Day"	–	109	
1965	"Cast Your Fate to the Wind"	89	120	Steve Alaimo Sings and Swings
1965	"Blowin' in the Wind"	–	139	Where the Action Is
1966	"Once a Day"	-	-	Steve Alaimo Sings and Swings
1966	"So Much Love"	92	72	
1966	"Happy" (reissue)	-	-	
1966	"Pardon Me (It's My First Day Alone)"	-	-	
1967	"You Don't Know Like I Know"	–	116	
1967	"New Orleans"	126	–	
1968	"Denver"	118	–	
1969	"After the Smoke Is Gone" with Betty Wright	–	126	
1969	"One Woman"	101	132	
1971	"When My Little Girl Is Smiling"	72	101	
1972	"Amerikan Music"	79	94	

Cast Your Fate to the Wind peaked at No. 22 on Billboard's Adult Contemporary Chart
When My Little Girl Is Smiling peaked at No. 27 on Billboard's Adult Contemporary Chart

In Canada, he had just three songs on the charts. "I Don't Know" and "Real Live Girl" both reached No. 43 and "So Much Love" was No. 61.
