= Mashed Potato (dance) =

Popular dance craze of 1962

- Inventor: James Brown
- Year: 1962

The Mashed Potato is a dance move which was a popular dance craze of 1962. The dance move and mashed potato song were first made famous by James Brown in 1959 and used in his concerts regularly. It was also a dance done to songs such as Dee Dee Sharp's "Mashed Potato Time". The move vaguely resembles that of the twist, by Sharp's fellow Philadelphian Chubby Checker. The dance was also mentioned in the lyrics of Motown's hit song "Do You Love Me", written by Berry Gordy Jr. and performed by The Contours in 1962.

== Dance movement ==
The dance move begins by stepping backward with one foot with that heel tilted inward. The foot is positioned slightly behind the other stationary foot. With the weight on the ball of the starting foot, the heel is then swiveled outward. The same process is repeated with the other foot: step back and behind with heel inward, pivot heel out, and so on. The pattern is continued for as many repetitions as desired. The step may be incorporated in various dances either as a separate routine or as a styling of standard steps.

== Songs ==
Several songs inspired by the dance were hits, including "(Do the) Mashed Potatoes" by Nat Kendrick and the Swans (with vocals by King Coleman), "Mashed Potatoes U.S.A." by James Brown, and "Mashed Potato Time" and "Gravy (For My Mashed Potatoes)", both by Dee Dee Sharp. In Australia the dance underwent a revival with Billy Thorpe and the Aztecs' version of "Mashed Potato" in 1964 and in France a song called "C'est le mashed potatoes" was performed by Johnny Hallyday in the early 1960s.

== Dance variations and cultural references ==
The dance was referred to in Connie Francis' 1962 hit "V-A-C-A-T-I-O-N" ("...we'll Mashed Potato to a jukebox tune..."), "Do You Love Me" by the Contours, "Let's Dance" by Chris Montez, "Harry the Hairy Ape" a 1963 Top-20 pop and R&B novelty hit by Ray Stevens, "Land of a Thousand Dances", "Having a Party" by Sam Cooke, "Do the Strand" by Roxy Music and in Ray Charles' version of "Shake a Tail Feather". The dance is also referenced in The Orlons 1962 song "Wah Watusi".

A variation on the Mashed Potato was danced to Bobby "Boris" Pickett's novelty hit "Monster Mash", in which the footwork was the same, but "monster gestures" were made with the arms and hands.

The dance was one of the inspirations for the Exodus song "The Toxic Waltz", from their 1989 album Fabulous Disaster.
