= Steve Alaimo Sings and Swings =

Studio album by Steve Alaimo
- Released: 1965
- Genre: Pop
- Label: ABC

Steve Alaimo chronology
Where the Action Is (1965)	Steve Alaimo Sings and Swings (1965)	Hits and Rarities (1996)

Steve Alaimo Sings and Swings is Steve Alaimo's seventh album and third for the ABC-Paramount label.

== Track listing ==
=== Side 1 ===
1. "Cast Your Fate to the Wind"
2. "Lady of the House"
3. "Love Is a Many Splendored Thing"
4. "Let Her Go"
5. "Need You"
6. "Real Live Girl"

=== Side 2 ===
1. "Mais Oui"
2. "Fade Out - Fade In"
3. "Truer Than True"
4. "Bright Lights"
5. "Once a Day"
6. "Love's Gonna Live Here"
