= King Coleman =

American singer-songwriter

- Birth name: Carlton Coleman
- Born: January 20, 1932; Tampa, Florida, United States
- Died: September 11, 2010 (aged 78); Miami, Florida, United States
- Genres: Rhythm and blues
- Occupation(s): Musician, disc jockey, actor, Baptist minister
- Years active: 1947–2010

Carlton "King" Coleman (January 20, 1932 – September 11, 2010) was an American rhythm and blues singer and musician, known for providing the vocals for the 1959 hit single, "(Do The) Mashed Potatoes", recorded with James Brown's band. Over the course of his singing career, Coleman released numerous singles that have been re-released on compilation albums, as well as the 2003 retrospective, It's Dance Time, released by Norton Records. He performed on stage as recently as 2005 on a tour of the U.S. East Coast, backed by the Florida garage band The Creepy T's, headlining the WFMU record fair in New York City.

Coleman worked as a radio disc jockey, starting out at Tampa's WTMP and Miami's WFEC and eventually WMBM, where he was one of the city's most popular DJs in the late 1950s. In the mid-`60s, he hosted a popular show on WWRL in New York City, as well as some rock and roll shows at theaters in Manhattan. In more recent years, Coleman hosted a six-hour nightly radio show entitled "Nothing But Love", also on WMBM, now a gospel station. In 1971, Coleman released a gospel album entitled "Rock Gospel Time / The Rock Ministry" on Brunswick Records as Reverend C. Coleman.

Coleman has also performed as an actor, appearing in several movies and on television programs, including Claudine, Welcome Back Kotter, Up the Academy, and Bad Boys II.

Coleman was also the father of the drummer and recording artist, Tony Coleman, who has often performed with B.B. King.

He died in Miami, Florida, at the age of 78.
