= Trouble (Lindsey Buckingham song) =

1981 single by Lindsey Buckingham

Single by Lindsey Buckingham

from the album Law and Order
- B-side: "That's How We Do It in L.A."
- Released: October 1981 (US)
- Recorded: 1981
- Length: 3:56
- Label: Asylum
- Songwriter: Lindsey Buckingham
- Producers: Lindsey Buckingham, Richard Dashut

Lindsey Buckingham singles chronology
"Trouble" (1981)	"It Was I" (1981)

"Trouble" is the debut solo single by Lindsey Buckingham, released in 1981 from his debut solo album Law and Order. The single was Buckingham's first hit as a solo artist, peaking at number nine in the US and number 31 in the UK, where it remained charted for seven weeks. In Australia, it topped the chart for three weeks and became the eighth biggest-selling single of 1982. It experienced similar levels of success in South Africa, reaching number one for two weeks and finishing 1982 as the country's 13th best-selling single.

== Recording ==
"Trouble" was the only track on Law and Order on which Buckingham played neither bass nor drums. Buckingham wanted the song to have a "live feel" and recruited George Hawkins and his Fleetwood Mac bandmate Mick Fleetwood to play bass guitar and drums respectively. Hawkins had previously worked with Fleetwood on The Visitor earlier that year. He remembered that they played to a pre-existing backing track that Buckingham had prepared.

Buckingham believed none of Fleetwood's takes were satisfactory from start to finish, so a tape loop of one of Fleetwood's drum tracks (about four seconds long) was used throughout the song: "The irony of that was that the original reason for having Mick play on the song was to approach the track completely live, as opposed to my usual technique." Buckingham later overdubbed some additional drum fills and cymbal crashes to create the illusion of live drums. The song opens with a count-off from Buckingham saying "two, three, four", which was clipped and looped to a length that was similar to Fleetwood's drum loop.

Buckingham recorded some half-speed guitars for the choruses along with a Spanish influenced guitar solo, the latter of which he was particularly proud of. The half-speed guitars were recorded at 15 IPS and later sped up to 30 IPS. He also overdubbed a gut-string guitar and said that there were "a lot of subtle things supporting the vocals."

== Release ==
One year after the release of his Law and Order album, Buckingham said that "everyone thought that "Trouble" was a standout. There are other things on the album that I enjoy more on a different level because they're a little more off the wall, or they're not quite as mainstream. I wasn’t really surprised that the single did that well." He commented in a 2018 interview with Stereogum that "Trouble" lacked the campiness that the rest of Law and Order possessed, which he believed factored into the record label's decision to release "Trouble" as a single. He also told Entertainment Weekly in 2021 that he wrote "Trouble" with the intention of demonstrating his capabilities of writing lighter and melodic songs.

In Fleetwood Mac, [I was] called upon to do more the rock side of things, but not necessarily the mid-tempo pretty stuff. I had that in me, and "Trouble" was a good representation of that. I was covering a broader landscape musically.

— Lindsey Buckingham

== Critical reception ==
Record World called the song an "out-of-the box" smash with a sound that was "simply dazzling." Writing for Billboard, Sam Sutherland wrote that the song showcased Buckingham's "chiming acoustic guitar signatures" and said that the lyrics were both "coy" and "romantic". Cashbox referred to the song as a "pop smash" and noted the "precision" of Buckingham's guitar playing.

Writing for Stereo Review, Steve Simels called "Trouble" "an extremely attractive, wistful little song that, done straight, would not have been out of place on Rumours". He felt that Buckingham's vocal delivery sounded "absurdly breathy" that resulted in a "strangely paranoid" feel to the song. In his review for Creem magazine, Gene Sculatt described the song as "a precious distillate of the cool artesian water that ran through Sunflower itself, saved and salved to yet another impenetrable song-subject." Andy Claps of AllMusic praised "Trouble" for its "overwhelmingly strong" melody and "soothing atmosphere that slides around the listener like a security blanket."

== Music video ==
The music video for "Trouble" was directed by Jerry Watson and features a multi-instrumental "big band" consisting of six guitarists and six drummers, including Mick Fleetwood. Walter Egan also appears in the music video as the second guitarist from the front. The video also features ex-Fleetwood Mac guitarists Bob Welch, who appears in the music video as the third guitarist from the front, and Bob Weston, as well as Dwight Twilley, who appears in the music video as the second guitarist from the back, and Andy Ward (the drummer from Camel).

== Track listings ==
=== 7": Asylum Records / E-47223 (US) ===
- A "Trouble" – 3:45
- B "Mary Lee Jones" – 3:12

=== 7": Mercury / 6000 743 (Australia) ===
- A "Trouble" – 3:56
- B "That's How We Do It in L.A." – 2:52

== Personnel ==
- Lindsey Buckingham – vocals, guitars, electric piano, drum overdubs and percussion
- George Hawkins – bass
- Mick Fleetwood – drums

== Charts ==
=== Weekly charts ===
Chart (1981–1982)	Peak position
Australia (Kent Music Report)	1
Austria (Ö3 Austria Top 40)	16
Belgium (Ultratop 50 Flanders)	40
Canada Top Singles (RPM)	7
Canada Adult Contemporary (RPM)	9
Ireland (IRMA)	24
Netherlands (Single Top 100)	41
New Zealand (Recorded Music NZ)	3
South Africa (Springbok Radio)	1
UK Singles (Official Charts)	31
US Billboard Hot 100	9
US Adult Contemporary (Billboard)	14
US Mainstream Rock Airplay (Billboard)	12
US Cash Box Top 100	8
West Germany (GfK)	39

=== Year-end charts ===
Chart (1981)	Position
US Cash Box Top 100	75

Chart (1982)	Position
Australia (Kent Music Report)	8
Canada Top Singles (RPM)	83
South Africa (Springbok Radio)	13
US Billboard Hot 100	45

== Certifications and sales ==
Region	Certification	Certified units/sales
Australia (ARIA)	Gold	50,000^{^}
^{^} Shipments figures based on certification alone.

== In other media ==
- The song is heard in the film Just One of the Guys during the blind date.
- Metavari recorded a cover version of "Trouble" for their 2017 Record Store Day release, Metropolis (An Original Re-Score by Metavari), on One Way Static Records and distributed in the United States by Light in the Attic Records.
- The song is heard over the credits in the final episode of the controversial Netflix series 13 Reasons Why.
