= Monster Mash (1995 film) =

- Directed by: Joel Cohen; Alec Sokolow
- Screenplay by: Joel Cohen; Alec Sokolow
- Based on: "Monster Mash" by Bobby Pickett; I'm Sorry the Bridge is Out, You'll Have to Spend the Night by Bobby Pickett and Sheldon Allman
- Produced by: Michael Kates; Nathaniel Kramer
- Starring: Bobby Pickett; Candace Cameron; Ian Bohen
- Cinematography: Scott Andrew Ressler
- Edited by: Stephen Mirrione
- Music by: Bobby Pickett; Joe Troiano; Jeffrey Zahn
- Production company: Prism Pictures
- Distributed by: Prism Pictures
- Release date: November 14, 1995
- Country: United States
- Language: English

Monster Mash (also known as Monster Mash: The Movie and Frankenstein Sings) is a 1995 musical comedy horror film written and directed by Joel Cohen and Alec Sokolow, based on Bobby Pickett's 1962 novelty song "Monster Mash" and the 1967 stage musical, I'm Sorry the Bridge is Out, You'll Have to Spend the Night, also by Pickett and Sheldon Allman. The film adaptation follows Mary and Scott, a young couple who find themselves spending Halloween night at the mansion of Dr. Victor Frankenstein. Along with housemates Igor, Count Dracula, Wolfie, Frankenstein's monster, and a reanimated Elvis Presley, Dr. Frankenstein takes a personal interest in what secret designs await the main characters.

It features seven musical numbers. Starring Pickett himself as Dr. Frankenstein, alongside Candace Cameron and Ian Bohen, the film was theatrically released on November 14, 1995, by Prism Pictures.

== Plot ==
A teenage couple, Mary and Scott, are on their way home from a Halloween party when car trouble prompts them to seek help at the old mansion of Victor Frankenstein, a mad scientist from Hyannis Port. Once inside, they meet a host of strange characters resembling the Universal Monsters, at whose mercy Scott and Mary suddenly find themselves when Frankenstein informs them, "I'm sorry the bridge is out, you'll have to spend the night!"

Each character has his or her own secret designs on Mary and Scott. Frankenstein wants to take Scott's brain and put it in his latest creation. Meanwhile, Frankenstein's assistant, Igor, develops feelings for Mary, especially after she encourages him to be confident and "play your hunch", thinking that, once Scott's brain has been removed, Igor's own brain can replace it. Count Dracula and his wife, Countess Natasha, a pair of vampires, decide to spice up their lifeless marriage ("Eternity Blues") by feasting on Mary and Scott respectively, but Dracula instead decides to take Mary as his next wife. Wolfie is constantly struggling with his lycanthropy and worrying his helicopter mother ("Things a Mother Goes Through"), who insists on setting Mary up with her son in hopes of curing him since Frankenstein refuses. Finally, a jive-talking musician's agent named Hathaway has revived Elvis Presley as a bandaged mummy and plans to launch his new client's comeback, but in order to fully restore The King to life, they need the blood of a virgin, a bill that Mary and Scott both fit. Both Igor and Wolfie lament their insecurities and lack of love life to Mary, who does her best to comfort them.

By the next morning, Dracula is forced back into his coffin just before sunlight (having not noticed the end of daylight saving time), Hathaway and Elvis are trapped in the sarcophagus without the needed sacrifice, and Igor betrays Frankenstein by tricking the doctor into switching his own mind with Igor's instead of Scott's with the monster's. Mary and Scott escape unharmed, and the previously mute Frankenstein's monster reveals he could speak all along with his last line: "I am surrounded by idiots".

== Cast ==
- Bobby Pickett – Dr. Frankenstein
- Candace Cameron – Mary
- Ian Bohen – Scott
- John Kassir – Igor
- Anthony Crivello – Count Dracula
- Sarah Douglas – Countess Natasha "Nasty" Dracula
- Adam Shankman – Wolfie
- Mink Stole – Wolfie's Mother
- Deron McBee – The Monster
- Jimmie Walker – Hathaway
- E. Aron Price – Elvis/The Mummy
- Linda Cevallos – Dancer #1
- Carrie Ann Inaba – Dancer #2
- Daryl Richardson – Dancer #3

== Musical numbers ==
1. "I'm Sorry the Bridge is Out, You'll Have to Spend the Night" – Dr. Frankenstein, Igor, Dracula, Natasha, Wolfie's mother, Wolfie, and Dancers
2. "Play Your Hunch" – Mary, Igor, and Dancers
3. "On a Night Like This" – Scott and Mary
4. "Eternity Blues" – Dracula, Natasha, and Dancers
5. "Monster Mash" – Dr. Frankenstein and Company
6. "Things a Mother Goes Through" – Wolfie's mother
7. "You're About to Lose Your Mind"^{†} – Linda Cevallos, Carrie Ann Inaba, and Daryl Richardson

^{†} This song is heard during the film's closing credits.

== Departures from the stage musical ==
Monster Mash is decidedly very different from I'm Sorry the Bridge is Out, You'll Have to Spend the Night. While the premise and basic plot are the same, much of the music and certain characters were reworked for the film version to better reflect the 1990s setting. The script was modernized to incorporate topical jokes, with references to Jack Kevorkian, QVC, Chia Pets and Hillary Clinton.

=== Characters ===
Bohen's character, "Scott", is named "John" in the stage show and Stole's "Wolfie's mother" is named "Mom Talbot", an explicit reference to Larry Talbot, the name of the title character in the 1940 film The Wolf Man. "The Mummy" was rewritten as Elvis Presley, who was still alive when the original show was conceived, and "The Mummy's" factotum, "Dr. Abdul Nasser", became Elvis' manager, here renamed Hathaway instead of Presley's real manager, Colonel Tom Parker (who was still alive at the time of the film), and is tailored to Walker's jiving screen persona. The ever-present dancers in the film are based on Count Dracula's onstage harem of "Draculettes". Dracula's motivations are also slightly different: onstage, he seeks to turn Mary into a Draculette while feasting on her boyfriend, whereas in the film Dracula and his wife decide to share the teenagers from the outset. In addition, the stage production includes several characters who do not appear in the film, including Renfield (from Bram Stoker's Dracula), two graverobbers named Montclair and Clairmont, and a not-quite-dead body.

=== Music ===
The music also underwent some significant changes. Only four of the twelve songs from the original show appear in the film in some form: "I'm Sorry the Bridge Is Out, You'll Have to Spend the Night", "Play Your Hunch", "Eternity Blues", and "Things a Mother Goes Through". The songs "On a Night Like This" and "You're About to Lose Your Mind" were written and recorded specifically for the film; the writers, Jeffrey Zahn and Joe Troiano, would later collaborate with Pickett on the film version of Spookley the Square Pumpkin. A new version of "Monster Mash" was also recorded and used, even though the song does not appear in the original stage play.

== Reception ==
David Andreas of SplatterCritic.com rated the film 2.5 stars out of 4, describing it as, "a strange blend of typical horror tropes, amid atypical musical numbers, that succeeds as a whole mainly for existing since there aren't many other films like this (for better and for worse)".

== See also ==
- List of films set around Halloween
