= Anthology (Steve Alaimo album) =

Compilation album by Steve Alaimo
- Released: 1997
- Genre: Pop
- Length: 78:37
- Label: Hot Productions

Steve Alaimo chronology
| Hits and Rarities (1996) | Anthology (1997) | 50s-70s (2005) |

Anthology is a 31-track collection of songs that Steve Alaimo recorded during the sixties and seventies.

== Track listing ==
1. "Love's Gonna Live Here" - (Buck Owens) - 1:57
2. "I Don't Know" - (Lloyd Campbell) - 2:31
3. "Happy" - (Ray Stevens) - 2:23
4. "Everybody Knows But Her" - (John R. Adkins) - 2:31
5. "Real Live Girl" - (Cy Coleman, Carolyn Leigh) - 2:21
6. "Cast Your Fate to the Wind" - (Vince Guaraldi) - 2:18
7. "Mais Oui" - (Mann Curtis, Carlo Donida, Pinchi) - 2:43
8. "The Lady of the House" - (Boudleaux Bryant, Felice Bryant) - 2:44
9. "Blowin' in the Wind" - (Bob Dylan) - 2:37
10. "So Much Love" - (Gerry Goffin, Carole King) - 2:50
11. "Pardon Me (It's My First Day Alone)" - (Steve Barri, P.F. Sloan) - 2:52
12. "You Don't Know Like I Know" - (Isaac Hayes, David Porter) - 2:05
13. "Ooh Poo Pah Doo" - (Jessie Hill) - 2:23
14. "New Orleans" - (Frank Guida, Joseph Royster) - 2:06
15. "Denver" - (Spooner Oldham, Dan Penn) - 2:58
16. "Watching the Trains Go By" - (Spooner Oldham, Dan Penn) - 2:43
17. "Thank You for the Sunshine" - (Jackie Avery, Valenia Frazier) - 2:30
18. "I'm Thankful" (duet with Betty Wright) - (Steve Alaimo, J.W. Alexander, Sam Cooke, Virginia Frazier) - 2:00
19. "After the Smoke Is Gone" (duet with Betty Wright) - (William Clarke, Clarence Reid) - 2:37
20. "Cry Myself to Sleep" - (Bob Crewe, Bob Gaudio) - 2:42
21. "Every Day I Have to Cry" - (Arthur Alexander) - 2:22
22. "A Lifetime of Loneliness" - (Burt Bacharach, Hal David) - 2:24
23. "Don't Let the Sun Catch You Crying" - (Churchill, Joe Greene, Kojlman) - 2:43
24. "Can't You See" - (Mickey Newbury) - 2:39
25. "The Wild Side of Life" - (Arlie Carter, William Warren) - 2:11
26. "When My Little Girl Is Smiling" - (Gerry Goffin, Carole King) - 2:31
27. "Nobody's Fool" - (Bobby Emmons, Dan Penn) - 2:51
28. "Amerikan Music" - (John Warren Carlton, Harold Wayne White) - 4:18
29. "Sand in My Pocket" - (Wes Ferrell, Ian Levine, Toni Wine) - 2:09
30. "She's My Baby" - (Steve Alaimo) - 2:32
31. "Bright Lights, Big City" - (Jimmy Reed) - 2:06
