= Starring Steve Alaimo =

Studio album by Steve Alaimo
- Released: 1965
- Genre: Ska
- Label: ABC

Steve Alaimo chronology
Steve Alaimo (1963)	Starring Steve Alaimo (1965)	Where the Action Is (1965)

Starring Steve Alaimo is Steve Alaimo's fifth album and first for the label of ABC-Paramount.

== Track listing ==
=== Side 1 ===
1. I Don't Know
2. Ya-Ya
3. Nobody Loves Me
4. I Don't Wanna Cry
5. Sammy Dead
6. People Act Funny

=== Side 2 ===
1. Everybody Likes to Do the Ska
2. Stand by Me
3. Behold
4. Soon You'll Be Gone
5. You're Driving Me Crazy
6. I Won't Let You Go
