= (Do the) Mashed Potatoes =

1960 single by Nat Kendrick and the Swans

Single by Nat Kendrick and the Swans

from the EP Mashed Potatoes
- A-side: "(Do the) Mashed Potatoes (Part 1)"
- B-side: "(Do the) Mashed Potatoes (Part 2)"
- Released: February 1960
- Recorded: December 1959
- Studio: Dukoff Studios (Miami, Florida)
- Genre: R&B
- Length: 1:55 (Part 1); 1:50 (Part 2)
- Label: Dade; 1804
- Songwriter: Dessie Rozier

Nat Kendrick and the Swans singles chronology
"(Do the) Mashed Potatoes" (1960)	"Dish Rag" (1960)

Audio video
- "[Do The] Mashed Potatoes, Pt. 1" on YouTube

"Mashed Potatoes"

Single by Steve Alaimo

from the album Mashed Potatoes
- A-side: "Mashed Potatoes (Part 1)"
- B-side: "Mashed Potatoes (Part 2)"
- Released: February 1962
- Genre: R&B
- Length: 2:25 (Part 1); 2:15 (Part 2)
- Label: Checker 1006
- Songwriter: Dessie Rozier

Steve Alaimo singles chronology
"The Waiting's So Hard" (1961)	"Mashed Potatoes" (1962)	"My Friends" (1962)

"(Do the) Mashed Potatoes" is a rhythm and blues instrumental. It was recorded by James Brown with his band in 1959 and released as a two-part single in 1960. For contractual reasons the recording was credited to "Nat Kendrick and the Swans".

== Circumstances of the recording ==
The recording of "(Do the) Mashed Potatoes" arose out of James Brown's success in using the Mashed Potato dance as part of his stage show. Brown wanted to record a Mashed Potatoes-themed instrumental with his band in order to capitalize on the dance's popularity. However, King Records head Syd Nathan, a frequent critic of Brown's proposals, would not allow it. (The first instrumental recorded by Brown and his band, titled "Doodle Bee" and credited to Brown's tenor saxophonist J.C. Davis, had not sold well when it was released on King's sister label Federal Records.) Brown approached Henry Stone, a friend in the music business who ran the Dade Records label, about recording the piece with him. Stone, although nervous about crossing Nathan (with whom he did business), arranged for Brown to record at his Miami studio.

"(Do The) Mashed Potatoes" was recorded with Brown playing the piano and shouting the song's title. To prevent Brown's voice from being recognized, Stone overdubbed shouted vocals by Carlton "King" Coleman, a local radio DJ, onto the recording, though Brown's voice remains audible in the background. Leadership of the band was officially credited to Nat Kendrick, who was Brown's drummer at the time, while the writing was credited to "Dessie Rozier", a pseudonym for Brown. A simple twelve bar blues tune, "(Do the) Mashed Potatoes" became a Top Ten R&B hit in 1960 and fed what would eventually grow into a national dance craze. The band recorded several more singles under the Nat Kendrick & the Swans name, including "Dish Rag", "Slow Down", and "Wobble Wobble", but none were successful. Eventually made aware of Brown's outside success, Syd Nathan relented and allowed him to release future instrumentals on King, starting with the 1961 single "Hold It" b/w "The Scratch".

James Brown had a second Mashed Potatoes-themed hit with "Mashed Potatoes U.S.A." in 1962.

== Personnel ==
"Nat Kendrick and the Swans"

- Carlton "King" Coleman – lead vocal overdubs
- Alfred Corley – alto saxophone
- J.C. Davis – tenor saxophone
- James Brown – piano, vocal yelps
- Bobby Roach – guitar
- Bernard Odum – bass
- Nat Kendrick – drums

== Charts ==
Chart (1960)	Peak position
Billboard Hot 100	84
Billboard Hot R&B Sides	8

Steve Alaimo version:

Chart (1962)	Peak position
Billboard Hot 100	74
Billboard Hot R&B Sides	?

== Other versions ==
Steve Alaimo released his version of the song in 1962 as a single, also on the album Mashed Potatoes.

The British beat group The Undertakers recorded a cover version of "(Do the) Mashed Potatoes" in 1963.

German beat group The Rattles recorded a version for their 1963 debut single A-side.

The Kingsmen covered the song on their 1964 album The Kingsmen in Person.

A re-recording of "(Do the) Mashed Potatoes" with the James Brown band and an unidentified vocalist was recorded on August 20, 1964, but remained unreleased until it was included on the a reissue of the James Brown compilation album Roots of a Revolution released in 1989.

James Brown recorded a remake of "(Do the) Mashed Potatoes" on April 17, 1966, featuring himself on organ that was featured on the album Soul Pride: The Instrumentals 1960-1969 released in 1993.

James Brown recorded another remake of "(Do the) Mashed Potatoes" with Bobby Byrd for his 1980 album Soul Syndrome published under Henry Stone's TK Records.

Surf rock group Man or Astroman released a cover of the song called "Space Potatoes" on their 1993 EP Captain Holojoy's Space Diner, with modified lyrics.

An undubbed version of the original 1959 recording without "King" Coleman was released by Henry Stone Music for the Nat Kendrick and The Swans album in 2004.
