= Nathaniel Kramer =

American film director

- Born: 1961 (age 64–65)
- Known for: Fashion Photographer
- Spouse: Merrie A. Harris

Nathaniel Kramer (born 1961) is a film director, director of photography and cinematographer, as well as a fashion photographer, film producer, and documentary film director.

== Work ==
Kramer's photography has appeared in catalogs and advertisements for Gap, Reebok, Hanes, Ray Ban, J Crew, Talbots, Macy's, and Cover Girl. As well as in magazines such as GQ, Glamour, Lei, Vogue, Mademoiselle, Elle, Marie Claire, and New York, and has recently been shown in New York exhibitions.

Kramer won a Tony Award for Best Revival of a Play and a Drama Desk Award for Outstanding Revival of a Play for producing the 1998 revival of Arthur Miller's A View From the Bridge. In 1995, he produced the film Monster Mash, 1993's Emmy-nominated Choices, with Laurence Fishburne and Martin Sheen. In 2010, he produced, directed, and photographed the documentary film A LONG HAUL about a fisherman in Montauk, NY, which was an official selection at several film festivals. In 2011, he directed the feature-length sequel Where Have All the Mermaids Gone?, which was nominated for best feature documentary at the Madrid International Film Festival and the Austin Film Festival. Also among his director of photography and film producer credits are Willa, a film based on a short story by Stephen King, and In the Shadow of the Water Tower, a film by the experimental filmmaker Lewis Smithingham. He has also been the director of photography on several music videos, including videos for Slaine, Goldie and the Casualties.
