= It Was I =

1959 song performed by Skip & Flip

Single by Skip & Flip
- B-side: "Lunch Hour"
- Released: May 1959
- Genre: Rock and roll
- Length: 2:15
- Label: Brent
- Songwriter: Gary S. Paxton

Skip & Flip singles chronology
"It Was I" (1959)	"Fancy Nancy" (1959)

"It Was I" is a 1959 song written by vocalist Gary S. Paxton when he released it as part of a duo with Clyde Battin called Skip & Flip. "It Was I" reached No. 11 on the Billboard Hot 100 and ranked No. 84 on Billboard magazine's Top Hot 100 songs of 1959.

== Skip & Flip recording ==
Paxton had dropped out of high school and was living in Phoenix, Arizona when he wrote "It Was I" with Battin. The two of them recorded an acoustic demo of the song and submitted it to producer Bob Shad. Shortly after the song was release as a single, Paxton overheard "It Was I" playing from a radio speaker while he was working in a pecan tree. Paxton only realized the song was his after he rushed over to a parked car to take a closer listen. "It Was I" eventually sold over one million copies.

=== Chart performance ===
Chart (1959)	Peak position
US Billboard Hot 100	11

== Lindsey Buckingham recording ==
"It Was I"

Single by Lindsey Buckingham

from the album Law and Order
- Released: 1982
- Recorded: 1981
- Length: 2:39
- Label: Asylum/Warner Music Group
- Songwriter: Gary S. Paxton
- Producers: Lindsey Buckingham; Richard Dashut

Lindsey Buckingham singles chronology
"Trouble" (1981)	"It Was I" (1982)	"Holiday Road" (1983)

The song was later covered by American guitarist and vocalist Lindsey Buckingham, and was released as the second single off his debut album, Law and Order. Buckingham was still a member of Fleetwood Mac at the time, which was on hiatus after the conclusion of their Tusk Tour. A music video directed by Jerry Watson was also created to accompany the song.

The song featured the involvement of Carol Ann Harris, who was in a romantic relationship with Buckingham at the time of the song's recording. According to Harris, Buckingham initiated the collaboration by giving her a recording of Skip & Flip's version and asked her to learn the lyrics vocal melody over the course of a few days. She initially objected to the idea, believing that she would "sound like a little kid" on the recording; Buckingham maintained that he wanted to involve her in some capacity on his first solo album. Upon listening to "It Was I", Harris found the song "very catchy" but requested that he find someone else to it sing with him, which Buckingham rejected, explaining that he wanted her to have some involvement on the album. Harris said that she found the recording process to be an enjoyable experience and recalled receiving notes of congratulations from the members of Fleetwood Mac for her recording debut.

In an interview with Jim Ladd, Buckingham described "It Was I" as having an adolescent theme to its lyrics. "It's about someone who's probably first experiencing pain in a relationship and he's explaining what has gone wrong, but his conclusion at the end is one of commitment still...The sense is really very optimistic for future happiness."

=== Release and reception ===
Unlike Buckingham's previous single "Trouble", "It Was I" was not a big hit for Buckingham and it also failed to match the success of the original Skip & Flip recording. The song reached No. 10 on the Billboard Bubbling Under chart, an extension to the Hot 100.

"It Was I" fared slightly better in Australia, where it managed to reach the No. 74 spot and performed better than any of Buckingham's subsequent singles, including "Go Insane", which reached No. 100.

In a review for Creem magazine, Gene Sculatti said that Buckingham's rendition was "positively addictive" and "proves the absolute immortality and endless applicability of stupid, r&r lyrics." Record World called the song a "cute pop-rocker" and felt that Buckingham's "affected vocal phrasing" was "a cinch on pop radio".

=== Personnel ===
- Lindsey Buckingham – lead vocals, all instrumentation
- Carol Ann Harris – backing vocals

=== Chart performance ===
Chart (1982)	Peak position
Australia (Kent Music Report)	74
US Billboard Bubbling Under Hot 100 Singles	10
