= Anthology (music venue) =

Coordinates: 32°43′10.18″N 117°10′5.17″W

- Interactive map of Anthology
- Location: San Diego, California
- Type: Music venue & Restaurant

Construction
- Opened: 2007

Anthology was a 13,000 square foot, 325-seat live music venue and fine dining restaurant located at the south end of the Little Italy neighborhood of San Diego, California. It opened in summer 2007 and captured a modern feel of supper clubs of the 1930s and 40s in downtown San Diego. With a cost of over $6.5 million to build, including over $1 million spent on sound engineering, acoustics, and state of the art audio and video equipment, this venue quickly garnered national and international attention, and was considered by many of the Grammy award winning artists that played there to be one of the finest venues in the world to play in.

In addition, over 10 Emmy nominations were presented to Anthology during its tenure for its raw footage production of its concerts (see Anthology YouTube videos on Anthology website), an unprecedented occurrence for any music venue in the United States.

Anthology closed abruptly in January 2013 because of a divorce between the owners, and was eventually sold to a Los Angeles restaurant and entertainment conglomerate.

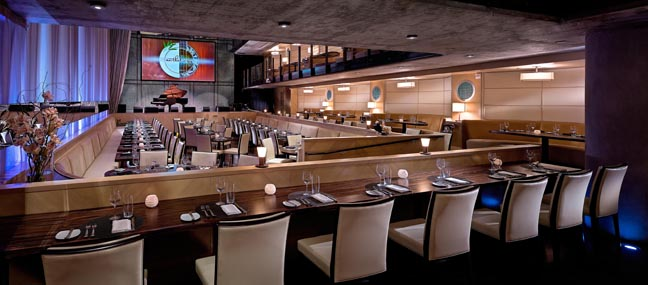
Photo taken from in front of Anthology's Bar displaying their main seating area

== Venue ==
While it started primarily as a jazz venue, Anthology typically featured an eclectic mix of jazz, rock, blues, Latin, Indie, classical and singer/songwriter acts. Artists were often national recording artists as well as numerous Grammy award winning artists. The building in which Anthology was housed, Metro Works, was developed by Howard Berkson. The architects were San Francisco-based company "BCV Architects." It was then sound engineered by Charles M. Slater Associates Inc. "CSA designed the state-of-the-art audiovisual and $1 million digital sound systems for Anthology... The 325-seat, 3 story, 13,000 square foot space features a mezzanine and 30-foot high ceilings."

== Closure ==
On January 4, 2013, Anthology closed its doors abruptly, with owners Howard and Marsha Berkson terminating their management team and the entire staff. The marketing manager announced that Anthology "has officially closed its doors and will not be reopening." On March 14, 2013, the real estate that housed Anthology was sold to new owners, who then filed for Chapter 11 bankruptcy protection. Anthology was a tenant, and was not part of the Chapter 11 bankruptcy filing by the new owners of the real estate. The owners of the real estate terminated Anthology's lease. Howard Berkson continues to own the Anthology brand and its intellectual property rights. An auction of the property and assets, originally scheduled for March 15, was postponed until April 2.

== Awards ==
- 2008 Sign on San Diego’s Best Upscale Bar
- 2008 Orchid Architectural Award
- 2008 California Restaurant Association Gold Medallion Award for Best Live Music Venue & Restaurant
- 2010 Two Emmy Nominations for Brad Gardner doing Composite Audio at Anthology and composite directing of a live tape at Anthology
- 2010 California Restaurant Association Gold Medallion Award for Best Live Music Venue & Restaurant & Lounge
- 2011 Four Emmy nominations for Brad Gardner doing Composite Audio of Anthology, Composite Audio of Hiroshima Live at Anthology, Composite directing of a live tape at Anthology, Live Directing of Hiroshima Live at Anthology
- 2011 Emmy for "Director Program - Live or Live to Tape" for "Hiroshima Live"
- 2011 California Restaurant Association Gold Medallion Award for Best Live Music Venue & Restaurant & Lounge
