= Bobby Pickett =

American singer-songwriter and comedian (1938–2007)

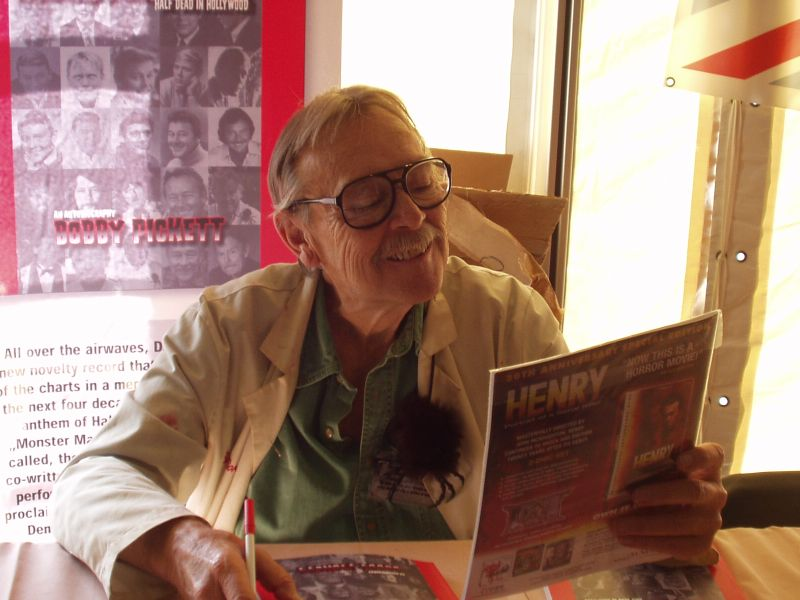
- Pickett in 2005

Background information
- Also known as: Bobby Boris Pickett
- Born: Robert George Pickett; February 11, 1938; Somerville, Massachusetts, U.S.
- Died: April 25, 2007 (aged 69) Los Angeles, California, U.S.
- Genres: Novelty; comedy
- Occupations: Singer; writer; comedian
- Instrument: Vocals
- Years active: 1959–2007
- Label: Garpax

Robert George Pickett (February 11, 1938 – April 25, 2007), better known as Bobby "Boris" Pickett, was an American singer-songwriter and comedian. He is best known for co-writing and performing the 1962 smash hit novelty song "Monster Mash".

Born in Somerville, Massachusetts, Pickett watched many horror films as a result of his father's position as a local movie theater manager. He started improvising impressions of Hollywood film stars at a young age. At a turning point in his career, Pickett was a vocalist for a local swing band called Darren Bailes and the Wolf Eaters. He would later serve in the United States Army.

He co-wrote his signature song, "Monster Mash", with Leonard Capizzi in May 1962 as a spoof of popular contemporary dance crazes. Pickett's performances include impersonations of Boris Karloff and Bela Lugosi, and although many major labels declined to distribute the song, Gary S. Paxton agreed to release it in the United States. "Monster Mash" was met with instant success and peaked at number one on the US Billboard Hot 100 for two weeks in October 1962, including Halloween. The song was certified gold by the RIAA on August 28, 1973. The song re-charted in 1970 and 1973 (when it reached the Top Ten), and since 2021 has regularly returned to the chart around Halloween.

Though Pickett never achieved the same success as he did with "Monster Mash" on charts, he continued to lend his voice to further parodies and other songs throughout the rest of his life. Pickett also made appearances on television, film, and radio as a guest star, narrator, actor, and disc jockey. He released Monster Mash: Half Dead in Hollywood, an autobiography, in 2005. Pickett died of leukemia on April 25, 2007, at age 69.

== Early life ==
Robert George Pickett was born in Somerville, Massachusetts, on February 11, 1938. His family lived in the Winter Hill neighborhood, and he attended Somerville High School. Through his father's movie theater business, Pickett was introduced to horror films such as Dracula and Frankenstein, both from 1931. Pickett served in the United States Army from March 9, 1956, to March 13, 1959, and was stationed in South Korea.

== Music career ==
=== Early music career ===
An aspiring actor, Pickett began his music career as a vocalist for a local swing band, Darren Bailes and the Wolf Eaters. During one performance, Pickett delivered a monologue in the style of Boris Karloff, an impression he would use later in his career.

=== "Monster Mash" and commercial success ===
Pickett co-wrote "Monster Mash" with Leonard Capizzi in May 1962. The song is a spoof on the dance crazes popular at the time, including the Twist and the Mashed Potato, which inspired the title. The song features Pickett's impersonations of veteran horror stars Boris Karloff and Bela Lugosi (the latter with the line "Whatever happened to my Transylvania Twist?"). Every major record label declined the song, but after hearing it, Gary S. Paxton agreed to produce and engineer it. Issued on Paxton's Garpax Records, the single became a million-seller, reaching number one on the Billboard Hot 100 chart for two weeks before Halloween in 1962. It was styled as being by "Bobby (Boris) Pickett and the Crypt-Kickers".

The track re-entered the U.S. charts twice, in August 1970, and again in May 1973, when it reached the number 10 spot. In the United Kingdom it took until October 1973 for the tune to become popular, peaking at number three in the UK Singles Chart. For the second time, the record sold over one million copies. The tune remains a Halloween perennial on radio and on iTunes.

=== Further parodies ===
A Christmas-themed follow-up, "Monsters' Holiday", (with "Monster Motion" on the B side) was also released in 1962 and reached number 30 in December that year. "Blood Bank Blues" (with "Me and My Mummy" on the B side) did not chart. This was followed by further monster-themed recordings such as the album The Original Monster Mash and such singles as "Werewolf Watusi" and "The Monster Swim", the latter of which made it to number 135 on the Bubbling Under chart and was credited under "Bobby Pickett and The Rolling Bones".

In 1973, Pickett re-recorded "Me and My Mummy" for a Metromedia 45, but it did not chart. Another of Pickett's songs, "Graduation Day", made number 80 in June 1963.

In 1975, Pickett recorded a novelty parody on Star Trek called "Star Drek" with Peter Ferrara, again performing some of the various voices, which was played on Dr. Demento's radio show for many years. He also performed a duet with Ferrara in 1976 titled "King Kong (Your Song)" spoofing the King Kong remake released that year.

In October 1984, Easy Street Records (Note: Not affiliated with the record store of the same name) released "Monster Rap", which lyrically continues the story of "Monster Mash" and features vocals by Bobby Payne as a monster who speaks in rap form and Pickett reprising his roles as the mad scientist and Dracula.

In 1993, Pickett wrote and performed "It's Alive", another sequel of sorts to the original "Mash" song. It did not chart but was played occasionally on the Demento show.

In 2004 and 2005, Pickett provided vocals for two Flash cartoons, "Monster Slash" and "Climate Mash", featuring new versions of his hit single. The cartoons protested inaction on the United States government's part towards deforestation and global warming.

=== Record label venture ===
In 1962, it was reported in the December 1 issue of Cashbox that Pickett along with Ned Ormand and R.B. Chris Christensen had formed Nico Records. Christensen had been a partner and professional manager in Buck Owens' Bluebook Music Publishing co. They had acquired an instrumental from the Daco label which was to be their first release. The instrumental was by The Revels of "Church Key" and "Six Pak" fame.

== Film and writing career ==
In 1967, Pickett and television writer Sheldon Allman wrote the musical I'm Sorry the Bridge Is Out, You'll Have to Spend the Night. It has been produced by local theaters around the United States. They followed it with another musical, Frankenstein Unbound. In 1995, the co-writers of Pixar's Toy Story, Joel Cohen and Alec Sokolow, produced a movie of it, originally titled Frankenstein Sings, but later released in the United States as Monster Mash: The Movie. Pickett starred in it with Candace Cameron, Jimmie Walker, Mink Stole, John Kassir, Sarah Douglas, Anthony Crivello, Adam Shankman and Carrie Ann Inaba. On ABC-TV, he appeared on a segment of The Long Hot Summer, with Roy Thinnes and Nancy Malone, on January 26, 1966.

In 1962 or 1963, Pickett also hosted a weekly disc jockey show on KRLA in Los Angeles.

In 1965, he appeared in several episodes of the sitcom Petticoat Junction as either Walter Thorp or Stonewall Jackson.

Pickett appeared in films in several classic genres: beach movie, It's a Bikini World (1967); biker, Chrome and Hot Leather (1971); horror, Deathmaster (1972) and the sci-fi comedy film, Lobster Man from Mars (1989).

Pickett appeared in such roles as Archie Bunker as part of a stage comedy revue about television, presented in Boston, titled Don't Touch That Dial.

In 1991, he appeared as a guest on the television show Beyond Vaudeville.

In 2004, Pickett served as the narrator of the children's film Spookley the Square Pumpkin.

In 2005, Pickett published his autobiography through Trafford Publishing, titled Monster Mash: Half Dead in Hollywood.

For many years, Pickett performed for Barry Scott's radio show The Lost 45s during its annual Halloween show in the Boston area.

== Death ==
On April 25, 2007, Pickett died in Los Angeles from leukemia at age 69. The May 13, 2007, episode of the Dr. Demento show featured a documentary retrospective of Pickett's work.

== Discography ==
=== Studio albums ===
List of studio albums, with selected chart positions and certifications
Title	Album details	Peak chart positions		Certifications
Title	Album details	US	CAN	Certifications
The Original Monster Mash	Released: 1962; Label: Garpax Records	97	71	
The Hollyweird Squares (with Bob Hudson, as Hudson & Pickett)	Released: 1976; Label: Dore Records	—	—	

=== Singles ===
Title (A-side/B-side)	Year	Peak chart positions			Certifications	Album
Title (A-side/B-side)	Year	US	UK	Bubbling Under	Certifications	Album
"The Monster Mash"	1962	1	3	-	Gold	The Original Monster Mash
"Monsters' Holiday"	1962	30	-	-	-	The Original Monster Mash
"Graduation Day" "The Humpty Dumpty"	1963	80	-	-	-	non-album singles
"Simon the Sensible Surfer"	1963	-	-	-	-	non-album singles
"The Monster Swim"	1964	-	-	135	-	non-album singles
"Werewolf Watusi"	1964	-	-	-	-	non-album singles
"Blood Bank Blues" "Me and My Mummy"	1965	-	-	-	-	non-album singles
"Wake Up My Mind"	1965	-	-	-	-	non-album singles
"Monster Man Jam"	1970	-	-	-	-	non-album singles
"Monster Concert" "Am I"	1973	-	-	-	-	non-album singles
"Me and My Mummy"(Reissue)	1973	-	-	-	-	non-album singles
"Star Drek" (featuring Peter Ferrara)	1976	-	-	-	-	non-album singles
"Sky High Market" (with Bob Hudson)	1976	-	-	-	-	The Hollyweird Squares
"King Kong (Your Song)" (with Peter Ferrara)	1976	-	-	107	-	non-album singles
"Monster Rap" (featuring Bobby Paine)	1984	-	-	-	-	non-album singles
"It's Alive"	1993	-	-	-	-	non-album singles

== Filmography ==
=== Television ===
Year	Title	Role	Notes
1962–1973	American Bandstand	Himself	three episodes
1963	Dr. Kildare	Extern	one episode
1963	Celebrity Party	Himself	television special
1964	The Lieutenant	Alvin Hopgood	one episode
1964	Monster Mash	Himself	television special
1964–1965	The Lloyd Thaxton Show	Himself	two episodes
1965	12 O'Clock High	G. I. Patient	one episode
1965	Hollywood Discotheque	Himself	two episodes
1965–1966	Petticoat Junction	Walter Thorp / Stonewall Jackson	two episodes
1966	The Long, Hot Summer	Fred Grady	one episode
1967	The Beverly Hillbillies	Lieutenant	one episode
1969	Bonanza	Gibosn	one episode
1973	Top of the Pops	Himself	Two episodes; Credited as Bobby 'Boris' Pickett and the Crypt Kickers
1982	T. J. Hooker	Charlie Brubaker	one episode
1991	Dr. Demento 20th Anniversary	Himself	television movie
1991	Beyond Vaudeville	Himself	One episode; Credited as Bobby 'Boris' Pickett
1991	Halloween Monster Bash	Himself	Television special; Credited as Bobby 'Boris' Pickett
1992	The Horror Hall of Fame III	Himself	television special
2021	The Spookley Holiday Show	Slim Pick-It	One episode; Posthumous release; Credited as Bobby 'Boris' Pickett

=== Film ===
Year	Title	Role	Notes
1967	It's a Bikini World	Woody	credited as Bob Pickett
1969	Three's a Crowd	Roy Dodson	credited as Bob Pickett
1970	The Baby Maker	Dr. Sims	credited as Bob Pickett
1971	Chrome and Hot Leather	Sweet Willy	credited as Bob Pickett
1972	Deathmaster	Kirkwood	credited as Bob Pickett
1982	Splitz	Chef	
1983	Strange Invaders	Editor	
1986	Hot Money	Stewart	
1987	Sister, Sister	Roger	
1988	Frankenstein General Hospital	Man in Elevator	credited as Bobby "Boris" Pickett
1989	Lobster Man from Mars	The Astrologer / King of Mars	
1994	Spooky World	Himself	credited as Bobby 'Boris' Pickett
1995	Monster Mash	Dr. Victor Frankenstein	also writer
2003	Boogie with the Undead	The Manager	
2006	The Witch's Dungeon: 40 Years of Chills	Himself	
2008	The Boneyard Collection	The Manager	Archived footage from Boogie with the Undead (2003); Posthumous release; Credited as Bobby 'Boris' Pickett

Taken from IMDb
