= Gary S. Paxton =

American record producer, recording artist, and songwriter (1939–2016)

- Paxton backstage at the Country Gospel Music Awards in 2007

Background information
- Born: Larry Wayne Stevens; May 18, 1939; Coffeyville, Kansas, U.S.
- Died: July 17, 2016 (aged 77) Branson, Missouri, U.S.
- Genres: Novelty music, country, gospel
- Occupations: Musician, songwriter, record producer
- Instrument: Vocalist
- Years active: 1959–2016
- Labels: Garpax, G.S.P., NewPax, RCA

Gary Sanford Paxton (born Larry Wayne Stevens; May 18, 1939 – July 17, 2016) was an American record producer, recording artist, and Grammy and Dove Award winning songwriter. Paxton was a member of Skip & Flip and the Hollywood Argyles and was the producer of two number one Billboard Hot 100 singles, "Alley Oop" for the Hollywood Argyles in 1960 and "Monster Mash" for Bobby "Boris" Pickett in 1962.

== Biography ==
Born in Coffeyville, Kansas to an unmarried teenage mother and initially named Larry Wayne Stevens, Paxton was adopted at age three, given a new name, and raised in rural poverty on a farm. He endured a troubled childhood, molested at age seven and afflicted by spinal meningitis at 11, which left him crippled for three years. His family moved to Arizona when he was 12, and he started his first band by 14, playing country and rock 'n' roll. He spent his middle teenage years touring the American Southwest with this and other forgotten bands.

Early stardom came as "Flip" in the pop duo Skip & Flip (with Clyde "Skip" Battin), courtesy of a million-selling 1959 smash the two cut in Phoenix, Arizona, "It Was I". In what became a pattern in Paxton's early career, the song was recorded first and the group assembled second: after successfully shopping their demo to a label owner, Gary became "Flip" and Clyde became "Skip", after the man's pet poodles, a "group" put together just to have a name on the record. According to Paxton, he was picking cherries on an Oregon farm when he heard the song on a transistor radio and realized it had become a hit. The duo made television appearances, toured with superstar deejay Alan "Moondog" Freed, and soon followed their success with another hit, "Cherry Pie". After this second chart appearance, the pair split up.

By 1960, Paxton was living in Hollywood, California, and was involved in a number of projects, collaborating with others as a performer, writer, producer, label owner, and audio engineer. He played a major role in the making of two novelty hits in the early 1960s and worked with artists including the Association, Paul Revere & the Raiders, the Four Freshmen, and Tommy Roe.

His work throughout this early-1960s period is scattered over various labels, mostly his own (first "Garpax" and quickly followed up with "G.S.P. Records") which he seemed to open and close on a constant basis, making regular use of the five studios he owned.

Over the years, Paxton built a reputation as an eccentric figure in the recording industry. Brian Wilson was known to admire his talents, and Phil Spector to fear him.

His creativity and knack for promotion were legendary, but could also run to excess: once, after a local radio station dismissed one of his records ("Elephant Game (Part One)" by Renfro & Jackson) as "too black", he assembled a protest parade down Hollywood Boulevard in Los Angeles, California, consisting of 15 cheerleaders and a live elephant pulling a Volkswagen convertible. He was arrested after the elephant got scared and began to defecate in the street.

In the later 1960s, he gradually turned to the burgeoning Bakersfield sound in country music. By 1967, he had relocated entirely to that city, where he ran a variety of businesses and founded the label Bakersfield International. He moved on to Nashville, Tennessee, in 1970, and in 1971, following his partner's suicide and his own long struggles with drugs and alcohol, he converted to Christianity. He turned his talents to gospel music, becoming part of the hippie countercultural Jesus movement, and worked in gospel ever since, while maintaining an interest in country. Paxton recorded many of his country and gospel albums under the "Rusty Dean" alias.

On December 29, 1980, Paxton was shot three times by hitmen, who were allegedly hired by Vern Gosdin, a country singer he was producing. The incident nearly ended his life, and took him out of the music world for eight years. After the trial, he visited the men in prison and forgave them. Paxton left Nashville in 1999 and lived in Branson, Missouri, with his fourth wife, Vicki Sue Roberts. He suffered from hepatitis C and almost died from the disease in 1990. Paxton made it very clear that his name is Gary S. Paxton, not "Gary Paxton". In the 2000s, Paxton became associated with a number of performers working in Branson, Missouri, including former members of Bill Haley and His Comets who, as The Comets, recorded a single produced by Paxton, who was credited as "Grandpa Rock"; the single was entitled "When I Die, Just Bury Me at Wal-Mart (So My Wife Will Come and Visit Me)".

Paxton died at his home in Branson on July 17, 2016, at the age of 77 from complications of heart surgery and liver disease.

== Recordings ==
Beyond his early work as part of Skip & Flip, Paxton is best known for his involvement in two novelty hits: the 1960 No. 1 smash "Alley Oop" — written by Dallas Frazier and cut quickly with a group thrown together by Paxton's roommate Kim Fowley, the Hollywood Argyles — and a 1962 No. 1 hit inspired by the Mashed Potato dance craze, "Monster Mash", which Paxton produced and recorded with its author Bobby "Boris" Pickett and another assembled group billed as the Cryptkickers.

In 1965, he produced "Sweet Pea", a hit for Tommy Roe, and engineered "Along Comes Mary", a hit for the Association, winning a Grammy nomination in engineering for his efforts. The following year, he engineered another hit for the Association, "Cherish", and another for Roe, "Hooray for Hazel". As Paxton moved toward the Bakersfield sound in the late 1960s, he scored his first country hit in 1967 with "Hangin' On" by the Gosdin Brothers.

In the wake of his conversion to Christianity, Paxton focused his efforts on gospel music. He still kept one foot in the world of secular country during the early 1970s — writing and producing "Woman (Sensuous Woman)" for Don Gibson (a Grammy nominee and a million-plus seller in three different versions) along with two other country-chart hits, and at one point signing with RCA Records as a solo country artist — but gospel was now his chief priority. In 1973 he wrote and produced "L-O-V-E" for the Blackwood Brothers, who took home the Grammy for Best Gospel Performance. In 1975, Paxton won the Best Inspirational Grammy for his album The Astonishing, Outrageous, Amazing, Incredible, Unbelievable, Different World of Gary S. Paxton, which contained his oft-recorded devotional song "He Was There All the Time". Appearing on his gospel album covers in a halo of facial hair and a tall-top cowboy hat, Paxton infused his religious work with the same eccentricity, individuality, and hippie humor that had characterized his 60s material in Los Angeles: acting the role of the Jesus freak, likening himself to "an armpit in the body of Christ", and crafting song titles like "When the Meat Wagon Comes for You", "Will There Be Hippies in Heaven?", "I'm a Fool for Christ (Whose Fool Are You?)", and "Jesus Is My Lawyer in Heaven".

Paxton's gospel work was released through NewPax Records, another in his long series of labels, founded in 1975 as an outlet for his new ideas in songwriting and engineering. The label also released recordings by other Christian acts, including the Christian alternative rock band Daniel Amos, who released their albums ¡Alarma! and Doppelgänger through the label in the early 1980s. NewPax was closely linked with Paragon Associates, with which it eventually merged. Paxton was inducted into the Country Gospel Music Hall of Fame in 1999 on the basis of his innovation and accomplishments in the field and his production and writing for numerous noted artists in the industry.

== Discography ==
=== Studio albums ===
- 1975 - The Astonishing, Outrageous, Amazing, Incredible, Unbelievable, Different World of Gary S. Paxton
- 1977 - More from the Astonishing, Outrageous, Amazing, Incredible, Unbelievable Gary S. Paxton
- 1978 - Terminally Weird/But Godly Right
- 1979 - Gary Sanford Paxton
- 1979 - The Gospel According to Gary S.

=== Compilations ===
- 1980 - (Some Of) The Best Of Gary S. Paxton (So Far)
- 2006 - Hollywood Maverick: the Gary S. Paxton Story
- 2009 - "Grandpa Rock, Volume 1" - 50 years of Gary S. Paxton hits.
- 2011 - "Vote 'Em Out Boogie" - LuPax CDs. Duet with Jim Lusk.
- 2014 - "AARP Blues" - LuPax CD's. Duet with Jim Lusk.
