= Alley Oop (song) =

1960 single by The Hollywood Argyles

Single by the Hollywood Argyles
- B-side: "Sho' Know a Lot About Love"
- Released: May 1960
- Recorded: 1960
- Genre: Rock and roll, doo-wop, novelty
- Length: 2:36
- Label: Lute 5905
- Songwriter: Dallas Frazier
- Producers: Gary S. Paxton; Kim Fowley

The Hollywood Argyles singles chronology
"Alley Oop" (1960)	"Gun Totin' Critter Named Jack" (1960)

"Alley Oop"

Song by The Beach Boys

from the album Beach Boys' Party!
- Released: November 8, 1965
- Recorded: September 16, 1965
- Studio: Western, Hollywood
- Genre: Rock and roll
- Length: 2:56
- Label: Capitol
- Songwriter: Dallas Frazier
- Producer: Brian Wilson

"Alley Oop" is a song written and composed by Dallas Frazier in 1957. The song was inspired by the V. T. Hamlin-created comic strip of the same name.

== The Hollywood Argyles ==
The Hollywood Argyles, a short-lived studio band, recorded the song in 1960, and it reached #1 on the Billboard Hot 100 and #3 on the US R&B chart. It also went to #24 on the UK chart. It was produced by Gary Paxton, who also sang lead vocals. At the time, Paxton was under contract to Brent Records, where he recorded as Flip of Skip & Flip.

According to Paxton:

There were NO Hollywood Argyles at the very beginning. I was the only lead singer. Kim Fowley helped me produce it, because we were partners in Maverick Music International/BMI at the time... The drummer was Ronnie Silico (Lloyd Price's road drummer). The piano player was Gaynel Hodge of the Penguins. The bass player was Harper Cosby, a jazz bassist in L.A. Sandy Nelson (of "Teenbeat" fame) played the garbage can and screamed on the record. The background singers were: Dallas Frazier...Buddy Mize, Scotty Turner, Diane ?? (A friend I knew), and [myself]. It was recorded at Richard Podolor’s American Recorders, next door to Lawrence Welk's Palladium, and across from the Moulin Rouge on Sunset Blvd. near Sunset and Vine Street. A little bitty street (Argyle Street) was next door to the studio, so I said, "Let's call ourselves The Hollywood Argyles!"

== Other versions ==
Also in 1960, Dante & the Evergreens released a version that went to #15 on the Billboard Hot 100, while The Dyna-Sores released a version that went to #59 on the same chart. Both Dante & The Evergreens' and The Hollywood Argyles' versions were credited as number ones in Cash Box magazine's singles chart.

The Pre-Historics released a version called "Alley Oop Cha-Cha-Cha" in 1960, with Gary Paxton (who had performed lead vocals on the Hollywood Argyles' version) and Skip Battin performing backing vocals. The Beach Boys recorded and released their version on their 1965 album Beach Boys' Party! The Kingsmen used the melody of "Alley Oop" for their song "Annie Fanny" (U.S. #47, 1965).

A British satirical art rock/pop group, The Bonzo Dog Doo-Dah Band, recorded a version of "Alley Oop," which was released as their second single in October 1966. The song's composer, Dallas Frazier, released his own version on his 1966 album Elvira. It was also performed by Dave Van Ronk and the Hudson Dusters on their self-titled album, released in 1967. The British group The Tremeloes recorded a version of the song as well. There is a Brazilian Portuguese-language version of the song, titled "Brucutu", recorded by Roberto Carlos in 1965, with lyrics by Rossini Pinto.

Sha Na Na did a version of the song in a prehistoric-themed sketch on their TV show. Actress-singer Darlene Love recorded a version of the song for the 1984 film Bachelor Party. George Thorogood also performed a version of this song with his band, the Destroyers, and it was on his live album that was released on February 15, 1989. Ray Stevens's version was on his album Gitarzan.

The lyric "look at that caveman go" is referenced in David Bowie's "Life on Mars" from the album Hunky Dory. Marc Bolan's "Truck On (Tyke)" references Paxton's pronunciation of the word 'dinosaur' in its second verse line "I'm a space age cowboy, ride dinosaurs..."

== Use in pro wrestling ==
In the late 1970s in the Memphis, TN-based CWA wrestling promotion, there was a wrestler on their roster named "Dream Machine" (local wrestler Troy Graham wearing a mask) and on one episode of the local Saturday morning CWA TV program, host Lance Russell showed a video of Dream Machine footage set to "Alley Oop". After the video, Russell chuckled about it, causing an angry Dream Machine to run out and start choking Russell. After Dream Machine was separated from Russell by his manager Jimmy Hart, CWA promoter Eddie Marlin fined Dream Machine and threatened to suspend him.

== Charts ==
Chart (1960)	Peak position
New Zealand (Lever Hit Parade)	1
UK Singles (Official Charts Company)	24
US Billboard Hot 100	1
US Hot R&B/Hip-Hop Songs (Billboard)	3

== See also ==
- List of Billboard Hot 100 number-one singles of 1960
