= Garpax Records =

American record label (1962–1965)

Garpax Records was an American record label, established by Gary S. Paxton, which first issued the song "Monster Mash" by Bobby "Boris" Pickett in 1962. It was distributed by London Records. The label lasted from 1962 to 1965.
