= Dallas Frazier =

American country musician and songwriter (1939–2022)

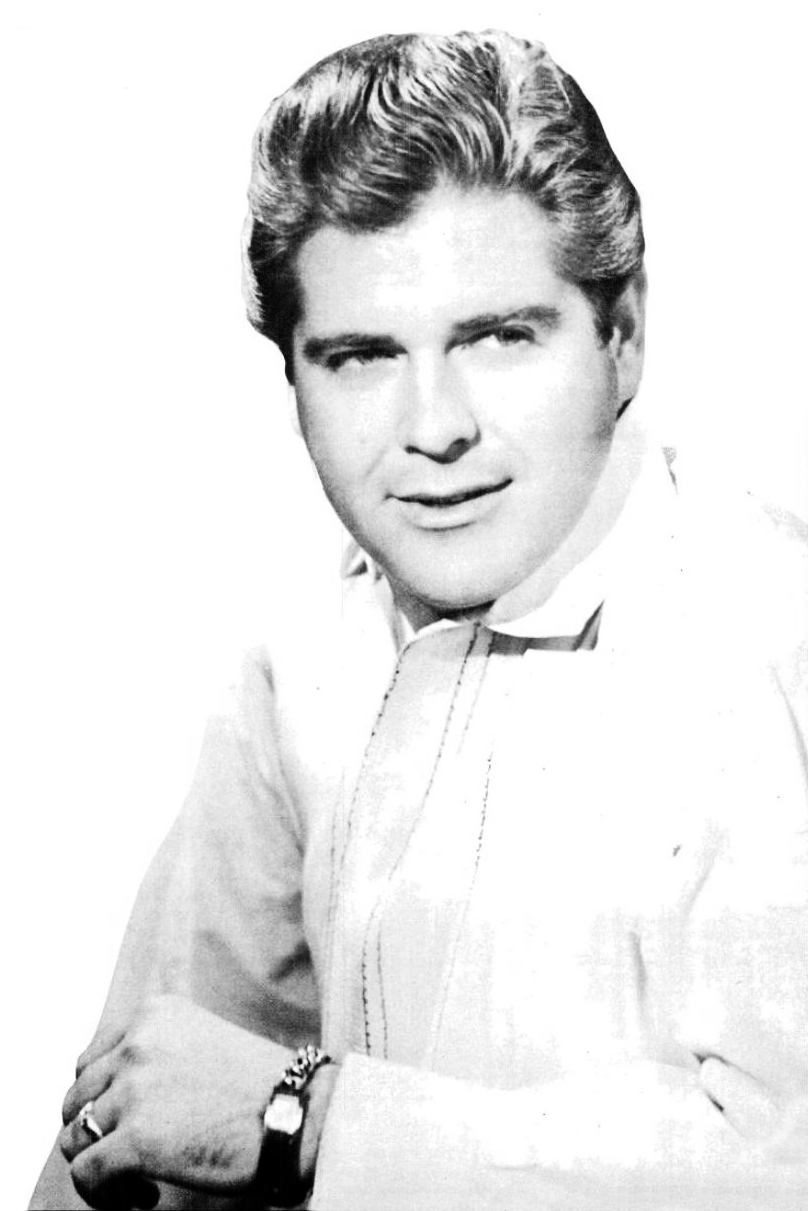
- Frazier in 1966

Background information
- Born: October 27, 1939; Spiro, Oklahoma, U.S.
- Died: January 14, 2022 (aged 82) Gallatin, Tennessee, U.S.
- Genres: Country
- Occupation: Singer-songwriter
- Instrument: Vocals
- Years active: 1954–1988
- Labels: Capitol, RCA

Dallas Frazier (October 27, 1939 – January 14, 2022) was an American country musician and songwriter who had success in the 1950s and 1960s.

== Life and career ==
Frazier was born in Spiro, Oklahoma, on October 27, 1939, but was raised in Bakersfield, California. As a teenager, he played with Ferlin Husky and on the program Hometown Jamboree; he released his first single, "Space Command", at age 14 in 1954. As he told writer Edd Hurt in a 2008 profile for the music website Perfect Sound Forever, "We were part of The Grapes of Wrath. We were the Okies who went out to California with mattresses tied on the tops of their Model A Fords. My folks were poor. At 12, I moved away from home, with my folks' permission. Ferlin [Husky] offered me a job, and I started working with him when I was 12. Then I recorded a side for Capitol Records when I was 14, and I did some country. I cut in the big circular building that's still out there on Hollywood and Vine."

Frazier's 1957 song "Alley Oop", later taken to number one in the US by the Hollywood Argyles, was his first hit. After Hometown Jamboree went off the air, Frazier moved to Nashville, Tennessee, and found work as a songwriter. Among his early successes was "Timber I'm Falling", a hit for Husky in 1964, and "There Goes My Everything", a big hit for Jack Greene in 1966 that earned him a nomination for the Grammy Award for Best Country Song.

In 1966, he released his solo debut album Elvira, containing his song "Elvira". His follow-up, Tell It Like It Is (1967), was also a success.

While his singing success was limited, Frazier became an oft-covered songwriter. His tunes were recorded by O.C. Smith, George Jones (who recorded an entire album of Frazier's songs in 1968), Diana Ross, Engelbert Humperdinck, Jerry Lee Lewis, Jack Greene, Connie Smith (who also recorded an entire album of Frazier's songs in 1972), Willie Nelson, Brenda Lee, Carola, Charley Pride, Waylon Jennings, Merle Haggard, Gene Watson, Elvis Presley, Moe Bandy, Roy Head, Charlie Louvin, Rodney Crowell, Dan McCafferty, Poco, and Ronnie Hawkins. In 1970, Frazier earned his second Grammy nomination for Best Country Song, which is awarded to the songwriter rather than the performer, for "All I Have to Offer You (Is Me), which became a number-one hit for Charley Pride. Many of the songs became hits into the 1980s; examples include the Oak Ridge Boys cover of "Elvira" and Emmylou Harris's version of "Beneath Still Waters". The cover of "Elvira" by the Oak Ridge Boys was a crossover hit, peaking at number one on Billboard's Hot Country Singles and Tracks chart and number five on the all-genre Billboard Hot 100, and earned Frazier his third Grammy nomination for Best Country song. Anne Murray with Glen Campbell, George Strait, Randy Travis, and Patty Loveless have all also recorded Frazier tunes. Frazier himself charted eight times on the U.S. country chart. He was inducted into the Nashville Songwriters Hall of Fame in 1976.

In 1988, Frazier left the music industry and became a minister. Frazier suffered two strokes in late 2021, and died from related complications at a care facility in Gallatin, Tennessee, on January 14, 2022, at the age of 82.

== Discography ==
=== Albums ===
Year	Album	Label
1966	Elvira	Capitol
1967	Tell It Like It Is	Capitol
1970	Singing My Songs	RCA Victor
1971	My Baby Packed Up My Mind and Left Me	RCA Victor

=== Singles ===
Year	Single	Chart Positions				Album
Year	Single	US Country	US	CAN Country	CAN	Album
1954	"Space Command"	—	—	—	—	single only
1966	"Elvira"	—	72	—	27	Elvira
1966	"Just a Little Bit of You"	—	108	—	—	Elvira
1966	"Especially for You"	—	—	—	—	Elvira
1967	"My Woman Up't and Gone"	—	—	—	—	Tell It Like It Is
1967	"Everybody Oughta Sing a Song"	28	—	23	—	singles only
1968	"The Sunshine of My World"	43	—	—	—	singles only
1968	"I Hope I Like Mexico Blues"	59	—	—	—	singles only
1969	"The Conspiracy of Homer Jones"	63	120	—	—	singles only
1969	"California Cotton Fields"	45	—	—	—	Singing My Songs
1970	"She Wants to Be Good"	—	—	—	—	Singing My Songs
1970	"The Birthmark Henry Thompson Talks About"	45	—	—	—	single only
1971	"Big Mable Murphy"	43	—	—	—	My Baby Packed Up My Mind and Left Me
1971	"My Baby Packed Up My Mind and Left Me"	—	—	—	—	My Baby Packed Up My Mind and Left Me
1971	"High Steppin' Mama"	—	—	—	—	singles only
1972	"North Carolina"	42	—	55	—	singles only
1973	"Let That Lonesome Fiddle Man Take the Lead"	—	—	—	—	singles only
