= The Toxic Waltz (song) =

Song by Exodus

from the album Fabulous Disaster
- Released: January 30, 1989
- Recorded: 1988
- Genre: Thrash metal
- Length: 4:51
- Label: Combat/Relativity Records
- Songwriter: Gary Holt
- Producers: Marc Senesac, Gary Holt, Rick Hunolt

"The Toxic Waltz" is a song by American thrash metal band Exodus, released from the band's third album Fabulous Disaster (1989). Although the song was never released as a single, it is one of Exodus' best-known songs and has held a regular position on their concert setlist since 1989.

== Writing and inspiration ==
The song's lyrics describe "the action in a violent mosh pit: blood on the floor, shots to the head, and general chaos." Frontman Steve "Zetro" Souza said in a 2014 interview with Songfacts that "The Toxic Waltz" was written after guitarist Gary Holt came to band practice, and asked him to write a song about "what fans do at [their] gigs." Souza commented:

So I was home that night and I saw an infomercial or one of those things. This was back in the '80s before they really had a lot of them. It was for some '50s and '60s Greatest Dance Songs compilation, and it had "The Twist", "The Mashed Potato", "The Watusi", everything you can think of, it had one of those songs. "The Stroll." Anything that had a song that had a dance to it, they did. And I thought, "Wow, good idea."

So I wrote the lyrics as a parody and I wrote it as a joke. I didn't even think that we were going to use it. If you read the lyrics, they're kind of silly. I'm thinking, you know, here we are, this totally hard thrash band, we kick in your face and rape and murder your wife, and now here we're writing a parody of a '60s or '50s dance number.

And then Gary read the lyrics and was, like, "These are brilliant, dude." I'm all, "No way. If we put this on there, they're going to kill us. Are you kidding? They're going to be flipping us off."

The songs lyrics were written in 25 minutes.

== Reception ==
The music video for "The Toxic Waltz" received regular rotation on MTV's Headbangers Ball. It was filmed at The Fillmore in San Francisco, directed by Daniel P. Rodriguez and produced by Brian Good for Antipodes Productions. In a retrospective article about the song Metal Hammer noted that it was a missed opportunity that the song wasn’t released as a single.

Despite Steve "Zetro" Souza initial hesitation about the song’s jocularity, he later revealed in 2020, that he had never met anyone who reacted to it in the way that he was expecting stating "nobody’s ever come up and said ‘I hate that song, it’s stupid’, For the thrashers it’s their anthem. Older people that bring their kids to the show will ask, ‘Are you playing The Toxic Waltz tonight?’ Or I’ll ask if someone’s mom listens to us, and they’ll say, ‘Well, she likes The Toxic Waltz…’ Maybe because it’s structured like a parody of a dance song, it’s more easily accessible."

"The Toxic Waltz" has become a fan favorite, and is one of the band's most famous live songs, being played at almost every Exodus concert since its debut live performance in 1989.

== Personnel ==
- Steve "Zetro" Souza – vocals
- Gary Holt – guitars
- Rick Hunolt – guitars
- Rob McKillop – bass
- Tom Hunting – drums
