= Compilation album =

Album comprising previously made music

A compilation album comprises tracks, which may be previously released or unreleased, usually from several separate recordings by either one performer or by several performers. If the recordings are from one artist, then generally the tracks were not originally intended for release together as a single work, but may be collected together as a greatest hits album or box set. If the recordings are from several artists, there may be a theme, topic, time period, or genre which links the tracks, or they may have been intended for release as a single work – such as a tribute album. When the tracks are by the same recording artist, the album may be referred to as a retrospective album or an anthology.

== Content and scope ==
Songs included on a compilation album may be previously released or unreleased, usually from several separate recordings by either one or several performers. If by one artist, then generally the tracks were not originally intended for release together as a single work, but may be collected together as a greatest hits album, singles album or box set. Compilation albums may employ traditional product bundling strategies.

According to sound technician Richard King, classical music compilations "may require more processing to match tracks coming from various sources and recording venues, as well as the different sizes of ensembles."

In Christgau's Record Guide: Rock Albums of the Seventies (1981), Robert Christgau said, "While compilation albums by album artists (as opposed to stylistically unified singles specialists) are often useless, sometimes they present themselves as events", citing as examples the 1971 Ray Charles LP A 25th Anniversary in Show Business Salute to Ray Charles, The Kink Kronikles (1972), and Changesonebowie (1976).

== Common types ==
Common types of compilation include:

- "Greatest hits", "best of", or "singles collection" LPs, gathering together an artist's or a group's best-known songs. If the artist or group continues to record, compilers commonly include one or more previously unreleased tracks as an incentive for fans to buy the album, even if they already have the other material on the compilation.
- Other single-artist compilations, such as rarities or B-side collections, albums compiled from radio sessions, songs performed by an artist exclusively for a film soundtrack or collections that combine multiple releases, such as LPs and EPs together on one or more compact discs. Such compilations generally target existing fans of the artist and have little mainstream appeal, though postmortem compilations of unreleased materials from recently deceased artists have significant popularity.
- Box sets, elaborate multi-disc collections, often covering the entire breadth of an artist's career or the full sweep of an entire record label or genre. Many anthologies are released in this format.
- Various artists themed compilations, e.g. love songs, Christmas songs, songs featuring a particular instrument (such as saxophone or piano), one-hit wonders, and countless other variations. This does not include original work by various artists for a new album or single, such as Phil Spector's A Christmas Gift for You from Phil Spector or Band-Aid's "Do They Know It's Christmas?".
- Various artists genre compilations, e.g. jazz, synth-pop or funk. These may be from the same time period (year, decade or era, for example), or may incorporate a common theme, as a soundtrack exemplifies well.
- Various artists hit compilations. This has been a very successful part of the album market since the early 1970s. Recent hit singles would be sourced, given an eye-catching name (e.g. "Power Hits '72!") and tightly packed on to a single vinyl LP with around ten tracks per side. This was achieved by truncating the songs with harsh edits, or through the grooves being closer together than the norm - frequently a combination of the two. Thus, while the album might live up to the title of "20 Mind Blowing Hits", they would not be the full-length full-quality releases the end listener expected. Released by budget record labels as means to make money from a small budget, they were treated with derision, jeer and disdain by audiophiles due to the brevity of each track and the poor dynamic range. By the 1980s, a double album with six or eight tracks on each side became the norm. Now that CDs are the dominant format, these compilations are usually released on one, two, or three CDs. As streaming became the dominant music format, hit compilations gave way to digital playlists of current hits.
- Promotional compilations or samplers. These are creative, successful forms of promotion for artists or record labels to promote their music. Generally, these types of releases are free or cost very little for the consumer or end listener. RCA Victor is credited with pioneering the concept of a sampling of a label's artists with its 1949 release Theme Songs. Elektra Records released several sampler albums in the 1950s. Columbia Records' Stars for a Summer Night sold over a half million copies in the summer of 1961.
- Private label promotional compilations. Promotional compilation CDs can be private labeled for products, retail outlets, or commercial organizations or non-profit organizations. Artists and labels like to co-brand themselves with well-known brands for marketing purposes, and transversely, well-known brands like to co-brand themselves with artists.
- Business-to-business promotional compilations. The music industry may use other types of promotional compilations within a business-to-business context to promote artists to media concerns (radio stations, music supervisors for TV, film or video games for synchronization).
- Composer/producer albums/record label. Many hip hop producers will release a compilation album which features various artists, but with each track composed by the same producer or it is under the same record label.
- Collaborative compilation albums. These are albums that have the theme of the artist or group collaborating on each track with different artists. Ed Sheeran's No.6 Collaborations Project and Jay-Z and Linkin Park's Collision Course are examples of this.

== Royalties ==
For multi-artist compilations, royalties are usually prorated. In most cases, each artist's per-record royalty rate (typically 12–14% in 1999) is divided by the number of artists on the album. Some record companies simplify the equation and pay a rounded-off rate, either as a percentage or as a set amount, regardless of the total number of artists on the record. As of 1999, these rates were around 0.5% to 1% or 15–16 cents per record. When a compilation album includes a track from a different record company, the royalties are split between the artist and the original record company. Unless specifically limited by a contract, record companies may release as many greatest hits albums by their recording artist as they wish without requiring the artist's agreement or permission.

== Charts ==
In the United Kingdom, the Official Charts Company compiles a weekly compilation albums chart, limited to various artists compilations and soundtrack compilations.

== See also ==
- Anthology (disambiguation) § Albums
- Double album
- List of punk rock compilation albums
- Mixtape
