= Impact Is Imminent =

Studio album by Exodus
- Released: July 10, 1990
- Recorded: December 1989 – January 1990
- Studios: Various: Music Grinder, Hollywood; Record Two Mendocino, Comptche; Alpha & Omega Recording, San Francisco; Record Plant, Los Angeles, California; Earwax Productions
- Genre: Thrash metal
- Length: 49:47
- Label: Capitol
- Producers: The H-Team (Gary Holt, Rick Hunolt)

Exodus chronology
Fabulous Disaster (1989)	Impact Is Imminent (1990)	Good Friendly Violent Fun (1991)

Impact Is Imminent is the fourth studio album by American thrash metal band Exodus, released on July 10, 1990. This was Exodus' first album on Capitol Records as well as their first album to feature John Tempesta on drums. It was also the last studio album to feature Rob McKillop on bass, though he appeared on their first live album, Good Friendly Violent Fun, which was recorded live in 1989 but not released until 1991. Impact Is Imminent was re-released in 2008 in a limited edition mini-album packaging to resemble the original vinyl release, including the inner sleeve.

== Tour ==
Exodus spent the latter half of 1990 touring in support of Impact Is Imminent. The band opened for funk rock act Red Hot Chili Peppers (who were labelmates with Exodus at the time) at The Kaiser Center in Oakland on July 21, 1990. Exodus was part of two major tours: in August 1990, they toured the U.S. with Suicidal Tendencies and Pantera, and three months later, they toured Europe with Flotsam and Jetsam, Vio-lence and Forbidden. The band wrapped up the tour on December 28, 1990 at The Fillmore. Exodus were supposed to open for Judas Priest on their Painkiller tour in Europe in early 1991, but due to financial issues, they were forced to withdraw from the tour and replaced by Pantera. The band was also reportedly offered, but turned down opening for Megadeth, Slayer and Anthrax on the North American leg of Clash of the Titans tour as a replacement for Death Angel, who were ultimately replaced by a then-lesser known Alice in Chains.

== Reception ==
Professional ratings
Review scores
Source	Rating
AllMusic	1.5/5 stars
Collector's Guide to Heavy Metal	7/10
Select	3/5 medals

Impact Is Imminent received a negative review from AllMusic's Eduardo Rivadavia, who called it "the most forgettable album of Exodus' career." Canadian journalist Martin Popoff appreciated Exodus' "adherence to an older, lost speed metal rant" and wrote that fans might want to come back and revisit songs that were quickly skipped in favour of more "pushier works".

Despite being released on a major label, Impact Is Imminent was not as successful as Fabulous Disaster and debuted at No. 137 on the Billboard 200, Exodus' lowest chart position to date. Until the release of Blood In, Blood Out in 2014, Impact Is Imminent would be Exodus' last album to enter the Billboard 200.

Guitarist Gary Holt expressed some regret for the album during the making of 2010’s Exhibit B: The Human Condition, stating that "if there was one album I could have back and record again it would be Impact." He went on to praise the album for having "some of the best riffs I've ever written."

Holt restated his opinion of the record during an April 2020 interview with Robb Flynn of Machine Head: "I listen back to Impact Is Imminent, and if there’s one album in my career I wish... I had it back, like it’d never been released, it’s that album, because it’s got some of the best riffs I ever wrote. I mean, the main riff to ‘Impact Is Imminent’ is my favorite riff I’ve ever written. It’s crazy, the string skipping, no one had ever done that shit."

== Track listing ==
All tracks are written by Exodus.

No.	Title	Length
1.	"Impact Is Imminent"	4:20
2.	"A.W.O.L."	5:44
3.	"The Lunatic Parade"	4:14
4.	"Within the Walls of Chaos"	7:45
5.	"Objection Overruled"	4:34
6.	"Only Death Decides"	6:07
7.	"Heads They Win (Tails You Lose)"	7:43
8.	"Changing of the Guard"	6:49
9.	"Thrash Under Pressure"	2:38
Total length:		49:54

== Personnel ==
Exodus

- Steve "Zetro" Souza – vocals
- Gary Holt – guitars
- Rick Hunolt – guitars
- Rob McKillop – bass
- John Tempesta – drums

Production

- Gary Holt – production
- Rick Hunolt – production
- Csaba Petocz – engineering
- John Bush, Lewis Demetri, Chris Fuhrman, Andy Newell, Jim McKee – additional engineering
- Steve Heinke, Lawrence Ethan, Shawna Stobie, Ulrich Wild, Casey McMackin, Manny Lacarrubba – assistant engineering
- Marc Senesac – mixing at Alpha & Omega
- Stephen Marcussen – mastering at Precision Mastering

== Charts ==
=== Album ===
Chart (1990)	Peak position
US Billboard 200	137
