= Let There Be Blood =

Studio album of re-recorded songs by Exodus
- Released: October 28, 2008
- Recorded: 2008
- Genre: Thrash metal
- Length: 45:42
- Label: Zaentz Records
- Producer: Gary Holt

Exodus chronology
| The Atrocity Exhibition... Exhibit A (2007) | Let There Be Blood (2008) | Exhibit B: The Human Condition (2010) |

Let There Be Blood is the ninth studio album by American thrash metal band Exodus. It is a re-record of their 1985 debut album Bonded by Blood. The only band members who play on both Bonded by Blood and Let There Be Blood are guitarist Gary Holt and drummer Tom Hunting. The track "Hell's Breath" originally appears on the "1983 Rehearsal" with Kirk Hammett and never was recorded officially.

== Background ==
According to vocalist Rob Dukes the band re recorded the album due to guitarist Gary Holt wanting to re due both the guitars and drums on the original.

Following the album’s release Holt stated in an interview:

It's something we've talked about for a long time. Ever since we did the first live album ['Another Lesson In Violence'], we always thought how cool it would be to give the album the benefits of modern technology. 'Bonded By Blood' is a classic, it's always going to be the greatest album we do, but we just wanted to record these songs, put this out on our own and share how relevant these songs still sound today. If you listen to the re-recording, they sound as up to date and current as anything anybody is putting out there now. That's a testament to how great the songs are."

The band remained faithful to the original arrangements, however Holt did admit that he did go slightly off subject on the leads.

== Reception ==
Professional ratings
Review scores
| Source | Rating |
|---|---|
| AllMusic | 3.5/5 stars |
| About.com | 3.5/5 stars |
| Ultimate Guitar | 10/10 |

Let There Be Blood has met mixed reviews. The musical quality of the album has been praised, but reviewers have questioned the need for such a re-make, with Cosmo Lee of Allmusic going so far as to accuse it of being a potential "cash-in" on the original album's legacy. However, Gary Holt has said that the band was not trying to replace the original, but rather wanted to give the songs "the benefit of modern production." In its first week of release, Let There Be Blood sold 2,000 copies in the U.S.

In 2014, when asked if he thought re-recording the album was a good idea Rob Dukes stated "I mean, not really," "but I thought that… Our original plan was to do it live — record a live concert and have it as kind of just a live concert and have those songs part of it. 'Cause Gary was, like, 'Well, we play [the songs] differently. I want the fans to hear how we play them now.' And whatever. But it's always about money, dude. You know what I mean?! They were gonna make money, so they re-did it. So that's the way it went."

In a 2021, interview the bands former guitarist Rick Hunolt who played on the original Bonded by Blood, said that he thought the re-recording sounded alright but thought it was "a complete waste of time."

== Track listing ==
| No. | Title | Writer(s) | Length |
|---|---|---|---|
| 1. | "Bonded by Blood" | Paul Baloff, Gary Holt | 3:35 |
| 2. | "Exodus" | Baloff, Holt | 4:17 |
| 3. | "And Then There Were None" | Holt, Tom Hunting | 5:14 |
| 4. | "A Lesson in Violence" | Holt, Hunolt | 3:47 |
| 5. | "Metal Command" | Baloff, Holt, Mark Whitaker | 4:12 |
| 6. | "Piranha" | Baloff, Holt | 3:54 |
| 7. | "No Love" | Baloff, Holt | 5:48 |
| 8. | "Deliver Us to Evil" | Holt, Hunolt, Whitaker | 7:43 |
| 9. | "Strike of the Beast" | Baloff, Holt | 4:18 |
| 10. | "Hell's Breath" | Kirk Hammett, Holt | 2:49 |

== Personnel ==
Exodus

- Rob Dukes – lead vocals
- Gary Holt – guitars
- Lee Altus – guitars
- Jack Gibson – bass
- Tom Hunting – drums

Additional performers

- Satan's Choir – backing vocals

Production

- Gary Holt – production
- Andy Sneap – mixing, mastering
- Jonnie Zaentz – engineering (guitars & bass)
- Adam Myatt – engineering (drums)
- Jon Ciorciari – engineering (vocals)
