= Rob Dukes =

American heavy metal vocalist

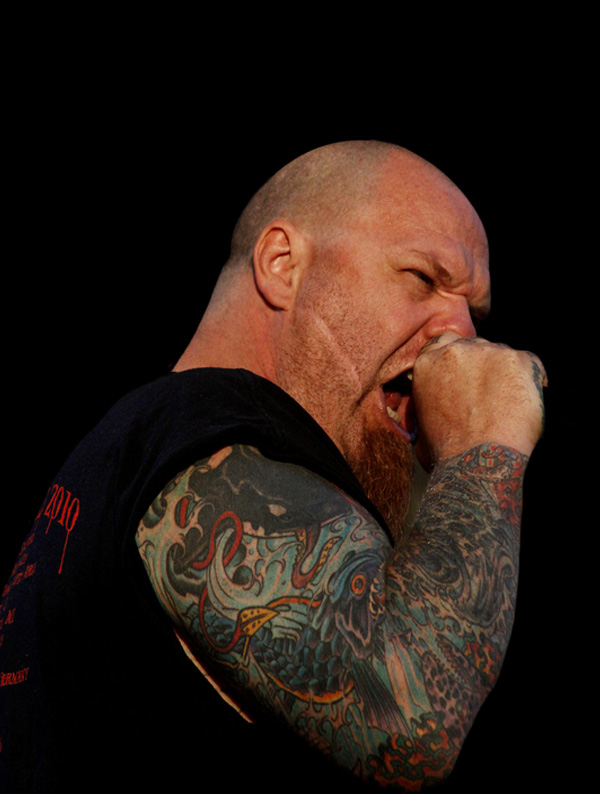
- Dukes with Exodus in 2012

Background information
- Born: March 8, 1968 (age 58); Florida, U.S.
- Origin: New York City, U.S.
- Genre: Thrash metal
- Occupation: Singer
- Years active: 2005–present
- Member of: Exodus, Generation Kill

Robert Dukes (born March 8, 1968) is an American vocalist, best known as the lead singer for the thrash metal band Exodus from 2005 to 2014 and again since 2025. He is also the vocalist of the crossover thrash project Generation Kill.

== Early life ==
Dukes was born in Florida on March 8, 1968, living in Queens, New York City before moving to Nyack, New York, north of Manhattan. He describes his parents as being "kinda hippies" who regularly played records by artists such as The Doors, Black Sabbath and Jimi Hendrix, which was the music he grew up on. His parents divorced when he was young and lived with multiple different family members during his youth. He described his childhood as chaotic and also had trouble making friends growing up, however he noted he would listen to music regularly to "make it all go away."

== Career ==
=== Exodus (2004–2014, 2025–present) ===
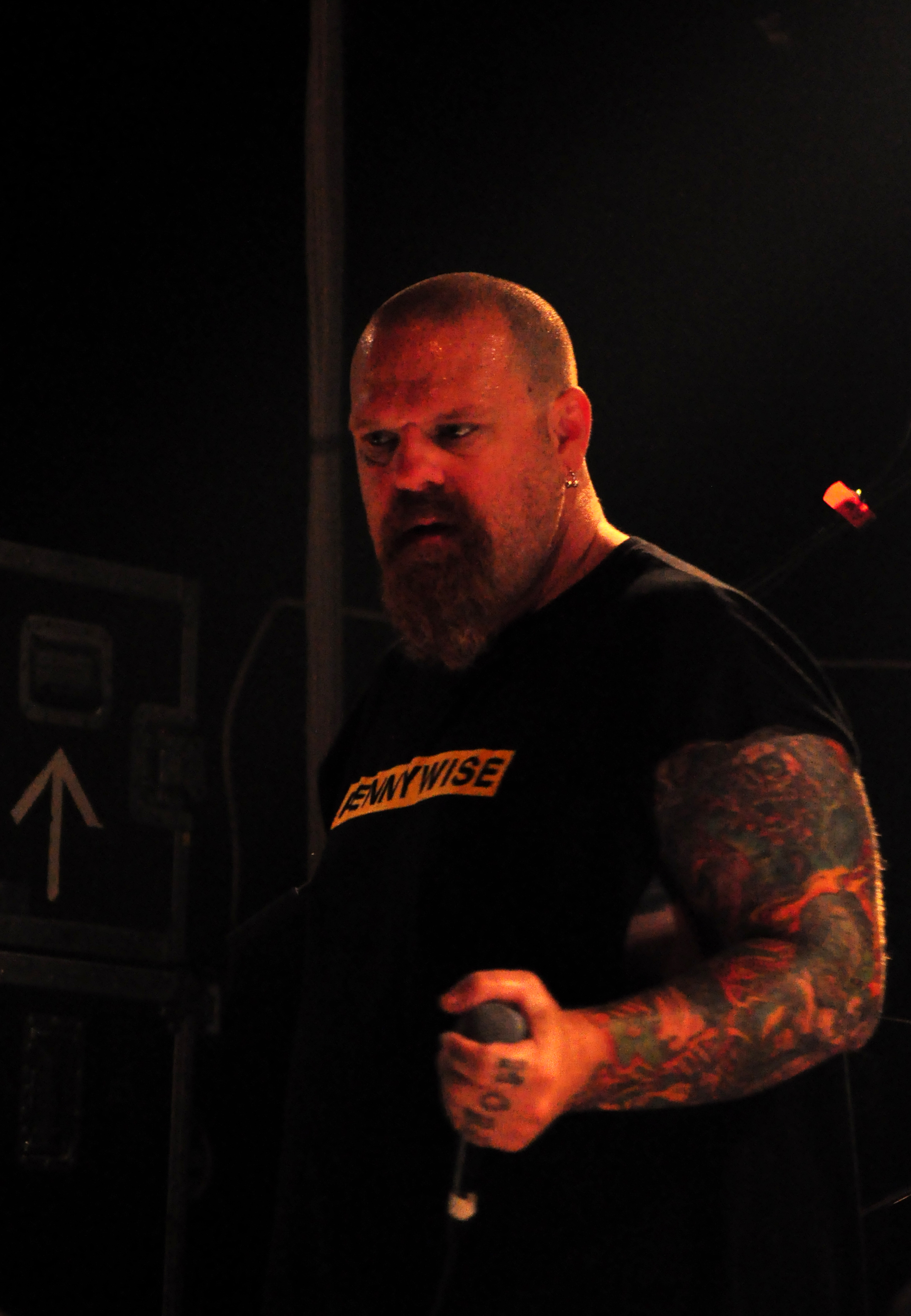
Dukes in 2012

After parting with a band he was part of in New York, Dukes rode his motorcycle on a five-month, 11,000 mile trip to California, with no idea of career prospects. Despite considering a career as a scuba diving instructor, Dukes ended up working as a guitar tech after living in Hollywood for two months. He met and befriended Jeff Hickey, a longtime friend of Exodus. While working for Exodus, Dukes played a demo tape that he composed in 1996 to guitarist Rick Hunolt and drummer Tom Hunting, with no expectation of joining the band. After Steve Souza's departure in 2004, Dukes was asked to audition and ultimately hired as the band's new vocalist and would make his debut on the 2005 album Shovel Headed Kill Machine. He would appear on the next three studio albums, one of which being 2008's Let There Be Blood, a re-recorded version of 1985's Bonded by Blood.

On June 8, 2014, Exodus split with Dukes and reunited with Souza thereafter. Dukes lashed out at his former bandmates and said that he had not spoken to them since his departure and addressed a 20-second phone call conversation he had with drummer Tom Hunting about the band's reunion with Souza. He blamed Testament vocalist Chuck Billy and their management for his dismissal. Billy denied responsibility, but suggested for Exodus to either find a new vocalist or return to Souza: "it made sense, but it wasn't me pushing it. It was just me presenting it to the guys, and the guys made the decision." Dukes recalled that there was no passion in the music before his departure and also criticized the material that the band was working on at the time, calling it "regurgitated shit that we had just done and done over and over again". Following his departure Dukes moved to Arizona and began working as a restoration mechanic repairing 1950s and 60s Volkswagens.

Dukes rejoined with Exodus on July 8, 2017 to perform with them as part of a two-night stint event in San Francisco. He said that he's "totally at peace" over his firing and that performing with the band again "was a lot of fun, man; it was a lot of laughs. The show was great." He has since restored his friendship with the band. In a January 2019 interview, Dukes took ownership over his role in his deteriorating relationship with Exodus, crediting his conversation with Megadeth bassist David Ellefson and T.S.O.L. vocalist Jack Grisham.

On January 15, 2025, Exodus announced that Dukes had rejoined the band. The band posted a press release stating that they were "beyond stoked to have Rob back ripping up the stage with us and he's looking forward to crushing everything like only he can." Dukes' first album since his return to Exodus was 2026's Goliath.

=== Generation Kill (2008–present) ===
Dukes, on hiatus from touring with Exodus, wanted to funnel his excess creative energy and aggression into something new. After the inclusion of Jason Trenczer, Lou Lehman and Sam Inzerra, the band began writing and recording their first album, Red, White and Blood, featuring several hit singles such as "Feast for the Wolves" and "Hate" as well as a cover of the Nine Inch Nails song "Wish" which enjoyed heavy radio rotation.

Due to creative differences with Inzerra and the untimely death of guitarist Lou Lehman, Jay Velez and Jim DeMaria (Heathen) joined and began recording their sophomore album, We're All Gonna Die, with producer Zuess (Rob Zombie, Hatebreed). Shortly after its release, the band embarked on a European tour with fellow Exodus member Lee Altus' band Heathen. The album spawned several successful singles, including "Prophets of War" which went to number one on Sirius Liquid Metal's "Dirty Dozen" and remained one of the top requested songs on the channel.

Following the success of their second album, drummer Robert Youells joined the band and they went into the studio, this time with Ron "Bumblefoot" Thal to record an album with founding member of Run-DMC, Darryl "DMC" McDaniels. The project was initially titled "DMC Generation Kill" before becoming its own entity, later renamed "Fragile Mortals".

In 2021 the band recorded the follow-up to We're All Gonna Die, teaming up once again with Zuess, and with new member Max Velez on bass, and Rob Youells returning as their drummer. The new album "MKUltra" was released in 2022 and featured several special guests including longtime friend and former Exodus bandmate Gary Holt.

=== Other projects ===
Following his departure from Exodus Dukes became the lead singer of Fragile Mortals, releasing one album in 2017. That same year he released a solo four song EP, with Jon "Jonny Rod" Ciorciari on guitar, Scott Reeder on bass and Craig Cefola playing drums. In 2019, it was announced he would be the singer of Blood Moon Ritual which was made up of members from Dark Angel and Sacred Reich.

== Influences ==
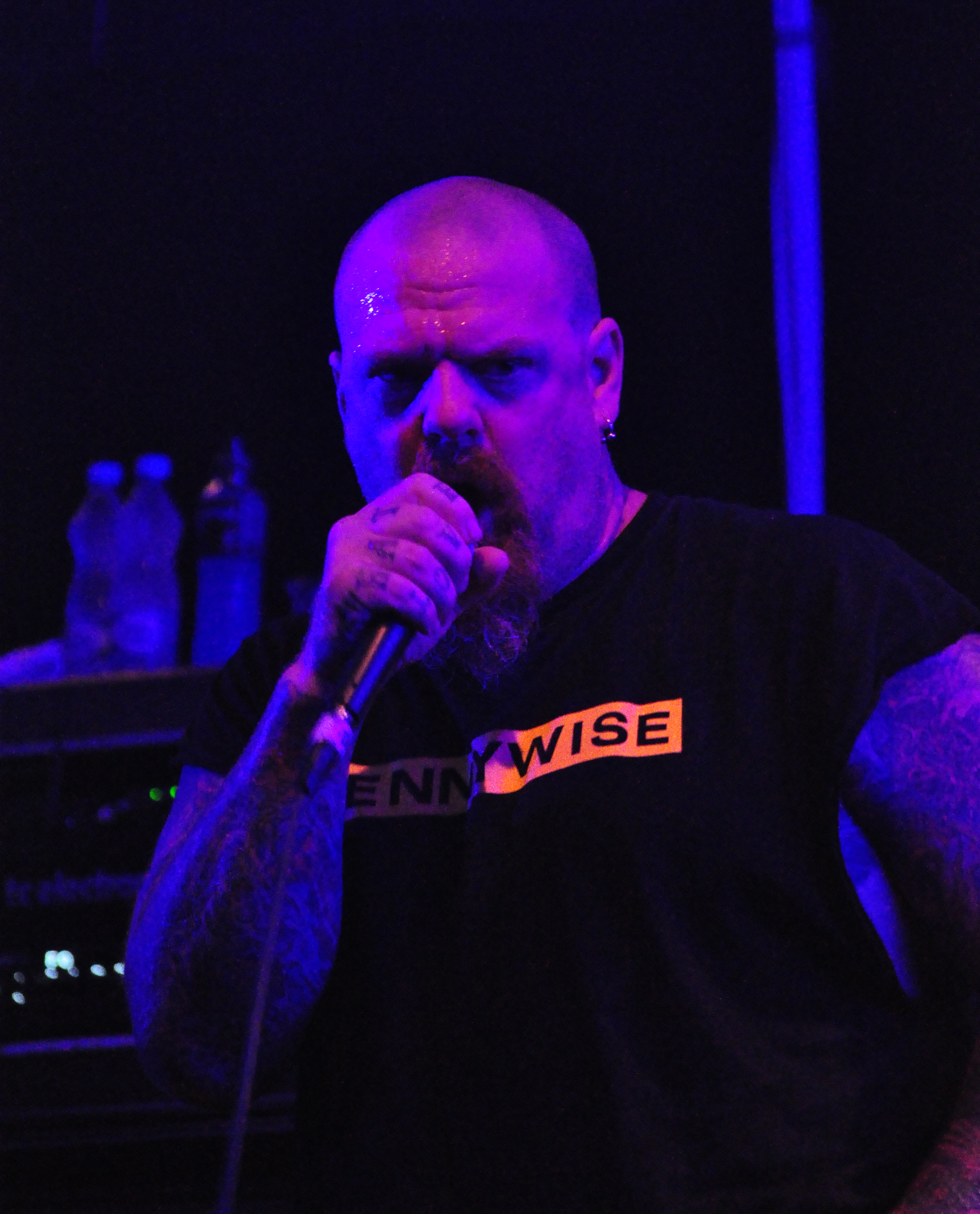
Dukes performing in 2012

Dukes has stated in interviews that punk rock was his gateway into music in terms of angst and attitude: "it wasn't complicated music like metal was, three chords and scream...I can do that". He also plays guitar, claiming that he was "mediocre" but "having fun" at first, with Randy Rhoads as a huge influence, although it took him a month to learn Rhoads' acoustic piece "Dee" from Ozzy Osbourne's Blizzard of Ozz album. On his beginnings as a singer, Dukes said: "I found out I could sing sitting in my room with an acoustic. I liked Maiden and Priest but could never sing that well, then I found Metallica, Megadeth, Exodus, S.O.D., Anthrax, Misfits and thought, 'I can sing like that'."

== Discography ==
With Exodus

- Shovel Headed Kill Machine (2005)
- The Atrocity Exhibition... Exhibit A (2007)
- Let There Be Blood (2008)
- Shovel Headed Tour Machine: Live at Wacken & Other Assorted Atrocities (2010)
- Exhibit B: The Human Condition (2010)
- Goliath (2026)

With Generation Kill

- Red, White and Blood (2011)
- We're All Gonna Die (2013)
- MKUltra (2022)

With Fragile Mortals

- The Dark Project (2017)

Solo

- Dukes EP (2017)
