= Generation Kill (band) =

American thrash metal band

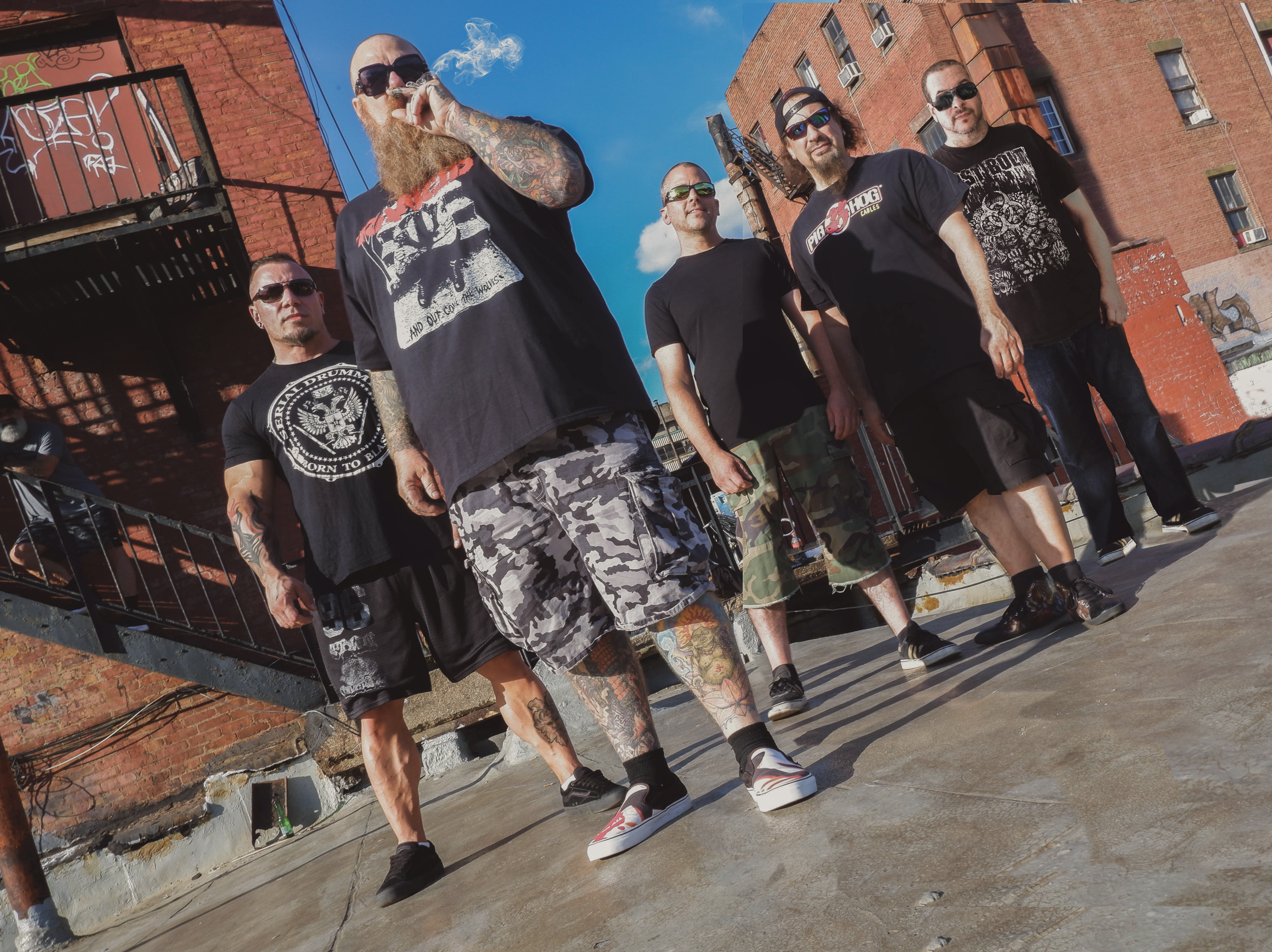
- Generation Kill in 2020

Background information
- Origin: Congers, New York, U.S.
- Genres: Crossover thrash, thrash metal
- Years active: 2008–present
- Label: Nuclear Blast
- Members: Rob Dukes; Jason Velez; Jason Trenczer; Max Velez; Rob Youells
- Past members: Jim DeMaria; Sam Inzerra; Louie "Lou" Lehman; Rob Moschetti; Craig Cefola

Generation Kill is an American crossover thrash band formed in Congers, New York in 2008 by vocalist Rob Dukes (Exodus). After adding Jason Trenczer, Lou Lehman and Sam Inzerra, the band wrote and recorded their first album, Red, White and Blood. Due to creative differences, Inzerra left and Jim DeMaria joined. This lineup recorded their sophomore album, We're All Gonna Die, with producer Zeuss.

With new drummer Robert Youells, the band released an album with former Run-DMC member Darryl "DMC" McDaniels in a project initially titled DMC Generation Kill. The project was later renamed Fragile Mortals. In 2022, the band released MKUltra, the follow-up to We're All Gonna Die.

Dukes took the band's name from the book of the same name.

== Band members ==
=== Current members ===
- Rob Dukes – vocals (2008–present)
- Jason Velez – guitars (2011–present)
- Jason Trenczer – guitars (2008–present)
- Max Velez – bass (2017–present)
- Rob Youells – drums (2015–2017, 2019–present)

=== Former members ===
- Jim DeMaria – drums (2010–2014)
- Sam Inzerra – drums (2008–2010)
- Louie "Lou" Lehman – guitars (2008–2011)
- Rob Moschetti – bass (2008–2016)
- Craig Cefola – drums (2017–2019)

== Discography ==
- Red, White and Blood (2011)
- We're All Gonna Die (2013)
- MKUltra (2022)

=== Fragile Mortals ===
- The Dark Project (2017)
