= The Atrocity Exhibition... Exhibit A =

- Cover art by Seth Siro Anton

Studio album by Exodus
- Released: October 26, 2007
- Studio: Sharkbite Studios
- Genre: Thrash metal
- Length: 59:52; 61:28 (w/o silence)
- Label: Nuclear Blast
- Producer: Andy Sneap

Exodus chronology
Shovel Headed Kill Machine (2005)	The Atrocity Exhibition... Exhibit A (2007)	Let There Be Blood (2008)

The Atrocity Exhibition... Exhibit A is the eighth studio album by American thrash metal band Exodus, released on October 26, 2007. It is the second album to feature Rob Dukes on vocals and Lee Altus on guitars, and it also marks the second comeback of longtime original Exodus drummer Tom Hunting. Hunting's last appearance was on the 2004 album Tempo of the Damned.

== Backgrounds and recording ==
The Atrocity Exhibition... Exhibit A seen the return of drummer Tom Hunting who did not record on their previous 2005, album Shovel Headed Kill Machine. This was due to Hunting struggling with anxiety and needing time off from the band. However after getting in contact with guitarist Gary Holt and playing with him, Holt seen that Hunting was ready to rejoin the band. Paul Bostaph who had took over Huntings position on drums then willingly gave the position back to Hunting.

Holt noted in an interview that the band wanted the album to sound different than their previous effort. So they intentionally made the guitar sound super crunchy and abrasive, with the big bottom-end on them. He staged "With "Shovel Headed Kill Machine", it was more of a high-gain sound that we were after. With this one, we tried out different settings until we knew that we'd found something that was heavy as shit."

== Title ==
The album takes its name from an experimental novel of the same name by J. G. Ballard published in 1970. The name of the album is the same as a planned album that was to be released by the Los Angeles thrash metal outfit Dark Angel in 1992. Guitarist Gary Holt has stated it is named "Exhibit A" because Exodus had planned to release a follow-up Exhibit B album soon afterward, although that album was not released until 2010. He stated that the band had too many songs to fit on one album, so they originally bounced around the idea of making it a 2-disc release however after seeing how much it would cost to do a 2-disc set they decided to do it in two parts.

== Release and reception ==
On October 17, 2007, the entire album was uploaded on the band's MySpace page; however, many of the people that pre-ordered the album from CM Distro received it on October 19. The single released from the album was "Funeral Hymn". There was also a music video released for "Riot Act". The song "Riot Act" was released as DLC for the video game Rock Band 2 via the Rock Band Network on June 6, 2010.

Professional ratings
Review scores
Source	Rating
About.com	4.5/5 stars
AllMusic	3.5/5 stars
Blabbermouth.net	8/10 stars
Metal.de	8/10

The Atrocity Exhibition... Exhibit A was well received by the metal press. In addition, it won the 2007 Metal Storm Award for Best Thrash Metal Album.

AllMusic wrote "like it or not, into every long-term career, change and risk-taking must come sometimes, and, given a few more years (not least for Dukes to further establish himself), one feels that The Atrocity Exhibition will stand up as one of Exodus' deepest, and most intriguing albums." Blabbermouth.net added "The Atrocity Exhibition" may be good violent fun, but “friendly" got excised from the EXODUS dictionary some time ago. Brutal, massive, and wholly impressive stuff."

Exhibit A sold 3,600 copies in its first week of release in the U.S., and as of November 2008 had sold 22,000 copies in the U.S.

== Track listing ==
All songs written by Gary Holt, except where noted.

No.	Title	Lyrics	Music	Length
1.	"Call to Arms" (instrumental)			1:33
2.	"Riot Act"			3:37
3.	"Funeral Hymn"			8:38
4.	"Children of a Worthless God"	Rob Dukes	Lee Altus, Holt	8:25
5.	"As It Was, as It Soon Shall Be"			5:16
6.	"The Atrocity Exhibition"			10:33
7.	"Iconoclasm"			7:54
8.	"The Garden of Bleeding"			5:49
9.	"Bedlam 1-2-3" (includes hidden track (Note: "Bedlam 1-2-3" ends at 7:58. A hidden track "Bonded by Banjo" starts at 18:08 after 10 minutes and 10 seconds of silence. On the digital version, the tracks are separated.))			19:51
10.	"Untitled" ( (Note: Unlisted on the tracklist and is removed on the digital version.))			0:06
Total length:				71:43

== Personnel ==
Exodus

- Rob Dukes – vocals
- Gary Holt – guitars
- Lee Altus – guitars
- Jack Gibson – bass
- Tom Hunting – drums

Additional personnel

- Andy Sneap – production, engineering, mixing
- Raymond Anthony – additional lead guitar engineering
- Adam Myatt – assistant engineering
- Kieran Panesar – assistant mixing
- Seth Siro Anton – artwork
- Karyn Crisis – photos

== Charts ==
Chart (2007)	Peak position
German Albums (Offizielle Top 100)	74
