= Goliath (Exodus album) =

Studio album by Exodus
- Released: March 20, 2026
- Recorded: 2025
- Studio: Trident
- Genre: Thrash metal
- Length: 54:09
- Label: Napalm
- Producer: Exodus

Exodus chronology
Persona Non Grata (2021)	Goliath (2026)

Singles from Goliath
- 1. "3111" Released: January 21, 2026; 2. "Goliath" Released: February 18, 2026; 3. "Promise You This" Released: March 18, 2026

Goliath is the thirteenth studio album by American thrash metal band Exodus. The album was released on March 20, 2026. It is their first studio album to feature vocalist Rob Dukes since Exhibit B: The Human Condition (2010), and also the band's first album to be released through Napalm Records, with whom the band signed in 2023.

== Background and recording ==
About two weeks after the release of Persona Non Grata, Gary Holt spoke to The Aquarian Weekly about a potential follow-up album. In a December 2021 interview with Guitar.com, Holt promised that there would not be another seven-year gap in between two studio albums.

On June 20, 2023, it was announced that Exodus had parted ways with Nuclear Blast after 20 years on the label, and they were signed to Napalm Records. A few days later, Holt confirmed via Instagram that he was "fully in writing mode now, assembling the pieces of the next album opener." Frontman Steve "Zetro" Souza announced in October 2023 that the band would enter the studio around March or April 2024 to begin recording their new album, which was expected to be released by September of that year; he would later clarify that studio plans were pushed back to May 2024 due to slow progress and he had not yet heard anything that the members of Exodus were writing. Holt stated in an interview with Full Metal Jackie in August 2024 that the band would begin recording their new album in early 2025.

Exodus parted ways with Souza in January 2025, and the band replaced him with his predecessor Rob Dukes. Exodus also announced its plans to record a new album with Dukes. Holt announced in February 2025 that Exodus would release their new album in 2026.

Prior to the recording process, drummer Tom Hunting was traveling California, and when Gary Holt would come up with a new riff Hunting would meet up with him and the two would work on it together. They went into the studio with 7 songs written and ended up recording 18 total. Hunting also described the album as the bands most collaborative effort.

The album's recording sessions took place during the summer and fall of that year, and mixing was handled by Mark Lewis, making this the first time in more than three decades that the band had not worked with Andy Sneap.

== Release and promotion ==
On January 21, 2026, Exodus announced the resulting album, titled Goliath, which would be released on March 20, 2026, and released the album's lead single "3111". The second single, "Goliath", was released on February 18, 2026. The third single, "Promise You This", was released on March 18, 2026.

A music video was released for the song "3111" two versions of the video were released. One uncensored version which was uploaded on a website called exodus3111.com. and a censored version which was posted on the band’s official YouTube channel.

=== Touring ===
Exodus supported the album with a number of major tours, including supporting Megadeth on the Canadian leg of their final tour, Kreator on the European leg of their Krushers of the World tour, and Sepultura on their final North American tour.

== Reception ==
Professional ratings
Review scores
Source	Rating
Blabbermouth.net	9/10
Distorted Sound	8/10
Ghost Cult Magazine	7/10
Metal Master Kingdom	8.5/10 stars
Metal.de	8/10
Wall of Sound	7/10

Blabbermouth.net gave the album a 9/10 stating "Goliath" is what happens when the passion never deserts you, and the hunger to get heads banging and fists pumping grows stronger by the year. Listen to it at excruciating volume and get ready for a life-threatening adrenaline rush. This monster lives." KJ Davern of Wall of Sound wrote "Back in 2021 I proclaimed that Persona Non Grata signaled that Exodus was back. Well Exodus is still on top with Goliath. It’s different in the best kind of way. Hard, heavy, fast. Maybe it’s not a great pure Exodus album but it’s a fantastic metal album." Metal.de noted "All in all, the long wait was worth it. "Persona Non Grata" is a relentless thrash powerhouse that sees EXODUS at the very top of their game. There is no filler, no let-up, and absolutely no boredom here." Disorted Sound Magzine added "It’s so ill-tempered that it almost gets a bit ridiculous, but that’s always been part of the appeal for EXODUS. We can argue for the rest of our lives over whether they should have been included in The Big Four, but that’s all but irrelevant now. EXODUS are shamelessly metal, and for all the spilled blood, they’re fun too. This is thrash at its most bluntly cathartic, Goliath is a blast."

== Track listing ==
Goliath track listing
No.	Title	Lyrics	Music	Length
1.	"3111"	Rob Dukes; Gary Holt	Lee Altus	4:08
2.	"Hostis Humani Generis"	Holt	Holt	5:21
3.	"The Changing Me"	Dukes; Altus	Altus	6:14
4.	"Promise You This"	Holt	Holt	5:19
5.	"Goliath"	Holt	Holt	5:04
6.	"Beyond the Event Horizon"	Dukes	Altus	5:16
7.	"2 Minutes Hate"	Dukes	Altus	4:55
8.	"Violence Works"	Holt	Holt	4:49
9.	"Summon of the God Unknown"	Holt	Holt	7:54
10.	"The Dirtiest of the Dozen"	Tom Hunting	Holt	5:09
Total length:				54:09

== Personnel ==
Credits adapted from album liner notes.

=== Exodus ===
- Rob Dukes – lead vocals
- Gary Holt – guitars
- Lee Altus – guitars
- Jack Gibson – bass
- Tom Hunting – drums, backing vocals

=== Additional contributors ===
- Exodus – production
- Mark Lewis – engineering, mixing, mastering
- Jesse Fioren – engineering
- Juan Urteaga – engineering
- Peter Tägtgren – lead vocals on "The Changing Me"
- Katie Jacoby – strings on "Goliath"

== Charts ==
Chart performance for Goliath
Chart (2026)	Peak position
Austrian Albums (Ö3 Austria)	4
Belgian Albums (Ultratop Flanders)	31
Belgian Albums (Ultratop Wallonia)	81
Finnish Albums (Suomen virallinen lista)	8
French Albums (SNEP)	162
French Rock & Metal Albums (SNEP)	4
German Albums (Offizielle Top 100)	9
German Rock & Metal Albums (Offizielle Top 100)	4
Hungarian Physical Albums (MAHASZ)	13
Japanese Rock Albums (Oricon)	11
Japanese Western Albums (Oricon)	6
Norwegian Physical Albums (IFPI Norge)	2
Polish Albums (ZPAV)	11
Scottish Albums (Official Charts)	13
Swedish Hard Rock Albums (Sverigetopplistan)	15
Swedish Physical Albums (Sverigetopplistan)	11
UK Albums Sales (OCC)	14
UK Independent Albums (Official Charts)	7
UK Rock & Metal Albums (Official Charts)	3
US Top Album Sales (Billboard)	16
