= Pleasures of the Flesh =

Studio album by Exodus
- Released: 1987
- Studio: Alpha-Omega (San Francisco)
- Genre: Thrash metal
- Length: 46:15
- Label: Combat
- Producers: Exodus; Marc Senesac; Mark Whitaker (drum tracks)

Exodus chronology
Bonded by Blood (1985)	Pleasures of the Flesh (1987)	Fabulous Disaster (1989)

Original cover

Pleasures of the Flesh is the second studio album by the American thrash metal band Exodus. Released in 1987, it is the group's first album to feature Steve Souza on vocals after Paul Baloff was fired from the band. The record was remastered and re-issued by Century Media in 1998 for distribution in Europe only.

== Overview ==
Pleasures of the Flesh was to originally feature cover art with an illustration of the band depicted as cannibals preparing and eating their meal. However, prior to release, the cover was replaced with a photo of the group members leaning on a bar. Just before the record's issuance, the original album cover was promoted by the record company in music magazines with the headline "Metal's Heaviest Meal". It was also available as a limited edition picture disc LP.

The writing and recording sessions for Pleasures of the Flesh took two years to complete. The album's release was delayed numerous times when Exodus continued touring in support of Bonded by Blood, and singer Paul Baloff had left the band just prior to the recording sessions, which began in 1987. There are several demos of songs from the album with Baloff circulating on the internet. Although he did not perform on the album, Baloff received writing credits for the tracks "Seeds of Hate", "Pleasures of the Flesh" and "Brain Dead".

Following the release of Pleasures of the Flesh, Exodus toured for less than a year to promote it. They embarked on a month-long U.S. tour with Celtic Frost and Anthrax. The band toured the U.S. again in January and February 1988, this time with M.O.D. as a supporting act, which was followed three months later by a European tour with Lȧȧz Rockit.

== Reception ==
Professional ratings
Review scores
Source	Rating
AllMusic	2/5 stars
Collector's Guide to Heavy Metal	7/10

Pleasures of the Flesh received a negative review from AllMusic's Eduardo Rivadavia, who awarded the album two stars out of five, and called it a "very disappointing release". He added that the album "left little hope for the future, but incredibly, Exodus would rebound with excellent results on 1989's Fabulous Disaster." Conversely, Martin Popoff described the album as a "full-frontal, uncannily displayed, top-flight thrash" work, with some "daunting compositional sophistication" in it. However, he was not thrilled by the mid-range dominated sound and the "claustrophobic, guitar-dominated chainsaw-massacre effect" in the music.

Pleasures of the Flesh entered the US Billboard 200 chart, peaking at No. 82.

== Track listing ==
All tracks are written by Exodus, except where noted.

Side one
No.	Title	Writer(s)	Length
1.	"Deranged"		3:46
2.	"'Til Death Do Us Part"		4:50
3.	"Parasite"		4:55
4.	"Brain Dead"	Exodus, Paul Baloff	4:15
5.	"Faster than You'll Ever Live to Be"		4:26

Side two
No.	Title	Writer(s)	Length
6.	"Pleasures of the Flesh"	Exodus, Baloff	7:37
7.	"30 Seconds"		0:40
8.	"Seeds of Hate"	Exodus, Baloff	4:57
9.	"Chemi-Kill"		5:46
10.	"Choose Your Weapon"		4:52

Limited edition and Japanese bonus tracks
No.	Title	Writer(s)	Length
11.	"Chemi-Kill" (Live)		5:44
12.	"'Til Death Do Us Part" (Live)		4:38
13.	"Brain Dead" (Live)		4:29
14.	"Dirty Deeds Done Dirt Cheap" (Live, AC/DC cover)	Angus Young, Malcolm Young, Bon Scott	4:15

== Personnel ==
=== Exodus ===
- Steve "Zetro" Souza – vocals
- Gary Holt – guitars
- Rick Hunolt – guitars
- Rob McKillop – bass
- Tom Hunting – drums

=== Production ===
- Produced by Exodus and Marc Senasac (except drum tracks produced by Marc Whitaker)
- Recorded and mixed at Alpha-Omega, San Francisco
- Engineered by Marc Senasac and Sylvia Massey
- Mastered by Bernie Grundman, Los Angeles

== Charts ==
Year	Chart	Position
1987	Dutch MegaCharts	72
1988	US Billboard 200	82
