= Shovel Headed Kill Machine =

Studio album by Exodus
- Released: October 4, 2005
- Recorded: Trident Studio in Pacheco, California
- Genre: Thrash metal
- Length: 52:53
- Label: Nuclear Blast
- Producer: Gary Holt

Exodus chronology
Tempo of the Damned (2004)	Shovel Headed Kill Machine (2005)	The Atrocity Exhibition... Exhibit A (2007)

Shovel Headed Kill Machine is the seventh studio album by the American thrash metal band Exodus, released on October 4, 2005 through Nuclear Blast. It's the first album to feature new vocalist Rob Dukes, after the departure of Steve "Zetro" Souza during the band's South American tour in support of the band's previous album Tempo of the Damned. It is also the band's first studio album not to feature Rick Hunolt on guitars, with Lee Altus as his replacement, and the only Exodus album to feature Paul Bostaph on drums after Tom Hunting's second departure as a result of the reoccurrence of the illness that prompted him to depart in 1989. Shovel Headed Kill Machine sold over 3,000 copies in its first week of release in the U.S.

== Background ==
Prior to the bands 2004, South American tour singer Steve "Zetro" Souza parted ways with the band during according to Holt, Zetro bailed from the tour just as the tour was about to start. This caused the split to be fairly hostile. Following his departure Rob Dukes who was working as the bands guitar tech was asked to audition as Souza’s replacement and was ultimately hired as the band's new vocalist and would make his debut on the album.

Drummer Tom Hunting took a leave of absence from the band due to suffering from panic attacks and guitarist Rick Hunolt left the band to spend time more with his children. They were replaced by Paul Bostaph and Lee Altus respectively. However Hunting would return on their follow up album The Atrocity Exhibition... Exhibit A.

== Recording ==
During a 2005 interview with Blabbermouth.net guitarist Gary Holt stated that he had written a majority of both the music and the lyrics on the album. Holt wanted the album to have an overall raw sound, he noted that the main reason for this was the band having recorded the album in a significantly shorter time frame then their previous release Tempo of the Damned. Just three weeks after drummer Paul Bostaph, joined the band, they entered the studio.

Despite all the lineup changes prior to the album Holt noted that it had no effect on the album or any ideas he had for it. However he did state that Bostaph’s drumming did give the album a different style compared to Huntings.

== Reception ==
Professional ratings
Review scores
Source	Rating
AllMusic	3.5/5 stars
Blabbermouth.net	8.5/10
PopMatters	6/10
Stylus Magazine	B+
Terrorizer	8.5/10

In a review in Terrorizer, the album was praised as "a tremendous effort in its own right and an air guitarist's wet dream". Blabbermouth.net wrote "It doesn't take a rocket scientist to figure out what is going on here. "Shovel Headed Kill Machine" is about crushing the weak and, if necessary, burying them alive. Bottom line? EXODUS couldn't have produced a better follow-up to "Tempo of the Damned". Greg Prato of AllMusic added "It's rare in the early 21st century to come across a straight-ahead, honest to goodness thrash metal album, but Shovel Headed Kill Machine certainly fits the bill, as evidenced by such tracks as "Deathamphetamine" and the album-closing title track. And you've got to love the cover artwork, which has '80s-era metal written all over it (and would surely have been airbrushed on the backs of many metalheads' denim jackets if released during thrash metal's heyday)."

== Track listing ==
All songs written by Gary Holt except where noted.

No.	Title	Lyrics	Music	Length
1.	"Raze"	Holt, Rob Dukes	Holt	4:17
2.	"Deathamphetamine"			8:31
3.	"Karma's Messenger"	Dukes	Holt	4:14
4.	"Shudder to Think"			4:48
5.	"I Am Abomination"			3:25
6.	"Altered Boy"			7:37
7.	"Going Going Gone"			4:59
8.	"Now Thy Death Day Come"			5:11
9.	".44 Magnum Opus"			6:56
10.	"Shovel Headed Kill Machine"			2:57
Total length:				52:53

Digipak bonus track
No.	Title	Length
11.	"Purge the World"	4:02

Japan edition bonus track
No.	Title	Length
11.	"Problems" (Sex Pistols cover)	4:25

Limited 2 edition bonus tracks
No.	Title	Length
11.	"Purge the World"	4:02
12.	"Problems" (Sex Pistols cover)	4:25

== Personnel ==
Exodus

- Rob Dukes – vocals
- Gary Holt – guitars
- Lee Altus – guitars
- Jack Gibson – bass
- Paul Bostaph – drums

Production

- Produced by Gary Holt
- Engineered by Juan Urteaga
- Recorded at Trident Studio
- Mixed and Mastered by Andy Sneap at Backstage Studios in Derby, UK

== Charts ==
Chart (2005)	Peak position
Japanese Albums (Oricon)	146
US Independent Albums (Billboard)	41
