= Mark Whitaker (music producer) =

American record producer

Mark Whitaker is a San Francisco Bay Area-based music producer who was the manager of Exodus and sound engineer of Metallica in the 1980s. Whitaker acted as a producer on Exodus’ debut album Bonded by Blood (1985) and partly on their second effort Pleasures of the Flesh (1987). He managed former Exodus guitarist Kirk Hammett to Metallica in 1983. Whitaker was one of the key persons in the emerging Bay Area thrash metal scene in the 1980s.
