= Rob Youells =

American drummer

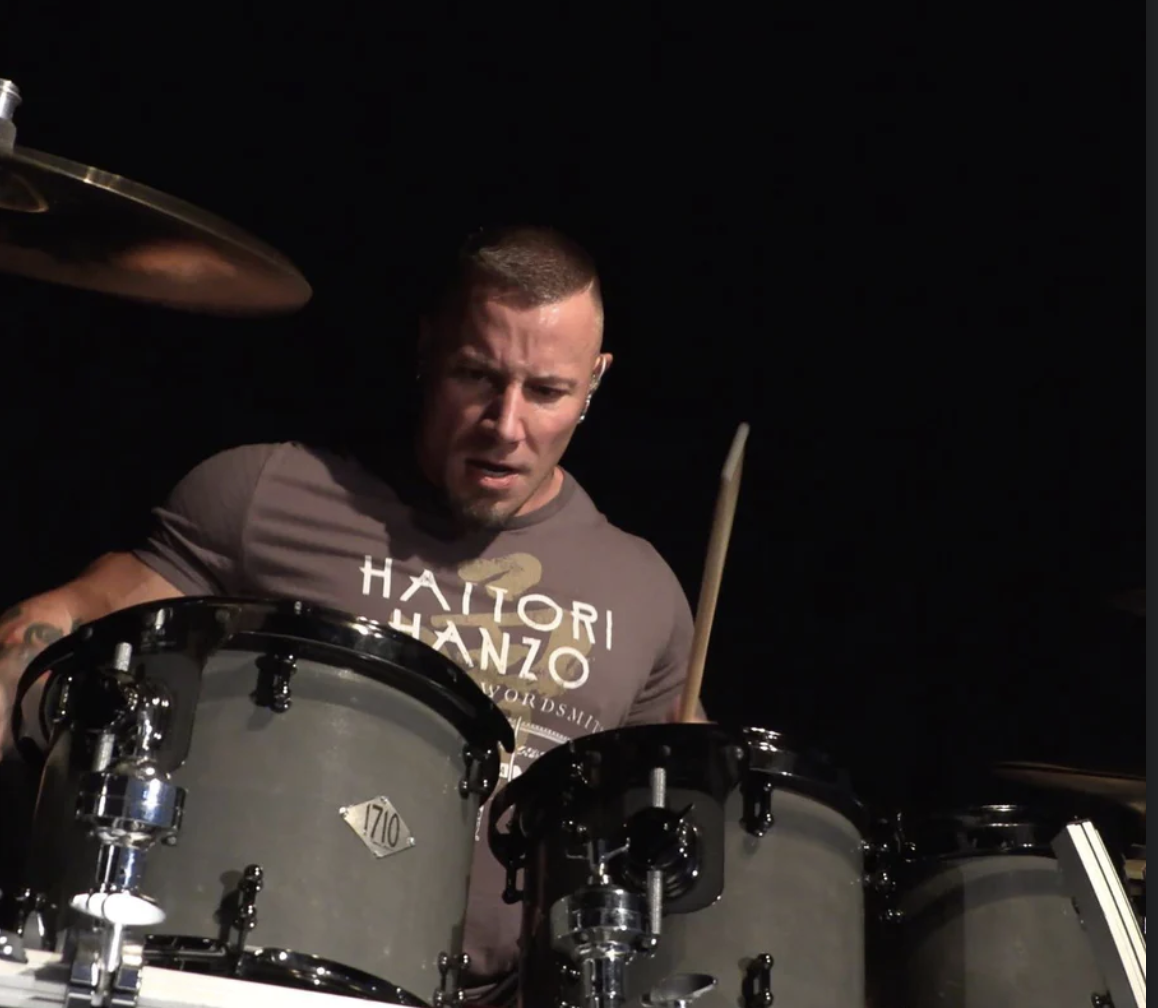
Youells on the set of Generation Kill's video "Never Relent"

Robert Youells is an American musician, fitness model, heavyweight bodybuilding champion, IFBB Pro bodybuilder, and actor. He is best known for his work as a voice actor in Grand Theft Auto: The Ballad of Gay Tony (2009) and for being the drummer for the thrash metal band Generation Kill. He has also appeared on Saturday Night Live (2005) and Deadly Sins (2012).

== Early life and education ==
Youells was born in Livingston, New Jersey to Ruth Johanna Youells née Waldenmaier and Robert E. Youells Jr. He began taking drum lessons at age six, studying with Rick Aquino until age nine. At eleven, he switched to studying with Keith Necessary, a student of Joe Morello. He also studied with Joe Nevolo for a few years.

== Career ==
Youells has appeared on Saturday Night Live (2005), Late Night with Conan O'Brien, and Guiding Light. He is also the cast member of Off Season and had a supporting role in a short film, Meet My Boyfriend, which screened at the 2011 Manhattan Film Festival. Youells also appeared in the 2011 film The Sitter, starring Jonah Hill. He provided the voice of Evan Moss in The Lost and Damned and Grand Theft Auto: The Ballad of Gay Tony. Youells has modeled for Vogue and Muscle and Fitness.

In 2004, Youells started in National Bodybuilding, and took a break in 2013 due to his mother's death,. He then joined back in 2014, when he won the Masters Over 35 Overall. Contributing to Muscle and Fitness Magazine, sharing his thoughts regarding fitness and gym culture. In 2012, he was a sponsored athlete with Muscular Development.

In 2014, he became the drummer for the New York thrash band Generation Kill, as well as the drummer for another thrash/rap band named Fragile Mortals, featuring Darryl McDaniels of the rap/rock legends Run-DMC. After Youells joined, the band released an album titled The Dark Project. In 2020 he rejoined his former bandmates in the studio once again to record the third album for Generation Kill, titled MKUltra. The album was released to critical acclaim.

== Competition history ==
=== 2004 ===
- East Coast Championships – NPC, Heavyweight, 2nd
- Eastern USA Championships – NPC, Heavyweight, 2nd
- Nationals – NPC, Heavyweight, did not place

=== 2009 ===
- Atlantic States Championships – NPC, Heavyweight, 3rd
- East Coast Championships – NPC, Overall Winner
- East Coast Championships – NPC, Super-Heavyweight, 1st
- Eastern USA Championships – NPC, Heavyweight, 3rd
- Junior Nationals – NPC, Heavyweight, 4th
- Nationals – NPC, Heavyweight, 14th

=== 2010 ===
- North American Championships – IFBB, Heavyweight, 3rd

=== 2011 ===
- Nationals – NPC, Heavyweight, 2nd
- North American Championships – IFBB, Heavyweight, 6th

=== 2012 ===
- Nationals – NPC, Heavyweight, 3rd
- North American Championships – IFBB, Masters 35+ Heavyweight, 2nd
- North American Championships – IFBB, Heavyweight, 4th
- USA Championships – NPC, Heavyweight, 3rd

=== 2014 ===
- Pittsburgh Pro – IFBB, Masters 40+, 2nd
- Tampa Pro Championships – IFBB, Did not place
- Team Universe Championships – NPC, Masters 35+ Heavyweight, 1st
- Team Universe Championships – NPC, Masters 40+ Heavyweight, 2nd
- Team Universe Championships – NPC, Masters 35+ Overall Winner
