= Exodus (band) =

American thrash metal band

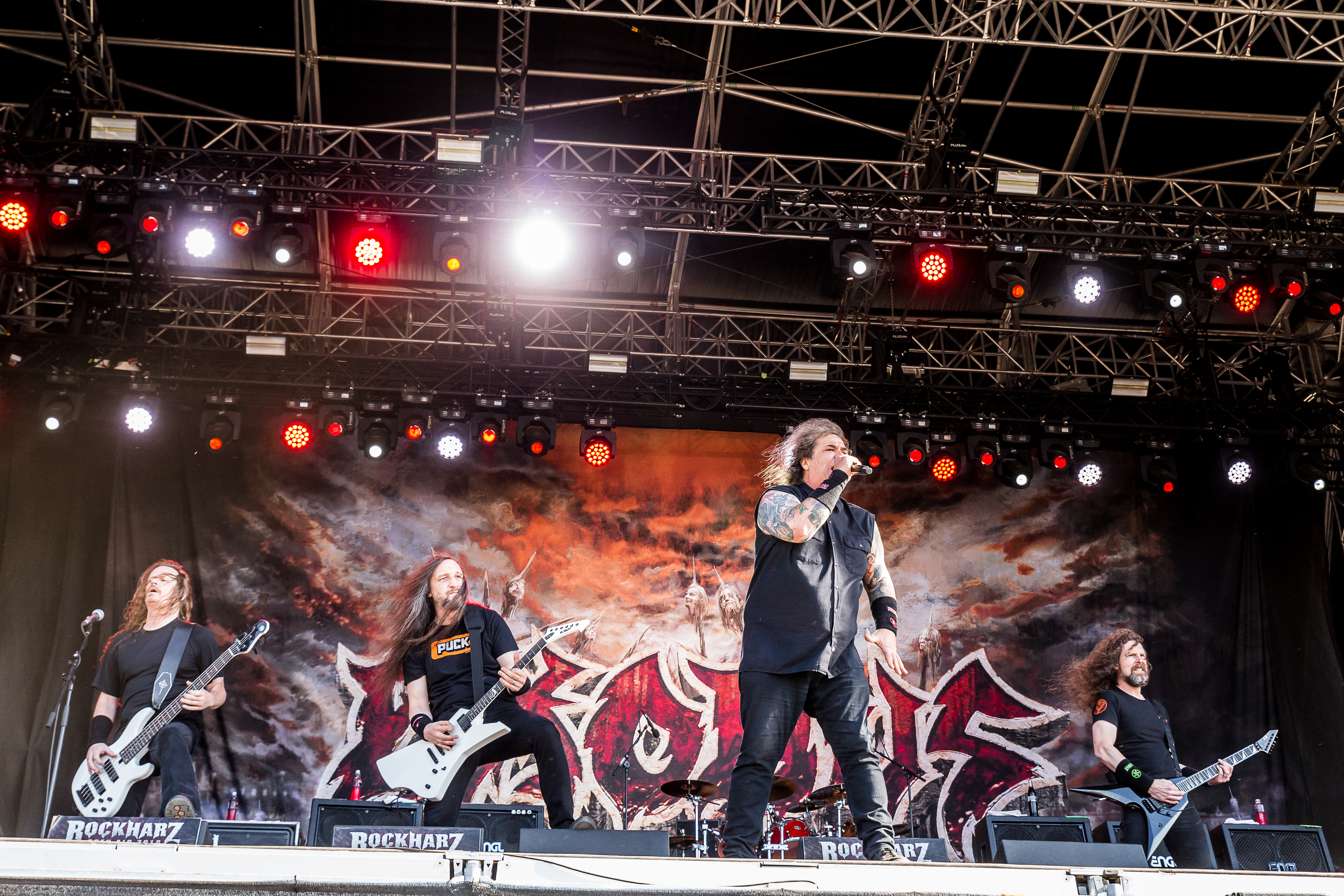
- Exodus performing at the Rockharz Open Air festival in 2018

Background information
- Origin: Richmond, California, U.S.
- Genre: Thrash metal
- Works: Discography
- Years active: 1979–1993; 1997–1998; 2001–present
- Labels: Capitol; Century Media; Combat; Relativity; Allied Artists Music Group; Nuclear Blast; Torrid; Napalm
- Members: Tom Hunting; Gary Holt; Jack Gibson; Lee Altus; Rob Dukes
- Past members: Kirk Hammett; Carlton Melson; Tim Agnello; Keith Stewart; Jeff Andrews; Paul Baloff; Mike Maung; Evan McCaskey; Rob McKillop; Rick Hunolt; John Tempesta; Michael Butler; Steve "Zetro" Souza; Paul Bostaph
- Website: exodusattack.com

Exodus is an American thrash metal band formed in 1979 in Richmond, California. Their current lineup consists of guitarists Gary Holt and Lee Altus, bassist Jack Gibson, drummer Tom Hunting and lead vocalist Rob Dukes. Notable former members include vocalists Paul Baloff and Steve "Zetro" Souza, drummers John Tempesta and Paul Bostaph, and founding guitarist Kirk Hammett, who later joined fellow Bay Area thrash metal band Metallica. There are no original members left in Exodus other than Hunting, who departed from the band twice, in 1989 and 2004, and rejoined in 2007. Holt, who has been in the band since 1981, is the only member to appear on every Exodus album. Much of the band's career has been affected by lineup changes, feuds between band members and record companies, two extended hiatuses, deaths of former band members, and drug addictions.

Exodus has released thirteen studio albums, three live albums, one compilation album, and a re-recording of their first album. The band had particular success during the mid-to-late 1980s with their first three studio albums: Bonded by Blood (1985), Pleasures of the Flesh (1987) and Fabulous Disaster (1989). The critical praise given to Fabulous Disaster garnered attention from major labels, including Capitol Records, with whom Exodus signed in 1989 and released two albums for the label: Impact Is Imminent (1990) and Force of Habit (1992). After their first breakup in 1993 and a short-lived reunion from 1997–1998, Exodus reunited again in 2001, and, since then, has released eight more studio albums, starting with and including Tempo of the Damned (2004), which reignited Exodus' popularity and is considered a key part in the early-to-mid-2000s thrash metal revival. The band's thirteenth and latest studio album, Goliath, was released on March 20, 2026.

Along with Metallica, Exodus is recognized as a Bay Area thrash metal pioneer, and has been referred to as one of the region's so-called "Big Six" alongside Testament, Death Angel, Lȧȧz Rockit, Forbidden, and Vio-lence. Exodus has sold over five million albums worldwide, and is considered one of the "Big Eight" of thrash metal, along with Metallica, Megadeth, Slayer, Anthrax, Testament, Overkill, and Death Angel. In 2016, Loudwire named them the 25th best metal band of all time.

== History ==
=== Formation and early years (1979–1984) ===
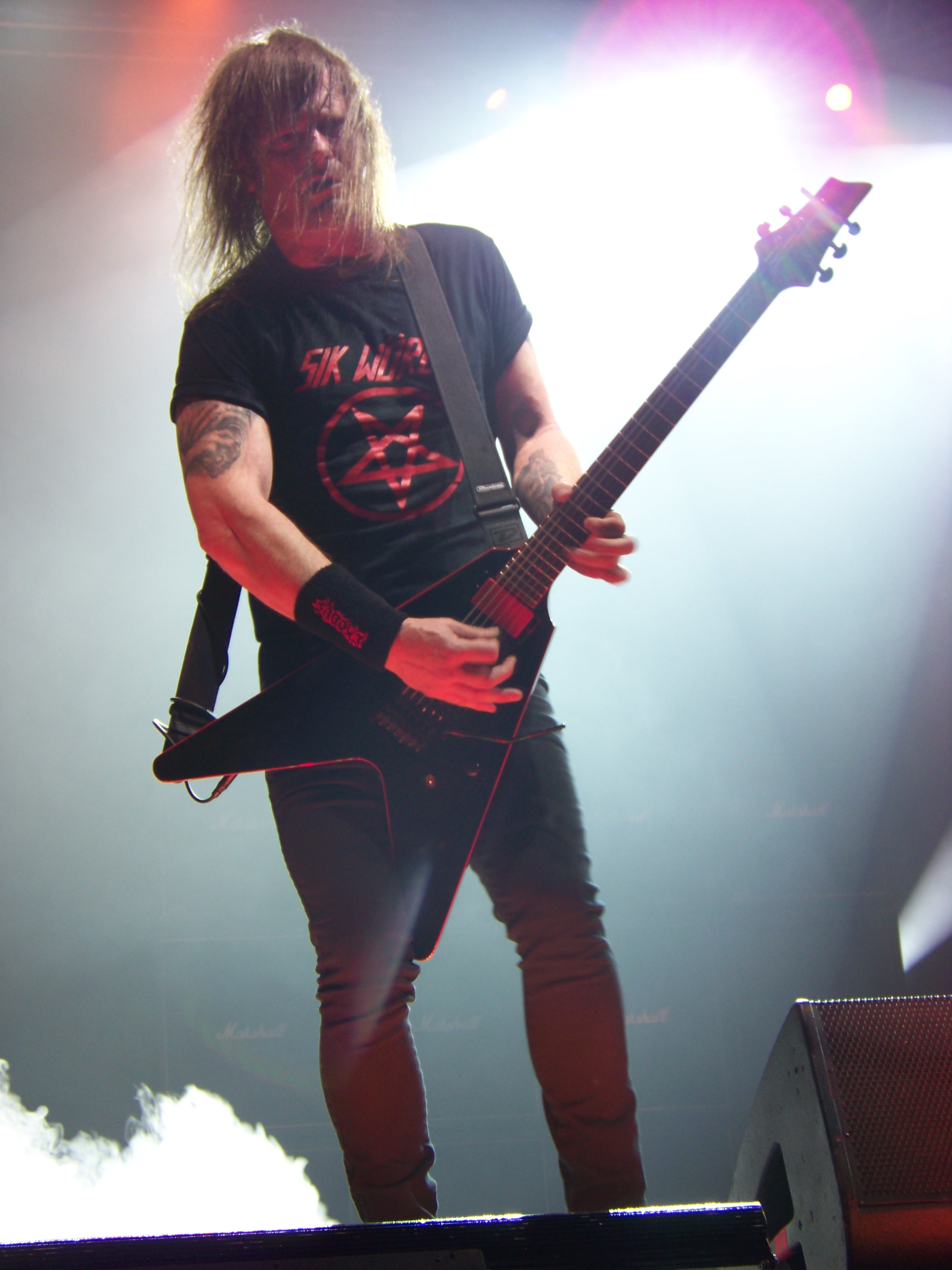
Gary Holt has been the guitarist of Exodus since 1981, and is the only member to have performed on all of the band's albums.

Exodus was formed in 1979 by guitarists Kirk Hammett and Tim Agnello, drummer and vocalist Tom Hunting, and vocalist Keith Stewart, while they attended high school together. The band added bass guitarist Carlton Melson in 1980, and the quintet began making a name for themselves playing backyard parties and various school functions. They played mostly cover songs in the vein of 1970s hard rock and the new wave of British heavy metal (NWOBHM) acts but had also developed some of their own original songs. Stewart soon left the band and Hunting became the band's sole vocalist for some time. Melson was replaced in 1981 by bass guitarist Jeff Andrews. Agnello would also leave the group which left Exodus to perform as a power trio until a replacement guitarist was found in Hammett's friend and Exodus roadie Gary Holt.

Hammett had befriended Paul Baloff over their shared admiration for punk rock and 1970s heavy metal music, and he was soon brought into the fold as the band's lead vocalist. The band's music began to incorporate elements of hardcore punk into their NWOBHM roots, and Exodus was considered by many as a pioneer of the Bay Area thrash metal scene. The quintet recorded a three-track demo tape in 1982 consisting of the songs "Whipping Queen", "Death and Domination" and "Warlord", a release which would be Hammett's only recording with Exodus until 2014. This demo was widely circulated in the underground tape trading community, and has been cited as an influence or inspiration by some of Exodus' peers on the thrash metal circuit, with the members of Metallica, Slayer and Anthrax reportedly having received copies of the demo via tape trading before recording their respective debut albums.

As the band played more shows in regional clubs, they gained a large, fervent fanbase known for their violent concert behavior. In November 1982, Exodus opened for Metallica at the Old Waldorf venue in San Francisco, and it was there that the latter first met Hammett. In April 1983, Hammett left Exodus to replace Dave Mustaine in Metallica on the recommendation of producer and then-manager Mark Whitaker, leaving Holt to effectively take creative control of the band. Hammett was replaced temporarily by Mike Maung, followed by Evan McCaskey, before the band finally found a permanent replacement in guitarist Rick Hunolt. Jeff Andrews also left to start an early incarnation of pioneering death metal band Possessed, and was replaced by bass guitarist Rob McKillop. Throughout 1983, mainly played shows in San Francisco and Berkeley opening for bands such as Murder, Outrage and Raven.

With the lineup stabilized, Exodus entered Turk Street Studios in the spring of 1984 with producer Doug Piercy (then-guitarist of Anvil Chorus and later Heathen) to record demos of songs that would later appear on their debut album. The band was signed to New York-based start-up label Torrid Records and Exodus entered Prairie Sun Recording Studios in Cotati that summer. The group continued touring their native California throughout the year alongside bands such Slayer, Megadeth and Mercyful Fate.

=== Bonded by Blood and rise in popularity (1984–1991) ===
The band recorded their debut album, Bonded by Blood, during the summer of 1984 with the band's manager Mark Whitaker producing. Concert photos from their 1984 performance at Aquatic Park's Eastern Front Metal Festival (with Slayer and Suicidal Tendencies) and at Ruthie's Inn (with Megadeth and Slayer) were included on the album sleeve inserts. Originally titled A Lesson in Violence, the album was not released until April 1985 amidst creative and business setbacks. Whilst Bonded by Blood is considered a highly influential thrash metal album today, critics have regarded the delay in its release as having hindered the impact the album could have had. As AllMusic reviewer Eduardo Rivadavia would later write in his review for the album, "Had it been released immediately after it was recorded in 1984, Exodus' Bonded by Blood might be regarded today alongside Metallica's Kill 'Em All as one of the landmark albums responsible for launching the thrash metal wave." Exodus promoted the album by going on tour with Venom and Slayer on the Ultimate Revenge Tour. Four songs from their performance of April 5, 1985 at Studio 54 in New York City were filmed and released on home video as Combat Tour Live: The Ultimate Revenge. The band subsequently toured or played selected shows with Exciter, Megadeth, Anthrax, King Diamond, Possessed, D.R.I., Nuclear Assault, and Hirax. In the fall of 1985, the band supported Venom on their European tour, the group then sporadically toured California throughout 1986.

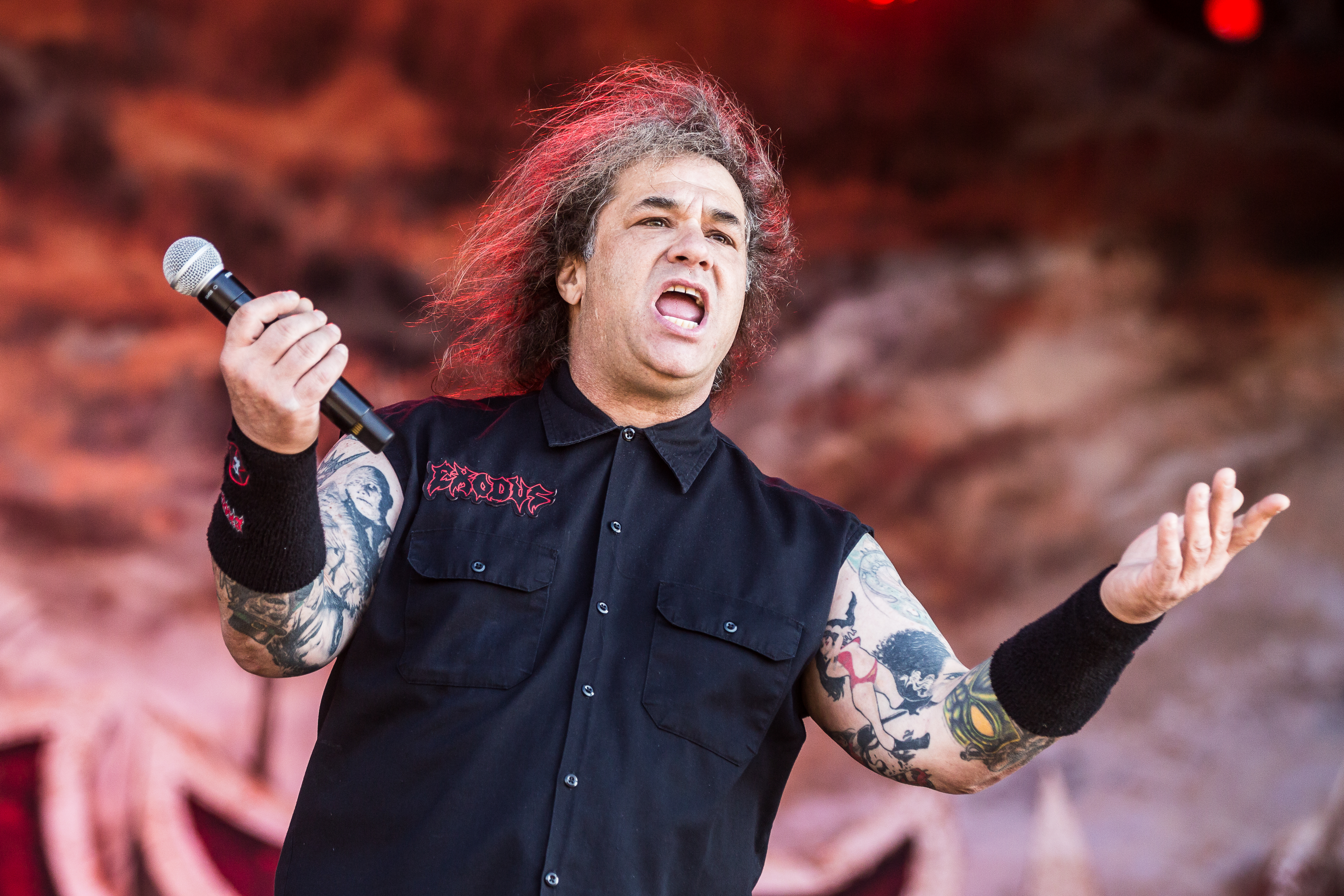
Vocalist Steve "Zetro" Souza, who replaced Paul Baloff, was a member of Exodus from 1986 to their first breakup in 1993. He rejoined the band twice, from 2002 to 2004 and 2014 to 2025.

Shortly after touring for Bonded by Blood was complete, Baloff was fired from the band allegedly due to his behavior related to alcohol and substance abuse. He was replaced by Steve "Zetro" Souza, who had previously been the lead vocalist for Legacy, a precursor of fellow Bay Area thrashers Testament. Baloff went on to form the band Piranha in 1987.

Exodus' lineup remained stable for the recording of their next two albums, and the underground success attained with Bonded by Blood would lead to the group's signing to Sony/Combat Records, who released the band's second album Pleasures of the Flesh in October 1987. The album was engineered by a then-unknown Sylvia Massy, who would go on to produce two releases by progressive metal band Tool. Following the release of Pleasures of the Flesh, Exodus toured for less than a year to promote it. They embarked on a month-long U.S. tour with Celtic Frost and Anthrax. The band toured the U.S. dubbed the "Metal Party Tour" again in January and February 1988, this time with M.O.D. as a supporting act, which was followed three months later by a European tour with Lȧȧz Rockit.

The group's third full-length album, Fabulous Disaster, was released in January 1989. A music video for the song "The Toxic Waltz" would receive consistent rotation on MTV's Headbangers Ball. Promotion for the album included Exodus embarking on a month-long European tour with Nuclear Assault and Acid Reign. During the spring they went on the U.S. Headbangers Ball Tour with Anthrax and Helloween, which brought the band to a wider audience. Early in the tour, drummer Tom Hunting left the band for health and personal reasons. Vio-lence drummer Perry Strickland was quickly brought into the fold as a temporary replacement for the remainder of the tour, and John Tempesta would fill the position on a permanent basis until the band's first breakup in 1993. Exodus then embarked on another North American tour, which lasted from May to July 1989; supporting acts were Sick of It All, Faith or Fear, Forbidden, Dead Orchestra and Wehrmacht. Fabulous Disaster reached No. 82 on the Billboard 200 chart.

After the success of Fabulous Disaster, Exodus signed a multi-album deal with Capitol Records in 1989. The band's fourth album, Impact Is Imminent, was released in July 1990. Despite being released on a major label, Impact Is Imminent was not as successful as Fabulous Disaster; it debuted at No. 137 on the Billboard 200, the band's lowest chart position to date. Until the release of Blood In, Blood Out in 2014, Impact Is Imminent was Exodus' last album to enter the Billboard 200 chart. Exodus spent the latter half of 1990 touring in support of the album, including North America with Suicidal Tendencies and Pantera. Due to their label refusing to pay tour support, the world tour for Impact for Imminent was cut short; they were originally slated to tour Europe with Annihilator and Judas Priest as part of the latter's Painkiller tour (where Exodus was replaced by Pantera), and the band was also reportedly intended to be the replacement for Death Angel as the support act of the Clash of the Titans tour in North America with Megadeth, Slayer and Anthrax before the offer went to the then-up-and-coming band Alice in Chains.

In 1991, the band released its first live album, Good Friendly Violent Fun, which was recorded at the Fillmore on July 14, 1989.

=== Force of Habit, hiatus, and first reunion (1991–2000) ===
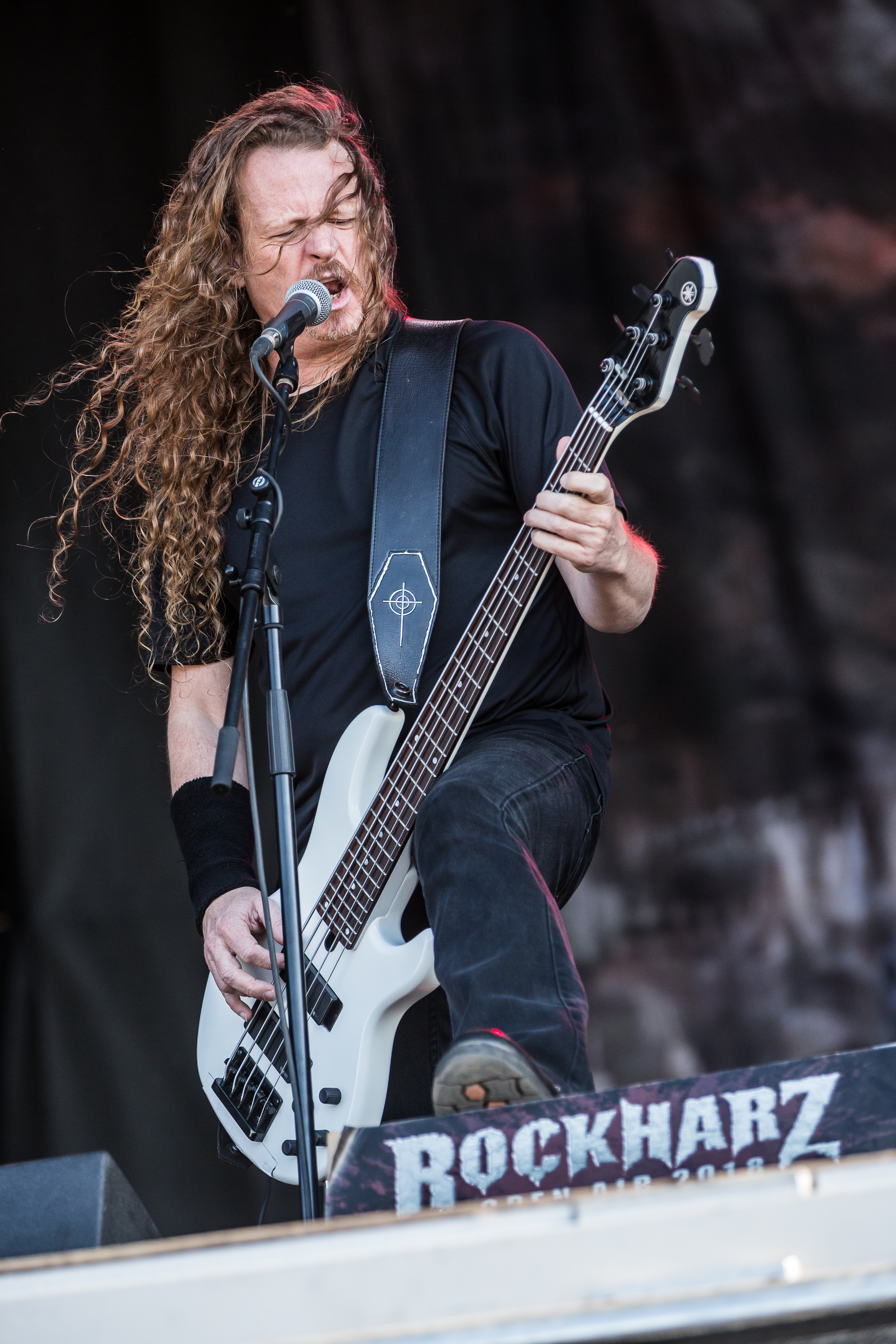
Jack Gibson has been the bass guitarist of Exodus since the band's first reunion in 1997.

After the release of Good Friendly Violent Fun, the band toured sporadically for a year. Bass guitarist Rob McKillop was replaced by Michael Butler before the group recorded and released their next studio album, Force of Habit, in 1992. This album was something of a departure from the band's signature sound, containing several slower, "heavier" songs with less emphasis on the thrash aspect of their older material. The 11-minute track "Architect of Pain" is a good example of the change of direction, having a much slow and progressive, grinding feel than the usual high tempo thrash they had become known for. Following the album's release, Exodus supported Black Sabbath on their Dehumanizer US tour, and then toured with Body Count and D.R.I. in January 1993. After touring for Force of Habit was completed, behind-the-scenes issues as well as a changing musical environment prompted the band to split up in late 1993.

Holt and Hunting formed the groove/thrash metal outfit Wardance in the mid-1990s, playing several shows around the Bay Area and recording a four-song demo, but the group never gained momentum and eventually disbanded.

Holt and Hunting reunited with Baloff and Hunolt for a short Exodus tour in 1997. The lineup was completed with Wardance bassist Jack Gibson. They released a live album titled Another Lesson in Violence recorded at the Trocadero Transfer in front of a home town audience. However, the group disbanded again the following year, in part due to a falling out with record label Century Media over the way promotion for the live album was handled, and over an aborted attempt at a live concert video which was filmed, but never released due to a financial dispute. They toured throughout the entirety of 1997 playing shows in the US and Europe, then Exodus on another hiatus for a short period before touring South America in 1998.

=== Second reunion, Tempo of the Damned, and switching singers (2001–2004) ===
In 2001, Exodus reformed once again with the 1997 lineup, initially to play the Thrash of the Titans concert, which was held as a benefit for Testament's Chuck Billy and Death's Chuck Schuldiner, both of whom were battling cancer. There was talk of recording a new studio album and the band continued to play shows in and around the San Francisco Bay Area.

However, on February 2, 2002, Baloff died after suffering a stroke. Former vocalist Steve "Zetro" Souza was brought back into the band to finish the rest of their concert commitments. Although it appeared to outsiders that with Baloff's death Exodus would cease to exist, guitarist Gary Holt was determined to release a new studio album. The result was 2004's Tempo of the Damned, released on Nuclear Blast Records. An oddity of the recording sessions was that one track, "Crime of the Century", was dropped under mysterious circumstances. The song chronicled Exodus' time under Century Media (of which Nuclear Blast is a subsidiary). Although it was publicly denied, rumors swirled that Century Media forced the song off the record. "Crime of the Century" was replaced with "Impaler", a song which was written when Kirk Hammett was still in the band, and was previously featured on the Another Lesson in Violence live record. Despite selling fewer than 15,000 copies in its first year of release, Tempo of the Damned received generally positive reviews from fans and critics alike, and is now considered to be an important part of the 2000s thrash metal revival movement. Throughout 2004, Exodus toured worldwide in support of the album.

In September 2004, Souza once again left the band due to business and personal differences. This led to a bitter feud between himself and Holt, who subsequently issued a statement in which he was heavily critical of Souza, claiming he had suddenly left the band while on tour only a day before they were due to leave for a show in Mexico City. In retrospective accounts, both Holt and Souza stated that the reasons for the split were primarily financial: Souza had a full time job as a union carpenter having to care for his family, but his managers posed him an ultimatum as a result of his continued absence from his day job due to touring.

Exhumed frontman Matt Harvey filled in for the Mexico City date and Steev Esquivel (Defiance and Skinlab) played on the fall South American dates. The band eventually found a permanent replacement in Rob Dukes, who had previously worked as the band's guitar tech.

=== Rob Dukes-era (2005–2014) ===
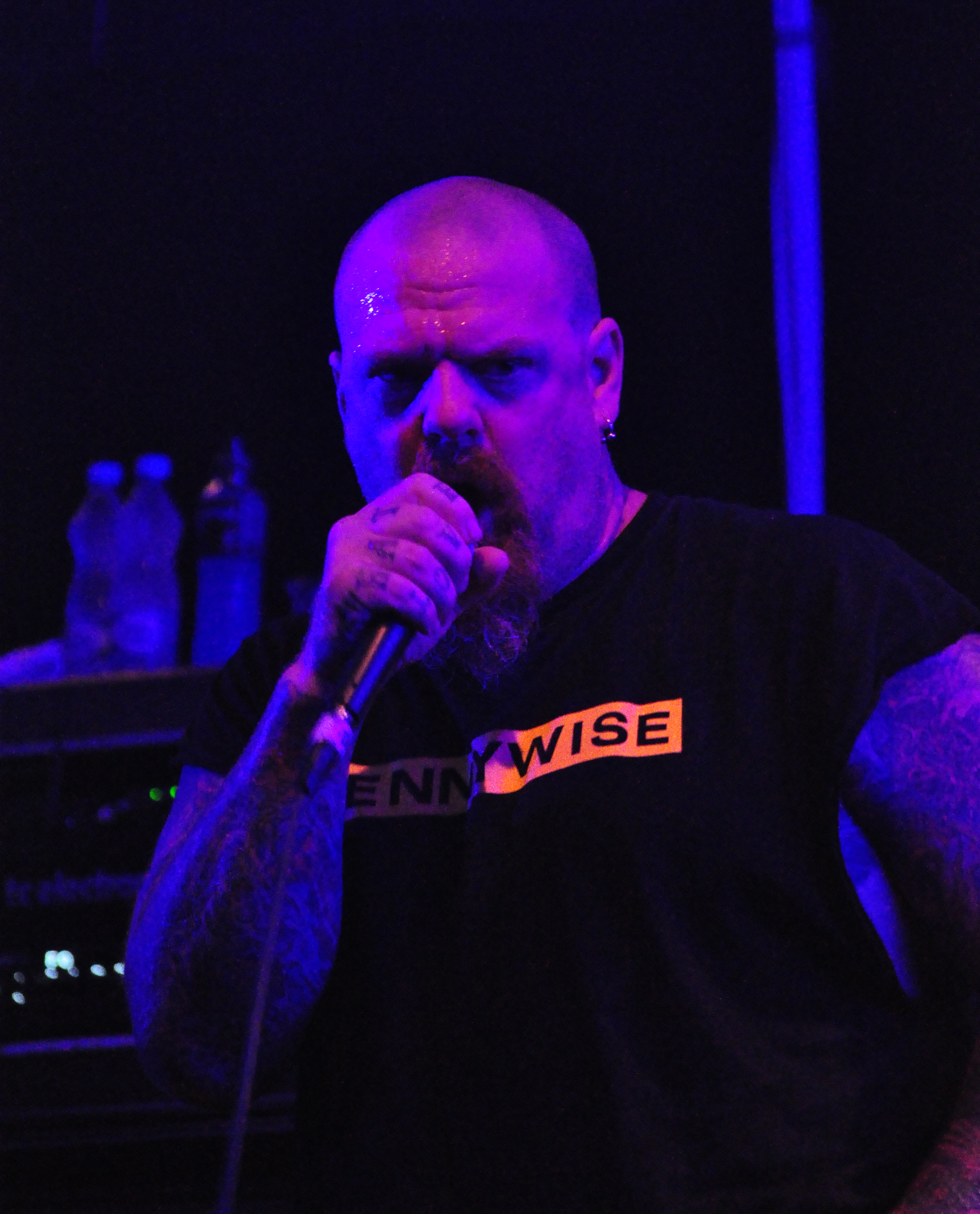
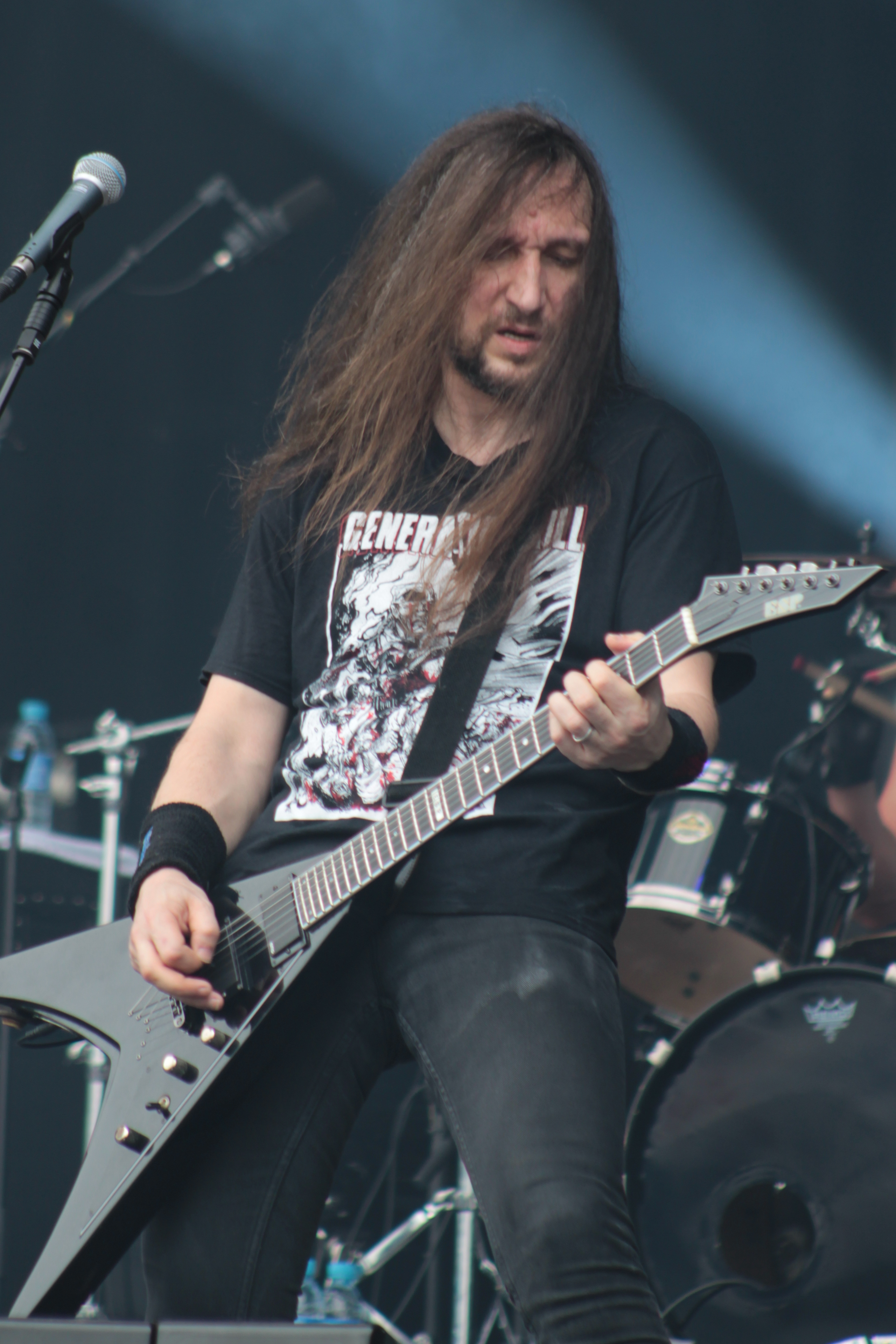
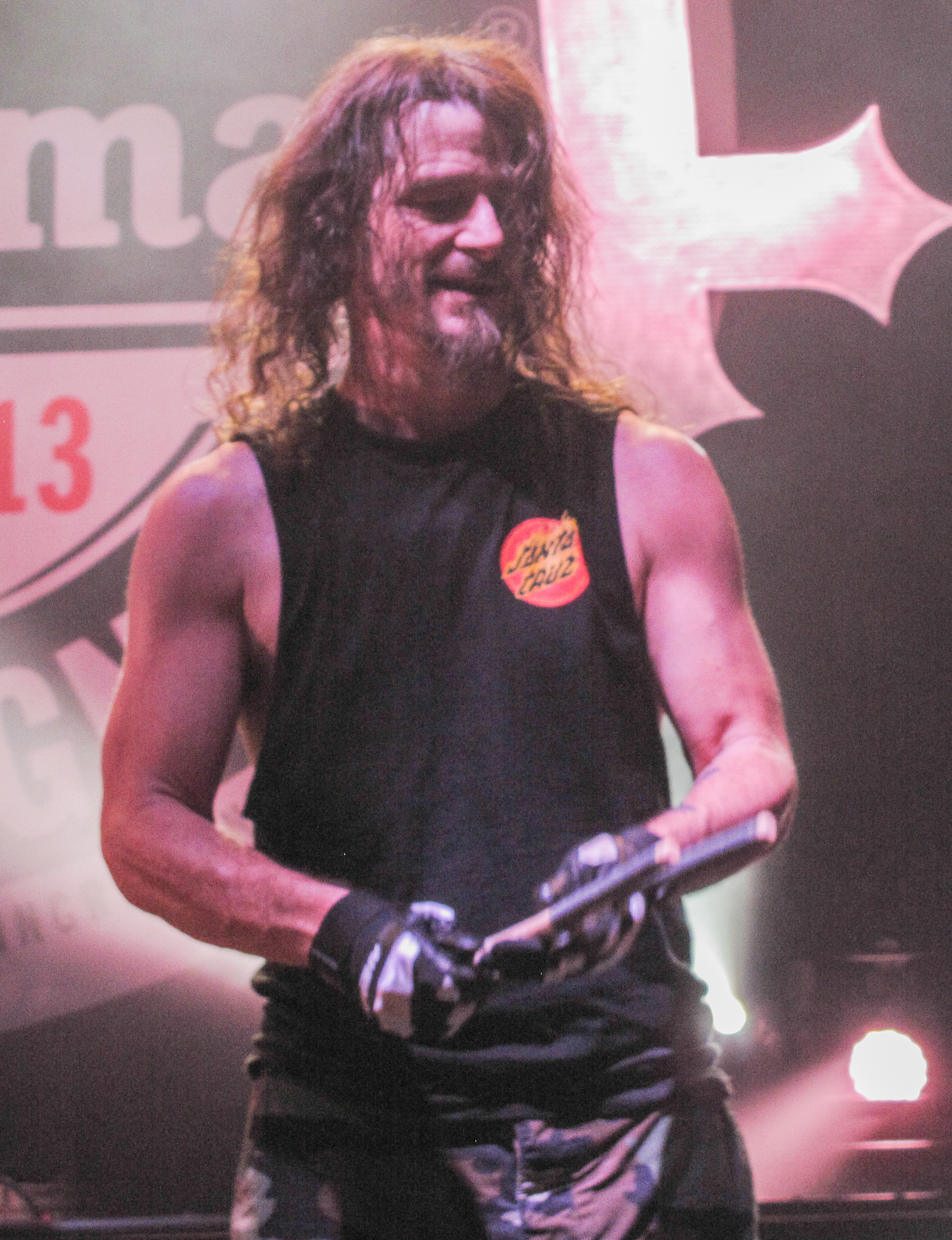
Vocalist Rob Dukes, guitarist Lee Altus and drummer Paul Bostaph all joined Exodus in 2005, replacing Steve "Zetro" Souza, Rick Hunolt and Tom Hunting respectively.

In 2005, longtime guitarist Rick Hunolt left the band to focus on his family, and was replaced by Heathen guitarist Lee Altus. Tom Hunting also took leave of the band following a re-occurrence of the nervous problems that led to his initial departure in 1989. Hunting was replaced with Paul Bostaph, who had previously played with Slayer and Testament. The revamped lineup released the album Shovel Headed Kill Machine in 2005. The tour for the album led to extensive travel of North America, Europe, and Japan, as well as their first-ever visit to Australia.

In the spring of 2006, Exodus held the North American Abomination tour with support acts such as Full Blown Chaos, Suffocation and Cryptospy. They also took part in the "Monsters of Mayhem" tour alongside Hatebreed and Napalm Death.

Hunting returned to the band in March 2007 in time to record and release their eighth studio album The Atrocity Exhibition... Exhibit A to mostly positive reception. Exodus released a re-recording of their 1985 debut album Bonded by Blood entitled Let There Be Blood in 2008. Gary Holt released the following statement about the band's decision to revisit their debut album: "After many years in the planning and discussion stage, we have finally completed the re-recording of Bonded by Blood. We have decided to call it Let There Be Blood and it is our way of paying homage to [late singer] Paul Baloff by showing how relevant these songs we had written together still are. We aren't trying to replace the original; that's impossible anyway. We are just giving these songs the benefit of modern production. It's something we talked about before Paul's death and it's always been important to us to do. We were super excited about entering the studio once again to record these classics, and now it's back to writing the next studio record!"

They performed at Wacken Open Air Festival in the summer of 2008, and toured Latin America later that year. In February 2009, Exodus toured Europe alongside Overkill, then in April, they embarked on a co-headlining North American tour with Kreator which also featured Belphegor, Warbringer, and Epicurean. Exodus then went on tour supporting Arch Enemy along with Arsis and Mutiny Within.

Exodus provided the voices of the customers at the Duncan Hills Coffee Shop and five of the sick people in Cartoon Network's Metalocalypse.

In March 2010, the band was included on Megadeth's Rust in Peace 20th anniversary tour, along with Testament. The album Exhibit B: The Human Condition was recorded in Northern California with British producer Andy Sneap and released on Nuclear Blast Records in May 2010. It was the band's first album since Impact Is Imminent to reach the Billboard 200, peaking at number 114 with 4,600 copies sold in its first week. Exodus was featured on the cover of Decibel magazine's June 2010 issue, with a feature article on them. During the summer of that year the band headlined a North America tour, they took part in the Thrashfest European tour alongside Kreator, Suicidal Angels, and Death Angel during the Fall.

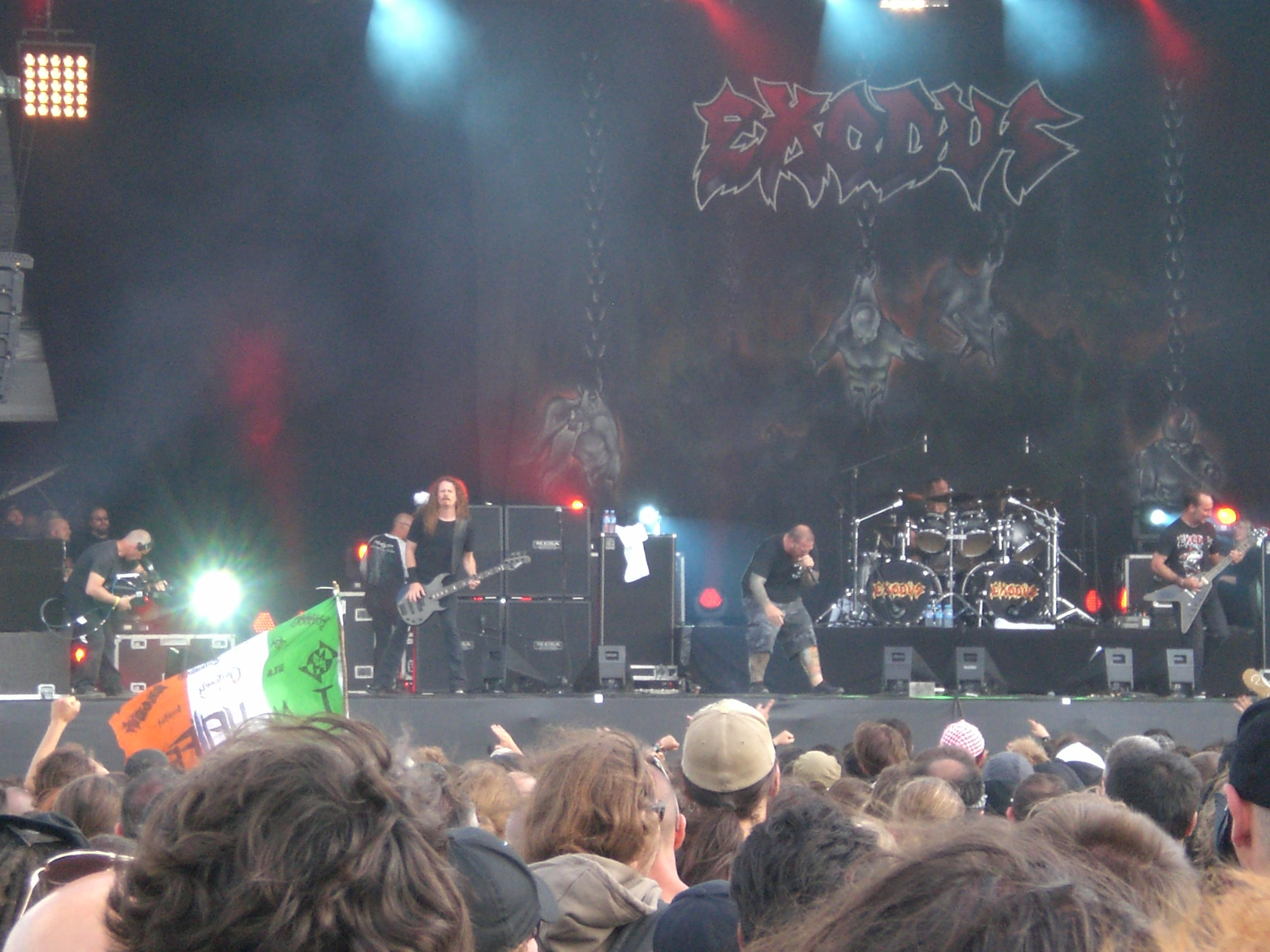
Exodus at 2012 Hellfest. This was one of the band's first shows with former guitarist Rick Hunolt (far right) in seven years.

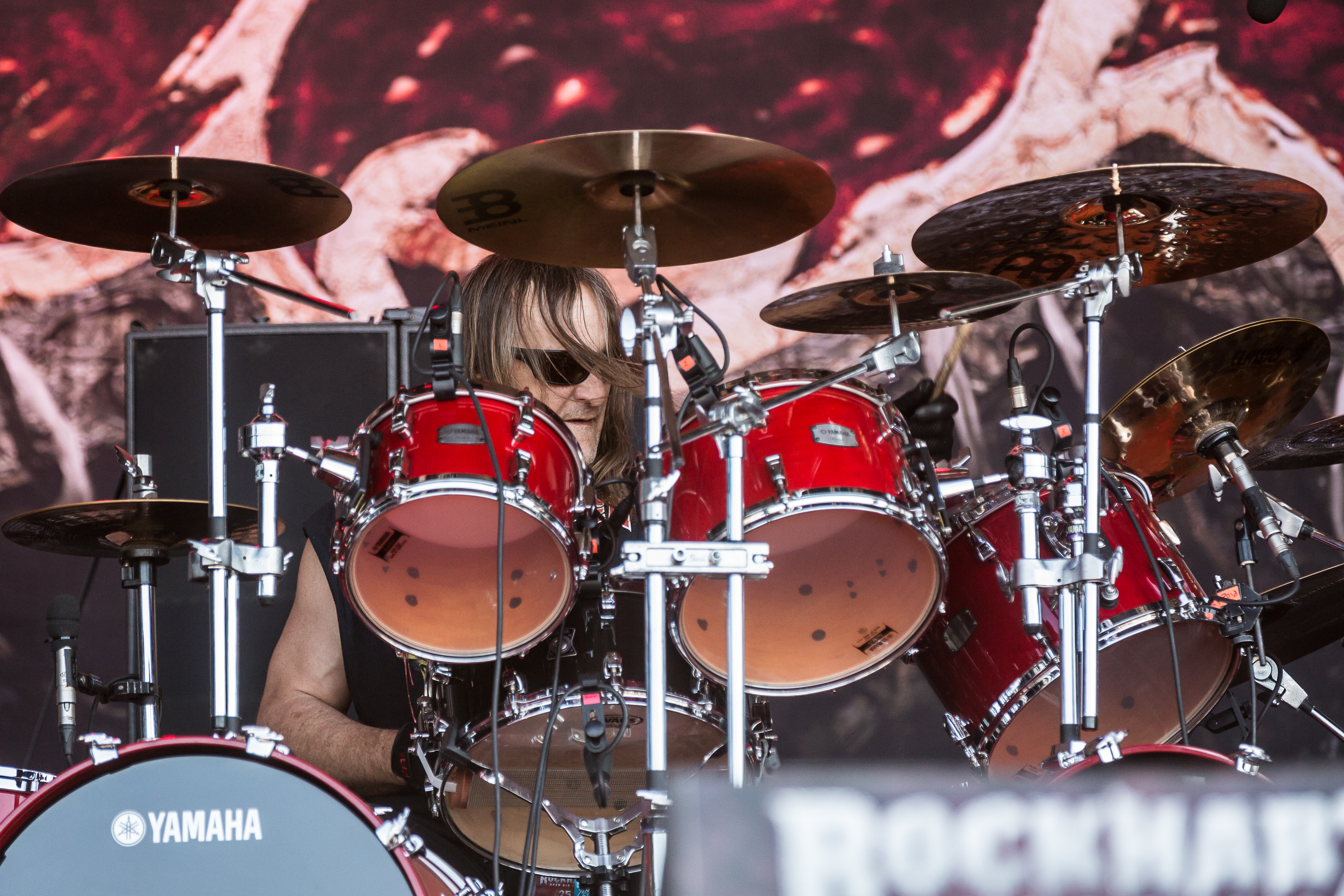
Drummer Tom Hunting is the only remaining original member of Exodus, with the exception of two sabbaticals from 1989 to the band's first reunion in 1997, and again from 2005 to 2007.

Exodus opened for Rob Zombie and Slayer in 2011 on the Hell on Earth tour. Gary Holt filled in for Slayer guitarist Jeff Hanneman during the tour after Hanneman contracted necrotizing fasciitis caused by a spider bite. Holt filled in for Hanneman again on Slayer's next tour in the summer of 2012. When Exodus also toured in the summer of 2012, guitarist Rick Hunolt (who left Exodus in 2005) filled in for Holt. Cannibal Corpse guitarist Pat O'Brien also filled in for Holt during this time. Upon Hanneman's death in 2013, Holt became his permanent replacement but assured fans that he would not leave Exodus.

On February 4, 2012, a Paul Baloff Memorial Reunion Concert was held at the Oakland Metro Opera House. Former and current Exodus members in attendance included Kirk Hammett, Rick Hunolt, Gary Holt, Jeff Andrews, Lee Altus, Rob Dukes, Tom Hunting, and Jack Gibson. It was the first time they had all played together since 1983. The band was confirmed for the Graspop Festival and for the Hellfest in June 2012. By the summer of 2012, Exodus had begun writing new material for their tenth studio album.

In March and April 2013, Exodus headlined the Metal Alliance tour with support from Municipal Waste, Holy Grail and High on Fire. During the tour the band played Among the Living in its entirety every show.

=== Reunion with Steve Souza (2014–2025) ===
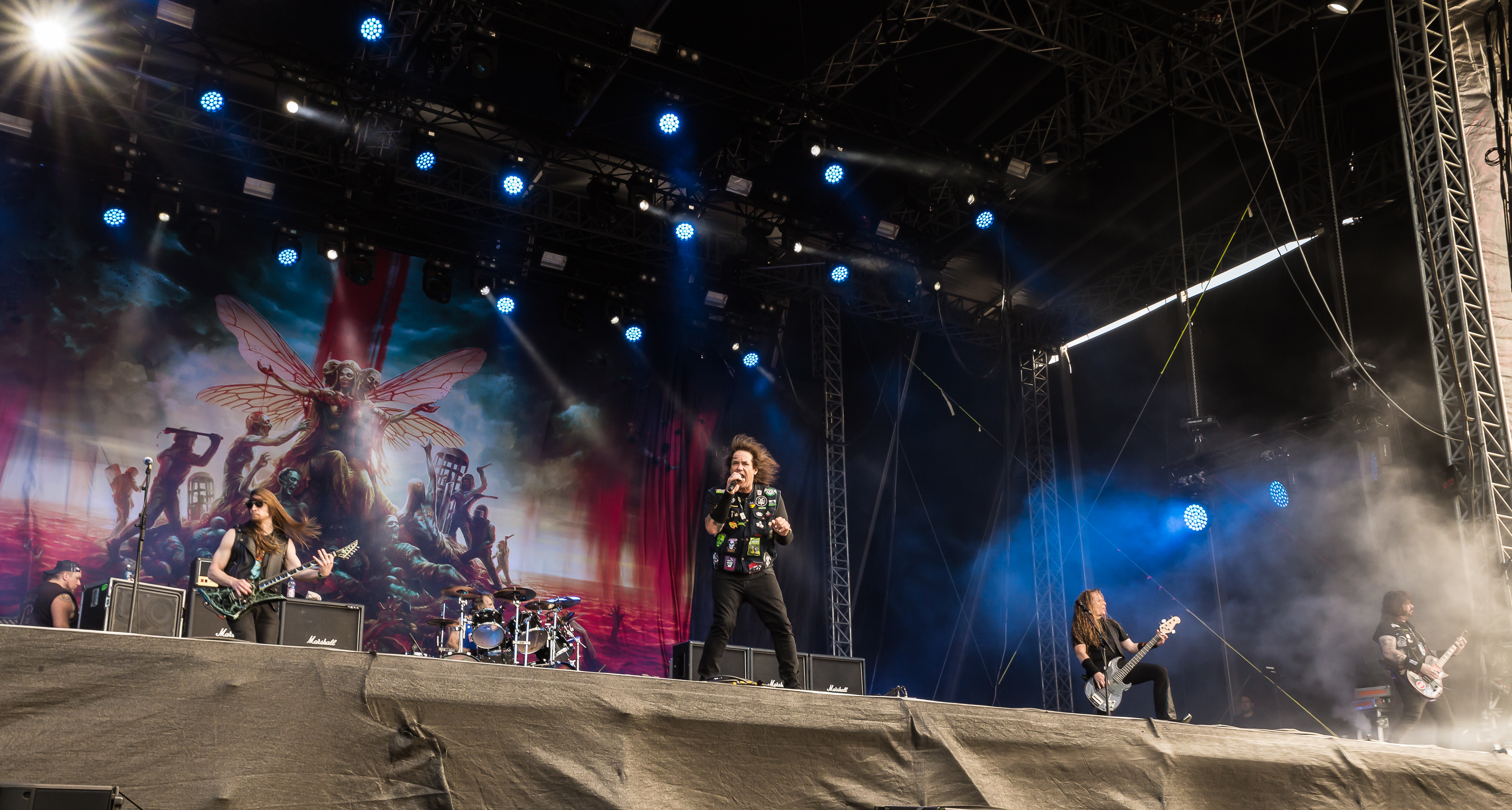
Exodus at Rockharz Open Air 2022

On June 8, 2014, Exodus announced that vocalist Rob Dukes had left the band, and was replaced by Steve "Zetro" Souza, making this the second time he had rejoined the band. Souza stepped in to record vocals for the new album, the first to feature him since 2004's Tempo of the Damned. The band's tenth studio album Blood In, Blood Out, was released on October 14, 2014. Original guitarist and founding member Kirk Hammett made a guest appearance on the song "Salt the Wound", marking his first recording with Exodus since the 1982 demo. The album received positive reviews from music critics upon its release, and peaked at No. 38 on the Billboard 200, making it the band's highest chart position to that point. Heathen guitarist Kragen Lum was brought in to replace Gary Holt for several live dates while Holt performed and recorded with Slayer. Exodus toured throughout 2015 in support of Blood In, Blood Out, performing at that year's edition of Australian Soundwave Festival, which was held across two weekends, and along with Shattered Sun, they supported Testament on their Dark Roots of Thrash II tour in the spring. Exodus then toured around Europe in June, including two nights at the Underworld in London. From October to December 2015, Exodus toured North American with King Diamond.

Writing for the band's follow-up to Blood In, Blood Out began as early as 2016, but actual recording of the album was uncertain due to Holt's involvement with Slayer. In 2017, drummer Tom Hunting said that the band had several songs written, with the remainder still being worked on. Souza explained that the material did not sound like a continuation of Blood In, Blood Out, but rather "a lot of records put together". Hunting said that the album could include another appearance by Kirk Hammett and a possible guest appearance by former guitarist Rick Hunolt. Progress was slow in the coming years, mostly interrupted by both Exodus' constant touring and Holt's commitment to Slayer's farewell tour. Recording of the band's eleventh studio album began in September 2020. Holt revealed on Instagram two months later that the title of album would be Persona Non Grata and it would be released in June 2021.

Former guitarist Rick Hunolt and vocalist Rob Dukes joined the band on stage at The Chapel in San Francisco for a one-off reunion show in July 2017. Exodus appeared at the 2018 edition of the Rockharz Open Air in Germany, as one of the early bands on the main stage. The band also headlined the 2018 installment of the MTV Headbangers Ball European Tour (along with Death Angel, Suicidal Angels and Sodom) from late November to mid-December 2018, and toured Europe with Testament and Death Angel in February and March 2020 by taking part in The Bay Strikes Back tour.

On April 13, 2021, three days after his 56th birthday, it was announced that drummer Tom Hunting had been diagnosed with squamous cell carcinoma of the stomach. As the result of his health issues, the band also announced that the release of Persona Non Grata would be delayed to November 2021. Exodus supported the album with a spring 2022 tour in North America with Testament and Death Angel, as part of the Bay Strikes Back tour, which was initially supposed to take place in the fall of 2021 but the COVID-19 pandemic meant postponing the tour to next year. While Hunting was recovering from his cancer surgery, the band recruited former Exodus drummer John Tempesta for the August 22 show in Las Vegas and the September 11 show in Cave-In-Rock. Hunting rejoined Exodus for their appearance at the Aftershock Festival in Sacramento on October 7, 2021. The band continued to tour behind Persona Non Grata in Europe and North America throughout the summer and fall of 2022, again with Testament and Death Angel, followed by another North American tour in January and February 2023 with Anthrax and Black Label Society. Due to "family concerns", guitarist Lee Altus did not participate in the European tour, and he was filled in by Brandon Ellis of The Black Dahlia Murder.

About two weeks after the release of Persona Non Grata, Holt spoke to The Aquarian Weekly about a potential follow-up album. When the interviewer reminded him to "be careful about losing [his] cell phone", in reference to a similar incident in which Metallica and original Exodus guitarist Kirk Hammett lost his cell phone containing riffs that he had recorded for Hardwired... to Self-Destruct, Holt responded: "I have my stuff backed up, but if I lose my phone, I wouldn't care. I've used the stuff I have really wanted to and by the time we do the next album, I'll probably record another thousand riffs that I don't listen back to." In a December 2021 interview with Guitar.com, Holt promised that there would not be another seven-year gap in between two studio albums. The Bay Strikes Back tour returned in October 2021, and went until October 2023.

On June 20, 2023, it was announced that Exodus had parted ways with Nuclear Blast after 20 years on the label, and they were signed to Napalm Records. A few days later, Holt confirmed via Instagram that he was "fully in writing mode now, assembling the pieces of the next album opener." Souza announced in October 2023 that the band would enter the studio around March or April 2024 to begin recording their new album, which was expected to be released by September of that year; he would later clarify that studio plans were pushed back to May 2024 due to slow progress and he had not yet heard anything that the members of Exodus were writing. Holt stated in an interview with Full Metal Jackie in August 2024 that the band would begin recording their new album in early 2025.

On April 10, 2024, Exodus announced that a new live album, titled British Disaster: The Battle of '89 (Live at the Astoria), would be released on May 31. It was recorded live at the London Astoria on March 8, 1989 during the band's Fabulous Disaster tour. On November 1, 2024, the band released their cover version of AC/DC's "Beating Around the Bush". After mostly playing European festivals during the summer of 2024, the band embarked on The Battle of '24 North American tour later that year with support from Havok, Candy and Dead Heat.

=== Souza's third departure and Dukes' return (2025–present) ===
Frontman Steve "Zetro" Souza and Exodus parted ways in January 2025, and the band replaced him with his predecessor Rob Dukes, stating: "We are beyond stoked to have Rob back ripping up the stage with us and he's looking forward to crushing everything like only he can." Exodus also announced its plans to record a new album with Dukes. Souza revealed that he was "let go" from the band, which was later confirmed by Exodus themselves. Holt compared Zetro's departure to a marriage that was over, and on his Toxic Vault webcast, Zetro agreed, saying "it was probably the right thing for me, and I hope it's the right thing for them as well."

Exodus played its first show with Dukes in eleven years at the Decibel Metal & Beer Fest in Philadelphia on April 5, 2025. They also played the UC Theatre in Berkeley on April 25, and at the House of Blues in Anaheim the next day. Both of those shows saw the band commemorate the 40th anniversary of the release of their debut album Bonded by Blood and also celebrated what would have been former singer Paul Baloff's 65th birthday. Shortly thereafter, they embarked on a headlining U.S. tour, titled "Swarm of Horror", with support from Havok and Misfire. A few days before those shows, Exodus released a cover version of Scorpions' "He's a Woman, She's a Man" that included lead vocals by Mark Osegueda of Death Angel, making it the band's first song in four decades not to feature any vocal contributions from either Souza or Dukes.

Holt announced in February 2025 that Exodus would release their new album in 2026. The album's recording sessions took place during the summer and fall of that year, and mixing was handled by Mark Lewis, making this the first time in more than three decades that the band had not worked with Andy Sneap. The resulting album, Goliath, was released on March 20, 2026; it was preceded by three singles: "3111", "Goliath" and "Promise You This". Exodus promoted the album with a number of major tours; they supported Megadeth on the Canadian leg of their final tour, Kreator on the European leg of their Krushers of the World tour, and Sepultura on their final North American tour.

The members of Exodus have stated that a follow-up to Goliath is in the works, with Holt revealing as early as March 2025 that, "We'll keep [the second new album] in the can, ready to go, and won't have any downtime. We're not getting any younger. We might as well work a little extra hard now while we can." That fall, he confirmed that they have 80 percent of the new material done, and in February 2026, he revealed that during the making of Goliath, "Our goal was to finish this in the follow-up album all at once, and we came, like, two songs shy for the next album. We have eight in the can."

== Musical style, legacy and influences ==
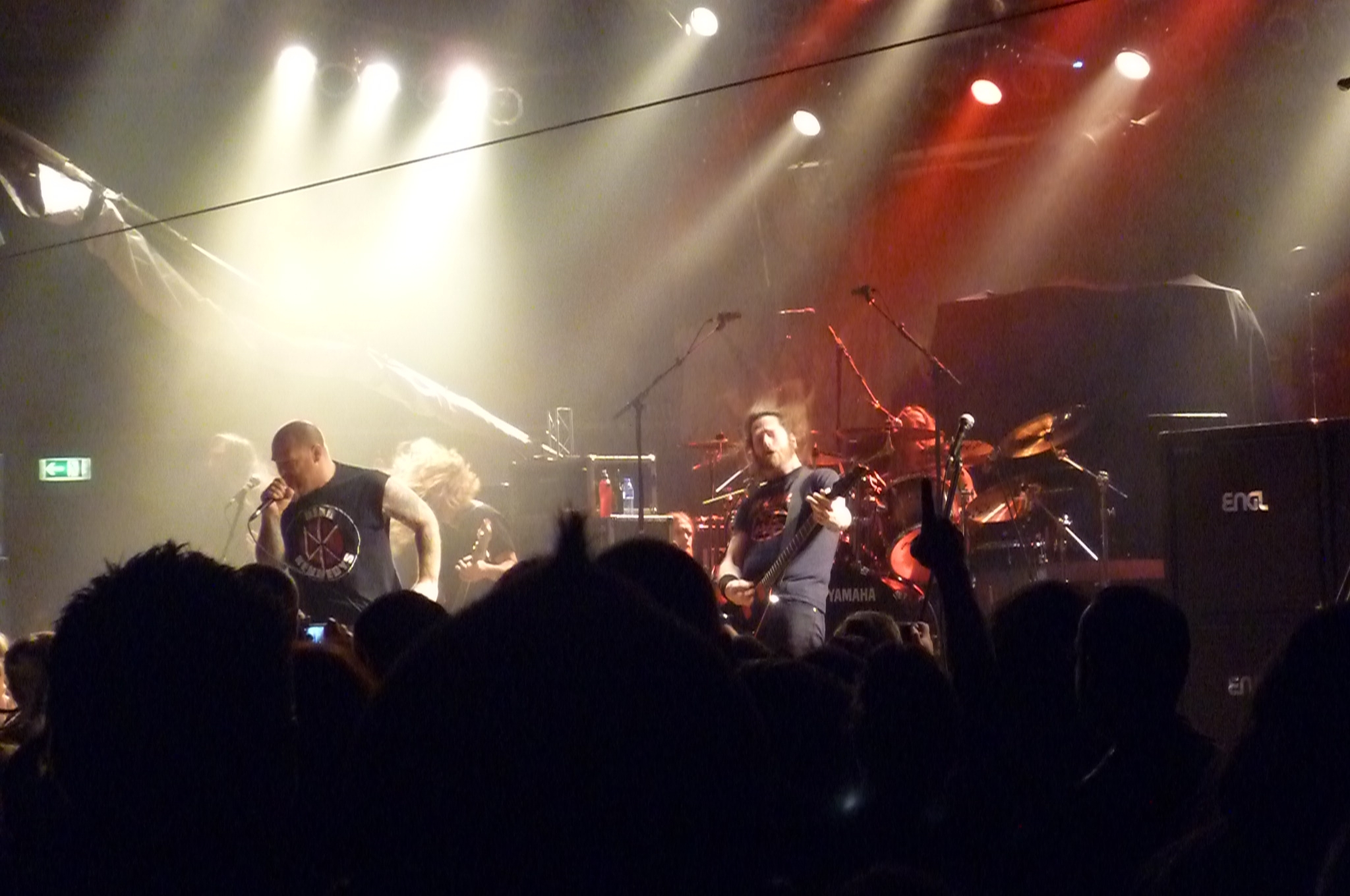
Exodus live at the Garage in Saarbrücken, 2010

Exodus has been credited as one of the pioneers of the thrash metal genre, which achieved mainstream popularity in the 1980s and early 1990s, and is often credited as the first Bay Area thrash metal band to exist, predating Metallica, who was originally from Los Angeles. Exodus is also considered to be a member of the "Big Eight" of the genre, along with Metallica, Megadeth, Slayer, Anthrax, Testament, Overkill, and Death Angel. Alternatively, Exodus has been called one of the "Other Big Four" or the "Second Big Four" of thrash metal, alongside Testament, Overkill, and Death Angel.

Since the band's debut album Bonded by Blood, guitarist Gary Holt has written a bulk of Exodus' music and lyrics, besides a few expectations of lyrics written by vocalists Rob Dukes and Steve Souza. Throughout the band's tenure their lyrical themes have touched upon violence, dark humor, social and political commentary, along with anti-religious sentiments. After replacing Paul Baloff with Souza as their lead singer in 1986, Exodus began to shift from the pure thrash metal vein of Bonded by Blood to more technical and progressive structures on their next three albums, Pleasures of the Flesh, Fabulous Disaster, and Impact Is Imminent. While they did not completely alter its thrash metal style on their fifth album Force of Habit, it saw the band experiment with elements of alternative and groove metal. Starting with their comeback album Tempo of the Damned, Exodus transformed their style once more, returning to its traditional thrash metal sound, and simultaneously blending characteristics of melodic, technical and progressive sensibilities.

The members of Exodus have cited numerous artists as an influence or inspiration to their sound, including AC/DC, Accept, Angel Witch, Black Sabbath, David Bowie, Roy Buchanan, Glen Campbell, the Clash, Ry Cooder, Deep Purple, Diamond Head, Discharge, the Doors, the Exploited, GBH, Jimi Hendrix, Iron Maiden, Elton John, Judas Priest, Led Zeppelin, Mercyful Fate, Gary Moore, Motörhead, Nazareth, Ted Nugent, Pink Floyd, Queen, Rainbow, Rush, Scorpions, the Sex Pistols, Sweet Savage, Thin Lizzy, Robin Trower, Tygers of Pan Tang, UFO, Van Halen, Stevie Ray Vaughan, and Venom. Holt recalled, "We were all listening to the early Mercyful Fate demos. I was like, 'Who's this fuckin' dude reciting the Lord's Prayer backwards? He's awesome.' [...] All that stuff had a huge influence on us in the beginning."

Many thrash metal bands, including Megadeth, Slayer, Anthrax, Testament, Death Angel, Vio-lence, Sepultura, Flotsam and Jetsam, Annihilator, Dark Angel, Forbidden, Sacred Reich, Heathen, Artillery, Power Trip, Havok, and Evile, as well as other bands such as Pantera, Obituary, Cannibal Corpse, Darkthrone, Fear Factory, Eyehategod, Primal Fear, Slipknot, and Hatebreed, have cited Exodus as an influence or inspiration to their music.

Loudwire placed Exodus at number five on its list of the "10 Best Thrash Bands of All Time", calling them "The original kings of the Bay Area thrash scene", and saying that "While their uncompromising sound and uneven output in the coming decades kept world domination and platinum success ever at bay, you'd be hard passed to finger any other band, short of Slayer, perhaps, that's flown the thrash flag as proudly and unwaveringly as Exodus." In 1989, Brad Tolinski of Guitar World magazine wrote that, "If Exodus is a speed metal equivalent of the Rolling Stones, then New York-based Anthrax must surely be the genre's The Beatles." In 2002, Jon Wiederhorn of MTV noted that Exodus "was instrumental in pioneering thrash metal — a style of music that blended the fury of hardcore and the razor-edged precision of such British bands as Iron Maiden and Judas Priest — and soon became the toast of the Bay Area metal scene, which also included Metallica, Testament, Flotsam & Jetsam and Death Angel." Guitar World wrote in 2004 that, "The band's first three albums were a destructive mix of sharp, buzzing rhythms and leads, a sound that came off like Iron Maiden crossed with Slayer." Ultimate Guitar also referred to Exodus as the "historical bridge between 'The Big Four' of thrash (Metallica, Megadeth, Slayer, and Anthrax) and the genre's second wave in the late 1980s", while Ken McIntyre of Metal Hammer described them as "arguably the most musically violent band in the Bay Area thrash movement." Their 1985 debut album Bonded by Blood remains influential in thrash metal genre making many publications list of the best thrash metal and metal albums of all time list.

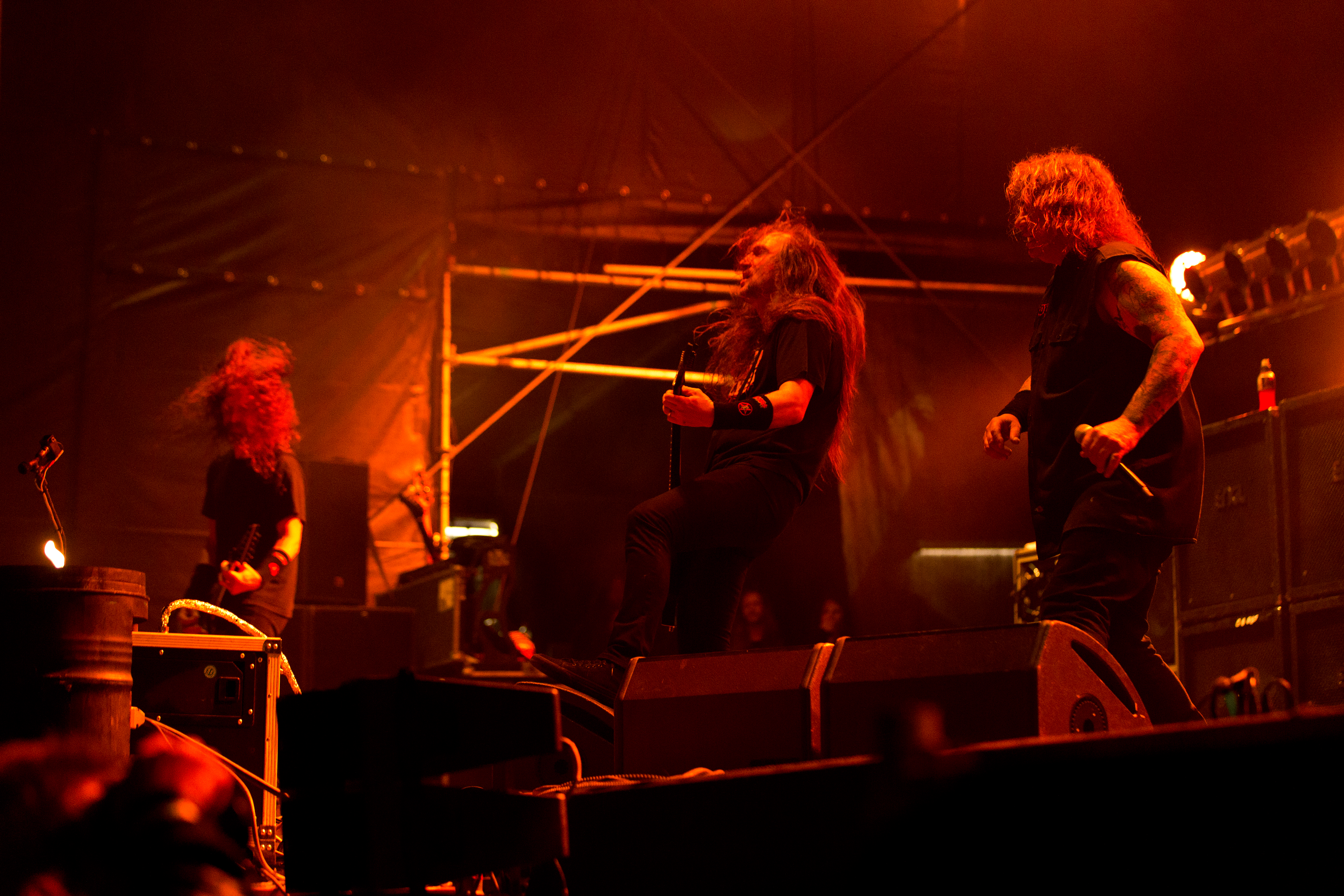
The band performing at Party.San Metal Open Air, 2016

=== The "Big Four" debate ===
Due to Exodus' involvement in the early 1980s thrash metal scene, it has been debated among journalists and musicians alike over whether or not Exodus warrants the status of inclusion in the "Big Five" of thrash metal, along with Metallica, Megadeth, Slayer and Anthrax. Mike McPadden of VH1 stated, "Much is made of Thrash's Big Four [...] True devotees know, however, that Big Five is the actual proper figure and that Exodus is the band that completes the quintet." Anthrax guitarist Scott Ian also stated that, "People talk about the 'Big Four' all the time, but back then it was really the 'Big Five' because Exodus were just as important and just as influential as everybody else." Megadeth frontman Dave Mustaine said in a 1990 interview that, in his point of view, Exodus were among the "Big Four" and Anthrax were not. He is quoted saying, "Exodus are a much better band [than Anthrax] – I really like Exodus. Gary Holt and Rick Hunolt are really great guitar players. I like Scott Ian, but anyone else in that band kind of bores me. Having a disco thing is not what I think having a metal band is all about, and that guy had the audacity to say that he and I should work together! I felt like saying what are you planning to do? Open a disco fashion shop?" Mustaine has also been quoted as saying, "You know, people will say there's a whole other generation, like the 'Medium Four' [laughs], and I think there's a lot of great bands that fit that bill, too. But I think probably Exodus, because there was nobody else at the time that had that kind of pull or that kind of importance in the metal community. Granted, it was with Baloff, and Baloff had a voice that you had to have an acquired taste for, but you know, I liked him."

In addition to Ian and Mustaine, Holt has agreed that Exodus should be included in the "Big Five" of thrash metal because they "were there at the start of thrash metal with Metallica in the real early '80s. Same thing with Megadeth because Mustaine was a part of Metallica's birth and he also created Megadeth." Former frontman Steve "Zetro" Souza has stated that the fact that Exodus was not included in the "Big Four" does not bother him: "I've heard that term many times and it doesn't really matter to me. It's not the truth. There's them, and Overkill, Testament and Exodus. You could also talk about Kreator, Sodom and Destruction, if you want to get down to it. It doesn't bother me — I'm content where I'm at."

In 2025, Zahra Huselid of Screen Rant included the band in the site's list of "10 Best Thrash Metal Bands Who Weren't The Big Four".

== Band members ==
Current

- Tom Hunting – drums (1979–1989, 1997–1998, 2001–2005, 2007–present), lead vocals (1979–1982)
- Gary Holt – guitars, backing vocals (1981–1993, 1997–1998, 2001–present)
- Jack Gibson – bass, backing vocals (1997–1998, 2001–present)
- Lee Altus – guitars (2005–present)
- Rob Dukes – lead vocals (2005–2014, 2025–present)

== Discography ==
- Bonded by Blood (1985)
- Pleasures of the Flesh (1987)
- Fabulous Disaster (1989)
- Impact Is Imminent (1990)
- Force of Habit (1992)
- Tempo of the Damned (2004)
- Shovel Headed Kill Machine (2005)
- The Atrocity Exhibition... Exhibit A (2007)
- Let There Be Blood (2008)
- Exhibit B: The Human Condition (2010)
- Blood In, Blood Out (2014)
- Persona Non Grata (2021)
- Goliath (2026)

== Awards and nominations ==
State of Arkansas
Year	Nominee / work	Award	Result
2025	Exodus	Arkansas Traveler Award	Won

Loudwire Music Awards
Year	Nominee / work	Award	Result
2014	Exodus	Metal Band of the Year	Nominated
2014	Blood In, Blood Out	Metal Album of the Year	Nominated
2014	"Salt the Wound"	Metal Song of the Year	Nominated

Metal Hammer Golden Gods Awards
Year	Nominee / work	Award	Result
2017	Exodus	Inspiration Award	Won

Metal Storm Awards
Year	Nominee / work	Award	Result
2004	Tempo of the Damned	Best Thrash Metal Album	Nominated
2005	Shovel Headed Kill Machine	Best Thrash Metal Album	Nominated
2007	The Atrocity Exhibition... Exhibit A	Best Thrash Metal Album	Won
2010	Exhibit B: The Human Condition	Best Thrash Metal Album	Nominated
2014	Blood In, Blood Out	Best Thrash Metal Album	Nominated
2021	Persona Non Grata	Best Thrash Metal Album	Won

The Metal Hall of Fame
Year	Nominee / work	Award	Result
2018	Exodus	The Metal Hall of Fame	Inducted
