= Exhibit B: The Human Condition =

Studio album by Exodus
- Released: May 7, 2010
- Recorded: December 2009
- Genre: Thrash metal
- Length: 74:24
- Label: Nuclear Blast
- Producer: Andy Sneap

Exodus chronology
Let There Be Blood (2008)	Exhibit B: The Human Condition (2010)	Blood In, Blood Out (2014)

Exhibit B: The Human Condition is the tenth studio album by American thrash metal band Exodus. The album picks up after The Atrocity Exhibition... Exhibit A, continuing with long, epic songs (averaging around 6 minutes) with darker themes centered on war, death, society, politics and religion. It was released on May 7, 2010, in Europe and was released on May 18, 2010, in the United States. It debuted at number 114 on the Billboard 200. Additionally, Exhibit B was Exodus' first studio album since 1989's Fabulous Disaster that did not feature a lineup change from the preceding album. It sold around 4,600 copies in its first week of release in the U.S. Exhibit B was Exodus' last album with vocalist Rob Dukes until 2026's Goliath. It is one of the band's longest albums in their discography at 1 hour and 14 minutes.

== Cover art ==
Guitarist Gary Holt commented on the bands intentions for the album's cover:

"We wanted to portray the violence of man at its finest, so we started with our own version of the Leonardo da Vinci sketch of Vitruvian Man, but done the 'EXODUS' way! I was pointed in the direction of Colin Larks of Rainsong Design for the cover and he killed it! To me, the artwork represents man and his affinity for bloodshed, ignorance, and all-around ability to be led like sheep to the slaughter. The image fits the songs on this record perfectly. The whole layout is going to be as sick as the record itself!"

== Music and lyrical themes ==
The album displays a variety of lyrical themes, but is almost entirely focused on dark and depressing topics. Government is a recurring theme with "Downfall" describing the fall of major world governments through war and recession, and "March of the Sycophants" describing the hypocrisy of Christian conservatives. Some songs focus on tragic events such as the Nanking Massacre in "Nanking" and the killings carried out by Leonard Lake and Charles Ng in "The Ballad of Leonard and Charles".

Although the album picks up where The Atrocity Exhibition... Exhibit A left off, it only does musically the albums do not share the same lyrical themes and it is not a concept. Guitarist Gary Holt stated "Exhibit "A" and "B" are tied together musically because "B" begins where "A" faded out and "B" ends where "A" came in."

== Reception ==
Professional ratings
Review scores
Source	Rating
About.com	4/5 stars
AllMusic	3.5/5 stars
AltSounds	(90%)
Guardian.co.uk	4/5 stars
PopMatters	7/10 stars
Metal.de	8/10
Ultimate Guitar	8.7/10

Exhibit B: The Human Condition received positive reviews. Greg Prato from Allmusic said: "You can always count on Exodus to supply some good, old-fashioned, downright vicious thrash metal with each release. And the lads deliver once more on their 2010 offering, Exhibit B: The Human Condition (impressively, their fourth album over a six-year period -- 2004-2010), further describing it by saying - with the intensity not dipping one iota from beginning to end, and - Even with the tunes that momentarily take a breather ('Democide,' 'A Perpetual State of Indifference,' etc.), it's only a matter of time until Exodus rams down the gas pedal once again and returns to their chug-a-lug riffery. Exodus has always liked it fast and furious, and they certainly don't disappoint with Exhibit B: The Human Condition."

Ultimate Guitar wrote "Exodus has managed to remedy the problems they encountered on the last album by diversifying the songs more. Each of the tracks has its strong points and moments that make it stand out. To all those people who complain about the length, I say good riddance (pun intended). In summary, Exodus is the embodiment of the reason that there is no school except the old school and Exhibit B is physical evidence of that fact." Metal.de added "Anyone who liked the recent records featuring Rob Dukes will also be thrilled by *Exhibit B: The Human Condition*. But take note: this one won't click on the very first listen; it takes a few spins for the full flavor to unfold."

== Track listing ==
All songs written by Gary Holt except where noted.

No.	Title	Writer(s)	Length
1.	"The Ballad of Leonard and Charles"	Lee Altus, Rob Dukes	7:14
2.	"Beyond the Pale"		7:40
3.	"Hammer and Life"		3:31
4.	"Class Dismissed (A Hate Primer)"		7:15
5.	"Downfall"		6:22
6.	"March of the Sycophants"		6:45
7.	"Nanking"		7:22
8.	"Burn, Hollywood, Burn"		4:05
9.	"Democide"	Altus, Dukes	6:36
10.	"The Sun Is My Destroyer"		9:33
11.	"A Perpetual State of Indifference/Good Riddance"		7:58
Total length:			74:18

Bonus track
No.	Title	Length
12.	"Devil's Teeth"	4:13
Total length:		78:31

== Personnel ==
Exodus

- Rob Dukes – vocals
- Gary Holt – guitars
- Lee Altus – guitars
- Jack Gibson – bass
- Tom Hunting – drums

Additional performers

- Brendon Small – guitar solo on "Devil's Teeth"
- Peter Tägtgren – backing vocals on "The Sun Is My Destroyer"
- Raymond Anthony – keyboards on "The Ballad of Leonard and Charles"

Production

- Andy Sneap – production, mixing, mastering
- Adam Myatt – assistant engineering
- Raymond Anthony – additional guitar engineering on "The Ballad of Leonard and Charles"
- Colin Marks – artwork, layout

== Charts ==
Chart (2010)	Peak position
Austrian Albums (Ö3 Austria)	49
Finnish Albums (Suomen virallinen lista)	50
German Albums (Offizielle Top 100)	32
Greek Albums (IFPI)	14
Swiss Albums (Schweizer Hitparade)	53
UK Rock & Metal Albums (OCC)	23
UK Independent Albums (OCC)	35
UK Independent Album Breakers (OCC)	12
US Billboard 200	114
US Independent Albums (Billboard)	19
US Top Album Sales (Billboard)	114
US Top Rock Albums (Billboard)	43
US Top Hard Rock Albums (Billboard)	12
